= American football in Texas =

American football is the most popular sport in Texas. The state of Texas has produced the most professional football players and most pro football players of all time.

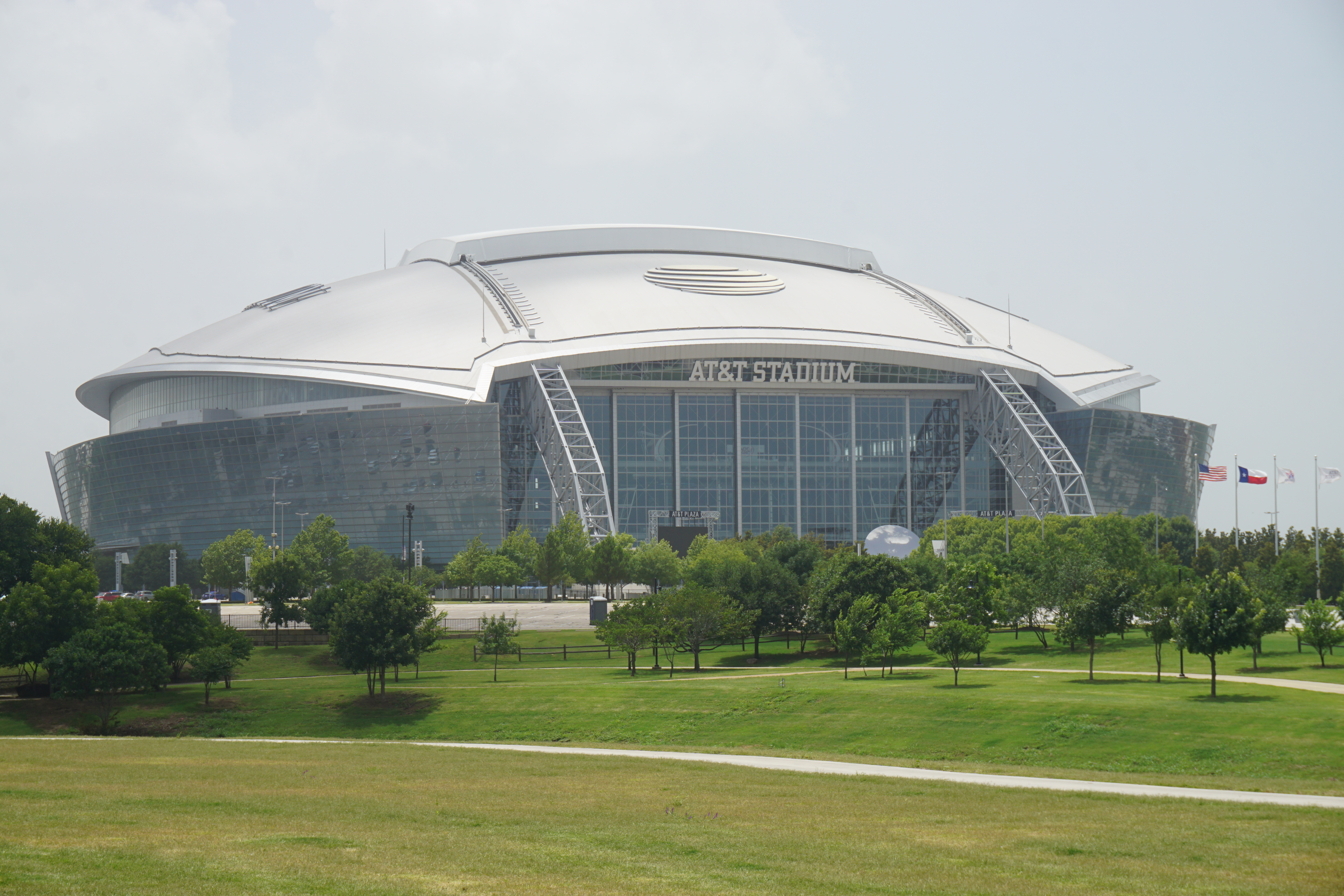
AT&T Stadium, the home of the Dallas Cowboys, the most popular pro football team in the state

== History ==
American football has a long history in Texas, but its modern popularity can be traced back to 1959, when Lamar Hunt, the son of Texas Oil magnate H.L. Hunt established the American Football League. Lamar Hunt had shown previous interest in owning a professional football team in Dallas having shown interest in buying the Chicago Cardinals and relocating them to his hometown of Dallas. After being rejected by the National Football League, Hunt (Who founded the Dallas Texans started the American Football League with 7 other owners, including Bud Adams (The founder of the Houston Oilers), another Texas Oilman. In response to this, the National Football League created the Dallas Cowboys, owned by Clint Murchison Jr., son of Clint Murchison Sr., also an Oil Tycoon. In the 1962 American Football League Championship Game, the Dallas Texans faced off against the Houston Oilers in which Dallas won 20-17. This would end up being the final game of the franchise in Dallas. The franchise was losing money despite putting up better records than the NFL's Dallas Cowboys. Owner Lamar Hunt, after considering Atlanta and Miami to relocate to. Kansas City, Missouri mayor H. Roe Bartle made an offer for team owner Lamar Hunt which he accepted and the franchise officially relocated to Kansas City on May 22, 1963 and the team was renamed the Kansas City Chiefs 4 Days later. The 1990s would prove a tough decade for Houston, losing the Houston Oilers to Nashville, Tennessee for the 1997 season, and became known as the Tennessee Titans for starting in the 1999 season. Team owner Bud Adams in a stadium funding dispute with the city had already threatened to move the Oilers to Jacksonville, Florida in 1987.

Texas might be known for their many professional football teams, but the sport has roots in Texas going back to1890 when the first games were played by colleges and private academies before spreading to public schools. People think of Texas when they hear the term "Friday Night Lights." It's a tradition and culture that has grown since the first documented high school football game played in 1892, Dallas High School.

== Professional teams ==
=== Current ===
- Dallas Cowboys: established in 1960
- Houston Texans: established in 1999. Started play in the 2002 NFL season

=== Former ===
- Dallas Texans (NFL); folded after 1952 season
- Dallas Texans (AFL): relocated to Kansas City after the 1962 season and are now the Kansas City Chiefs
- Houston Oilers: played first 37 seasons in Houston. Now the Tennessee Titans

== Notable people ==
=== Players ===
- Earl Campbell
- Joe Greene
- Jalen Hurts
- Vince Young
- Patrick Mahomes
- Von Miller
- Mike Evans (wide receiver)
- Earl Thomas
- Adrian Peterson
- Andy Dalton
- Ryan Tannehill
- Matthew Stafford
- Andrew Luck

=== Coaches ===
- Tom Landry
- Dan Campbell
- Jimmy Johnson (American football coach)

=== Owners ===
- Bud Adams, Houston Oilers/Tennessee Titans
- Clark Hunt, Kansas City Chiefs
- Lamar Hunt, Dallas Texans/Kansas City Chiefs
- Bob McNair, Houston Texans
- Janice McNair, Houston Texans, wife of Bob
- Cal McNair, Houston Texans
