= Clark Hunt =

American football executive (born 1965)

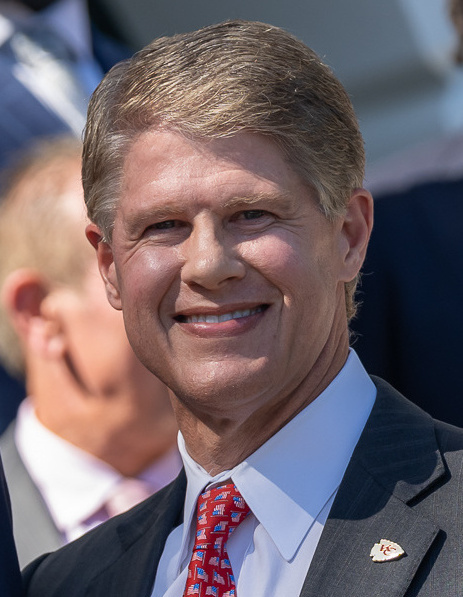
- Hunt in 2024

Kansas City Chiefs
- Title: Chairman/Co-owner

Personal information
- Born: February 19, 1965 (age 61); Dallas, Texas, U.S.

Career information
- College: SMU

Career history
- Kansas City Chiefs (2005–present) Chairman; Kansas City Chiefs (2006–present) Co-owner; Kansas City Chiefs (2010–2011) President

Awards and highlights
- 3× Super Bowl champion (LIV, LVII, LVIII)

Clark Knobel Hunt (born February 19, 1965) is an American billionaire, businessman and scion of the Hunt family. He currently serves as chairman and CEO of the National Football League (NFL)'s Kansas City Chiefs, Major League Soccer (MLS)‘s FC Dallas and a founding investor-owner in MLS. He is also chairman of Hunt Sports Group, where he oversees the operations of the Chiefs, FC Dallas and, formerly, the Columbus Crew of MLS. The group is estimated to have a total net worth of $24.8 billion as of 2024. He is the son of Chiefs founder Lamar Hunt and his second wife Norma Hunt, and is the grandson of oil tycoon H. L. Hunt. As of 2025, he had an estimated net worth of $1.6 billion.

Following the death of his father in 2006, Hunt, his mother, and his siblings inherited legal ownership of the Chiefs. However, as chairman and CEO, Clark is the public face of the "Unity Hunt" ownership group and operating head of the franchise, representing the Chiefs at all owners meetings. Prior to his mother's death in 2023, Hunt owned a 20.5 percent share of the franchise. Under Hunt's leadership, the Chiefs have made the playoffs twelve times, won the AFC West eleven times (nine consecutively), and appeared in five Super Bowls, winning three.

== Early life and education ==
Hunt was born on February 19, 1965. He is the son of Norma and Lamar Hunt and the grandson of oil tycoon H.L. Hunt. His father founded the Chiefs in 1960 as the Dallas Texans, a charter member of the American Football League, and moved them to Kansas City two years before Clark was born.

After graduating from St. Mark's School of Texas, he graduated from Southern Methodist University in 1987, where he was a captain of SMU's nationally ranked soccer team, a two-time Academic All-American, and a member of Phi Delta Theta. Hunt earned a degree in business administration with a concentration in finance.

Hunt worked for two years as an investment banker with Goldman Sachs. He then returned to Dallas and worked with his father.

== Professional sports teams ==
=== Major League Soccer and Wizards ===
One of the driving forces behind the creation of Major League Soccer, Hunt helped his father run the Kansas City Wizards until the team, now known as Sporting Kansas City, was sold in 2006.

Hunt remains a member of the league's board of governors and owns the MLS club, FC Dallas, and previously owned the Columbus Crew until 2013.

=== Start with Kansas City Chiefs (2005–2008) ===
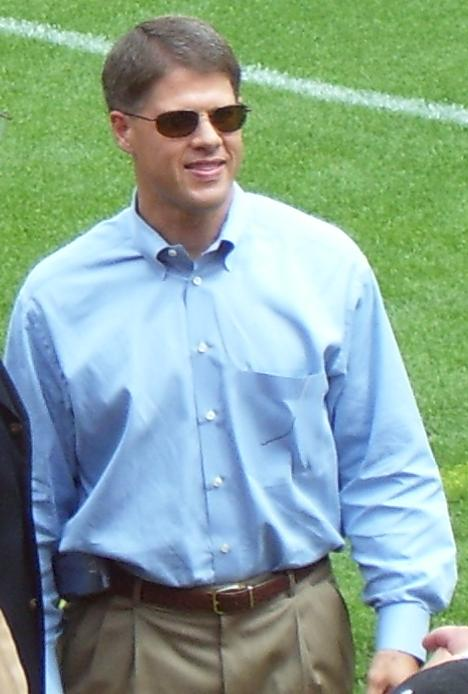
Hunt in 2007

Hunt was named chairman of the Kansas City Chiefs in 2005. Following the death of his father in 2006, he, his sister, and two brothers inherited ownership of the Chiefs. However, Hunt is the operating head of the franchise; he represents the Chiefs at owners' meetings and has the final say on personnel changes.

After the Chiefs' loss to the New York Jets in the 2007 season finale, Chiefs general manager Carl Peterson announced that both he and head coach Herm Edwards would return to the Chiefs in 2008. However, Hunt declined to immediately comment on Peterson's status. Hunt spoke out weeks later and stated that the Chiefs were his "No. 1 priority" and that "to have the best chance of success in 2008, having Carl here makes a lot of sense." Hunt wanted to avoid having a new general manager come in with a new head coach, and starting from scratch again.

On December 15, 2008, Hunt announced the resignation of Peterson from his positions as general manager, president, and CEO of the franchise effective the end of the season. Prior to the decision, the Chiefs had a combined record of 9–24 under Hunt's leadership since December 23, 2006.

The official press release stated that Peterson resigned, but Hunt had said the conversation had been ongoing throughout the season. Hunt said his decision to relieve Peterson of duties was not based on what happened the previous day, when the Chiefs lost an 11-point lead in the final 73 seconds and were beaten 22–21 by San Diego, dropping their record to 2–12 on the season. He also said that the fate of head coach Herm Edwards would be settled after the season when a new general manager would be hired. Hunt said he would split the duties previously held by Peterson and have someone in charge of the business side and someone else in charge of football for the franchise.

Hunt had kept his search for a new general manager almost entirely leakproof, instructing subordinates that only he was to speak on the situation.

=== Columbus Crew win (2008) ===
Under Hunt, Columbus Crew won their first MLS Cup championship on November 23, 2008.

In 2013, Hunt Sports Group sold the Columbus Crew to Precourt Sports Ventures, led by Anthony Precourt.

=== First Chiefs appointments (2009) ===
On January 13, 2009, Hunt hired New England Patriots vice president of player personnel Scott Pioli as the new Chiefs general manager. On January 23 the Chiefs fired head coach Herman Edwards, and Todd Haley was hired as his replacement on February 6.

=== Chiefs seasons (2009–2012) ===
Haley's first season did not go well, but he did a lot better in his second season. Hunt fired Haley on December 12, 2011, after the Chiefs had compiled a 5–8 record during the 2011 NFL season. Even though the team won the AFC West the year before Haley was replaced by defensive coordinator Romeo Crennel mid-season. Crennel finished his stint as interim head coach with a 2–1 record, including a win over the previously undefeated, and defending Super Bowl Champions (2011 Green Bay Packers season). On January 9, 2012, Hunt named Crennel the team's permanent head coach. The 2012 Chiefs finished with a 2–14 record, which was the worst in the league and for the first time in franchise history the Chiefs were set to have the first pick in the upcoming draft. Hunt fired both general manager Scott Pioli and head coach Romeo Crennel following the disastrous 2012 season.

=== Andy Reid and John Dorsey hirings (2013) ===
The Philadelphia Eagles decided not to renew head coach Andy Reid's contract after a 4–12 record, the worst of his 14-year tenure. He began exercising other head coaching opportunities and was highly coveted due to his success. During his 13 years in Philadelphia, Reid went 130–93–1 and made the playoffs 9 times (including one Super Bowl appearance). Even though there were 8 available head coaching jobs, Reid chose the Chiefs because he had a lot of respect for the Hunt family and the Chiefs organization. On January 4, 2013, Hunt hired Reid to a 5-year contract. Originally Hunt was going to give Reid full control over all football operations (a similar arrangement to what he had in Philadelphia), but on January 13, 2013, Hunt hired John Dorsey as general manager. Previous to this Dorsey had no general manager experience but was the Director of Football Operations for the Green Bay Packers and had also worked as a scout in Green Bay. Dorsey and Reid both worked for the Packers from 1992 to 1998 so they had been very familiar with each other. Hunt announced that Reid and Dorsey would have equal say in football operations.

=== Chiefs return to success (2013–2017) ===
The 2013 Chiefs bounced back and finished 11–5, making the playoffs but losing to the Indianapolis Colts in the first round of the playoffs. The Chiefs failed to make the playoffs the following year but did still finish the 2014 season with a winning record at 9–7. In 2015, Reid's third year the Chiefs improved on their 9–7 record and finished the 2015 season with a 11–5 record. 2015 saw the Chiefs win their first playoff game in Hunt's tenure and the first for the franchise since 1993, when they defeated the Houston Texans in the wild card round of the playoffs. The Chiefs however lost in the second round to the New England Patriots ending their season. The 2016 Chiefs finished with a 12–4 record, the best of Hunt's tenure as head of the franchise and won the AFC West for the second time in his tenure. The Chiefs lost at home to the Pittsburgh Steelers in the divisional round of the 2016–17 NFL playoffs. Hunt fired general manager John Dorsey on June 22, 2017, due to cap mismanagement. He then promoted co-director of Player Personnel Brett Veach. The Chiefs won the AFC West again in 2017 and finished with a 10–6 record. They lost to the Tennessee Titans in the first round of the 2017–18 NFL playoffs.

=== Path to Super Bowl (since 2018) ===
The 2018 Chiefs finished with a 12–4 record and clinched a first-round playoff bye for the 2018–19 NFL playoffs. The Chiefs won in the divisional round and made the AFC Championship for the first time since the 1993 season and were set to host it for the first time in franchise history. They lost in overtime to the New England Patriots. In 2019, the Chiefs finished with a 12–4 record and again hosted the AFC Championship game. This time, however, the Chiefs won their first AFC Championship and brought home the Lamar Hunt Trophy, which was named after his father. The Chiefs then went on to win Super Bowl LIV, the second in their history and their first in 50 years. In his Super Bowl LIV trophy acceptance speech, he paid homage to his father's trophy acceptance speech 50 years prior stating "It’s a beautiful trophy and I cannot think of a more perfect way to end the NFL's 100th season than receiving this trophy." The only change from his father's speech was Lamar said "...the AFL's 10th season..." The following season, the Chiefs finished 14–2, setting a franchise record for wins in a season. The Chiefs played in Super Bowl LV, their second consecutive trip to the Super Bowl, but lost to the Tampa Bay Buccaneers 9–31, which was the team's largest margin of defeat in four seasons. In 2022, the Chiefs finished 14–3 and reached their third Super Bowl in four years. The Chiefs won their second Super Bowl in four years against the Philadelphia Eagles 38–35. In 2023, the Chiefs finished 11–6 and reached their fourth Super Bowl in five years. The Chiefs won their third Super Bowl in five years against the San Francisco 49ers 25–22 becoming the first team to win back to back Super Bowls since the New England Patriots in 2003 and 2004.

=== NFL leadership ===
In addition to the on-field resurgence of the team, Hunt is a leading voice among NFL owners. In 2019, Hunt was named chairman of the influential NFL Finance Committee after being a member for seven years. Hunt is a member and former chairman of the NFL International Committee, and is also on the Management Council's executive committee (CEC) and the Personal Conduct Committee. Hunt was instrumental in securing the NFL's collective bargaining agreement in 2011, and he was one of six members of the NFL Committee on Los Angeles Opportunities.

== Personal life ==
Hunt is married to Tavia Shackles, a former Miss Missouri Teen USA and Miss Kansas USA. The couple have three children. His daughter, Gracie, was named Miss Kansas USA in 2021, 28 years after her mother won the pageant. Hunt is a Christian.

From 2016 to 2020, Hunt donated $53,675 to Republican candidates and causes.

Hunt has multiple notable relatives due to his grandfather H. L. having 15 children. These include: his father Lamar, brother Lamar Jr., aunts Margaret, Caroline Rose, June, Helen, and Swanee, uncles Nelson Bunker, William Herbert, and Ray Lee, and cousin Haela Hunt-Hendrix. His mother Norma, who died in 2023, was the only woman to have attended all of the first 57 Super Bowls and died months after attending Super Bowl LVII.

== See also ==
- List of NFL franchise owners
- List of Southern Methodist University people
- List of MLS franchise owners
- List of people from Texas
- Martha Firestone Ford
- Notable alumni of St. Mark's School of Texas
- Green Bay Packers Board of Directors

Sporting positions
Preceded by Lamar Hunt	Kansas City Chiefs principal owner 2006–present	Incumbent
