= Preston Road Trophy =

American football trophy

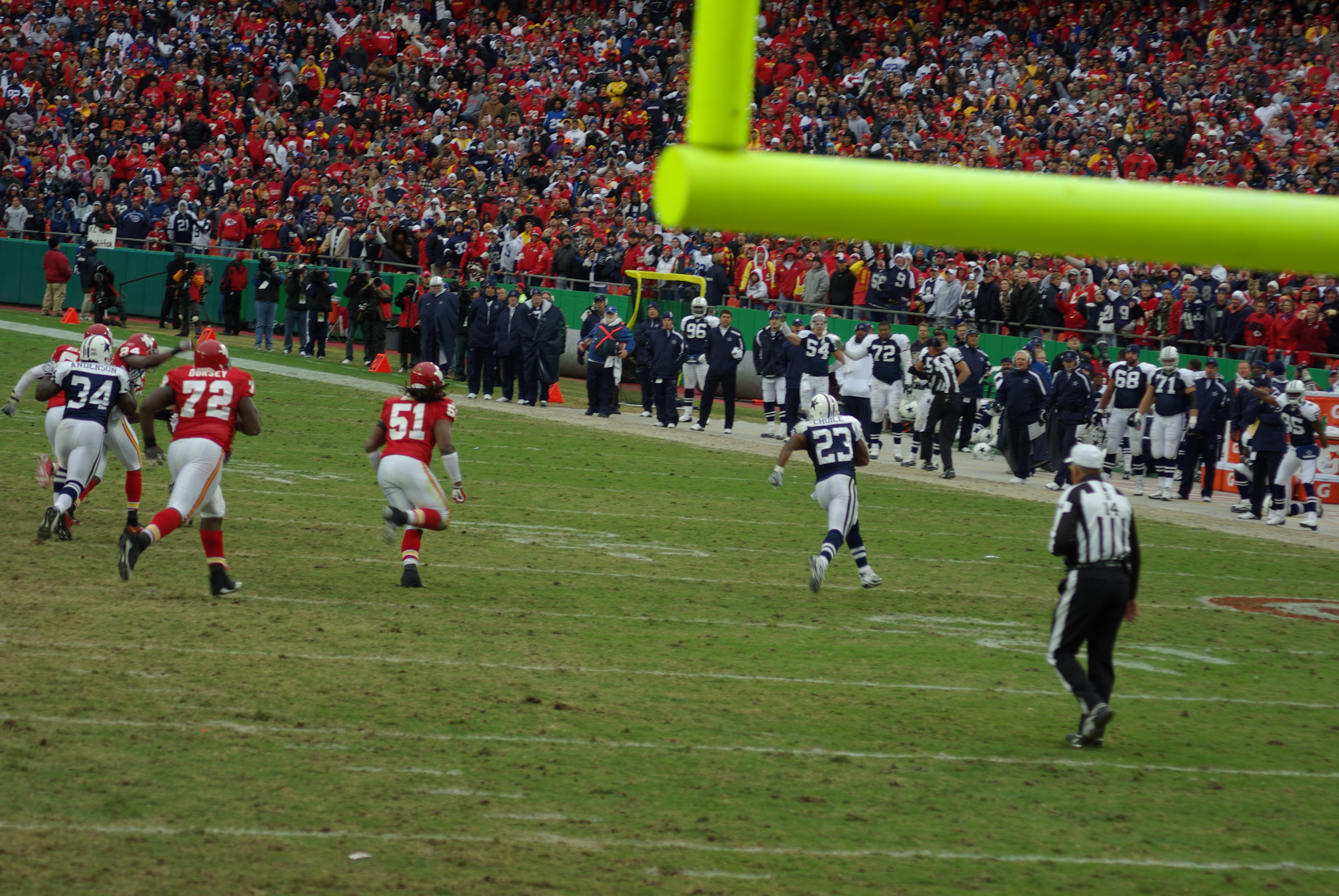
- Dallas' Tashard Choice (No. 23 in blue) rushing against the Kansas City defense (in red) in 2009

- Kansas City Chiefs Dallas Cowboys
- First meeting: Pre-trophy; October 25, 1970; Cowboys 27, Chiefs 16; Trophy; December 13, 1998; Chiefs 20, Cowboys 17
- Latest meeting: November 27, 2025; Cowboys 31, Chiefs 28
- Next meeting: TBD
- Trophy: Preston Road Trophy

Statistics
- Total meetings: 8 (Trophy); 13 (all time) (Note: Does not include preseason games.)
- All-time series: Cowboys: 5–3 (Trophy); Cowboys: 8–5 (all time)
- Largest victory: Chiefs: 19–9 (2021); Cowboys: 41–21 (1983)
- Longest win streak: Cowboys: 3 (2004–2009)
- Current win streak: Cowboys: 1 (2025–present)

The Preston Road Trophy, also called the Preston Road Traveling Trophy, is a trophy awarded to the winner of the American football game between the National Football League (NFL)'s Dallas Cowboys and Kansas City Chiefs. Introduced in 1998, it is awarded at all Chiefs–Cowboys meetings including preseason and regular season games.

The trophy was created by Chiefs owner Lamar Hunt to gamify his friendship with Cowboys owner Jerry Jones. The name is a reference to Preston Road, a street along Texas State Highway 289 where Hunt and Jones were neighbors. It continued to be awarded following Hunt's death in 2006.

Although they are not in the same division and don't meet the typical definitions of a rival, Hunt had a long-standing grudge against the Cowboys franchise stemming from the Chiefs' inception as the Dallas Texans in the early 1960s. CBS11 Sports wrote before their 2017 meeting that "it may not be Cowboys–Redskins, or Cowboys–Eagles, or Cowboys–Giants, but [the] Cowboys game against the Kansas City Chiefs is an old school rivalry."

Including preseason games, the Cowboys have won the trophy five times to the Chiefs' three. They also played each other six times before the trophy's creation, with Dallas winning all but two.

== Hunt's relationship with the Cowboys ==
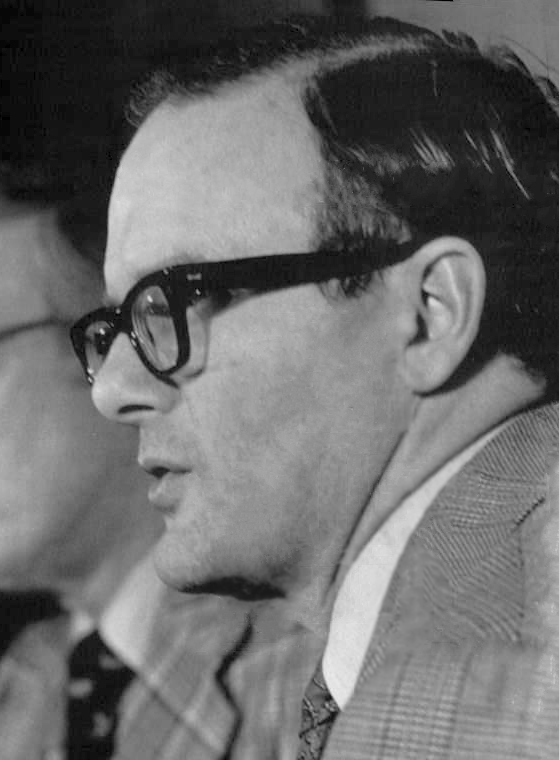
Lamar Hunt, founder and owner of the Chiefs

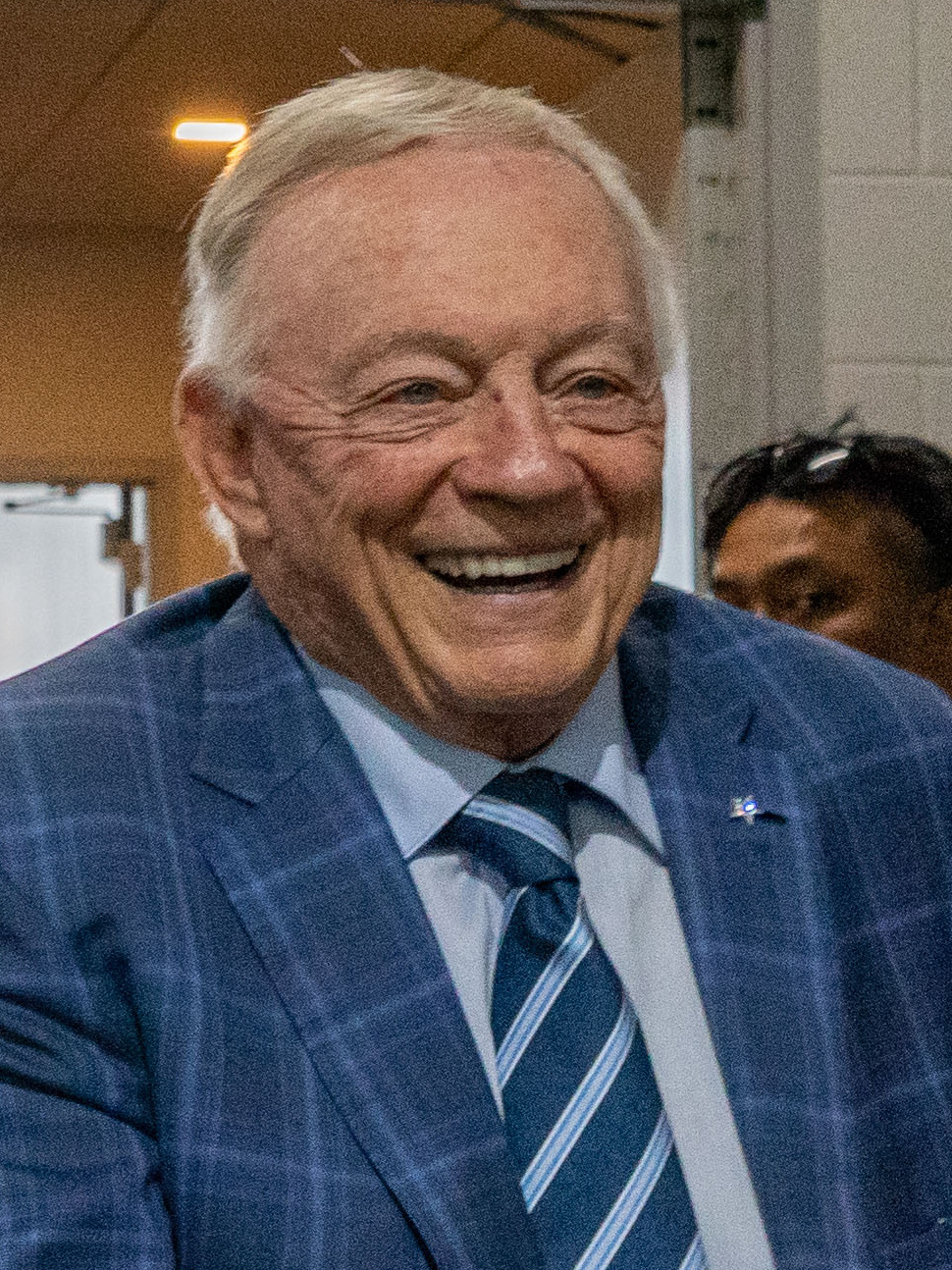
Jerry Jones, owner of the Cowboys

Despite not playing each other until 1970, the Chiefs and Cowboys had bitter relations as teams in rival leagues during the 1960s. After his request to start a National Football League team was rejected, Hunt cofounded the American Football League in 1959 and ran his own team called the Dallas Texans. The NFL attempted to reduce Hunt's influence in the city by awarding a franchise to Clint Murchison Jr. that became the Cowboys.

Hunt described the relationship between the teams as a "holy war". He also expressed interest in a game between the Texans and Cowboys at the Cotton Bowl, which became known as the "Game That Never Was" since it did not take place. His son Clark speculated the Cowboys would have refused to play "for fear of being embarrassed by the upstart AFL."

Although the Texans were more successful on the field, including winning the 1962 AFL Championship Game, they struggled to compete with the Cowboys in attendance and popularity. After losing approximately $1.25 million during their three-year stay in Dallas, Hunt moved the team to Kansas City, Missouri, and became the Chiefs in 1963. Hunt sold the Texans' practice facility to the Cowboys to help cover the relocation cost.

Over the decade, the Chiefs and Cowboys frequently clashed over the rights to sign college players. In a notable incident in 1965, both teams were interested in receiver and future Chiefs great Otis Taylor. The Cowboys brought Taylor and college teammate Seth Cartwright to a hotel in Richardson, Texas, for Thanksgiving before the Chiefs could meet with him, where they were forbidden from outside contact. After pinpointing their location, Chiefs staffers were unable to bypass the Cowboys' security and waited until the guards fell asleep before helping the players escape. Hunt called the plot "marvelous", while Howard Cosell quipped it was "bigger than a Brink's job" and "made Jessie James [sic] come off like a rank amateur".

Hunt continued to live in Dallas after relocating, and remained on the board for the Cotton Bowl. He also maintained a "casual interest" in the Cowboys as the local NFL team.

Former Chiefs general manager Carl Peterson recalled Hunt "never, ever forgot that rivalry" with the Cowboys and "there was still a piece of him disappointed that he had to pull the Dallas Texans out of there to become the Kansas City Chiefs." Jones compared Hunt to a "wolf in sheep's clothing" who was obsessed with defeating the Cowboys despite acting otherwise. Ex-Chiefs head coach Dick Vermeil equated Hunt's focus on Dallas to that of wanting to beat the Denver Broncos and Oakland Raiders, who were actual rivals of the Chiefs. Clark, who took over the Chiefs after his father's death, also suggested the Cowboys to be a worthy "NFC rival".

Jones purchased the Cowboys in 1989. His family and the Hunts have been close friends for decades, with Lamar first meeting Jones when he was 25 years old. Clark described their relationship as those of "friends" and "business partners".

== Trophy ==
"Obviously, we are all trying to get the Lombardi Trophy. In the meantime, we love competing for the Preston Road Trophy."

— Clark Hunt in 2017

During Hunt's life, he and Jones lived 300 yards apart and "almost across the street" in an upscale Dallas neighborhood on Preston Road.

In 1998, hoping to add a competitive flair to their friendship, Hunt commissioned a trophy to be awarded between their teams. According to Clark, his father was charged $50 by the trophy maker but insisted on paying $100 because "no respectful trophy costs under $100". Hunt called it "kind of an 'el cheapo' trophy. We kid each other about how coveted that trophy is. Obviously, it is. We always want to win every game." Coaches and players are typically unaware of its existence.

The Preston Road Trophy consists of a wood plank with a Preston Road street name sign, images of the Cowboys and Chiefs' helmets, and two plaques. The top plaque has the team logos and the phrase "Created in friendship on Dec. 13, 1998 on the occasion of the game between the Kansas City Chiefs-Dallas Cowboys", with a lower note stating it is "to be held in the possession of the winner until the next game between the two teams". The results of each meeting are inscribed on the lower plaque. Jones compared the design to a birdhouse, while Clark joked in 2013 that "it's the smallest and ugliest trophy in sports."

While in Chiefs' possession, Hunt displayed the trophy on his bedroom window so Jones had to see it while driving past. When exchanging the trophy, the owners often performed stunts on each other. After the Cowboys won it back in the 2004 preseason, Hunt presented the trophy to Jones at a Southern Methodist University board of trustees meeting. On one occasion, Hunt asked to borrow it for a dinner, to which Jones said it must be done through an "elaborate legal agreement" with his wife Norma Hunt. Likewise, Hunt mandated Jones had to return the piece by midnight when borrowing it. Clark Hunt keeps the trophy in his office when the Chiefs hold it. After regaining control in 2025, Jones remarked he would put the trophy by his bed with his wife Gene's blessing.

== Games ==
=== Before the trophy ===
Following the AFL–NFL merger, the Chiefs and Cowboys met for the first time in a preseason exhibition on September 6, 1970. Nicknamed the "city championship game", it was played in front of a nationally televised audience and a near-capacity crowd of 69,055 at the Cotton Bowl. The defending Super Bowl champion Chiefs won 13–0, which Hunt proclaimed was a "great victory". He also received the game ball.

The teams played again in the 1970 regular season, this time in Kansas City, with the Cowboys winning 27–16. Five years later, Kansas City upset Dallas 34–31 thanks to three touchdowns by Ed Podolak; the game saw a combined 12 fumbles, with the Cowboys forcing a team-record seven but losing all five of their own. In 1983, the Cowboys won 41–21 in their highest scoring performance since 1980.

They played later in 1989, the same year that Jones purchased the Cowboys. The Chiefs won 36–28 with four rushing touchdowns, their most in a game since 1976. The Cowboys beat the Chiefs in 1992 and 1995 during their Super Bowl XXVII- and XXX-winning campaigns, the latter being played on Thanksgiving.

Hunt received a plaque from Jones at halftime of the 1992 game to recognize his role in encouraging the NFL to bring a team to Dallas.

=== Trophy era ===
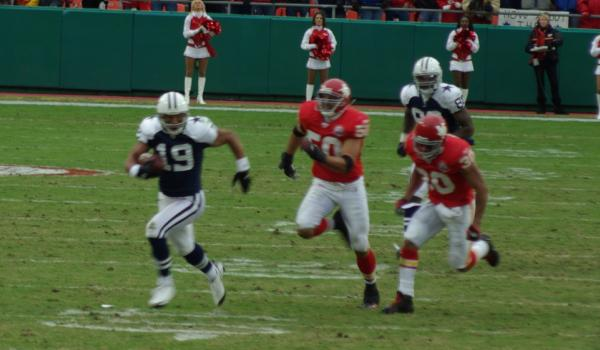
Miles Austin of the Cowboys outrunning the Chiefs in 2009

1998 was their first meeting following the Preston Road Trophy's creation. The Chiefs entered the game on a six-game losing streak that removed them from playoff contention, while the Cowboys had lost their last two but remained in contention to win the NFC East. Kansas City pulled ahead 17–3 after three quarters. Although the Cowboys scored two touchdowns in the fourth quarter, they opted to kick deep on the ensuing kickoff rather than attempt an onside kick with 2:48 remaining. Kansas City ran out the clock and prevented the Cowboys from getting the ball back to secure a 20–17 victory for the Chiefs.

In 2004, the two teams played each other as their final preseason game. The Chiefs struggled with penalties, though quarterbacks Trent Green and Todd Collins each threw a touchdown in the second quarter. The Cowboys scored twice in the third quarter to pull back ahead. Although two Lawrence Tynes fourth-quarter field goals narrowed the margin to four points, Kansas City's third-string offense faltered as the Cowboys held on to win 24–20.

A year later, the Chiefs and Cowboys met while pursuing spots in the NFL playoffs; the Chiefs were on a three-game winning streak that placed them at 8–4, while the Cowboys had lost their last two games and were 7–5. Although Dallas coach Bill Parcells was known for his conservative strategies, his team relied heavily on trick plays throughout the game. The first score of the game came on a flea flicker from Drew Bledsoe to receiver Terry Glenn, and the latter also scored his first career rushing touchdown. Kansas City took the lead on Green's 47-yard touchdown to Eddie Kennison with less than four minutes remaining. Dallas' final drive initially ended with a turnover on downs before the Chiefs were penalized for defensive holding. With 22 seconds to go, Dan Campbell caught the go-ahead touchdown, his first since 2003. Down by three points, Tynes missed the 41-yard field goal that would have tied the game.

Both teams wore throwback uniforms for their 2009 game: the Cowboys' were nods to their inaugural season, while the Chiefs had Dallas Texans throwbacks to commemorate the 50-year anniversary of the AFL. Over 50 Chiefs alumni and NFL commissioner Roger Goodell attended the game to honor Hunt. Ex-Chiefs general manager Jack Steadman commented that "Lamar would have gone apes over this." The Cowboys were marred by penalties and mistakes, which included a muffed punt and missed field goal, but took the lead late thanks to backup receiver Miles Austin's 59-yard touchdown. The Chiefs tied the game and forced overtime on Matt Cassel's throw to Dwayne Bowe with 24 seconds left, but Austin scored the game winner on a 60-yard score. Austin, who was making his first career start, recorded a Cowboys record 250 receiving yards.

New Chiefs quarterback Alex Smith played "nearly mistake-free" in the 2013 game, throwing for 223 yards and two touchdowns with no turnovers against a Cowboys defense that had six the week prior. Smith also led the team in rushing yards with 57. His opposite Tony Romo recorded 298 passing yards, 141 of which were to Dez Bryant along with a touchdown. However, the Cowboys offense lost fumbles on back-to-back drives and Romo had multiple inaccurate passes in the waning minutes, including an interception that was nullified by a penalty. Conversely, Dallas' defense blocked a field goal and had a fourth-quarter sack that prevented the Chiefs from attempting another kick. After the Cowboys kicked a field goal to reduce the deficit to 16–17 with less than four minutes remaining, the Chiefs offense burned over three minutes off the clock and punter Dustin Colquitt pinned Dallas on their own four-yard line. With 16 seconds left, Romo could only complete a ten-yard pass to DeMarco Murray before time expired.

The 2017 Chiefs–Cowboys game was Romo's first time covering his former team as an announcer for CBS. Although Dallas took a 14–3 lead, Chiefs receiver Tyreek Hill had a 57-yard score on the final play of the first half in which he evaded multiple defenders. The Chiefs took the lead on the first series of the second half, but the Cowboys had 75- and 87-yard scoring drives to pull away. Smith threw his first interception of the season to seal the defeat.

Kansas City reclaimed the trophy in 2021 courtesy of a dominant performance by their defense. The Chiefs sacked Prescott five times, his most since 2018, and limited him to a passer rating of 57.9 with two interceptions and a fumble. Likewise, the Cowboys' defense prevented Patrick Mahomes from throwing a touchdown while forcing a fumble and interception. Still, the Chiefs offense had two touchdown runs from Travis Kelce and Clyde Edwards-Helaire in the 19–9 win.

In 2025, the Cowboys hosted the Chiefs on Thanksgiving. The Chiefs, who made the Super Bowl the last three years, led 14–7 early before surrendering ten unanswered points before halftime. A third-quarter touchdown gave Kansas City the lead again, only for Dallas to pull ahead with a touchdown, two-point conversion, and field goal. Mahomes answered with a touchdown wth 3:27 left, but Prescott and the Cowboys offense ran out the clock on their ensuing possession to win 31–28. The CBS broadcast drew 57.23 million viewers, making it the most watched regular season fixture in NFL history.

== Results ==
=== Pre-trophy ===
Season	Date	Location	Result	Notes
1970	October 25	Municipal Stadium	Cowboys; 27–16	
1975	November 10	Texas Stadium	Chiefs; 34–31	Monday Night Football
1983	November 20	Texas Stadium	Cowboys; 41–21	
1989	October 22	Arrowhead Stadium	Chiefs; 36–28	
1992	October 18	Texas Stadium	Cowboys; 17–10	
1995	November 23	Texas Stadium	Cowboys; 24–12	Thanksgiving Day

=== Preston Road Trophy ===
Season	Date	Location	Result	Series	Notes
1998	December 13	Arrowhead Stadium	Chiefs; 20–17	Chiefs, 1–0	
2004	September 2	Texas Stadium	Cowboys; 24–20	Tied, 1–1	Preseason
2005	December 11	Texas Stadium	Cowboys; 31–28	Cowboys, 2–1	
2009	October 11	Arrowhead Stadium	Cowboys; 26–20	Cowboys, 3–1	Finished in overtime
2013	September 15	Arrowhead Stadium	Chiefs; 17–16	Cowboys, 3–2	
2017	November 5	AT&T Stadium	Cowboys; 28–17	Cowboys, 4–2	
2021	November 21	Arrowhead Stadium	Chiefs; 19–9	Cowboys, 4–3	
2025	November 27	AT&T Stadium	Cowboys; 31–28	Cowboys, 5–3	Thanksgiving Day
