= List of current NFL franchise owners =

The National Football League (NFL) requires a franchise's controlling owner to hold a minimum 30% stake. It forbids groups of over 24 people as well as corporations, religious groups, governments, and non-profit organizations from owning stakes in teams. One team, the Green Bay Packers, is exempt from this under a grandfather clause and is owned by public shareholders. The Houston Texans are also grandfathered in for their home county the Harris County, Texas, government which owns 5% of the team, as the rule forbidding governments from owning a team became effective in 2007. The NFL's constitution also forbids its owners from owning any other professional football teams, although an exception was made for teams from the now-defunct Arena Football League located in the NFL team's home market. In addition, the controlling owners of NFL teams were previously only permitted to own major league baseball, basketball and hockey teams if they were in the NFL team's home market, or were not located in other NFL cities. Institutional investors were historically forbidden from purchasing stakes in NFL teams until an August 2024 rule change; that December, it approved the sale of portions of the Dolphins and Buffalo Bills to private equity firms.

Soccer has been exempt from these restrictions since 1982, when the league lost a lawsuit filed by the original NASL stemming from the investments of Kansas City Chiefs owner Lamar Hunt and Elizabeth Robbie, the wife of Miami Dolphins founder Joe Robbie in NASL teams; as a result, NFL owners have owned teams in MLS in other NFL markets. In October 2018, the NFL owners voted to relax the cross-ownership rule, allowing controlling NFL owners to own other professional teams within NFL markets outside their home market. The league also informally requires prospective owners to have high liquidity in their assets and positive cash flow; having a majority of one's wealth invested in real estate is often grounds for rejection.

== Current owners ==
List of current NFL franchise owners
| Franchise | Principal owner | Since | Notes | Ref. |
|---|---|---|---|---|
| Arizona Cardinals | Michael Bidwill | 2019 | Grandson of Charles Bidwill, who acquired the team in 1933 | |
| Atlanta Falcons | Arthur Blank | 2002 | Majority owner | |
| Baltimore Ravens | Steve Bisciotti | 2004 | Majority owner | |
| Buffalo Bills | Terry Pegula | 2014 | Principal owner. Minority stakes held by his daughter Laura Pegula, Arctos Partners LP, Theresia Gouw, Jozy Altidore, Tracy McGrady, Vince Carter, and others, along with the estate of Pegula's incapacitated wife Kim Pegula, whose share is controlled by Terry Pegula and Bob Long in trust. | |
| Carolina Panthers | David Tepper | 2018 | | |
| Chicago Bears | George McCaskey | 2025 | Grandson of George Halas, whose family has owned the team since its founding in 1920. McCaskey took over as principal owner following the death of his mother Virginia Halas McCaskey in 2025. | |
| Cincinnati Bengals | Mike Brown | 1991 | Son of Paul Brown, who founded the team in 1968 | |
| Cleveland Browns | Jimmy Haslam | 2012 | Principal owner; his wife Dee Haslam owns roughly the same share | |
| Dallas Cowboys | Jerry Jones | 1989 | | |
| Denver Broncos | Rob Walton | 2022 | Head of an ownership group that includes Greg Penner, Carrie Walton Penner, Mellody Hobson, Condoleezza Rice, and Lewis Hamilton. | |
| Detroit Lions | Sheila Ford Hamp | 2020 | Daughter of William Clay Ford Sr., who acquired the team in 1964 | |
| Green Bay Packers | Green Bay Packers, Inc. | 1923 | Public corporation with a grandfathered exception to modern NFL ownership rules. The team is governed by a board of directors with president and CEO Ed Policy representing the team. | |
| Houston Texans | Cal McNair | 2024 | Son of founding owner Bob McNair | |
| Indianapolis Colts | Carlie Irsay-Gordon | 2025 | Principal owner and CEO; granddaughter of Robert Irsay, who acquired the team in 1972. Vice chair under her father Jim Irsay until his death in 2025. Gordon's sisters, Casey Foyt and Kalen Jackson, hold equal ownership shares in addition to respectively serving as the team's executive vice president and chief brand officer. | |
| Jacksonville Jaguars | Shahid Khan | 2012 | | |
| Kansas City Chiefs | Clark Hunt | 2006 | Principal owner; son of team founder Lamar Hunt. His siblings are also legal owners of the Chiefs. | |
| Las Vegas Raiders | Mark Davis | 2011 | Son of Al Davis of A. D. Football, Inc., which acquired the Raiders in 1972. Principal owner; his mother Carol Davis owned roughly the same share prior to her death. Tom Brady became a limited partner in 2025. | |
| Los Angeles Chargers | Dean Spanos | 1994 | Son of Alex Spanos, who acquired the team in 1984 | |
| Los Angeles Rams | Stan Kroenke | 2010 | | |
| Miami Dolphins | Stephen Ross | 2008 | Principal owner. Minority stakes held by Emilio and Gloria Estefan, Marc Anthony, Venus and Serena Williams, and Stacy "Fergie" Ferguson. | |
| Minnesota Vikings | Zygi Wilf | 2005 | Principal owner | |
| New England Patriots | Robert Kraft | 1994 | | |
| New Orleans Saints | Gayle Benson | 2018 | Wife of Tom Benson, who acquired the team in 1985 | |
| New York Giants | John Mara | 2005 | Principal owner; his grandfather Tim Mara founded the team in 1925. Executive vice president and board chairman Steve Tisch owns 50% of the team through his father Preston Robert Tisch, who acquired that share in 1991. | |
| New York Jets | Woody Johnson | 2000 | Principal owner; his brother Christopher Johnson served that role during Woody's time as the 66th US Ambassador to the UK from November 2017 to January 2021. | |
| Philadelphia Eagles | Jeffrey Lurie | 1994 | | |
| Pittsburgh Steelers | Art Rooney II | 2017 | Part of the Rooney family, with his grandfather Art Rooney founding the team in 1933. | |
| San Francisco 49ers | Jed York | 2009 | Principal owner; his mother Denise DeBartolo York is the daughter of Edward J. DeBartolo Sr., who acquired the team in 1977, and owns roughly the same share. | |
| Seattle Seahawks | Neeru Khosla | 2026 | Controlling owner; her husband Vinod and son Neal also have roles in the ownership group | |
| Tampa Bay Buccaneers | Bryan Glazer | 2014 | Part of the Glazer family, with his father Malcolm Glazer acquiring the team in 1995 | |
| Tennessee Titans | Amy Adams Strunk | 2015 | Daughter of Bud Adams, who founded the team as the Houston Oilers in 1960. | |
| Washington Commanders | Josh Harris | 2023 | Prominent limited partners include Mitchell Rales, Magic Johnson, and Mark Ein. Other investors include David Blitzer, Lee Ainslie, Eric Holoman, Michael Li, Marc Lipschultz, Mitchell Morgan, the Santo Domingo family, Michael Sapir, Eric Schmidt, and Andy Snyder. | |

== See also ==
- List of NHL franchise owners
- List of NBA team owners
- List of Major League Baseball principal owners
- List of MLS team owners
