= Hunt family (Texas) =

American business family

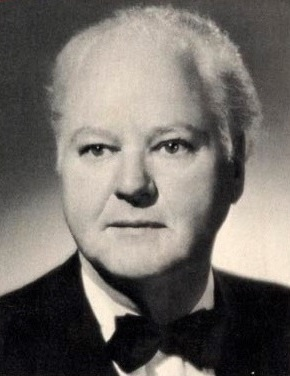
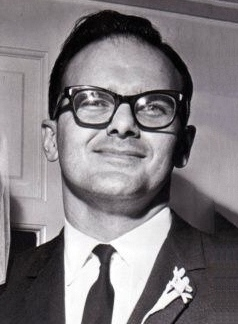
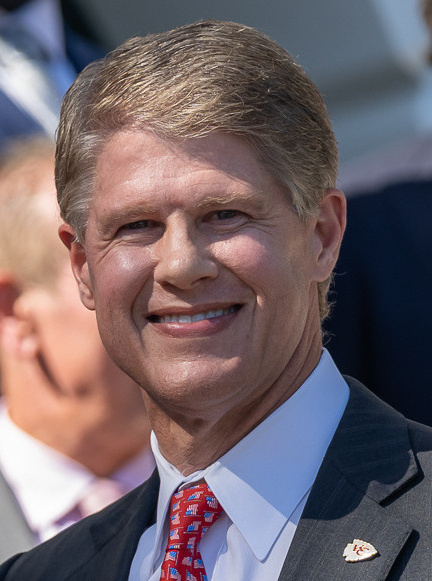
- H. L. Hunt Lamar Hunt Clark Hunt
- Current region: Dallas, Texas; U.S.
- Origin: England
- Founder: Dr. Thomas Hunt Sr.
- Current heads: Ray Lee Hunt (Hunt Consolidated, Inc.) Clark Hunt (Hunt Sports Group)
- Estate: Mount Vernon (Dallas)

The Hunt family is an American business family based in Texas. They are most famous for their involvement in the energy industry via their creation and leadership of the Hunt Oil Company, Hunt Petroleum, Hunt Energy and Petro-Hunt. The family also has significant holdings in the sports, media, hotel and real estate industries. As of 2024, the Hunts were ranked as America's twelfth richest family.

== History ==
Haroldson Lafayette Hunt Jr. was born on February 17, 1889, near Ramsey, Illinois. During the 1930s, he bought the title for the East Texas Oil Field for $1,000,000. Ultimately, H.L. became one of the eight richest Americans until his death on November 29, 1974, with a net worth between $300–700 million.

Over the course of H.L's lifetime and after his death, the Hunt family has used their fortune from the energy industry to invest extensively in sports teams, hotels and real estate. In 2024, Forbes estimated the Hunt family's net worth at $24.8 billion and ranked them as the twelfth richest family in the U.S.

== Family tree ==
- Haroldson Lafeyette Hunt
  - H.L. Hunt Jr.
    - H. L. 'Hassie' Hunt
    - Margaret Hunt Hill
      - Lyda Hill (b.1942)
      - Alinda Wikert
      - Albert Galatyn Hill Jr.
    - Caroline Rose Hunt
    - Nelson Bunker Hunt
    - William Herbert Hunt
    - Lamar Hunt
      - Lamar Hunt Jr.
      - Clark Hunt
        - Gracie Hunt
        - Knobel Hunt
        - Ava Hunt
    - Ray Lee Hunt
      - Hunter L. Hunt
    - June Hunt
    - Helen LaKelly Hunt
      - Haela Hunt-Hendrix
      - Leah Hunt-Hendrix
    - Swanee Hunt

== Businesses ==
The following is a list of businesses in which the Hunt family have held a controlling or otherwise significant interest.

- American Football League
- Chicago Bulls
- Columbus Crew
- D Magazine
- FC Dallas
- Houston City Magazine
- Hunt Energy Enterprises
- Hunt Midwest
- Hunt Oil Company
- Hunt Petroleum
- Hunt Realty Investments
- Kansas City Chiefs
- Kansas City Mavericks
- Petro-Hunt
- Kansas City Wizards
- Rosewood Hotels & Resorts
- Sport
- Titan Resources Corporation
