= William Herbert Hunt =

American oil billionaire (1929–2024)

- Born: March 6, 1929; El Dorado, Arkansas, U.S.
- Died: April 9, 2024 (aged 95); Dallas, Texas, U.S.
- Occupations: Heir, owner of 25% of Halcon
- Children: 5
- Parent(s): H. L. Hunt; Lyda Bunker
- Relatives: Margaret Hunt Hill, Nelson Bunker Hunt, Caroline Rose Hunt, and Lamar Hunt (siblings); Clark Hunt (nephew)

William Herbert Hunt (March 6, 1929 – April 9, 2024) was an American oil billionaire and member of the wealthy Hunt family. He along with his brothers Nelson Bunker Hunt and Lamar Hunt tried but failed to corner the world market in silver. According to Forbes, as of April 2024 his net worth was estimated at US$5.3 billion.

== Early life ==
William Herbert Hunt was born in 1929 to Lyda Bunker and the oil well wildcatter H. L. Hunt.

== Career ==
In the 1970s Hunt and his brother Nelson Bunker Hunt acquired 195 million ounces of silver, worth nearly $10 billion at the peak. When the price of silver collapsed 80% in 1980 the brothers lost their fortune in the silver trading scandal called Silver Thursday; together they lost a billion dollars. William Herbert Hunt went bankrupt in 1990, but was able to recover years later.

In July 1975 Hunt was indicted on obstruction of justice charges alongside his brother Nelson, his lawyer Percy Foreman and others, after it was alleged that two private detectives had been bribed in return for their non-cooperation with the police. They were all acquitted.

In 2012, Hunt sold a minor portion of Petro-Hunt's assets in the Williston Basin to Halcon Resources for $1.45 billion, lifting his net wealth to an estimated $3 billion. Petro-Hunt continues to operate in the Williston Basin, Permian/Delaware Basins and other basins across the US.

== Personal life and death ==
Hunt lived in Dallas, Texas, and had five children. He died there on April 9, 2024, at the age of 95. He was the last surviving child of H. L. Hunt by the latter's first wife Lyda.

His nephew, Clark Hunt, is chairman and CEO of the National Football League's Kansas City Chiefs.
