= Caroline Rose Hunt =

American hotelier and philanthropist

- Born: January 8, 1923; El Dorado, Arkansas, U.S.
- Died: November 13, 2018 (aged 95); Dallas, Texas, U.S.
- Education: Hockaday School
- Alma mater: Mary Baldwin College; University of Texas at Austin
- Occupations: Hotelier, author
- Parent(s): H. L. Hunt; Lyda Bunker

Caroline Rose Hunt (January 8, 1923 – November 13, 2018) was an American hotelier and heiress of the wealthy Hunt family. She was at one time the wealthiest woman in the United States. She is also known for having been the founder of Rosewood Hotels & Resorts, which she opened in 1979.

== Early life ==
Caroline Rose Hunt was born on January 8, 1923, the daughter of oilman H. L. Hunt (1889–1974) and Lyda Bunker (1889–1955). She had six siblings: Margaret Hunt Hill (1915–2007), H. L. Hunt III (1917–2005), Lyda Bunker Hunt (born and died in 1925), Nelson Bunker Hunt (1926–2014), William Herbert Hunt (born 1929), and Lamar Hunt (1932–2006). While she was growing up, the family lived in the east Texas town of Tyler. Hunt said that as a child, she was unaware of the family's wealth until she found a Life magazine picture of her father, "with a caption that asked, 'Is this the richest man in the world?' "

She was educated at the Hockaday School, an all-girl boarding school in Dallas. She then attended Mary Baldwin College, a private women's college in Staunton, Virginia, for two years, until she transferred to the University of Texas at Austin, where she received a Bachelor of Arts degree in English and art history.

== Career ==
Prior to her first marriage, Hunt worked in her father's Dallas office. She later worked as a sales clerk at the Neiman Marcus department store in Dallas. During her first marriage and through much of her second, she focused on her family and charitable work, not holding any job outside the home until she entered the hotel business at age 55.

In 1980, she opened The Mansion Restaurant on Turtle Creek. That same year, Hunt founded Rosewood Hotels & Resorts, where she served as Honorary Chairman at the time of her death. The company owned the Hotel Bel-Air in Bel Air, Los Angeles in the 1980s, but sold it in 1989. It currently owns the Carlyle Hotel on the Upper East Side of Manhattan in New York City, among a portfolio of other luxury hotels. It is a subsidiary of a larger company owned by Hong Kong billionaire Henry Cheng as the result of Hunt's 2011 sale of Rosewood and five of its hotel properties. She was inducted into the North Texas Commercial Association of Realtors Hall of Fame in May 2013.

Hunt had a line of bath and skin products called Lady Primrose, an outgrowth of the English country antiques shop she opened in 1987 with a friend.

In 2000, she wrote a novel, Primrose Past: The 1848 Journal of Young Lady Primrose. She also wrote two cookbooks.

== Philanthropy ==
In 1991, together with her sister Margaret, Hunt paid for the restoration of Hilltop, an 1810 building on the campus of Mary Baldwin College which is listed on the National Register of Historic Places. In 2013, she received the J. Erik Jonsson Award from the United Way of Metropolitan Dallas in thanks for a history of donations to United Way organizations.

Hunt was also a donor to the National Museum of Women in the Arts, the Tiffany Circle of the American Red Cross, The Heritage Foundation, and the James Madison Council of the Library of Congress. She served on the board of trustees of the John F. Kennedy Center for the Performing Arts in Washington, D.C., for ten years. She also served as honorary chair of the Retina Foundation of the Southwest, a non-profit organization for research into macular degeneration — a condition from which Hunt herself suffered — and restoration of vision loss. Hunt donated to many other Dallas cultural and educational organizations.

== Personal life ==
Hunt was married twice. Her first husband was Loyd Bowmer Sands, a pilot in the United States Navy. They had five children; one of their grandchildren is the actress Hassie Harrison, who was married on their estate.

After they divorced in 1973, she married a second time, to Buddy Schoellkopf. They later divorced.

Hunt died on November 13, 2018, at the T. Boone Pickens Hospice and Palliative Care Center in Dallas, at the age of 95 from a stroke.
