= Nelson Bunker Hunt =

American businessman (1926–2014)

- Born: February 22, 1926; El Dorado, Arkansas, U.S.
- Died: October 21, 2014 (aged 88); Dallas, Texas, U.S.
- Occupations: Oil, mining; Racehorse owner
- Political party: Republican
- Spouse: Caroline Lewis (m. 1951)
- Parents: H. L. Hunt; Lyda Bunker
- Relatives: Lamar Hunt (brother); Clark Hunt (nephew)
- Awards: Thoroughbred horse racing: British flat racing Champion Owner (1973, 1974); Eclipse Award for Outstanding Breeder (1985, 1987)

Nelson Bunker Hunt (February 22, 1926 – October 21, 2014) was an American oil company executive and member of the wealthy Hunt family. He was once a billionaire but ultimately lost his fortune after he and his brothers, William Herbert and Lamar, were caught attempting to corner the world market in silver by authorities. He was also a thoroughbred horse breeder and a major sponsor of the John Birch Society.

== Personal ==
Hunt was born in El Dorado, Arkansas, but lived most of his life in Dallas, Texas. He was the son of Lyda Bunker and oil tycoon H. L. Hunt, who set up Placid Oil, once one of the biggest independent oil companies, He had six siblings: Margaret Hunt Hill (1915–2007), H. L. Hunt III (1917–2005), Caroline Rose Hunt (1923–2018), Lyda Bunker Hunt (born and died in 1925), William Herbert Hunt (1929–2024), and Lamar Hunt (1932–2006). He was married to Caroline Lewis Hunt of Ruston, Louisiana, for 63 years until his death, and they had four children together. In October 2014, Hunt died at the age of 88. He had cancer and dementia.

In July 1975 Hunt was indicted on obstruction of justice charges alongside his brother William Herbert Hunt, his lawyer Percy Foreman and others, after it was alleged that two private detectives had been bribed in return for their non-cooperation with the police. They were all acquitted.

== Business career ==
Hunt played a significant role in the discovery and development of the oil fields in Libya, the more established oil enterprises' stake of which were nationalized by Muammar Gaddafi in 1973. This nationalization later resulted in the House of Lords decision in BP Exploration Co (Libya) v Hunt (No 2), [1983] 2 AC 352.

Hunt owned the Dallas-based Titan Resources Corporation, which is still involved in the exploration of oil in North Africa. He was chairman of Hunt Exploration and Mining Company (HEMCO).

== Silver manipulation ==
Beginning in the early 1970s, Hunt and his brothers William Herbert and Lamar began accumulating large amounts of silver on COMEX through Brodsky and Associates. By 1979, they had nearly cornered the global market. In the last nine months of 1979, the brothers profited by an estimated US$2–4 billion in silver speculation, with estimated silver holdings of 100 million troy ounces (3,100 t).

Primarily because of the Hunt brothers' accumulation of the precious metal, prices of silver futures contracts and silver bullion rose from $11 an ounce in September 1979 to $50 an ounce in January 1980. Silver prices ultimately collapsed to below $11 an ounce two months later. The largest single-day drop in the price of silver occurred on "Silver Thursday". In February 1985 the Hunt brothers were charged "with manipulating and attempting to manipulate the prices of silver futures contracts and silver bullion during 1979 and 1980" by the United States Commodity Futures Trading Commission (CFTC).

In September 1988 the Hunt brothers filed for bankruptcy under Chapter 11 of the Federal Bankruptcy Code largely due to lawsuits incurred as a result of their silver speculation.

In 1989, in a settlement with the CFTC, Nelson Bunker Hunt was fined $10 million and banned from trading in the commodity markets as a result of civil charges of conspiring to manipulate the silver market. This fine was in addition to a multimillion-dollar settlement to pay back taxes, fines and interest to the Internal Revenue Service for the same period. His brother William Herbert Hunt made a similar settlement.

== Politics ==
Hunt was active in conservative political causes and was a member of the council of the John Birch Society. Among the candidates he supported financially were the fervent segregationists Sen. Strom Thurmond and George Wallace. Hunt was sharply critical of John F. Kennedy. He sponsored an advertisement in the Dallas Morning News when Kennedy visited Dallas in November 1963, accusing him of having "scrapped the Monroe Doctrine in favour of the 'Spirit of Moscow'". He played a key role in the 1968 presidential campaign in rejecting Wallace's first vice presidential choice, former Kentucky governor Happy Chandler, whom Hunt considered too moderate, and making possible the selection of Curtis LeMay. When LeMay balked at losing his salaried job if he joined the Wallace campaign, Hunt created a secret, $1 million trust fund to compensate LeMay for loss of income.

Hunt mentored Zahid Bashir, former spokesman and press secretary to the Pakistani Prime Minister, in oil trading. He was one of the main sponsors of the conservative organization Western Goals Foundation, founded in 1979 by General John K. Singlaub, journalist John Rees, and Democratic Congressman from Georgia Larry McDonald. During the mid-1980s, he contributed almost half a million U.S. dollars to The National Endowment for the Preservation of Liberty (NEPL), a conservative fundraising organization later heavily implicated in the Iran–Contra affair. Hunt was past chairman of the board of the Bible Society of Texas and the past chairman of, and significant contributor to Campus Crusade for Christ International's "Here's Life" Campaign (1976–1980), as well as providing a $3.5 million loan guarantee for the 1979 Campus Crusade film Jesus. In 1981 he was a founding member of the Council for National Policy.

== Thoroughbred horse racing ==
In 1955, Hunt bought his first thoroughbreds and by the 1970s his breeding program had become one of the world's largest and most productive. Winner of the U.S. Eclipse Award for Outstanding Breeder in 1976, 1985, and 1987, he owned the 8,000-acre (3,200 ha) Bluegrass Farm in Lexington, Kentucky, and raced thoroughbreds in Europe and North America. Among his horses, Hunt bred or raced Vaguely Noble, Dahlia, Empery, Youth, Exceller, Trillion, Glorious Song, Dahar and Estrapade.

In 1973 and 1974, Hunt was the British flat racing Champion Owner and in 1976 won The Derby with Empery.

The United States National Thoroughbred Racing Association (NTRA) awarded Hunt the title of "legendary owner-breeder". Overall, Hunt bred 158 stakes winners and either bred or owned 25 champions.

Hunt's bankruptcy forced him to liquidate his thoroughbred operations. A 1988 dispersal sale of 580 horses at Keeneland Sales brought in $46,911,800, at that time the highest amount in the history of thoroughbred auctions. In 1999, he returned to thoroughbred ownership, spending a total of $2,075,000 on 51 juveniles and yearlings. At the time he said, "At my age, I don't plan to do any breeding or buy a farm, I just want to have some fun and try to get lucky racing."
