= H. L. Hunt =

American businessman (1889–1974)

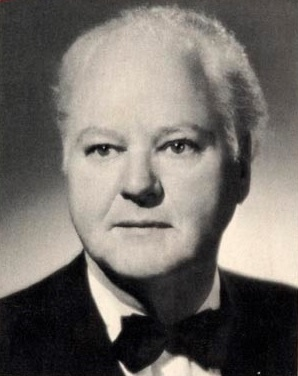
- From print ad for Hunt's 1965 book Hunt for Truth: A Timely Collection of the Stimulating Daily Newspaper Columns of H. L. Hunt
- Born: Haroldson Lafayette Hunt; February 17, 1889; Ramsey, Illinois, U.S.
- Died: November 29, 1974 (aged 85); Dallas, Texas, U.S.
- Occupation: Petroleum industry
- Spouses: Ruth Ray (m. 1957–1974) Frania Tye (m. 1925; ann. 1941) (bigamy) Lyda Bunker (m. 1914; died 1955)
- Children: 15, including Margaret, Caroline Rose, Nelson Bunker, William Herbert, Lamar, Ray Lee, June, Helen, and Swanee Hunt
- Relatives: Lyda Hill (granddaughter); Lamar Hunt Jr. (grandson); Clark Hunt (grandson); Hunter L. Hunt (grandson); Haela Hunt-Hendrix (granddaughter); Leah Hunt-Hendrix (granddaughter); Hassie Harrison (great-granddaughter); Harville Hendrix (son-in-law); Charles Ansbacher (son-in-law); Tom Hunt (nephew)

Haroldson Lafayette Hunt Jr. (February 17, 1889 – November 29, 1974) was an American oil tycoon and the founding patriarch of the Hunt business dynasty. Most likely through money he gained by speculating in oil leases (though legend claims it was poker winnings), he gradually secured title to much of the East Texas Oil Field, one of the world's largest oil deposits. His first such land purchase was from oil speculator Columbus Marion Joiner for $30,000, and he founded Hunt Oil in 1936.

From that acquisition and others including diverse interests in publishing, cosmetics, pecan farming, and health food producers, he accrued a fortune which was among the world's largest. In the 1950s, his Facts Forum Foundation supported far-right newspaper columns and radio programs, some of which he authored and produced himself, and for which he became known. At the time of his death, he was reputed to have one of the highest net worths of any individual in the world, estimated between $2 billion and $3 billion.

== Life ==
Hunt was born near Ramsey in Carson Township, Illinois, the youngest of eight children. He was named after his father, Haroldson Lafayette Hunt, who was a prosperous farmer-entrepreneur. His mother was Ella Rose (Myers) Hunt. His grandfather, Waddy Hunt, was a Confederate cavalry officer for the 27th Arkansas Infantry Regiment during the American Civil War and was murdered by Quantrill's Raiders in 1864, after being mistaken for a Union sympathizer.

Hunt was homeschooled. He did not go to elementary school or to high school. Later, he said that education is an obstacle to making money. As a teenager, Hunt traveled to different places before he settled in Arkansas, where he was running a cotton plantation by 1912. He had a reputation as a math prodigy and was a gambler. Hunt is reported in internal FBI memoranda to have run prostitution activities in Arkansas and, later in the 1950s, a private horse racing and gambling bookmaking operation from his office in Dallas.

It was said that after his cotton plantation was flooded, he turned his last $100 into more than $100,000 after he had gambled in New Orleans. With his winnings, he purchased oil properties in El Dorado southeast of Texarkana, Arkansas. He was generous to his employees, who in turn were loyal to him by informing him of rumors of a massive oil field to the south, in East Texas. In negotiations over cheese and crackers, at the Baker Hotel in Dallas, with the wild-catter who discovered the East Texas Oil Field, Columbus Marion "Dad" Joiner, Hunt secured title to what was the largest known oil deposit in the world. Hunt had agreed to pay Joiner $1,000,000 and to protect him from liability for his many fraudulent transactions surrounding the property.

In 1957, Fortune estimated that Hunt had a fortune of $400–700 million, and was one of the eight richest people in the United States. J. Paul Getty, who was considered to be the richest private citizen in the world, said of Hunt, "In terms of extraordinary, independent wealth, there is only one man—H. L. Hunt." Hunt, alongside his fellow Texan businessmen D. Harold Byrd, Stanley Marcus and Roy Mark Hofheinz, was a subject of the 1968 BBC documentary The Plutocrats, about the ultra-rich of Texas.

== Personal life ==
External videos
- "H. L. Hunt: The Richest and the Rightest." NET Journal, Ep. 149. (August 21, 1967). Houston, Texas: KUHT-TV. American Archive of Public Broadcasting.

Hunt had fifteen children by three wives. He and Lyda Bunker of Lake Village, southeast of Pine Bluff, Arkansas were married in November 1914 and remained married until her death in 1955. His seven children by her were: Margaret (1915–2007), Haroldson ("Hassie", 1917–2005), Caroline (1923–2018), Lyda (born and died in 1925), Nelson Bunker (1926–2014), William Herbert (1929–2024), and Lamar (1932–2006). Their home on White Rock Lake in Dallas was styled after Mount Vernon though much larger.

His first son, Hassie, who was expected to succeed him in control of the family business, was lobotomized in response to increasingly erratic behavior. He outlived his father. Lamar founded the American Football League and created the Super Bowl, drawing on the assistance of his children in selecting the game's name. Two other children, Herbert and Bunker, are famous for their purchasing much of the world's silver, in an attempt to corner the market. They ultimately owned more silver than any government in the world before their scheme was discovered and undone. Bunker Hunt was briefly one of the wealthiest men in the world, having discovered and taken title to the Libyan oil fields, before Muammar Gaddafi nationalized the properties.

While still married to Lyda, H. L. Hunt is said to have married Frania Tye of Tampa, Florida, in November 1925 by using the name Franklin Hunt. Frania claimed to have discovered the bigamous nature of her marriage in 1934, and in a legal settlement in 1941, Hunt created trust funds for each of their four children, and she signed a document stipulating that no legal marriage between them had ever existed. About the same time, she briefly married then divorced Hunt's employee, John Lee, taking the last name Lee for herself and her four children. Frania's four children by Hunt were: Howard (born 1926), Haroldina (1928), Helen (1930), and Hugh ("Hue", 1934). Frania Tye Lee died in 2002.

Hunt supported and had children by Ruth Ray of Shreveport to the northwest of Alexandria, Louisiana, whom he had met when she was a secretary in his Shreveport office. They married in 1957 after the death of Hunt's wife Lyda. His four children by Ray were Ray Lee (born 1943), June (1944), Helen (1949), and Swanee (1950). His youngest son, Ray Lee, inherited the business and was a major supporter of President George W. Bush. Hunt's 15 children in birth order are:

1. Margaret Hunt Hill (October 19, 1915 – June 14, 2007); philanthropist and co-owner of Hunt Petroleum
2. H. L. "Hassie" Hunt III (November 23, 1917 – April 20, 2005); diagnosed with schizophrenia in the early 1940s; co-owner of Hunt Petroleum
3. Caroline Rose Hunt (January 8, 1923 – November 13, 2018); founder and honorary chairman of Rosewood Hotels & Resorts, which operates The Mansion on Turtle Creek
4. Lyda Bunker Hunt (February 19, 1925 – March 20, 1925) (died as an infant)
5. Nelson Bunker Hunt (February 22, 1926 – October 21, 2014), a major force in developing Libyan oil field; eventually attempted to corner the world market in silver in 1979 and was convicted of conspiring to manipulate the market; legendary owner-breeder of Thoroughbred racehorses
6. Howard Lee Hunt (October 25, 1926 – October 13, 1975)
7. Haroldina Franch Hunt (October 26, 1928 – November 10, 1995)
8. William Herbert Hunt (March 6, 1929 – April 9, 2024); ran Hunt Oil, Hunt Petroleum, Hunt Energy, Placid Oil, etc.; founder of Petro-Hunt LLC
9. Helen Lee Cartledge Hunt (October 28, 1930 – June 3, 1962); died in the Air France Flight 007 disaster in Paris, the worst single aircraft disaster up until that time
10. Lamar Hunt (August 2, 1932 – December 13, 2006); co-founder of the American Football League and the North American Soccer League; owner of the Kansas City Chiefs of the National Football League; owner of the Columbus Crew and FC Dallas of Major League Soccer; backer of World Championship Tennis; impetus behind 1966 AFL-NFL merger; coined the name "Super Bowl"
11. Hugh S. Hunt (October 14, 1934 – November 12, 2002); lived in Potomac, Maryland, founder of Constructivist Foundation
12. Ray Lee Hunt (born c. 1943); chairman of Hunt Oil
13. June Hunt (born c. 1944); host of a daily religious radio show, Hope for the Heart
14. Helen LaKelly Hunt (born c. 1949); a pastoral counselor in Dallas; co-manager of the Hunt Alternatives Fund, one of the family's charitable arms
15. Swanee Hunt (born May 1, 1950); former U.S. ambassador to Austria; now head of the Women and Public Policy Program at the John F. Kennedy School of Government in Cambridge, Massachusetts and president of the Hunt Alternatives Fund

A scandal emerged in 1975, after Hunt's death, when it was discovered that he had a hidden bigamous relationship with his second wife living in New York. After his marriage to Ruth Ray, Hunt became a Baptist and was a member of the First Baptist Church of Dallas. He was a major financial contributor toward the establishment of the conservative Christian evangelical Criswell College in Dallas. After several months at Baylor Hospital in Dallas, Hunt died at age 85, and was buried in Sparkman-Hillcrest Memorial Park Cemetery in Dallas. Haela Hunt-Hendrix, who formed the transcendental black metal band Liturgy, is his grandchild. H. L. Hunt served as inspiration behind the character J. R. Ewing from the television show Dallas.

== Politics ==
Beginning in the early 1950s, Hunt was heavily involved in radio, being described as among "four of the era’s most prominent extremist broadcasters", alongside Dan Smoot, Carl McIntire, and Billy James Hargis. Among his programs were "Facts Forum", "Answers for Americans", and "Life Line". Through "Facts Forum", Hunt became a prominent supporter of Senator Joseph McCarthy, utilizing the platform to amplify anti-communist investigations in the early 1950s.

Hunt supported the Dixiecrats, viewing the rest of the Democratic Party as an "instrument of socialism and Communism in this country". Hunt supported Douglas MacArthur in the 1948 Republican Party presidential primaries, describing him as "truly the man of this century". In 1952, Hunt again supported MacArthur, reportedly spending $150,000 on his campaign. He helped organize the pro-MacArthur faction in Texas and set up a campaign headquarters in Chicago. Hunt ultimately supported Dwight D. Eisenhower in both the 1952 and 1956 general elections, although the two maintained a strained relationship. In a 1954 private letter, Eisenhower characterized Hunt and a "few other Texas oil millionaires" as "stupid" for their opposition to "Social Security, unemployment insurance, and ... labor laws and farm programs". Eisenhower argued that Hunt's desire to abolish these New Deal-era programs was politically non-viable and would lead to the disappearance of any party that attempted it.

In 1960, Hunt supported Lyndon B. Johnson's presidential bid, primarily due to Johnson's advocacy for the oil depletion allowance. Despite Johnson ultimately joining the Democratic ticket as John F. Kennedy's vice-presidential running mate, Hunt continued his support for the Democratic campaign through the general election that year. In 1962, Hunt backed Edwin Walker's primary campaign for governor of Texas; Walker finished last.

Hunt strongly opposed Kennedy's policy of rapprochement with the USSR. In July 1963, in reference to the negotiations of what would culminate in the Nuclear Test Ban Treaty, he stated, "The U.S. may be negotiating its early demise at the nuclear test-ban conference in Moscow." With regard to the Arms Control and Disarmament Act of 1961, Hunt said, "If the disarmament authorized by this law were put into effect there may be no Air Force Academy, no West Point, no Annapolis, no private firearms—no defense!". He was a critic of the United Nations, which was for him as bad "as it could possibly be" and advocated withdrawal from the organization unless the United States was given "a greater vote in the General Assembly than small heathen nations". In 1964 he supported the Republican Barry Goldwater for president. Previously he had contributed $3000 for his senatorial run in 1952. In 1965, Hunt encouraged Alabama Gov. George C. Wallace, a white supremacist, to use the scheme of running his wife, Lurleen Wallace, for election as governor in a bold effort to evade the state's constitutional rule that a governor could not succeed himself.

Multiple sources, including American civil rights leader Malcolm X, implicate Hunt as a lifelong racist who provided major financial assistance to several far-right organizations, such as the Minutemen and the John Birch Society. Hunt considered African Americans a political threat and made this clear in his radio interviews and broadcasts. One of Hunt's chief allies, Allen Zoll, said that since 1936 Hunt advocated deporting all African Americans to Africa. For this reason, Hunt supplied Nation of Islam leader Elijah Muhammad continuous financial support due to the latter's belief in racial separation from whites. Hunt attended meetings of the Christian Anti-Communism Crusade, co-founded the International Committee for the Defense of Christian Culture, and funded Billy James Hargis's Christian Crusade.

== JFK conspiracy allegations ==
Madeleine Duncan Brown, an advertising executive who claimed to have had both an extended love affair and a son with President Lyndon B. Johnson, said that she was present at a party at the Dallas home of Clint Murchison Sr. (another oil tycoon), on the evening prior to the assassination of John F. Kennedy which was attended by Johnson as well as other famous, wealthy, and powerful individuals including Hunt, Murchison, J. Edgar Hoover, and Richard Nixon.

According to Brown, Johnson had a meeting with several of the men after which he told her: "After tomorrow, those goddamn Kennedys will never embarrass me again. That's no threat. That's a promise." (Note: Brown provided a similar account on A Current Affair stating: "On the day of the assassination, not but a couple of hours prior to the assassination, he said that John Kennedy would never embarrass him again and that wasn't a threat – that was a promise.") Brown's story received national attention and became part of at least a dozen John F. Kennedy assassination conspiracy theories. Kennedy assassination investigator Dave Perry refuted this theory with evidence showing neither President Johnson nor Hoover were in Dallas at the time of the alleged party and Murchison had not lived in his Dallas home for a number of years. Witnesses place Murchison at his East Texas ranch.

== Publications ==
Books

- Fabians Fight Freedom. Dallas: H. L. Hunt Press
- Alpaca. Dallas: H. L. Hunt Press (1960)
- Why Not Speak? Dallas: H. L. Hunt Press (1964)
- Hunt for Truth: A Timely Collection of the Stimulating Daily Newspaper Columns of H. L. Hunt. Dallas: H. L. Hunt Press (1965)
- Alpaca Revisited. Dallas: HLH Products (1967)
- H. L. Hunt: Early Days. Dallas: Parade (1973)
- Hunt Heritage: The Republic and Our Families. Dallas: Parade (1973)
- Right of Average. Dallas: HLH Products (1960s)

Articles

- "From H. L. Hunt." American [Odessa, Texas] (Feb. 2, 1967).
- "Reducing Hospital Costs." Life Lines, vol. 16, no. 4 (Jan. 9, 1974), p. 4. JSTOR community.28146704.

== See also ==
- Walter L. Buenger, historian at Texas A&M University, in 1994 wrote the Hunt biography in Dictionary of American Biography.
- Hunt Oil Company
- List of richest Americans in history
- Hunt family

== General sources ==
- Brown, Stanley H. (1976) H. L. Hunt. Chicago: Playboy Press. ISBN 978-0872234499. OCLC 2164939.
- Burrough, Bryan. (2010) The Big Rich: The Rise and Fall of the Greatest Texas Oil Fortunes. New York: Penguin Press. ISBN 978-0143116820. OCLC 430052039.
