= List of owners of Major League Soccer teams =

Major League Soccer team owners

Major League Soccer owners own a share in Major League Soccer and are granted the right to operate a team. MLS operates under a single-entity structure in which teams and player contracts are centrally owned by Major League Soccer LLC, which owns all logos and names as trademarks. A shareholder in the league is granted to operate one or more MLS teams . In order to control costs, the league shares revenues and holds players contracts instead of players contracting with individual teams.

The league has 30 investor-operators for its 30 teams. AEG, which at one time invested in six clubs, solely operates one team (LA Galaxy). Lamar Hunt used to operate multiple teams, but now Hunt Sports only operates one team (FC Dallas). One of the league's teams is operated, at least in part, by neither Americans nor Canadians — Austrian Red Bull GmbH (New York Red Bulls).

== History ==
To construct the league in such a single ownership structure, having multiple teams operated by a single investor was a necessity in the league's first ten years. At one time Phil Anschutz's AEG operated six MLS clubs, and Lamar Hunt's Hunt Sports operated three teams. In order to attract additional investors, in 2002 the league announced changes to the operating agreement between the league and its teams to improve team revenues and increase the incentives to be an individual team operator. These changes included granting operators the rights to a certain number of players they develop through their teams's academy system each year, sharing the profits of Soccer United Marketing, and being able to sell individual team jersey sponsorships.

As MLS appeared to be on the brink of overall profitability in 2006 and developed significant expansion plans, MLS announced that it wanted each team to have a distinct operator. The league has attracted new investors that have injected more money into the operation. Examples include Red Bull's purchase of the operation rights of the MetroStars from AEG in 2006 for over $100 million.

== Fraser ==
In Fraser v. Major League Soccer, a lawsuit filed in 1996 and decided in 2002, the league won a legal battle with its players in which the court ruled that MLS was a single entity that can lawfully centrally contract for player services. The court also ruled that even absent their collective bargaining agreement, players could opt to play in other leagues if they were unsatisfied.

== List of MLS operators by team ==
As of April 2025

Austin FC

- Anthony Precourt (Two Oak Ventures LLC) (2018–present)

Atlanta United FC

- Arthur Blank (2014–present)

Charlotte FC

- David Tepper (2019–present)

Chicago Fire

- Anschutz Entertainment Group (1997–2007)
- Andrew Hauptman (Andell Holdings) (2007–2019)
- Joe Mansueto (2019–present)

Colorado Rapids

- Anschutz Entertainment Group (1995–2003)
- Kroenke Sports & Entertainment (2003–present)

Columbus Crew

- Lamar Hunt (1995–2006)
- Clark Hunt (2006–2013)
- Anthony Precourt (Precourt Sports Ventures LLC) (2013–2018)
- Jimmy Haslam, Dee Haslam, Peter H. Edwards Jr., and other investors (Columbus Partnership) (2018–present)

D.C. United

- Washington Soccer, LP (1995–2000)
- Anschutz Entertainment Group (2001–2006)
- William Chang (D.C. United Holdings) (2006–2012)
- William Chang, Erick Thohir and Jason Levien (2012–2018)
- Jason Levien and Steven Kaplan (2018–present)

FC Cincinnati

- Carl Lindner III, Chris Lindner, David L. Thompson, Jeff Berding, Scott Farmer, Steve Hightower, George Joseph, Mike Mossel, Jack Wyant (2018–present)
  - Meg Whitman, Griff Harsh (minority) (2019–present)

FC Dallas

- Major League Soccer (1995–2001)
- Lamar Hunt (2001–2006)
- Clark Hunt (2006–present)

Houston Dynamo

- Anschutz Entertainment Group (2005–2008)
- Anschutz Entertainment Group, Oscar De La Hoya (through Golden Boy Promotions) and Gabriel Brener (2008–2015)
- Gabriel Brener, Oscar De La Hoya, Jake Silverstein, Ben Guill (2015–2021)
  - James Harden became a member of this group in 2019, purchasing a 5% stake.
- Ted Segal (2021–present)

Inter Miami CF

- David Beckham, Simon Fuller, Marcelo Claure, Jorge and José Mas, Masayoshi Son (2018–present)

LA Galaxy

- L.A. Soccer Partners, LP (1995–1997)
- Anschutz Entertainment Group (1998–present)

Los Angeles FC

- Peter Guber (Executive Chairman), Henry Nguyen, Tom Penn, Ruben Gnanalingam, Vincent Tan, Brandon Beck, Larry Berg, Will Ferrell, Nomar Garciaparra, Mia Hamm, Chad Hurley, Magic Johnson, Tucker Kain, Kirk Lacob, Mark Leschly, Mike Mahan, Irwin Raij, Tony Robbins, Lon Rosen, Bennett Rosenthal, Paul Schaeffer, Brandon Schneider, Mark Shapiro, Allen Shapiro, Jason Sugarman, Harry Tsao (2014–present)
  - Larry Berg, Brandon Beck, and Bennett Rosenthal are managing operators

Minnesota United FC

- Bill McGuire, Jim Pohlad, Robert Pohlad, Glen Taylor, Wendy Carlson Nelson (2015–present)

CF Montréal

- Joey Saputo (2010–present)

Nashville SC

- John Ingram (2017–present)
  - Mark Wilf, Zygi Wilf, Leonard Wilf (minority) (2020–2021)
  - Derrick Henry, Jim Toth, Reese Witherspoon (minority) (2022–present)
  - Antetokounmpo brothers (Giannis, Thanasis, Kostas, Alex), Filip Forsberg (minority) (2023–present)

New England Revolution

- Robert Kraft and family (1995–present)

New York City FC

- City Football Group (majority) and Yankee Global Enterprises (minority) (2013–present)

New York Red Bulls

- John Kluge and Stuart Subotnick (1995–01)
- Anschutz Entertainment Group (2001–06)
- Red Bull GmbH (2006–present)

Orlando City SC

- Flávio Augusto da Silva (2013–2021)
- Mark Wilf, Zygi Wilf, Leonard Wilf (2021–present)

Philadelphia Union

- Jay Sugarman (Keystone Sports & Entertainment, LLC) (2008–present)

Portland Timbers

- Merritt Paulson (Peregrine Sports, LLC) (2009–present)

Real Salt Lake

- Dave Checketts (SCP Worldwide) (2004–12)
- Dell Loy Hansen (2012–2021)
- David Blitzer and Ryan Smith (2022–2025)
- Miller Sports + Entertainment (majority) and David Blitzer (minority) (2025–present)

San Diego FC

- Mohamed Mansour, Sycuan Band of the Kumeyaay Nation, Manny Machado, Juan Mata, Issa Rae, Tems, and Jocko Willink

San Jose Earthquakes

- Major League Soccer (1996–1998)
- Robert Kraft (1999–2000)
- Silicon Valley Sports & Entertainment (2001–2002)
- Silicon Valley Sports & Entertainment and Anschutz Entertainment Group (2002–2003)
- Anschutz Entertainment Group (2003–2005)
- John J. Fisher (Earthquakes Soccer, LLC) (2007–2026)
- Heath Freeman (2026–present)

Seattle Sounders FC

- Joe Roth (2007–2015)
  - Adrian Hanauer, Paul Allen and Drew Carey (minority)
- Adrian Hanauer (2015–2018)
  - Paul Allen, Drew Carey and Joe Roth (minority)
- Adrian Hanauer (2018–2019)
  - Drew Carey, Joe Roth, and Estate of Paul Allen (minority)
- Adrian Hanauer, Jody Allen, Drew Carey, Peter Tomozawa, Terry Myerson and Katie Myerson, Russell Wilson and Ciara, Macklemore and Tricia Davis, Satya Nadella and Anu Nadella, Amy Hood and Max Kleinman, Joe Belfiore and Kristina Belfiore, S. Somasegar and Akila Somasegar, Chee Chew and Christine Chew, David Nathanson and Sabina Nathanson, Brian McAndrews and Elise Holschuh, Mark Agne and Tomoko Agne (2019–present)
  - Tod Leiweke and Tara Leiweke and Ken Griffey Jr. and Melissa Griffey were added in 2020.

Sporting Kansas City

- Lamar Hunt (1995–2006)
- Sporting Club (2006–present)
  - Peter Mallouk (2026–present)

St. Louis City SC

- Carolyn Kindle, Jo Ann Taylor Kindle and Jim Kavanaugh (2019–present)

Toronto FC

- Maple Leaf Sports & Entertainment (2006–present)

Vancouver Whitecaps FC

- Greg Kerfoot, Steve Luczo, Jeff Mallett and Steve Nash (2009–present)

== List of defunct MLS teams ==
Chivas USA

- Jorge Vergara and Antonio Cué Sánchez-Navarro (2004–2012)
- Jorge Vergara (2012–2014)
- Major League Soccer (2014)

Miami Fusion

- Ken Horowitz (1997–2001)

Tampa Bay Mutiny

- Major League Soccer (1995–2001)
