= Zahid Bashir =

Pakistani spokesman

- زاہد بشیر
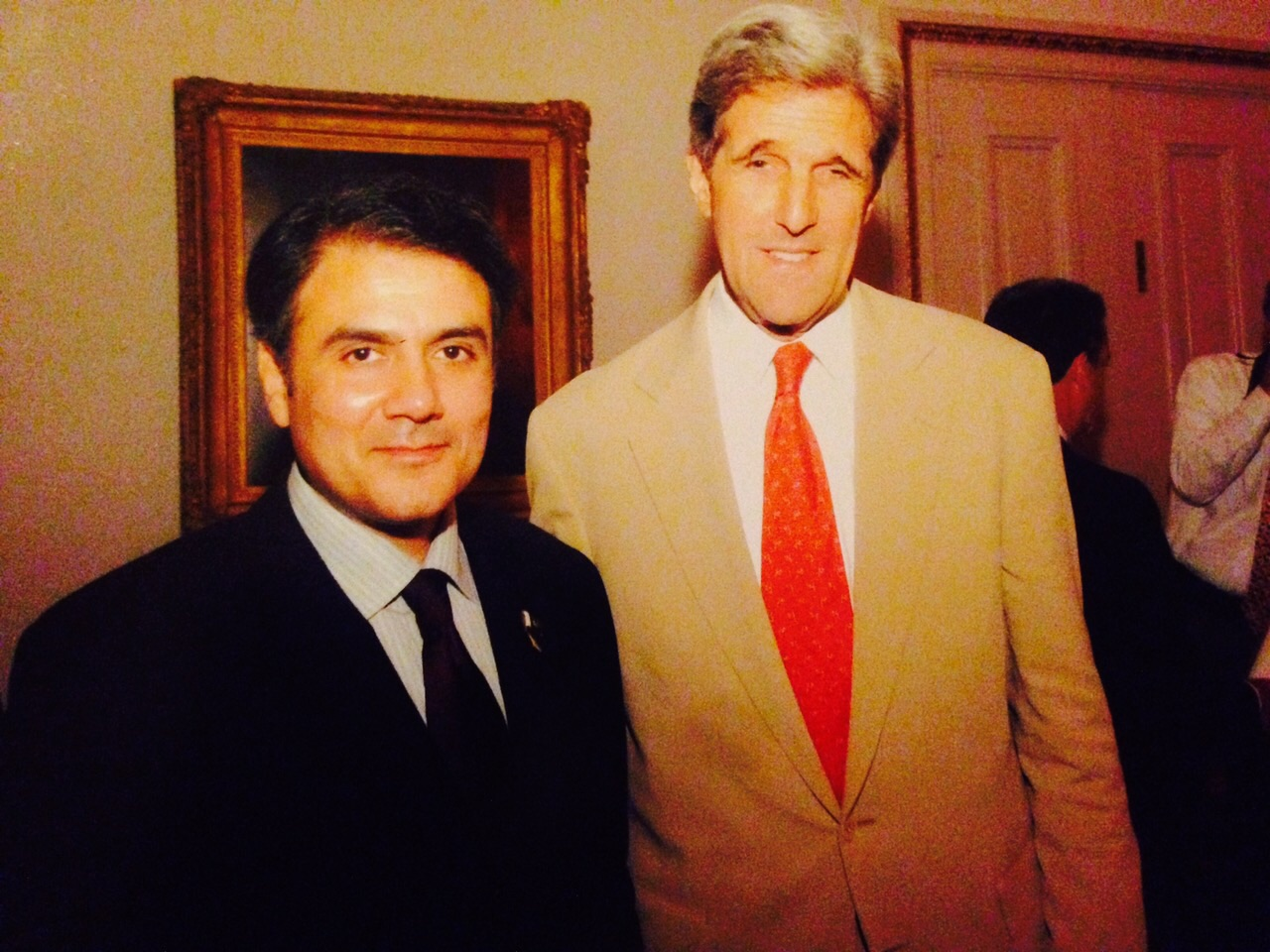
- Zahid Bashir with then-U.S. Senator, John Kerry

Former spokesman to the Prime Minister of Pakistan

Zahid Bashir (Urdu: زاہد بشیر) is the former spokesman and press secretary to the Prime Minister of Pakistan.

He had been the chairman of red crescent Punjab, director general of Pakistan post, senior adviser to governor of Punjab and director marketing of Pakistan cricket board.

In the early 80's Zahid worked in the oil trade Nelson Bunker Hunt, a Texas oil baron once known to be the richest man in the world, who played a very significant role in the discovery and development of the oil fields in Libya, which were nationalized by Muammar Gaddafi in 1973.

Zahid owns a group of companies called Budget Petroleum Trading LLC & Budget Gold Dubai in UAE and Budget Security Systems and Services Private Ltd in Pakistan.
