= Hunt Petroleum =

Oil and gas exploration and production company formed in 1950 and purchased in 2008

Hunt Petroleum Corporation was an oil and gas exploration and production company formed in 1950 that was originally owned and controlled by members of the Hunt family. The company was originally called Petrol Production Co. and was later renamed Hunt Petroleum Corporation. The company was a Delaware corporation owned 52.84% by the Margaret Hunt Trust Estate and 47.16% by the Haroldson L. Hunt, Jr. Trust Estate. The primary beneficiaries of these two trusts are the two eldest children of the late H. L. Hunt and Lyda Bunker Hunt. Hunt Petroleum Corporation had no common ownership and was not affiliated with any of the following entities: Hunt Oil Company; Petro-Hunt, LLC; Hunt Exploration; Unity Hunt; Hunt Properties; or Rosewood Resources.

On June 10, 2008, Fort Worth based XTO Energy announced its purchase of Hunt Petroleum for $4.19 billion. Presently, Hunt Petroleum's assets are under the ownership of ExxonMobil, as XTO was acquired by the Standard Oil descendant in 2010.
