= Ray Lee Hunt =

American heir and businessman (born 1943)

Ray Hunt
- Born: Ray Lee Hunt; 1943 (age 82–83)
- Other name: R. L. Hunt
- Education: Southern Methodist University (BA)
- Political party: Republican
- Children: Hunter
- Parent: H. L. Hunt
- Relatives: Swanee Hunt; June Hunt; Helen LaKelly Hunt

Ray Lee Hunt (born 1943) is an American billionaire, businessman, and scion of the Hunt family.

== Early life ==
Hunt is the son of the late H. L. Hunt (1889–1974), founder of Hunt Oil Co. His parents married in 1957. Hunt's sisters include June Hunt, Swanee Hunt, and Helen LaKelly Hunt.

== Education ==
Hunt is a graduate of Southern Methodist University in the Dallas enclave of University Park, Texas.

== Career ==
After his father's death in 1974, he inherited Hunt Oil Co. and the remains of the General American Oil Company along with his three sisters. In 1982, Forbes magazine estimated Ray Hunt's family's total net worth to be $200 million. In 2006 Forbes estimated that Ray's family's net worth increased from $200 million to $4.6 billion.

In September 2007, Hunt struck an oil deal with the Kurdistan Regional Government in the disputed territories of Ninewa near the Dohuk Governorate with an estimated value of $8 to $14.5 billion. The federal Iraqi Oil minister has denounced this deal as illegal, because under current Iraqi law only the central government is authorized to enter into contracts, though the Kurdistan Region believes it has a constitutional right to do so. The Kurds refuse to share details about the deal but insist that they will share profits. Likewise, Hunt Oil has refused to answer questions about the deal from US government officials who called for details when the deal became public. A U.S. Congressional committee concluded that George W. Bush administration officials knew that Hunt oil was planning to sign the oil deal with the regional Kurdistan Regional Government that ran counter to American policy and undercut Iraq's central government. The issue is still open and the State Department's Office of Inspector General is reviewing the issue.

In November 2009, native Peruvians under the coalition of the Native Federation of the Rio Madre de Dios, (FENAMAD), issued an eviction notice to Ray Hunt and the Hunt Oil Company from the Amarakaeri Communal Reserve. In the letter FENAMAD wrote, "Having peacefully exhausted all protest, without receiving any answer, we hereby communicate to you that we have agreed to a fifteen-day period for you to definitively withdraw from the Amarakaeria Communal Reserve since you do not have the indigenous community's consent." A press release issued by Amazon Watch stated that "The Reserve was first established in 2002 after years of indigenous petitioning to protect the rainforest area of the vast Madre de Dios and Karene watersheds and to provide protected zones for the Harakmbut indigenous peoples to live, fish, and hunt. The area in dispute, besides being a declared nature reserve, crosses the headwaters of several important river basins, and lies in the buffer zones of Manu and Bahuaja Sonene National Parks, two of the most biodiverse national parks in the world."

He is the former owner of the Southwest Media Corporation of Texas which published D Magazine, Houston City Magazine, Texas Homes and Sport Magazine.

== Political donations ==
Hunt was a major supporter of former President of the United States George W. Bush and a member of the President's Foreign Intelligence Advisory Board. He serves on the Board of Trustees of his alma mater, SMU, and of the George W. Bush Presidential Center. In 2015, Hunt and his wife donated $2 million to a Super PAC supporting the presidential candidacy of Jeb Bush.

== Other donations ==
Hunt is also a major donor to the SMU athletic program. He was one of a group of roughly 15 boosters who played a major role in the university's impending 2024 move from the American Athletic Conference to the Atlantic Coast Conference (ACC). The group's members committed to making athletic donations large enough to allow the school to forego any ACC media revenue for its first nine years as an ACC member.

== Personal life ==
Hunt is married and has five children. Hunt's son, Hunter L. Hunt, is the CEO of Hunt Consolidated Energy. Hunt lives in Dallas, Texas. As of 2015, Forbes estimated Hunt's net worth to be US$6 billion, and a 2023 Yahoo Sports story placed his net worth at $7.5 billion.

== See also ==
- Notable alumni of St. Mark's School of Texas
