= Lamar Hunt Jr. =

American businessman and sports promoter (born 1956)

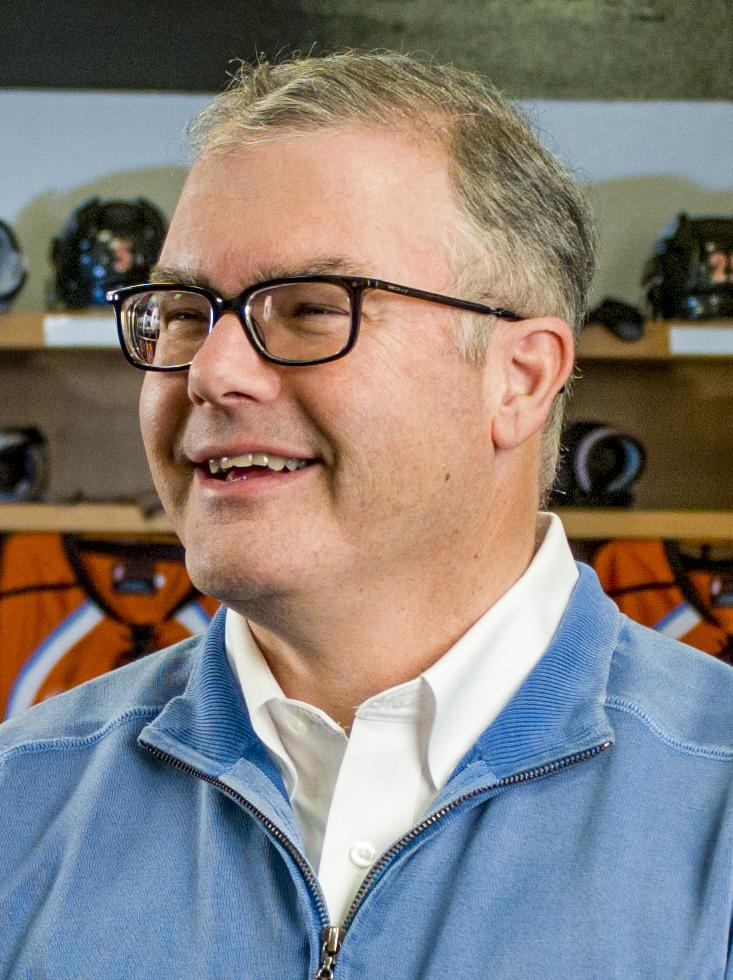
- Lamar Hunt Jr
- Born: October 20, 1956 (age 70); Dallas, Texas, U.S.
- Education: University of Cincinnati College-Conservatory of Music
- Occupations: Franchise Owner & President of Kansas City Mavericks Founder Loretto Companies
- Known for: Owner of the Kansas City Mavericks ice hockey team, advisory board member for the Kansas City Chiefs
- Spouse: Rita Mae Hammerschmidt (m. 2003)
- Children: 7
- Parent: Lamar Hunt (father)
- Relatives: H. L. Hunt (grandfather); Clark Hunt (half-brother)

Lamar Hunt Jr. (born October 20, 1956) is an American businessman and a scion of the wealthy Hunt family. Hunt is president and owner of the Kansas City Mavericks professional ice hockey team. He is the son of Lamar Hunt and grandson of oil tycoon H. L. Hunt.

== Early life and education ==
Lamar Hunt Jr. was born to Lamar and Rose Mary Whittle Hunt on October 20, 1956. He grew up in Dallas, Texas, where he spent the first 11 years of his life. Lamar and Rose Mary Hunt separated when Lamar Hunt Jr. was five years old and divorced In the summer of 1963. His childhood was spent between both parents, his father and his father's new wife, Norma Knobel, whom he married in 1964 and his mother and her new husband, a Texas businessman named John David Carr.

Hunt attended private school at St. Mark's School of Texas, an all-boys school located in North Dallas. After graduating from high school, Hunt attended the University of Cincinnati College-Conservatory of Music (UCCCM). He received a Master of Arts in Counseling in May 2003 from Dallas Baptist University.

== Music career ==
While in high school, Hunt studied with David Vornholt, a flutist from the Dallas Symphony. After graduating from the University of Cincinnati College-Conservatory of Music in 1979, Hunt attended Duquesne University, where he received a masters degree in music. He then auditioned for the Kansas City Symphony and became second flute in the orchestra. He also recorded an album at St. James Catholic Church in Liberty, MO of Bach's flute sonatas in 1990.

== Professional career ==
Hunt runs four organizations (one non-profit and three commercial), all under the Loretto name.

The Loretto Foundation is a Catholic-education-focused charitable organization.

Loretto Commercial works to develop commercial projects in Kansas City.

Loretto Sports Ventures is closely tied to the Kansas City Mavericks ECHL hockey franchise. Loretto Sports Ventures also purchased the Topeka RoadRunners, a junior hockey team, that was then renamed Topeka Pilots in 2018.

Loretto Properties is a commercial and residential real estate development company dedicated to building projects of all types.

An affiliate of Hunt's Loretto Sports Ventures, LLC purchased the Missouri Mavericks ice hockey team in January 2015, which became the Kansas City Mavericks in June 2017.

Another affiliate of Hunt's Loretto Sports Ventures, LLC also purchased the Topeka RoadRunners (of the North American Hockey League) in 2018. Hunt renamed the team the Topeka Pilots and operated in Topeka for two seasons. In February 2020, the team was moved to Kansas City and renamed the Kansas City Scouts but did not play during the 2020-21 hockey season because of the COVID-19 pandemic. In May 2021, Hunt sold the team to a group in Amarillo Texas that re-branded the franchise as the Amarillo Wranglers.

In addition to owning the Mavericks, Hunt is part of the founding and operating family of the Kansas City Chiefs NFL team.

== Personal life ==
Hunt was raised in Dallas, Texas. His first marriage, to Jocelyn, produced 7 children and ended in 2000 following his settlement of a lawsuit in which allegations were made that he sexually assaulted his wife's sister. While Hunt agreed to the settlement, Hunt characterized the behavior as consensual rather than assault. In 2003, Hunt married Rita Mae Hammerschmidt, who had two children from her prior marriage. He has nine grandchildren and resides in Kansas City.
