= Hunter L. Hunt =

American heir and businessman

- Occupation: Businessman

Hunter L. Hunt is an American businessman and heir of the wealthy Hunt family. He serves as the chairman and co-chief executive officer of Hunt Consolidated Energy.

== Life and career ==
Hunt's late paternal grandfather, H. L. Hunt, was the founder of Hunt Oil Company, and his father, Ray Lee Hunt, is the executive chairman of Hunt Consolidated. He graduated from Southern Methodist University in Dallas, Texas summa cum laude with a BA in Economics and Political Science with minors in Mathematics and business. After graduating, Hunt worked for the investment banking firm Morgan Stanley, serving in the corporate finance and commodities trading departments in New York City and London.

Hunt served as president of MeterSmart. In 1998, he started two electricity companies, Hunt Power and Sharyland Utilities. He serves as the chairman and CEO of Hunt Consolidated Energy, a holding company for the Hunt Oil Company.

From September 1999 to January 2001, he worked on George W. Bush's presidential campaign, focusing on energy, taxes, and the budget.

Hunter and his wife, Stephanie, were reported, in January, 2014, to have purchased the 73-year-old, 43,000-square-foot Masonic Lodge in downtown Dallas to use as a hub for collaborative ventures for the city, including housing the "Urban Innovation Lab for Youth", which would serve as "an open-access space where kids can collaborate or experiment together in solving problems – a place where they can feel safe to fail, iterate and evolve their thinking."

He is married to Stephanie Erwin Hunt.
