= Norma Hunt =

American football franchise co-owner (1938–2023)

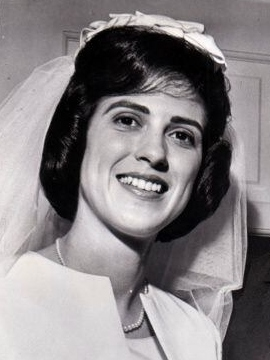
- Hunt in 1964

Personal information
- Born: March 28, 1938; Greenville, Texas, U.S.
- Died: June 4, 2023 (aged 85) near Northern Texas, U.S

Career information
- College: North Texas State

Career history
- Kansas City Chiefs (2006–2022) Minority owner

Awards and highlights
- 3× Super Bowl champion (IV, LIV, LVII)

Norma Lynn Hunt (née Knobel, March 28, 1938 – June 4, 2023) was an American football executive who was a minority owner of the Kansas City Chiefs of the National Football League (NFL) from 2006 to 2023. Hunt was married to Lamar Hunt who founded the Chiefs. At the time of her death, she was the only woman in the Never Miss a Super Bowl Club. She was known as the "First Lady of Football."

== Early life ==
Hunt was born in 1938 in Greenville, Texas, about 50 miles northeast of Dallas. She graduated from Richardson High School in the Dallas suburb of Richardson, Texas, in 1956. She played basketball and was a member of the drill team in high school.

She then earned a bachelor's degree from North Texas State University (now the University of North Texas) in 1960. She was president of the Chi Omega sorority at North Texas State. She received a Rotary Club fellowship to study in Dublin, Ireland, in 1962.

Hunt returned to Richardson High School as a teacher of American history.

== Kansas City Chiefs ownership ==
After Hunt's husband died, their children and she became the owners of the franchise with her son Clark being the ultimate authority for all personnel decisions. Her two children and two step-children each owned 24.5 percent share of the franchise while she owned the remaining 2 percent. During her time as a minority owner, the Chiefs won Super Bowl IV, Super Bowl LIV and Super Bowl LVII.

== Never Miss a Super Bowl Club ==
Prior to her death in June 2023, she was one of four members (and the only woman) in the Never Miss a Super Bowl Club. She attended the first 57 Super Bowl games from Super Bowl I (which the Chiefs lost) to Super Bowl LVII (which the Chiefs won). She attended the first 40 Super Bowls with her husband, Lamar Hunt, and continued the tradition with her sons after Lamar's death in 2006.

Hunt's connection to the Super Bowl includes inspiration for her husband's development of the game's iconic name. In 1966, Norma purchased three Super Balls for her children at a Dallas toy store. Lamar, who heard about the Super Balls with regularity from their children, despised the name of the "AFL–NFL World Championship Game" and successfully proposed that the league change the title to "Super Bowl".

The 2023 Chiefs team wore football-shaped "NKH" patches on their jerseys during the regular season and postseason to honor Hunt and had them on the team's jerseys during Super Bowl LVIII.

== Personal life ==
She met Lamar Hunt in 1963, and they were married in 1964. They had two children. Her son, Clark, is the chairman and CEO of the Kansas City Chiefs. Her granddaughter, Gracie, won the Miss Kansas USA pageant in 2021 and finished in the top 16 in that year's Miss USA.

Hunt also shared a love of soccer with her husband. She reportedly "played a huge role" in her husband's investment in the North American Soccer League. The two began to love soccer when she brought him to a Shamrock Rovers game in Dublin as a part of her Rotary Club fellowship in 1962.

Hunt was passionate about viniculture and founded the Bidwell Creek Vineyard in 2000. Her vineyard released a cabernet sauvignon under the name "Perfect Season".

Hunt died on June 4, 2023, at age 85.
