= Houston City Magazine =

Houston City Magazine was launched in 1977 as In Houston City News Monthly and was published for 10 years. Founded by R. D. (Dave) Walker, publisher and editor, and aided by key team members Ali Khan, Curtis Lang, and Jan Vanschuyver Walker, the first issue of 116 pages was successfully launched with a 300,000 direct mail charter subscription offer that pulled a response rate of double the industry standard of 2%. The original name was chosen because a d/b/a had already been formed under the name Houston City Magazine by David Crossley and Tom Curtis (although they had not actually published a magazine by this title). A 51% interest in the magazine was purchased by "Texas Parade" in 1978, and upon the hiring of Crossley and Curtis it was subsequently re-titled Houston City Magazine. The magazine was purchased by Francois de Menil in 1979. In 1982 it was purchased by Southwest Media Corporation of Texas, owned by Ray Lee Hunt of Dallas. Southwest Media also owned D Magazine of Dallas, Texas Homes and Sport Magazine. In 1987, during a major downturn in Houston's economy, the magazine was sold to Texas Monthly, who then killed one of their two major competitors (the other being "D Magazine" in Dallas). The prints and negatives associated with articles published in Houston City Magazine from 1978 to 1986 are now part of the Briscoe Center for American History at the University of Texas in Austin.
