= Charles Ansbacher =

American conductor

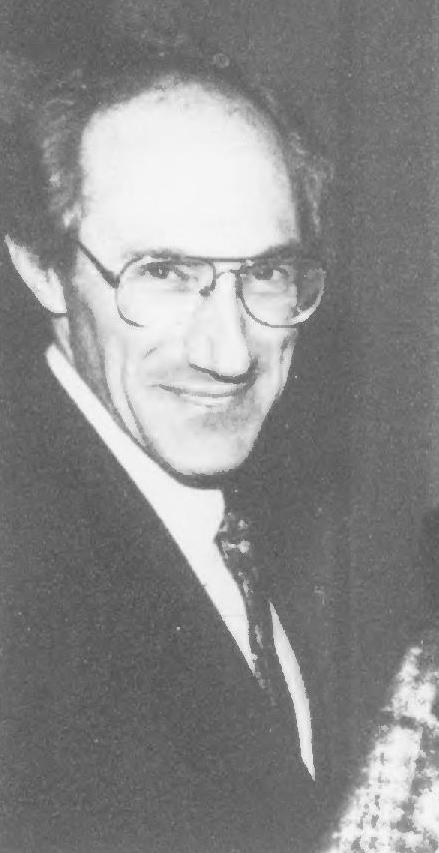
- Ansbacher at an Amerika Haus event in 1996
- Born: October 5, 1942; Providence, Rhode Island, U.S.
- Died: September 12, 2010 (aged 67); Cambridge, Massachusetts, U.S.
- Education: Brown University; University of Cincinnati
- Occupation: Conductor
- Organization(s): Colorado Springs Symphony Orchestra; Boston Landmarks Orchestra
- Spouse: Swanee Hunt (m. 1985)
- Children: 3
- Father: Heinz Ansbacher

Charles Ansbacher (October 5, 1942 – September 12, 2010) was an American conductor. After undergraduate and graduate work at Brown University ('65) and the University of Cincinnati (M.M. 1968, D.M.A. 1979), he studied conducting at the Mozarteum in Salzburg, Austria. Ansbacher was the conductor and musical director of the Colorado Springs Symphony Orchestra from 1970 to 1989, and, in 2000, founded the Boston Landmarks Orchestra, which gives free classical music concerts at various locations in the Boston area. On September 1, 2010, he was named Conductor Laureate of the Boston Landmarks Orchestra.

== Biography ==
=== Early life and education ===
Charles Ansbacher was born on October 5, 1942, in Providence, Rhode Island, to renowned Adlerian psychologists Heinz Ansbacher and Rowena Ripin Ansbacher. Ansbacher took up cello as a boy and began by conducting a Mahler piece with his high school orchestra in Burlington, Vermont. His parents encouraged his study by sending him to Greenwood Music Camp and Tanglewood.

He majored in physics at Brown University but switched to music after creating a successful chamber orchestra with his classmates. He earned his master's degree in orchestral conducting from the University of Cincinnati in 1968, followed by his D.M.A. in 1979.

=== Career ===
As a young man, Charles Ansbacher devoted almost twenty years to building the Colorado Springs Symphony, which named him Conductor Laureate when he stepped down in 1989. He was known throughout the Rocky Mountain region not only for his regular concert season, but also the music he brought to hundreds of thousands of diverse families through often-televised, innovative outdoor concerts, and the Christmas Pops on Ice that featured Olympic figure skating stars.

Ansbacher held titled positions with orchestras in Boston, Moscow, Bishkek, and Sarajevo. Among his acclaimed performances were an all-Brahms program at Harvard University's Sanders Theater, Beethoven's Ninth Symphony with the Tanglewood Festival Chorus, and the same work in Belgrade with American and Russian soloists. In 2008, he was the first American conductor to appear with the Lebanese National Symphony Orchestra. The performance was received so well that he was invited to return to the podium in 2009. He also conducted the first-ever symphony orchestra concert in Boston's historic Fenway Park, and in Hanoi as the first American ever to lead the Vietnamese National Symphony Orchestra. His primary relationship was with the Boston Landmarks Orchestra, which he created in 2000 as a gift to his home community. He led the orchestra at Boston's historic Hatch Shell on the Charles River Esplanade, and at other locations throughout Boston during the summer.

In the mid-nineties, while residing in Vienna, Ansbacher led multiple performances of renowned Austrian ensembles, including the Vienna State Opera, the Vienna Chamber Orchestra, and the Innsbruck Philharmonic. He also conducted the Sarajevo Philharmonic in performances throughout Austria, including at the famed Salzburg Grosse Festspielhaus, and Vienna's City Hall. He conducted major orchestras in Canada, Colombia, Israel, Ecuador, Italy, Lithuania, South Africa, South Korea, Vietnam, and of course the United States; however, his main thrust as an orchestra leader had been to perform in nations undergoing political transition, such as Azerbaijan, Belarus, Bosnia, Bulgaria, Croatia, the Czech Republic, Hungary, Kazakhstan, Kyrgyzstan, Lebanon, Macedonia, Moldova, Poland, Romania, Slovakia, Slovenia, Tajikistan, Ukraine, and Uzbekistan. Ansbacher organized cross-cultural exchanges, such as bringing the Sarajevo Philharmonic to Italy and Austria; leading members of the Chicago Symphony Orchestra in their famed Symphony Hall featuring Croatian pianist, Ivo Pogorelich, to celebrate the opening of the Croatian consulate; conducting the world premiere of the Mandela Portrait in Johannesburg, South Africa, then bringing the piece to the United States in 2004; and conducting the Jerusalem Symphony with a Palestinian soloist, Saleem Abboud-Ashkar in December 2005. Honoring his efforts to bridge international communities, President Bill Clinton once called Ansbacher “the unofficial ambassador of America’s music.”

Building upon multiple concerts with the Moscow Symphony Orchestra in that city's Tchaikovsky Hall, as well as the Great Hall of the Moscow Conservatory, Ansbacher conducted the MSO on nine CD's. The Landmarks Orchestra annually incubates a new work for children, and six of these are available on MSO CD's: Make Way for Ducklings, The Midnight Ride of Paul Revere, The Journey of Phillis Wheatley, Lifting the Curse: The Story of the Red Sox, David and Old Ironsides, and John Adams: the Voice Heard 'Round the World. For adults, Ansbacher led the MSO recording Beethoven Piano Concerto No. 4 and Symphony No. 4, as well as Landmarks Overtures, Dolce, and his most recent release, the double-CD Heroic Beethoven.

=== Other ventures ===
Beyond music, Charles Ansbacher applied art to public policy-making when, as a White House Fellow, he was co-chair of the U.S. Department of Transportation's Task Force on the Use of Design, Art, and Architecture in Transportation. His interest in design and architecture led to his appointment by Mayor Federico Pena to the Blue Ribbon Committee for the design of the new Denver International Airport. He stayed in the policy realm as chair of the Colorado Council on the Arts and Humanities, appointed by Governor Roy Romer. Soon after moving to Massachusetts, he accepted a one-year appointment as a visiting scholar in the Harvard Music Department (1998–1999). As he had throughout his career, Ansbacher served on the board of numerous community-focused, non-profit organizations.

== Personal life ==
In 1985, he married Swanee Hunt (the US ambassador in Vienna from 1993 to 1997). He brought his teenage son and later Oscar- and Emmy-nominated filmmaker Henry into the marriage, she Lillian, born in 1982. Together, they had another son, Theodore Ansbacher-Hunt, and three grandchildren (by Henry).

He died on September 12, 2010, in Cambridge, Massachusetts.

== Honors and awards ==
In 2009, Ansbacher was honored by the City of Cambridge, MA, and the U.S. Embassy in Beirut, Lebanon for his civic and artistic contributions in the United States and around the world. In February 2010, the National Theater of Sarajevo unveiled a plaque to thank him for his artistic leadership in the city, which began immediately after the siege in 1994 and continues today. In March 2010, the Mayor of Denver and the Governor of Colorado dedicated Charles Ansbacher Hall: the Art of Colorado at Denver International Airport, as a tribute to his leadership on the New World Airport Commission. In addition, Governor Bill Ritter declared March 15, 2010, to be "Charles Ansbacher Day" in the State of Colorado. On July 7, 2010, as Ansbacher led the Boston Landmarks Orchestra in Fenway Park's first full-length orchestral concert, Massachusetts Governor Deval Patrick presented him with a plaque that reads:

Maestro Charles Ansbacher
visionary founder
Boston Landmarks Orchestra
Free for All Concert Fund
ensuring classical music for all
2010

The plaque will be mounted on a bench on the Esplanade.
