= Swanee Hunt =

American diplomat (born 1950)

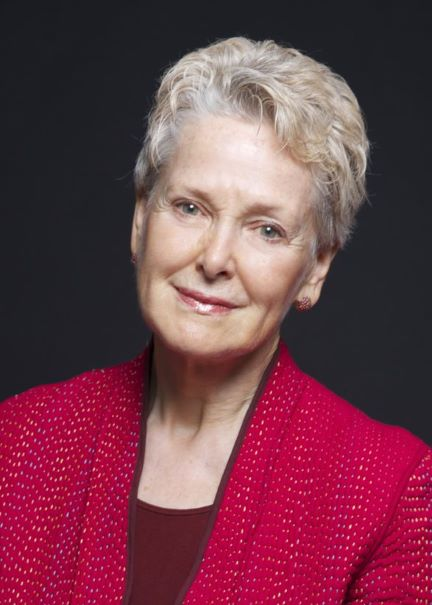
- Hunt in 2021

United States Ambassador to Austria
- In office November 4, 1993 – October 18, 1997
- President: Bill Clinton
- Preceded by: Roy M. Huffington
- Succeeded by: Kathryn Walt Hall

Personal details
- Born: May 1, 1950 (age 76)
- Party: Democratic Party
- Spouse: Charles Ansbacher
- Relations: Helen LaKelly Hunt (sister); June Hunt (sister); Ray Lee (brother)
- Children: Three
- Parent: H. L. Hunt (father)
- Education: Texas Christian University (BA); Ball State University (MA); Iliff School of Theology (MA, D.Th.)
- Occupation: Diplomat, professor
- Website: www.swaneehunt.org

Swanee Grace Hunt (born May 1, 1950) is an American writer, academic, philanthropist, and former diplomat.

Hunt is a lecturer in public policy at Harvard Kennedy School and was the founding director of the Women and Public Policy Program at the Kennedy School. From 1993 to 1997, she served as United States Ambassador to Austria. She is a recipient of the PEN/New England Award for non-fiction.

== Early life ==
Hunt was born May 1, 1950, in Dallas, Texas, the youngest of four children born to the oil tycoon H.L. Hunt and Ruth Ray. However, not until her father's first wife died did Swanee Hunt's parents marry in 1957 and it was only then that she and her siblings moved into the Hunt mansion, built to resemble its namesake, Mount Vernon.

Hunt grew up in Dallas, Texas, where she attended the Hockaday School. She lived for many years in Denver, Colorado, where she was active in many community and philanthropic activities. Her several siblings include sisters Helen LaKelly Hunt and June Hunt.

== Education ==
While Hunt had hoped to attend college in the east, her ultra-conservative father refused, so Hunt began college in her hometown at Southern Methodist University. Hunt earned her BA in philosophy from Texas Christian University, an MA in psychology from Ball State University, and an MA in religion and a doctorate in theology from Iliff School of Theology.

== Career ==
Hunt was appointed in 1993 as ambassador to Austria, where she was notable for writing a weekly newspaper column and radio program.

In 1997, Hunt helped establish the Women and Public Policy Program at Harvard Kennedy School. Since stepping down as Director of the Program in 2008, she has continued on at the Kennedy School as the Eleanor Roosevelt Lecturer in Public Policy.

== Personal life ==
At age 20, Hunt married Mark Meeks, a seminary student. Hunt gave birth to a daughter in 1982, and the marriage dissolved soon after. In 1985, Hunt married conductor Charles Ansbacher, who died on September 12, 2010. She has three children.

== Books ==
Her book This Was Not Our War: Bosnian Women Reclaiming the Peace won the 2005 PEN/New England Award for non-fiction and includes a foreword by former president Bill Clinton.

- This Was Not Our War. Duke University Press. 2001. ISBN 978-0-8223-3355-5.
- Half-Life of a Zealot. Duke University Press. 2006. ISBN 978-0-8223-3875-8. "Swanee Hunt."
- Worlds Apart: Bosnian Lessons for Global Security. Duke University Press. 2011. ISBN 978-0-8223-4975-4. "Swanee Hunt."
- Rwandan Women Rising. Duke University Press. 2017. ISBN 978-0-8223-6257-9.

Diplomatic posts
Preceded by Roy M. Huffington	U.S. Ambassador to Austria; 1993–1997	Succeeded by Kathryn Walt Hall
