= Lamar Hunt =

American businessman (1932–2006)

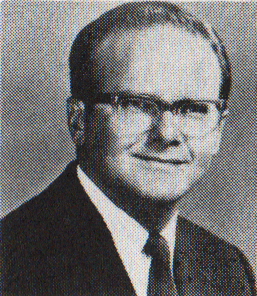
- Hunt circa 1975

Personal information
- Born: August 2, 1932; El Dorado, Arkansas, U.S.
- Died: December 13, 2006 (aged 74); Dallas, Texas, U.S.

Career information
- High school: The Hill (Pottstown, Pennsylvania)
- College: SMU

Career history
- Dallas Texans / Kansas City Chiefs (1960–2006) Owner

Awards and highlights
- Super Bowl champion (IV); AFL champion (1962); SMU Mustangs Jersey No. 80 honored; Lamar Hunt Trophy named for him; Kansas City Chiefs Hall of Fame
- Pro Football Hall of Fame

Lamar Hunt Sr. (August 2, 1932 – December 13, 2006) was an American businessman and prominent member of the Hunt family. As a sports executive, he was involved in promoting football, soccer, and tennis in the United States. With his brothers, he also attempted to corner the silver market.

Lamar Hunt was the principal founder of the American Football League (AFL) and Major League Soccer (MLS), as well as MLS's predecessor, the North American Soccer League (NASL), and co-founder of World Championship Tennis. He was also the founder and owner of the Kansas City Chiefs of the National Football League (NFL), the Kansas City Wizards of MLS, and at the time of his death owned two other MLS teams, Columbus Crew and FC Dallas. In Kansas City, Hunt also helped establish the Worlds of Fun and Oceans of Fun theme parks.

The oldest ongoing national soccer tournament in the United States, the U.S. Open Cup (founded 1914), now bears his name in honor of his pioneering role in that sport stateside. Hunt was inducted into the Pro Football Hall of Fame in 1972; into the National Soccer Hall of Fame in 1982; and into the International Tennis Hall of Fame in 1993 for his contribution to the birth of professional Open Era tennis.

The National Soccer Hall of Fame bestowed upon Hunt their Medal of Honor in 1999, an award given to only three recipients in history thus far. He was married for 42 years to his second wife Norma, and had four children, Sharron, Lamar Jr., Daniel, and Clark Hunt.

== Biography ==
=== Early life ===
Hunt was born in El Dorado, Arkansas, US, on August 2, 1932. He was the son of oil tycoon H. L. Hunt and younger brother of tycoons Nelson Bunker Hunt and William Herbert Hunt. Lamar was raised in Dallas, Texas. He attended Culver Military Academy and graduated from The Hill School in Pennsylvania in 1951 and Southern Methodist University in Dallas in 1956, with a B.S. degree in geology. Hunt was a college football player who rode the bench but was still an avid sports enthusiast during his time in college and throughout his entire childhood. While attending SMU in 1952, Hunt joined the Kappa Sigma fraternity. In 1972, he was selected as Kappa Sigma's Man of the Year.

=== Founding of the American Football League ===
On the strength of his great inherited oil wealth, Hunt applied for a National Football League expansion franchise but was turned down. In 1959, professional American football was a distant second to Major League Baseball in popularity, and the thinking among NFL executives was that the league must be careful not to "oversaturate" the market by expanding too quickly. Hunt also attempted to purchase the NFL's Chicago Cardinals (now based in Arizona) franchise in 1959 with the intention to move them to Dallas, but was again turned down (the team moved to St. Louis, Missouri in 1960).

In response, Hunt approached several other businessmen who had also unsuccessfully sought NFL franchises, including fellow Texan and oilman Bud Adams of Houston, about forming a new football league, and the American Football League was established in August 1959. The group of the eight founders of the AFL teams was referred to as the "Foolish Club". Hunt's goal was to bring professional football to Texas and to acquire an NFL team for the Hunt family. Hunt became an owner of the Dallas Texans and hired future hall-of-Famer Hank Stram as the team's first head coach. The team, along with the AFL, began play in 1960.

=== Ownership and NFL merger ===
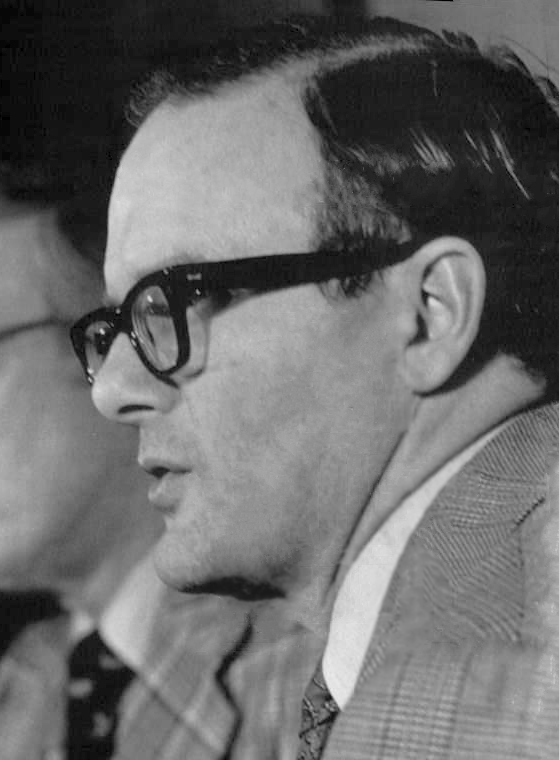
Hunt in 1974

As a response to the newly formed league and the presence of an AFL franchise in Dallas, the NFL quickly placed a new franchise of their own in Dallas, the Dallas Cowboys, who also began play in 1960. As a result, the Dallas Texans, despite being one of the more successful AFL teams in the league's early days, had little luck at the gate, as they had to compete with the Cowboys for fans.

By the end of the 1962 season, Hunt concluded that Dallas was not big enough to support two teams, and began to consider moving the team. Kansas City became one of the contenders, as Hunt wanted a city to which he could easily commute from Dallas. To convince Hunt to move the team to Kansas City, mayor H. Roe Bartle promised Hunt home attendance of 25,000 people per game: Hunt finally agreed to move the team to Kansas City, and in 1963 the Dallas Texans were rebranded the Kansas City Chiefs.

While the Chiefs' first two seasons had attendance not matching the levels Mayor Bartle had promised, in 1966 average home attendance at Chiefs games increased and reached 37,000. By 1969, Chiefs' average home attendance had reached 51,000. In 1966, the Chiefs won their first AFL Championship (after having previously won it in 1962 as the Dallas Texans) and reached the first-ever Super Bowl, which the Chiefs lost to the Green Bay Packers. The Chiefs remained successful through the 1960s, and in 1970 the Chiefs won the AFL Championship and Super Bowl IV (the last Super Bowl played when the AFL was a separate league, prior to it being absorbed into the NFL as the American Football Conference) over the heavily favored Minnesota Vikings.

Hunt insisted that he be listed in team media guides as the founder of the Chiefs rather than the owner, and publicly listed his telephone number in the phone book for the rest of his life. From 1960 to 2005, the Chiefs reached the postseason fourteen times with Hunt as founder, with nine coming after 1971. The Chiefs reached the AFC Championship Game to compete for the trophy named in 1984 after Hunt on one occasion during his lifetime, losing in 1993.

=== Coinage of the term "Super Bowl" ===
In 1966, the NFL and AFL agreed to merge, with a championship game between the two leagues to be played after that season. In a July 25, 1966, letter to NFL commissioner Pete Rozelle, Hunt wrote, "I have kiddingly called it the 'Super Bowl,' which obviously can be improved upon." Hunt would later say the name was likely in his head because his children had been playing with a Super Ball toy. Although the leagues' owners decided on the name "AFL-NFL Championship Game", the media immediately picked up on Hunt's "Super Bowl" name, which would become official beginning with the third annual game in 1969, which was won by the AFL's New York Jets over the NFL's Baltimore Colts.

=== The NASL: ownership and battles with the NFL ===
In 1967 Hunt helped promote professional soccer in the United States. Hunt's interest in soccer began in 1962 when he accompanied his future wife, Norma, to a Shamrock Rovers game in Dublin, Ireland. In 1966, he viewed the FIFA World Cup in England, and then attended nine of the next 11 World Cup tournaments.

In 1967, Hunt founded the Dallas Tornado as members of the United Soccer Association. In 1968 the league merged with the National Professional Soccer League to form the North American Soccer League. Hunt was an active advocate for the sport and the league and the Dallas Tornado won the NASL championship in 1971 and were runners-up in 1973.

The NFL owners were not happy with Hunt's ownership in and promotion of pro soccer. The NFL attempted to force legal requirements that would disallow team ownership in more than one sport for owners of NFL franchises. This strategy backfired on the NFL, and the NASL won an anti-trust case against the NFL. A primary benefactor of this outcome was Lamar Hunt.

In 1981, after 15 seasons and losses in the millions, Hunt and his Dallas Tornado partner Bill McNutt decided to merge their team with the Tampa Bay Rowdies franchise, while retaining a minority stake in the Florida club. Two years later, along with Rowdies principal George Strawbrige, they sold the Rowdies to local investors. The move effectively ended Hunt's ties to the NASL a year before the league itself finally collapsed in 1984.

=== Major League Soccer ===
Hunt returned to soccer as one of the original founding investors of Major League Soccer, which debuted in 1996. He originally owned two teams: the Columbus Crew and the Kansas City Wizards (now Sporting Kansas City). In 1999, Hunt financed the construction of the venue now known as Historic Crew Stadium, the second, and first since 1913, of several large soccer-specific stadiums in the USA. In 2003, Hunt purchased a third team, the Dallas Burn (now FC Dallas), after announcing that he would partially finance the construction of their own soccer-specific stadium. On August 31, 2006, Hunt sold the Wizards to a six-man ownership group led by Cerner Corporation co-founders Neal Patterson and Cliff Illig.

=== Tennis ===
In 1968, Hunt co-founded the World Championship Tennis circuit, which gave birth to the Open Era of tennis. He was inducted into the International Tennis Hall of Fame in 1993.

== Business ventures outside sports ==
=== Amusement parks and caves ===
Hunt was the founder of two theme parks in Kansas City: Worlds of Fun and Oceans of Fun, which opened in 1973 and 1982 respectively. The two parks were an outgrowth and adjoined a vast industrial park he developed in the bluffs above the Missouri River in Clay County, Missouri.

Immediately south of the Hunt-founded parks is the Hunt-developed SubTropolis, a 55 million-square-foot (5.06 million m^{2}), 1,100-acre (450 ha) manmade limestone cave which is claimed to be the "World's Largest Underground Business Complex". Hunt's extensive business dealings in Clay County contributed to the Chiefs having their NFL Training Camp at William Jewell College in Liberty, Missouri until 1991.

=== Hunt Brothers Silver speculation ===
During the 1970s and early 1980s, Hunt and his brothers Nelson Bunker Hunt and William Herbert Hunt attempted to corner the silver market. They began buying silver in the early 1970s. By the end of 1979, their ownership of one-third of the world silver market caused the price to rise from $11 an ounce in September 1979 to $50 an ounce in January 1980. In the last nine months of 1979, the brothers profited by an estimated $2 billion to $4 billion. However, on March 27, 1980, subsequently referred to within the precious-metals industry as Silver Thursday, the price collapsed. In September 1988, the Hunt brothers filed for bankruptcy under the United States Bankruptcy Code Chapter 11.

== Personal life ==
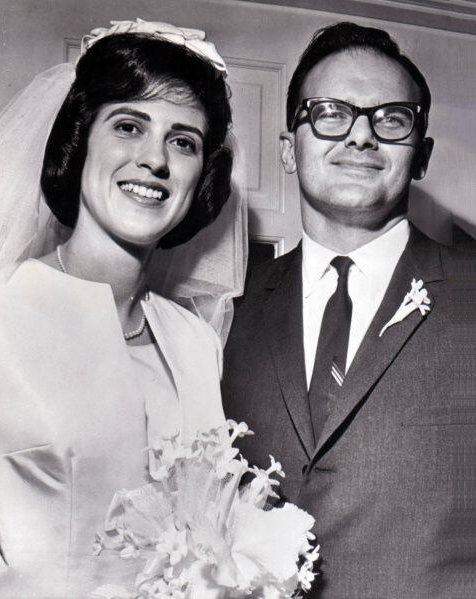
Norma and Lamar Hunt getting married in Texas on January 22, 1964

Hunt had three brothers, Haroldson Lafayette Hunt III, Nelson Bunker and William Herbert. His half-sister Swanee Hunt was Ambassador to Austria.

Married twice, Hunt first married Rosemary Carr. The pair met in Dallas as teenagers, went to Southern Methodist University together and married in 1956. Together they had two children Lamar Jr. and Sharron Hunt. The pair divorced in 1962, due in part to Hunt's travel schedule.

In 1964, he married his second wife Norma, who was a schoolteacher and hostess for the Dallas Texans, to whom he remained married until his death. They had two sons, Clark and Daniel. Norma Hunt was one of the few people and the only woman to attend every Super Bowl, from 1967 until her death in June 2023.

Hunt was close friends and neighbors with Cowboys owner Jerry Jones, whom Hunt met when he was 25 years old. The two lived in an upscale neighborhood in Dallas. In 1998, Hunt commissioned the Preston Road Trophy to be awarded to the winner of games between the Chiefs and Cowboys; when the trophy changed hands, Hunt and Jones often performed pranks on each other.

== Death and succession ==
Hunt died December 13, 2006, at Presbyterian Hospital in Dallas of complications related to prostate cancer, having been hospitalized for weeks. He was 74 years old. Upon his death, Jones called Hunt "a founder of the NFL as we know it today," adding "He's been an inspiration for me." Said Dan Rooney, chairman of the Pittsburgh Steelers: "Lamar Hunt was one of the most influential owners in professional football over the past 40-plus years, He was instrumental in the formation of the American Football League and in the AFL-NFL merger, which helped the National Football League grow into America's passion." The mayor of Kansas City, Missouri, Kay Waldo Barnes, requested that all city flags fly at half-staff the following Thursday and Friday after Hunt's death.

Upon Hunt's death, his son Clark was named the chairman of the Kansas City Chiefs and FC Dallas, having been elected by Hunt's other children, Lamar Hunt Jr., Sharron Munson, and Daniel Hunt. Though Hunt's wife and children shared legal ownership of the Chiefs, Clark represents the team at all league owner meetings and handles the day-to-day responsibilities of the team.

== See also ==
- Other American Football League players, coaches, and contributors
- Lamar Hunt U.S. Open Cup

Sporting positions
| New creation | Dallas Texans/Kansas City Chiefs principal owner 1959–2006 | Succeeded by Clark Hunt |
