= June Hunt =

American writer and radio host

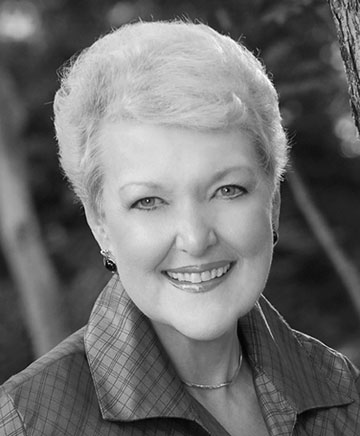
- Born: Ruth June Hunt; December 31, 1944 (age 81); Dallas, Texas, United States
- Occupations: Founder of Hope for the Heart (1986), founder of the Hope Center (2009)
- Website: http://www.hopefortheheart.org

June Hunt (born Ruth June Hunt, December 31, 1944) is the founder and chief servant officer (CSO) of Hope for the Heart, a US-based nonprofit Christian ministry which she founded in 1986. She is also an heiress of the wealthy Hunt family.

Hunt is the author of the Biblical Counseling Library, a 100-volume collection of Biblical counseling manuals. They are the foundation for HftH's international broadcasts, training, publishing, teaching and biblical counseling ministry. Hunt has two radio broadcasts - Hope in the Night, a live 2-hour call-in counseling program, and Hope for the Heart, a half-hour teaching program.

== Early years ==
Hunt was one of 14 children of oil tycoon H. L. Hunt and Ruth Ray. She has spoken of her complicated family life and her mother’s example of being a devout Christian.

She attended the Hockaday School in Dallas and became a committed Christian at age 15. She then graduated from Southern Methodist University in 1966 with a Bachelor of Music degree, and later earned a Master of Arts degree in Counseling from Criswell College.

At this time she was singing full-time. She toured overseas with the USO and was a guest soloist with the Billy Graham Crusades.

== Career ==
Hunt initially worked as Junior High Division Director, and later as College & Career Director, at First Baptist Church in Dallas, Texas, overseeing the spiritual formation of 1,200 members combined. As a part of this role, she created a curriculum for a multi-year Bible survey course.

At this time she realized how limited the selection of Christian resources was on subjects like childhood sexual abuse and domestic violence. She started a radio show to discuss these subjects with ‘biblical hope and practical help’. She went on to create Hope for the Heart in 1986.

Between 1989 and 1992, she developed and taught Counseling Through The Bible, a scripturally-based counseling course, which addressed 100 topics in categories such as marriage and family, rocky relationships, emotional entrapments, Christian apologetics, as well as addictions and abuse. Since then, the coursework has been refined to form the basis for the Biblical Counseling Library, composed of 100 topical training manuals, each called Biblical Counseling Keys.

During this time, Hunt also appeared as a guest on numerous national TV and radio programs, including NBC's Today Show.

== Hope for the Heart ==
Hope for the Heart's Biblical Counseling Library provides a foundation for Hunt's two daily radio programs, Hope for the Heart and Hope in the Night. The Counseling Library also created the Hope Biblical Counseling Institute (BCI) in 2002., initiated by Criswell College.

HftH sponsors walk-in counseling centers in several countries. In Canada, the ministry aired a Chinese language version of HOPE's radio briefs, Moment of Hope, and sponsors a call center through which Chinese-speaking listeners receive biblical counsel.

In 2008, Hope for the Heart created a new Chair of Biblical Counseling at Criswell College. The Biblical Counseling Library is required curriculum for counseling students enrolled in this program.

== Later works ==
Hunt is the founder and CEO of The Hope Center in Plano, Texas, a permanent home for nearly 65 nonprofit Christian ministries that share space under one roof. Hope for the Heart is the Center's anchor tenant

Hunt has been a regular guest professor at colleges and seminaries. She trains peers annually at the American Association of Christian Counselors conference and speaks at numerous other national and international conferences, as well as religious and broadcasting events each year on topics such as forgiveness, anger, fear, childhood sexual abuse, and domestic violence.

In 2011, her article "Beyond Cancer: A Survivor’s Story”, appeared in the Vol. 18 No. 1 issue of the American Association of Christian Counseling magazine Christian Counseling Today.

== Awards and honors ==
=== National Religious Broadcasters (NRB) ===
- 1986: Hope for the Heart radio broadcast, Genesis Award, "Best New Radio Program"
- 1989: Hope for the Heart radio broadcast, "Radio Program of the Year"
- 2010: Hope for the Heart ministry, "Media Award for International Strategic Partnerships”
- 2011: June Hunt, "board of directors Award”
- 2012: Hope for the Heart ministry, "Radio Impact Award”
- 2021: Hall of Fame Award winner

=== Others ===
- 1991: June Hunt, honorary Doctor of Law degree, Criswell College
- 1993: June Hunt, honorary Doctorate in Literature, Dallas Baptist University
- 2002: Selected Biblical Counseling Keys, translated into Russian, "Best Inspirational Book of the Year"
- 2008: June Hunt, "Excellence in Communications Award," Women in Christian Media
- 2008: June Hunt, "Reintegration Award", Eli Lilly
- 2011: June Hunt, "Caregiver Award", American Association of Christian Counselors
- 2012: Advanced Writers & Speakers Association, "Golden Scroll Lifetime Achievement Award"

== Selected works ==
=== Trade books ===
- Aging Well: Living Long, Finishing Strong, ISBN 978-1628621419
- The Answer to Anger, Practical Steps to Temper Fiery Emotions, ISBN 978-0736949309
- The Biblical Counseling Reference Guide: Over 580 Real-Life Topics, More than 11,000 Relevant Verses, ISBN 978-0736923309
- Bonding with Your Child through Boundaries, ISBN 978-1433543340
- Bonding with Your Teen through Boundaries, ISBN 978-1-4335-1620-7
- Boundaries: How to Set Them-How to Keep Them, ISBN 978-1628621792
- Bullying: Bully No More, ISBN 978-1596369269
- Caregiving: a Privilege, Not a Prison, ISBN 978-1628621518
- Caring for a Loved One with Cancer, ISBN 978-1-4335-2707-4
- Counseling Through Your Bible Handbook, ISBN 978-0-7369-2181-7
- Dealing with Anger Bible Study, ISBN 978-1628623871
- Envy & Jealousy: Taming the Terrible Twins, ISBN 978-1628621846
- Finding Self-Worth Bible Study, ISBN 978-1628623994
- Handling Stress Bible Study, ISBN 978-1628623963
- Hope For Your Heart: Finding Strength in Life’s Storms, ISBN 978-1-4335-0397-9
- How to Defeat Harmful Habits: Freedom from Six Addictive Behaviors, ISBN 978-0-7369-2329-3
- How to Deal with Difficult Relationships: Bridging the Gaps That Separate People, ISBN 978-0-7369-2816-8
- How to Forgive ... When You Don't Feel Like It, ISBN 978-0-7369-2148-0
- How to Handle Your Emotions, ISBN 978-0-7369-2328-6
- How to Rise Above Abuse, ISBN 978-0-7369-2333-0
- Keeping Your Cool … When Your Anger Is Hot!, ISBN 978-0-7369-2424-5
- Men's Trail Guide, ISBN 978-1-9317-3463-9
- Overcoming Depression Bible Study, ISBN 978-1628623901
- Seeing Yourself Through God's Eyes, ISBN 978-0-7369-2425-2
- Understanding Verbal & Emotional Abuse Bible Study, ISBN 978-1628623932

=== Music CDs ===
- Songs of Surrender
- Hymns of Hope
- The Whisper of My Heart
- The Shelter Under His Wings
- The Hope of Christmas
