= Margaret Hunt Hill =

American philanthropist and heiress (1915–2007)

- Born: Margaret Hunt; October 19, 1915; Lake Village, Arkansas, U.S.
- Died: June 14, 2007 (aged 91); Dallas, Texas, U.S.
- Education: Mary Baldwin College
- Occupation: Philanthropist
- Spouse: Albert Galatyn Hill Sr.
- Children: 3, including Lyda Hill
- Parents: H. L. Hunt (father); Lyda Bunker (mother)
- Family: Hunt

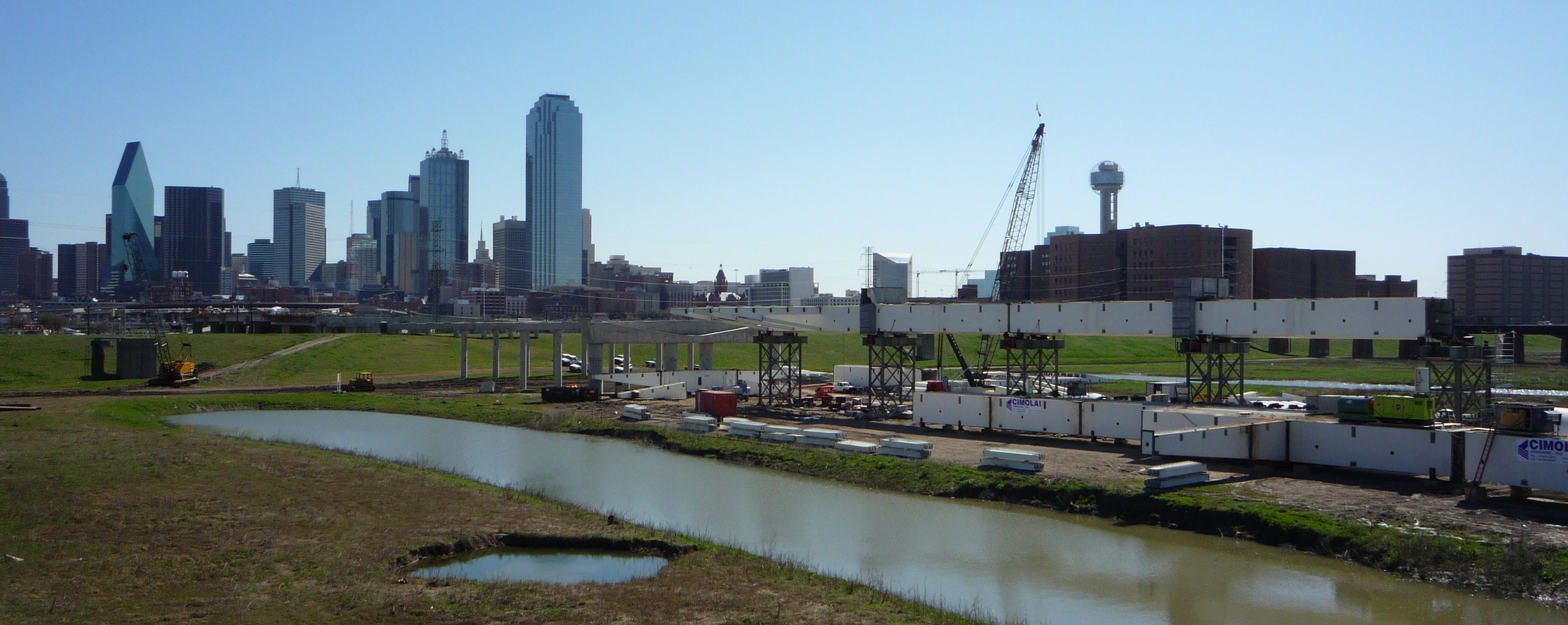
Margaret Hunt Hill Bridge construction on March 12, 2010

Margaret Hunt Hill (October 19, 1915 – June 14, 2007) was an American philanthropist and heiress of the wealthy Hunt family.

== Family, early life, and education ==
On October 19, 1915, Hill was born as Margaret Hunt in Lake Village, Arkansas. Hill's father was H. L. Hunt (1889–1974) and her mother was Lyda Bunker (1889–1955), both members of the Hunt family.

Hill grew up in El Dorado, Arkansas and Tyler, Texas, and moved to Dallas, Texas in 1938. She graduated from Mary Baldwin College, a private women's college in Staunton, Virginia.

== Career ==
Hill worked as an assistant for her father until she got married. Together with her husband, she built two luxury resorts in Colorado Springs, Colorado: the Garden of the Gods Club and the Kissing Camels Club. She also landscaped the Falcon Stadium of the United States Air Force Academy in 1962.

== Philanthropy ==
She served as a Treasurer of the Dallas Junior League, President of the Dallas Women's Club, as well as Chairman of the Dallas Easter Seals and the Dallas Society for Crippled Children.

She founded the Dallas County Heritage Society, where she served as a Director throughout her life. She also served as Vice President of the Dallas Historical Society. From 1981 to 1987, she served on the Governor's Texas Historical Society, and from 1981 to 1988, as a Treasurer of the Friends of the Governor's Mansion. Together with Van Cliburn (1934–2013), she served as co-Chairman of the 60th Anniversary of the Discovery of the East Texas Oil Field. The ceremony was held at the East Texas Oil Field Museum, which she helped create.

She sat on the Board of Directors of the Garden Club of America. Moreover, she founded the Kissing Camels Garden Club and served as President of the Junior League Garden Club and the Founders Garden Club.

Additionally, she founded the Dallas Cotillion, an annual debutante ball in Dallas. She also served as the Queen of the Texas Rose Festival in Tyler, Texas in 1935.

In 1991, together with her sister Caroline, she paid for the restoration of Hilltop, an 1810 building on the campus of Mary Baldwin College which is listed on the National Register of Historic Places.

She was a recipient of the 1990 Flora Award, the Zone IX Creative Leadership Award from the Garden Club of America, the National Philanthropy Award from the Susan G. Komen for the Cure in 1996, the Award for Excellence from the Dallas Historical Society in 1999, the Gertrude Shelburne Award from Planned Parenthood, the Family of the Year Award from the YWCA in 2000, and an honorary degree from her alma mater, Mary Baldwin College.

== Personal life and death ==
Hill was married to Albert Galatyn Hill Sr. (1904–1988). They had three children:

- Lyda Hill (born 1942).
- Alinda Wikert
- Albert Galatyn Hill Jr.

Hill died on June 14, 2007, in Dallas, Texas, aged 91. Her funeral service was held at the Highland Park Presbyterian Church in Dallas, Texas.

== Legacy ==
The Margaret Hunt Hill Bridge in Dallas, designed by Santiago Calatrava, is named in her honor.
