= 101 Awards =

American football awards

The NFL 101 Awards were founded in 1969 by Lamar Hunt and Jack Wheeler to recognize the top players and coaches in professional American football. Each year the 101 Awards names six recipients: an offensive player, a defensive player, and a head coach in both the AFC and the NFC, the two conferences of the National Football League.

The 101 Awards is the nation’s longest-running awards program dedicated exclusively to the NFL. Winners are selected by a national voter based consisting of 101 sportswriters and sportscasters who cover the NFL. The awards are unique in that they honor achievement in each conference separately, rather than the NFL as a whole.

From 1969 to 2023, the awards were presented at an annual event held in Kansas City, Missouri. Beginning with the 2024 NFL season, the awards are announced annually on NFL Network.

== Offensive Player of the Year awards ==
Season	AFC			NFC		
Season	Player	Team	Position	Player	Team	Position
1969	Daryle Lamonica	Oakland Raiders	Quarterback	Roman Gabriel	Los Angeles Rams	Quarterback
1970	George Blanda	Oakland Raiders	Quarterback	John Brodie	San Francisco 49ers	Quarterback
1971	Bob Griese (1)	Miami Dolphins	Quarterback	Roger Staubach	Dallas Cowboys	Quarterback
1972	O. J. Simpson (1)	Buffalo Bills	Running back	Larry Brown	Washington Redskins	Running back
1973	O. J. Simpson (2)	Buffalo Bills	Running back	John Hadl	Los Angeles Rams	Quarterback
1974	Ken Stabler	Oakland Raiders	Quarterback	Chuck Foreman	Minnesota Vikings	Running back
1975	O. J. Simpson (3)	Buffalo Bills	Running back	Fran Tarkenton	Minnesota Vikings	Quarterback
1976	Bert Jones	Baltimore Colts	Quarterback	Walter Payton (1)	Chicago Bears	Running back
1977	Bob Griese (2)	Miami Dolphins	Quarterback	Walter Payton (2)	Chicago Bears	Running back
1978	Earl Campbell	Houston Oilers	Running back	Archie Manning	New Orleans Saints	Quarterback
1979	Dan Fouts	San Diego Chargers	Quarterback	Ottis Anderson	St. Louis Cardinals	Running back
1980	Brian Sipe	Cleveland Browns	Quarterback	Steve Bartkowski	Atlanta Falcons	Quarterback
1981	Ken Anderson	Cincinnati Bengals	Quarterback	Tony Dorsett	Dallas Cowboys	Running back
1982	No award	-	-	No award	-	-
1983	Dan Marino (1)	Miami Dolphins	Quarterback	Joe Theisman	Washington Redskins	Quarterback
1984	Dan Marino (2)	Miami Dolphins	Quarterback	Eric Dickerson	Los Angeles Rams	Running back
1985	Marcus Allen	Los Angeles Raiders	Running back	Walter Payton (3)	Chicago Bears	Running back
1986	Dan Marino (3)	Miami Dolphins	Quarterback	Jerry Rice (1)	San Francisco 49ers	Wide receiver
1987	John Elway (1)	Denver Broncos	Quarterback	Jerry Rice (2)	San Francisco 49ers	Wide receiver
1988	Boomer Esiason	Cincinnati Bengals	Quarterback	Roger Craig	San Francisco 49ers	Running back
1989	Christian Okoye	Kansas City Chiefs	Running back	Joe Montana	San Francisco 49ers	Quarterback
1990	Warren Moon	Houston Oilers	Quarterback	Randall Cunningham (1)	Philadelphia Eagles	Quarterback
1991	Thurman Thomas	Buffalo Bills	Running back	Barry Sanders (1)	Detroit Lions	Running back
1992	Barry Foster	Pittsburgh Steelers	Running back	Steve Young (1)	San Francisco 49ers	Quarterback
1993	John Elway (2)	Denver Broncos	Quarterback	Emmitt Smith	Dallas Cowboys	Running back
1994	Dan Marino (4)	Miami Dolphins	Quarterback	Steve Young (2)	San Francisco 49ers	Quarterback
1995	Jim Harbaugh	Indianapolis Colts	Quarterback	Brett Favre (1)	Green Bay Packers	Quarterback
1996	John Elway (3)	Denver Broncos	Quarterback	Brett Favre (2)	Green Bay Packers	Quarterback
1997	Terrell Davis (1)	Denver Broncos	Running back	Barry Sanders (2)	Detroit Lions	Running back
1998	Terrell Davis (2)	Denver Broncos	Running back	Randall Cunningham (2)	Minnesota Vikings	Quarterback
1999	Peyton Manning (1)	Indianapolis Colts	Quarterback	Kurt Warner (1)	St. Louis Rams	Quarterback
2000	Rich Gannon (1)	Oakland raiders	Quarterback	Marshall Faulk	St. Louis Rams	Running back
2001	Kordell Stewart	Pittsburgh Steelers	Quarterback	Kurt Warner (2)	St. Louis Rams	Quarterback
2002	Rich Gannon (2)	Oakland Raiders	Quarterback	Brett Favre (3)	Green Bay Packers	Quarterback
2003	Peyton Manning (2)	Indianapolis Colts	Quarterback	Ahman Green	Green Bay Packers	Running back
2004	Peyton Manning (3)	Indianapolis Colts	Quarterback	Donovan McNabb	Philadelphia Eagles	Quarterback
2005	Peyton Manning (4)	Indianapolis Colts	Quarterback	Shaun Alexander	Seattle Seahawks	Running back
2006	LaDainian Tomlinson	San Diego Chargers	Running back	Drew Brees (1)	New Orleans Saints	Quarterback
2007	Tom Brady (1)	New England Patriots	Quarterback	Brett Favre (4)	Green Bay Packers	Quarterback
2008	Peyton Manning (5)	Indianapolis Colts	Quarterback	Drew Brees (2)	New Orleans Saints	Quarterback
2009	Peyton Manning (6)	Indianapolis Colts	Quarterback	Drew Brees (3)	New Orleans Saints	Quarterback
2010	Tom Brady (2)	New England Patriots	Quarterback	Michael Vick	Philadelphia Eagles	Quarterback
2011	Tom Brady (3)	New England Patriots	Quarterback	Aaron Rodgers (1)	Green Bay Packers	Quarterback
2012	Peyton Manning (7)	Denver Broncos	Quarterback	Adrian Peterson	Minnesota Vikings	Running back
2013	Peyton Manning (8)	Denver Broncos	Quarterback	LeSean McCoy	Philadelphia Eagles	Running back
2014	Le'Veon Bell (tie); Antonio Brown (1) (tie)	Pittsburgh Steelers	Running back Wide receiver	Aaron Rodgers (2)	Green Bay Packers	Quarterback
2015	Tom Brady (4)	New England Patriots	Quarterback	Cam Newton	Carolina Panthers	Quarterback
2016	Tom Brady (5)	New England Patriots	Quarterback	Ezekiel Elliott	Dallas Cowboys	Quarterback
2017	Antonio Brown (2)	Pittsburgh Steelers	Wide receiver	Todd Gurley	Los Angeles Rams	Running back
2018	Patrick Mahomes	Kansas City Chiefs	Quarterback	Drew Brees (4)	New Orleans Saints	Quarterback
2019	Lamar Jackson	Baltimore Ravens	Quarterback	Michael Thomas	New Orleans Saints	Wide receiver
2020	Derrick Henry	Tennessee Titans	Running back	Aaron Rodgers (3)	Green Bay Packers	Quarterback
2021	Jonathan Taylor	Indianapolis Colts	Running back	Cooper Kupp	Los Angeles Rams	Wide receiver
2022	Patrick Mahomes (2)	Kansas City Chiefs	Quarterback	Jalen Hurts	Philadelphia Eagles	Quarterback
2023	Lamar Jackson (2)	Baltimore Ravens	Quarterback	Christian McCaffrey	San Francisco 49ers	Running back
2024	Lamar Jackson (3)	Baltimore Ravens	Quarterback	Saquon Barkley	Philadelphia Eagles	Running back
2025	Drake Maye	New England Patriots	Quarterback	Matthew Stafford	Los Angeles Rams	Quarterback

== Defensive Player of the Year awards ==
NFC Defensive Player of the Year
1969— Carl Eller, Minnesota Vikings
1970— Alan Page, Minnesota Vikings
1971— Alan Page, Minnesota Vikings
1972— Chris Hanburger, Washington Redskins
1973— Lee Roy Jordan, Dallas Cowboys
1974— Alan Page, Minnesota Vikings
1975— Jack Youngblood, Los Angeles Rams
1976— Jack Youngblood, Los Angeles Rams
1977— Harvey Martin, Dallas Cowboys
1978— Randy White, Dallas Cowboys
1979— Lee Roy Selmon, Tampa Bay Buccaneers
1980— Nolan Cromwell, Los Angeles Rams
1981— Fred Dean, San Francisco 49ers
1982— No award due to players strike
1983— Dave Butz, Washington Redskins
1984— Lawrence Taylor, New York Giants
1985— Mike Singletary, Chicago Bears
1986 —Lawrence Taylor, New York Giants
1987— Reggie White, Philadelphia Eagles
1988— Mike Singletary, Chicago Bears
1989— Keith Millard, Minnesota Vikings
1990— Charles Haley, San Francisco 49ers
1991— Pat Swilling, New Orleans Saints
1992— Wilber Marshall, Washington Redskins
1993— Deion Sanders, Atlanta Falcons
1994— Deion Sanders, San Francisco 49ers
1995— Reggie White, Green Bay Packers
1996— Kevin Greene, Carolina Panthers
1997— Dana Stubblefield, San Francisco 49ers
1998— Reggie White, Green Bay Packers
1999— Warren Sapp, Tampa Bay Buccaneers
2000— La'Roi Glover, New Orleans Saints
2001— Michael Strahan, New York Giants
2002— Derrick Brooks, Tampa Bay Buccaneers
2003— Michael Strahan, New York Giants
2004— Julius Peppers, Carolina Panthers
2005— Brian Urlacher, Chicago Bears
2006— Brian Urlacher, Chicago Bears
2007— Patrick Kerney, Seattle Seahawks
2008— DeMarcus Ware, Dallas Cowboys
2009— Charles Woodson, Green Bay Packers
2010— Clay Matthews, Green Bay Packers
2011— Jared Allen, Minnesota Vikings
2012— Aldon Smith, San Francisco 49ers
2013— Luke Kuechly, Carolina Panthers
2014— Richard Sherman, Seattle Seahawks
2015— Aaron Donald, St. Louis Rams
2016— Landon Collins, New York Giants
2017— Aaron Donald, Los Angeles Rams
2018— Aaron Donald, Los Angeles Rams
2019— Chandler Jones, Arizona Cardinals
2020— Aaron Donald, Los Angeles Rams
2021— Micah Parsons, Dallas Cowboys
2022— Nick Bosa, San Francisco 49ers
2023— Micah Parsons, Dallas Cowboys
2024— Kerby Joseph, Detroit Lions
2025— Micah Parsons, Green Bay Packers

AFC Defensive Player of the Year
1969— Bobby Bell, Kansas City Chiefs
1970— Mike Curtis, Baltimore Colts
1971— Willie Lanier, Kansas City Chiefs
1972— Joe Greene, Pittsburgh Steelers
1973— Dick Anderson, Miami Dolphins
1974— Joe Greene, Pittsburgh Steelers
1975— Mel Blount, Pittsburgh Steelers
1976— Jack Lambert, Pittsburgh Steelers
1977— Lyle Alzado, Denver Broncos
1978— Randy Gradishar, Denver Broncos
1979— Mike Reinfeldt, Houston Oilers
1980— Lester Hayes, Oakland Raiders
1981— Joe Klecko, New York Jets
1982— No award due to players strike
1983— Doug Betters, Miami Dolphins
1984— Kenny Easley, Seattle Seahawks
1985— Andre Tippett, New England Patriots
1986— Deron Cherry, Kansas City Chiefs
1987— Bruce Smith, Buffalo Bills
1988— Cornelius Bennett, Buffalo Bills
1989— Michael Dean Perry, Cleveland Browns
1990— Bruce Smith, Buffalo Bills
1991— Derrick Thomas, Kansas City Chiefs
1992— Cortez Kennedy, Seattle Seahawks
1993— Rod Woodson, Pittsburgh Steelers
1994— Greg Lloyd, Pittsburgh Steelers
1995— Bryce Paup, Buffalo Bills
1996— Bruce Smith, Buffalo Bills
1997— Carnell Lake, Pittsburgh Steelers
1998— Junior Seau, San Diego Chargers
1999— Jevon Kearse, Tennessee Titans
2000— Ray Lewis, Baltimore Ravens
2001— Ray Lewis, Baltimore Ravens
2002— Jason Taylor, Miami Dolphins
2003— Ray Lewis, Baltimore Ravens
2004— Ed Reed, Baltimore Ravens
2005— Dwight Freeney, Indianapolis Colts
2006— Jason Taylor, Miami Dolphins
2007— Bob Sanders, Indianapolis Colts
2008— James Harrison, Pittsburgh Steelers
2009— Darrelle Revis, New York Jets
2010— Troy Polamalu, Pittsburgh Steelers
2011— Terrell Suggs, Baltimore Ravens
2012— J. J. Watt, Houston Texans
2013— Robert Mathis, Indianapolis Colts
2014— J. J. Watt, Houston Texans
2015— J. J. Watt, Houston Texans
2016— Khalil Mack, Oakland Raiders
2017— Calais Campbell, Jacksonville Jaguars
2018— J. J. Watt, Houston Texans
2019— Stephon Gilmore, New England Patriots
2020— T. J. Watt, Pittsburgh Steelers
2021— T. J. Watt, Pittsburgh Steelers
2022— Chris Jones, Kansas City Chiefs
2023— T. J. Watt, Pittsburgh Steelers
2024— Patrick Surtain II, Denver Broncos
2025— Myles Garrett, Cleveland Browns

== Coach of the Year awards ==
See: National Football League Coach of the Year Award#Kansas City Committee of 101 AFC/NFC Coach of the Year Awards

NFC Coach of the Year
1969— Bud Grant, Minnesota Vikings
1970— Dick Nolan, San Francisco 49ers
1971— George Allen, Washington Redskins
1972— Dan Devine, Green Bay Packers
1973— Chuck Knox, Los Angeles Rams
1974— Don Coryell, St. Louis Cardinals
1975— Tom Landry, Dallas Cowboys
1976— George Allen, Washington Redskins
1977— Leeman Bennett, Atlanta Falcons
1978— Dick Vermeil, Philadelphia Eagles
1979— Dick Vermeil, Philadelphia Eagles
1980— Leeman Bennett, Atlanta Falcons
1981— Bill Walsh, San Francisco 49ers
1982— No award due to players strike
1983— Joe Gibbs, Washington Redskins
1984— Bill Walsh, San Francisco 49ers
1985— Mike Ditka, Chicago Bears
1986— Bill Parcells, New York Giants
1987— Jim Mora, New Orleans Saints
1988— Mike Ditka, Chicago Bears
1989— Lindy Infante, Green Bay Packers
1990— George Seifert, San Francisco 49ers
1991— Wayne Fontes, Detroit Lions
1992— Mike Holmgren, Green Bay Packers
1993— Dan Reeves, New York Giants
1994— Dave Wannstedt, Chicago Bears
1995— Ray Rhodes, Philadelphia Eagles
1996— Dom Capers, Carolina Panthers
1997— Jim Fassel, New York Giants
1998— Dan Reeves, Atlanta Falcons
1999— Dick Vermeil, St. Louis Rams
2000— Jim Haslett, New Orleans Saints
2001— Dick Jauron, Chicago Bears
2002— Andy Reid, Philadelphia Eagles
2003— Bill Parcells, Dallas Cowboys
2004— Jim Mora, Jr., Atlanta Falcons
2005— Lovie Smith, Chicago Bears
2006— Sean Payton, New Orleans Saints
2007— Mike McCarthy, Green Bay Packers
2008— Mike Smith, Atlanta Falcons
2009— Sean Payton, New Orleans Saints
2010— Mike Smith, Atlanta Falcons
2011— Jim Harbaugh, San Francisco 49ers
2012— Pete Carroll, Seattle Seahawks
2013— Ron Rivera, Carolina Panthers
2014— Bruce Arians, Arizona Cardinals
2015— Ron Rivera, Carolina Panthers
2016— Jason Garrett, Dallas Cowboys
2017— Sean McVay, Los Angeles Rams
2018— Matt Nagy, Chicago Bears
2019— Kyle Shanahan, San Francisco 49ers
2020— Ron Rivera, Washington Football Team
2021— Matt LaFleur, Green Bay Packers
2022— Brian Daboll, New York Giants
2023— Dan Campbell, Detroit Lions
2024— Kevin O'Connell, Minnesota Vikings
2025— Mike Macdonald, Seattle Seahawks

AFC Coach of the Year
1969— Hank Stram, Kansas City Chiefs
1970— Paul Brown, Cincinnati Bengals
1971— Don Shula, Miami Dolphins
1972— Don Shula, Miami Dolphins
1973— John Ralston, Denver Broncos
1974— Sid Gillman, Houston Oilers
1975— Ted Marchibroda, Baltimore Colts
1976— Chuck Fairbanks, New England Patriots
1977— Red Miller, Denver Broncos
1978— Jack Patera, Seattle Seahawks
1979— Don Coryell, San Diego Chargers
1980— Chuck Knox, Buffalo Bills
1981— Forrest Gregg, Cincinnati Bengals
1982— No award due to players strike
1983— Chuck Knox, Seattle Seahawks
1984— Dan Reeves, Denver Broncos
1985— Raymond Berry, New England Patriots
1986— Marty Schottenheimer, Cleveland Browns
1987— Ron Meyer, Indianapolis Colts
1988— Marv Levy, Buffalo Bills
1989— Dan Reeves, Denver Broncos
1990— Art Shell, Los Angeles Raiders
1991— Dan Reeves, Denver Broncos
1992— Bobby Ross, San Diego Chargers
1993— Jack Pardee, Houston Oilers
1994— Bill Cowher, Pittsburgh Steelers
1995— Marty Schottenheimer, Kansas City Chiefs
1996— Mike Shanahan, Denver Broncos
1997— Marty Schottenheimer, Kansas City Chiefs
1998— Mike Shanahan, Denver Broncos
1999— Jim Mora, Indianapolis Colts
2000— Jon Gruden, Oakland Raiders
2001— Bill Belichick, New England Patriots
2002— Jeff Fisher, Tennessee Titans
2003— Bill Belichick, New England Patriots
2004— Marty Schottenheimer San Diego Chargers
2005— Tony Dungy, Indianapolis Colts
2006— Eric Mangini, New York Jets
2007— Bill Belichick, New England Patriots
2008— Tony Sparano, Miami Dolphins
2009— Marvin Lewis, Cincinnati Bengals
2010— Todd Haley, Kansas City Chiefs
2011— Gary Kubiak, Houston Texans
2012— Chuck Pagano and Bruce Arians, co-winners, Indianapolis Colts
2013— Andy Reid, Kansas City Chiefs
2014— Bill Belichick, New England Patriots
2015— Andy Reid, Kansas City Chiefs
2016— Jack Del Rio, Oakland Raiders
2017— Doug Marrone, Jacksonville Jaguars
2018— Frank Reich, Indianapolis Colts
2019— John Harbaugh, Baltimore Ravens
2020— Kevin Stefanski, Cleveland Browns
2021— Mike Vrabel, Tennessee Titans
2022— Doug Pederson, Jacksonville Jaguars
2023— DeMeco Ryans, Houston Texans
2024— Andy Reid, Kansas City Chiefs
2025— Mike Vrabel, New England Patriots

== Lamar Hunt Award ==
- 2008— Members of the "Foolish Club" (original eight owners of the AFL; Lamar Hunt (Dallas Texans), Bud Adams, Jr. (Houston Oilers), Harry Wismer (Titans of New York), Bob Howsam (Denver Broncos), Barron Hilton (Los Angeles Chargers), Ralph C. Wilson, Jr. (Buffalo Bills), Billy Sullivan (Boston Patriots), and Chet Soda (Oakland Raiders).)
- 2009— Tony Dungy
- 2010— Monday Night Football
- 2011— NFL Films
- 2012— Roger Staubach
- 2013— Don Shula
- 2014— Len Dawson
- 2015— Paul Tagliabue
- 2016— Super Bowl I
- 2017— Al Michaels
- 2018— Peyton Manning
- 2019— Super Bowls III and IV
- 2020— Bart Starr
- 2021— No award
- 2022— No award
- 2023— John Madden
- 2024— Chris Berman

== See also ==
- Bert Bell Award
- Maxwell Football Club
- Touchdown Club of Columbus
- DC Touchdown Club
- National Football League Most Valuable Player Award
- NFL Defensive Player of the Year Award
- NFL Offensive Player of the Year Award
- UPI AFL-AFC Player of the Year
- UPI NFC Player of the Year
