= Logos and uniforms of the Kansas City Chiefs =

The Kansas City Chiefs, a professional American football franchise from the National Football League, are known for their unique "KC" arrowhead logo and red and white uniforms—both almost unchanged since the franchise's relocation in 1963. From 1960 to 1962, the team was known as the Dallas Texans and had very similar team logos and uniforms.

== Logos ==
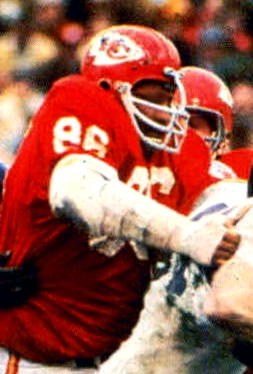
Since the team's relocation to Kansas City, the Chiefs have featured their "arrowhead" logo on their helmets.

When the Texans began playing in 1960, the team's logo consisted of the state of Texas in white with a yellow star marking the location of the city of Dallas. Originally, Hunt chose Columbia Blue and Orange for the Texans' uniforms, but Bud Adams chose the Columbia blue for his Houston Oilers franchise. Hunt reverted to red and gold for the Texans' uniforms, which even after the team relocated to Kansas City, remain as the franchise's colors to this day.

The state of Texas on the team's helmet was replaced by a design originally sketched by Lamar Hunt on a napkin. Hunt's inspiration for the interlocking "KC" design was the "SF" inside of an oval on the San Francisco 49ers helmets. Kansas City's overlapping initials appear inside a white arrowhead instead of an oval and are surrounded by a thin black outline. From 1960 to 1973, the Chiefs had grey facemask bars on their helmets, but changed to white bars for 1974.

Prior to the inaugural American Football League season in 1960, Hunt's Texans were represented by a whirling, spur-clad, 10-gallon-hat-wearing character that was featured on various promotional items. The logo eventually gave way to a more polished football-toting gunslinger set over the state of Texas, a design created by Bob Taylor, a cartoonist for the now-defunct Dallas Times Herald. Although never part of the club's uniform, Taylor's updated Texans logo adorned everything from the club's stationery to the billboard outside the team's offices.

When the franchise moved in 1963, Taylor was commissioned to produce a new logo that remained strikingly similar to his original incarnation. Taylor's new rendition featured a Native American figure running with the same stride and holding the pigskin in the same manner as the gunslinger with the states of Missouri, Kansas, Nebraska, Oklahoma, Iowa and Arkansas serving as his backdrop. This logo was utilized prominently during the 1960s and was affixed to the club's Swope Park headquarters on 63rd Street before the club moved to Arrowhead Stadium in 1972. The logo, embedded in the grass, still remains off the highway to this day.

In 2014, popular sports uniform evaluation blog Uni Watch made an observation that throughout the team's history there has been an inconsistency in the usage of the logo regarding the letter "C" in "KC". In some usages the "C" has an open face, and in others it is closed. When asked about this, the Chiefs PR and equipment staff said, "there is no rhyme or reason to it. Wish I had more to tell you, but it definitely is interesting. Never noticed that before!"

Also, the Kansas City Chiefs logo has the same concept of the Kansas City Royals, the Kansas/Missouri team for the MLB. Both of the logos have the KC crossing over each other, just the Royals logo is Royal Blue, and the K loops into the C.

== Uniforms ==
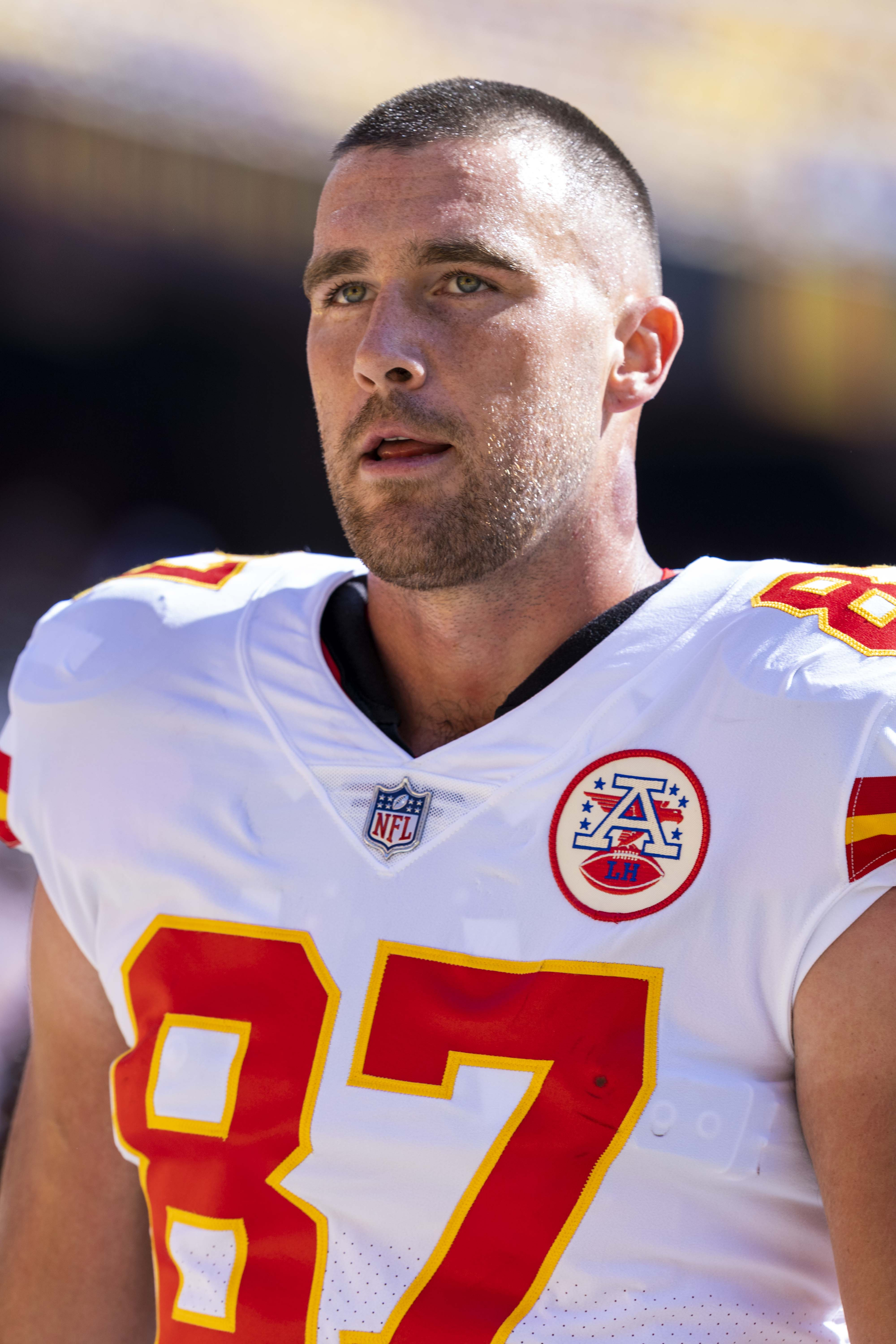
Travis Kelce, pictured in 2021. Since 2007 the team's uniforms have featured a patch honoring both team founder Lamar Hunt and the franchise's origins in the American Football League.

Unlike several NFL franchises, the Chiefs' uniform design has essentially remained the same throughout the club's history. It consists of a red helmet, and either red or white jerseys with the opposite color numbers and names. White pants were used with both jerseys from 1960–1967 and 1989–1999. After a brief disappearance, the Chiefs re-introduced the all-white uniform combinations for the 2006 season.

Although many NFL teams in recent years have worn their dark jerseys with their dark pants, the Chiefs unveiled their all-red combination for their 2013 home opener against the Dallas Cowboys. When the Chiefs wear their red uniforms, they had always worn white pants, until September 15, 2013. The Chiefs have never worn an alternate jersey in a game, although gold jerseys with red numbers trimmed in white, and black jerseys with red numbers trimmed in gold, are sold for retail.

The white jersey–red pants combination was not used between 1989 and 1999, primarily during the period when Marty Schottenheimer was the team's head coach. In 2006, under new head coach Herman Edwards, the Chiefs wore white uniforms with white pants at home against the Cincinnati Bengals. Prior to that game, the Chiefs had only worn their white jerseys at home in 1980, which they did for all eight home games that season under Marv Levy.

Following Lamar Hunt's death on December 13, 2006, the Chiefs wore the all-white combination for road games against the San Diego Chargers on December 17 and Oakland Raiders on December 23. It is said the all-white combination was a tribute to Hunt, who reportedly favored the all-white uniforms. The team wore the all-white combination in their playoff game versus the Indianapolis Colts. The team did not wear the all-white combination during the 2007 and 2008 seasons.

In 2009, the Chiefs wore the all-white Dallas Texans throwback uniform in an AFL Legacy game against the Oakland Raiders November 15. They wore the modern all-white uniform against the Cincinnati Bengals December 27.

In 2007, the Chiefs honored the late Lamar Hunt and the AFL with a special patch. In 2008, the patch became permanently affixed to the chest of both Kansas City's home and away jerseys. The patch itself is inspired by the Ten-Year AFL Patch, an acknowledgement honoring the league's decade-long existence worn by the Chiefs in the final game played by an AFL team, Super Bowl IV, which ended with a Chiefs victory.

In select games for the 2009 season, the Chiefs—as well as the other founding teams of the American Football League—wore "throwback" uniforms to celebrate the AFL's 50th anniversary and the 1962 Dallas Texans team that won the AFL Championship.

A slight change was made to the uniforms when Nike became the supplier of all NFL jerseys. The numbers were moved from to the top of the shoulders and the stripes on the sleeves were made larger.

The team wore football-shaped "NKH" patches in their 2023 season to honor the widow of the team's founder Norma Hunt, who had died in the offseason. The team's jerseys during Super Bowl LVIII will also feature the patch.

== Gallery of uniform combinations ==
Below are examples of the Chiefs' uniform combinations. The only one not shown is the Chiefs all red alternate uniform.

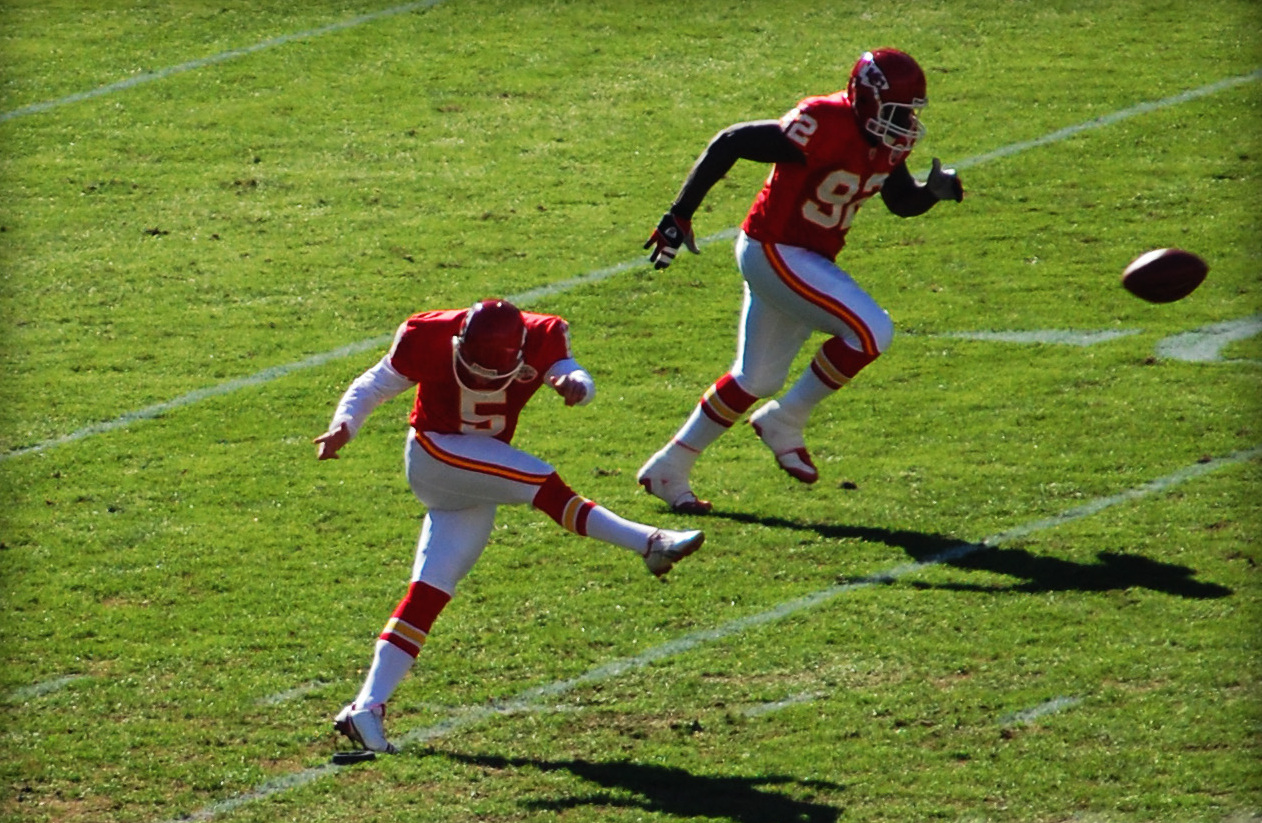
Home-red jersey white pants

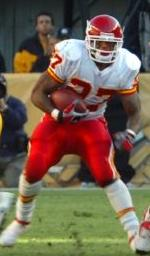
Road-white jersey red pants

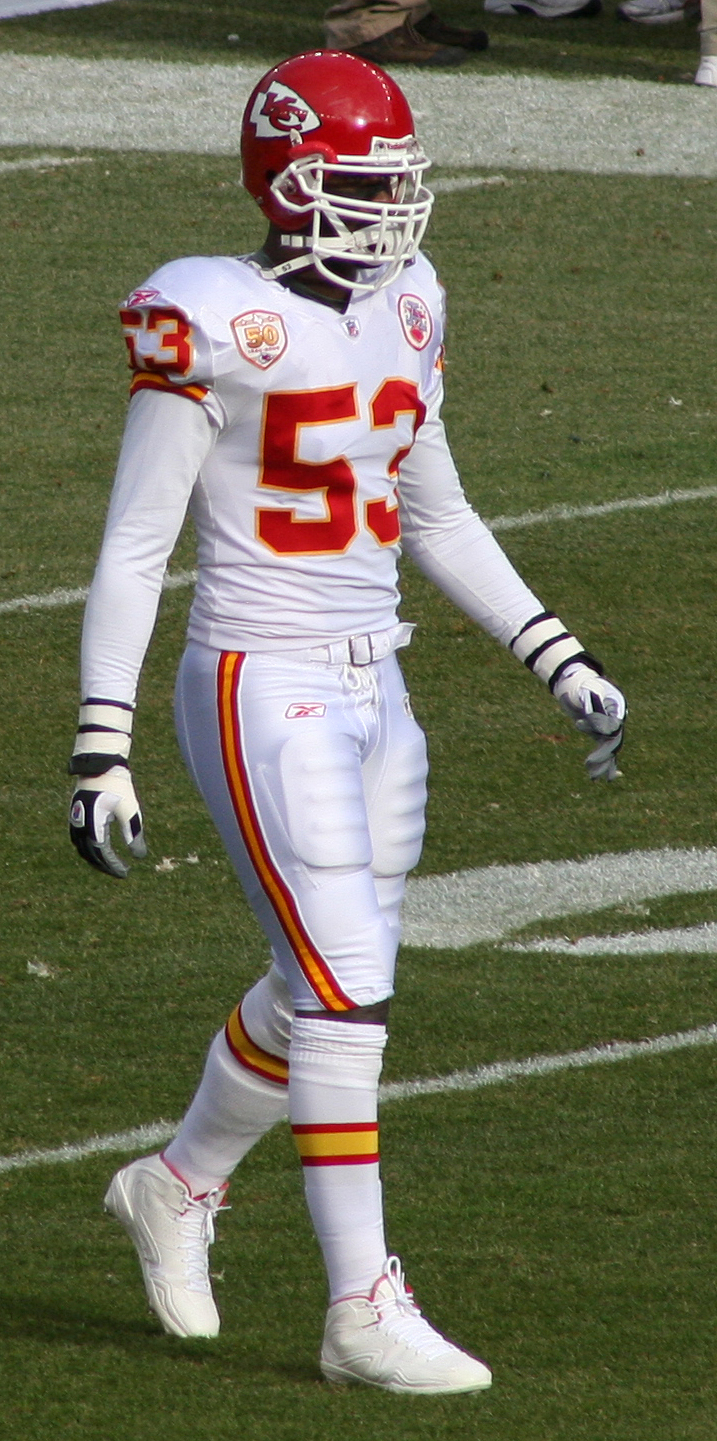
Road-all white alternate
