= List of American and Canadian cities by defunct football franchises =

Minor professional leagues such as the original United Football League, Atlantic Coast Football League, Seaboard Football League and Continental Football League existed in abundance in the 1960s and early 1970s, to varying degrees of success.

The National Football League held a monopoly on professional football in the United States for most of the 1950s, a rare occurrence for a league that had at least one competing league in every year since 1934. By 1960, a group of potential professional football owners that would become known as the Foolish Club had become frustrated with their efforts to buy into the NFL (some were NFL franchise minority owners such as Harry Wismer and Ralph Wilson; others, such as Lamar Hunt and Bud Adams, had tried but failed to buy NFL teams) and formed a new league, the American Football League. It was the eighth professional football league to use the name and the fourth to be universally considered a major-league competitor to the NFL. The AFL would prove to be the NFL's most formidable challenger to date.

== After the AFL-NFL merger ==
Several other professional football leagues have been formed since the AFL-NFL merger, though none have had the success of the AFL. In 1974, the World Football League formed and was able to attract such stars as Larry Csonka away from the NFL with lucrative contracts. However, most of the WFL franchises were insolvent and the league folded in 1975; the Memphis Southmen, the team that had signed Csonka and the most financially stable of the teams, unsuccessfully sued to join the NFL. The American Football Association formed as a continuation of the WFL's legacy in 1978, albeit on a much lower pay scale. That league lasted until 1982.

In 1982, the United States Football League formed as a spring league, and enjoyed moderate success during its first two seasons behind such stars as Jim Kelly and Herschel Walker. It moved its schedule to the fall in 1985, and tried to compete with the NFL directly, but it was unable to do so and folded, despite winning an anti-trust suit against the older league.

The NFL founded a developmental league known as the World League of American Football with teams based in the United States, Canada, and Europe. The WLAF ran for two years, from 1991 to 1992. The league went on a two-year hiatus before reorganizing as NFL Europe in 1995, with teams only in European cities. The name of the league was changed to NFL Europa in 2006. After the 2007 season, the NFL announced that it was closing down the league to focus its international marketing efforts in other ways, such as playing NFL regular season games in cities outside of the U.S.

Short-lived leagues such as the Regional Football League and Spring Football League formed in the wake of the dot-com boom but evaporated in short order after the boom ended.

In 2001, the XFL was formed as a joint venture between the World Wrestling Federation and the NBC television network. It folded after one season in the face of rapidly declining fan interest and a poor reputation. However, XFL stars such as Tommy Maddox and Rod "He Hate Me" Smart later saw success in the NFL.

The United Football League is a four-team fully professional league which played its first season in October–November 2009. Involved in this league are Mark Cuban, media mogul and owner of the National Basketball Association's Dallas Mavericks and William Hambrecht, a prominent Wall Street investor. The UFL has been beset with numerous financial problems, some of which stem from weak financial backing and an inability to get widespread national television coverage. It has so far played three seasons, the third of which was aborted two weeks prior to the season's end. As of June 2012, a fourth season remains in doubt.

The Stars Football League is a primarily Florida-based regional professional minor league that began play in 2011. Its two seasons to date, both only six weeks long, have been marked by extremely sparse attendance and little public visibility, but it has managed to send at least two players to NFL rosters.

== List of teams by metropolitan area ==
The following list contains all metropolitan areas in the United States and Canada containing at least one team in any of the defunct national/international professional outdoor gridiron football leagues beginning with (for the sake of simplicity, this will focus on American football leagues post the AFL-NFL merger) the World Football League onward. The table contains the population rank based on the table of primary census statistical areas in the 2010 United States census, and the list of census metropolitan areas in the Canada 2011 Census.

Metropolitan area	Country	Pop. rank	Population	WFL	USFL	WLAF	CFL USA	XFL
New York City	United States	1	22,085,649	—	Generals	—	—	Hitmen
Los Angeles	United States	2	17,877,006	Sun	Express	—	—	Xtreme
Baltimore–Washington	United States	4	8,572,971	—	Stars	—	Stallions	—

== See also ==
- History of American football
- List of American and Canadian cities by number of major professional sports franchises
  - U.S. cities with teams from four major league sports
  - Major professional sports leagues in the United States and Canada
- List of professional sports teams in the United States and Canada
