= Wayne Valley =

Wayne Valley may refer to:

- Wayne Valley High School, New Jersey, United States
- F. Wayne Valley (1914–1986), American businessman, philanthropist, Oakland Raiders owner and football player
