= Foolish Club =

Owners of the original franchises of the American Football League

The Foolish Club were the owners of the eight original franchises of the American Football League (AFL). When Texas oil heir and magnate Lamar Hunt and Bud Adams respectively were refused entry to the established National Football League (NFL) in 1959, they founded franchises in Dallas and Houston, and recruited businessmen in six other U.S. markets to form an eight-team rival circuit, calling it the American Football League.

Hunt owned the Dallas Texans (now the Kansas City Chiefs), while the Houston Oilers (now the Tennessee Titans) were Adams's franchise. The other members of the "Original Eight" included Harry Wismer (Titans of New York, now the New York Jets), Bob Howsam (Denver Broncos), Barron Hilton (Los Angeles Chargers), Ralph C. Wilson Jr. (Buffalo Bills), and Billy Sullivan (Boston Patriots, now the New England Patriots). Though Max Winter had originally committed to fielding a Minneapolis AFL team, he reneged when lured away by the NFL; Winter's group instead joined the older circuit as the Minnesota Vikings in 1961. The Minneapolis AFL franchise only went as far as participating in the 1960 American Football League draft and never fielded a team. It was replaced when a group of eight investors, led primarily by F. Wayne Valley and, briefly, Chet Soda, formed the Oakland Raiders, now the Las Vegas Raiders.

They called themselves the "Foolish Club" because of their seemingly foolhardy venture in taking on the entrenched NFL.

== Innovative start-up league ==
The AFL quickly became a viable competitor to the established league, in its first year signing half of the NFL's first-round draft choices, and introducing the first professional football gate and TV revenue-sharing plans, which made it financially stable. It went on to develop its own stars, and added expansion franchises in the Miami Dolphins (1966) and Cincinnati Bengals (1968).

After forcing a merger with the NFL in 1966, the now ten-team AFL entered the NFL intact in 1970. It became the only major U.S. sports league ever to merge with another without losing any franchises. The merger was the raison d'être for the first "Professional Football World Championship Games" (later called the Super Bowl), and after losing the first two games of that series to the Green Bay Packers of the elder league, the AFL closed out its ten-year existence with victories over the NFL's best teams after the 1968 (with the Jets upsetting the then-Baltimore Colts) and 1969 (the Chiefs defeating the Vikings) seasons.

== 50th anniversary remembrance (2009) ==
In the first exhibition game of the 2009 NFL season, the Pro Football Hall of Fame Game on August 9, both the Bills and Titans faced off, with both teams wearing their 1960s throwback uniforms as the Titans wearing the colors of the Houston Oilers. This contest kicked off what would have been the AFL's 50th season, featuring "AFL Legacy Weekends", in which teams of the "Original Eight" played one another wearing AFL period uniforms, game officials wore AFL "Chinese Red" striped uniforms and fields were designed in the innovative style used during the 1960s. The first regular season games served as the Monday Night Football season opener on September 14 as the Bills visited the now-New England Patriots and the current San Diego Chargers visited the Oakland Raiders.

== Personal legacies ==
The last surviving member of the Foolish Club, Barron Hilton, died in 2019; he had sold off the Chargers in 1966 to appease the board of directors of Hilton Hotels. With the AFL struggling in its early years, Howsam sold the Broncos after the first season, while Wismer sold the New York club in 1963. The Valley group eventually sold their shares of the Raiders in the 1970s after Al Davis took control over the club's team operations. After infamously bankrolling The Jackson Five's 1984 Victory Tour, financial difficulties forced Sullivan to sell his ownership stake in the Patriots in 1988 while Foxboro Stadium lapsed into bankruptcy; Sullivan remained team president until 1992 while Robert Kraft purchased the stadium out of bankruptcy to eventually use as leverage to buy the team in 1994. Ralph Wilson died in 2014 as Bills owner, but the estate instead auctioned off the Bills to the highest bidder when he died (his two surviving daughters were not directly involved in the team's operations during his lifetime).

The Hunt and Adams families continue to own their teams. After Lamar Hunt died in 2006, the Chiefs' ownership structure allowed each offspring to equally split the team. The official owner of record has been son Clark. After Bud Adams died in 2013, the Titans' ownership structure was split between his daughters Susie Smith and Amy Strunk, with an equal share by Susan Lewis, the widow of their brother Kenneth S. Adams III, who died in 1987, whose stake is split equally with their two sons Kenneth S. Adams IV and Barclay Adams, with Smith the owner of record. After Smith's sale of her stake, since 2021, Amy Strunk became the owner of record, splitting the ownership as the majority owner. Lewis owns a one-sixth ownership stake, as do her sons Kenneth S. Adams IV and Barclay Adams.

== Members ==
Name	Image	Team	Birth	Death	Divested team	Notes
Bud Adams		Houston Oilers	January 3, 1923	October 21, 2013	Still controlled by heirs	One of two Foolish Club members whose family continues to control their team: the Oilers relocated to Nashville, Tennessee in 1997 and were rebranded the Tennessee Titans. Daughter Amy Adams Strunk is primary owner, with the other half owned by Susan Lewis, the widow of her brother Kenneth S. Adams III, and their sons Kenneth S. Adams IV and Barclay Adams: Strunk's sister Susie Smith divested her stake of the team in 2017.
Barron Hilton		Los Angeles Chargers	October 23, 1927	September 19, 2019	1966	The last surviving member of the Club, dying in 2019. Played as the San Diego Chargers from 1961–2016. Sold team in 1966 to appease Hilton Hotels board of directors.
Bob Howsam		Denver Broncos	February 28, 1918	February 19, 2008	1961	Sold team to Gerald Phipps after one season.
Lamar Hunt		Dallas Texans	August 2, 1932	December 13, 2006	Still controlled by heirs	One of two Foolish Club members whose family continues to control their team: the Texans relocated to Kansas City and were rebranded as the Chiefs in 1963. Elected to the Pro Football Hall of Fame in 1972. As of 2023, the team is equally owned by four children — Clark Hunt, the legal owner of record upon his death, along with siblings Lamar Jr., Daniel, and sister Sharron Munson.
Chet Soda		Oakland Raiders	March 15, 1908	March 12, 1989	1960	Part-owner with F. Wayne Valley and Donald Blessing, replaced Minnesota-based group led by Max Winter. Was the presumed source of the team's original botched-Spanish name "Oakland Senors" [sic]; left before start of season.
F. Wayne Valley		Oakland Raiders	March 28, 1914	October 2, 1986	1976	Ousted by Al Davis. Team played as Los Angeles Raiders from 1982–94 and became the Las Vegas Raiders in 2020.
Billy Sullivan		Boston Patriots	September 13, 1915	February 23, 1998	1988	Team was renamed New England Patriots in 1971. Remained president until 1992; financial mismanagement eventually led to a takeover by current owner Robert Kraft.
Ralph Wilson		Buffalo Bills	October 17, 1918	March 25, 2014	September 9, 2014	Elected to the Pro Football Hall of Fame in 2009. The last member of the Foolish Club to be an active owner, ending with his death in 2014. Pegula Sports and Entertainment purchased the team in an estate sale.
Harry Wismer		Titans of New York	June 30, 1913	December 3, 1967	1963	Declared bankrupt after 1962 season: team was purchased by David "Sonny" Werblin and rebranded as the New York Jets.

== See also ==
- Other American Football League officials, coaches and players
- Current National Football League team owners
