= Donald Blessing =

American rower (1905–2000)

Olympic medal record

Men's rowing

Representing the United States
| Gold medal – first place | 1928 Amsterdam | Eight |

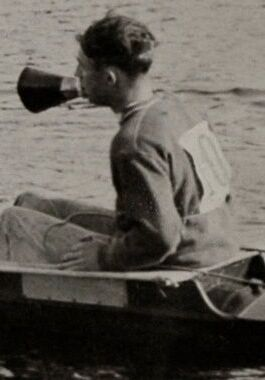
coxswain Donald Blessing (1928)

Donald F. "Don" Blessing (December 26, 1905 – July 4, 2000) was an American coxswain who competed in the 1928 Summer Olympics, held in Amsterdam. Blessing was born in Hollister, California, and attended Visalia Union High School.

In 1928, he was the coxswain of the American boat, which won the gold medal in the eights. Don was the Most Valuable Man as voted by his teammates on the UC/USA crew. The USA eight was composed of men from the University of California and was the first of 3 Olympic eights that would come from Cal and win gold. The university sent gold medal-winning crews in 1932 (Los Angeles) and 1948 (London), as well.

Don Blessing was a lifelong Californian, residing in Piedmont, CA and Belvedere, CA for most of his adult life. Married to Nola Dillon Blessing (deceased in February, 1985) from Walnut Creek, CA until her death in Palm Springs. Both were lifelong Bear Backers, with Don a charter member of the San Francisco Grid Club and among the first group of inductees to the University California Hall of Fame. His entire 1928 Cal Crew was inducted in 1986. Cal added olympic gold for the USA in 1932 and 1948, the only university to win three gold medals for the United States.

Blessing was one of eight minority owners in what originally was known as the Oakland Señores football club, and as such was indirectly a founding owner in the American Football League in 1960. Blessing, Chet Soda and five of the other six owners sold their stakes to fellow partner F. Wayne Valley before the start of the inaugural season, by which point the team was named the Oakland Raiders.

He had two children – Sherrell Blessing (deceased in 2022) and Don Blessing Jr. (deceased in 2003) and five grandchildren. He also had two great-grandchildren.
