= Milt Woodard =

American sprotswriter (1911–1996)

Milton Woodard
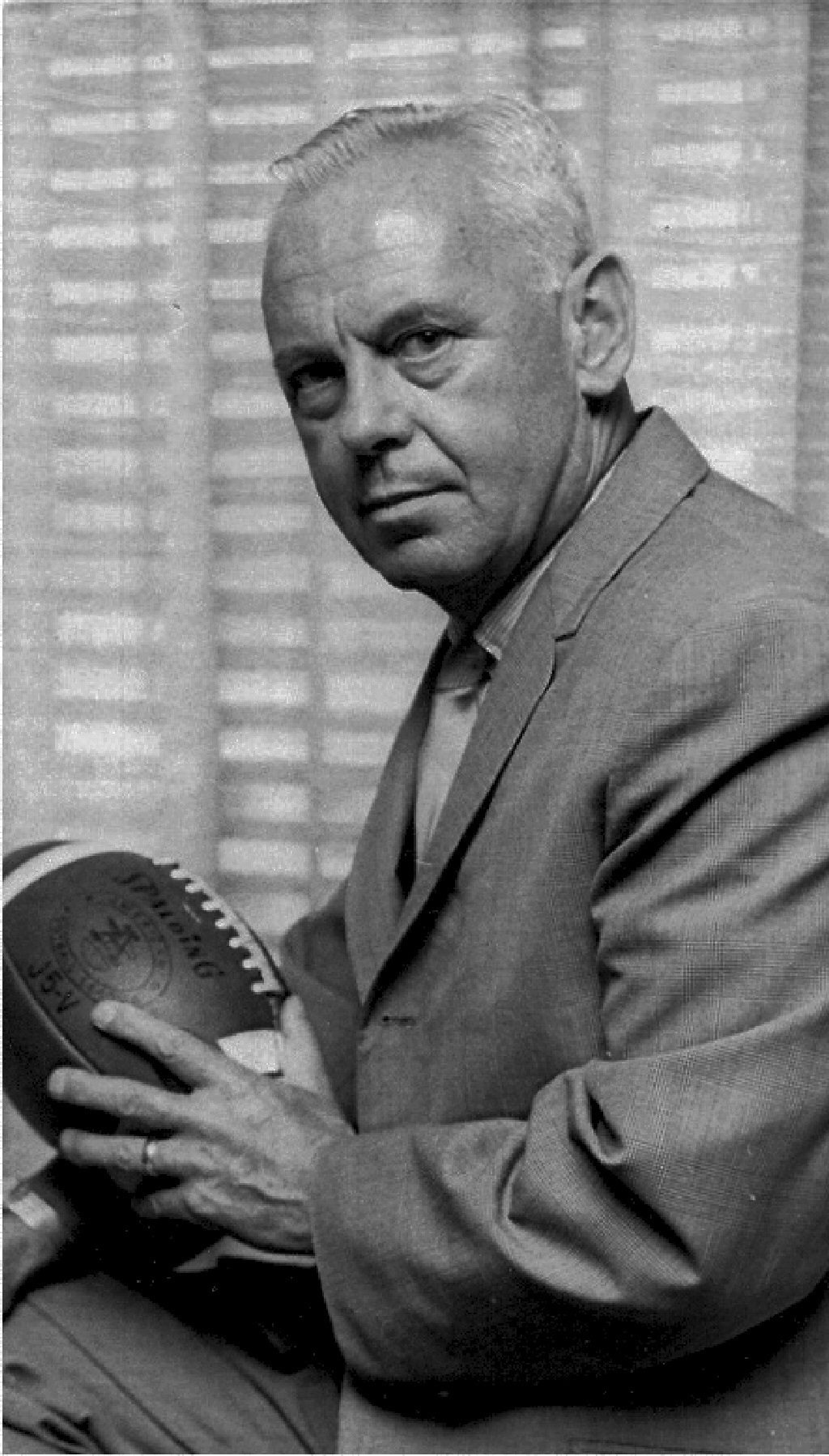
- Woodard in 1966
- Born: June 4, 1911; Tacoma, Washington, U.S.
- Died: March 3, 1996 (aged 84); San Jose, California, U.S.
- Education: College of Puget Sound (WA), B.A. 1933, (Journalism); University of Minnesota (MN)
- Occupations: Sports journalist, Sports executive
- Spouse(s): Corrine; Nancy; Frances
- Children: 2; Ross and Linda
- Football career

Career history
- American Football League (1960–1966), Assistant Commissioner; American Football League (1966–1970), President

Milton P. Woodard (June 4, 1911 – March 3, 1996) was an American sports writer and sport executive. He was the President of the American Football League until it merged with the NFL in 1970. Woodard served from July 1966 to March 1970, succeeding Commissioner Al Davis as chief executive of the League.

== Background ==
Woodard was born in Tacoma, Washington, where he attended Stadium High School and ran track and played football. His father was a railroad worker. He attended the College of Puget Sound (now the University of Puget Sound) in Washington, where he played baseball. He graduated in 1933. He subsequently went to the University of Minnesota. Woodard had a distinguished career as a sportswriter for the Tacoma News Tribune and at the Chicago Sun-Times, where he served as the beat writer for the Chicago White Sox. He also covered boxing at Chicago Stadium. In 1951, he published a book under the American-based sports magazine The Sporting News (now Sporting News, or TSN) entitled "So You Want to Run a Ball Club?". He wrote the track and field section of the 1945 Encyclopædia Britannica. He was the president of the Western Golf Association.

== AFL career ==
Milt served under Joe Foss as the Assistant Commissioner from its inception in 1960 until 1966. Following the assassination of John F. Kennedy on November 22, 1963, Woodard was instrumental in making the decision to postpone the week's American Football League games, while the National Football League continued with theirs. The AFL was praised for its choice by several prominent sportswriters of the time, such as Red Smith.

After briefly serving under Commissioner Al Davis, Woodard was appointed President of the American Football League in July 1966. The appointment came in the wake of the two leagues' agreement to merge, which had resulted in the transformation of the office of AFL Commissioner into that of a league presidency, which was to operate in a similar manner to the way the league presidencies of Major League Baseball operated at the time. After Davis refused to consider serving in such a role on the grounds it would be subordinate to the office of the NFL Commissioner, Woodard accepted the appointment in his place. He served until the merger was finalized in March 1970. At the urging of All-Star AFL player Jack Kemp, Woodard had a commemorative Ten-year AFL shoulder patch produced for the 1969 AFL Champion Kansas City Chiefs to wear when they played and defeated the NFL Champion Vikings in the fourth and final AFL-NFL World Championship Game after the 1969 pro football season. In 1989, Woodard was inducted into the Washington Sports Hall of Fame.

== Personal life ==
After his career in the AFL, he retired in La Jolla, California, where he played golf at the La Jolla Country Club. He was married to three women over the course of his life. His first wife was Corrine Woodard. With his second wife, Nancy, he fathered two children, Ross and Linda. He then married his third wife, Frances. He died in San Jose, California.
