= List of all-time NFL win–loss records =

The National Football League (NFL) is a professional American football league, which as of the end of its 2025 NFL season, consists of 32 teams. These teams are divided equally between the National Football Conference (NFC) and the American Football Conference (AFC), and both conferences contain four divisions with four teams each. Since its formation in 1920, as the American Professional Football Association (APFA), NFL game results have been recorded. Games in the NFL can either end with a winner and a loser, or the two teams can tie. The NFL officially counts ties in its standings; ties are registered as a half-win and a half-loss when calculating the win–loss percentage. However, this method of assessing ties in the win–loss percentage has only been in place since the 1972 season, meaning all ties prior do not affect a team's win percentage.

One of only two charter members of the NFL still in existence, the Chicago Bears, have played the most games (1,503) and recorded the most ties (42) in NFL regular season history. Their NFC North divisional rivals, the Green Bay Packers have recorded the most wins (819) in NFL history. The league's other still-active charter member, the Arizona Cardinals, have recorded the most regular season losses (826), through the 2025 season. The Green Bay Packers hold the highest regular season win–loss percentage (.572), with a 819–611– 39 (8) record through the 2025 season. The Tampa Bay Buccaneers maintain the lowest regular season win–loss percentage (.412), holding a 326–466–1 record through 2025. Being the most-recently founded franchise in the NFL, the Houston Texans have recorded the fewest regular season games played (389) and wins (174). The Ravens have recorded the fewest regular season losses (208). Through the end of the 2025 regular season, the Jacksonville Jaguars are the only team that has not yet recorded a tie.

Following the regular season, teams that won their respective divisions, in addition to three wild card teams determined by a conference's next best three teams—regardless of division—qualify for the league's postseason, called the playoffs. (Note: These parameters to qualify for the NFL playoffs have been in place since the 2020 NFL season.) Ties cannot occur in the playoffs. The Cowboys have played in the most playoff games (67), through the 2025–26 NFL playoffs. The Patriots have the highest playoff win–loss percentage (.635), with a 40–23 record, as of the end of LX. The San Francisco 49ers and New England Patriots have the most post-season victories (40) in NFL playoff history, while the Minnesota Vikings have the most playoff losses (32). The Los Angeles Chargers have the lowest playoff win–loss percentage of all-time, respectively holding a record of 12–21 (.364). The Houston Texans have the fewest games played (16), wins (7), and losses (9) in NFL playoff history.

The NFL officially counts and includes the statistical records logged by teams that played in the American Football League (AFL) and All-America Football Conference (AAFC). AFL statistics were incorporated upon the AFL–NFL merger in 1970; meanwhile, though the AAFC merged into the NFL in 1950, the NFL did not begin incorporating AAFC statistics and history into its own record books until April 1, 2025.

== Regular season ==
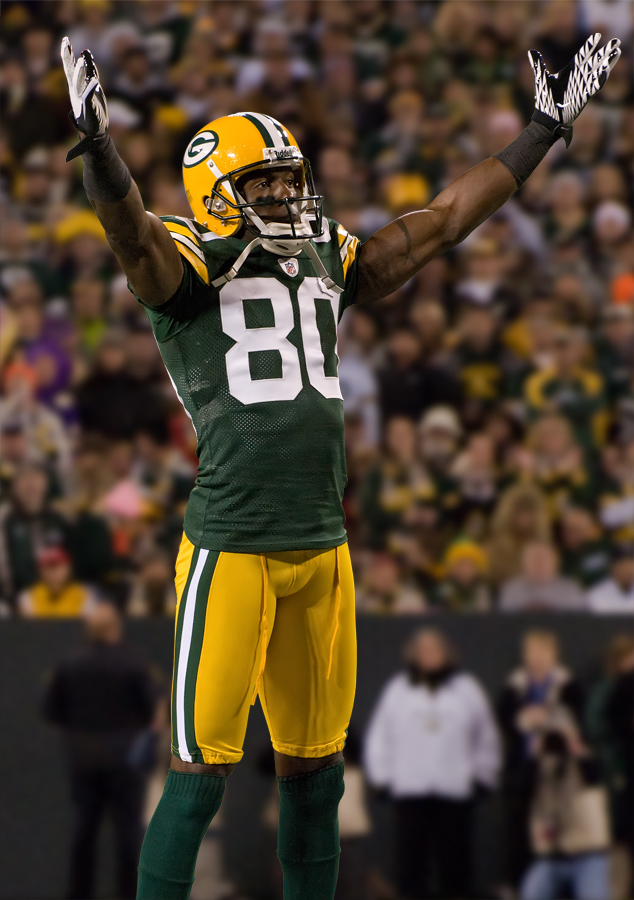
Donald Driver, who appeared in 127 of the Green Bay Packers' 819 wins, the most of any franchise in NFL history.

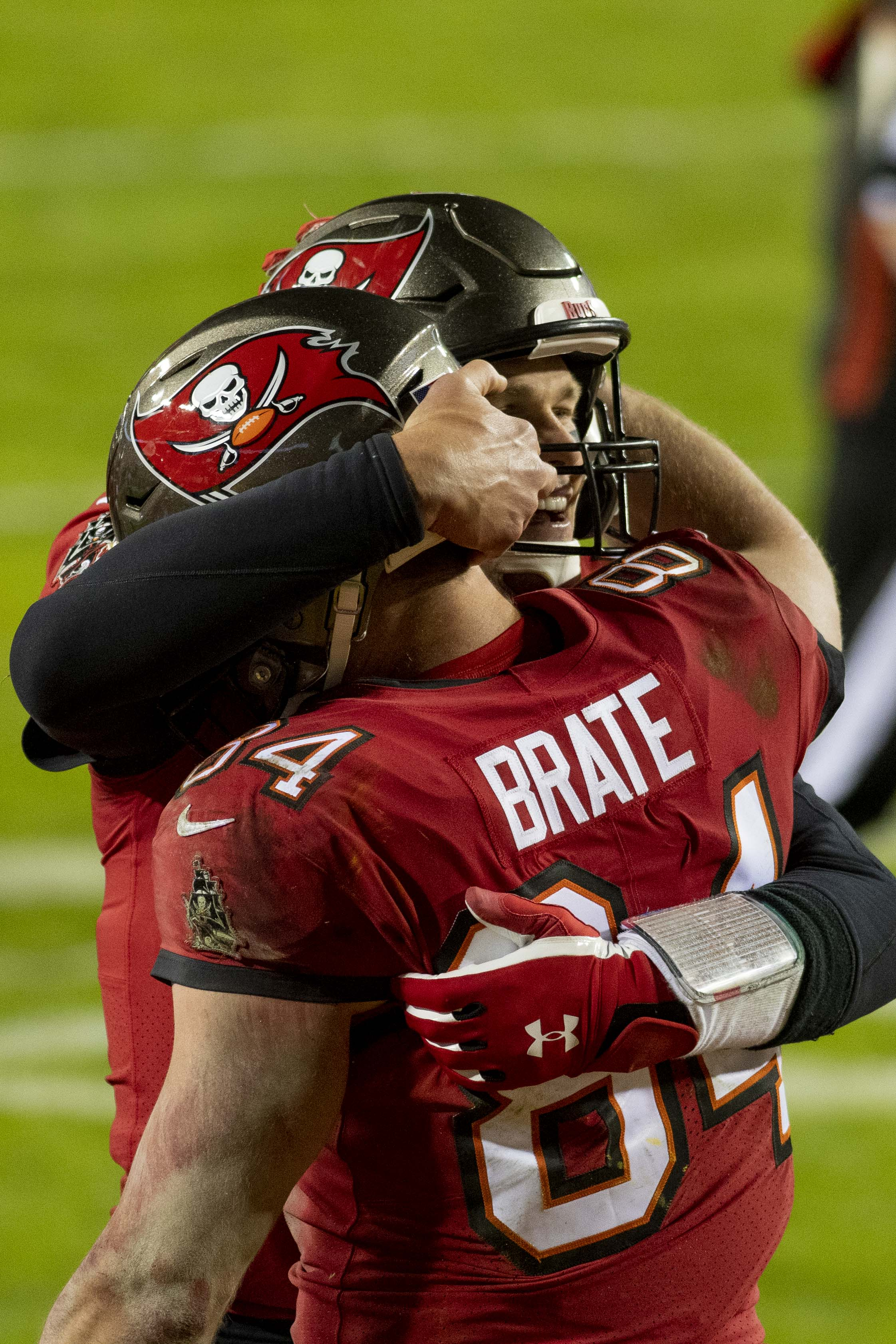
Players of the Tampa Bay Buccaneers, who have the lowest win–loss percentage (.412) in the NFL regular season.

The following is a listing of all 32 current National Football League (NFL) teams ranked by their regular season win–loss record percentage, accurate as of the end of the 2025 NFL season.

Best win–loss record in division

| Rank | Team | GP | Won | Lost | Tied (Note: Ties prior to the 1972 season are not included in winning percentages, as the NFL did not officially incorporate them when calculating a team's winning percentage until the 1972 season. For teams that began play prior to 1972, their ties since the 1972 season are listed in parentheses and are incorporated into a team's winning percentage.) | Pct. | First NFL season | Division |
|---|---|---|---|---|---|---|---|---|
| 1 | Green Bay Packers | 1,476 | 824 | 614 | 39 (8) | .573 | 1921 | NFC North |
| 2 | Dallas Cowboys | 1,022 | 580 | 437 | 7 (1) | .570 | 1960 | NFC East |
| 3 | Baltimore Ravens | 492 | 280 | 213 | 1 | .568 | 1996 | AFC North |
| 4 | New England Patriots | 1,024 | 569 | 457 | 9 (0) | .555 | 1960 | AFC East |
| 5 | Chicago Bears | 1,510 | 816 | 654 | 42 (1) | .555 | 1920 | NFC North |
| 6 | Kansas City Chiefs | 1,023 | 559 | 454 | 12 (4) | .552 | 1960 | AFC West |
| 7 | Minnesota Vikings | 1,009 | 552 | 448 | 11 (4) | .552 | 1961 | NFC North |
| 8 | Miami Dolphins | 939 | 512 | 425 | 4 (1) | .546 | 1966 | AFC East |
| 9 | San Francisco 49ers (Note: As AAFC statistics are officially counted by the NFL, the Browns' regular season win–loss record now includes a 47–4–3 record compiled in the All-America Football Conference from 1946 to 1949, as well their 5–0 playoff record compiled during the same period. Likewise, the 49ers' AAFC regular season win–loss record of 38–14–2, and their 1–1 AAFC playoff record are also officially counted.) | 1,196 | 649 | 532 | 16 (3) | .549 | 1946 | NFC West |
| 10 | Pittsburgh Steelers | 1,312 | 697 | 594 | 22 (4) | .540 | 1933 | AFC North |
| 11 | Denver Broncos | 1,024 | 537 | 477 | 10 (4) | .529 | 1960 | AFC West |
| 12 | Seattle Seahawks | 800 | 421 | 380 | 1 | .526 | 1976 | NFC West |
| 13 | Indianapolis Colts (Note: The Indianapolis Colts' win–loss records include their time as the Baltimore Colts, but the original Baltimore Colts of the AAFC are considered as a separate franchise.) | 1,106 | 574 | 526 | 8 (2) | .522 | 1953 | AFC South |
| 14 | New York Giants | 1,445 | 732 | 678 | 35 (4) | .519 | 1925 | NFC East |
| 15 | Los Angeles Rams | 1,275 | 641 | 615 | 21 (3) | .510 | 1937 | NFC West |
| 16 | Las Vegas Raiders | 1,024 | 516 | 499 | 11 (2) | .508 | 1960 | AFC West |
| 17 | Cleveland Browns (Note: The NFL considers the current Browns franchise as having been established in 1946, joining the NFL in 1950, suspending operations from 1996 through 1998, and then resuming play as an expansion team in 1999. The Baltimore Ravens are officially considered a 1996 expansion franchise in terms of team history and records.) | 1,148 | 572 | 564 | 14 (4) | .504 | 1946 | AFC North |
| 18 | Philadelphia Eagles | 1,328 | 651 | 652 | 27 (7) | .500 | 1933 | NFC East |
| 19 | Los Angeles Chargers | 1,023 | 505 | 517 | 11 (2) | .494 | 1960 | AFC West |
| 20 | Washington Commanders | 1,341 | 648 | 665 | 30 (3) | .494 | 1932 | NFC East |
| 21 | Buffalo Bills | 1,022 | 505 | 511 | 8 (1) | .497 | 1960 | AFC East |
| 22 | Tennessee Titans | 1,024 | 483 | 536 | 6 (0) | .474 | 1960 | AFC South |
| 23 | New Orleans Saints | 926 | 428 | 500 | 5 (1) | .461 | 1967 | NFC South |
| 24 | Detroit Lions | 1,372 | 621 | 719 | 34 (5) | .464 | 1930 | NFC North |
| 25 | Cincinnati Bengals | 910 | 415 | 492 | 5 (4) | .458 | 1968 | AFC North |
| 26 | Carolina Panthers | 507 | 230 | 277 | 1 | .454 | 1995 | NFC South |
| 27 | Houston Texans | 396 | 177 | 224 | 1 | .442 | 2002 | AFC South |
| 28 | Atlanta Falcons | 940 | 409 | 527 | 6 (2) | .437 | 1966 | NFC South |
| 29 | New York Jets | 1,024 | 438 | 580 | 8 (2) | .430 | 1960 | AFC East |
| 30 | Jacksonville Jaguars | 507 | 221 | 289 | 0 | .433 | 1995 | AFC South |
| 31 | Arizona Cardinals | 1,470 | 599 | 835 | 41 (6) | .418 | 1920 | NFC West |
| 32 | Tampa Bay Buccaneers | 800 | 329 | 478 | 1 | .408 | 1976 | NFC South |
Win–loss records sourced from Pro-Football-Reference.com

== Playoffs ==
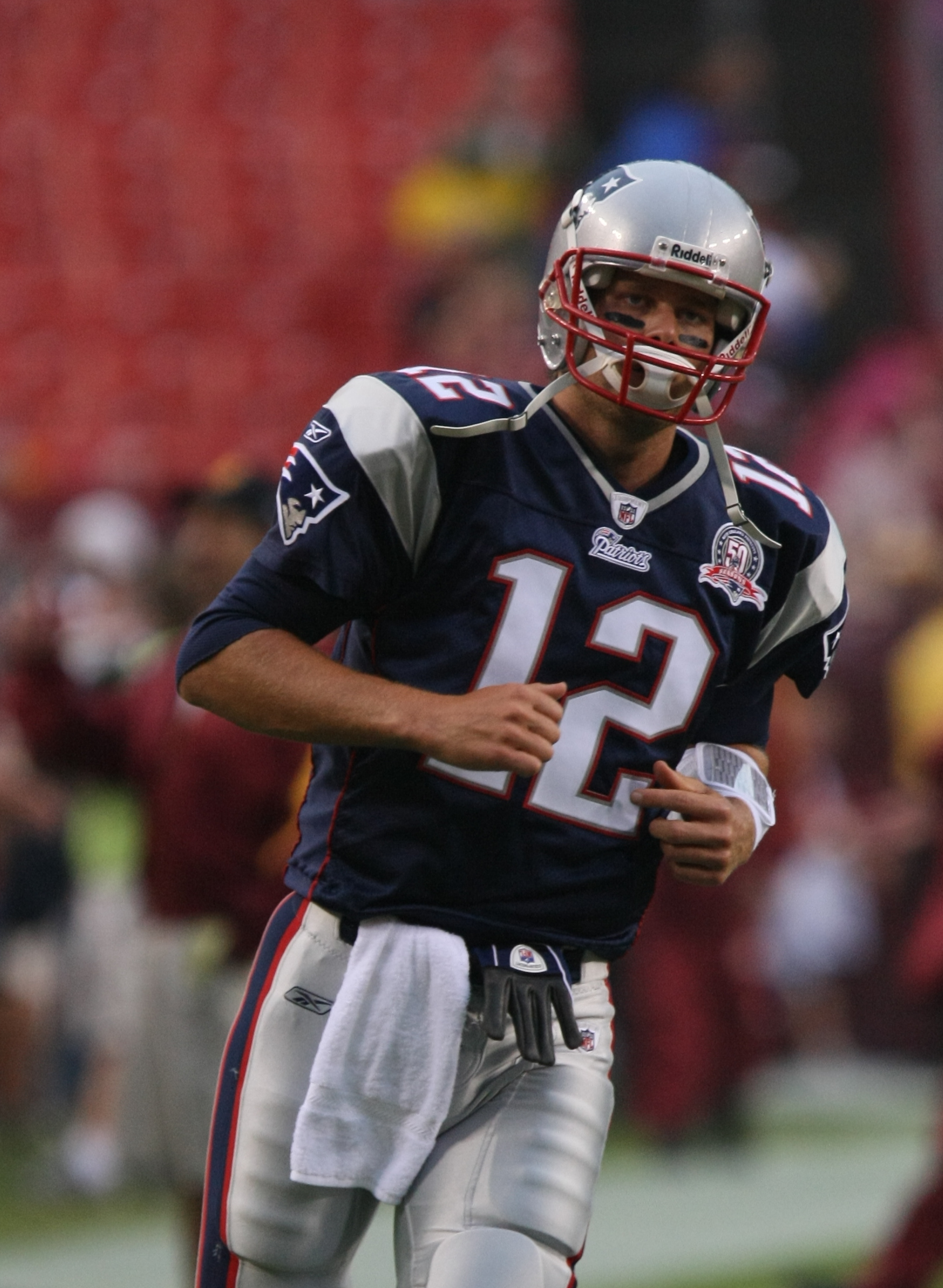
Tom Brady, quarterback of the New England Patriots (from 2000–2019), the team with the highest playoff win–loss percentage. Brady had a 30–11 postseason record as the Patriots' starting quarterback.

The following is a listing of all 32 current National Football League (NFL) teams ranked by their playoff win–loss percentage, accurate as of the 2025–26 NFL playoffs.

| Best win–loss record in division | Team active in playoffs |

| Rank | Team | GP | Won | Lost | Pct. | Last playoff appearance | Division |
|---|---|---|---|---|---|---|---|
| 1 | New England Patriots | 63 | 40 | 23 | .635 | 2025 | AFC East |
| 2 | San Francisco 49ers | 66 | 40 | 26 | .606 | 2025 | NFC West |
| 3 | Green Bay Packers | 65 | 37 | 28 | .569 | 2025 | NFC North |
| 4 | Baltimore Ravens | 32 | 18 | 14 | .563 | 2024 | AFC North |
| 5 | Las Vegas Raiders | 45 | 25 | 20 | .556 | 2021 | AFC West |
| 6 | Pittsburgh Steelers | 66 | 36 | 30 | .545 | 2025 | AFC North |
| 7 | Washington Commanders | 46 | 25 | 21 | .543 | 2024 | NFC East |
| 8 | Kansas City Chiefs | 48 | 26 | 22 | .542 | 2024 | AFC West |
| 9 | Dallas Cowboys | 67 | 36 | 31 | .537 | 2023 | NFC East |
| 10 | Denver Broncos | 45 | 24 | 21 | .533 | 2025 | AFC West |
| 11 | Philadelphia Eagles | 56 | 29 | 27 | .518 | 2025 | NFC East |
| 12 | Seattle Seahawks | 39 | 20 | 19 | .513 | 2025 | NFC West |
| 13 | Carolina Panthers | 18 | 9 | 9 | .500 | 2025 | NFC South |
| 14 | Los Angeles Rams | 59 | 29 | 30 | .492 | 2025 | NFC West |
| 15 | New York Giants | 51 | 25 | 26 | .490 | 2022 | NFC East |
| 16 | Buffalo Bills | 45 | 22 | 23 | .489 | 2025 | AFC East |
| 17 (tied) | New York Jets | 25 | 12 | 13 | .480 | 2010 | AFC East |
| 17 (tied) | Tampa Bay Buccaneers | 25 | 12 | 13 | .480 | 2024 | NFC South |
| 19 | Indianapolis Colts | 48 | 23 | 25 | .479 | 2020 | AFC South |
| 20 | Jacksonville Jaguars | 17 | 8 | 9 | .471 | 2025 | AFC South |
| 21 | Miami Dolphins | 43 | 20 | 23 | .465 | 2023 | AFC East |
| 22 | Chicago Bears | 39 | 18 | 21 | .462 | 2025 | NFC North |
| 23 | Houston Texans | 16 | 7 | 9 | .438 | 2025 | AFC South |
| 24 | Cleveland Browns | 39 | 17 | 22 | .436 | 2023 | AFC North |
| 25 | New Orleans Saints | 23 | 10 | 13 | .435 | 2020 | NFC South |
| 26 | Tennessee Titans | 40 | 17 | 23 | .425 | 2021 | AFC South |
| 27 | Atlanta Falcons | 24 | 10 | 14 | .417 | 2017 | NFC South |
| 28 | Arizona Cardinals | 17 | 7 | 10 | .412 | 2021 | NFC West |
| 29 | Minnesota Vikings | 53 | 21 | 32 | .396 | 2024 | NFC North |
| 30 | Cincinnati Bengals | 26 | 10 | 16 | .385 | 2022 | AFC North |
| 31 | Detroit Lions | 24 | 9 | 15 | .375 | 2024 | NFC North |
| 32 | Los Angeles Chargers | 33 | 12 | 21 | .364 | 2025 | AFC West |

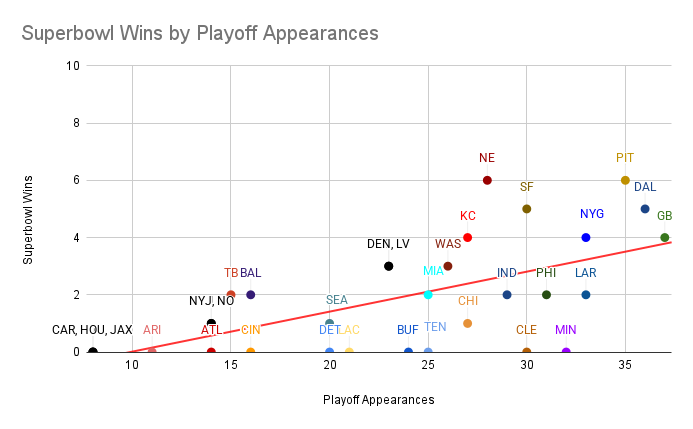
Graph of NFL team playoff appearance to Super Bowl win ratio
