= Ten-year AFL patch =

Shoulder patch used by American Football League teams

The shoulder patch worn by the AFL's Kansas City Chiefs in the fourth AFL-NFL Championship game

The Ten-Year AFL Patch is a shoulder patch adapted for use on American Football League (AFL) team uniforms.

== History ==
During the entire 1969 professional football season, all NFL players wore a shoulder patch on their uniforms, reading "50 NFL", marking the 50 years which had passed since the league's initial organization. American Football League fan Ange Coniglio petitioned the AFL owners to have their players wear a patch commemorating the league's 10 years, especially since it was the AFL's final year. The AFL owners declined, in Lamar Hunt's words, because they felt that a patch would make the uniforms "too busy".

Coniglio enlisted the support of AFL President Milt Woodard and of AFL players. At his urging, the idea was also advanced by Jack Kemp in a request to Pete Rozelle. As reported in the Kansas City Chiefs' 2006 Press Guide, Woodard had a patch made to be used by whichever team won the final AFL Championship. It turned out that AFL founder Lamar Hunt's Chiefs would be in the final AFL-NFL World Championship Game, and Hunt agreed to have the Chiefs wear a ten-year AFL patch in Super Bowl IV. The outline of the patch resembles that of the United States highway shield, itself based on the Great Seal of the United States.

== Support ==
AFL Hall of Fame coach Hank Stram supported the idea and used the patch as a motivating factor for his team. Stram was later quoted as saying "You could not believe it when you saw the faces of the players. These were great men, and great pros, but they were like kids in a candy shop when they saw that patch." Years later, Chiefs linebacker Willie Lanier remarked "It lit us up. We knew what it meant." Wearing the AFL patch, the Chiefs went out and defeated the Vikings 23–7. The AFL-NFL Championship Game's final record was NFL 2, AFL 2, showing that the upstart American Football League could capably compete with the established NFL.

== Legacy ==
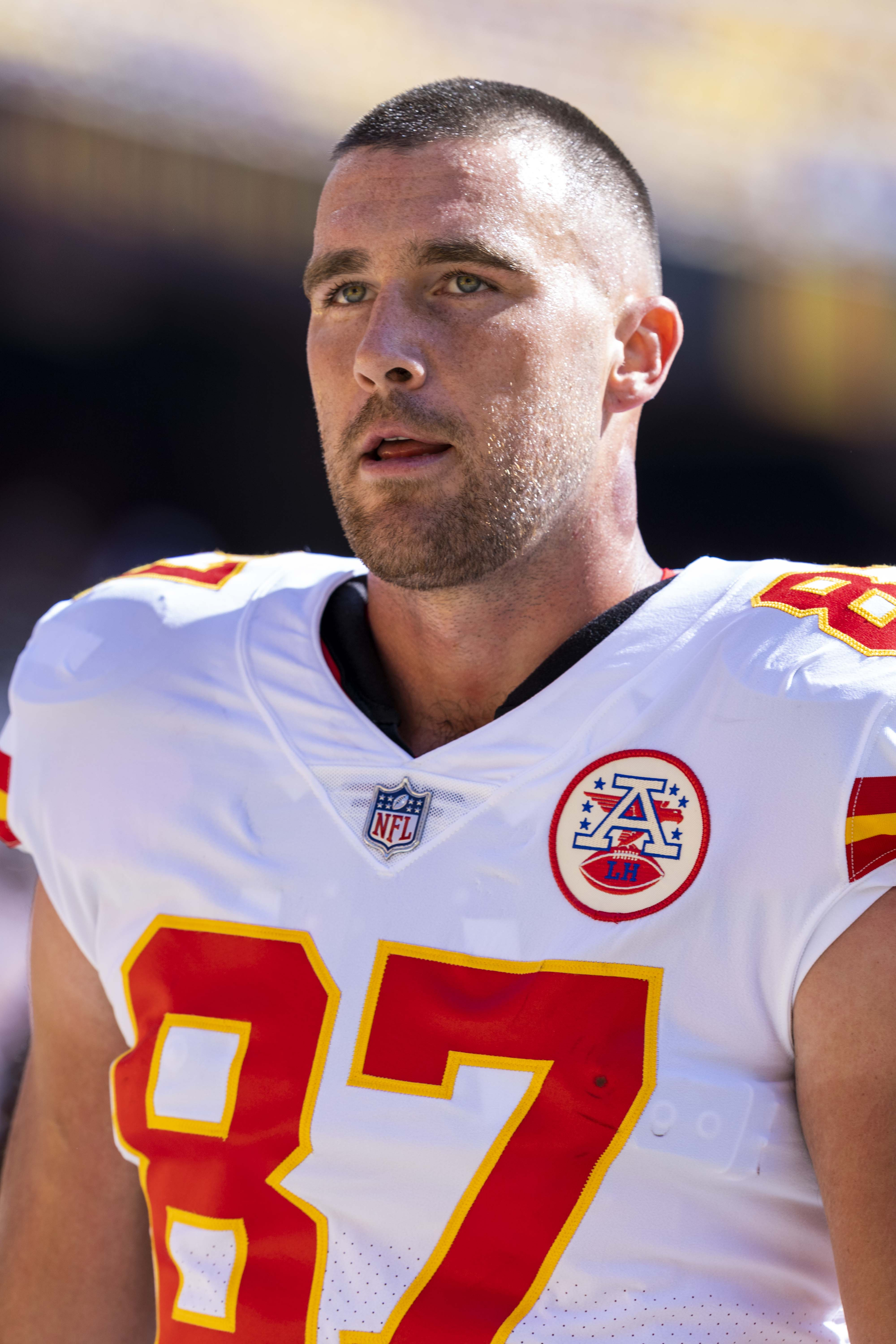
Chiefs tight end Travis Kelce, pictured in 2021, in uniform with a Lamar Hunt memorial patch on his left side inspired by the Ten-Year AFL Patch.

After Hunt's death in 2007, a modified version of the AFL patch, this time rendered as a disc instead of a federal shield, and with his "LH" initials replacing the "AFL" letters on the football, became a permanent part of the Chiefs uniform on its left side as a memorial to the league and the team's founding owner, along with being an icon within the end zones of Arrowhead Stadium to identify the team's conference, replacing the post-merger AFC logo used by the league until 2009.
