= Amy Adams Strunk =

American sports team owner (born 1955)

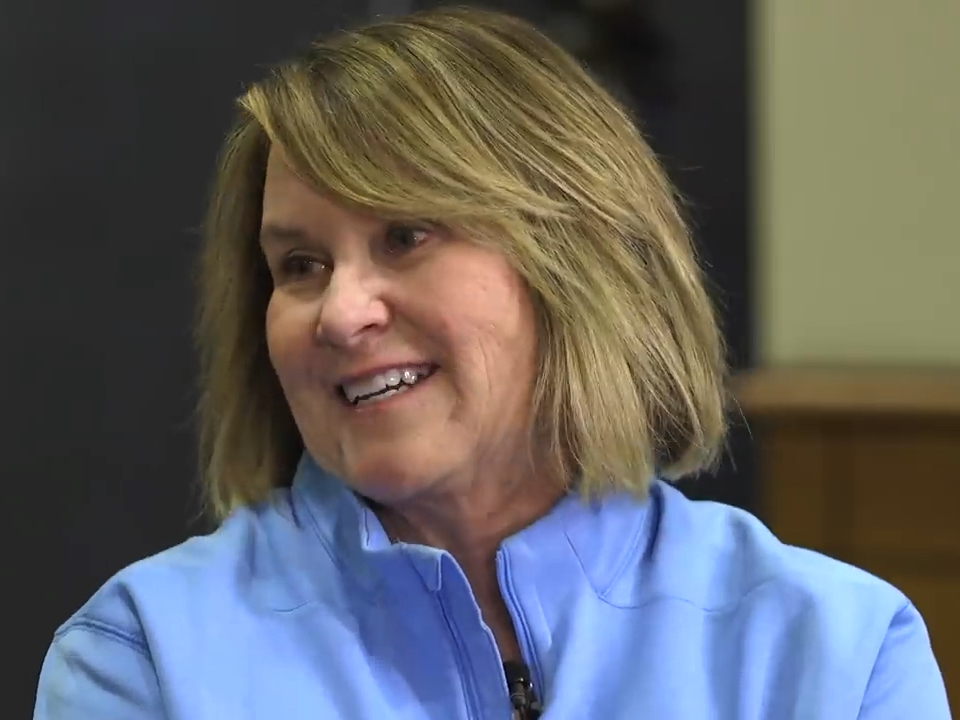
- Strunk in 2020
- Born: September 29, 1955 (age 71); Houston, Texas, U.S.
- Education: University of Texas at Austin
- Occupations: Controlling owner of the Tennessee Titans, co-chairman of board of directors
- Spouse: Bill Hunt
- Children: 3
- Football career

Tennessee Titans
- Title: Principal owner

Career history
- Tennessee Titans (2015–present) Principal owner

Amy Adams Strunk (born September 29, 1955) is an American businesswoman and controlling owner of the National Football League (NFL)'s Tennessee Titans. The daughter of the late owner Bud Adams, Strunk owns half of the Titans franchise, with Susan Lewis, the widow of her brother, and her sons Kenneth S. Adams IV and Barclay Adams owning the remaining half. The team is currently owned under the banner of KSA Industries, which also owns many of Bud Adams' businesses, including a controlling stake of Adams Resources & Energy. Before Strunk took over as controlling owner in 2015, the role belonged to her sister, Susie Adams Smith, whose husband Tommy Smith was team president and CEO.

== Early career ==
Strunk initially attended Pine Manor College but transferred after a year to the University of Texas at Austin, graduating with a degree in history. Born into a wealthy family of oil entrepreneurs and business executives, including ancestors K. S. "Boots" Adams and W. W. Keeler, Strunk is also involved with her family's other businesses, which includes Bud Adams Ranches, Inc., and is also the president of Kenada Fox Hounds, a fox-hunting organization, and the Little River Oil and Gas Company.

== Owner of the Titans ==
Strunk initially inherited a third of the Tennessee Titans on her father's death, with another third going to her sister, Susie Adams Smith, and the last third to be split equally between Susan Lewis, widow of their brother Kenneth S. Adams III (who died in 1987). Lewis's shares are equally split with her sons from that relationship, Kenneth S. Adams IV and Barclay Adams. Following two tumultuous years with Smith as controlling owner and her husband Tommy as the chairman, the family decided to pass the mantle down to Strunk.

Within a couple of years, Strunk and Kenneth IV hired longtime business partner Steve Underwood to replace Tommy Smith as team president and CEO and replaced general manager Ruston Webster with Jon Robinson. Strunk was the representing owner for the Titans during a 2015 league vote. In 2016, Strunk was appointed to the NFL's Hall of Fame committee, and was also named to the Board of Trustees for the Pro Football Hall of Fame. Due in large part to Strunk's organization of the Titans 2018 uniform reveal event in downtown Nashville, the NFL granted Nashville the honor of hosting the 2019 NFL draft. After bringing the Draft to Nashville, Adams was awarded the 2019 Tennessean of the Year by the Tennessee Sports Hall of Fame. On December 12, 2020, it was announced that Susie Adams Smith would sell her share of the Titans to the family-owned KSA Industries. This gives Amy Adams Strunk 50% share of the team, with the other 50% still owned by her nephews, Kenneth Adams IV and Barclay Adams, and Susan Lewis, their mother. Amy Adams Strunk retains controlling ownership. In addition, a league rule was imposed as a result of the impasse that owners file an annual succession plan that puts one person in charge of the team if the current principal owner dies or becomes incapacitated.

Unlike her father, who was described as a control-obsessed, reclusive figure in his waning days, Strunk and her nephew have taken a committee approach to making decisions, being more receptive to feedback from fans and the team's other shareholders. They also made more of an effort to market the team in Nashville, which they opined had been lacking after the Steve McNair era.

== Personal life ==
Strunk is an avid equestrian and fox hunter. Her first marriage ended in divorce in 1990, following a long period of depression that followed her brother's suicide. Her second husband, cattle breeder Tim Strunk, died in a 1997 auto accident. Her current husband Bill Hunt is a former commercial airline pilot. They have residences in Waller, Texas and Nashville, Tennessee. She has three grown children from two previous marriages.

Sporting positions
Preceded by Bud Adams	Tennessee Titans principal owner 2013–present	Incumbent
