= Adams Resources & Energy =

American energy company

Adams Resources and Energy, Inc.
- Type: Private
- Founded: 1947
- Founder: Bud Adams
- Headquarters: Houston, Texas
- Area served: Global
- Revenue: ▼$1.944 Billion (2015)
- Operating income: ▼$0.009 Billion (2015)
- Net income: ▼$-0.001 Billion (2015)
- Total assets: ▼$0.243 Billion (2015)
- Total equity: ▼$0.152 Billion (2015)
- Owner: GulfStar Group
- Number of employees: 809 (2016)
- Subsidiaries: Gulfmark Energy, Inc.
- Website: www.adamsresources.com

Adams Resources and Energy, Inc. is a company engaged in the marketing of crude oil, natural gas and liquid chemical products. Adams was founded by Kenneth Stanley "Bud" Adams Jr. in 1947, as the wildcatting firm ADA Oil Company It went public in 1974. Bud Adams served as the company's chief executive officer for more than half a century. The Company and its subsidiaries presently have over 800 employees.

The Company's GulfMark Energy, Inc. subsidiary is engaged in crude oil marketing, transportation, terminalling and storage in various crude oil and natural gas basins in the lower 48 states of the United States ("U.S.”) and arranges sales and deliveries to refiners and other customers. GulfMark purchases approximately 95,000 barrels per day at the wellhead. Adams has interests in 298 oil wells and it operates 42 of these.

The Company's Service Transport subsidiary transports liquid chemicals, pressurized gases, asphalt and dry bulk primarily in the lower 48 states of the U.S. with deliveries into Canada and Mexico, and with fifteen terminals across the U.S.
