= F. Wayne Valley =

American football owner

Francis Wayne Valley
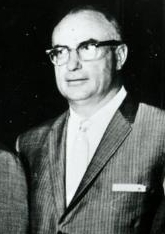
- Valley circa 1961

Personal information
- Born: March 28, 1914; Portland, Maine, U.S.
- Died: October 2, 1986 (aged 72); Piedmont, California, U.S.

Career information
- College: Oregon State University; University of Oregon

Career history
- Oakland Raiders (1961–1971) Principal owner & general manager

Francis Wayne Valley (March 28, 1914 – October 2, 1986) was an American businessman, philanthropist and football player. He attended Oregon State University in the 1930s, where he was a starting linebacker and fullback on the Oregon State Beavers football team, though he would ultimately graduate with a business degree from the University of Oregon due to OSU cutting his program of study. He would later go on to a successful career in the homebuilding industry, starting his first building business in the late 1940s. His businesses were based in the East Bay city of San Leandro, California, where he lived. He and his family later moved to Piedmont, California, in the late 1960s.

Valley was one of the original owners (along with Chet Soda, Donald Blessing and five other investors) of the Oakland Raiders football team, and a founding member of the American Football League. He took control of the franchise in 1960 and served as the managing general partner of the team with Ed McGah until forced out of this role by Al Davis in 1972. Valley subsequently sold his stake in 1976. Along with his wife, Gladys L. Valley, they left the majority of their net worth to the Wayne and Gladys Valley Foundation, based in Oakland, California.

Valley died in 1986 and his wife continued operating the Foundation until her death in 1998. Their daughter Tamara A. Valley chairs the foundation and on September 15, 2003, the board of directors unanimously decided to wind down the foundation and distribute about $1 billion USD in assets by 2018. The foundation is a key donor to OSU, both academically and athletically; Valley Library, Valley Gymnastics Center, Valley Football Center, and the Gladys Valley Marine Studies Building at OSU are all named in their honor.

The Valleys' foundation was also a major benefactor of the University of California, Berkeley, donating $64 million from 1989 to 2014. In 1989, the foundation gave Berkeley $15 million to support the renovation of the Valley Life Sciences Building, and in 2000, the foundation pledged another $25 million to advance biomedical and health sciences at the school. The foundation made a $10 million contribution to support the renovation of Berkeley's Bancroft Library in 2005, and it donated over $14 million during 2011 through 2014 to help fund the construction of the Li Ka Shing Center for Biomedical and Health Sciences.

In 2005, California State University, East Bay, in Hayward, California, launched an aggressive construction project with the building of three new facilities: the Wayne and Gladys Valley Business and Technology Center (VBT), the Pioneer Heights student housing expansion and the University Union annex. The 67,000-square-foot (6,200 m^{2}) Wayne and Gladys Valley Business and Technology Center was dedicated on February 28, 2007, making it the first new academic building on the Hayward Campus in over 30 years. The building houses programs in business, technology management, engineering, multimedia, science and online degree programs.

== See also ==
- List of American Football League players
