= Chet Soda =

American football owner

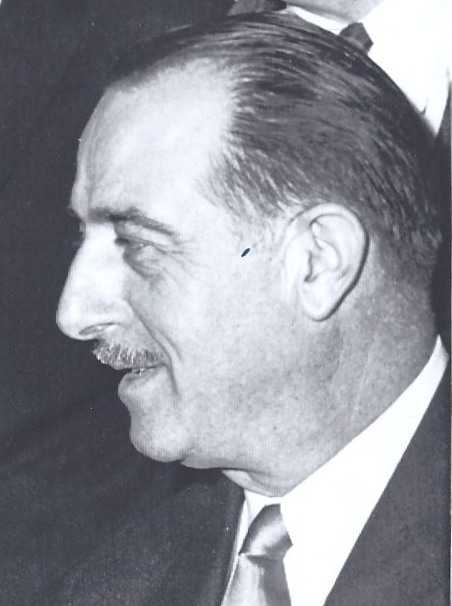
- Soda in 1960

Personal information
- Born: March 15, 1908; Oakland, California, U.S.
- Died: March 12, 1989 (aged 80); Oakland, California, U.S.

Career history
- Oakland Raiders (1960) Principal owner & general manager

Yster Charles "Chet" Soda (March 15, 1908 – March 12, 1989) was an American businessman who was the first general partner and general manager of the Oakland Raiders, an original franchise in the American Football League (AFL).

== Business ==
Soda was a contractor and land developer who operated A. Soda & Sons, a business begun by his father, and H & S Developers. He owned or managed a number of shopping centers in California as well as a trailer park and golf course. He also owned two ranches where he raised Hereford cattle and thoroughbred horses. Soda played a major role in the development of the Oakland-Alameda County Coliseum Complex and as a minority owner of the California Seals, was instrumental in the relocation of the team to Oakland.

== Oakland Raiders ==
Soda was one of eight founding partners in the Raiders, others including F. Wayne Valley and Donald Blessing. Soda was allegedly the source of the team's original name, the "Oakland Senors;" although Soda himself professed to prefer to name the team the "Oakland Mavericks." Whoever named the team apparently chose "Senors" as an inside joke reference to Soda, who was known for referring to his associates as "señor." The new name was subject to much ridicule in the press, with particular attention given to the misspelling of the plural of "señor" and to the lack of a tilde over the "n", and was overruled less than two weeks after it had been announced. Soda's involvement in the team was limited to its first year; immediately after the 1960 season, he resigned as general manager. Two weeks later, Valley, Ed McGah, and Robert Osbourne bought out Soda and the other partners' shares in the franchise.

== Government service ==
Soda was a member of the Oakland Board of Port Commissioners from 1969 to 1980 and the California Horse Racing Board from 1969 to 1977. He previously served on the board of directors of the Oakland Museum of California during its organization and construction.

== See also ==
- List of American Football League players
- Our Founders — Y & H Soda Foundation
- Soda Hall - University of California, Berkeley
