= Bud Adams =

American football executive, owner (1923–2013)

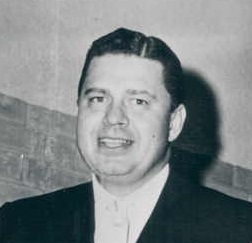
- Adams in 1964

Personal information
- Born: January 3, 1923; Bartlesville, Oklahoma, U.S.
- Died: October 21, 2013 (aged 90); Houston, Texas, U.S.

Career information
- College: Kansas (1942)

Career history
- Houston/Tennessee Oilers/Titans (1960–2013) Founder/Owner; Houston Mavericks (1967–1969) Founder/Owner; Nashville Kats (2005–2007) Founder/Owner

Awards and highlights
- 2× AFL champion (1960, 1961); Titans/Oilers Ring of Honor; Texas Sports Hall of Fame

Bud Adams
- Military career
- Allegiance: United States
- Branch: United States Navy
- Rank: Lieutenant, junior grade
- Conflicts: World War II: Pacific Theater

Kenneth Stanley "Bud" Adams Jr. (January 3, 1923 – October 21, 2013) was an American businessman who was the founder and owner of the Houston Oilers of the American Football League (AFL). The franchise eventually was moved to Nashville, where it was renamed the Tennessee Titans, a National Football League (NFL) franchise. A member of the Cherokee Nation who originally made his fortune in the petroleum business, Adams was chairman and CEO of Adams Resources & Energy Inc., a wholesale supplier of oil and natural gas. He was instrumental in the founding and establishment of the former American Football League (AFL).

Adams became a charter AFL owner with the establishment of the Oilers (now the "Titans"). He was the senior owner (by duration) with his team, now in the National Football League, a few months ahead of Buffalo Bills' owner Ralph Wilson. Adams also was one of the owners of the Houston Mavericks of the American Basketball Association (ABA) and the owner of the second Nashville Kats franchise of the Arena Football League (AFL). He was elected to the American Football League Hall of Fame, an online site, but as of 2026 is not a member of the Pro Football Hall of Fame, despite several nominations and an ongoing effort to make him such.

Adams had many other business interests in the Houston area, including owning several Lincoln-Mercury automobile franchises.

== Early life ==
Born in Bartlesville, Oklahoma on January 3, 1923, Adams was the son of K. S. "Boots" Adams and Blanch Keeler Adams. He was an enrolled member of the Cherokee Nation by virtue of his maternal line. Two of his great-grandmothers were Cherokee women who married European-American men: Nelson Carr and George B. Keeler, who played roles in trade and oil in early Oklahoma. Keeler drilled the first commercial oil well, near the Caney River.

Adams's father succeeded the founder Frank Phillips as president of Phillips Petroleum Company in 1939. Adams's uncle William Wayne Keeler, CEO of Phillips Petroleum Company for years, was appointed Principal Chief of the Cherokee Nation by U.S. President Harry S. Truman in 1949 and served through 1971, when the Cherokee were allowed to hold their own elections. Keeler was then democratically elected and served until 1975. Adams's ancestors include other prominent Cherokee leaders.

Adams graduated from Culver Military Academy in 1940 after lettering in three sports. After a brief stint at Menlo College, he transferred to the University of Kansas (KU), where he played briefly on the varsity football team as he completed an engineering degree. In his lone season on the Jayhawk football team, he was a teammate of politician Bob Dole.

== Sports career in Houston ==
=== Early career in the American Football League ===
Adams soon became interested in owning an NFL team.

=== The Houston Oilers and the Astrodome ===
Adams and the other AFL owners received a tremendous boost in credibility and net worth in 1966 with the merger of the AFL with and into the NFL. It was effective with the 1970 season. In 1968 Adams moved his team into the Astrodome, which since 1965 had been the home of the Houston Astros of baseball's National League (incidentally, Adams was one of the original part-owners of the team for the 1962 season).

==== Houston vs. Adams ====
By the mid-1990s, several NFL teams had new stadiums built largely or entirely with public funding, and several more deals had been agreed to. These new venues featured amenities such as "club seating" and other potential revenue streams that were not part of the NFL's default revenue-sharing arrangements. Due to this, Adams began to lobby Mayor Bob Lanier for a new stadium. However, Lanier turned down the request almost out of hand. Lanier knew that Houstonians were not willing to spend money for a brand-new stadium less than a decade after helping pay for heavily renovating the Astrodome. Following this, Adams began negotiations with the city of Nashville, Tennessee, and after the city approved plans to build what eventually became Nissan Stadium, he announced the Oilers would move to Nashville by 1998. The backlash was swift and immediate in Houston, as fan interest quickly dried up, to the point radio broadcasts would fall from being broadcast statewide to only flagship station KTRH and some stations in Tennessee (and even then, KTRH would drop games midway through in favor of pregame shows for Houston Rockets preseason games), and attendance would completely implode to the point on-field discussions between coaches and players could be heard from the stands, with the nadir coming in the final home game on December 15, 1996, a 21–13 loss to the Cincinnati Bengals that saw a disastrous attendance of just 15,131, a total that wouldn't even sell out a Rockets game at The Summit. Following this ordeal, the city, unwilling to endure this quagmire for another year, agreed to let Adams out of his lease a season early, and the team was officially gone from Houston.

== Sports career in Tennessee ==
The move up of the relocation would prove a blessing and a curse for the vagabond Oilers, as the team now needed a temporary home until the Nashville stadium was completed in 1999. With little options in Tennessee proper to temporarily hold the team (an idea to use Neyland Stadium was quickly mooted as the colossal 104,000 seats would make sellouts near-impossible, and Adams refused to use Vanderbilt Stadium because it lacked both skyboxes and alcohol licenses and seated just over 41,000, not enough to meet NFL stadium standards), Adams thus decided to use Liberty Bowl Memorial Stadium in Memphis for the following 2 seasons.

Despite the problems, Adams initially intended to stick it out. However, only one game, the finale against the Pittsburgh Steelers, attracted a larger crowd than could have been accommodated at Vanderbilt. Although 50,677 people showed up, the crowd appeared to be composed of at least half, and as many as three-fourths, Steeler fans, leading Adams to begrudingly move the franchise to Vanderbilt Stadium for 1998.

Adams was fined $250,000 by the NFL for this act of displaying an obscene gesture at the Titans/Bills game on November 15, 2009.

On November 15, 2009, Adams was caught on video displaying an obscene gesture towards the Buffalo bench after the Titans routed the Bills 41–14. Commissioner Roger Goodell, who happened to be attending the game, fined him $250,000. Afterwards, Adams remarked "Oh, I knew I was going to get in trouble for that. I was just so happy we won."

== Personal life ==
Adams was an enrolled member of the Cherokee Nation. He had served on the executive committee of the Cherokee National Historical Society.

He attended River Oaks Baptist Church in Houston. He and his wife Nancy Neville Adams were married for 62 years, until her death in February 2009 at the age of 84. They had two daughters, Susan and Amy, and a son, Kenneth S. Adams III, each of whom (and their children) are registered Cherokee. Kenneth S. Adams III died in June 1987 at the age of 29 from apparent suicide, leaving behind wife Susan Lewis and two young children, Kenneth S. Adams IV and Barclay Adams. As of 2020, when Susan Adams Smith sold her stake in the Titans, the team is owned with Amy owning 50% and Susan Lewis owning the other 50%, which is split equally with her sons.

Even after moving the Oilers to Tennessee, Adams continued to live in Houston and opted to commute from Texas rather than buying a residence in Nashville.

=== Death ===
Adams died of natural causes at his home in Houston at age 90 in 2013. His body was found in his River Oaks home after police were called for a welfare check.

At the time of his death, Adams's 409 wins were the most of any current NFL owner. He gained his 400th career victory in the 2011 season finale when his Titans defeated the team which replaced his Oilers in Houston, the Texans. His franchise made 21 playoff appearances in 53 seasons, eighth among NFL teams since 1960. In championship game appearances, his team reached the AFL Championship four times (1960–1962, 1967) and the AFC Championship Game four times (1978, 1979, 1999, 2002) with just one Super Bowl appearance (1999).

Sporting positions
New creation	Houston/Tennessee Oilers/Titans principal owner 1960–2013	Succeeded by Amy Adams Strunk
