= American Football League =

League that merged with the NFL in 1970

- Most recent season or competition: 1969 American Football League season
- Sport: American football
- Founded: August 14, 1959; 67 years ago
- First season: 1960
- Folded: February 1, 1970; 56 years ago, merged with NFL as AFC
- No. of teams: 8 (1960–1965), 9 (1966–1967), 10 (1968–1970)
- Country: United States
- Last champion: Kansas City Chiefs
- Most titles: Dallas Texans / Kansas City Chiefs (3)

The American Football League (AFL) was a major professional American football league that operated for ten seasons from 1960 until 1970, when it merged with the older National Football League (NFL) and became that league's American Football Conference (AFC). The upstart AFL operated in direct competition with the more established NFL throughout its existence. It was more successful than earlier rivals to the NFL, including not only the organizations founded under the AFL name in 1926, 1936, and 1940, but also the later All-America Football Conference (AAFC), which existed between 1944 and 1950 but conducted operations only between 1946 and 1949.

This fourth version of the AFL was the most successful, created by a number of owners who had been refused NFL expansion franchises or had minority shares of NFL teams. The AFL's original lineup consisted of eight clubs — the Boston Patriots, Buffalo Bills, Dallas Texans, Denver Broncos, Houston Oilers, Los Angeles Chargers, Titans of New York, and Oakland Raiders. The Patriots, Bills, Oilers, and Titans comprised the league's Eastern Division, while the Texans, Broncos, Chargers, and Raiders made up its Western Division. The league first gained attention by signing 75% of the NFL's first-round draft choices in 1960, including Houston's successful signing of college football star and Heisman Trophy winner Billy Cannon.

While the AFL's first years saw uneven competition and low attendance, the league was buttressed by a generous television contract with the American Broadcasting Company (ABC), followed by a contract with the competing National Broadcasting Company (NBC) for games starting with the 1965 season, that broadcast the more offense-oriented football league nationwide. By continuing to attract top talent from colleges and the NFL by the mid-1960s, as well as successful franchise shifts of the Chargers from Los Angeles to San Diego and the Texans from Dallas to Kansas City (becoming the Kansas City Chiefs), the AFL established a dedicated following. The transformation of the struggling Titans into the New York Jets under new ownership, including the signing of University of Alabama star quarterback Joe Namath, further solidified the league's reputation among the major media.

As fierce competition made player salaries skyrocket in both the AFL and NFL, especially after a series of "raids" where the leagues signed players who were "under contract" with teams in the rival league, the AFL and NFL agreed to a merger in 1966. Among the merger conditions were a common draft and a championship game played between the two league champions, first played in early 1967, which would eventually become known as the Super Bowl. The AFL and NFL continued to operate as separate leagues until 1970, with separate regular season and playoff schedules except for the championship game. NFL Commissioner Pete Rozelle also became chief executive of the AFL from July 26, 1966, through the completion of the merger. During this time, the AFL expanded, adding the Miami Dolphins and Cincinnati Bengals. After losses by the Chiefs and Raiders to the NFL champion Green Bay Packers in the first two AFL–NFL World Championship Games, the Jets and Chiefs won Super Bowls III and IV, respectively, cementing the league's claim to being an equal to the NFL.

In 1970, the NFL absorbed the AFL. The ten former AFL franchises joined three existing NFL teams — the Baltimore Colts, Cleveland Browns, and Pittsburgh Steelers — to form the merged league's American Football Conference (AFC).

== History ==
During the 1950s, the National Football League had grown to rival Major League Baseball as one of the most popular professional sports leagues in the United States. One franchise that did not share in this newfound success of the league was the Chicago Cardinals – owned by the Bidwill family – who had become overshadowed by the more popular Chicago Bears. The Bidwills hoped to move their franchise, preferably to St. Louis, but could not come to terms with the league, which demanded money before it would approve the move. Needing cash, the Bidwills began entertaining offers from would-be investors, and one of the men who approached the Bidwills was Lamar Hunt, son and heir of millionaire oilman H. L. Hunt. Hunt offered to buy the Cardinals and move them to Dallas, where he had grown up. However, these negotiations came to nothing, since the Bidwills insisted on retaining a controlling interest in the franchise and were unwilling to move their team to a city where a previous NFL franchise had failed in 1952. While Hunt negotiated with the Bidwills, similar offers were made by Bud Adams, Bob Howsam, and Max Winter.

When Hunt, Adams, and Howsam were unable to secure a controlling interest in the Cardinals, they approached NFL commissioner Bert Bell and proposed the addition of expansion teams. Bell, wary of expanding the 12-team league and risking its newfound success, rejected the offer. On his return flight to Dallas, Hunt conceived the idea of an entirely new league and decided to contact the others who had shown interest in purchasing the Cardinals. In addition to Adams, Howsam, and Winter, Hunt reached out to Bill Boyer, Winter's business partner, to gauge their interest in starting a new league. Hunt's first meeting with Adams was held in March 1959. Hunt, who felt a regional rivalry would be critical for the success of the new league, convinced Adams to join and found his team in Houston. Hunt next secured an agreement from Howsam to bring a team to Denver.

After Winter and Boyer agreed to start a team in Minneapolis-Saint Paul, the new league had its first four teams. Hunt then approached Willard Rhodes, who hoped to bring pro football to Seattle. However, not wanting to undermine its own brand, the University of Washington was unwilling to let the fledgling league use Husky Stadium, and Rhodes' effort came to nothing (Seattle would later get a pro football team of its own in 1974 some time after the AFL-NFL merger during the construction of the Kingdome and began play in 1976). Hunt also sought franchises in Los Angeles, Buffalo and New York City. During the summer of 1959, he sought the blessings of the NFL for his nascent league, as he did not seek a potentially costly rivalry. Within weeks of the July 1959 announcement of the league's formation, Hunt received commitments from Barron Hilton and Harry Wismer to bring teams to Los Angeles and New York, respectively. His initial efforts for Buffalo, however, were rebuffed, when Hunt's first choice of owner, Pat McGroder, declined to take part; McGroder had hoped that the threat of the AFL would be enough to prompt the NFL to expand to Buffalo.

On August 14, 1959, the first league meeting was held in Chicago, and charter memberships were given to Dallas, New York, Houston, Denver, Los Angeles, and Minneapolis-Saint Paul. On August 22, the league officially was named the American Football League at a meeting in Dallas. The NFL's initial reaction was not as openly hostile as it had been with the earlier All-America Football Conference (AAFC), as Bell had even given his public approval; but he died suddenly in October 1959, and individual NFL owners soon began a campaign to undermine the new league. AFL owners were approached with promises of new NFL franchises or ownership stakes in existing ones. Only the party from Minneapolis-Saint Paul accepted, and with the addition of Ole Haugsrud and Bernie Ridder the Minnesota group joined the NFL in 1961 as the Minnesota Vikings. The older league also announced on August 29 that it had conveniently reversed its position against expansion, and planned to bring new NFL teams to Houston and Dallas, to start play in 1961. (The NFL did not expand to Houston at that time; the promised Dallas team – the Dallas Cowboys – actually started play in 1960, and the Vikings began play in 1961.) Finally, the NFL quickly came to terms with the Bidwills and allowed them to relocate the struggling Cardinals to St. Louis, eliminating that city as a potential AFL market.

Ralph Wilson, who owned a minority interest in the NFL's Detroit Lions at the time, initially announced he was placing a team in Miami, but like the Seattle situation, was also rebuffed by local ownership (like Seattle, Miami would later get a pro football team of its own as well); given five other choices, Wilson negotiated with McGroder and brought the team that became the Bills to Buffalo. Buffalo was officially awarded its franchise on October 28. During a league meeting on November 22, a 10-man ownership group from Boston (led by Billy Sullivan) was awarded the AFL's eighth team. On November 30, 1959, Joe Foss, a World War II Marine fighter ace and former governor of South Dakota, was named the AFL's first commissioner. Foss commissioned a friend of Harry Wismer's to develop the AFL's eagle-on-football logo. Hunt was elected President of the AFL on January 26, 1960.

=== The AFL draft ===
The AFL's first draft took place the same day Boston was awarded its franchise, and lasted 33 rounds. The league held a second draft on December 2, which lasted for 20 rounds. Because the Oakland Raiders joined after the initial AFL drafts, they inherited Minnesota's selections. A special allocation draft was held in January 1960, to allow the Raiders to stock their team, as some of the other AFL teams had already signed some of Minneapolis' original draft choices.

=== Crisis and success (1960–1961) ===
In November 1959, Minneapolis-Saint Paul owner Max Winter announced his intent to leave the AFL to accept a franchise offer from the NFL. In 1961, his team began play in the NFL as the Minnesota Vikings. Los Angeles Chargers owner Barron Hilton demanded that a replacement for Minnesota be placed in California, to reduce his team's operating costs and to create a rivalry. After a brief search, Oakland was chosen and an ownership group led by F. Wayne Valley and local real estate developer Chet Soda was formed. After initially being called the Oakland Señors, the rechristened Oakland Raiders officially joined the AFL on January 30, 1960.

The AFL's first major success came when the Houston Oilers signed Billy Cannon, the All-American and 1959 Heisman Trophy winner from LSU. Cannon signed a $100,000 contract to play for the Oilers, despite having already signed a $50,000 contract with the NFL's Los Angeles Rams. The Oilers filed suit and claimed that Rams general manager Pete Rozelle had unduly manipulated Cannon. The court upheld the Houston contract, and with Cannon the Oilers appeared in the AFL's first three championship games (winning two).

On June 9, 1960, the league signed a five-year television contract with ABC, which brought in revenues of approximately $2.125 million per year for the entire league. On June 17, the AFL filed an antitrust lawsuit against the NFL, which was dismissed in 1962 after a two-month trial. The AFL began regular-season play (a night game on Friday, September 9, 1960) with eight teams in the league – the Boston Patriots, Buffalo Bills, Dallas Texans, Denver Broncos, Houston Oilers, Los Angeles Chargers, Titans of New York, and Oakland Raiders. Raiders' co-owner Wayne Valley dubbed the AFL ownership "The Foolish Club", a term Lamar Hunt subsequently used on team photographs he sent as Christmas gifts.

The Oilers became the first-ever league champions by defeating the Chargers, 24–16, in the AFL Championship on January 1, 1961. Attendance for the 1960 season was respectable for a new league, but not nearly that of the NFL. In 1960, the NFL averaged attendance of more than 40,000 fans per game and more popular NFL teams in 1960 regularly saw attendance figures in excess of 50,000 per game, while Canadian Football League (CFL) attendances averaged approximately 20,000 per game. By comparison, AFL attendance averaged about 16,500 per game and generally hovered between 10,000 and 20,000 per game. Professional football was still primarily a gate-driven business in 1960, so low attendance meant financial losses. The Raiders, with a league-worst average attendance of just 9,612, lost $500,000 in their first year and only survived after receiving a $400,000 loan from Bills owner Ralph Wilson. In an early sign of stability, however, the AFL did not lose any teams after its first year of operation. In fact, the only major change was the Chargers' move from Los Angeles to nearby San Diego (they would return to Los Angeles in 2017).

On August 8, 1961, the AFL challenged the CFL to an exhibition game that would feature the Hamilton Tiger-Cats and the Buffalo Bills, which was attended by 24,376 spectators. Playing at Civic Stadium in Hamilton, Ontario, the Tiger-Cats defeated the Bills 38–21 playing a mix of AFL and CFL rules.

=== Movement and instability (1962–1963) ===
While the Oilers found instant success in the AFL, other teams did not fare as well. The Oakland Raiders and Titans of New York struggled on and off the field during their first few seasons in the league. Oakland's eight-man ownership group was reduced to just three in 1961, after heavy financial losses in their first season. Attendance for home games was poor, partly due to the team playing in the San Francisco Bay Area—which already had an established NFL team (the San Francisco 49ers)—but the product on the field was also to blame. After winning six games in their debut season, the Raiders won a total of three times in the 1961 and 1962 seasons. Oakland took part in a 1961 supplemental draft meant to boost the weaker teams in the league, but it did little good. They participated in another such draft in 1962.

The Titans fared a little better on the field but had their own financial troubles. Attendance was so low for home games that team owner Harry Wismer had fans move to seats closer to the field to give the illusion of a fuller stadium on television. Eventually Wismer could no longer afford to meet his payroll, and on November 8, 1962, the AFL took over operations of the team. The Titans were sold to a five-person ownership group headed by Sonny Werblin on March 28, 1963, and in April the new owners changed the team's name to the New York Jets.

The Raiders and Titans both finished last in their divisions in the 1962 season. The Texans and Oilers, winners of their divisions, faced each other for the 1962 AFL Championship on December 23. The Texans dethroned the two-time champion Oilers, 20–17, in a double-overtime contest that was, at the time, professional football's longest-ever game.

In 1963, the Texans became the second AFL team to relocate. Lamar Hunt felt that despite winning the league championship in 1962, the Texans could not sufficiently profit in the same market as the Dallas Cowboys, which entered the NFL as an expansion franchise in 1960. After meetings with New Orleans, Atlanta, and Miami, Hunt announced on May 22 that the Texans' new home would be Kansas City, Missouri. Kansas City mayor Harold Roe Bartle (nicknamed "Chief") was instrumental in his city's success in attracting the team. Partly to honor Bartle, the franchise officially became the Kansas City Chiefs on May 26.

The San Diego Chargers, under head coach Sid Gillman, won a decisive 51–10 victory over the Boston Patriots for the 1963 AFL Championship. Confident that his team was capable of beating that season's NFL champion Chicago Bears (he had the Chargers' rings inscribed with the phrase "World Champions"), Gillman approached NFL Commissioner Pete Rozelle and proposed a final championship game between the two teams. Rozelle declined the offer; however, the game would be instituted three seasons later.

=== Watershed years (1964–1965) ===
A series of events throughout the next few years demonstrated the AFL's ability to achieve a greater level of equality with the NFL. On January 29, 1964, the AFL signed a lucrative $36 million television contract with NBC (beginning in the 1965 season), which gave the league money it needed to compete with the NFL for players. Pittsburgh Steelers owner Art Rooney was quoted as saying to NFL Commissioner Pete Rozelle after receiving the news of the AFL's new TV deal that, "They don't have to call us 'Mister' anymore". A single-game attendance record was set on November 8, 1964, when 61,929 fans packed Shea Stadium to watch the New York Jets and Buffalo Bills.

The bidding war for players between the AFL and NFL escalated in 1965. The Chiefs drafted University of Kansas star Gale Sayers in the first round of the 1965 AFL draft (held November 28, 1964), while the Chicago Bears did the same in the NFL draft. Sayers eventually signed with the Bears. A similar situation occurred when the New York Jets and the NFL's St. Louis Cardinals both drafted University of Alabama quarterback Joe Namath. In what was viewed as a key victory for the AFL, Namath signed a $427,000 contract with the Jets on January 2, 1965 (the deal included a new car). It was the highest amount of money ever paid to a collegiate football player, and is cited as the strongest contributing factor to the eventual merger between the two leagues.

After the 1963 season, the Newark Bears of the Atlantic Coast Football League expressed interest in joining the AFL; concerns over having to split the New York metro area with the still-uncertain Jets were a factor in the Bears' bid being rejected. In 1965, Milwaukee officials tried to lure an expansion team to play at Milwaukee County Stadium where the Green Bay Packers had played parts of their home schedule after an unsuccessful attempt to lure the Packers there full-time, but Packers head coach Vince Lombardi invoked the team's exclusive lease, and additionally, signed an extension to keep some home games in Milwaukee until 1976.

In June 1965, the AFL awarded its first expansion team to Cox Broadcasting of Atlanta. The NFL quickly counteroffered insurance executive Rankin Smith a franchise, which he accepted; the Atlanta Falcons began play as an NFL franchise for the 1966 season. In March 1965, Joe Robbie had met with Commissioner Foss to inquire about an expansion franchise for Miami. On May 6, Robbie secured an agreement with Miami mayor Robert King High to bring a team to Miami. League expansion was approved at a meeting held on June 7, and on August 16 the AFL's ninth franchise was officially awarded to Robbie and entertainer Danny Thomas. The Miami Dolphins joined the league for a fee of $7.5 million and started play in the AFL's Eastern Division in 1966. The AFL also planned to add two more teams by 1967.

=== Escalation and merger (1966–1967) ===
In 1966, the rivalry between the AFL and NFL reached an all-time peak. On April 7, Joe Foss resigned as AFL commissioner. His successor was Oakland Raiders head coach and general manager Al Davis, who had been instrumental in turning around the fortunes of that franchise. That following May, Wellington Mara, owner of the NFL's New York Giants, broke a "gentleman's agreement" against signing another league's players and lured kicker Pete Gogolak away from the AFL's Buffalo Bills. In response to the Gogolak signing and no longer content with trying to outbid the NFL for college talent, the AFL under Davis began to also recruit players already on NFL squads. Davis's strategy focused on quarterbacks in particular, and in two months he persuaded seven NFL quarterbacks to sign with the AFL. Although Davis's intention was to help the AFL win the bidding war, some AFL and NFL owners saw the escalation as detrimental to both leagues. Alarmed with the rate of spending in the league, Hilton Hotels forced Barron Hilton to relinquish his stake in the Chargers as a condition of maintaining his leadership role with the hotel chain.

The same month Davis was named commissioner, several NFL owners, headed by Dallas Cowboys general manager Tex Schramm, secretly approached Lamar Hunt and other AFL owners and started negotiations with the AFL to merge. A series of secret meetings commenced in Dallas to discuss the concerns of both leagues over rapidly increasing player salaries, as well as the practice of player poaching. Hunt and Schramm completed the basic groundwork for a merger of the two leagues by the end of May, and on June 8, 1966, the merger was officially announced. Under the terms of the agreement, the two leagues would hold a common player draft. The agreement also called for a title game to be played between the champions of the respective leagues. The two leagues would be fully merged by 1970, NFL commissioner Pete Rozelle would remain as commissioner of the merged league, which would be named the NFL. Additional expansion teams would eventually be awarded by 1970 or soon thereafter to bring it to a 28-team league. (The additional expansion would not happen until 1976.) The AFL also agreed to have the Oakland Raiders and the New York Jets pay indemnities of $18 million to the San Francisco 49ers and the New York Giants of the NFL over 20 years. In protest, Davis resigned as AFL commissioner on July 25 rather than remain until the completion of the merger, and Milt Woodard was named president of the AFL, with the "commissioner" title vacated because of Rozelle's expanded role.

On January 15, 1967, the first-ever championship game between the two separate professional football leagues, the "AFL-NFL World Championship Game" (retroactively referred to as Super Bowl I), was played in Los Angeles. After a close first half, the NFL champion Green Bay Packers overwhelmed the AFL champion Kansas City Chiefs, 35–10. The loss reinforced for many the notion that the AFL was an inferior league. Packers head coach Vince Lombardi stated after the game, "I do not think they are as good as the top teams in the National Football League."

The second AFL-NFL Championship (Super Bowl II) yielded a similar result. The Oakland Raiders—who had easily beaten the Houston Oilers to win their first AFL championship—were overmatched by the Packers, 33–14. The more experienced Packers capitalized on a number of Raiders miscues and never trailed. Green Bay defensive tackle Henry Jordan offered a compliment to Oakland and the AFL, when he said, "... the AFL is becoming much more sophisticated on offense. I think the league has always had good personnel, but the blocks were subtler and better conceived in this game."

The AFL added its tenth and final team on May 24, 1967, when it awarded the league's second expansion franchise to an ownership group from Cincinnati, Ohio, headed by NFL legend Paul Brown. Although Brown had intended to join the NFL, he agreed to join the AFL when he learned that his team would be included in the NFL once the merger was completed. The league's last expansion team, the Cincinnati Bengals began play in the 1968 season, finishing last in the Western Division.

=== Legitimacy and the end of an era (1968–1970) ===
While many AFL players and observers believed their league was the equal of the NFL, their first two Super Bowl performances did nothing to prove it. However, on November 17, 1968, when NBC cut away from a game between the Jets and Raiders to air the children's movie Heidi, the ensuing uproar helped disprove the notion that fans still considered the AFL an inferior product. The perception of AFL inferiority forever changed on January 12, 1969, when the AFL champion New York Jets shocked the heavily favored NFL champion Baltimore Colts in Super Bowl III. The Colts, who entered the contest favored by as many as 18 points, had completed the 1968 NFL season with a 13–1 record, and won the NFL title with a convincing 34–0 win over the Cleveland Browns. Led by their stalwart defense—which allowed a record-low 144 points—the 1968 Colts were considered one of the best-ever NFL teams.

By contrast, the Jets had allowed 280 points, the highest total for any division winner in the two leagues. They had also only narrowly beaten the favored Oakland Raiders 27–23 in the AFL championship game. Jets quarterback Joe Namath recalled that in the days leading up to the game, he grew increasingly angry when told New York had no chance to beat Baltimore. Three days before the game, a frustrated Namath responded to a heckler at the Touchdown Club in Miami by declaring, "We're going to win Sunday, I guarantee it!"

Namath and the Jets made good on his guarantee as they held the Colts scoreless until late in the fourth quarter. The Jets won, 16–7, in what is considered one of the greatest upsets in American sports history. With the win, the AFL finally achieved parity with the NFL and legitimized the merger of the two leagues. That notion was reinforced one year later in Super Bowl IV, when the AFL champion Kansas City Chiefs upset the NFL champion Minnesota Vikings, 23–7, in the last championship game to be played between the two leagues. The Vikings, favored by 12½ points, were held to just 67 rushing yards.

The last game in AFL history was the AFL All-Star Game, held in Houston's Astrodome on January 17, 1970, six days after Super Bowl IV. The Western All-Stars, led by Chargers quarterback John Hadl, defeated the Eastern All-Stars, 26–3. Buffalo rookie running back O. J. Simpson carried the ball for the last play in AFL history. Hadl was named the game's Most Valuable Player. The AFL ceased to exist as an unincorporated organization on February 1, 1970, when the NFL granted 10 new franchises and issued a new constitution.

Prior to the start of the 1970 NFL season, the merged league was organized into two conferences of three divisions each. All ten AFL teams made up the bulk of the new American Football Conference. To avoid having an inequitable number of teams in each conference, the leagues voted to move three NFL teams to the AFC. Motivated by the prospect of an intrastate rivalry with the Bengals as well as by personal animosity toward Paul Brown, Cleveland Browns owner Art Modell quickly offered to include his team in the AFC. He helped persuade the Pittsburgh Steelers (the Browns' archrivals) and Baltimore Colts (who shared the Baltimore-Washington market with the Washington Redskins) to follow suit, and each team received US$3 million to make the switch. The remaining 13 NFL teams became part of the National Football Conference.

Pro Football Hall of Fame receiver Charlie Joiner, who started his career with the Houston Oilers in 1969, was the last AFL player active in professional football, retiring after the 1986 season, when he played for the San Diego Chargers.

== Legacy ==
=== Overview ===
The American Football League stands as the only professional traditional outdoor football league to successfully compete against the NFL. When the two leagues merged in 1970, all ten AFL franchises and their statistics became part of the new NFL. Every other professional league that had competed against the NFL before the AFL–NFL merger had folded completely: the three previous leagues named "American Football League" and the All-America Football Conference (AAFC). From an earlier AFL (1936–1937), only the Cleveland Rams (now the Los Angeles Rams) joined the NFL and are currently operating, as are the Cleveland Browns and the San Francisco 49ers from the AAFC. A third AAFC team, the Baltimore Colts (not related to the 1953–1983 Baltimore Colts or to the current Indianapolis Colts franchise), played only one year in the NFL, disbanding at the end of the 1950 season. The league resulting from the merger was a 26-team juggernaut (since expanded to 32) with television rights covering all of the Big Three television networks (and since the 1990s, the newer Fox network) and teams in close proximity to almost all of the top 40 metropolitan areas, a fact that has precluded any other competing league from gaining traction since the merger; failed attempts to mimic the AFL's success included the World Football League (1974–75), United States Football League (1983–85), the United Football League (2009–2012) and the AAF (2019), and two iterations of the XFL (2001 and 2020), in addition to the NFL-backed and created World League of American Football (1991–92).

The AFL was also the most successful of numerous upstart leagues of the 1960s and 1970s that attempted to challenge a major professional league's dominance. All nine teams that were in the AFL at the time the merger was agreed upon were accepted into the league intact (as was the tenth team added between the time of the merger's agreement and finalization), and none of the AFL's teams have ever folded. For comparison, the World Hockey Association (1972–79) managed to have four of its six remaining teams merged into the National Hockey League, which actually caused the older league to contract a franchise, but WHA teams were forced to disperse the majority of their rosters and restart as expansion teams. The merged WHA teams were also not financially sound (in large part from the hefty expansion fees the NHL imposed on them), and three of the four were forced to relocate within 20 years. Like the WHA, the American Basketball Association (1967–76) also managed to have only four of its teams merged into the National Basketball Association, and the rest of the league was forced to fold following a troubled final season of existence. Both the WHA and ABA lost several teams to financial insolvency over the course of their existences. The Continental League, a proposed third league for Major League Baseball that was to begin play in 1961, never played a single game, largely because MLB responded to the proposal by expanding to four of that league's proposed cities. Historically, the only other professional sports league in the United States to exhibit a comparable level of franchise stability from its inception was the American League of Major League Baseball, which made its debut in the early 20th century and later prompted the National League to allow for competition with the American League to eventually result in the modern-day MLB.

=== Rule changes ===
The NFL adopted some of the innovations introduced by the AFL immediately and a few others in the years following the merger. One was including the names on player jerseys. The older league also adopted the practice of using the stadium scoreboard clocks to keep track of the official game time, instead of just having a stopwatch used by the referee. The AFL played a 14-game schedule for its entire existence, starting in 1960. The NFL, which had played a 12-game schedule since 1947, changed to a 14-game schedule in 1961, a year after the American Football League instituted it. The AFL also introduced the two-point conversion to professional football 34 years before the NFL instituted it in 1994 (college football had adopted the two-point conversion in the late 1950s). All of these innovations pioneered by the AFL, including its more exciting style of play and colorful uniforms, have essentially made today's professional football more like the AFL than like the old-line NFL. The AFL's challenge to the NFL also laid the groundwork for the Super Bowl, which has become the standard for championship contests in the United States of America.

=== Television ===
The NFL also adapted how the AFL used the growing power of televised football games, which were bolstered with the help of major network contracts (first with ABC, later with NBC after the latter network lost NFL rights to CBS). With that first contract with ABC, the AFL adopted the first-ever cooperative television plan for professional football, in which the proceeds were divided equally among member clubs. It featured many outstanding games, such as the classic 1962 double-overtime American Football League championship game between the Dallas Texans and the defending champion Houston Oilers. At the time it was the longest professional football championship game ever played. The AFL also appealed to fans by offering a flashier style of play (just like the ABA in basketball), compared to the more conservative game of the NFL. Long passes ("bombs") were commonplace in AFL offenses, led by such talented quarterbacks as John Hadl, Daryle Lamonica and Len Dawson.

Despite having a national television contract, the AFL often found itself trying to gain a foothold, only to come up against roadblocks. For example, CBS, which broadcast NFL games, ignored and did not report scores from the innovative AFL. While it has been alleged this snub was on orders from the NFL, it is more likely the arrangement was mutual due to the equally bitter rivalry between CBS and NBC. After the merger agreement was announced, CBS agreed to report AFL scores.

=== Expanding and reintroducing the sport to more cities ===
The AFL took advantage of the burgeoning popularity of football by locating teams in major cities that lacked NFL franchises. Hunt's vision not only brought a new professional football league to California and New York, but introduced the sport to Colorado, restored it to Texas and later to fast-growing Florida, as well as bringing it to Greater Boston for the first time in 12 years. Buffalo, having lost its original NFL franchise in 1929 and turned down by the NFL at least twice (1940 and 1950) for a replacement, returned to the NFL with the merger. The return of football to Kansas City was the first time that city had seen professional football since the NFL's Kansas City Blues of the 1920s; the arrival of the Chiefs, and the contemporary arrival of the St. Louis Football Cardinals, brought professional football back to Missouri for the first time since the temporary St. Louis Gunners of 1934.

In the case of the Dallas Cowboys, the NFL had long sought to return to the Dallas area after the Dallas Texans folded in 1952, but was originally met with strong opposition by Washington Redskins owner George Preston Marshall, who had enjoyed a monopoly as the only NFL team to represent the American South. Marshall later changed his position after future-Cowboys owner Clint Murchison Jr. bought the rights to Washington's fight song "Hail to the Redskins" and threatened to prevent Marshall from playing it at games. By then, the NFL wanted to quickly award the new Dallas franchise to Murchison so the team could immediately begin play and compete with the AFL's Texans. As a result, the Cowboys played its inaugural season in 1960 without the benefit of the NFL draft. The Texans eventually ceded Dallas to the Cowboys and became the Kansas City Chiefs.

As part of the merger agreement, additional expansion teams would be awarded by 1970 or soon thereafter to bring the league to 28 franchises; this requirement was fulfilled when the Seattle Seahawks and the Tampa Bay Buccaneers began play in 1976. In addition, had it not been for the existence of the Oilers from 1960 to 1996, the Houston Texans also would likely not exist today; the 2002 expansion team restored professional football in Houston after the original charter AFL member Oilers relocated to become the Tennessee Titans.

Kevin Sherrington of The Dallas Morning News has argued that the presence of AFL and the subsequent merger radically altered the fortunes of the Pittsburgh Steelers, saving the team "from stinking". Before the merger, the Steelers had long been one of the NFL's worst teams. Constantly lacking the money to build a quality team, the Steelers had only posted eight winning seasons, and just one playoff appearance, since their first year of existence in 1933 until the end of the 1969 season. They also finished with a 1–13 record in 1969, tied with the Chicago Bears for the worst record in the NFL. The $3 million indemnity that the Steelers received for joining the AFC with the rest of the former AFL teams after the merger helped them rebuild into a contender, drafting eventual Pro Football Hall of Famers like Terry Bradshaw and Joe Greene, and ultimately winning four Super Bowls in the 1970s. Since the 1970 merger, the Steelers have the NFL's highest winning percentage, the most total victories, the most trips to either conference championship game, are tied for the second most trips to the Super Bowl (tied with the Dallas Cowboys and Denver Broncos, trailing only the New England Patriots), and have won six Super Bowl championships, tied with the Patriots for the most in NFL history.

=== Effects on players ===
Perhaps the greatest social legacy of the AFL was the domino effect of its policy of being more liberal than the entrenched NFL in offering opportunity for black players. While the NFL was still emerging from thirty years of segregation influenced by Washington Redskins' owner George Preston Marshall, the AFL actively recruited from small and predominantly black colleges. The AFL's color-blindness led not only to the explosion of black talent on the field, but to the eventual entry of blacks into scouting, coordinating, and ultimately head coaching positions, long after the league merged itself out of existence.

The AFL's free agents came from several sources. Some were players who could not find success playing in the NFL, while another source was the then newly-formed Canadian Football League. In the late 1950s, many players released by the NFL, or un-drafted and unsigned out of college by the NFL, went north to try their luck with the CFL (which formed in 1958), and later returned to the states to play in the AFL.

In the league's first years, players such as Oilers' George Blanda, Chargers/Bills' Jack Kemp, Texans' Len Dawson, the Titans' Don Maynard, Raiders/Patriots/Jets' Babe Parilli, Pats' Bob Dee proved to be AFL standouts. Other players such as the Broncos' Frank Tripucka, the Pats' Gino Cappelletti, the Bills' Cookie Gilchrist and the Chargers' Tobin Rote, Sam DeLuca and Dave Kocourek also made their mark to give the league credibility. Rounding out this mix were the true "free agents", the walk-ons, who tried out for the chance to play professional American football.

After the AFL–NFL merger agreement in 1966, and after the AFL's Jets defeated an extremely strong Baltimore Colts team, a popular misconception fostered by the NFL and spread by media reports was that the AFL defeated the NFL because of the common draft instituted in 1967. This apparently was meant to assert that the AFL could not achieve parity as long as it had to compete with the NFL in the draft. But the 1968 Jets had less than a handful of "common draftees". Their stars were honed in the AFL, many of them since the Titans days.

Players who chose the AFL to develop their talent included Lance Alworth and Ron Mix of the Chargers, who had also been drafted by the NFL's San Francisco 49ers and Baltimore Colts respectively. Both eventually were elected to the Pro Football Hall of Fame after earning recognition during their careers as being among the best at their positions. Among specific teams, the 1964 Buffalo Bills stood out by holding their opponents to a pro football record 913 yards rushing on 300 attempts, while also recording fifty quarterback sacks in a 14-game schedule.

In 2009, a five-part series, Full Color Football: The History of the American Football League, on the Showtime Network, refuted many of the long-held misconceptions about the AFL. In it, Abner Haynes tells of how his father forbade him to accept being drafted by the NFL's Pittsburgh Steelers, after head coach Buddy Parker and quarterback Bobby Layne had visited the Haynes home drunk; the NFL Cowboys' Tex Schramm is quoted as saying that if his team had ever agreed to play the AFL's Dallas Texans, they would very likely have lost; George Blanda makes a case for more AFL players being inducted to the Pro Football Hall of Fame by pointing out that Hall of Famer Willie Brown was cut by the Houston Oilers because he couldn't cover Oilers flanker Charlie Hennigan in practice. Later, when Brown was with the Broncos, Hennigan needed nine catches in one game against the Broncos to break Lionel Taylor's professional football record of 100 catches in one season. Hennigan caught the nine passes and broke the record, even though he was covered by Brown.

=== Influence on professional football coaching ===
The AFL also spawned coaches whose style and techniques have profoundly affected the play of professional football to this day. In addition to AFL greats like Hank Stram, Lou Saban, Sid Gillman and Al Davis were eventual hall of fame coaches such as Bill Walsh, a protégé of Davis with the AFL Oakland Raiders for one season; and Chuck Noll, who worked for Gillman and the AFL LA/San Diego Chargers from 1960 through 1965. Others include Buddy Ryan (AFL's New York Jets), Chuck Knox (Jets), Walt Michaels (Jets), and John Madden (AFL's Oakland Raiders). Additionally, many prominent coaches began their pro football careers as players in the AFL, including Sam Wyche (Cincinnati Bengals), Marty Schottenheimer (Buffalo Bills), Wayne Fontes (Jets), and two-time Super Bowl winner Tom Flores (Oakland Raiders). Flores also has a Super Bowl ring as a player (1969 Kansas City Chiefs).

== Teams ==
Locations of AFL teams.

Division	Team	First season	Home stadium	AFL record (W-L-T)	AFL titles	Destiny after the merger
Eastern	Boston Patriots	1960	Nickerson Field (1960–1962), Fenway Park (1963–1968), Alumni Stadium (1969)	64–69–9	0	Still active in the Greater Boston area. Renamed as the New England Patriots in 1971.
Eastern	Buffalo Bills	1960	War Memorial Stadium (1960–1969)	67–71–6	2	Still active in the Buffalo–Niagara Falls metropolitan area.
Eastern	Houston Oilers	1960	Jeppesen Stadium (1960–1964), Rice Stadium (1965–1967), Houston Astrodome (1968–1969)	72–69–4	2	Moved to Nashville, Tennessee in 1997, but played in Memphis as the Tennessee Oilers while waiting for a stadium to be constructed. They began play in Nashville in 1998 and renamed as the Tennessee Titans in 1999.
Eastern	Miami Dolphins	1966	Miami Orange Bowl (1966–1969)	15–39–2	0	Still active in the Miami metropolitan area.
Eastern	Titans of New York/New York Jets	1960	Polo Grounds (1960–1963), Shea Stadium (1964–1969)	71–66–6	1	Still active in the New York metropolitan area.
Western	Cincinnati Bengals	1968	Nippert Stadium (1968–1969)	7–20–1	0	Still active in Cincinnati.
Western	Dallas Texans/Kansas City Chiefs	1960	Cotton Bowl (1960–1962), Municipal Stadium (1963–1969)	92–50–5	3	Still active in Kansas City.
Western	Denver Broncos	1960	Bears Stadium/Mile High Stadium (1960–1969)	39–97–4	0	Still active in Denver.
Western	Los Angeles/San Diego Chargers	1960	Los Angeles Memorial Coliseum (1960), Balboa Stadium (1961–1966), San Diego Stadium (1967–1969)	87–52–6	1	Returned to Los Angeles in 2017.
Western	Oakland Raiders	1960	Kezar Stadium (1960), Candlestick Park (1961), Frank Youell Field (1962–1965), Oakland–Alameda County Coliseum (1966–1969)	80–61–5	1	Moved to Los Angeles in 1982, returned to Oakland in 1995, then moved to Las Vegas, Nevada in 2020.

Today, two of the NFL's eight divisions are composed entirely of former AFL teams, the AFC West (Broncos, Chargers, Chiefs, and Raiders) and the AFC East (Bills, Dolphins, Jets, and Patriots). Additionally, the Bengals now play in the AFC North and the Tennessee Titans (formerly the Oilers) play in the AFC South.

Former stadiums: Oakland–Alameda County Coliseum, Los Angeles Memorial Coliseum, Fenway Park, Nickerson Field, Alumni Stadium, Nippert Stadium, the Cotton Bowl, Balboa Stadium and Kezar Stadium are still standing, but currently do not host a team, and the Houston Astrodome was partially demolished.

== Playoffs ==
From 1960 to 1968, the AFL determined its champion via a single-elimination playoff game between the winners of its two divisions. The home teams alternated each year by division, so in 1968 the Jets hosted the Raiders, even though Oakland had a better record (this was changed in 1969). In 1963, the Buffalo Bills and Boston Patriots finished tied with identical records of 7–6–1 in the AFL East Division. There was no tie-breaker protocol in place, so a one-game playoff was held in War Memorial Stadium in December. The visiting Patriots defeated the host Bills 26–8. The Patriots traveled to San Diego as the Chargers completed a three-game season sweep over the weary Patriots with a 51–10 victory. A similar situation occurred in the 1968 season, when the Oakland Raiders and the Kansas City Chiefs finished the regular season tied with identical records of 12–2 in the AFL West Division. The Raiders beat the Chiefs 41–6 in a division playoff to qualify for the AFL Championship Game. In 1969, the final year of the independent AFL, for the first time professional football featured a playoff team that had not won its division or conference during the regular season. A four-team playoff was held, with the second-place teams in each division playing the winner of the other division. The Chiefs upset the Raiders in Oakland 17–7 in the league's championship, the final AFL game played (except for the league's All-Star game). The Kansas City Chiefs were the first Super Bowl champion to win two road playoff games and the first team to win the Super Bowl despite not having won its division or conference during the regular season.

== Championship Games ==
Eastern Division	Western Division	Super Bowl Appearance	Super Bowl Victory

AFL Championship Games
Season	Date	Winning team	Score	Losing team	MVP	Venue	City	Attendance
1960	January 1, 1961	Houston Oilers	24–16	Los Angeles Chargers	Billy Cannon	Jeppesen Stadium	Houston, Texas	32,183
1961	December 24, 1961	Houston Oilers (2)	10–3	San Diego Chargers	Billy Cannon	Balboa Stadium	San Diego, California	29,556
1962	December 23, 1962	Dallas Texans	20–17 ^{(2OT)}	Houston Oilers	Jack Spikes	Jeppesen Stadium (2)	Houston, Texas (2)	37,981
1963	January 5, 1964	San Diego Chargers	51–10	Boston Patriots	Keith Lincoln	Balboa Stadium (2)	San Diego, California (2)	30,127
1964	December 26, 1964	Buffalo Bills	20–7	San Diego Chargers	Jack Kemp	War Memorial Stadium	Buffalo, New York	40,242
1965	December 26, 1965	Buffalo Bills (2)	23–0	San Diego Chargers	Jack Kemp	Balboa Stadium (3)	San Diego, California (3)	30,361
1966	January 1, 1967	Kansas City Chiefs (2)	31–7	Buffalo Bills	Len Dawson	War Memorial Stadium (2)	Buffalo, New York (2)	42,080
1967	December 31, 1967	Oakland Raiders	40–7	Houston Oilers	Daryle Lamonica	Oakland–Alameda County Coliseum	Oakland, California	53,330
1968	December 29, 1968	New York Jets	27–23	Oakland Raiders	Joe Namath	Shea Stadium	Flushing, New York	62,627
1969	January 4, 1970	Kansas City Chiefs (3)	17–7	Oakland Raiders	Otis Taylor	Oakland–Alameda County Coliseum (2)	Oakland, California (2)	53,564

- Eastern Division hosted in even-numbered seasons, Western in odd.
Location of AFL Champions # titles: 1-white 2-blue

== All-Star games ==
The AFL did not play an All-Star game after its first season in 1960, but did stage All-Star games for the 1961 through 1969 seasons. All-Star teams from the Eastern and Western divisions played each other after every season except 1965. That season, the league champion Buffalo Bills played all-stars from the other teams.

After the 1964 season, the AFL All-Star game had been scheduled for early 1965 in New Orleans' Tulane Stadium. After numerous black players were refused service by a number of area hotels and businesses, black and white players alike called for a boycott. Led by Bills players such as Cookie Gilchrist, the players successfully lobbied to have the game moved to Houston's Jeppesen Stadium.

== All-Time Team ==
As chosen by 1969 AFL Hall of Fame Selection committee members:

All-Time AFL Team
Offense		Defense		Special teams	
Position	Player	Position	Player	Position	Player
WR	Lance Alworth	End	Jerry Mays	K	George Blanda
End	Don Maynard	End	Gerry Philbin	K	George Blanda
TE	Fred Arbanas	T	Houston Antwine	K	George Blanda
T	Ron Mix	T	Tom Sestak	K	George Blanda
T	Jim Tyrer	LB	Bobby Bell	K	George Blanda
C	Jim Otto	LB	George Webster	K	George Blanda
G	Ed Budde	LB	Nick Buoniconti	P	Jerrel Wilson
G	Billy Shaw	CB	Willie Brown	P	Jerrel Wilson
QB	Joe Namath	CB	Dave Grayson	P	Jerrel Wilson
RB	Clem Daniels	S	Johnny Robinson	P	Jerrel Wilson
RB	Paul Lowe	S	George Saimes	P	Jerrel Wilson

== Records ==
The following is a sample of some records set during the existence of the league. The NFL considers AFL statistics and records equivalent to its own.

- Yards passing, game – 464, George Blanda (Oilers, October 29, 1961)
- Yards passing, season – 4,007, Joe Namath (Jets, 1967)
- Yards passing, career – 21,130, Jack Kemp (Chargers, Bills)
- Yards rushing, game – 243, Cookie Gilchrist (Bills, December 8, 1963)
- Yards rushing, season – 1,458, Jim Nance (Patriots, 1966)
- Yards rushing, career – 5,101, Clem Daniels (Texans, Raiders)
- Receptions, season – 101, Charlie Hennigan (Oilers, 1964)
- Receptions, career – 567, Lionel Taylor (Broncos)
- Points scored, season – 155, Gino Cappelletti (Patriots, 1964)
- Points scored, career – 1,100, Gino Cappelletti (Patriots)

== Players, coaches, and contributors ==
- List of American Football League players
- American Football League Most Valuable Players
- American Football League Rookies of the Year
- American Football League draft
- American Football League officials

=== Commissioners/presidents of the American Football League ===
- Joe Foss, commissioner (November 30, 1959 – April 7, 1966)
- Al Davis, commissioner (April 8, 1966 – July 25, 1966)
- Milt Woodard, president (July 25, 1966 – March 12, 1970)

== 50th anniversary celebration ==
As the influence of the AFL continues through the present, the 50th anniversary of its launch was celebrated during 2009. The season-long celebration began in August with the 2009 Pro Football Hall of Fame Game in Canton, Ohio, between two AFC teams (as opposed to the AFC-vs-NFC format the game first adopted in 1971). The opponents were two of the original AFL franchises, the Buffalo Bills and Tennessee Titans (the former Houston Oilers). Bills' owner Ralph C. Wilson Jr. (a 2009 Hall of Fame inductee) and Titans' owner Bud Adams were the only surviving members of the Foolish Club at the time (both are now deceased; Wilson's estate sold the team in 2014), the eight original owners of AFL franchises. (As of the 2025 season, the Titans and Chiefs are still owned by descendants of the original eight owners.)

The Hall of Fame Game was the first of several "Legacy Weekends", during which each of the "original eight" AFL teams sported uniforms from their AFL era. Each of the 8 teams took part in at least two such "legacy" games. On-field officials also wore red-and-white-striped AFL uniforms during these games.

In the fall of 2009, the Showtime pay-cable network premiered Full Color Football: The History of the American Football League, a 5-part documentary series produced by NFL Films that features vintage game film and interviews as well as more recent interviews with those associated with the AFL.

The NFL sanctioned a variety of "Legacy" gear to celebrate the AFL anniversary, such as "throwback" jerseys, T-shirts, signs, pennants and banners, including items with the logos and colors of the Dallas Texans, Houston Oilers, and Titans of New York, the three Original Eight AFL teams which had since changed names. A December 5, 2009, story by Ken Belson in The New York Times quotes league officials as stating that AFL "Legacy" gear made up twenty to thirty percent of the league's annual $3 billion merchandise income. Fan favorites were the Denver Broncos' vertically striped socks, which could not be re-stocked quickly enough.

== See also ==
- American Football League win–loss records
- American Football League seasons
- American Football League playoffs
- List of leagues of American football
- American Basketball Association
- World Hockey Association
