= Renée =

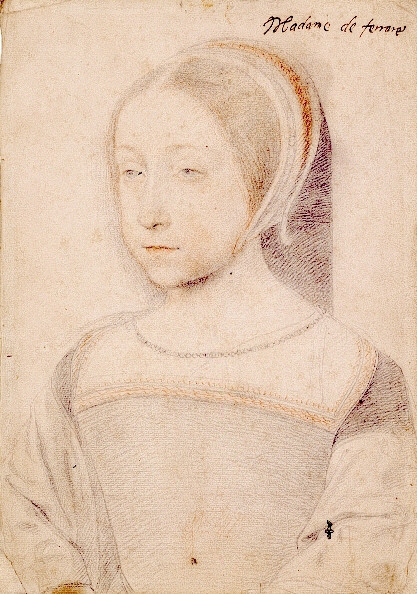
- Renée of France was a 16th-century French princess
- Pronunciation: English: /rəˈneɪ/ rə-NAY, UK also /ˈrɛneɪ/ REN-ay; French: [ʁəne]
- Gender: Female

Origin
- Origin: French, Latin
- Meaning: reborn, born again

Other names
- Related names: René, Renata

Renée (without the accent in non-French speaking countries) is a French feminine given name and surname.

Renée is the female form of René, with the extra "e" making it feminine according to French grammar. The name Renée is the French form of the late Roman name Renatus and the meaning is reborn or born again. In medieval times, the meaning was associated with the Christian concept of being spiritually born again through baptism.

Renee was among the top 100 names given to girls in the United States in the late 1950s, the 1960s, the 1970s and the early 1980s. It ranked as the 734th most popular name given to American girls in 2008 and is continuing to fall in popularity.

== Given name ==
- Renée and Renato, British male/female vocal duo
- Renée Adorée (1898–1933), French actress of the silent era
- Renee Alway (born 1986), American fashion model
- Renee Amoore (1953–2020), American health care advocate
- Renée Asherson (1915–2014), English actress
- Renée Aubin (born 1963), Canadian Olympic fencer
- Reneé Austin (born 1966), American singer
- Renée Baillargeon (born 1954), psychology professor at the University of Illinois Urbana-Champaign
- Renee Bargh (born 1986), Australian celebrity and TV presenter
- Renée Belliveau, Canadian writer and archivist
- Renée Björling (1898–1975), Swedish actress
- Renée A. Blake, Caribbean American linguistics professor at New York University
- Renee Blount (born 1957), American professional tennis player
- Renée Pietrafesa Bonnet (1938–2022), French/Uruguayan musician
- Renée Bordereau (1770–1824), French woman who disguised herself as a man
- Renee Botta (born 1965), Chair of the Department of Media, Film & Journalism Studies at the University of Denver
- Renée of Bourbon (1494–1539), daughter of Gilbert de Bourbon, Count of Montpensier
- Renée Marie Bumb (born 1960), district judge for the United States District Court for the District of New Jersey
- Renée C. Byer (born 1958), American documentary photojournalist
- Renée Carl (1875–1954), French actress of the silent era
- Renée Caroline de Roullay Créquy, Marquise de Créquy (1714–1803), French aristocrat
- Renée Carpentier-Wintz (1913–2003), French painter
- Renee Chatterton (born 1989), Australian Olympic rower
- Renée Chen (born 1985), Taiwanese singer and songwriter
- Renee Chenault-Fattah (born 1957), Philadelphia news anchor
- Renee Cipriano, former director of the Illinois Environmental Protection Agency
- Renee Cole (born c. 1971), American beauty pageant contestant, Miss Maryland 1993
- Renée Coleman, Canadian-born American actress
- Renée Colliard (1933–2022), Swiss alpine skier
- Renee Cox (born 1960), Jamaican-American artist, political activist and curator
- Renée de Dinteville (15??–1580), German-Roman monarch
- Renee del Colle, Canadian wheelchair basketball player
- Renée Doria (1921–2021), French opera singer
- Renée Dunan (1892–1936), French writer
- Renee Ellmers (born 1964), the U.S. representative for North Carolina's 2nd congressional district
- Renée Estevez (born 1967), American actress
- Renée Jeanne Falconetti (1892–1946), French stage and film actress
- Renee Jimenez (born 1981), American basketball coach
- Renée Faure (1919–2005), French actress
- Renée Ferrer de Arréllaga (born 1944), Paraguayan poet and novelist
- Renee Fitzgerald, Irish camogie player
- Renee Flavell (born 1982), New Zealand badminton player
- Renée Fleming (born 1959), American soprano
- Renée Fox (1928–2020), American sociologist
- Renée of France (1510–1574), younger daughter of Louis XII of France
- Renée French (born 1963), American comics writer and illustrator
- Renée French (actress), American actress
- Renée Friedman, American egyptologist
- Renee Gadd (1908–2003), Argentine-born British film actress
- Renée Gailhoustet (1929–2023), French architect
- Renée Galaber (1894–1956), French scientist
- Renée Garilhe (1923–1991), French Olympic fencer
- Renée Geyer (1953–2023), Australian singer
- Renée Gill Pratt (born 1954), local politician from New Orleans
- Renee Godfrey (1919–1964), American stage and motion picture actress and singer
- Renée Good (1988–2026), American citizen shot by United States Immigration and Customs Enforcement (ICE)
- Renee Ghosh, Lebanese actress
- Renée Elise Goldsberry (born 1971), American actress, singer and songwriter
- Renee Grant-Williams, Nashville, Tennessee vocal coach
- Renée Green (born 1959), American artist, writer and filmmaker
- Renee Griffin, aka Renee Allman, aka Renee Ammann (born 1968), American actress
- Reneé Hall (born 1971), American police chief
- Renée Hayek, Lebanese writer and novelist
- Renee Hobbs (born 1958), American educator, scholar and advocate for media literacy education
- Renée Houston (1902–1980), Scottish comedy actor and revue artist
- Renee Humphrey (born 1975), American actress
- Renée Jeryd (born 1965), Swedish social democratic politician
- Renée Jones (born 1958), American actress
- Renée Jones-Bos, 44th representative of the Kingdom of the Netherlands to the United States
- Renee Kelly (1888–1965), British stage and film actress
- Renée Kosel (born 1943), member of the Illinois House of Representatives
- Renee Laravie (born 1959), American Olympic swimmer
- Renée Lawless (born 1960), American actress
- Renee Leota (born 1990), New Zealand association football player
- Renee Lim, Australian actress, television presenter and medical doctor
- Renee MacRae (b. 1940), a Scottish woman who is missing, presumed to have been murdered
- Renee Magee (1959–2022), American Olympic swimmer
- Renée Maheu, (1929–2007), Canadian biographer, journalist and soprano
- Renée Manfredi, American novelist
- Renee Marlin-Bennett (b. 1959), political science professor at Johns Hopkins University
- Renée Mayer (1900–1969), British child actress
- Renee McHugh (born c. 1988), Philippines fashion model and beauty queen
- Renée Miller, computer science professor at University of Toronto, Canada
- Moi Renée (died 1997), Jamaican-born American singer and performer
- Renée Montagne, American radio journalist
- Renee Montgomery, American basketball player
- Renée Morisset (1928–2009), Canadian pianist
- Renee Nele (born 1932), German sculptor
- Renée Nicoux (born 1951), French politician and member of the Senate of France
- Renee O'Connor (born 1971), American actress, producer and director
- Marie-Renée Oget (born 1945), French politician, member of the National Assembly
- Renee Olstead (born 1989), American actress and singer
- Renée Oro (born 1900–UNK), Argentine filmmaker of the silent era
- Renee Paquette (aka Renee Young; born 1984), Canadian sports broadcaster, currently working with the WWE
- Renee Peck (born 1953), American writer
- Renee Percy, Canadian actress, writer, and comedian
- Renee Poetschka, Australian athlete
- Renee Powell (born 1946), an American professional golfer
- Renee Props (born 1962), American actress
- Renee Rabinowitz (1934–2020), Israeli-American psychologist and lawyer
- Reneé Rapp (born 2000), American actress and singer
- Renee Raudman, an actress and voice actress
- Renee Reuter, American politician
- Renée Richards (born 1934), American ophthalmologist, author and tennis player
- Renee Robinson, American dancer
- Renée Roca (born 1963), American figure skater and choreographer
- Renee Roberts (1908–1996), English actress
- Renee Rollason (born 1989), Australian football (soccer) player
- Renee Rosnes (born 1962), Canadian musician
- Renee Roszel, American writer
- Renée Saint-Cyr (1904–2004), French actress
- Renee Sands (born 1974), American singer and actress
- Renée Scheltema (born 1951), Dutch documentary filmmaker
- Renee Schulte (born 1970), American politician
- Renée Schuurman (1939–2001), South African tennis player
- Renée Schwarzenbach-Wille (1883–1959), Swiss photographer
- Renee Sebastian (born 1973), Filipino-American singer and songwriter
- Renée Short (1919–2003), British politician
- Renee Simons (born 1972), Canadian curler
- Renée Simonsen (born 1965), Danish model and writer
- Renée Sintenis (1888–1965), German artist
- Renée Slegers (born 1989), Dutch international football midfielder
- Jamie Renée Smith (born 1987), American actress
- Renée Felice Smith (born 1985), American actress
- Renée Sonnenberg, Canadian curler
- Renée Soutendijk (born 1957), Dutch actress
- Renee Spearman (born 1969), gospel recording artist, singer, songwriter and producer
- Renée Stobrawa (1897–1971), German screenwriter and film actress
- Renee Stout (born 1958), American artist
- Renee Tajima-Peña (born c. 1958), film director and producer
- Renée Taylor (born 1933), American actress
- Renée (writer) (1929–2023), New Zealand writer and playwright
- Renee Tenison (born 1968), American model and actress
- Renee Torres (1911–1998), Mexican-American actress
- Renee Lynn Vicary (1957–2002), American competitive female bodybuilder
- Renée Victor (born 1953), American actress
- Renée Vivien (1877–1909), British poet writing in French
- Renée Webster, Australian filmmaker
- Renée Weibel (born 1986), Swiss actress
- Renee Williams (1977–2007), American woman believed to be the largest woman in the world at the time of her death
- Renée Zellweger (born 1969), American actress

=== In fiction ===
- Renée, a minor character in Buffy the Vampire Slayer
- Renée, a character in Claymore
- Renee, a character in the TV series Watchmen
- Renee, a character in the film The Grudge 3
- Renee, protagonist of the Pixar short film Loop
- Renee Blasey, aka Wraith, from the battle royale video game Apex Legends
- Renee Bradshaw, character in the British soap opera Coronation Street
- Renée Divine Buchanan, character in the American soap opera One Life to Live
- Renée DuMonde, character in the television soap opera Days of Our Lives
- Renée Dwyer, a character in the Twilight novel series
- Renee Fitzpatrick, in She's the One, played by Jennifer Aniston
- Renee Graves, a character from the indie video game The Coffin of Andy and Leyley
- Renee Montoya, a DC Comics character
- Renee Perry, a character in the ABC series Desperate Housewives
- Renée Picard, a Star Trek character and ancestor of Jean-Luc Picard
- Renée Ratelle, from the Canadian animated series Jacob Two Two
- Renée Rienne, character in the spy-fi series Alias
- Renee Roberts, English dub name of Zakuro Fujiwara in the manga series Tokyo Mew Mew
- Renee "Ren" Stevens, the lead character of the Disney Channel Original Series Even Stevens
- Renée de Villefort, first wife of Gérard de Villefort in Alexandre Dumas's The Count of Monte Cristo
- Renee Walker, a character in the TV series 24
- Renee Wilson, a character from Backbone (video game)

== Surname ==
- Lyne Renée (born 1979), Belgian actress

== Variants in different language origins ==
رينيه Arabic

Rena English, Polish

Renae English

Renata Italian, Portuguese, Romanian, Spanish

Renáta Czech, Hungarian, Slovak

Renate Dutch, French, German

Renátka Czech

Renča Czech

Renea Bosnian, Croatian, Serbian, Slovene

Renee English

Renée French

Renia Polish

Renita Spanish

Renāte Latvian

== See also ==
- Rennae Stubbs, Australian professional tennis player, coach and television commentator
- Renée (disambiguation)
