= Vicary =

Vicary may refer to:

== Given name ==
- Vicary Gibbs (1751–1820), English judge and politician
- Vicary Gibbs, 6th Baron Aldenham (born 1948), British peer
- Vicary Gibbs (St Albans MP) (1853–1932), British barrister, merchant and Conservative politician

== Surname ==
- James Vicary (1915–1977), American mind-control theorist
- Renee Lynn Vicary (1957–2002), American competitive bodybuilder
- Richard Vicary (1918–2006), British artist and printmaker
- Thomas Vicary (c. 1490—1561), English physician, surgeon, and anatomist

== See also ==
- Vicarage
- Vicari, a commune in Palermo, Italy
- Vicary House (disambiguation)
