= James Temple (disambiguation) =

James Temple was a regicide of Charles I.

James Temple may also refer to:

- J. R. Temple (James Roland Temple, 1899–1980), mayor of Dallas
- James Temple, a character in the film Key Largo

== See also ==
- James Temple-Smithson
