= Play Nice =

Play Nice may refer to:

== Film and TV ==
- Play Nice, a 1992 horror film directed by Terri Treas
- Play Nice, a 2014 comedy film directed by Rodman Flender

== Music ==
- Play Nice, a 2015 album from ApologetiX
- "Don't Play Nice" debut single by English recording artist Verbalicious, now known as Natalia Kills
- Play Nice Recordings The Nextmen
- Play Nice EP in 2013 Donora (band)
- Play Nice Amanda Havard 2012

== Other ==
- Play Nice: The Rise, Fall, and Future of Blizzard Entertainment, a 2024 book by Jason Schreier
