= McMansion =

Large mass-produced dwelling

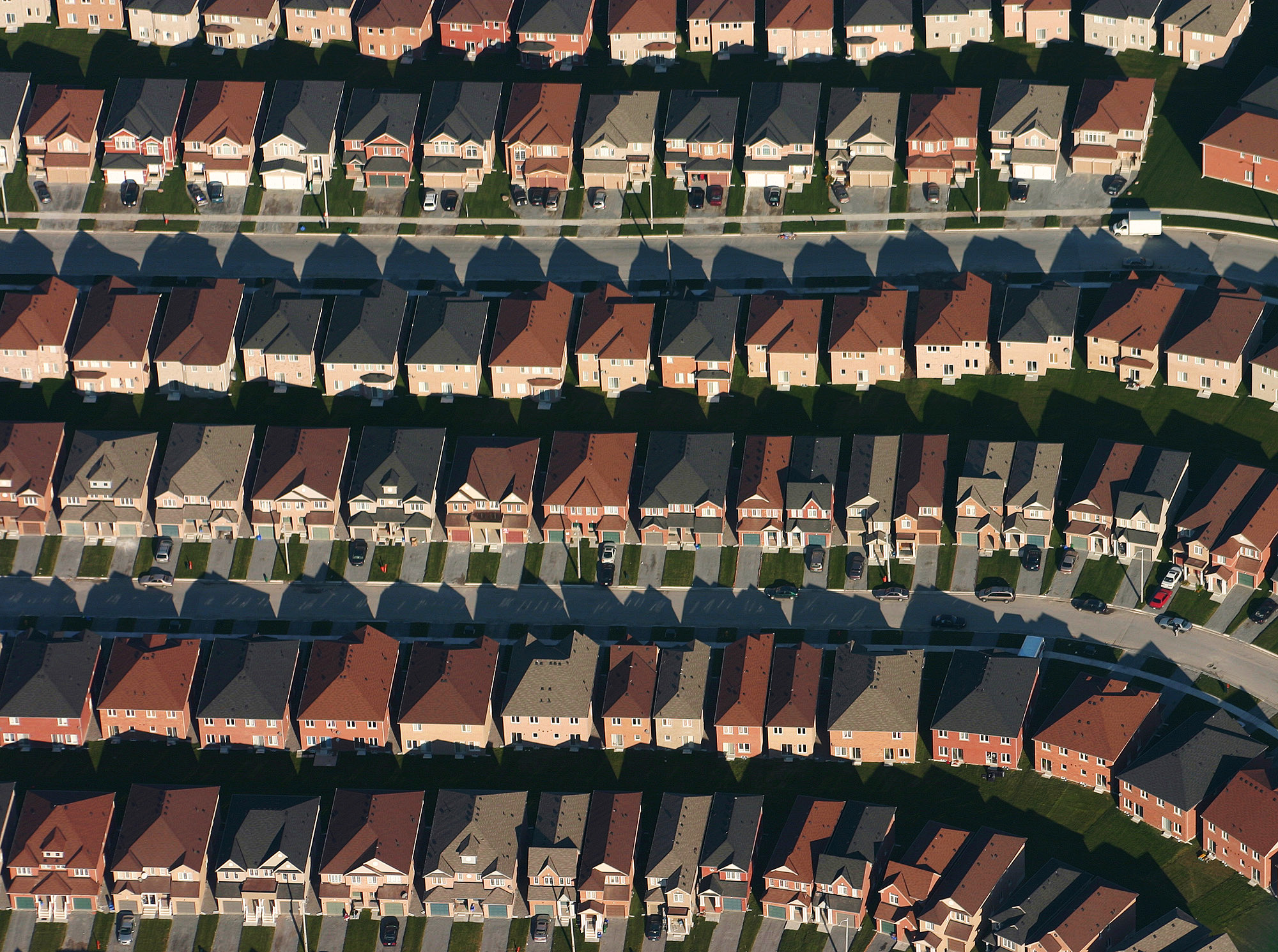
Tract housing in Markham, Ontario

A McMansion is a large house in a suburban community, typically marketed to the upper middle class in developed countries. Architectural historian Virginia Savage McAlester, who gave a first description of the common features which define this building style, coined the more neutral term Millennium Mansion. An example of a McWord, "McMansion" associates the generic quality of these luxury houses with that of mass-produced fast food by evoking McDonald's, an American restaurant chain. The neologism "McMansion" seems to have been coined sometime in the early 1980s. (Note: An example from Braces, gym suits, and early-morning seminary: a youthquake survival manual (1985) by Joni Winn [Hilton]: "The McMansion, by the way, is really just the largest house in the neighborhood") It appeared in the Los Angeles Times in 1990 and The New York Times in 1998. Other terms used to describe "McMansions" include "Persian palace", "Garage Mahal", "starter castle", and "Hummer house". Marketing parlance often uses the term "tract mansions" or executive homes.

== Description ==
The term "McMansion" generally denotes a multi-story house that either has no clear architectural style, or prizes sheer size over quality. It is usually part of a planned development where all of the houses are built from a small number of models, giving the community a mass-produced appearance.

One real-estate writer explains a successful formula typically found in McMansions: "symmetrical structures on clear-cut lots with Palladian windows centered over the main entry, and brick or stone enhancing the driveway entrance, plus multiple chimneys, dormers, pilasters, and columns—and inside, the master suite with dressing rooms and bath-spa, great rooms, breakfast and dining rooms, showplace kitchen, and extra high and wide garages for multiple cars and SUVs."

These houses also typically have 3,000 square feet (280 m^{2}) or more of floor area, ceilings 9 to 10 feet (2.5 to 3m) high or higher, a two-story portico, a two-story front door hall (often containing a large chandelier), a garage with room for three or more cars, many bedrooms (with some having five or more), many bathrooms, extensive crown molding and related features, and lavish—if superficial—interior features.

As noted above, a McMansion replacing a smaller house in a community of smaller-sized houses will cover a much larger portion of the lot than the previous house; in the other usage, McMansions are built en masse in homogeneous communities by a single developer.

== Origins ==
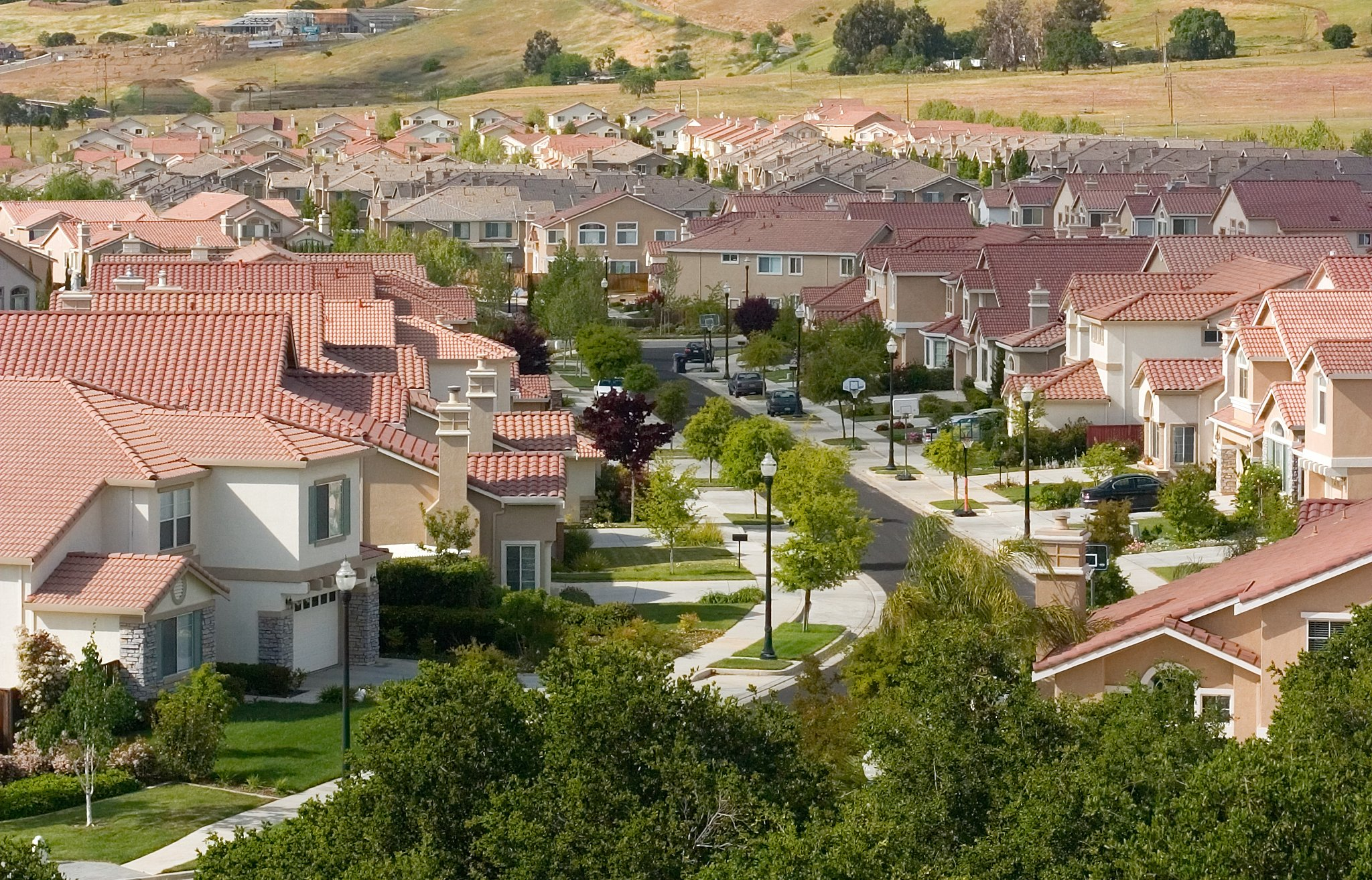
A 2005 photo of a new housing development in San Jose, California

Beginning in California in the late 1970s, the larger home concept was intended to fill a gap between the more modest suburban tract housing and the upscale, often custom, houses found in gated, waterfront, or golf course communities. Such communities were developed as subdivisions, or pre-existing neighborhoods were transformed by building on empty lots or replacing torn-down structures. The larger houses proved popular and demand increased dramatically, particularly in light of new land-management laws that were enacted in the 1980s and 1990s.

Efforts to economize may have led to a decline in quality for many of these new houses, prompting the coinage of the disparaging term. Because these houses emphasize instant gratification, they are almost never designed with energy efficiency, environmental sustainability, maintainability, or longevity in mind.

In a development that runs counter to the previous boom in construction of McMansions, a 2009 report suggested that the Great Recession (2008–2012) has stabilized new house sizes in the United States. However, as the economy recovered, home sizes returned to their upward trend.

Throughout the 2010s, the McMansion style started to fall out of favor, during which the McModern, a newer style of single-family home, began to appear in urban neighborhoods of North America. Unlike McMansions' excessive ornamentation and arbitrary architectural style, McModerns emulate modernist architectural styles and are more popular with Millennials.

== Attributes ==
=== Location ===
In a city, traditional upscale custom houses are mostly found in the most affluent residential neighbourhoods (commonly regarded as "Millionaires' Mile"), which are typically gated, waterfront, ravine, or golf course communities, all of which have some of the highest residential property taxes in the city. Most of these communities are usually well-established, and the real estate prices tend to be high but stable. The houses themselves feature architectural preferences in general accordance with the surrounding neighborhood.

By contrast, McMansions are typically constructed further from the city center than suburban tract housing. In addition, the land that McMansions are built on is often zoned as agricultural or re-zoned to residential from agricultural, and is often outside of the city proper limits, as both of these result in lower property taxes. These areas may be in demand by buyers who desire a bigger house than the tract house, but are unwilling to pay for (or lack the means to afford) houses in the city's traditional upscale neighborhoods. Due to this demographic, which is more susceptible to boom and bust economic cycles, prices of McMansions tend to be much more volatile and are often fueled by speculation.

Another reason why McMansions are generally found in outlying suburban areas is that lots in older neighborhoods are often much smaller and not conducive to such residences. McMansions are usually much larger than older houses and constructed among other large houses by a subdivider on speculation; they generally are built en masse by a development company to be marketed as premium real estate, but offer few custom features. The construction of what seems to be too large a house on an existing lot can draw the ire of neighbors and other local residents. In 2006, for example, a recently built house in Kirkland, Washington – an affluent suburb on Seattle's Eastside – stood so close to an adjoining property that, in the words of the chair of the city's Neighborhood Association, "you can read the lettering on the canned vegetables in the house next door."

=== Design ===
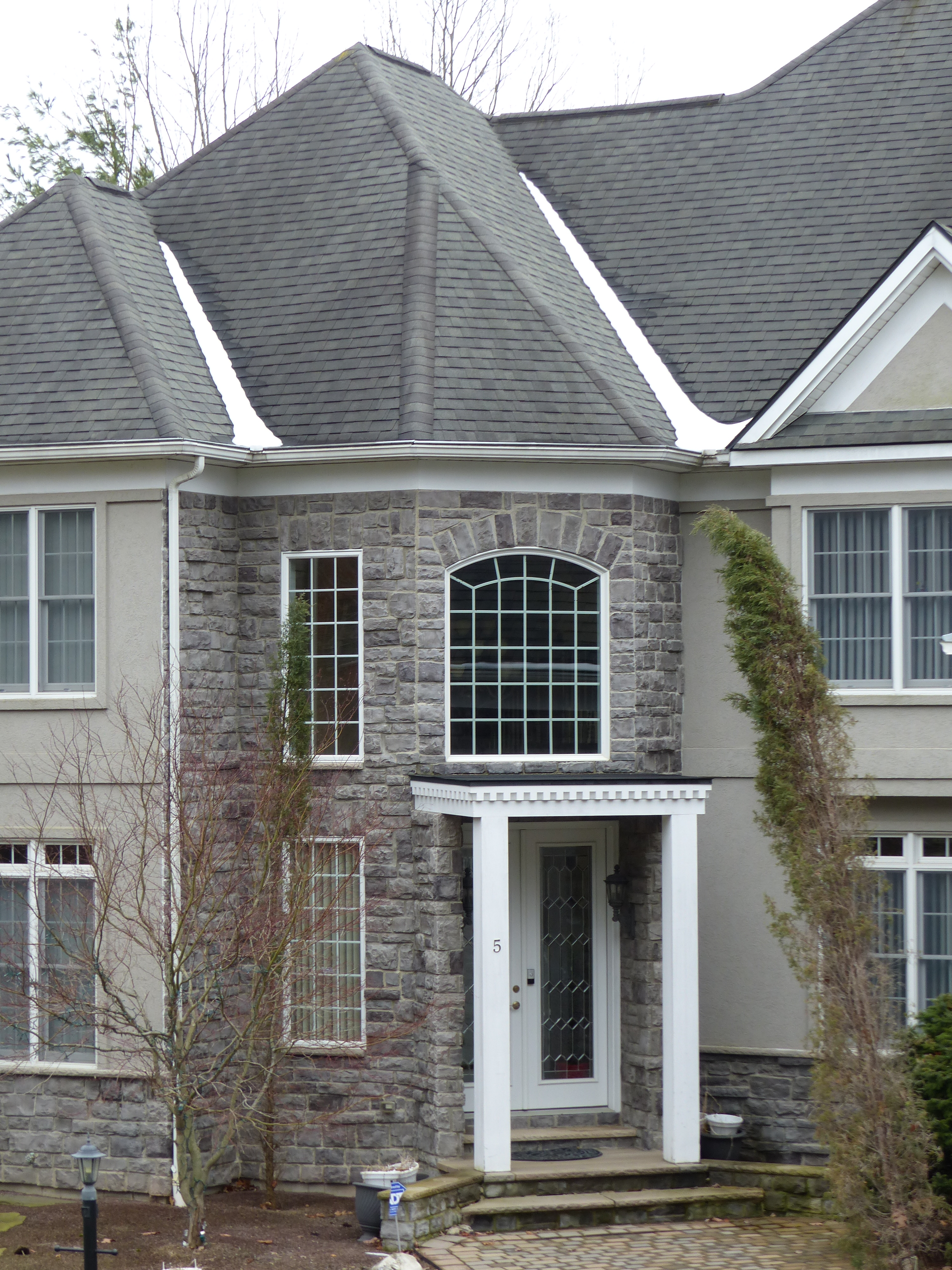
In this house, the decision to make the main entrance angled led to an unusual layout and asphalt shingle roof.

McMansions often mix a variety of different architectural styles and elements, combining quoins, steeply sloped roofs, multiple roof lines, complicated massing, and pronounced dormers, to produce an appearance that may be considered unpleasant, jumbled, or messy.

The builder may have attempted expensive effects with cheap materials, skimped on details, or hidden defects with cladding:

Though construction quality may be subpar and materials shoddy (from faux stucco to styrofoam crown molding and travertine compounded from epoxied marble dust), McMansion buyers are eager; the real-estate writer locates them in the generation of my angst-ridden Boston University students: "mostly young, mobile, career-oriented, high-salaried 30- and 40-something individuals" who are too time-squeezed to hire an architect but seek "a luxury home" that they might soon (and easily) sell whenever "it's time to move on."

Frequently, priority in McMansion construction is given to the interior layout. Vaulted ceilings, the master suite, bay windows, and the expansive foyer are emphasized with less regard for how these interior spaces will shape the overall envelope of the structure. In particular, designing individual windows for their effect in individual rooms can cause the exterior to feature numerous windows with an asymmetrical or misaligned layout, in multiple conflicting sizes and styles. It has been claimed that this gives the exterior appearance an "amorphous" or "bloated" quality.

Some neighborhoods, where most or all the houses have the same layout and design with minor differences, such as siding or shutter color, are often called "cookie-cutter" neighborhoods.

== Economics ==
From the perspective of a housebuilder, luxury houses of 3,000 sq ft (280 m^{2}) or more are more profitable than smaller houses. Multiple communities, like in California and Virginia, have few residential lots available, which inclines builders who acquire them to build luxury housing. In 2014, 32% of the new houses being built had 3,000 sq ft (280 m^{2}) or more of floor space, and the average size of a new construction had increased to over 2,600 sq ft (240 m^{2}).

== Worldwide ==
McMansions have seen rising popularity in China, where there have been replicas of famous buildings such as the White House and the Palace of Versailles.

== Criticism ==
Disdain for the McMansion stems from perceptions that these houses look and feel inappropriate (either by themselves or for a given neighborhood), are wasteful due to their inefficient land usage from suburban sprawl and single-family zoning and the large amounts of materials and utilities needed to construct them, and increase commute times significantly. Some go even further, saying that these houses give an impression that their owners lack taste or refinement or are pretentious, or that they show a general discordance in architectural preferences.

In Australia, a central reason McMansions have received a cold reception, is that the archetypal Australian house is generally a single story, red brick house or a bungalow, and because many McMansions use cement render materials perceived as giving an extremely exaggerated appearance. One observer notes that when older and modest houses are often bought as teardowns and McMansions constructed on the vacant land, many instances have occurred where "a poor house stands side by side with a good house."

The blog McMansion Hell, by Kate Wagner, has been critiquing McMansions since June 2016.

== See also ==
- Burj Al Babas – Abandoned housing development in Turkey
- Executive home
- Mansion
- Neo-eclectic architecture
- Urban sprawl

== Sources ==
- Beal, Wesley (2007). "McMansion". In Weir, R.E. (ed.). Class in America: An Encyclopedia. Bloomsbury Publishing. pp. 504–505. ISBN 978-0-313-06835-5.
- Devlin, Ann Sloan (2010). What Americans build and why: psychological perspectives. Cambridge; New York: Cambridge University Press. ISBN 978-0-521-73435-6. OCLC 473126069.
- Hilton, Joni (1985). Braces, gym suits, and early-morning seminary: a youthquake survival manual. Salt Lake City, Utah: Covenant Recordings. ISBN 1-55503-000-9 – via Internet Archive.
- McAlester, Virginia; McAlester, Arcie Lee (2013). A Field Guide to American Houses. Westminster: Knopf. ISBN 978-1-4000-4359-0.
- McFedries, Paul (2008). The Complete Idiot's Guide to Weird Word Origins. Alpha Books. ISBN 978-1-59257-781-1.
