= Luxury apartment =

Apartment with higher-than-average price and quality

A luxury apartment is a type of apartment that is intended to provide its occupant with higher-than-average levels of comfort, quality and convenience. While the term is often used to describe high-end regular apartments, or even typical apartments as a form of aspirational marketing, a true luxury apartment is one that is variously defined as being in the top 10% of transactions on the market, or having a total value of more than $4–5 million US dollars, with "ultra-luxury" apartments being valued above US$10 million. However, it can also mean any apartment with extra amenities, such as a doorman, yoga studios or bowling alleys, among others.

== History ==
The term "luxury apartment" was used since the postwar era, although its definition was less grandiose than in recent times. In the 1980s, for example, having a doorman for the building was sufficient to mark an apartment as "luxury". Competition to make the most luxurious apartment increased due to the growth of the Internet, which allowed potential buyers to cross-check apartment listings.

== Current examples ==
=== Americas ===
==== New York ====
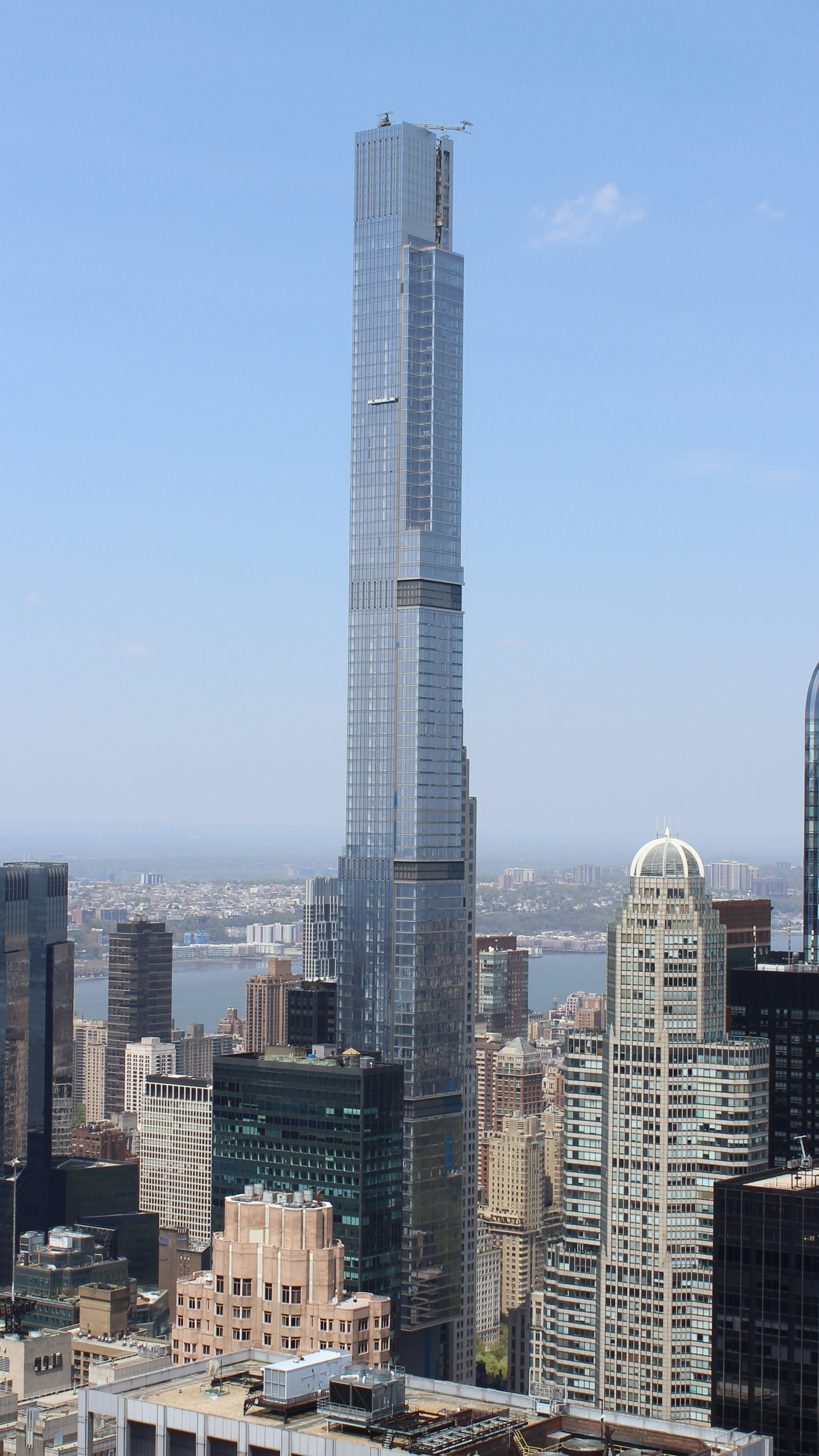
Central Park Tower located at 225 West 57th Street, Manhattan, is currently the tallest primarily residential building in the United States

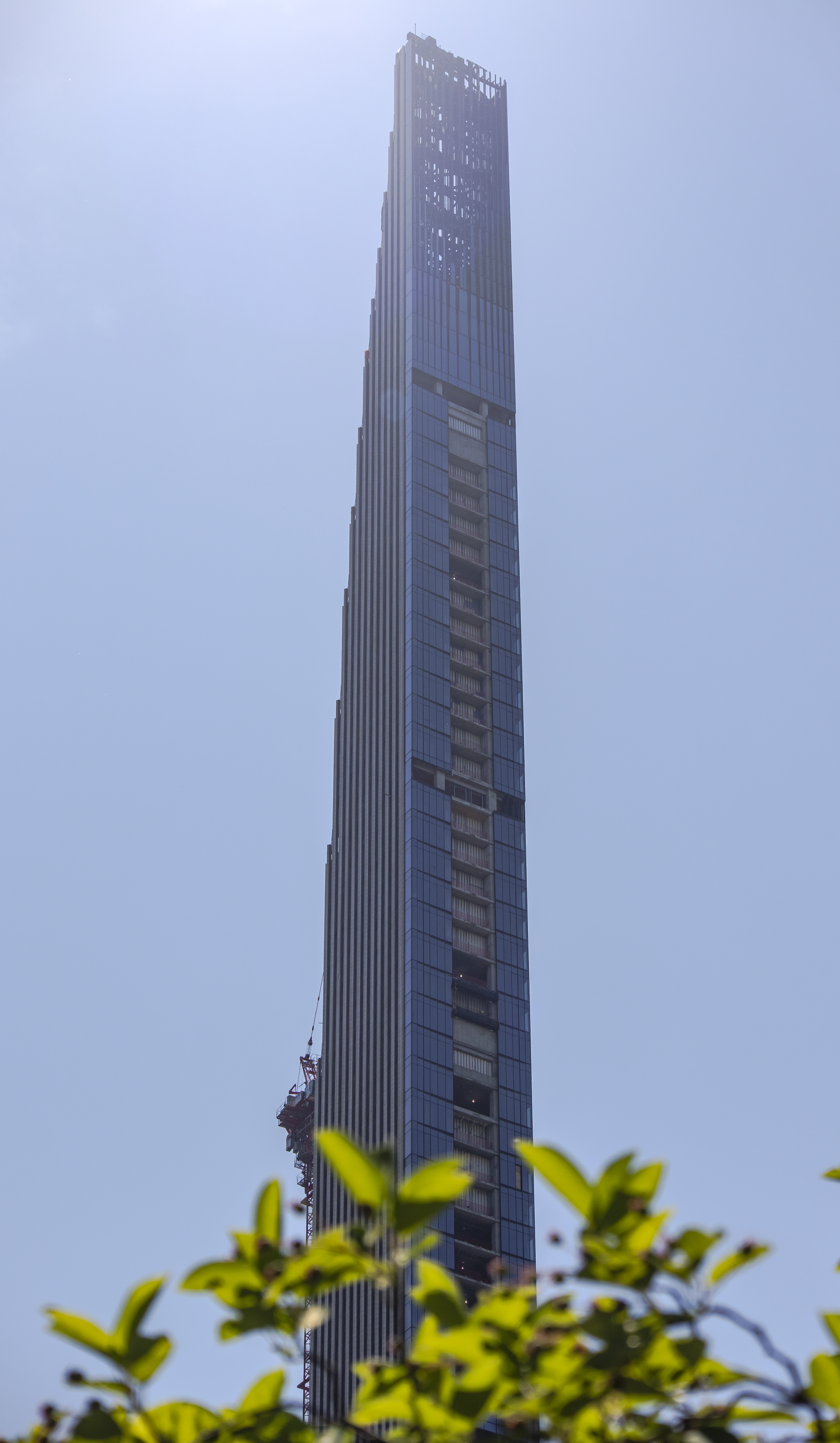
111 West 57th Street in Midtown Manhattan, is the most slender luxury apartment tower in the United States

As of 2016, three out of every four new apartment buildings in New York City were luxury designs targeted towards high-end buyers. This luxury boom is centered in the fastest-growing American cities, but also includes smaller, less-dense cities. It has been linked to the movement of affluent Americans away from suburbs to cities, also known as The Great Inversion.

The 2010s was marked by the construction of many new luxury condominium towers in New York City, often appealing to wealthy overseas buyers, such as One57 and Central Park Tower. Billionaire's Row became known as the location of many of these towers. Williamsburg, Brooklyn had the highest rent increase, rising by 54% on average from 2010 to 2019. Global economic headwinds and unfavorable changes to property and transfer taxes cooled demand, causing a glut of unsold luxury condos. As of 2019, one in four luxury apartments that were built since 2013 were unsold.

=== Europe ===
==== London ====
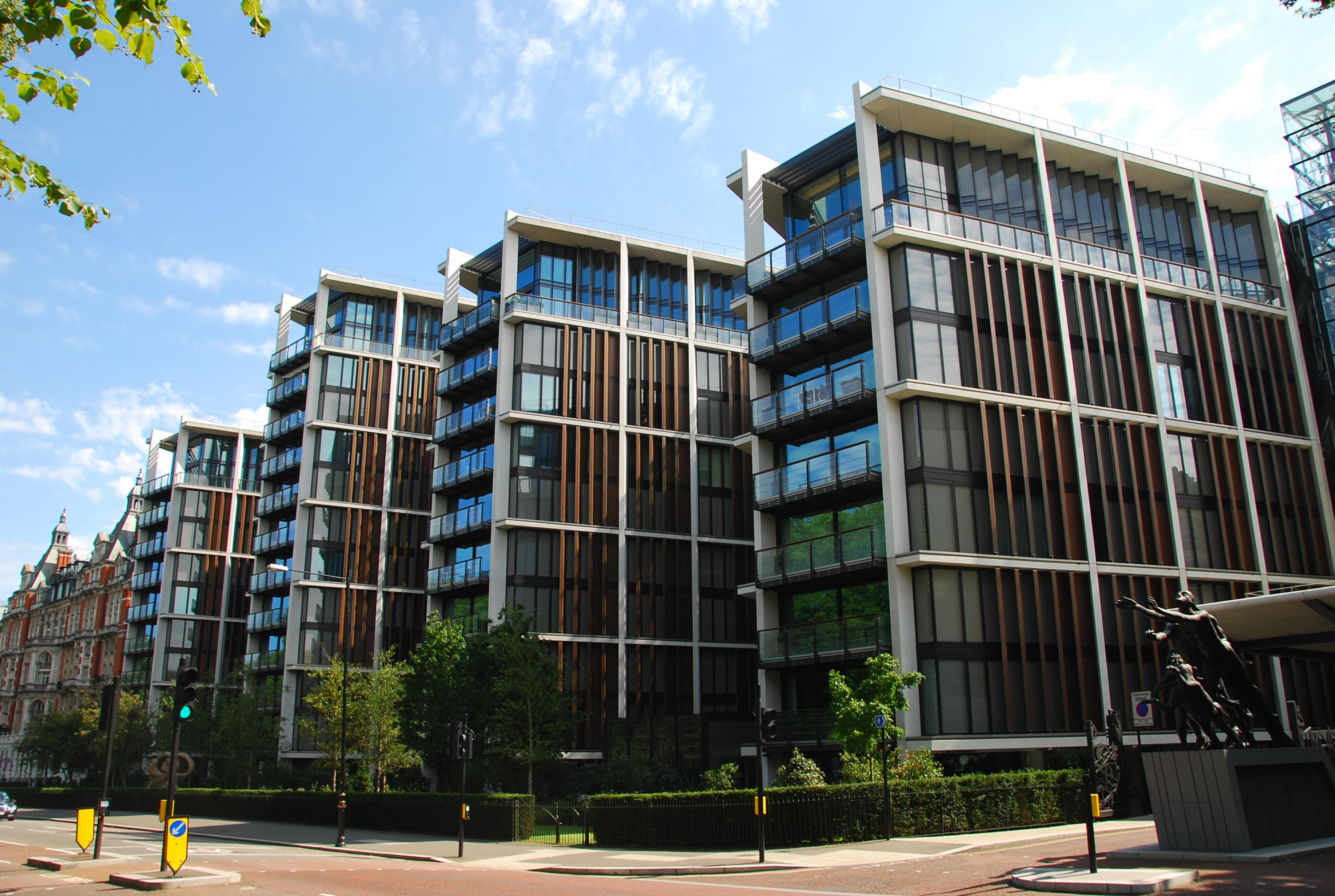
Luxury apartment One Hyde Park is located in Knightsbridge, London

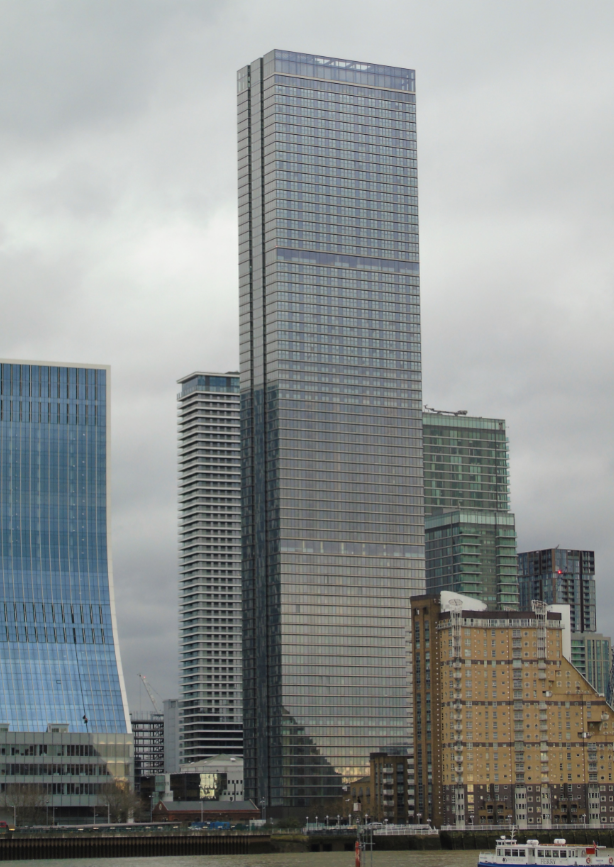
Landmark Pinnacle, located in the Isle of Dogs, London, is the tallest residential building in the United Kingdom

Luxury apartments in London comprise at least around 1,000 sq ft of space and would include high specification fittings such as underfloor heating, air conditioning, marble bathrooms, kitchens with granite or quartz worktops, underground carparks and/or garages, a 24 hour concierge service and an on-site residents-only leisure centre.

==== Spain ====
On the Spanish Mediterranean coast you can find luxury flats or villas with sea views, to enjoy the warm climate with more than 300 days of sunshine a year. An example are the towns of Jávea or Ibiza. Where the price often exceeds one million euros.

=== Asia ===
==== Hong Kong ====
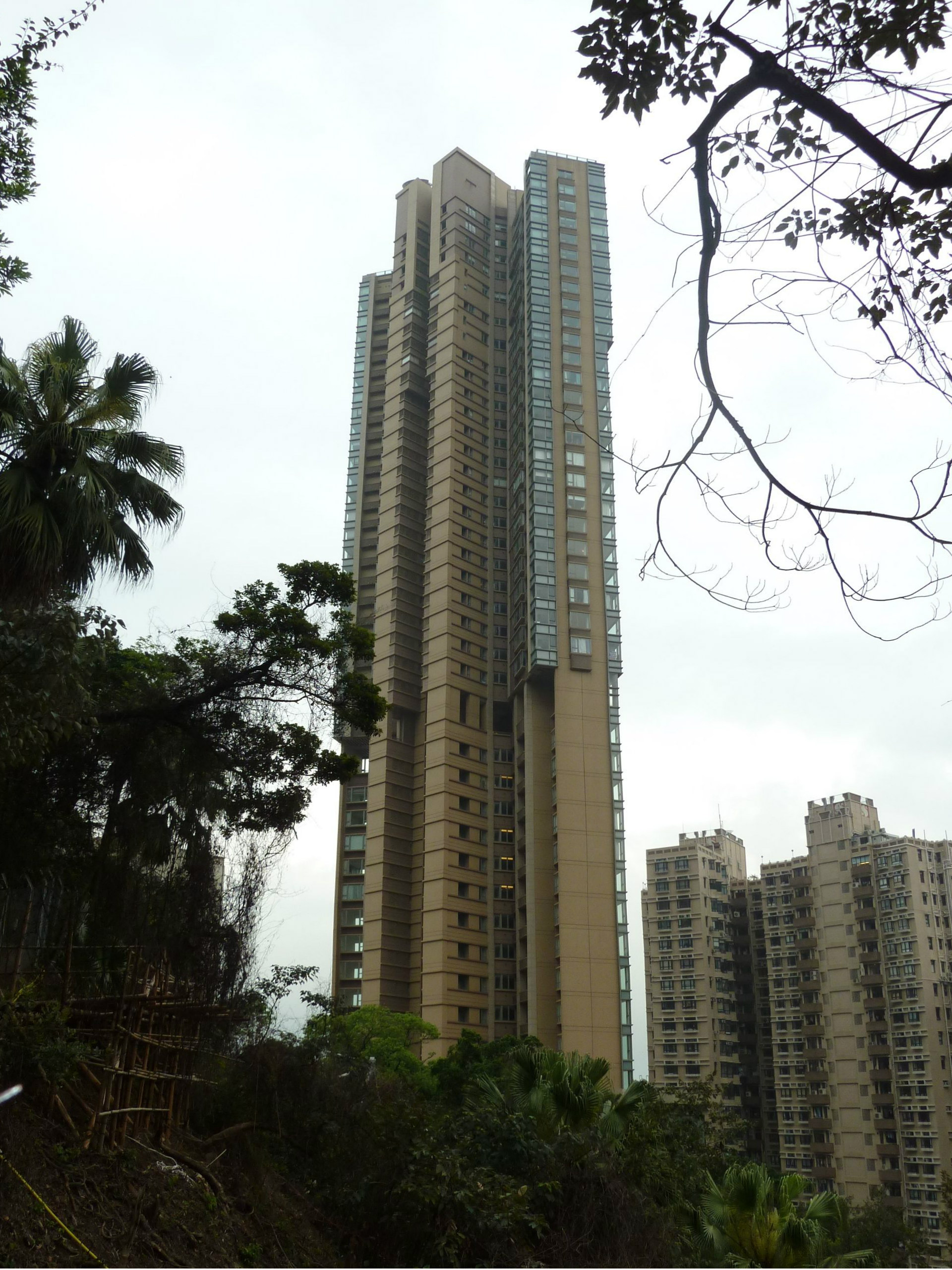
39 Conduit Road, a luxury residential apartment situated in mid-Levels, Hong Kong Island

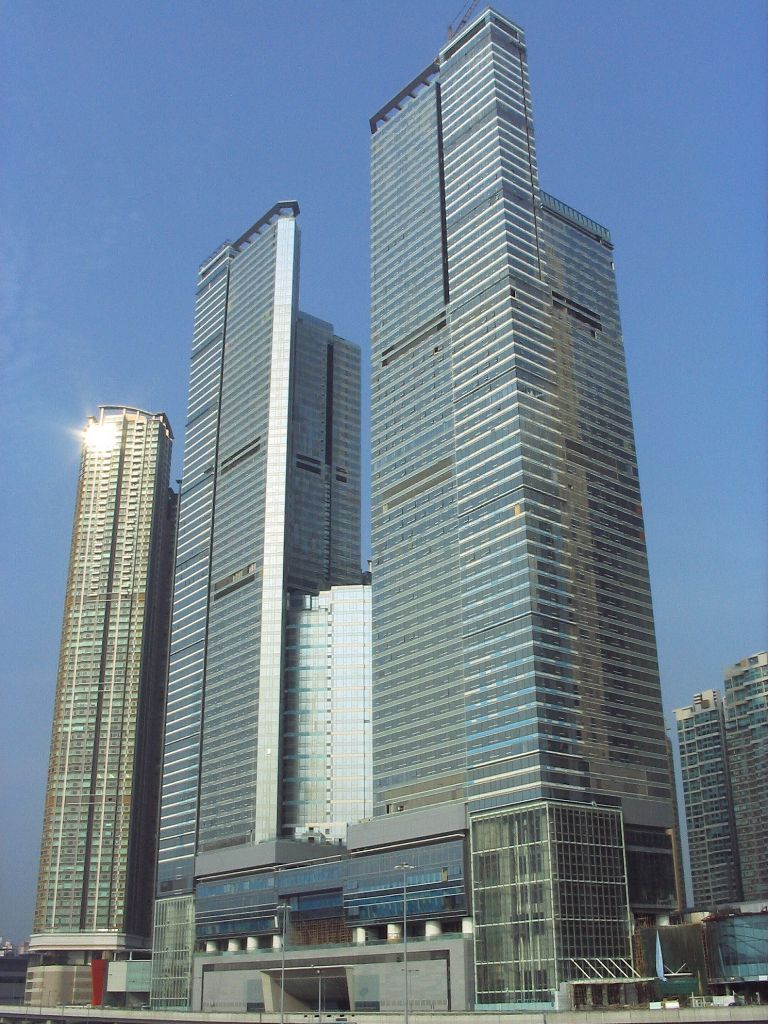
The Cullinan, a luxury residential apartment at the Union Square, is the tallest residential building in Hong Kong

Hong Kong has long been recognised as one of the most expensive property markets in the world, with countless exclusive residential offerings. Though many of the city's famed apartment complexes are found atop the Victoria Peak, there are several other luxury apartments in areas such as Repulse Bay, Deep Water Bay, Mid-Levels, Union Square, Kadoorie Hill, Kowloon Tong and more.

==== Dubai ====
Marina 101 is the tallest residential building in the United Arab Emirates, and only behind the tallest building in the world Burj Khalifa

The Dubai Marina in Dubai, also known as the "tallest block in the world", is home to seven of the ten tallest residential buildings in the world. Marina Quays in Dubai Marina is a complex with luxury apartments and villas. The development has shops and other outlets. The three residential buildings are joined by a shared podium. It has luxury apartments with panoramic views of the marina. The buildings are Quay East, Quay West, and Quay North. The two shorter buildings are cantilevered, extending 20m over the Dubai Marina waterway. Amenities include a movie theatre, 24-hour security, a pool, concierge service, and a swimming pool. As of 2016, luxury penthouses in the buildings sold for in excess of 10 million Dirham. In 2018, five million tonnes of rock was added to create a breakwater for Marina Quays.

== See also ==
- Penthouse apartment
- Executive home
- McMansion
- Mansion
- Palace
- List of tallest residential buildings
