= Lyda Hill =

American investor and philanthropist

- Hill in 2014
- Born: 1942 (age 83–84); Dallas, Texas, US
- Education: Hollins University
- Occupation: Businesswoman
- Known for: Developer of Garden of the Gods
- Mother: Margaret Hunt Hill
- Family: Hunt

Lyda Hill (born 1942) is an American investor and philanthropist. She is a member of the Hunt family.

== Early life ==
Hill was born on 1942, in Dallas, Texas to Albert Galatyn Hill Sr. and Margaret Hunt Hill. She is a member of the Hunt family.

She attended the Hockaday School, an all-girl boarding school in Dallas, from 1952 to 1960. She entered Stanford University in 1960, but left to attend Hollins University. She earned a degree in mathematics from Hollins in 1964, and received its Outstanding Alumnae Award in 2009.

== Career ==
In 1967, Hill launched Hill World Travel, a travel agency located in Dallas. She sold the company in 1982, by which time she had grown the company into the largest travel agency in the city and one of the largest in the country. In 1970, she became President of Seven Falls, a tourist attraction near Colorado Springs, Colorado, where her family spent summers.

She developed and constructed the Garden of the Gods Visitor and Nature Center in Colorado Springs in 1995. In 2011, after the center had donated $3.5 million to the Garden of the Gods Foundation, Hill gave the Visitor Center to the Foundation.

Hill is the granddaughter of Texas oil tycoon H. L. Hunt and inherited oil wealth from him.

Hill has donated extensively to a variety of organizations in the Dallas area and in Colorado. She has joined The Giving Pledge, initiated by Bill and Melinda Gates and Warren Buffett, and has pledged to donate her entire wealth to charity, the bulk of it during her lifetime.

== Awards ==
In 2015, Hill became the 18th recipient of the J. Erik Jonsson Ethics Award, given by the Southern Methodist University's McGuire Center. The award is given to individuals who "personify the spirit of moral leadership and public virtue".

Hill's work with the Garden of the Gods was recognized in 2019 when she received the Land Trust's Stuart P. Dodge Award, honoring a lifetime commitment to conservation.

In 2022, Hill became the recipient of the Spirit of the Springs Lifetime Achievement Award, given by the City of Colorado Springs.
