= Amy Talkington =

American filmmaker, screenwriter, and author

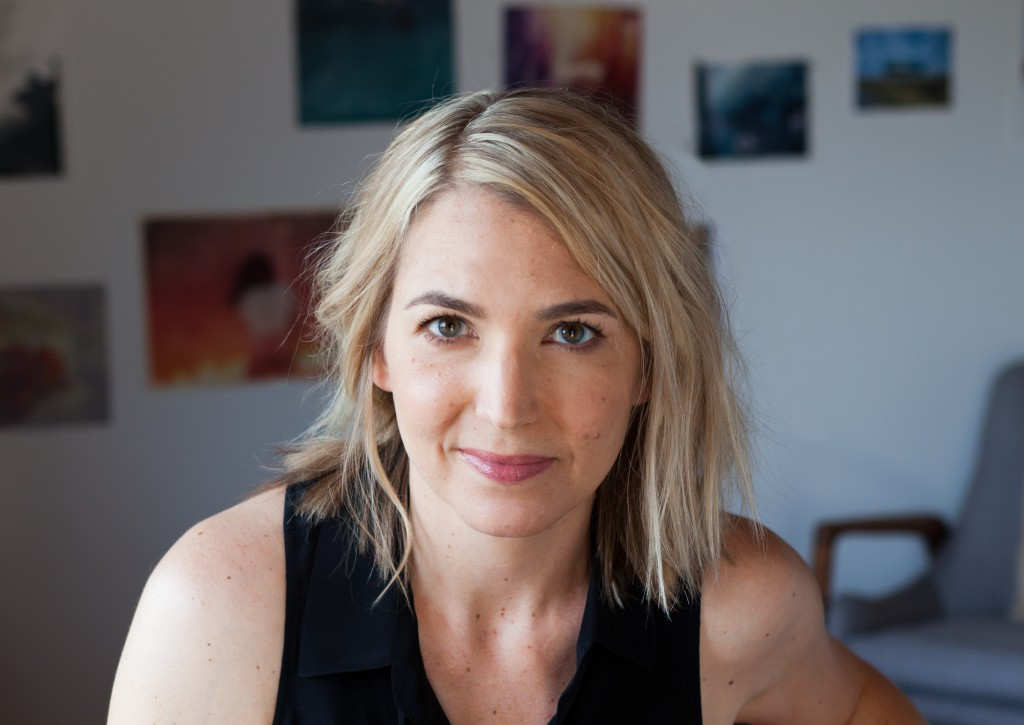
- Born: Dallas, Texas, U.S.
- Education: Barnard College (BA); Columbia University (MFA)
- Alma mater: Choate Rosemary Hall
- Occupations: Film director, writer, producer
- Years active: 1997–present
- Relatives: Wallace H. Savage (grandfather); Virginia Savage McAlester (mother)

Amy Virginia Talkington is an American filmmaker, screenwriter, and author.

== Early life and education ==
Talkington was born in Dallas, Texas. Her father, Clement Talkington, is a surgeon; her mother, Virginia Savage McAlester, was an architectural historian and political activist.

Talkington attended the Hockaday School in Dallas and Choate Rosemary Hall in Connecticut. She received her B.A. from Barnard College and her M.F.A. in film directing from Columbia University's School of the Arts.

== Filmmaking ==
Talkington first received attention for her short films, all of which revolve around a young and headstrong female protagonist. Number One Fan (1997) won the jury prize at the Hamptons International Film Festival; Second Skin (1998) was in competition the Sundance Film Festival and was acquired by Canal +, HBO, and the Sundance Channel; and Bust (1999) was part of Fox 2000's FXM shorts series. The New Arrival (2000) was the first film ever made using the "immersive" running 360-degree camera. It premiered at the Cannes Film Festival and was a part of the Sundance Online Film Festival and International Film Festival Rotterdam.

Talkington wrote and directed her first feature, The Night of the White Pants, in 2006. The film premiered at the Tribeca Festival and stars Tom Wilkinson, Selma Blair, and Nick Stahl. Her screenwriting work includes an adaptation of Ungifted, the musical Undercover, the musical #HotFuss, an adaptation of the memoir Kicked, Bitten, and Scratched, a remake of Valley Girl, and a remake of Private Benjamin. Talkington is also developing an adaptation of her own novel Liv, Forever. She wrote the screenplays for the TV movies Brave New Girl and Avalon High; she and Julie Sherman Wolfe won a Writers Guild of America Award for the latter.

== Personal life ==
Talkington lives in Los Angeles with her husband, record producer, music supervisor, and music editor Robbie Adams. They have two daughters.

== Filmography ==
Short film

Year	Title	Director	Writer	Producer
1997	Number One Fan	Yes	Yes	No
1998	Second Skin	Yes	Yes	No
1999	Bust	Yes	Yes	No
2000	The New Arrival	Yes	Yes	No
2003	Our Very First Sex Tape	Yes	No	No
2007	Confessions	Yes	Yes	Yes

Feature film

Year	Title	Director	Writer
2004	The Night of the White Pants	Yes	Yes
2020	Valley Girl	No	Yes

Television

Year	Title	Writer	Producer
2004	Brave New Girl	Yes	Yes
2008	Avalon High	Yes	No
