= McMansion Hell =

Website which humorously critiques "McMansions"

- Editor: Kate Wagner
- Format: Blog
- Founded: July 2016
- Website: www.mcmansionhell.com

A typical image on McMansion Hell, featuring commentary added to real estate photos

McMansion Hell is a blog that humorously critiques McMansions, large suburban homes typically built from the 1980s to 2008 and known for their stylistic attempt to create the appearance of affluence using mass-produced architecture. The website is run by Kate Wagner, an architecture critic who holds a master's degree in audio science with a specialty in architectural acoustics from Johns Hopkins University's Peabody Conservatory.

== Content ==
A standard entry consists largely of photographs from real estate listings for a particular McMansion juxtaposed with Wagner's commentary, using arrows to note features she finds questionable or in poor taste. In addition to individual homes, the website's commentary often extends to the broader perceived material culture of wastefulness represented by McMansions, providing anecdotes of situations when McMansions have been a poor financial investment and offering stand-alone essays on urban planning and architectural history. The blog offers subscriptions with bonus content.

== Reception ==
The blog has acquired many fans, with 65,000 followers in July 2018. Wagner has been interviewed about McMansion Hell by publications including Paper, The Washington Post, Slate, Business Insider, The Hairpin, and Der Spiegel in Germany, and has appeared on the 99% Invisible podcast. She has gained wide name recognition in architectural circles and has written for publications including The Washington Post, Bloomberg, Architectural Digest, The Baffler, The Atlantic, Jacobin, and The New Republic, currently serving as architecture critic for The Nation.

In June 2017, Zillow sent Wagner a letter claiming that McMansion Hell violated Zillow's Terms of Service by "reproducing, modifying, and publicly displaying" content from Zillow listings. The letter also suggested that McMansion Hell was in violation of copyright law, was unprotected by fair use, and by interfering with Zillow's business interests may have been violating the Computer Fraud and Abuse Act. After Wagner obtained legal representation from the Electronic Frontier Foundation, Zillow declined to pursue legal action against McMansion Hell.
