= Renée (disambiguation) =

Renée is a given name or a surname.

Renée or Renee may also refer to:

== People (mononymous) ==
- Renée (writer) (born 1929), New Zealand feminist writer and playwright

== Films ==
- Renee (2012 film)
- Renée, a 2011 made-for-TV documentary film about Renée Richards

== Music ==
=== Albums ===
- Renée Geyer (album)
- Renée Live, Renée Geyer album
- Renee Olstead, self-titled album by Renee Olstead

=== Songs ===
- "Renee" (song), a 1996 song by Lost Boyz
- "Renee", a 2013 song by Sales
- "Renée", a song by Talk Talk on their 1984 album It's My Life
- "Walk Away Renée", a song made popular by the band The Left Banke in 1966

== See also ==
- René
