= The Night of the White Pants =

- Directed by: Amy Talkington
- Written by: Amy Talkington
- Produced by: Anne Harrison; Joey Stewart
- Starring: Tom Wilkinson; Selma Blair; Nick Stahl
- Cinematography: Jim Denault
- Distributed by: Image Entertainment
- Release date: April 27, 2006
- Running time: 87 mins.
- Country: United States
- Language: English
- Budget: USD $4,000,000

The Night of the White Pants is a 2006 comedy drama written and directed by Amy Talkington.

== Plot summary ==
Max Hagan, a Texas oil tycoon, is going through a difficult divorce. When his soon-to-be ex-wife throws him out of his house with nothing but the clothes he's wearing (including the titular "white pants"), he becomes entangled in a sex, drugs and rock-'n'-roll-laden adventure with his daughter's punk-rocker boyfriend as he tries to make things right between himself and his dysfunctional family.

== Main cast ==
- Tom Wilkinson – Max Hagan
- Selma Blair – Beth Hagan
- Nick Stahl – Horace 'Raff' Rafferty
- Frances Fisher – Vivian Hagan
- Janine Turner – Barbara Hagan
- Fran Kranz - Millian Hagan
