= Wallace H. Savage =

American mayor

Wallace Hamilton Savage

45th Mayor of Dallas
- In office 1949–1951
- Preceded by: J. R. Temple
- Succeeded by: Jean Baptiste Adoue

Personal details
- Born: November 21, 1912 Houston, Texas, U.S.
- Died: June 19, 2000 (aged 87) Dallas, Texas, U.S.
- Resting place: Moore Cemetery, Arlington, Texas
- Party: Democratic
- Spouse: Dorothy Minnie Harris
- Relations: Amy Talkington (granddaughter)
- Children: 2, including Virginia Savage McAlester
- Education: University of Virginia, Harvard Law School
- Occupation: Attorney

Military service
- Branch/service: Navy
- Rank: Commander

Wallace Savage (November 21, 1912 – June 19, 2000), attorney, was mayor of Dallas in 1949–1951.

== Biography ==
Savage was born in Houston, Harris, Texas to Homer Hamilton Savage and Mary Wallace. He married Dorothy Minnie Harris, daughter of William R. and Lillie E. Harris on September 17, 1940, in Dallas. They had two daughters: Virginia and Dorothy.

He was in the first graduating class of Woodrow Wilson High School in Dallas. In an oral history interview, Wallace Savage described his mother's influence on his college and career choice. She was from Virginia, attended school in Galveston and graduated from the University of Texas. She received a law degree and was a member of the Texas Bar and American Bar Associations. It was at her suggestion that he attended the University of Virginia and pursue a career in law. He first attended Southern Methodist University, graduated of University of Virginia and later graduated from Harvard Law School.

Savage, assigned to the Eighth Naval District, New Orleans, served in the Pacific during World War II and reached the rank of commander. He served as supply officer on the aircraft carrier USS Manila Bay. He was a member of the American Legion, and Veterans of Foreign Wars.

He became a partner of the law firm of Runge, Lane and Savage in 1946.

During this time, city council elected the mayor from among those councilmen elected by the electorate. The Citizens Charter Association greatly influenced city government. Savage had served as Mayor Pro Tem during the preceding term of office. As mayor, he eliminated the city's segregated ambulance service and sought fair treatment of Dallas' black citizens. The need for more housing for African Americans was an issue of the city council. During his term of office, Central Expressway, the first major freeway in Dallas, was opened.

Savage resigned as chairman of the Dallas county Democratic party to become a candidate for U.S. Representative from Texas 5th District, 1954. He lost to Republican Bruce Alger. He and his wife, Dorothy, lead efforts to preserve the Swiss Avenue Historic area. Mrs. Savage's helped to organize Preservation Dallas which focuses on historic Dallas buildings.

Savage died in Dallas, Texas and was interred at Grove Hill Cemetery, Dallas.
