= Renée Oro =

Argentine pioneering documentarist of the silent era

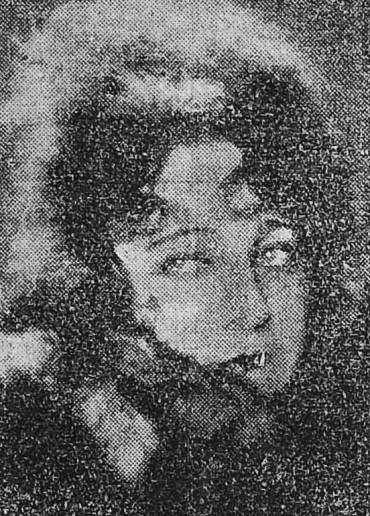
- Oro in a Chilean newspaper, 1923
- Born: René Oro; 1900
- Died: Unknown
- Other names: Renée Oro de Arata
- Occupations: Film director; producer
- Years active: c.1922–1940
- Known for: Pioneer of women's documentary filmmaking
- Spouse: Roberto R. Arata

Renée Oro (1900 — date of death unknown) was an Argentine director and producer who specialized in documentary filmmaking and was mainly active during the silent era of the 1920s. Oro was in charge of the direction, financing, distribution and promotion of her films, which focused on propaganda, geography and local customs. She began her career through the company Arata y Pardo, co-founded by fellow filmmaker Roberto R. Arata, whom she married in the 1930s. Through the promotion of her personal image in the press, Oro soon managed to outshine the company and make a name for herself as a filmmaker. In 1922, she released La Argentina, focused on her country, and after showing it successfully in Chile, she developed a series of films there for President Arturo Alessandri.

After returning to Argentina in 1926, she made a series of documentaries focused on different provinces of the country, which were commissioned by their respective governments. In addition to being screened in the country, these films were made to be sent to different world's fairs and exhibited in the Argentine pavilion; Oro herself was sent as the country's delegate on a few occasions. In 1927, she released a documentary focused on different South American countries titled Las Naciones de América, a film she continued to modify and screen well into the 1930s. In 1931, she also returned to propaganda filmmaking in a documentary commissioned by de facto President José Félix Uriburu.

Oro's career stalled in the 1930s and the last known of her was a failed attempt to produce a biopic on Domingo Faustino Sarmiento in 1939. As of 2022, only three of her films are known to have survived: Tacna y Arica (1924), Las Naciones de América (1927) and Evolución y progresos de la provincia de Santiago del Estero (1927). The latter two were rediscovered in the INCAA's cinematheque archive in 2021, which prompted the first extensive research about her life and career. Since then, Oro has been revalued as a pioneer of Argentine cinema. Her role as a woman filmmaker and as a businesswoman has been celebrated since the documentary genre was almost entirely dominated by men. She is arguably the most prolific woman filmmaker of the silent period in Argentina and possibly Latin America as a whole.

== Life and career ==
=== 1900–1923: Early life and career beginnings ===
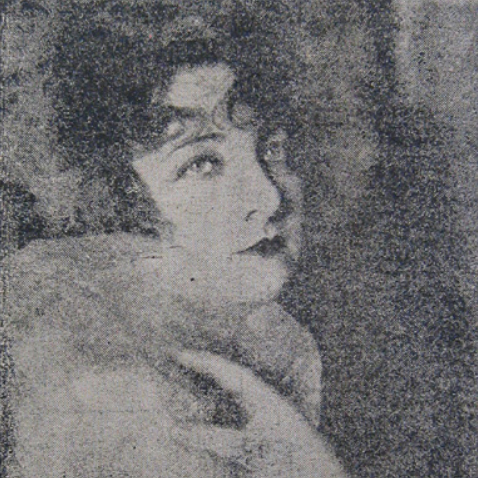
Portrait of Renée Oro published in the Argentine newspaper Última Hora on 28 August 1922.

Most of Renée Oro's biographical data is unknown. In a 2022 research by Lucio Mafud, it was found that she was born in 1900 and was of Argentine nationality, as indicated by the record of a ship that she took from Buenos Aires to Montevideo in 1938. In the 1930s, Oro married documentary film producer Roberto R. Arata and, according to some sources, she had previously worked at his production company as a typist. This company was called Arata y Pardo and was founded in 1919 by brothers Roberto and Antonio Arata along with Felipe Pardo. It mainly focused on making films for private companies and government agencies, although it also made some documentaries on aviation.

Oro's appearance in the field of documentary filmmaking was through Arata y Pardo. In April 1922, she traveled to Europe together with Roberto R. Arata to screen a new film called La Argentina, which showcased "national customs, landscapes and industries". According to La Prensa, they also traveled in order to film scenes for fiction films that would be starred by Oro and directed by Arata. Although they failed to attract European investment for their fiction films, Oro and Arata managed to draw the attention of the Argentine press after La Argentina was screened in Madrid for King Alfonso XIII and the Spanish aristocracy, and in Paris with the support of the newly elected president Marcelo T. de Alvear.

Upon returning to Argentina, several newspapers published a portrait photograph of Oro which presented her as a luxurious movie star. As noted by Mafud: "Her first and last name, which seemed to be confused with an artistic pseudonym, were perfectly suited to this representation, since the adoption of the French variant of the name René gave it an exotic character, and her last name accentuated the brightness and status implicit in the portrait ['Oro' means 'gold' in Spanish]. Although she was characterized in the press as an 'actress and director', she had never acted in any film."

Oro took advantage of the promotion that La Argentina and her own image had in the press, which increasingly emphasized her role as filmmaker and relegated the name of the production company. Since the film did not have a commercial release on the typical exhibition circuit, Oro used this promotion to organize a series of special presentations for politicians, the upper classes, the press and the educational authorities during 1922, and also undertook a tour of the interior of the country in 1923. This series of screenings gave prestige to the film and increased its profitability, since they were announced and commented on by different media. For example, Oro got La Argentina to be screened in schools, penitentiaries, and functions sponsored by provincial governments.

=== 1923–1925: Propaganda work in Chile ===
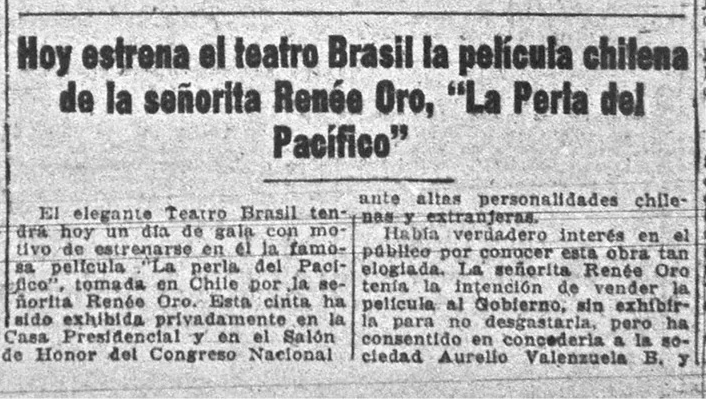
Announcement of the Santiago premiere of La perla del Pacífico published in El Mercurio on 23 July 1924.

In late 1923, Oro travelled to Chile to present La Argentina and upon arrival shot an actuality film of president Arturo Alessandri's tour to the cities of Chillán, Concepción and Talcahuano, with both films premiering at Splendid Theatre in Santiago on December 29 of that year. Known as Jira al sur del Sr. Alessandri, this short film kickstarted an extensive production of documentaries that Oro undertook in Chile under the patronage of President Alessandri. In January 1924, she began the production of La reina del Pacífico (also released as La perla del Pacífico), a five-act documentary promoting Alessandri and showing various cities and landscapes of Chile. It premiered at Splendid Theatre on 26 June 1924 and received rave reviews by the Chilean press. El Mercurio considered it the "greatest effort that has been made in Chile in cinematographic matter", while La Nación described it as a "work executed with an excellent artistic conscience that disappears, through a skilful distribution of the frames, that monotonous and insipid aspect that most of the descriptive reels tend to have."

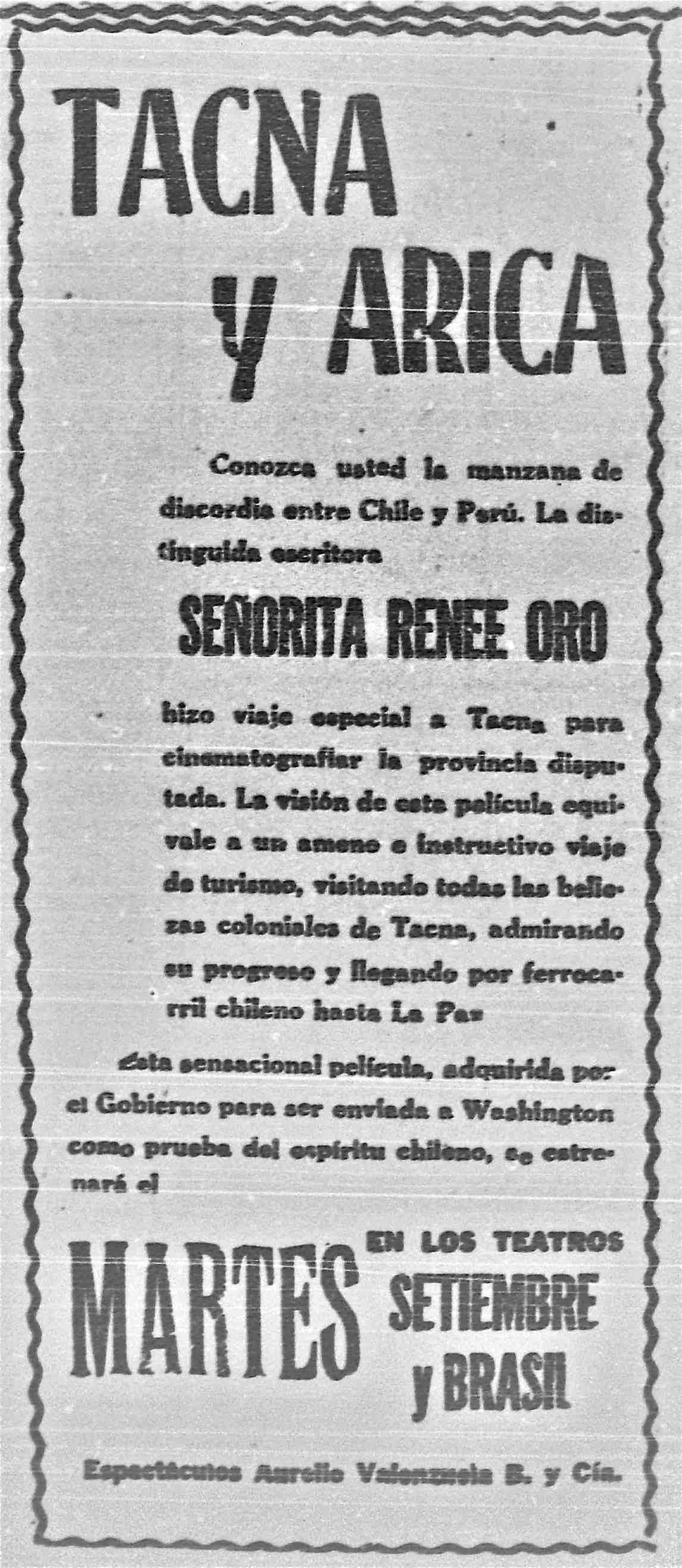
Publicity of the film Tacna y Arica published in La Nación on 18 December 1924.

Shortly after the release of La perla del Pacífico, the Chilean government commissioned Oro to make two short documentary films about the Italian prince Umberto II's state visit to Chile in August 1924. Unlike La Argentina or La perla del pacífico, these films "had to be filmed and released with some haste to satisfy public interest and to compete for the scoop against other film companies"; La llegada del Príncipe Humberto a Chile premiered on 23 August, two days after the official reception of the prince was filmed, and Su Alteza Real Humberto de Savoia en territorio chileno premiered on 30 August, six days after the military parade in Parque Cousiño was filmed. For the former film, Oro enlisted three cameramen and used locomotives, automobiles, and airplanes to record the arrival of the Italian prince.

Also in 1924, Oro made the propaganda feature film Tacna y Arica. Focused on the regions of Tacna and Arica, it was commissioned by the Ministry of Foreign Affairs to be sent to Washington, D.C. in order to "validate Chilean territorial control over those provinces that were in dispute with Peru since the War of the Pacific and whose sovereignty was going to be settled, at that time, at the discretion of the US president." Nevertheless, it first premiered in Santiago on 23 December 1924. The following day, El Mercurio praised the film as: "from a technical point of view, one of the greatest successes of national cinema. Everything in it is correct, and framed within a severe line of perfection that surpasses many of the productions of the same nature that have come to us from abroad."

Oro's career was soon impacted by the transformations in Chilean politics. On 4 September 1924, a military uprising forced Congress to pass a series of progressive laws that the oligarchic political class had refused to pass. The military then demanded that Alessandri dissolve the Congress, but he refused and had to go into exile, with a Military Junta assuming power. On 23 January 1925, a new coup d'état dismissed the Military Junta and allowed Alesssandri to return to finish his term. Oro accompanied Alessandri in part of his exile. In March 1925, an article in Argentine newspaper Última Hora showed the filmmaker traveling on the luxurious ship that Alessandri had reportedly used on his recent trip to Europe; she was heading to Rio de Janeiro to film his trip back to Chile from that city. Titled El viaje de Excmo. señor Alessandri desde Río de Janeiro hasta Chile, this short film showed the "triumphant trip" of the president, beginning with the reception given to him by the Brazilian government, his passage through the cities of São Paulo, Montevideo, Buenos Aires and Mendoza, among others, and finally his arrival at La Moneda Palace. It was released commercially on 20 March 1925, two hours after the president's arrival in Chile, and was screened again the following day with the addition of the images of Alessandri arriving at La Moneda.

Oro's final Chilean film was El corazón de los Andes, which was only screened in Santiago on 28 April 1925. It showcased various cities and areas of Argentina and Chile, including the Argentine beach resorts of Mar del Plata and Necochea, as well as Southern Chile. Oro's career in Chile came to an end after Alessandri's resignation on 1 October, after which she returned to Argentina a few days later. Mafud wrote: "The gradual weakening of Alessandri's political power and his subsequent resignation from the presidency as a result of tensions with sectors of the Army that were part of the same government probably contributed to the end of a film production that was at the service of his politics and was sponsored by his government."

=== 1926–1930: Resumption of her career in Argentina ===
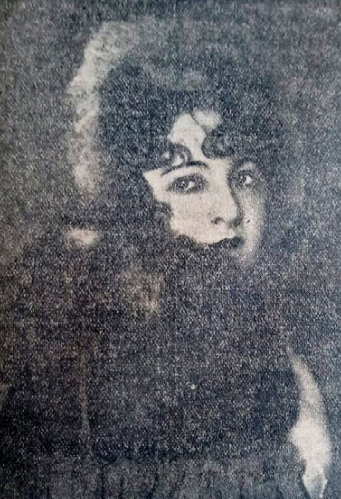
Portrait of Oro published in the Entre Ríos newspaper El Diario on 10 November 1926.

Upon her return to Argentina in 1926, Oro resumed her work as film director and businesswoman in the country, making a series of documentaries for the national government and that of different provinces. In January, La Razón reported that she would make a film at the request of the police of the city of Buenos Aires, although no evidence has been found that it was actually filmed. In November, she shot two documentaries requested by the governments of Santa Fe Province and Entre Ríos Province. These were Actividades de la Provincia de Santa Fe, which premiered in early December 1926 at the Colón theatre of Santa Fe; and Entre Ríos, sus industrias y su progreso, which was screened on 30 December 1926 at the Cine Palace 9 de Julio in Paraná.

Throughout 1927, Oro made at least three more documentaries at the request of the provincial governments of Corrientes, Santiago del Estero and Salta. The first one was Evolución y progresos de la provincia de Corrientes, which was finished in mid-February 1927 and premiered in April at the Teatro Vera in Corrientes. In August, the government of Corrientes ordered that screenings be organized for students of the province's schools, the general public and in neighboring towns, in order to "promote the wealth of the province". Oro later filmed Evolución y progresos de la provincia de Santiago del Estero and Evolución y progresos de la provincia de Salta, the latter being screened on 30 October 1928 at the Grand Splendid Theatre in Buenos Aires. It is very likely that the director also made documentaries for the provinces of San Juan, Mendoza and Jujuy, although no evidence has been found to confirm it actually happened.

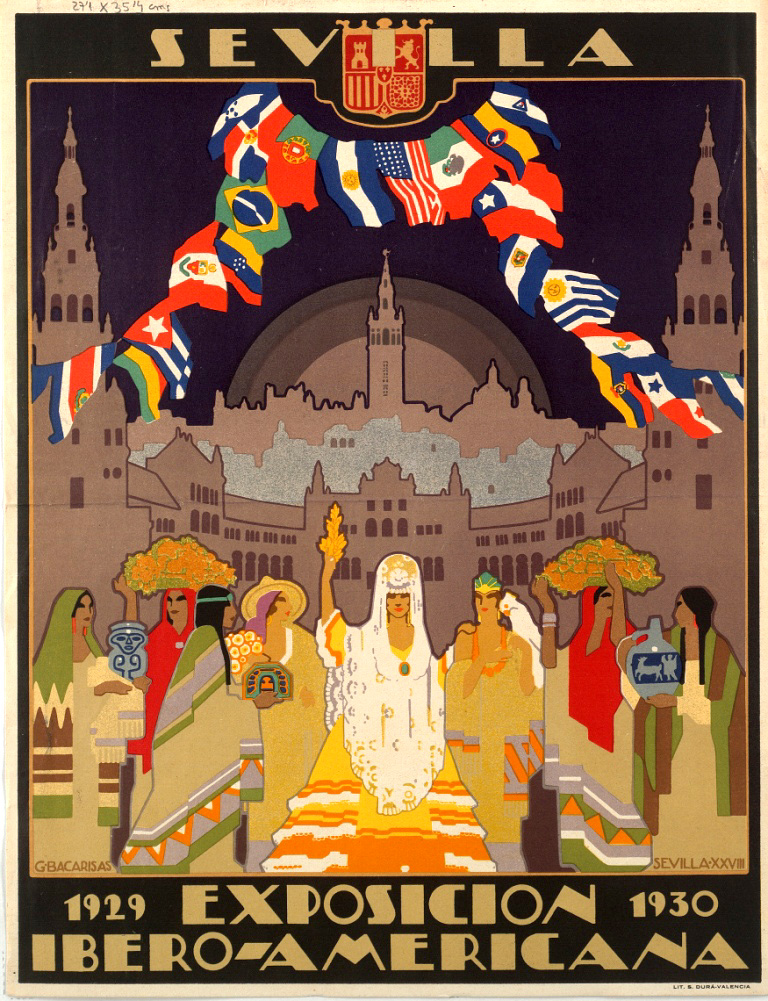
Poster for the Ibero-American Exposition of 1929, where Oro participated as a delegate from Argentina.

In addition to being released in their respective provinces or at special screenings in Buenos Aires, these films were made to be sent to different world's fairs. These included the 1926 Sesquicentennial Exposition in Philadelphia, the 1927 International Trade Fair in Milan and the 1929 Ibero-American Exposition in Seville. In this type of fairs, "participating countries organized their own pavilions, where their ministries, state agencies, provincial governments, and business associations promoted distinctive aspects of their social, cultural, and commercial organization. These national pavilions used to have a section of graphic, photographic and film propaganda designed to highlight the particularities of each country." Oro personally traveled as a delegate from Argentina to the world's fairs in Milan and Seville, likely financed by the governments of Corrientes for the former and of Salta for the latter.

In 1927, Oro also premiered her feature documentary Las Naciones de América, which included segments dedicated to Argentina, Chile, Brazil, Bolivia and Peru, and aimed to "universally disseminate knowledge of the life and customs of the South American countries, as well as their main sources of production, panoramic beauties, etc." Composed of archival material that Oro shot at different times in the past (including her previous film La Argentina), Las Naciones de América premiered on 26 September 1927 at the Grand Splendid in Buenos Aires, in a special event organized by the director herself on the anniversary of the Independence of Chile. A second screening took place at the Gaumont Theatre on 11 October 1927, in an event that included numbers of regional songs and dances by Argentine, Chilean, Brazilian and Bolivian artists. Over the years, Oro made several modifications to the original documentary, adding material that was filmed in other locations or updating the information to refer to recent events in Latin American society and politics. Oro continuing to organize screenings of La Argentina throughout the 1930s.

=== 1931–1940: Final work ===
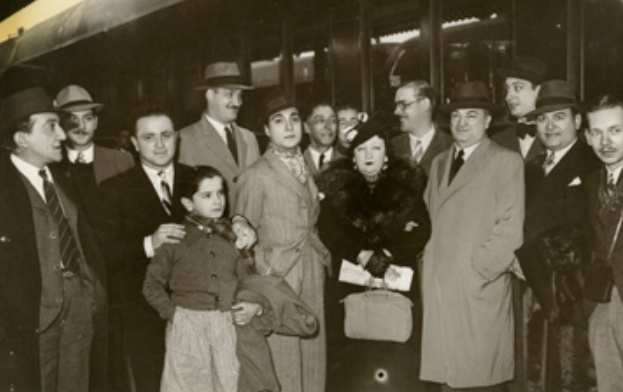
Oro posing with actor Héctor Coire (left), one of the protagonists of the film La vida del gran Sarmiento, before embarking on a trip to San Juan with the film crew in May 1940.

In 1931, Oro made the propaganda film Jira presidencial a las provincias del Norte, which followed dictator José Félix Uriburu in his tour through Salta, Jujuy, Tucumán and Córdoba. The style of the film was similar to the propaganda work she had previously done for Chilean President Alessandri. According to Mafud, this showed that "Renée Oro's cinema promoted the political power of the day, either a reformist government like Alessandri's or a proto-fascist project like Uriburu's. Although it was a production financed by the director herself, it is very likely that with this type of documentaries she tried to get the government, as had happened in Chile, to commission her to make other films that publicized the actions of the executive branch." Jira presidencial a las provincias del Norte premiered on 7 April 1931 at the Astral theatre in Buenos Aires along with Howard Hughes' war film Hell's Angels, in a ceremony attended by Uriburu, diplomats and members of high society. It was well received by critics, including those from La Razón and La Película.

In 1932, Oro travelled through locations in Buenos Aires Province and shot the documentary La provincia de Buenos Aires en el cincuentenario de la fundación de la ciudad de La Plata, which premiered on 9 June in La Plata. The film included footage of Mar del Plata, Miramar, Necochea, Bahía Blanca, Tres Arroyos, Sierra de la Ventana, Colonel Suárez, Olavarría, Azul and Tandil, among other towns of the province. The advertisements for the film claimed that it was a "first series" and that Oro would make another documentary with more locations in Buenos Aires Province. It was also reported that La provincia de Buenos Aires... would be part of a larger film titled La República Argentina en el año 1932, which would be screened abroad. Nevertheless, researchers have not been able to confirm that these projects were carried out.

Oro's career as a documentarist stagnated in the 1930s. A new documentary focused on the Jewish community in Argentina was announced in 1933, although evidence suggests that it never came to fruition. Her name reappears in 1939 as a fiction film producer, when she founded the company Sociedad Argentina de Grandes Films with the intention of making an "elevated production, which allows the national and foreign public to know the multiple motifs offered by the Argentine historical, literary and musical environment." Oro was the president of the company, while her husband Roberto Arata held the position of managing director. The shooting of their first project, a biopic on Domingo Faustino Sarmiento titled La vida del gran Sarmiento, began in May 1940 in San Juan Province and continued in Rosario. However, filming was soon suspended, which caused Héctor Coire, one of the protagonists, to sue the company for damages the following month. In October 1940, the Ministry of Justice detected irregularities in the company and revoked the authorization that allowed its operation. The unfinished film appears to have marked the end of Oro's film career.

== Rediscovery and legacy ==
External videos
- Published by the INCAA on YouTube on 4 January 2023.
- Las Naciones de América (1927), restored in 2022 by the INCAA.

Oro's figure has been virtually unknown in the history of Argentine cinema. Only a few researchers from the 21st century briefly mention some of her Argentine films, among them Irene Marrone (2003), César Maranghello (2005), Natacha Mell (2012) and Fernando San Martín (2016). More recently, the book Sucesos recobrados (2021) by Ximena Vergara, Antonia Krebs and Marcelo Morales, and the website Cinechile.cl "provided extremely valuable information and journalistic reviews that allow us to delve into her film production made in [Chile]", although her "figure continued to be diffuse, almost elusive."

In 2021, nitrocellulose copies of Oro's films Las Naciones de América (1927) and Evolución y progresos de la provincia de Santiago del Estero (1927) were found in the INCAA's cinematheque during an inventory update on its warehouses. The only other film by Oro that is known to have survived is Tacna y Arica (1924), found in Peru. Upon the discovery, a project of preservation and digitization of the copies began, as well as a historical investigation about the filmmaker. It was a joint initiative between the INCAA's cinematheque, the "Beatriz A. Zuccolillo de Gaffet" Archive (which depends on the INCAA and the ENERC film school) and the Mar del Plata International Film Festival.

The resulting book, Por las naciones de América. El cine documental silente de Renée Oro (estudio histórico y técnico), includes a historical research by Lucio Mafud and a technical study of the films by the INCAA's cinematheque team members Georgina Tosi, Mariana Avramo, Daniela Cuatrin, Jazmín Adrover and July Massaccesi. It was presented in November 2022 at the 37th Mar del Plata International Film Festival, where the restored versions of Las Naciones de América and Evolución y progresos de la provincia de Santiago del Estero were also screened.

Following the 2022 research, Oro has been revalued as a pioneering figure in the history of Argentine cinema. Her role as a woman filmmaker has been celebrated, as the documentary genre in which she specialized was overwhelmingly male-dominated. The silent period in which Oro's career took place was characterized by an important presence of women filmmakers, something that would disappear with the arrival of sound films and the subsequent consolidation of the industry. However, she differed from her peers for dedicating herself to a genre with an absence of female figures and for the high number of productions she made. Oro is the most prolific silent film director and producer from Argentina and possibly Latin America as a whole. In an interview, Avramo described her as a "pioneer in the world of women documentarists. Not only as a director: also because of her way of working and producing. She was a producer and editor, very complete for the time."

In addition to her role as director, Oro has been praised for her skill as a businesswoman. As noted by Mafud:

Renée Oro used the promotion of her figure and her films in the daily press to obtain financing for her documentary production from the State and the provincial governments, as well as to organize an exhibition scheme, in general, alternative to the commercial exhibition circuit. She built the image of a celebrity, appearing at certain times in national and international newspapers as a film actress, with her corresponding artistic photography that represented her as a Hollywood diva, and other times as a "writer" and "intellectual". She also showed herself as a woman of the great world who rubbed shoulders with kings, presidents, diplomats and the upper classes of Europe and South America. (...)

[She] appealed to a production scheme that sought to obtain maximum utility from each film, often incorporating fragments of her previous documentaries into her new films. She was also in charge of managing the exhibition of her own work, in general, in special functions, which, in turn, allowed her to publicize her work in search of new clients who commissioned her to film institutional documentaries. (...)

Her entrepreneurial skills and her self-promotion capacity allowed her to position herself, many times, above other producers with greater infrastructure that competed to obtain contracts with the State and the governorates. (...)

In the context of a documentary cinema filmed entirely by men, Renée Oro managed to make filmmaking an economically profitable profession.

For this she had to deploy multiple abilities; She not only directed her films, but managed the production and financing of her, organized exhibitions and managed her promotion in the press media, with an undeniable talent for public relations.

== Filmography ==
Restored print of Tacna y Arica (1924).

- La Argentina (1922)
- Jira al sur del Sr. Alessandri (or Jira al sur del Presidente de la República) (1923)
- La llegada del Príncipe Humberto a Chile (or La llegada del Príncipe Humberto de Saboya) (1924)
- Su Alteza Real Humberto de Savoia en territorio chileno (1924)
- La perla del Pacífico (or La reina del Pacífico) (1924)
- Tacna y Arica (1924)
- El viaje del Excmo. señor Alessandri desde Río de Janeiro hasta Chile (or El viaje del Presidente Alessandri) (1925)
- El corazón de los Andes (1925)
- Actividades de la Provincia de Santa Fe (1926)
- Entre Ríos, sus industrias y su progreso (1926)
- Evolución y progresos de la provincia de Corrientes (1927)
- Evolución y progresos de la provincia de Santiago del Estero (1927)
- Las Naciones de América (1927)
- Evolución y progresos de la provincia de Salta (1928)
- Jira presidencial a las provincias del Norte (1931)
- La provincia de Buenos Aires en el cincuentenario de la fundación de la ciudad de La Plata (1932)

== See also ==
- Cinema of Chile
- List of female film and television directors
- Women's cinema

== Bibliography ==
- Mafud, Lucio; Tosi, Georgina; Avramo, Mariana; Cuatrin, Daniela; Adrover, Jazmín; Massaccesi, July (2022). Por las naciones de América. El cine documental silente de Renée Oro (estudio histórico y técnico) (PDF). Festival Internacional de Cine de Mar del Plata (in Spanish). Buenos Aires: Instituto Nacional de Cine y Artes Audiovisuales (INCAA). ISBN 978-987-3998-16-4.
