= Hockaday School =

Girls prep school in Dallas, Texas, US

The Hockaday School

Location
- 11600 Welch Road; Dallas, Texas 75229; United States; 32.9074°N 96.8272°W

Information
- Type: Private, independent, day school
- Motto: Virtus Scientia (Virtue through knowledge)
- Established: 1913
- Founder: Ela Hockaday
- Headmistress: Laura Leathers
- Grades: PK–12
- Gender: Female
- Enrollment: 1114
- Colors: Green, white
- Athletics conference: SPC
- Website: www.hockaday.org

The Hockaday School is an independent, secular, college preparatory day school for girls Pre-K through 12 located in Dallas, Texas, United States. The Hockaday School is accredited by the Independent Schools Association of the Southwest.

== History ==
The school was founded in 1913 by Ela Hockaday in response to a group of Dallas businessmen's demand to pioneer an academic institution for their daughters, one equal to that of their sons’ educational experiences. She added a junior college in 1931 which operated until 1951. The first class consisted of only ten students. Sarah Trent was one of the first teachers at the school and was influential in its development. As of the 1940 census, Ela Hockaday was living at the school that was located in the block between 5601 Bonita and 2407 Greenville Avenue in Dallas.

After Miss Hockaday's death in 1956, J. Erik Jonsson set in motion a campaign for a new campus. Karl Hoblitzelle donated 100 acres in North Dallas, which became the site of Hockaday's third and present-day campus in 1961.

The school announced in 2021 that it would phase out the boarding option by 2025.

== Tuition ==
The tuition averages $36,705 for upper school day students (not including books). For resident students, costs are approximately $62,828 – $64,191. Financial aid is granted on the basis of demonstrated family need and the school's availability of funds. In the 2019–2020 school year, 13% of the Hockaday student body received financial aid.

== Athletics ==
Hockaday competes in the Southwest Preparatory Conference (SPC) in 11 sports: basketball, cross-country, field hockey, golf, lacrosse, soccer, softball, swimming and diving, tennis, track and field, and volleyball.

In addition, they compete in crew (rowing) and fencing.

== Publications ==
Hockaday's mass communication publications are student-run and designed. They produce the newspaper, Fourcast, once a month and the literary magazine, Vibrato, once a year.

Vibrato has won national awards, including the Gold Crown Award (CSPA), Pacemaker Award (NSPA), and Best in Show (NSPA), through Columbia Scholastic Press Association and National Scholastic Press Association.

== Notable alumnae ==
Since 2010, five Hockaday graduates have gone to post-graduate study at the University of Oxford as Rhodes Scholars, an award that goes to only 32 students per year.

=== Individual alumnae ===
- Jay Presson Allen, 1940. Screenwriter, playwright, novelist.
- Barbara Pierce Bush, attended but left before high school. Co-founder and president, Global Health Corps. Presidential daughter.
- Dixie Carter, 1982. Businesswoman; former president of Total Nonstop Action / Impact Wrestling.
- Victoria Clark, 1978. Tony award-winning singer and actress.'
- Rita Crocker Clements, 1949. Republican Party organizer, First Lady of Texas.
- Deborah Coonts. Romantic mystery novelist and lawyer.
- Frances Farenthold, 1942. Politician, lawyer, activist.
- Farrah Forke, 1986. Actress. Wings, Lois and Clark: The New Adventures of Superman
- Jenna Bush Hager, attended but left before high school. Author, Ana's Story: A Journey of Hope. Presidential daughter.
- Amanda Havard, 2004. Novelist.
- Lyda Hill, 1960. Businesswoman, philanthropist.
- Caroline Rose Hunt, 1941. Founder, Rosewood Hotels & Resorts. Writer. Philanthropist.
- Helen LaKelly Hunt, 1967. Writer, psychotherapist, philanthropist
- June Hunt, 1965. Bible-based counselor and radio personality. Philanthropist.
- Swanee Hunt, 1968. Ambassador to Austria, Harvard lecturer, photographer, philanthropist.
- Nasreen Pervin Huq, 1976. Activist and campaigner for women's rights and social justice
- Annemarie Jacir, 1992. Palestinian filmmaker and poet
- Lisa Loeb, 1986. Singer-songwriter.
- Dorothy Malone, 1943. Actor
- Anne Windfohr Marion, President of Burnett Ranches and Chairman of Burnett Oil Company.
- Frances Mossiker, 1922. Historical novelist
- Anne W. Patterson, 1967. Assistant Secretary of State for Near Eastern Affairs
- Renee Peck, 1971. Journalist.
- Dawn Prestwich, 1978. Television producer and screenwriter.
- Patricia Richardson, 1968. Actor. Home Improvement
- Holland Roden, 2005. Teen Wolf, 12 Miles of Bad Road, Lost
- Harriet Schock, 1958. Songwriter
- Amy Talkington. Filmmaker, screenwriter.
- Lyda Ann Thomas, 1954. Mayor of Galveston, Texas.
- Brenda Vaccaro. Actress.
- Pamela Willeford, 1968. Former U.S. Ambassador to Switzerland and Liechtenstein.
