= Executive home =

Houses with higher-than-average price and quality

An executive home is a type of house that is intended to provide its occupant with higher-than-average levels of comfort, quality and convenience. It is a property which a person or family can afford to purchase later on, often using a combination of savings and mortgage financing. In the real estate industry, the term commonly denotes large four to six bedroom houses, often older homes but sometimes high-cost new developments.

== Definition ==
An executive home is a marketing euphemism for a moderately large and well-appointed house.

Executive homes are usually constructed among homes of very similar size and type by a subdivider on speculation; they are generally built en-masse by development companies to be marketed as premium real estate. Executive homes can differ from traditional mansions mostly in their parcel size, since many of these newer homes are built on increasingly small lots, so developers can maximize available acreage.

Executive homes are generally found in outlying suburban areas because lot sizes in older neighborhoods generally are not conducive to new residences of this large scale.

== History ==
Executive houses were formerly described as mansionettes or bijou residences. The word mansion historically denotes homes with more character than an average executive home. Executive homes have much in common with mansions in a traditional sense including large amounts of interior and exterior space.

== Design ==
=== United Kingdom ===
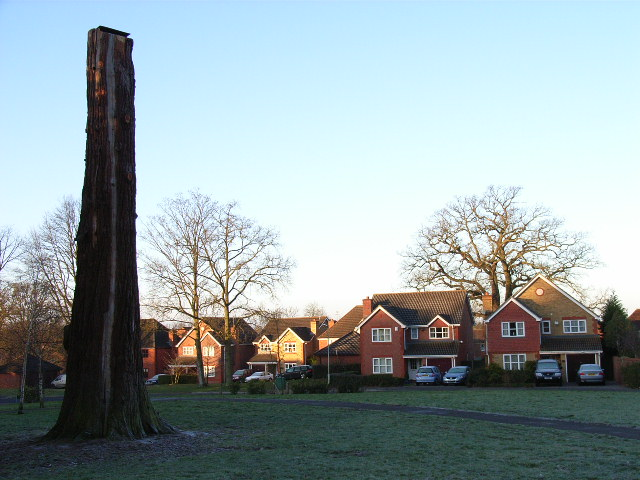
Keephatch Park in Wokingham, England is an executive housing estate mostly built by Taylor Woodrow in the 1990s

In the United Kingdom, executive homes often comprise over 2,000 sq ft (198 sq m) of space and can be spread over two to four floors, may include underfloor heating on the ground floor, separate porches, large living rooms with fireplaces, separate dining rooms, large kitchen/diners or kitchens with breakfast rooms attached and both with granite or quartz worktops, utility rooms, downstairs studies, at least four double bedrooms with at least one en-suite, marble bathrooms and double or triple garages with driveways to park at least two cars.

=== United States of America ===
In the United States, executive homes have similar features including a two - four story plan, can have four or more bedrooms with three or more bathrooms, and powder rooms, main floor family rooms ancillary rooms such as loggias, breezeways, porte cocheres, foyers, atriums, libraries, game rooms, home theaters, pool houses, guest houses, wine cellars, gourmet kitchens and other single-use rooms.

Some of these types of houses include a mix of Rapunzel towers, marble columns, fanciful mixes of garish architectural features, many in a gated community with high security walls to keep out prying eyes, and elaborate entry gates with security details. Executive homes frequently have two or more fireplaces, multi-car garages, and sometimes full finished or unfinished basements. Designed to appeal to buyers at the top end of the property market, the large executive properties are in the highest percentage of size for residences in an area (usually over 4000 sq ft\398 sq m) and are situated on large lots, golf courses or sometimes gentleman's ranches of many acres.

== Criticism ==
There have been many instances of developers buying large lots or multiple lots in historic neighborhoods, demolishing the older homes and building executive homes. This may have the effect of destroying the setting of older neighborhoods, and adversely impacting the integrity of historic districts. These lots are in desirable neighborhoods, and desirable school districts, and are close to urban centers, so the trend will likely continue. However, some communities such as Wellesley, Massachusetts and Austin, Texas have created policies and ordinances to retain older neighborhoods against these development pressures.

== See also ==
- Luxury apartment
- Penthouse apartment
