= Frances Mossiker =

American biographer

- Born: Frances Sanger; April 9, 1906; Dallas, Texas
- Died: May 12, 1985 (aged 79)
- Education: Barnard College; Southern Methodist University
- Occupation: Biographer
- Spouse(s): Frank Beaston 1922-1929; Jake Mossiker 1935-1984

Frances Sanger Mossiker (April 9, 1906 – May 12, 1985) was an American writer best known for her historical biographies.

== Biography ==
Frances Mossiker was born in Dallas, Texas on April 9, 1906, the daughter of Elihu and Evelyn Beekman; her father was of the Sanger family, owners of the Texas retail chain Sanger Brothers. As she was growing up, she often visited her mother's family in France, and became fluent in French and German. She attended the Hockaday School and Forest Avenue High School and, at 15, attempted to join the circus. She enrolled at Smith College but, according to school policy, had to leave when, at 16, she eloped with her first husband, the actor Frank Beaston. She moved to Barnard College in New York, and graduated Phi Beta Kappa in 1927. She did some graduate work at the Sorbonne in Paris, after which she and her husband moved to Detroit and then Los Angeles. Mossiker and Beaston divorced in 1929, without having children, and she returned to Dallas.

In 1933, Mossiker got a job as a book reviewer for the Dallas Morning News, and aired her reviews on her own segment on KGKO Fort Worth's "Woman's World". In October 1935, she married businessman Jake Mossiker (1899–1984); they had no children and spent a good deal of time traveling. In the late 1950s, she had to have a mastectomy and, while recovering, began writing the story of the Affair of the Diamond Necklace; she used her connections in France to gain access to primary documents. The result was the 1961 book The Queen's Necklace: Marie Antoinette and the Scandal That Shocked and Mystified France, and Mossiker became the first woman to win the Carr P. Collins award from the Texas Institute of Letters. The book also won a Matrix Award from the Theta Sigma Phi National Fraternity for Women in Journalism. Five additional biographies followed and her combination of painstaking research and lively writing style made her books best-sellers, in North America and in Europe. Her 1965 book Napoleon and Josephine, the Biography of a Marriage also won the Collins award. For her last book,Madame de Sévigné: A Life and Letters (1983), she became the first person to translate the Sévigné letters into English, and to write a book about Sévigné in English.

In 1972, Mossiker earned a Doctorate of Letters from Southern Methodist University. She established the Jacob & Frances Sanger Mossiker Chair in English at SMU and the Jacob & Frances Sanger Mossiker Chair in the Humanities at the University of Texas at Austin. She died of heart disease in Dallas on May 12, 1985 and donated her papers to the Harry Ransom Humanities Research Center at the University of Texas at Austin, to Boston University, and to Smith College.

== Bibliography ==
- The Queen's Necklace: Marie Antoinette and the Scandal That Shocked and Mystified France, 1961
- Napoleon and Josephine, the Biography of a Marriage, 1965
- The Affair of the Poisons, 1969
- More Than a Queen: The Story of Josephine Bonaparte, 1971
- Pocahontas: The Life and the Legend, 1976
- Madame de Sévigné: A Life and Letters, 1983
