= Typist =

Typist is a person who types, a clerical worker who writes documents, using a typewriter.

== Skills and occupations ==
Typist may also refer to:

- Data entry clerk, someone who types data into a database via a computer or terminal.
- Audio typist, someone who types letters, books and other documents using an audio source (e.g. dictaphone)
- Copy typist, someone who types letters, books and other documents using printed or handwritten sources.
- Shorthand typist, someone who uses a high speed writing system to record speech.

== Other ==
- Typist, someone who discriminates against others based on their association with a standard social construction.
