= Vicary House =

Vicary House may refer to:

- Vicary House (Canton, Ohio), listed on the NRHP in Stark County, Ohio
- Captain William Vicary House, listed on the NRHP in Beaver County, Pennsylvania

== See also ==
- Vicarage, or clergy house
