= J. R. Temple =

American politician

James Roland "Jimmie" Temple

44th Mayor of Dallas
- In office 1947–1949
- Preceded by: Woodall Rodgers
- Succeeded by: Wallace H. Savage

Personal details
- Born: November 27, 1899 Midlothian, Texas, U.S.
- Died: November 16, 1980 (aged 80) Dallas, Texas, U.S.
- Resting place: Grove Hill Cemetery, Dallas, Texas
- Party: Democratic
- Spouse: Jessebelle Barry
- Occupation: Dairy business

Military service
- Allegiance: United States
- Branch/service: United States Army
- Battles/wars: World War I

James Roland Temple (November 27, 1899 – November 16, 1980), dairyman, was mayor of Dallas in 1947–1949.

== Biography ==
James Roland Temple was born on November 27, 1899, in Midlothian, Texas, to Walter Calvin Temple and Angelina Elizabeth Pearson. He married Jessebelle Barry, granddaughter of Bryan T. Barry, a previous Dallas mayor, on June 11, 1923, in Dallas. They had three children: Joan Elizabeth, James Barry and Walter C.

He served for a year in the U.S. Army during World War I and then attended the University of Texas for two years before quitting to pursue family and career. He was first employed with an automobile distributor and later worked for Ford Motor Company. He spend six years with Southland Ice Company (the parent company of 7-Eleven) and vice-president and president of Oak Farms Ltd. He was elected as mayor with the support of the Citizens Charter Association, an organization instrumental in establishing the manager-council form of city government.

He was a Freemason and a member of the Hella Temple Shrine. He was active in the community giving service through the Dallas Sales Executive Club, the Oak Cliff Chamber of Commerce, and Oak Cliff Lions Club.

Temple died on November 16, 1980, in Dallas, Texas, and was interred at Grove Hill Cemetery, Dallas.
