= Penthouse apartment =

Attached unit on the top floor of a building

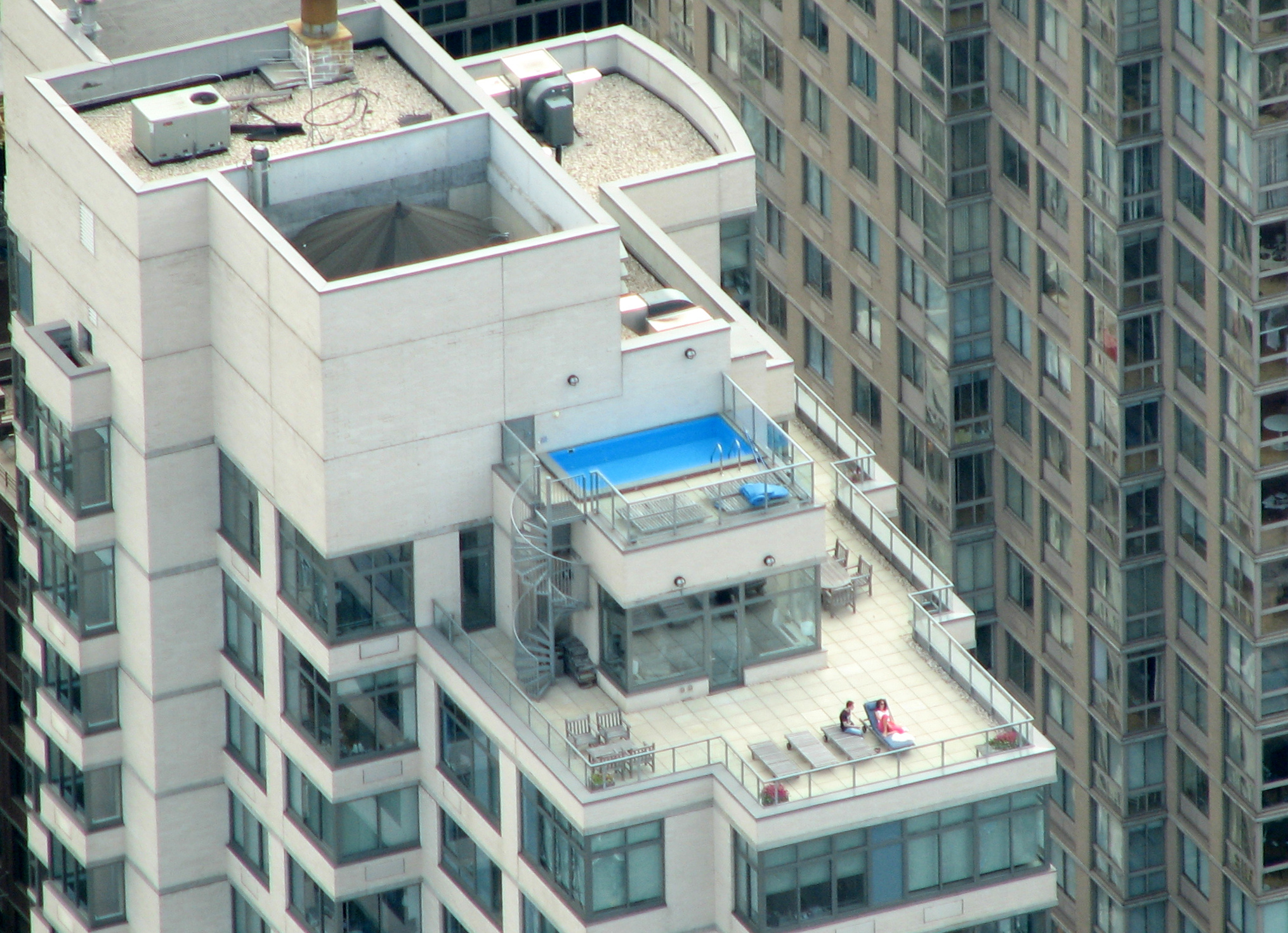
A Manhattan penthouse with swimming pool, as viewed from the Empire State Building observation deck.

A penthouse is an apartment or housing unit traditionally on the highest floor of an apartment building, condominium, hotel, or tower. The term "penthouse" originally referred, and sometimes still does refer, to a separate smaller "house" that was constructed on the roof of an apartment building. Architecturally, it refers specifically to a structure on the roof of a building that is set back from its outer walls. These structures do not have to occupy the entire roof deck.

Recently, high rise luxury apartment buildings have begun to designate multiple units on the entire top residential floor or multiple higher residential floors including the top floor as penthouse apartments, and outfit them to include ultra-luxury fixtures, finishes, and designs which are different from all other residential floors of the building. These penthouse apartments are not typically set back from the building's outer walls, but are instead flush with the rest of the building and simply differ in size, luxury, and consequently price. High-rise buildings can also have structures known as mechanical penthouses that enclose machinery or equipment such as the drum mechanisms for an elevator.

== Etymology ==
The name penthouse is derived from apentis, an Old French word meaning "attached building" or "appendage". The modern spelling is influenced by a 16th-century folk etymology that combines the Middle French word for "slope" (pente) with the English noun house (the meaning at that time was "attached building with a sloping roof or awning").

== Development ==
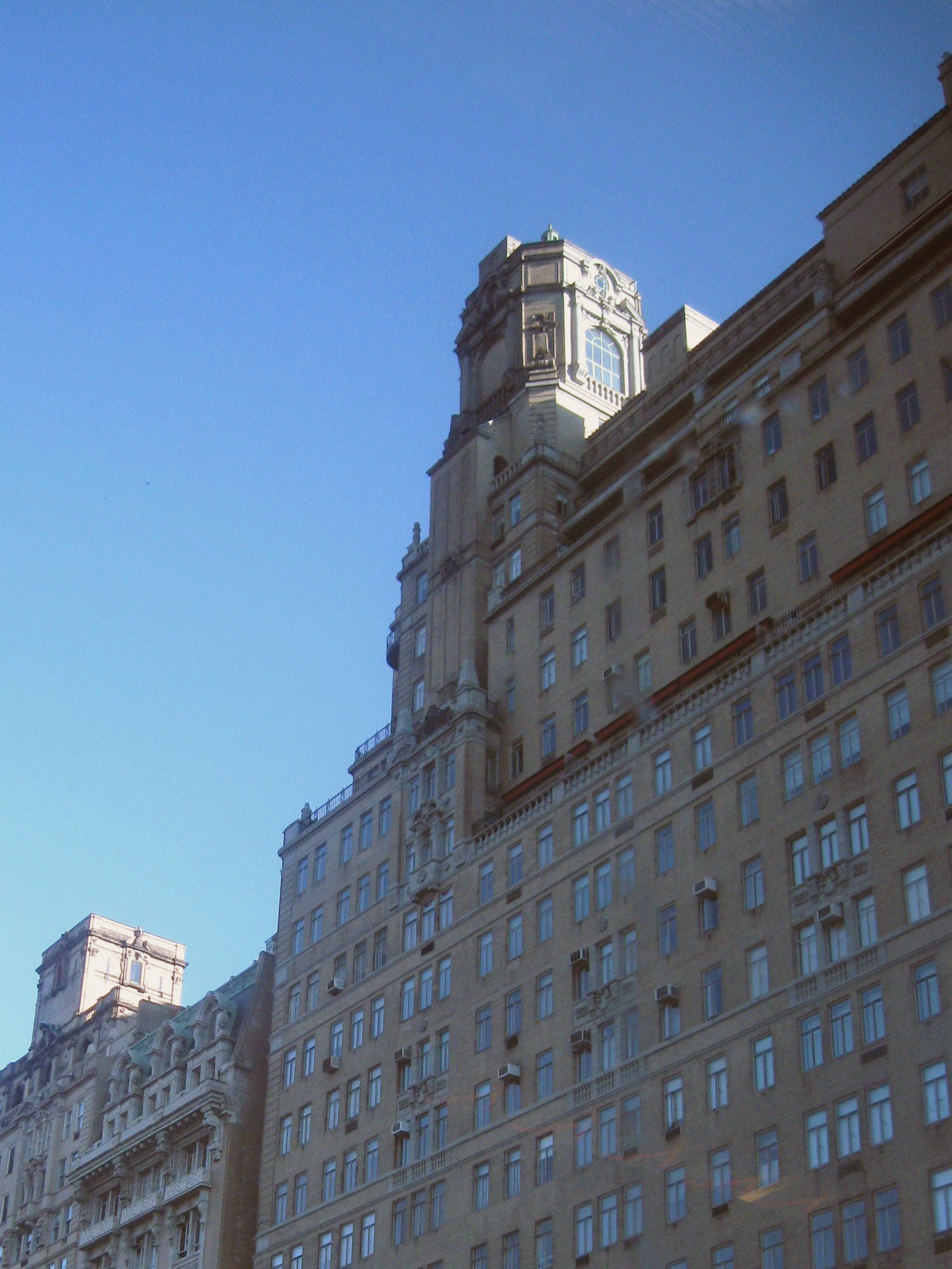
Penthouse apartment at the top of a building on the Upper West Side, New York City, New York.

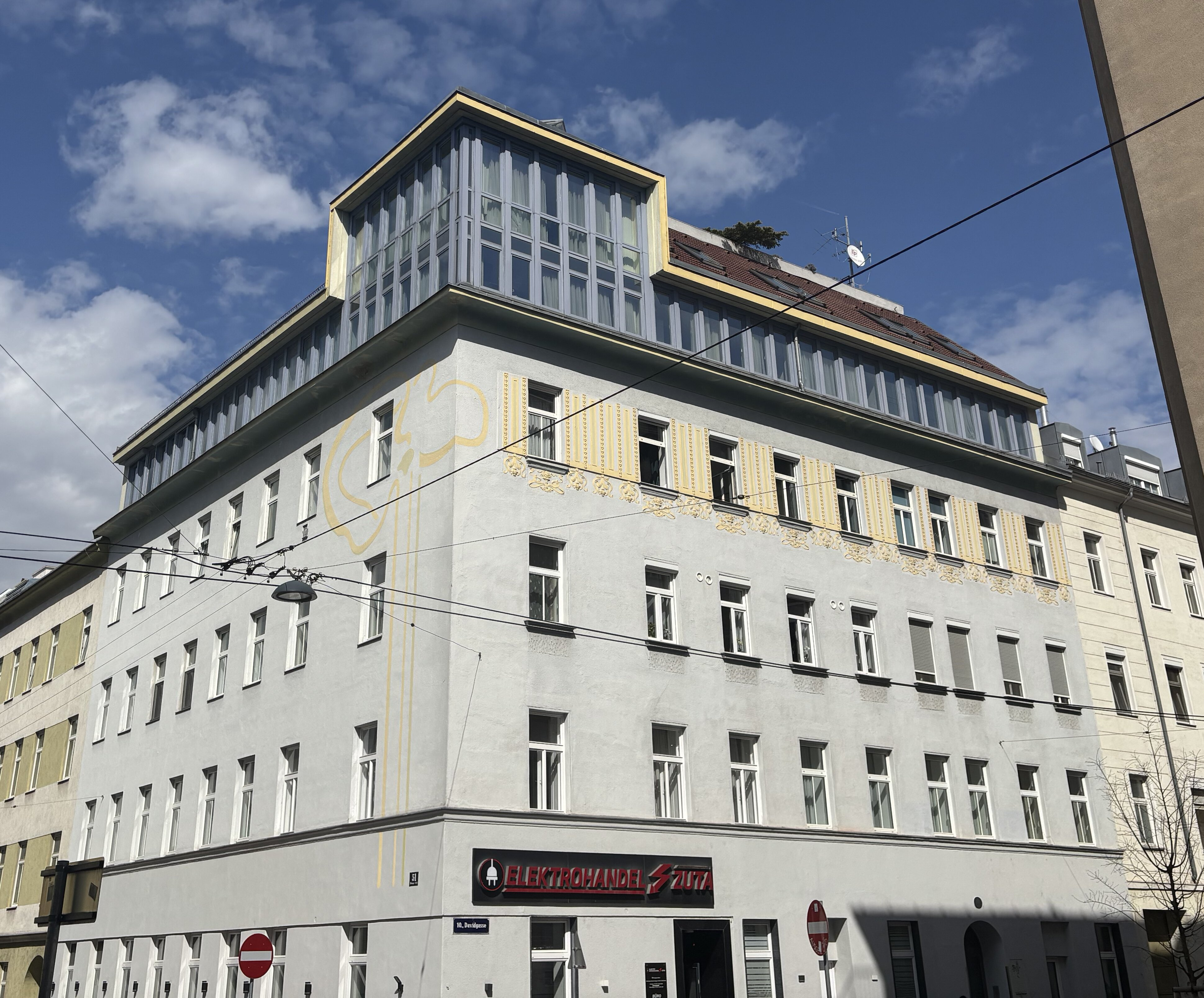
Penthouse built on an existing building as an attic extension in Vienna, Austria.

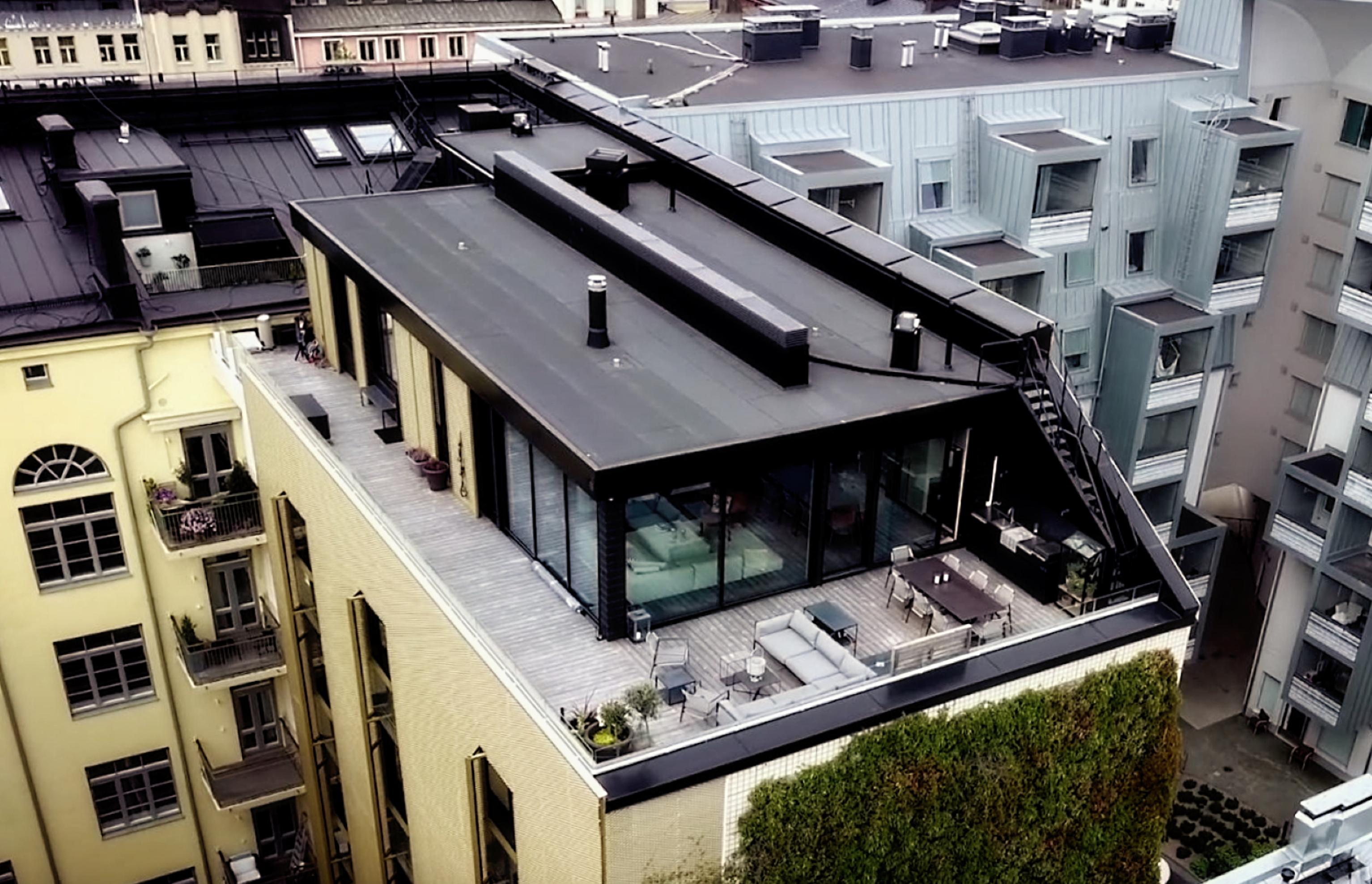
Penthouse apartment in Ullanlinna Helsinki, Finland.

Penthouses first appeared in US cities in the 1920s with the exploitation of roof spaces for upscale property. The first recognized development was atop the Plaza Hotel overlooking Central Park in New York City in 1923. Its success caused a rapid development of similar luxury penthouse apartments in most major cities in the United States in the following years.

The popularity of penthouses stemmed from the setbacks allowing for significantly larger private outdoor terrace spaces than traditional cantilevered balconies. Due to the desirability of having outdoor space, buildings began to be designed with setbacks that could accommodate the development of apartments and terraces on their uppermost levels.

Penthouses are very popular in Europe. There is a trend in many European cities with stringent construction regulations for monument preservation, to build penthouse apartments on top of existing older buildings. Attics are often excluded from monument preservation limitations and offer a way for city administrations to provide additional construction space to increase density in historic centers.

Modern penthouses may or may not have terraces. Upper floor space may be divided among several apartments, or a single apartment may occupy an entire floor. Penthouses often have their own private access where access to any roof, terrace, and any adjacent setback is exclusively controlled.

== Design ==
Penthouses can also differentiate themselves by luxurious amenities such as high-end appliances, finest materials fitting, luxurious flooring system, and more.

Features not found in the majority of apartments in the building may include a private entrance or elevator, or higher/vaulted ceilings. In buildings consisting primarily of single level apartments, penthouse apartments may be distinguished by having two or more levels. They may also have such features as a terrace, fireplace, more floor area, oversized windows, multiple master suites, den/office space, hot-tubs, and more. They might be equipped with luxury kitchens featuring stainless steel appliances, granite counter-tops, breakfast bar/island, and more.

Penthouse residents often have fine views of the city skyline. Access to a penthouse apartment is usually provided by a separate elevator. Residents can also access a number of building services, such as pickup and delivery of everything from dry cleaning to dinner; reservations to restaurants and events made by building staffers; and other concierge services.

Penthouse apartments can also be situated on the corner of a building, providing 90° or more views of the surrounding skyline.

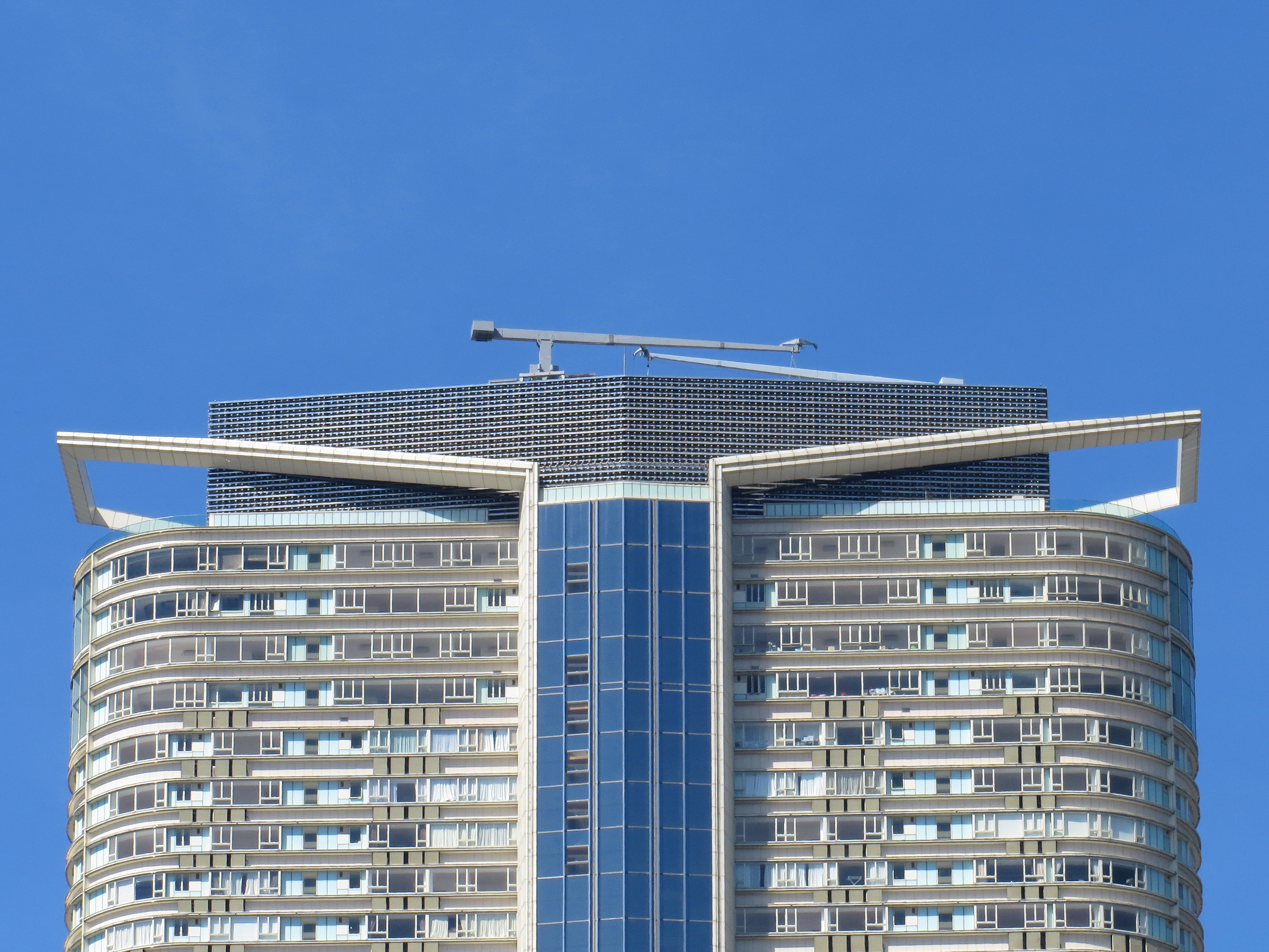
Penthouse apartments located on the top floors of The Masterpiece in Hong Kong.

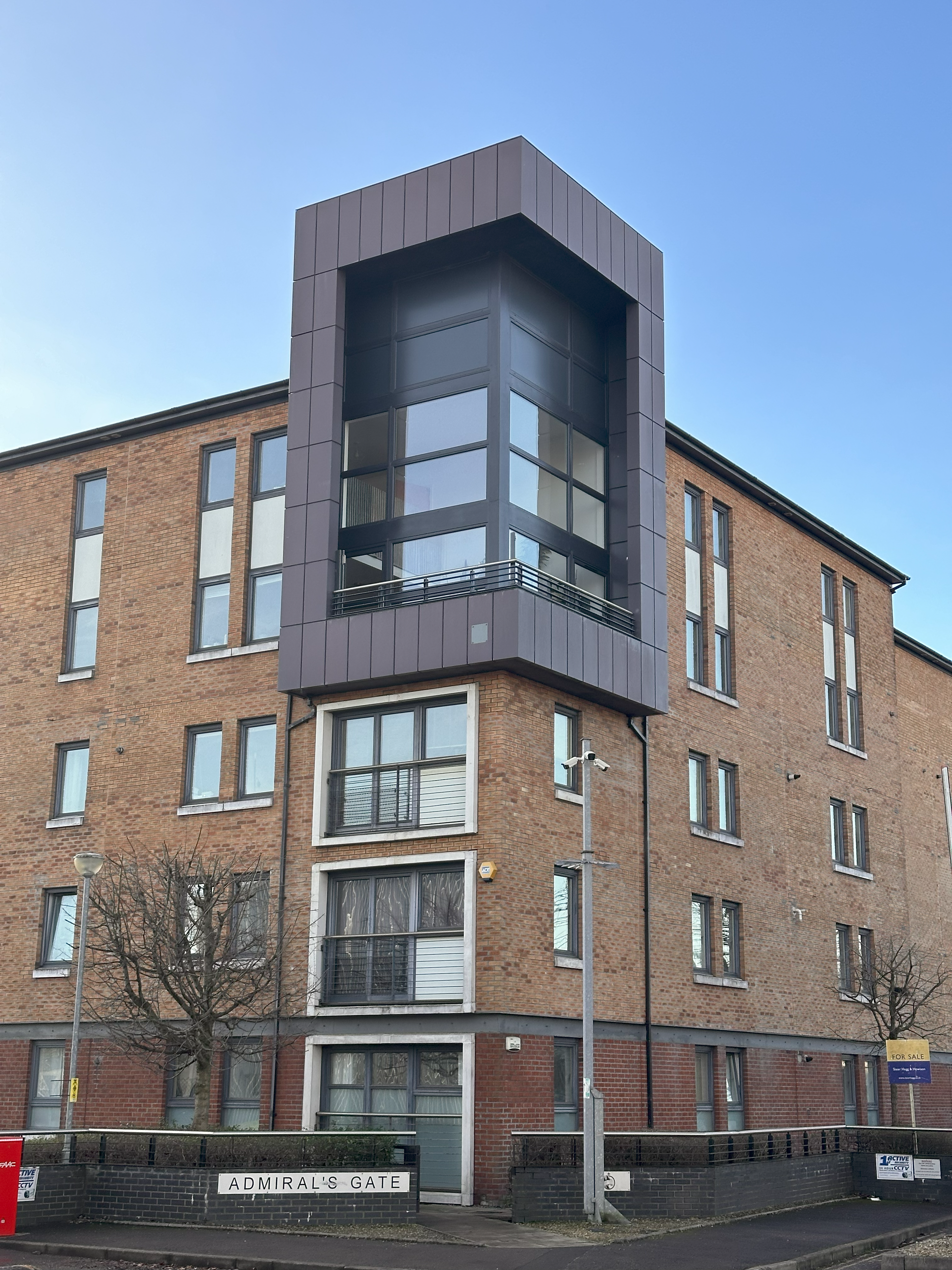
Penthouse on the corner of a building in Glasgow, United Kingdom.

== Cultural references ==
Penthouse apartments are considered to be at the top of their markets, and are generally the most expensive, with expansive views, large living spaces, and top-of-the-line amenities. Accordingly, they are often associated with a luxury lifestyle. Publisher Bob Guccione named his magazine Penthouse, with the trademark phrase "Life on top".

== See also ==
- Basement apartment
- Luxury apartment
- Roof garden
