= Renee Peck =

American writer (born 1953)

- Born: June Renee Brandt; December 22, 1953 (age 72); Houston, Texas, United States
- Education: Kenyon College
- Occupation: Writer
- Spouse(s): Stewart F. Peck, attorney
- Children: Megan Peck, Dartmouth 2006, Christina Peck, Vanderbilt 2007, Katherine Peck, Dartmouth 2012
- Writing career
- Notable work: This Mold House

Renee Peck (born June Renee Brandt) is an American writer, best known for her weekly column in The Times-Picayune titled "This Mold House." Peck spent three-plus decades working as a feature editor and reporter for The New Orleans Times-Picayune, covering everything from food to TV to home and garden.

== Early life ==
Peck was born on December 22, 1953, in Houston, Texas. At the age of 3, she moved to DeRidder, Louisiana, where her mother, June West Brandt, was from. Peck's family owned the national chain West Brothers, which was started by her grandfather W.D. West. Peck attended high school at The Hockaday School in Dallas, Texas, where she graduated in 1971. She graduated magna cum laude from Kenyon College with a degree in English literature in 1975, where she was a member of Phi Beta Kappa. While attending Kenyon, she worked for the Kenyon Collegian. She met her husband, Stewart F. Peck, an attorney at the Lugenbuhl, Wheaton, Peck, Rankin, & Hubbard law firm, while attending Kenyon.

== Early career ==
Upon graduation from Kenyon, Peck moved to New Orleans, La., where she took a job as a curatorial assistant for The Historic New Orleans Collection, a regional history museum and research archive on Royal Street in the French Quarter.

In 1977, she was hired as the food editor for The States-Item, the afternoon daily newspaper in New Orleans. When The States-Item merged with The Times-Picayune in 1980, she was retained as food editor of the new, larger paper.

In a 32-year career as a feature editor and writer at The Times-Picayune, Peck worked in a variety of capacities: as an associate features editor, TV Focus editor (the Sunday TV magazine), Lagniappe editor (the Friday entertainment tab), and InsideOut editor (the Saturday home and garden magazine). She focused on lively, topical subjects intended to explore the quirky lifestyles of New Orleans. She also began the paper's parenting page and Internet page and worked on a small team tasked to create its first website.

== This Mold House ==
During Hurricane Katrina's awful wake, Peck was part of the story she was suddenly covering.

"My first assignment was a re-entry story," Peck remembers. "What do you do when you're coming back after the flood? Do you need tetanus shots? Do you need hepatitis shots? What do you do if there are snakes in the water?"

Her answer was to chronicle her own rebuild (her house was destroyed by flooding when the levees breached after the hurricane, then was hit again by a freak tornado in February 2006) in a weekly column called This Mold House . She discussed her own problems and emotions during the rebuild in a deeply personal manner, discussing real issues but through the scope of humor in every situation. In doing so, she made her stories readable while relatable all the while.

National media outlets, including Newsweek, National Public Radio, and The New York Times, wrote articles on Peck and her now famous column. For example, Newsweek wrote a story on the writer in an article entitled A City Floods and Its Paper Sails. The article described Peck's record popularity, writing, "Today, [Peck's] section is fat with advertising, a rare example of robust growth in the otherwise moribund newspaper business." Newsweek recognized Peck's unique ability to employ humor in describing her efforts to rebuild. "It requires a certain sense of humor to keep living in the Big Easy," and through that humor, Peck was able to deeply connect with her readers. In noting this, the article wrote, "More remarkable still: people stop her, a newspaper editor, in public to tell her their stories. [Her weekly column] really struck a chord with them."

== Awards ==
Peck has received awards from the Associated Press and the New Orleans Press Club for service journalism. In 2010, she was granted the McCormick Foundation New Media Women Entrepreneurs award.

== NolaVie ==
Peck is currently the editor for NolaVie, a website featuring life and culture in New Orleans. NolaVie is populated by experienced journalists and members of various cultural organizations and is run by local businesswoman Sharon Litwin, as well as Renee Peck and a group of editors and writers.
