= Virginia Savage McAlester =

American architectural historian (1943–2020)

Virginia Savage McAlester (May 13, 1943 – April 9, 2020) was an American architectural historian.

== Research ==
McAlester is best known for her book A Field Guide to American Houses. She first published the book in 1984 with Lee McAlester, her second husband, and published an updated and revised version in 2013. The book proposes a detailed guide to architectural styles in housing across the United States. It uses both line drawings (of structures, façades and decorations) and photos and is credited with supporting preservation efforts in several American cities. A Field Guide to American Houses was listed as one of the ten most outstanding reference books of the American Library Association in 1984.

== Activism ==
McAlester helped found a non-profit aimed at historic architecture preservation, first named Historic Preservation League, then Preservation Dallas. This organization was instrumental in founding the first historic district of Dallas, Swiss Avenue, in 1973. She was also a strong advocate for the conservation of the buildings in Fair Park, site of the Texas Centennial Exposition of 1936.

== Personal life ==
McAlester was the mother of Amy Virginia Talkington. Her father was Wallace Savage, mayor of Dallas from 1949 to 1951. She died in Dallas on April 9, 2020, at the age of 76 from complications of a 2013 stem cell transplant to treat myelofibrosis.
