= Amanda Havard =

American novelist

- Born: June 10, 1986 (age 40); Shreveport, Louisiana, U.S.
- Education: Vanderbilt University (MEd)
- Occupations: Novelist; songwriter; interactive book developer
- Writing career
- Notable work: The Survivors series
- Notable awards: Independent Publisher Book Award 2011, Moonbeam Children’s Book Award
- Website: amandahavard.com

Amanda Havard (born June 10, 1986) is an American writer of young adult fiction, songwriter, Creative Director of the Immersedition transmedia studio, the creators of the Immersedition interactive book apps. Havard is most recognized for the paranormal romance series, The Survivors, a five-book series featuring history, mythology, and paranormal beings like witches, vampires, and shapeshifters.

== Early life ==
Amanda Havard was born in Shreveport, Louisiana to L.C. and Anneal Havard. She grew up in Dallas, TX and attended the Parish Episcopal School and the Hockaday School for girls. Upon graduation, Havard attended Vanderbilt University in Nashville, Tennessee where she received her bachelor's and master's degrees in early childhood development from Peabody College of Education and Human Development. Havard now lives in Nashville, Tennessee.

== Career ==
In 2014, Havard co-founded Health:ELT, a platform aimed at improving engagement and logistical support for Medicaid populations through digital tools like web dashboards and mobile apps.

She later founded Lunae Innovation Lab, a consultancy and venture studio focused on building scalable, human-centered digital products. Through Lunae, Havard has advised and supported several startups, including Wire Health and Zyme.

Havard was also the founding CEO of “Oria Health” but departed in 2023. It was a company focused on delivering accessible mental healthcare to rural and underserved populations. In 2023, Oria Health moved its headquarters to the Western Kentucky University Innovation Campus in Bowling Green, Kentucky.

== Advisory roles ==
Havard advises multiple early-stage startups, with a focus on digital health and technology. Her advisory roles include companies like Wire Health, Zyme, and ADoH Scientific.

== Personal life ==
Havard lives in Bowling Green, Kentucky.

== The Survivors series ==
=== The Survivors ===
The Survivors was published on March 28, 2011, by independent publisher Chafie Press. The Survivors is also the pilot version of the Immersedition book app. The Immersedition version includes original music (written by Havard), maps, photos, music videos, historical and mythological background information, author commentary, and other relevant additions to the story world. The Survivors was also released in syndication on Wattpad throughout 2011 and has received over 5 million reads.

The Survivors was a recipient of Independent Publisher's 2011 Editor's Choice Award, the 2011 Moonbeam Children's Book Award bronze medal for Young Adult Horror/Mystery, US Review of Books’ Eric Hoffer Lit Award 1st Runner-Up (YA), and eLit Awards' bronze medal in Young Adult and bronze medal in Fantasy/Sci-Fi.

=== Point of Origin ===
Point of Origin is the second book in The Survivors series and was published in 2012. It was awarded the Review Direct Title of Special Note.

=== Body & Blood ===
Body & Blood is the third book in The Survivors series.

== Creative director ==
In 2011, Havard was named Creative Director of Immersedition, an interactive book app.

=== Fiction ===
Havard's own work, The Survivors, was released on Immersedition. Havard has spoken on several media and transmedia panels across the country on the future of storytelling via multiple platforms and especially interactive books, including Digital Hollywood, Mediabistro's Pub App Expo, UtopYACon, and the New York Film Festival (2012). In April 2012, Wired (magazine) featured Havard and Immersedition™ among the independent publishers "leading the way" in the development of interactive books.

=== Education ===
Havard has worked on an educational Immersedition project using William Shakespeare's Romeo & Juliet, intended for classroom usage in schools.

== Songwriting ==
Havard has written and co-written songs that have been performed and produced to accompany The Survivors series. Havard used songwriting as a tool in the writing process to help articulate key scenes.

=== "Pretty Girl" ===
The first song written by Havard and Deanna Walker (songwriter and songwriting professor at Vanderbilt University) was "Pretty Girl" performed by The Voice Season 2 finalist, Chris Mann. "Pretty Girl" was released in April 2011 and was written from the perspective of the male lead, Everett Winter.

=== "Breaking" ===
The second single written for the series was co-written by Havard and Walker and titled "Breaking". "Breaking" was recorded by Jess Moskaluke. "Breaking" debuted on August 3, 2011, and has over 300,000 views on YouTube.

=== "Who You Are" ===
The third single written for The Survivors was co-written by Havard, Walker, Rick Beresford (BMI Award winner), and Tiffany Vartanyan. "Who You Are" is a duet performed by The Voice Season 1 contestant Patrick Thomas and Jenny Gill (daughter of Vince Gill). "Who You Are" was released on November 12, 2011.

=== "Play Nice" ===
The fourth single, recorded for Point of Origin, was written by Havard, Walker, and Beresford and is performed by singer/songwriter Elle Maze. "Play Nice" was released on November 12, 2012.
