= Renee Lynn Vicary =

American bodybuilder

Renée Lynn Vicary (June 12, 1957 – February 18, 2002) was an American competitive female bodybuilder from Erie, Pennsylvania.

== Contest history ==
- 1988 Powerhouse Natural Classic - 1st (HW & overall)
- 1990 NPC USA Championships - 14th (HW)
