= Roadburn Festival =

Dutch experimental music festival

Roadburn
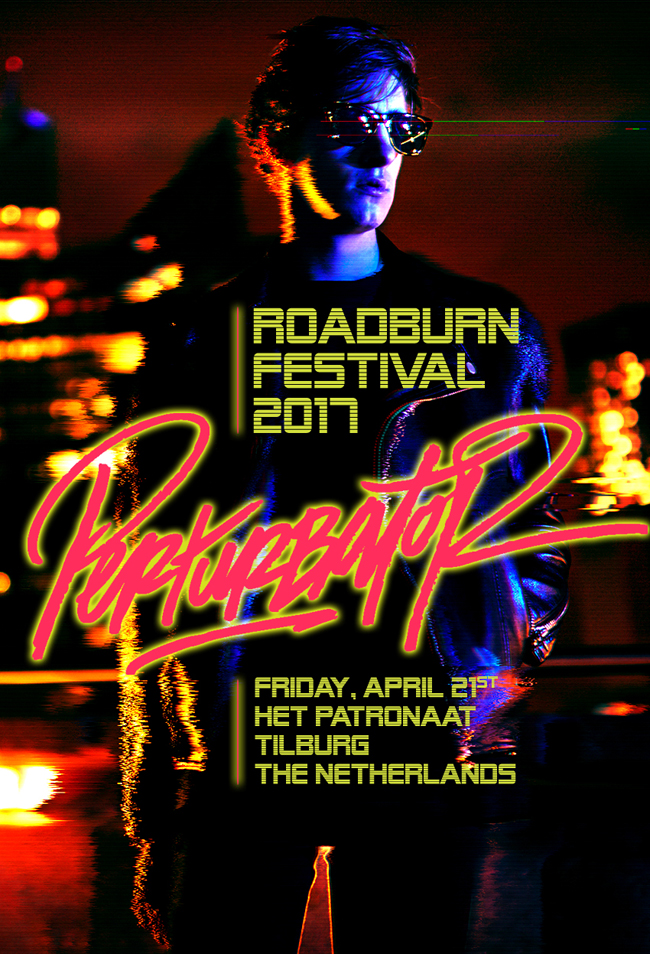
- Roadburn poster with Perturbator
- Genre: Extreme metal, experimental rock, post-rock, darkwave, doom metal, stoner rock (early)
- Dates: Mid-April
- Locations: Tilburg, Netherlands
- Coordinates: 51.5578°N 5.0928°E
- Years active: 1999–present
- Founders: Walter Hoeijmakers and Jurgen van de Brand
- Organiser: Walter Hoeijmakers
- Website: www.roadburn.com

The Roadburn Festival is an annual music festival held each April in Tilburg, Netherlands. It was founded by Walter Hoeijmakers and Jurgen van den Brand in 1999, who ran a stoner rock blog of the same name.

The festival has been held at Tilburg's 013 concert hall since 2005. In the earliest years before that, multiple events were organised in a year throughout various cities in the Netherlands, such as Nijmegen and Eindhoven. It evolved into a multi-day event beginning in 2006, and shortly after, tickets began to sell out for the festival in under an hour as its audience grew internationally. The festival estimates that around 75% of its attendees come from outside the Netherlands.

The festival has grown since its stoner rock origins and is now focused on various forms of experimental and extreme music: its motto in recent years has been "redefining heaviness."

Van den Brand, who runs affiliated record labels Burning World Records and Roadburn Records, parted ways with the festival in 2016. The current key staff involved with organising the festival are Hoeijmakers (artistic director), Becky Laverty (press and communication, booker), Mijndert Rodolf (business director), and Joel Heijda (booker).

== History ==
=== Early years (1999–2004) ===
The first edition of the festival was a series of three shows held from 11 to 13 February 1999, with performances in Amsterdam, Tilburg, and Sneek, respectively. Its line-up featured Cathedral, Orange Goblin, Beaver, Celestial Season, Terra Firma, and 35007.

In 2000, a one-day event was held on 24 November, as Spirit Caravan, Beaver, and 35007 performed in Nijmegen at the Doornroosje venue.

Three events occurred in 2001. Nebula, On Trial, and Rotor performed on 22 March in Nijmegen. Five Horse Johnson played in Den Bosch's W2 on 16 September (Leadfoot and Raging Slab were forced to cancel as all flights were shut down following the September 11 attacks). Lastly, Masters of Reality, supported by The Atomic Bitchwax and Terra Firma, played Tilburg's 013 on 4 December. The booking was made possible by founder Walter Hoeijmakers' relationship with Josh Homme, who had lived in Amsterdam for a brief period between the breakup of Kyuss and the start of Queens of the Stone Age. Homme and Nick Oliveri both performed with Masters of Reality in the final show of Roadburn 2001.

The Masters of Reality performance was broadcast live on 3voor12, which spread globally throughout the internet. Hoeijmakers, who is "still grateful to Homme for that," credits the show for being the moment when "people started to see Roadburn as a festival, while until then we were mainly a website about the thriving stoner, doom, and psychedelic rock scene."

No event took place in 2002. The eighth Roadburn occurred on 27 June 2003 in Eindhoven's Effenaar, headlined by Fu Manchu. Their performance would be released as a live album, Live at Roadburn 2003, in 2019. The 2004 edition, headlined by Monster Magnet, remained in Eindhoven on 17 June.

=== Move to Tilburg and popularity growth (2005–2015) ===
The tenth edition took place on 9 April 2005. The venue 013 invited the festival to come back to Tilburg, where it remains to this day. It was the first to feature multiple stages, and was headlined by Space Ritual and Electric Wizard; other bands included Sunn O))), High on Fire, and Brant Bjork and the Bros.

The 2006 edition, held on 21 and 22 April, was the first multi-day festival. It was headlined by a one-off Hawkwind performance. In 2007, Melvins and Blue Cheer headlined the first day on 20 April, and Neurosis headlined the second on 21 April.

The festival expanded to a four-day event, from Thursday to Sunday, in 2008. Down headlined the first day on 17 April, a celebration of Rise Above Records' 20th anniversary. Isis headlined Friday. Enslaved headlined Saturday, replacing Celtic Frost at the last minute, who cancelled because frontman Thomas Gabriel Fischer quit the band, leading to their eventual breakup. Sunday's lineup was headlined by Current 93 and curated by David Tibet.

The 2009 edition, from 23 to 26 April, sold out 45 minutes after tickets went on sale. It was headlined by Motorpsycho, the reunited Saint Vitus, Neurosis and Wino. Neurosis, curated Saturday's lineup, presented under the name "Beyond the Pale". It was the first to feature a second venue, V39.

The festival was held from 15 to 18 April in 2010. Tom G Warrior curated Friday's lineup, "Only Death is Real". The Icelandic volcanic eruptions shut down air travel throughout Europe, forcing bands such as Jesu and Candlemass to cancel.

In 2011, Swans (who had just recently reunited) was named as the headliner. Sunn O))) was the year's curator, and the festival featured special performances such as Candlemass performing Epicus Doomicus Metallicus, Godflesh performing Streetcleaner, and two unique Voivod sets. It was one of the first international performances for the anonymous Swedish band Ghost.

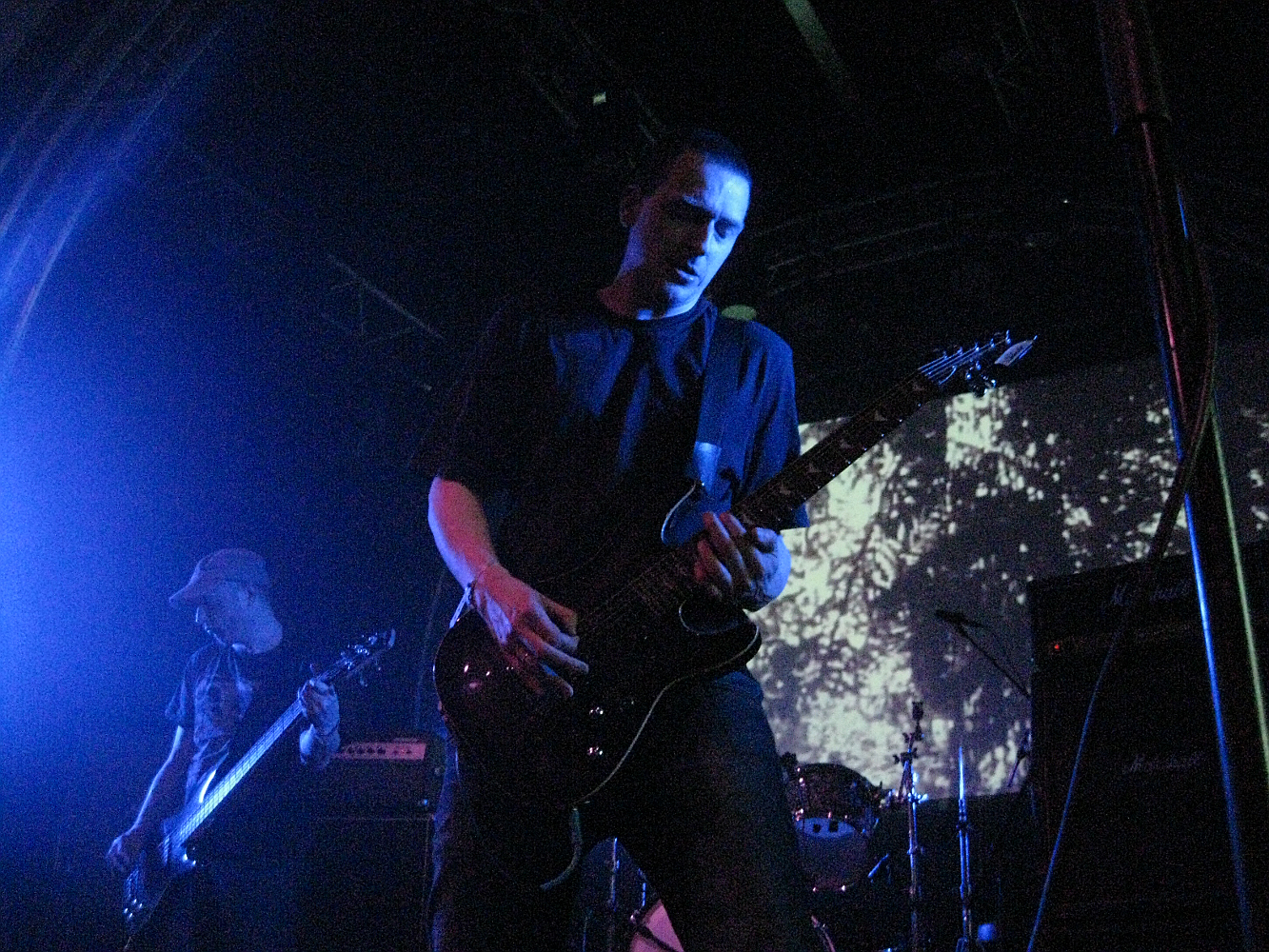
Jesu at Roadburn 2012

Sleep headlined Roadburn in 2012, which took place from 12 to 15 April. Voivod's "Au-delà du Réel" was the year's curator. The performers included Killing Joke, Chelsea Wolfe, Ulver covering '60s psychedelic rock and Yob doing two full album sets. The Midi Theatre, which had been added as a venue for the last two editions, closed on 1 January 2012 and was replaced by Het Patronaat.

The 2013 edition took place from 18 to 21 April. Electric Wizard headlined and vocalist Jus Oborn was the curator, presenting "The Electric Acid Orgy". Acts included Primordial, Psychic TV, The Ocean, The Ruins of Beverast, Asphyx and Michael Rother of Neu!, while special sets were Godflesh performing Pure, Alcest performing Les Voyages de l'âme, a collaboration between Emperor's Ihsahn and Leprous, High on Fire performing The Art of Self Defense, and two sets from reunited Die Kreuzen.

Roadburn announced the reunited Loop as the main headliner for 2014, and Mikael Åkerfeldt of Opeth as the year's guest curator. Comus, Crowbar, Napalm Death, Nothing, Magma, Triptykon and Circle were some of the performers.

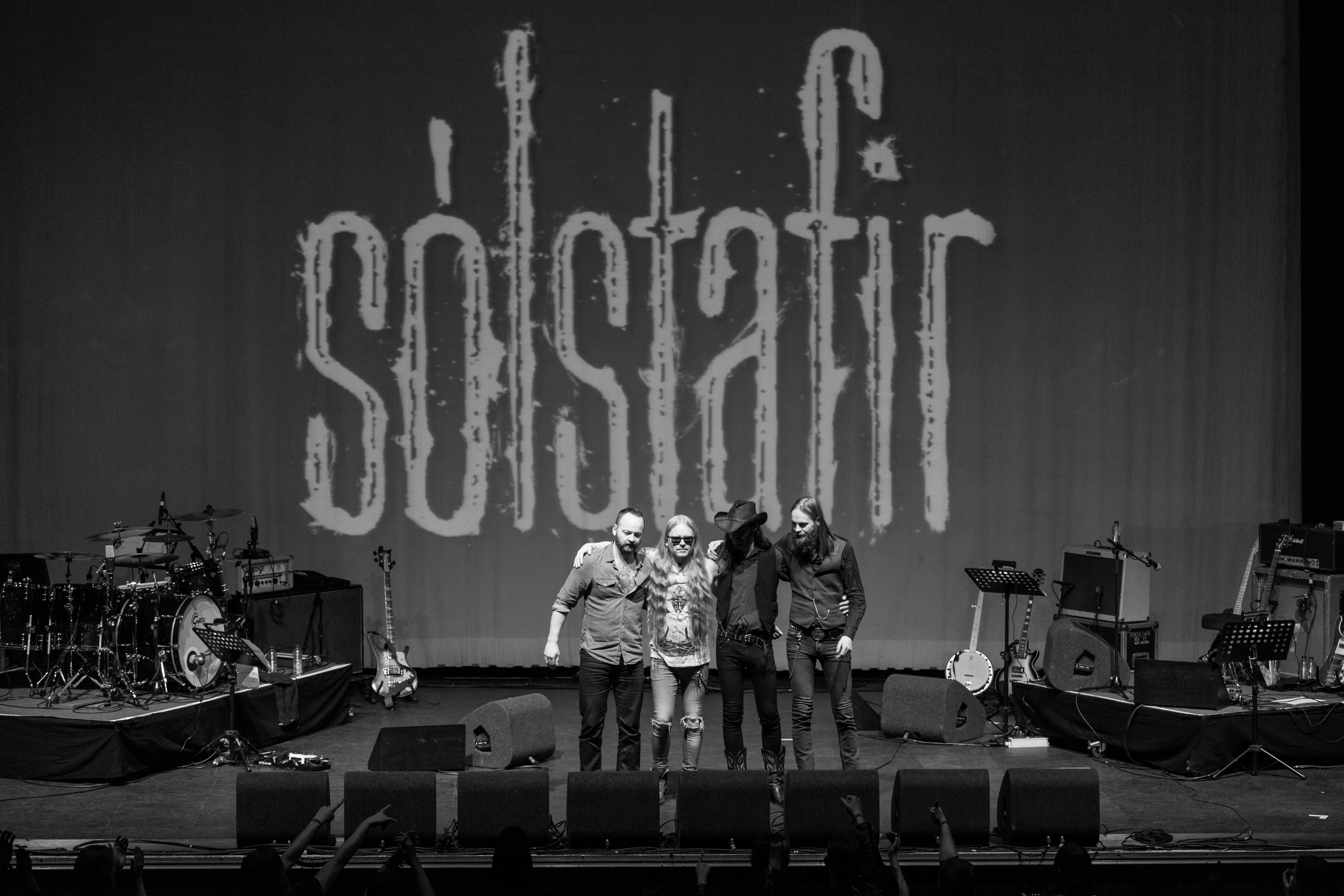
Sólstafir at Roadburn 2015

The twentieth edition of Roadburn took place from 9–12 April 2015. The artists on Friday 10 April were curated by Enslaved's Ivar Bjørnson and Einar Selvik as "Houses of the Holistic". It featured a collaboration between Enslaved and Wardruna, performing Skuggsjá, a piece written by Bjørnson and Selvik for the 200th anniversary of the Constitution of Norway. The Heads were the artist in residence. Fields of the Nephilim, Focus, Eyehategod, Sólstafir, Anathema, Russian Circles and Kayo Dot were among the other prominent performers.

=== Departure of van den Brand (2016–2019) ===
On 28 January 2016, co-founder Jurgen van den Brand announced that he would be parting ways with the festival to focus on his affiliated record labels such as Burning World Records and Roadburn Records.

The 2016 edition, from 14 April to 17 April, was headlined by Neurosis (celebrating the band's 30th anniversary) and Paradise Lost (performing Gothic in full). Lee Dorrian, of Cathedral and formerly Napalm Death, was the guest curator. Multiple special sets occurred: Converge performing Jane Doe for its 15th anniversary, Cult of Luna performing Somewhere Along the Highway for its 10th anniversary, a second Converge set entitled "Blood Moon" that saw the band perform with Chelsea Wolfe, Stephen Brodsky and Steve Von Till while experimenting with post-punk, alternative country and post-metal, and Diamanda Galás' "Death Will Come and Have Your Eyes" show.

Roadburn 2017 occurred on 20–23 April. The headliner was Baroness, and vocalist John Dyer Baizley was the curator, personally selecting Chelsea Wolfe, Oathbreaker, Amenra and Wear Your Wounds to perform on the same day as him. My Dying Bride performed Turn Loose the Swans, Ahab performed The Call of the Wretched Sea, Warning performed Watching From a Distance, and Bongzilla performed Gateway. The Bug collaborated with Dylan Carlson of Earth, while David Tibet and Youth of Killing Joke joined forces. Coven, Deafheaven and Dälek also played.

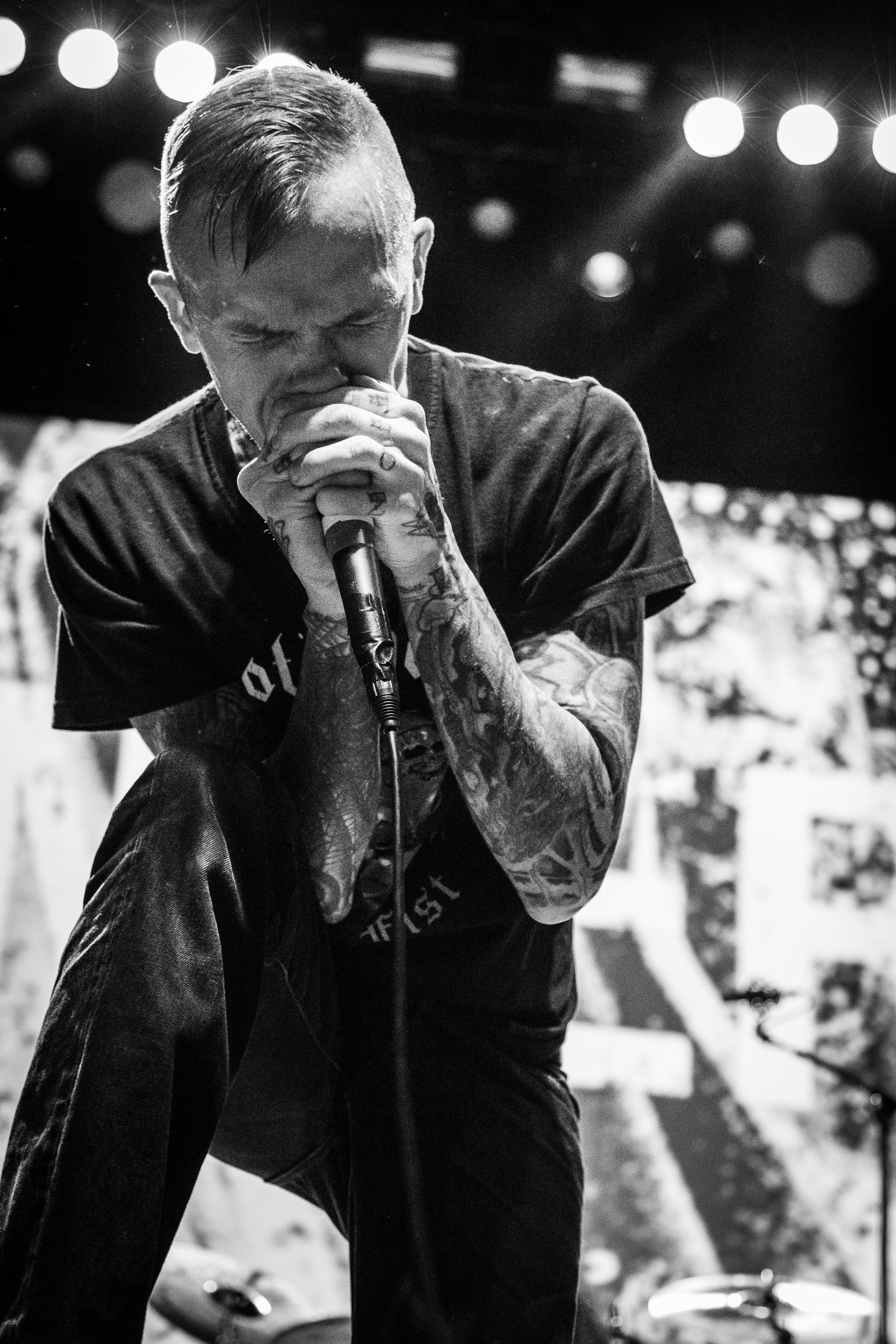
Converge at Roadburn 2018

The 2018 edition of Roadburn took place from 19 to 22 April. Jacob Bannon served as curator, and Converge played both You Fail Me and The Dusk in Us in full on separate nights. Godspeed You! Black Emperor played two sets. Cult of Luna and Julie Christmas performed the album Mariner, Bell Witch performed Mirror Reaper, Godflesh performed Selfless and Boris performed Absolutego with Stephen O'Malley. Collaborations included Thou x The Body and Justin Broadrick x The Bug (as Zonal) with Moor Mother. Earthless was the artist in residence and performed one set with Damo Suzuki. Other bands included Furia, Kairon; IRSE!, Kælan Mikla, Igorrr and Panopticon.

Sleep returned to headline the 2019 edition of Roadburn, from 11 to 14 April, playing Sleep's Holy Mountain and The Sciences. The band rejected a much more lucrative offer to play Coachella instead at the same week. At the Gates frontman Tomas Lindberg was the curator. Thou was the artist in residence, performing four sets, among them a collaboration with Emma Ruth Rundle and a set of Misfits covers at a skate park. Have a Nice Life performed Deathconsciousness and Triptykon played Celtic Frost's unreleased Requiem with the Metropole Orkest. Cave In returned to the stage after the death of bassist Caleb Scofield the year before. Holy Roar Records held a showcase. Drab Majesty, Daughters, Ulcerate, Anna von Hausswolff, Myrkur and Marissa Nadler were also on the lineup. The venue Het Patronaat closed immediately after Roadburn 2019; Imperial Triumphant was the last band to play there.

=== Pandemic hiatus and return (2020–present) ===
The 2020 lineup was curated by Emma Ruth Rundle and Perturbator, but was cancelled on 3 April because of the COVID-19 pandemic. In 2021, the festival did not happen and virtual performances were held.

Roadburn returned in 2022 from 21 to 24 April with a lineup curated by Milena Eva and Thomas Sciarone of the Dutch band GGGOLDDD. Special projects included Alcest performing Écailles de Lune in full, Liturgy performing H.A.Q.Q. and Origin of the Alimonies, Sólstafir performing Svartir Sandar, Full of Hell and Slift performing four sets as the artists in residence (including a Full of Hell x Nothing collaboration), and commissioned works from Cult of Luna guitarist Johannes Persson and Perturbator's James Kent.

The festival experienced difficulties in booking its lineup for 2023, leading to the lack of a curator. It took place from 20 to 23 April. Deafheaven played Sunbather (for its 10th anniversary) and Infinite Granite in full on separate nights. Giles Corey and Chat Pile made their European debuts. Wolves in the Throne Room revealed a special performance entitled "Shadow Moon Kingdom". Acts booked for 2020 finally played such as Julie Christmas, David Eugene Edwards, Brutus and Boy Harsher. Cave In, Backxwash and Elizabeth Colour Wheel performed multiple sets.

The 2024 edition featured headliners The Jesus and Mary Chain, Chelsea Wolfe, Khanate, Lankum, Clipping and Health. It was Khanate's first performance in 19 years, while Clipping played two sets. Blood Incantation played two sets, one focusing on their traditional death metal material while the other highlighted the band's electronic release Timewave Zero. Uboa performed three unique sets, including the live debut of The Origin of My Depression in full. Ragana and Drowse premiered a new collaborative piece titled "The Ash From Mount Saint Helens".

== Legacy and impact ==
The festival has been described as "prestigious" by numerous publications, including Revolver, Kerrang! and BrooklynVegan. Stereogum lauded Roadburn "as a vital annual landmark in the world of adventurous heavy music." Roadburn won the 2023 European Festival Awards honor for "Best Small Festival", a category for festivals with a capacity of under 10,000 people. Bandcamp praised how it "reliably coaxes landmark performances from the biggest and most intriguing names in extreme music, and regularly sells out in days, if not minutes." The Independent called it a "Mecca for those seduced by the experimental dark arts of psychedelia and doom, a celebration of the avant-garde artists determined to push the boundaries of heavy music in extremis."

Vice released a documentary in 2014 about co-founder Hoeijmakers titled Mr. Roadburn, featuring guest appearances from Roadburn musicians such as Aaron Turner, Scott Kelly and Mike Scheidt.

The festival attempted to reunite the American screamo band Orchid, offering the largest known reunion deal to them, but vocalist Jayson Green did not tell his bandmates about the requests.

The Luxembourgish newspaper Woxx noted that Roadburn featured "many more women on stage than at usual metal festivals", a platforming of queer issues, and a relatively high amount of non-Western performers. Hoeijmakers commented that "if you’re offering forward-thinking music and art, you attract forward-thinking people. We never set out to make Roadburn an overtly political festival, but of course it’s very obvious where Roadburn stands. We want to be inclusive, we want to be diverse."

== Collaborations and live albums ==
Artists often collaborate for exclusive Roadburn live performances, and some of these collaborative relationships are furthered in official studio recordings. Converge's 11th album Bloodmoon: I (2021), a collaboration with Chelsea Wolfe, arose from the band's "Blood Moon" performance at Roadburn in 2016. May Our Chambers Be Full (2020), a collaborative studio album by Emma Ruth Rundle and Thou, was the result of a live performance between Rundle and Thou at 2019's Roadburn, which was suggested by artistic director Hoeijmakers. Following Full of Hell and Nothing's "Full of Nothing" collaboration performance at Roadburn 2022, the bands released the material on the studio album When No Birds Sing in 2023. Drowse and Ragana collaborated at Roadburn 2024 with the piece "The Ash from Mount Saint Helens", which was turned into a studio album Ash Souvenir in 2025.

Several bands have also officially released "Live at Roadburn" performances as albums, including Wolves in the Throne Room, Ulver, Enslaved, Zola Jesus, Godflesh, Oranssi Pazuzu, Chelsea Wolfe, Emma Ruth Rundle, Chat Pile, Hell, and Fu Manchu. Converge's 2017 live album Jane Live features the band's full album performance of Jane Doe at Roadburn 2016.
