= Mariusz Lewandowski (artist) =

Polish painter, surrealist

- Lewandowski in his studio, 2020
- Born: July 31, 1960; Działdowo, Poland
- Died: July 16, 2022 (aged 61); Sołtysowizna, Górowo Iławeckie, Poland
- Known for: Album art
- Notable work: Essence of Freedom (Mirror Reaper)
- Style: Surrealism
- Website: lewandowski.art

Mariusz Eugeniusz Lewandowski (July 31, 1960 – July 16, 2022) was a Polish surrealist, fantastic art painter known for dream-like, looming oil paintings. Lewandowski gained popular recognition following his album art for the 2017 album Mirror Reaper by doom metal band Bell Witch, leading to further album art work in the extreme metal scene until his death.

== Life ==
Lewandowski was born in Działdowo, Poland on July 31, 1960. Although he showed interest in art from a young age, he did not receive formal art training; he first began oil painting at age 17. He ultimately began a career in agricultural mechanics, working as a metalworker in Warmia, where he continued painting in the context of work. He later moved to Górowo Iławeckie, where he would live the rest of his life.

== Art career ==
Essence of Freedom (2017), featured as the cover art of Mirror Reaper by Bell Witch. This work is held as Lewandowski's break into album art.

Lewandowski began working as a street artist later in life, selling his work throughout Masuria, particularly at Lidzbark Castle. In 2017, Lewandowski created the painting Essence of Freedom for the 2017 Bell Witch album Mirror Reaper via the band's label, Profound Lore Records. Following recognition for Mirror Reaper in the extreme metal scene, Lewandowski drew interest from other bands; he created works on request as well as selling & licensing paintings previous works. Labels he worked for included Sony Music Entertainment, Transcending Obscurity Records, and 20 Buck Spin. By his death in 2022, he had created the artwork for over 30 albums.

In 2021, Lewandowski had a run of five skateboard decks featuring his artwork, through a collaboration with Zero Skateboards.

== Death ==
Lewandowski died suddenly on July 16, 2022 in Sołtysowizna, Górowo Iławeckie, Poland, at age 61.

== Style ==
Many of Lewandowski's paintings featured a Grim Reaper-like figure, typically towering above the foreground. He frequently included tiny figures to establish enormous sense of scale. Lewandowski cited Polish surrealist Zdzisław Beksiński as a key inspiration.

== Works ==
=== Album covers ===
Album	Musical act	Album year	Name of artwork	Ref
Mirror Reaper	Bell Witch	2017	Essence of Freedom	(Note: Via lewandowski.art)
Bearer of Many Names	Eremit	2017		
The Course of Empire	Atlantean Kodex	2019	Army	(Note: Bellino 2019)
As the Kingdom Drowns	Psycroptic	2018	Before It's Too Late	
Entrance to the Otherwhere	Rogga Johansson	2019		
The Grand Descent	Fuming Mouth	2019	On the Other Side	
Cairn	Mizmor	2019	Immemortal Question	
Yodh: Live at Roadburn 2018	Mizmor	2019		
Walk Beyond the Dark	Abigail Williams	2019		
Stygian	Atramentus	2020	Act of Humility	
Acrimony	Trauma	2021	Saints and Demons	
Välde	Humanity's Last Breath	2021		
II	Intaglio	2021		
And Then There Were None	Livløs	2021		
...And I Return to Nothingness	Lorna Shore	2021		
Unorthodox	Doomocracy	2022	The Lower of Hope	

== Awards and recognitions ==
Award nominations
Year	Nominated work	Category	Award	Result	Notes	Ref.
2018	Essence of Freedom (Mirror Reaper by Bell Witch)	Best Album Artwork	Heavy Music Awards	Nominated		

== See also ==
- Chiaroscuro, the use of strong contrast in painting
