= New Introductory Lectures on the System of Transcendental Qabala =

Studio album by Kel Valhaal
- Released: July 15, 2016
- Recorded: 2014–2016
- Genres: Electronic; experimental
- Length: 34:11
- Label: YLYLCYN
- Producer: Haela Hunt-Hendrix

Singles from New Introductory Lectures on the System of Transcendental Qabala
- 1. "Tense Stage" Released: May 26, 2016; 2. "Ontological Love" Released: June 23, 2016

New Introductory Lectures on the System of Transcendental Qabala is the first studio album of Kel Valhaal, an electronic music focused project of Liturgy vocalist and guitarist Haela Hunt-Hendrix. It was released on Hunt-Hendrix's label YLYLCYN on July 15, 2016. Ideas for Kel Valhaal were created in 2010 as a rap project. However, Hunt-Hendrix's practice in making electronic music while touring with Liturgy led the project to be an electronic act, though her rapping is still present on the record in her trademark vocal style. Her intent of making music under the moniker Kel Valhaal is to create a complex spiritual mythology set to music; supposedly emulating what has been called "transcendental catharsis". The titular character of the project is described as a "logical agency of faith and acephalic becoming", with the name derived from Liturgy's third studio album The Ark Work.

== Background and composition ==
The press release for New Introductory Lectures on the System of Transcendental Qabala described the Kel Valhaal project as quieter, "less finely wrought" and containing "more frequent and shorter releases, more variation, less consistency" and "more experimentation" than the works of Liturgy. According to Hunt-Hendrix, the music of Kel Valhaal, an electronic music project originally formed in 2010 as a rap act, is intended to use sounds that emulate transcendental catharsis. It wasn't until the previous two years before the release of New Introductory Lectures that her skills in making electronic music improved, leading to Kel Valhaal to become an electronic act. The entire album was produced and mastered by Hunt-Hendrix with Ableton Live and a MIDI controller while touring with Liturgy.

Hunt-Hendrix said that the Kel Valhaal character, a protagonist in Hunt-Hendrix's script titled "01010n" that as of July 2016 is still in writing, is a hermaphroditic shaman that is a "logical agency of faith and acephalic becoming" in Liturgy's third studio album The Ark Work (2015). She also said that the project bites on "formal and cultural deadlocks" between styles of electronic music, rock, rap and classical music. The faith-based concept of the character is further emphasized by this collision between genres. As Hunt-Hendrix explained in an interview about the project's faith notion:

It's more specifically an attitude of astonishment. I like music and I like to make music that makes you feel a sense of awe and has a certain amount of discomfort in it. It's the awe of striving and becoming and confusion, as opposed to peace or enjoyment. I work to create that state in myself when I'm writing music.

New Introductory Lectures on the System of Transcendental Qabala fuses together elements of musical styles that range from Southern rap, industrial noise, acid house, new age and glitch music. Hunt-Hendrix categorized New Introductory Lectures on the System of Transcendental Qabala as a "system of philosophy that's unfolding as a website in connection with the album", the website being a six-chapter book. The chapters are blog posts or RSS feeds covering a topic from different viewpoints. The cover art for the record is a diagram of the fictional "Four Alimonies". 01010n is the top alimony of this illustration, where Hunt-Hendrix said that "music is good for accessing this level". It contains several ports that send rays into the land of ANANON, where aspects of nature such as human bodies, forms of art and work are created by an "immaterial, invisible idea" and spawned to YLYLCYN, which creates gates and assemblages. Finally, the valves in S/HE/IM, which shares the same placement and has some relations with 01010n, fix the problem where there is "something wrong, something missing, something that was not allowed to show itself".

== Tracks ==
Critic Joe Hemmerling wrote that some tracks on New Introductory Lectures "transpose metal’s labyrinthine structures into the sphere of electronic music". He used "Tense Stage" and "Ontological Love" as examples. The former song's foundation is a "sinuous interplay between its pounding bass beat and an urgent synth pattern". The track introduces several variations at an unsteady rate, resulting in the song being a "complex and unpredictable dance" track. As the song progresses, Hunt-Hendrix's voice is more incomprehensible as vocal track slicing and pitch-changing effects are used on it. The exact first half of "Ontological Love" is a "hypnotic instrumental", the rest of the track consisting of a rap verse from Hunt-Hendrix over "a swelling, swirling maelstrom of artificial strings". In the track, the rap consists of a "litany of jarring collisions between the sacred and the profane", lines including "I do cocaine with the clergy/ I teach peace to jihadis/ I show my tits to a leper." "Bezel II", which closes the album, uses an improvised chiptune lead melody and the same instrumental and rap elements as "Tense Stage" and "Ontological Love".

A majority of the other cuts on New Introductory Lectures are of short length, minimal and "more single-minded in their explorations" as Hemmerling described. "NMWE" only has multitracked vocal parts and a single improvised synthesizer riff in its instrumentation. "Bezel" features a "impressionistic", very distorted guitar line that Hemmerling compared to the beginning part of "High Gold", a track from Liturgy's second LP Aesthethica (2011). Hemmerling compared the latter half of "Kairos" to the works of John Carpenter. The album opener, "Mea Culpa", was described by Pitchfork writer Kevin Lozano as music that would be fit in an action scene of a science fiction horror Z movie.

== Release and reception ==
Professional ratings
Review scores
Source	Rating
Consequence of Sound	B
Pitchfork	3.5/10
Tiny Mix Tapes	3.5/5 stars

Two tracks from New Introductory Lectures on the System of Transcendental Qabala were released as singles before the album's release. "Tense Stage" was the lead single of the record, released on May 26, 2016. The track also had an official music video containing 3D visuals by AUJIK, which was honored by Fact magazine as one of the "best videos" for the week of June 19, 2016. The second single of New Introductory Lectures was "Ontological Love", premiered by Paper magazine on June 23. The album was released on Hunt-Hendrix's label YLYLCYN on July 15, 2016. Hemmerling, who graded New Introductory Lectures on the System of Transcendental Qabala a B, called the album a "brisk, exhilarating listening experience, and one that helps to clarify Liturgy’s divisive creative arc." He also wrote that "these peculiar compositions are able to take on a life of their own, and give hints of brilliance where once there appeared folly." Lozano was more negative towards the album, scoring it a 3.5 out of ten: "[She] is bold enough to say that [her] music, [her] career, will be a Wagnerian Gesamtkunstwerk, a total artwork so engrossing and multivalent that it speaks to all walks of life. And yet [her] music, time and again, is treated like an afterthought, just another piece of a larger and more pointless scheme of self-aggrandizement."

== Track listing ==
Length adapted from the following source:

No.	Title	Length
1.	"Mea Culpa"	1:14
2.	"Tense Stage"	7:53
3.	"NMWE"	1:47
4.	"Ontological Love"	10:14
5.	"Kairos"	4:35
6.	"Bezel I"	2:16
7.	"Bezel II"	6:12
Total length:		34:11

== Release history ==
Region	Date	Format(s)	Label
Worldwide	July 15, 2016	Digital download	YLYLCYN
