= Origin of the Alimonies =

Studio album by Liturgy
- Released: November 20, 2020
- Recorded: August 2019
- Studio: Machines With Magnets, Providence; Metropolis Mastering, Chicago
- Genre: Black metal; avant-garde metal; opera
- Length: 37:15
- Label: YLYLCYN
- Producer: Haela Hunt-Hendrix

Liturgy chronology
H.A.Q.Q. (2019)	Origin of the Alimonies (2020)	93696 (2023)

Professional ratings
Aggregate scores
Source	Rating
Metacritic	83/100
Review scores
Source	Rating
Clash	9/10
Exclaim!	7/10
Pitchfork	7.8/10

Origin of the Alimonies is the fifth studio album by American black metal band Liturgy. It was released on November 20, 2020, via bandleader Haela Hunt-Hendrix's record label, YLYLCYN.

== Performance ==
The album was performed by the band at the Roadburn Festival on 23 April 2022 in Tilburg. The band, consisting of guitarist Mario Miron, bassist Tia Vincent-Clark and Leo Didkovsky on drums alongside Hunt-Hendrix, was accompanied by a classical orchestra. For this occasion a concomitant film was made by Haela Hunt-Hendrix.

== Track listing ==
All tracks are written by Haela Hunt-Hendrix, unless otherwise noted.

No.	Title	Lyrics	Length
1.	"The Separation of HAQQ from HAEL"		4:31
2.	"OIOION's Birth"		1:47
3.	"Lonely OIOION"		4:40
4.	"The Fall of SIHEYMN"		4:47
5.	"SIHEYMN's Lament"		3:41
6.	"Apparition of the Eternal Church"	Hunt-Hendrix; Olivier Messiaen	14:02
7.	"The Armistice"		3:47
Total length:			37:15

== Personnel ==
Liturgy

- Haela Hunt-Hendrix – vocals, guitars, programming, composition, arrangement, lyrics, layout, production
- Bernard Gann – guitars
- Tia Vincent-Clark – bass guitar
- Leo Didkovsky – drums

Additional personnel

- Caleigh Drane – cello
- James Ilgenfritz – double bass
- Eve Essex – flute, saxophone
- Marilu Donovan – harp
- Eric Wubbels – piano, organ
- Nate Wooley – trumpet
- Carrie Frey – viola
- Josh Modney – violin
- Seth Manchester – recording, mixing
- AJ Tissian – engineering
