= Oranssi Pazuzu =

Finnish psychedelic black metal band

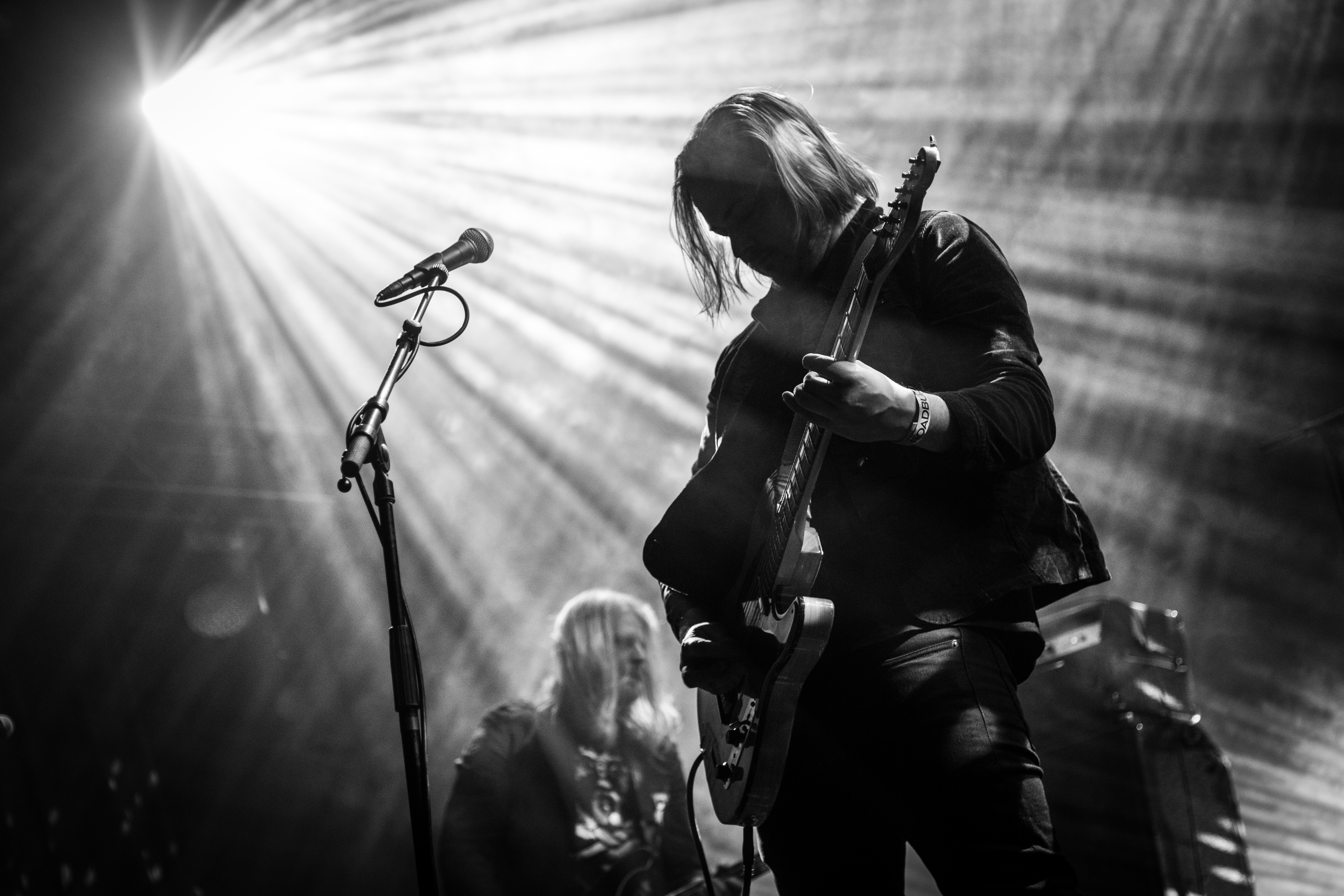
- Oranssi Pazuzu at Roadburn Festival 2017

Background information
- Origin: Tampere, Finland
- Genres: Psychedelic black metal, avant-garde metal, dark ambient
- Years active: 2007–present
- Labels: Violent Journey; Svart; 20 Buck Spin; Nuclear Blast
- Spinoffs: Atomikylä; Waste of Space Orchestra
- Members: Korjak; Ikon; Evil; Ontto; Jun-His
- Past members: Moit
- Website: www.oranssipazuzu.com

Oranssi Pazuzu is a Finnish psychedelic black metal band formed in 2007. The initial lineup consisted of vocalist and guitarist Juho "Jun-His" Vanhanen, drummer Jarkko "Korjak" Salo, guitarist Moit, keyboardist and percussionist Ville "Evil" Leppilahti, and bassist Toni "Ontto" Hietamäki. Moit left the band in 2016 and was replaced with Niko "Ikon" Lehdontie of Kairon; IRSE!.

The band takes its name from "oranssi", the Finnish word for the color orange, and Pazuzu, a wind demon from Babylonian mythology.

== History ==
The band recorded their debut album, Muukalainen puhuu, in 2008, in Salo's family cabin. Violent Journey Records released it in 2009, followed in 2010 by a split LP with Candy Cane. Spinefarm released their second full-length album, Kosmonument, in 2011. In 2013, Svart issued the follow-up, Valonielu, which London-based producer Jaime Gomez Arellano produced and engineered. The band's album Värähtelijä was released in 2016 and received positive reviews from music outlets such as AllMusic, Pitchfork and Spin. Lehdontie, of Finnish band Kairon; IRSE!, joined Oranssi Pazuzu in 2016, first as a live member, and later full time. In 2017, the band released the two-track EP Kevät / Värimyrsky. The band released their fifth album, Mestarin kynsi, in 2020.

Two members of Oranssi Pazuzu and two members of Dark Buddha Rising formed the band Atomikylä. Oranssi Pazuzu is part of the Wastement collective.

The band released their sixth studio album, Muuntautuja, in 2024. The album was well-received by critics, with many citing the record's unpredictability, originality, and darker sound as improvements over their 2020 effort.

== Musical style and legacy ==
The band's style is described as a fusion of elements of psychedelia, dark ambient and Krautrock. AllMusic's James Christopher Monger described the band's music as a combination of black metal, psychedelic rock, space rock, and progressive metal. The band are considered by some to be one of the greatest progressive black metal bands of all time. Jordan Blum of Loudwire said they were "among the most fascinatingly idiosyncratic and fearless groups" in the genre. Refused drummer David Sandstrom cited Oranssi Pazuzu as his favorite band.

== Members ==
=== Current ===
- Juho "Jun-His" Vanhanen – vocals, guitars (2007–present)
- Jarkko "Korjak" Salo – drums (2007–present)
- Toni "Ontto" Hietamäki – bass guitar, keyboards, vocals (2007–present)
- Ville "Evil" Leppilahti – keyboards, effects, percussion, vocals (2007–present)
- Niko "Ikon" Lehdontie – guitar, keyboards, electronics, samples (2016–present)

=== Former ===
- Timo "Moit" Alatalo – guitars, keyboards (2007–2016)

== Discography ==
Studio albums

- Muukalainen puhuu (2009)
- Kosmonument (2011)
- Valonielu (2013)
- Värähtelijä (2016)
- Mestarin kynsi (2020)
- Muuntautuja (2024)

EPs

- Kevät / Värimyrsky (2017)

Splits

- Candy Cane / Oranssi Pazuzu (2010)

Compilations

- "Tasapaino", included in Rabbit Ilsn Records Compilation Vol. 1 (2010)
- "Reikä Maisemassa", included in Space Rock: an Interstellar Traveler's Guide (2016)

Official Videos

- "Lahja" (2016)
- "Uusi Teknokratia" (2020)
- "Muuntautuja" (2024)
- "Valotus" (2024)
