= Helen LaKelly Hunt =

American activist and writer (born 1949)

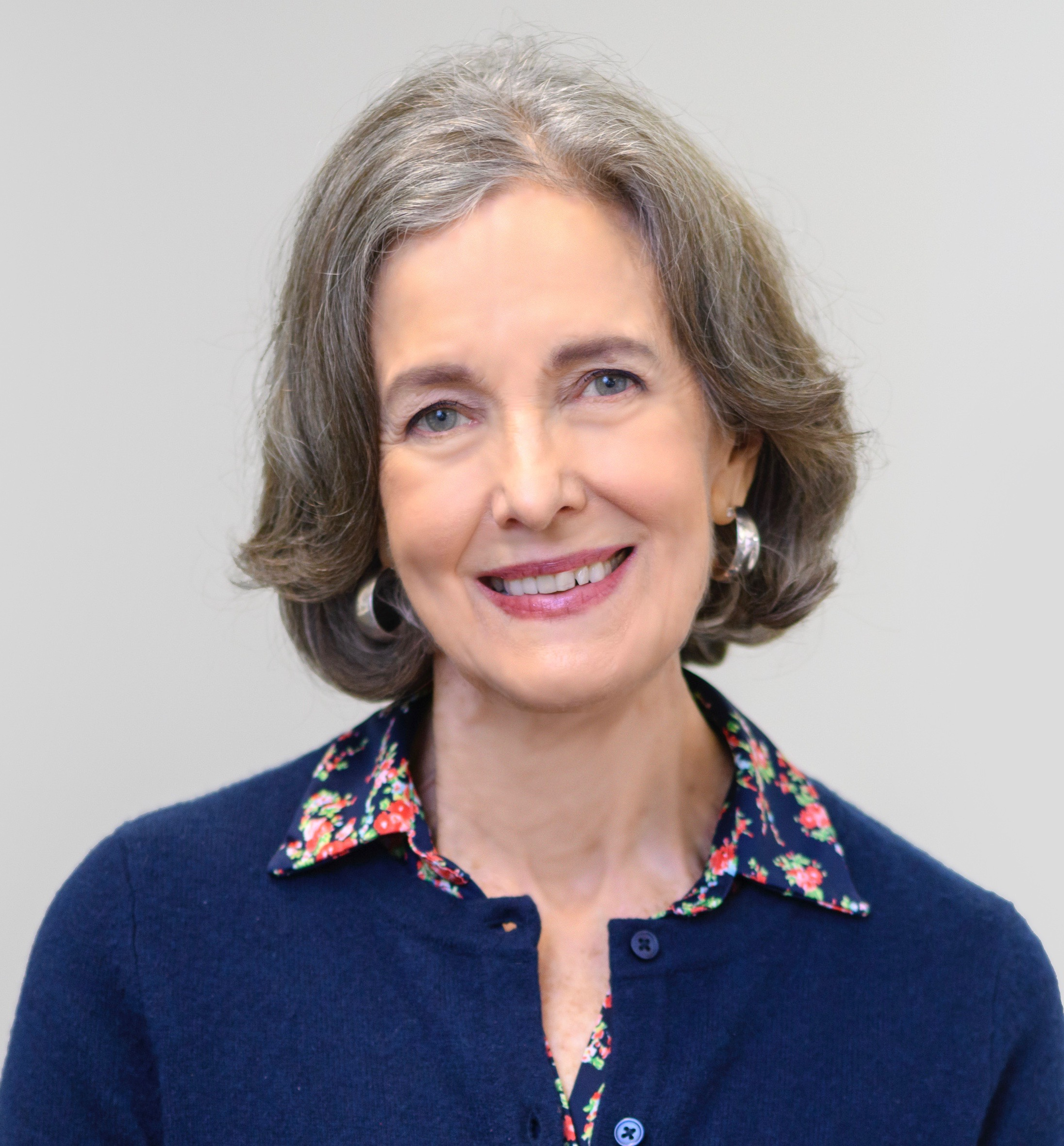
- Born: February 1949 (age 77)
- Occupations: Activist, feminist, philanthropist, writer
- Spouse: Harville Hendrix
- Children: 6, including Haela and Leah
- Parents: H. L. Hunt; Ruth Ray Hunt
- Relatives: Lamar Hunt (brother); Clark Hunt (nephew)

Helen LaKelly Hunt (born February 1949) is an American activist and writer. She is also a member of the wealthy Hunt family. She holds earned and honorary degrees from Union Theological Seminary and Southern Methodist University.

She earned a master's degree in clinical psychology and a Ph.D. in church history.

== Life and career ==
She is founder and president of The Sister Fund.

Hunt lives in Dallas, Texas, with her husband, Harville Hendrix.

Helen LaKelly Hunt along with her husband of more than 40 years, developed Imago Relationship Therapy. Together they have six children, including Haela Hunt-Hendrix, the vocalist of the black metal band Liturgy; Leah Hunt-Hendrix, an Occupy movement activist; and Kimberly June Miller, co-author of the book Boundaries for Your Soul.

She is a member of the Hunt oil/football family. Her brother Lamar founded the American Football League and the Kansas City Chiefs. Her nephew Clark, Lamar's son, became co-owner and chairman of the board for the Chiefs after Lamar's death.

In 2007 Helen and Swanee Hunt, with Chris Grumm, launched the Women Moving Millions campaign, with the goal of building a global collective of committed women making gifts of $1million or more for the advancement of women and girls.

From 2007 to 2018, Hunt owned a townhouse at 352 Riverside Drive in New York City.

== Bibliography ==
Hunt has written several books on feminism, including Faith and Feminism: A Holy Alliance and And The Spirit Moved Them: The Lost Radical History of America's First Feminists.

- LaKelly Hunt, Helen (2004). Faith and Feminism: A Holy Alliance. Atria. ISBN 0743483723.
- LaKelly Hunt, Helen (2017). And The Spirit Moved Them: The Lost Radical History of America's First Feminists. The Feminist Press at CUNY. ISBN 9781558614291.

She was also a contributor to the book Becoming Myself: Reflections on Growing Up Female.

- Shalit, Willa (2007). Becoming Myself: Reflections on Growing Up Female. Hachette Books. ISBN 978-1401308957.

Hunt has co-authored multiple books with her husband, including:

- Hendrix, Harville; LaKelly Hunt, Helen (1988). Getting the Love You Want: A Guide for Couples. St. Martin's Griffin. ISBN 9781250310538.
- Hendrix, Harville; LaKelly Hunt, Helen (1993). Keeping the Love You Find. Atria. ISBN 0671734202.
- Hendrix, Harville; LaKelly Hunt, Helen (1997). Giving the Love That Heals. Atria. ISBN 0671793993.
- Hendrix, Harville; LaKelly Hunt, Helen (2004). Receiving Love. Atria. ISBN 0743483707.
- Hendrix, Harville; LaKelly Hunt, Helen (2013). Making Marriage Simple: Ten Relationship-Saving Truths. Harmony Books. ISBN 9780770437145.
- Hendrix, Harville; LaKelly Hunt, Helen (2017). The Space Between: The Point of Connection. Franklin, TN: Clovercroft Publishing. ISBN 978-1945507366.
