= Leah Hunt-Hendrix =

American political activist

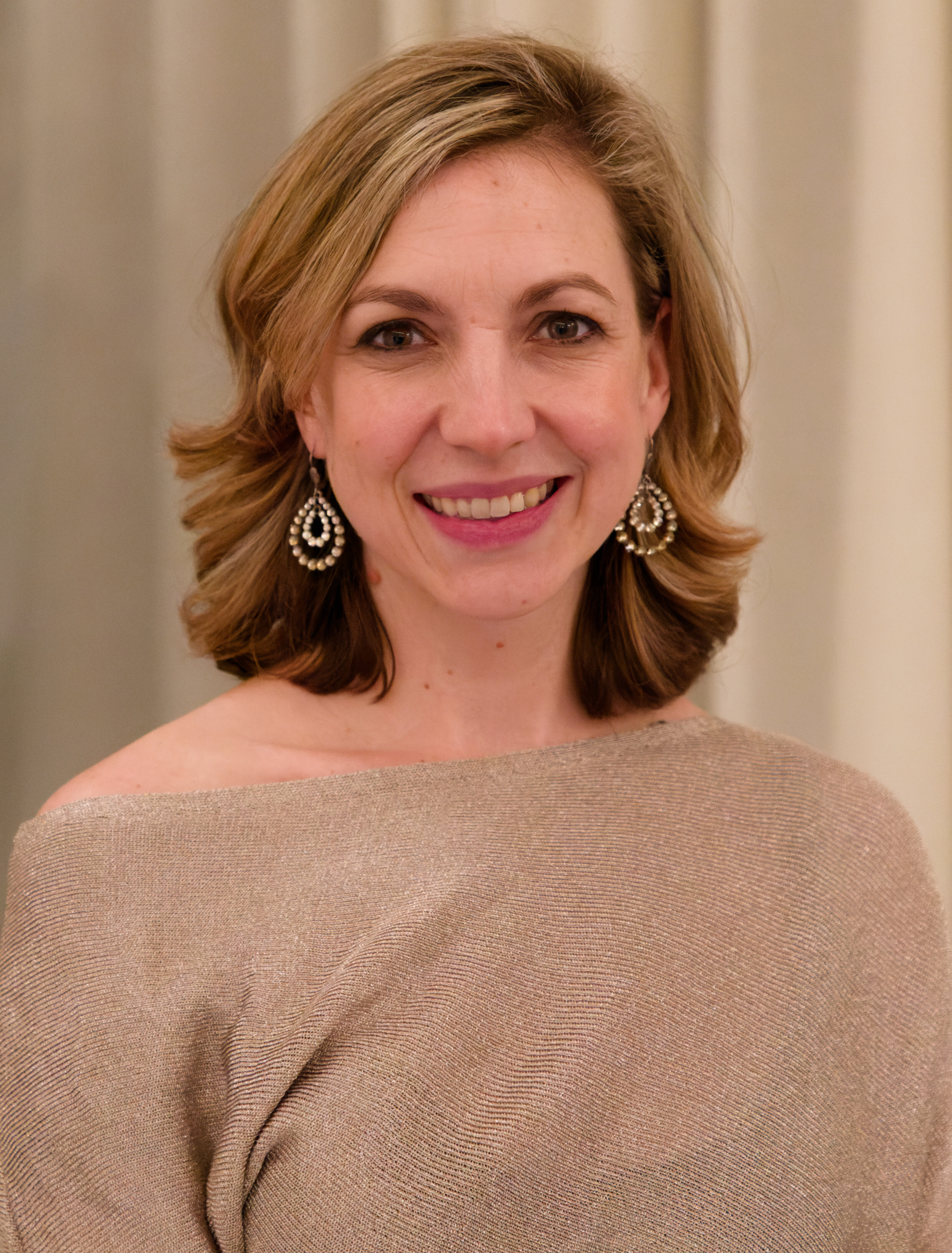
- Hunt-Hendrix in 2024
- Born: Leah Hunt-Hendrix
- Education: Duke University (BA); Princeton University (PhD)
- Occupations: Progressive activist Author
- Parent(s): Helen LaKelly Hunt (mother); Harville Hendrix (father)
- Relatives: H. L. Hunt (grandfather); Haela Hunt-Hendrix (sister); Lamar Hunt (uncle); Caroline Rose Hunt (aunt); Clark Hunt (cousin)

Leah Hunt-Hendrix is an American political activist and author. A member of the wealthy Hunt family, Hunt-Hendrix is the co-founder of progressive political organization Way to Win and philanthropy network Solidaire. She is on the board of directors of the Action Center on Race and the Economy, the Quincy Institute for Responsible Statecraft, and the Nation Fund for Independent Journalism.

Hunt-Hendrix is a senior advisor at the American Economic Liberties Project, and an advisor to her family foundation, the Sister Fund. She completed her undergraduate degree at Duke University and received a PhD from Princeton University.

== Early life and education ==
Leah Hunt-Hendrix was born and raised in New York City. Her parents are Helen LaKelly Hunt and Harville Hendrix.

Hunt-Hendrix is the granddaughter of prominent Texas oil tycoon H.L. Hunt. In 1964, The New York Times reported that he was "one of the richest men in the United States." Other notable members of her family include her sister Haela Hunt-Hendrix, her aunts former US ambassador to Austria Swanee Hunt and founder of Rosewood Hotels & Resorts Caroline Rose Hunt. She is the niece of American Football League (AFL) and Kansas City Chiefs founder Lamar Hunt. Her uncles also include Nelson Bunker Hunt and William Herbert Hunt, who gained notoriety in the late 1970s in an attempt to corner the silver market.

In 2005, Hunt-Hendrix earned a bachelor's degree in political science and governance from Duke University. At Princeton University, she completed a doctorate in religion, ethics, and politics in 2013. Her doctoral research focused on the concept of solidarity under the advisement of Jeffrey Stout, Eric Gregory, and Cornel West.

== Activism and journalism ==
In the early part of the 2010s, Hunt-Hendrix was a participant in the Occupy Wall Street movement. She has since founded three activist organizations: Solidaire, Way to Win, and the Emergent Fund.

In 2012, Hunt-Hendrix co-founded Solidaire, a network of rich individuals on the left wing committed to funding progressive social movements with a focus on racial and economic justice. She served for five years as the group's executive director.

Hunt-Hendrix co-founded Way to Win in 2017 with Victoria Gavito and Jenifer Ancona. The progressive political organization was established to support progressive candidates and movements. Way to Win has emphasized its strategy to flip elections in red states, particularly in the US South and Southwest, and to expand the base of Democratic voters. During the 2020 election cycle, Way to Win said it had deployed over $110 million in funding, with 85% directly supporting state programs.

Immediately after Donald Trump's election in 2016, Hunt-Hendrix co-founded the Emergent Fund, which said it was designed to move resources to communities that were deemed vulnerable to potential attacks from new federal policies and priorities.

Hunt-Hendrix is the co-author of the book Solidarity: The Past, Present, and the Future of a World Changing Idea, published in 2024 by Pantheon Books, with Astra Taylor.

== See also ==
- Democracy Alliance
- Institute for Policy Studies
- New Economy Coalition
