= AUJIK =

- Born: Stefan Larsson; 1973 (age 52–53); Sweden
- Website: www.aujik.com

AUJIK is an art concept initiated in 2001 by the award-winning (Prix Ars Electronica, Japan Media Arts Festival, Animago 2016, Screengrab) artist Stefan Larsson, who was born in Sweden and lives and works in Ōtsu, Japan.

AUJIK's multi-media works have been shown at the Prix Ars Electronica 2011, Onedotzero London at BFI Southbank 2011/2013/2016, SIGGRAPH Asia, CMoDA Beijing, Biwako Biennale 2012 & 2014, Japan Media Arts Festival 2010/2015. Nordic Outbreak by the Streaming Museum, NYC 2014, 'Death is your Body' Frankfurter Kunstverein 2014, Co-workers at the Museum of Modern Art, Paris 2016, Oberhausen Film Festival, Rotterdam Film Festival, Dokfest Kassel, Animago 2016, Screengrab Australia and events and exhibitions curated by Filmform, Onedotzero and Directors Lounge Berlin.

The group had solo exhibitions at galleries in Tokyo, Osaka, Kyoto and at CAC (Contemporary Art Center) in Vilnius.

== Notable work ==
- YUKI. 2007.
- A forest within a Forest. 2008.
- CATHEXIS. 2011. (Collaboration with christ.) Funded by the Swedish Arts Grants Committee and Ax:son Johnson's foundation.
- Impermanence Trajectory - the limbic nest. 2012.
- Impermanence Trajectory - stained seed. 2013. (Collaboration with Mira Calix and Oliver Coates)
- Plasticity Unfolding. 2014.
- Spatial Bodies. 2016 (Collaboration with Daisuke Tanabe)

== Commissioned work ==
- Chevron - Shimoda. (planet-MU) 2014.
- Liturgy - Quetzalcoatl. (Thrill Jockey records) 2014.
- Sun Araw - Gazebo Effect. 2015.
- Kel Valhall/Hunter Hunt Hendrix - Tense Stage. 2016.
- Guzz - Temple encounter. (Do Hits) 2016.
- Idris Makazu - Du Pèse. (Sing Sang) 2017.
- Empire Of The Sun (band) - Cherry Blossom. 2024 (EMI Australia)
