= I Found My Friends =

Book by Nick Soulsby

I Found My Friends: The Oral History of Nirvana
- Author: Nick Soulsby
- Language: English
- Genre: Biography
- Publisher: St. Martin's Press
- Publication date: March 31, 2015
- Publication place: United States
- Pages: 368
- ISBN: 978-1250061522

I Found My Friends: The Oral History of Nirvana is a book by author and writer Nick Soulsby·. It was published in March 2015 by St. Martin's Press. and documents the history of the band Nirvana through the opening performers and producers who played alongside on the stage with the band from 1987 to 1994. The book takes its title from the lyrics of the Nirvana song "Lithium".

Soulsby interviewed over 200 musicians from bands that played and toured with Nirvana, including well-known alternative bands such as Hole, Mudhoney, Meat Puppets, Buzzcocks, Butthole Surfers, and The Jesus Lizard, as well as countless others from the alternative rock scene.

The Library Journal's Chris Martin, in his review of the book, stated "this history is captivating enough to distinguish itself among the crowded canon. Hard-core and casual Nirvana fans alike will find this book engaging." Some reviewers though, such as Pitchforks’ Eric Thurm, were more negative, stating that the book is just "more myth making" and that "I Found My Friends is an enjoyable read for those friends/superfans interested in additional scraps of Nirvana trivia that have yet to be wrung for profit—but its unwillingness to do anything bold is its undoing."
