= Renihilation =

Studio album by Liturgy
- Released: May 8, 2009
- Genre: Black metal; avant-garde metal; drone
- Length: 38:39
- Label: 20 Buck Spin; Thrill Jockey
- Producer: Liturgy

Liturgy chronology
Immortal Life (2008)	Renihilation (2009)	Aesthethica (2011)

Renihilation is the debut album from Brooklyn, New York black metal band Liturgy. It was released on May 8, 2009, through 20 Buck Spin Records. It was reissued on the Thrill Jockey record label on August 26, 2014.

Professional ratings
Review scores
Source	Rating
About.com	1.5/5 stars
Allmusic	4/5 stars
The A.V. Club	A−
Pitchfork	7.8/10

== Track listing ==
No.	Title	Length
1.	Untitled	1:54
2.	"Pagan Dawn"	5:47
3.	"Mysterium"	4:43
4.	Untitled	0:57
5.	"Ecstatic Rite"	4:43
6.	"Arctica"	4:40
7.	Untitled	1:51
8.	"Beyond the Magic Forest"	3:24
9.	Untitled	2:18
10.	"Behind the Void"	4:18
11.	"Renihilation"	4:04
Total length:		38:39

== Personnel ==
- Tyler Dusenbury – bass guitar
- Greg Fox – drums
- Bernard Gann – guitars
- Haela Hunt-Hendrix – vocals, guitars, songwriter
- Recorded and mastered by Colin Marston
