= Four Phantoms =

Studio album by Bell Witch
- Released: April 28, 2015
- Studio: Audiosiege in Portland, Oregon
- Genre: Funeral doom
- Length: 66:27
- Label: Profound Lore Records
- Producer: Billy Anderson; Bell Witch

Bell Witch chronology
Longing (2012)	Four Phantoms (2015)	Mirror Reaper (2017)

Four Phantoms is the second studio album by Seattle-based doom metal band Bell Witch. It was released on April 28, 2015, through Profound Lore Records.

== Critical reception ==
Professional ratings
Review scores
Source	Rating
Chronicles of Chaos	8/10
Consequence of Sound	B+
Invisible Oranges	Positive
Pitchfork	8.2/10

Four Phantoms was met with positive reviews. Pitchfork writer Grayson Haver Currin said "Due in part to the band’s slim configuration, Four Phantoms feels sculpted, each part perfectly visible and framed." Writing for Consequence of Sound, Sean Barry said "Four Phantoms leaves a lasting impression down deep in your psyche. For those of us who have never experienced an encounter with the paranormal, this album has got to be the next best thing." Vanessa Salvia of Invisible Oranges wrote, "The songs get shorter as the album progresses, and though they don’t become more sonically dense, they do become more emotionally devastating." Chronicles of Chaos' Dan Lake wrote, "Bell Witch's second full-length improves on all the promising elements of their 2012 album, Longing. It's slow (check) and crushing (check), but it rises above the crowd of similar mourners by employing some extraordinary tear-wringing guitar leads and pairing simple, plaintive singing with those cavernous extreme vocals."

Four Phantoms also appeared on several year-end lists.

=== Accolades ===
Year	Publication	Country	Accolade	Rank
2015	Consequence of Sound	United States	"The Top 25 Metal Albums of 2015"	2
2015	LA Weekly	United States	"The 10 Best Heavy Metal Albums of 2015"	6
2015	Pitchfork	United States	"The Best Metal Albums of 2015"	3
2015	Spin	United States	"The 20 Best Metal Albums of 2015"	3

== Track listing ==
No.	Title	Length
1.	"Suffocation, A Burial: I – Awoken (Breathing Teeth)"	22:29
2.	"Judgement, In Fire: I – Garden (Of Blooming Ash)"	10:18
3.	"Suffocation, A Drowning: II – Somniloquy (The Distance of Forever)"	22:55
4.	"Judgement, In Air: II – Felled (In Howling Wind)"	10:45
Total length:		66:27

== Personnel ==
Credits adapted from liner notes.

Bell Witch

- Dylan Desmond – vocals, bass
- Adrian Guerra – percussion, vocals

Additional personnel

- Billy Anderson – production, engineering, mixing
- Brad Boatright – mastering
- Erik Moggridge – additional vocals (track 3)
- Justin Weis – mastering
- Paolo Girardi – artwork
