= H.A.Q.Q. =

Studio album by Liturgy
- Released: November 12, 2019
- Recorded: August 2019
- Studios: Machines With Magnets, Providence; Metropolis Mastering, Chicago
- Genres: Black metal; avant-garde metal
- Length: 45:11
- Label: YLYLCYN
- Producer: Haela Hunt-Hendrix

Liturgy chronology
The Ark Work (2015)	H.A.Q.Q. (2019)	Origin of the Alimonies (2020)

Singles from H.A.Q.Q.
- 1. "God of Love" Released: September 5, 2019

H.A.Q.Q. is the fourth studio album by the American black metal band Liturgy. It was released on November 12, 2019 as a surprise digital release, and physically in February 2020 through main artist Haela Hunt-Hendrix's label YLYLCYN. It was primarily recorded and produced in August 2019.

== Background and concept ==
The album title is an acronym for "Haelegen above Quality and Quantity". Haelegen is a function within Hunt-Hendrix's belief system, which she previously explored through the record New Introductory Lectures on the System of Transcendental Qabala (2016); this belief system is expressed as a diagram on the cover of the album.

The album is tied to an ongoing series of philosophical lectures by Hunt-Hendrix on YouTube, which details the system of concepts portrayed by the diagram on its cover.

== Critical reception ==
Professional ratings
Review scores
Source	Rating
Metal Storm	8.6/10
Pitchfork	7.6/10

Pitchfork gave the album a 7.6 out of 10, calling it "their most aggressive and radical album yet." H.A.Q.Q. was ranked #30 of 2019 by fans on Rate Your Music, and Kerrang! called it one of the ten best surprise-released rock albums of all time.

== Track listing ==
All tracks are written by Haela Hunt-Hendrix.

No.	Title	Length
1.	"Hajj"	8:30
2.	"Exaco I"	2:19
3.	"Virginity"	3:58
4.	"Pasaqalia"	5:18
5.	"Exaco II"	2:16
6.	"God of Love"	8:05
7.	"Exaco III"	4:00
8.	"Haqq"	7:03
9.	". . . ."	3:42
Total length:		45:11

Japanese bonus track
No.	Title	Length
10.	"Pasaqalia II"	3:06
Total length:		48:17

- All track titles are stylized in all uppercase.

== Personnel ==
Liturgy

- Haela Hunt-Hendrix – guitar, vocals, electronics, piano (track 5, 7, 9), bells (track 5, 6), production
- Bernard Gann – guitar
- Tia Vincent-Clark – bass
- Leo Didkovsky – drums, glockenspiel (track 4, 6)

Additional personnel

- Marilu Donovan – harp (track 1, 3, 6, 8)
- Lucie Vítková – hichiriki (track 1)
- Eric Wubbels – piano (track 2)
- Adam Robinson – ryuteki (track 1)
- Tadlow Ensemble – strings (track 4, 6)
- Cory Bracken – vibraphone (track 4, 6)
- Charlotte Mundy – voice (track 1, 3)
- Matt Colton – mastering
- Seth Manchester – mixing
