= Haela Hunt-Hendrix =

American musician (born 1985)

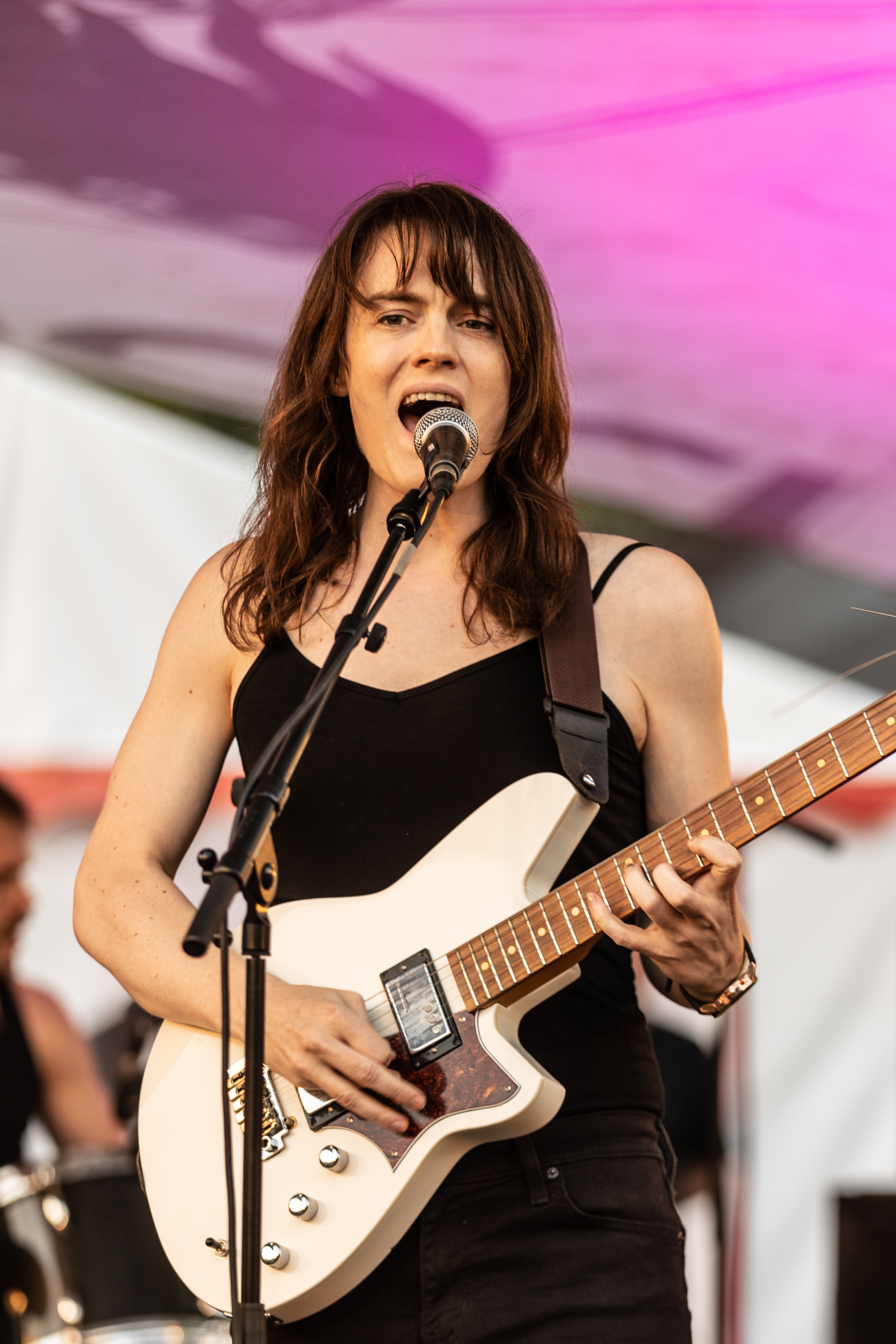
- Hunt-Hendrix at the Moers Festival 2022

Background information
- Born: January 25, 1985 (age 41); New York City, U.S.
- Genres: Black metal, avant-garde metal, experimental rock, classical music
- Occupations: Musician, composer
- Instruments: Guitar, vocals
- Member of: Liturgy
- Website: liturgy.bandcamp.com
- Relatives: Helen LaKelly Hunt (mother); Harville Hendrix (father); Leah Hunt-Hendrix (sister); H. L. Hunt (grandfather); Lamar Hunt (uncle); Clark Hunt (cousin)

Haela Ravenna Hunt-Hendrix; born January 25, 1985), also known as HHH, is an American musician and composer best known for her work as a creator, lead singer, and guitarist of experimental black metal band Liturgy.

== Personal life ==
Hunt-Hendrix was born in 1985 in New York City to academician Helen LaKelly Hunt and self-help author Harville Hendrix. Hunt-Hendrix is a member of the Hunt oil/football family which includes her billionaire grandfather oil tycoon H. L., her uncle Lamar, and her cousin Clark. She grew up in New Mexico, New Jersey, and Brooklyn, New York.

In May 2020, Hunt-Hendrix came out as transgender in an Instagram post saying, "The love I have to give is a woman's love, if only because it is mine. To varying degrees many already understand this, but I'd like to make a clear statement about my actual gender."

== Career ==
In 2005, Hunt-Hendrix formed Liturgy, her most well known music project as a solo project while attending Columbia University in New York City. In the same year her screamo side project Birthday Boyz released their debut album The Bro Cycle. Afterwards, Hunt-Hendrix collaborated with Krallice guitarist Collin Marston and former Birthday Boyz bandmates Greg Smith and Jeff Bobula to form the band Survival, who would later release their eponymous debut in 2013.

In 2008, Hunt-Hendrix released the EP Immortal Life under the Liturgy name and the band became a quartet with Bernard Gann (guitar), Greg Fox (drums), and Tyler Dusenbury (bass). Liturgy released their first full-length record, Renihilation, in 2009. Liturgy's second and third albums, Aesthethica (2011) and The Ark Work (2015) were released with Thrill Jockey Records. Despite the critical success of Aesthetica, Hunt-Hendrix said in an interview with Pitchfork that "I was never happy with any other Liturgy release. I didn’t want to release them. But the aim with this one (The Ark Work) was to take that musical vibe and execute it all the way—and I love it."

In 2016 Hunt-Hendrix released an electronic album titled New Introductory Lectures on the System of Transcendental Qabala with the band name Kel Valhaal. She says the release combines elements of classical music, electronic music, rap, and metal as well as works "to activate transcendental catharsis using the elements of sound design." In November 2019, Liturgy debuted their fourth studio album, H.A.Q.Q. featuring a new lineup with original members Hunt-Hendrix and Gann joined by Tia Vincent-Clark (bass) and Leo Didkovsky (drums).

On November 20, 2020, Liturgy released their fifth full-length studio album, said to be a "cosmogonical opera-album", Origin of the Alimonies. At the same time an accompanying operatic film written and starring Hunt-Hendrix was released; she also filmed and edited it. She debuted an earlier version of the video opera at National Sawdust in Brooklyn in October 2018. On March 24, 2023, Hunt-Hendrix as Liturgy released her sixth studio album, 93696.
