= Cobain on Cobain =

2016 book by Nicholas Soulsby

Cobain On Cobain: Interviews And Encounters
- Author: Nick Soulsby
- Language: English
- Genre: Biography
- Publisher: Chicago Review Press
- Publication date: February 1, 2016
- Publication place: United States
- Pages: 592
- ISBN: 978-1785580857

Cobain On Cobain: Interviews And Encounters is a book by author and writer Nick Soulsby. It was published in February 2016, and tells the tale of the band Nirvana entirely and only through the words of front-man Kurt Cobain and those of his band-mates through their five-year career. The interviews start from the release of their first album Bleach to the band's collapse on their 1994 European tour followed shortly by Cobain's suicide. The book also includes interviews that have never been seen in print before.

== Release ==
Upon release, Soulsby did some brief press for the book in the United Kingdom.

== Reception ==
Reception of the book was positive. Charles Cross, writing for The Seattle Times had said that "Cobain on Cobain is sure to interest die-hard fans.

Gillian Gaar, had also reviewed Cobain On Cobain and stated that "This fascinating collection offers you a front-row seat to Nirvana's stunning rise and tragic fall. Before the biographies, before the revisionism, before the mythologies, Nirvana's story is revealed by Cobain and his bandmates as it unfolds, without the benefit of hindsight. Cobain on Cobain is the closest you can get to a Kurt Cobain autobiography."
