= Gothic (Paradise Lost album) =

Studio album by Paradise Lost
- Released: 19 March 1991
- Recorded: November 1990 – January 1991
- Studios: Academy Music Studios, West Yorkshire, England
- Genres: Death-doom, gothic metal
- Length: 39:24
- Label: Peaceville

Paradise Lost chronology
Lost Paradise (1990)	Gothic (1991)	Shades of God (1992)

Gothic is the second studio album by British gothic metal band Paradise Lost, released on 19 March 1991 through Peaceville Records. The album (which was mostly described as death-doom when it was released) is retrospectively considered style-defining and name-giving for the genre of gothic metal.

The album has been re-released and remastered twice. The 2003 re-release contains two remixes of songs from Lost Paradise (1990), bringing the total running time to 49 minutes and 30 seconds. Remixed/live versions of the songs "Eternal", "Gothic" and "The Painless" appear on the 2003 digipak re-release of Lost Paradise. In 2008, Gothic was re-released with a bonus DVD with a rare performance by the band. The album was performed in full at the 2016 Roadburn Festival and released by the band on Bandcamp.

== Artwork ==
The album cover was vocalist Nick Holmes' idea, and is a close-up photograph of drummer Matt Archer's chest pocket with a segment of guitarist Gregor Mackintosh's arm showing. The close-up photograph originated from a band photo that was turned upside down. The band thought the section between Mackintosh and Archer "looked really weird", so the band decided to use it after cropping it out of the original and zooming in further.

== Reception and legacy ==
Professional ratings
Review scores
Source	Rating
Allmusic	3/5 stars
Rock Hard	8/10

AllMusic gave Gothic a three-star mixed review. In June 2005, Gothic was inducted into the Decibel Magazine Hall of Fame, becoming the fifth album overall to be featured there.

Chris Chantler of Metal Hammer wrote in 2020: "With their second album, the Halifax quintet began their extraordinary journey from scruffy tape-trade scenesters to planet-straddling rock gods. The self-explanatory Gothic raised the bar, introducing arty ‘80s goth influences to an insular underground, honing their songwriting, broadening horizons and nailing a wholly distinctive sound that they soon left behind."

== Track listing ==
All songs written by Nick Holmes and Gregor Mackintosh.

No.	Title	Length
1.	"Gothic"	4:51
2.	"Dead Emotion"	4:38
3.	"Shattered"	4:01
4.	"Rapture"	5:09
5.	"Eternal"	3:55
6.	"Falling Forever"	3:35
7.	"Angel Tears"	2:40
8.	"Silent"	4:42
9.	"The Painless"	4:02
10.	"Desolate"	1:51
Total length:		39:24

== Personnel ==
- Nick Holmes – vocals
- Matthew Archer – drums
- Stephen Edmondson – bass
- Aaron Aedy – guitars
- Gregor Mackintosh – guitars

=== Guest musicians ===
- The Raptured Symphony Orchestra – orchestral sections
- Sarah Marrion – vocals

=== Production ===
- Keith Appleton – engineering
- Richard Moran – cover art, photography
