= Nick Soulsby =

British writer

Nick Soulsby is a British writer, known for his books, curating and commentary about music and musicians, especially the alternative rock and post-punk era, including Nirvana, Kurt Cobain, and Thurston Moore.

== Books ==
Soulsby's earliest work, Dark Slivers: Seeing Nirvana In The Shards Of Incesticide (2012), was initially a concept prepared for an open competition for entries in the 33 1/3 book series, before being published on a friend's small imprint, then leading to the creation of his long-running Nirvana blog, Nirvana-Legacy.com. Ideas arising from the blog led to two volumes, I Found My Friends: The Oral History of Nirvana (2015) and Cobain on Cobain: Interviews & Encounters (2016). Soulsby has repeatedly credited the LiveNirvana fan site for showing him what motivated individuals can accomplish in terms of the surfacing, documenting and deeper celebration of the lives and work of an artist, and for inspiring him to start writing.

From there, Soulsby branched out to cover other key artists of the alternative rock and post-punk era. His next work, Thurston Moore: We Sing a New Language (2017) tackled the vast amount of work that Thurston Moore, best known for his multi-decade journey with Sonic Youth, had created outside that band. An oral history account of Michael Gira's veteran outfit SWANS followed — Swans: Sacrifice and Transcendence (2018) — achieving significant appreciation from fans and newcomers to the band. Gira interviewed extensively for the book and later commented to Decibel magazine that the oral history: "…Made me want to commit suicide. I’m not depicted as a saint in there, for sure. I was a tempestuous individual, and I don’t think I am as much anymore. It was disquieting some of the opinions of me. I have a lot of regrets. I do like Nick Soulsby, who compiled the book. I kind of wish he had written a book rather than just the oral history but I’m glad it’s there."

At the request of independent filmmaker Beth B and iconic underground star Lydia Lunch, Soulsby was brought on board to create an oral history volume to come out at the same time as Beth B's film Lydia Lunch: The War Is Never Over (2019). The book of the same name surveyed Lunch's career from her roots in the late 1970s NYC No Wave scene to the present day.

During the COVID-19 epidemic, Soulsby compiled rare and lost interviews with the band COIL from the years 1983 to 2004, resulting in the volume Everything Keeps Dissolving: Conversations With Coil (2023) with the esoteric publisher Strange Attractor Press. Rough Trade highlighted this book on their "Books of the Year 2023" list.

Born of Struggle, Living In Hope: The Anarcho-Punk Lives of the Centro Iberico — 1971-1983 (2026), came out with radical publisher PM Press detailing the life of an anarchist centre in London founded by an exiled veteran of the Spanish Civil War which went on to become a squatted music venue in an abandoned school.

Soulsby's most recent work is a substantial survey of the five decade-long output of anti-art/noise figureheads The New Blockaders, VIVA NEGATIVA! The New Blockaders: The Noise of Art and Nothing (2026) which was launched at the Vinyl on Demand Festival in Friedrichshafen, Germany in July 2026.

== Other media ==
Music curation: In 2014, Soulsby curated a double-LP compilation for Soul Jazz Records featuring lesser known artists from the late 80s-early 90s in the Pacific Northwest of America: No Seattle: Forgotten Sounds Of The North West Grunge Era.

Oral history: In 2015, Soulsby created an oral history of the band Fire Ants — featuring former Nirvana drummer Chad Channing — for a reissue of their 1992 EP Stripped. Soulsby then wrote an extensive oral history of the Scottish indiepop/noise/punk band Urusei Yatsura which was manufactured as a zine to accompany the reissue of their debut album We Are Urusei Yatsura (first issue, 1996, reissue 2023)

Chris Gollon: Soulsby features as an commentator in the documentary film Chris Gollon: Life In Paint (2024) commemorating the innovative modern painter Chris Gollon (1953–2017). Soulsby had interviewed Gollon for Thurston Moore: We Sing A New Language and became an admirer of his work, writing a piece for the catalogue accompanying a major retrospective of Gollon's work, Chris Gollon: Beyond The Horizon (October 2019-January 2020) at Huddersfield Art Gallery, to which he also loaned a piece in his possession, Last Radio (II) (After Bob Dylan.

Public speaking: Soulsby was invited to the 2016 SMILEfest Music Media Conference as part of a panel with Glenn Matlock (of the Sex Pistols), Rachel Aggs (from Shopping) and photographer Pennie Smith to discuss 'Punk Rock So What?' regarding the legacy of punk. He was a featured speaker at the Louder Than Words festival of music literature in 2016 and 2018 in relation to his Cobain On Cobain and Swans: Sacrifice And Transcendence books. At 2019's Pop-Kultur festival in Berlin, Soulsby hosted a workshop training attendees on how to use oral history in the documenting of music scenes and other subcultures. He also chaired a panel featuring Kristof Hahn and Paul Wallfisch (members of SWANS), and Marco Porsia, filmmaker responsible for the documentary Where Does A Body End?. He also interviewed with Porsia at the 2019 Doc 'n' Roll music film festival at London's Barbican venue and at the IndieLisboa film festival in Lisbon that same year. Soulsby also hosted an interview with Lydia Lunch at London's Barbican venue for Doc 'n' Roll in 2020.

Journalism: In 2015–2016, Soulsby wrote regularly for the Words & Guitars website, becoming a reviewer and journalist for PopMatters from 2020 onward (e.g. see Nicki Minaj, I'm Totally Fine with It Don't Give a Fuck Anymore, Harverd Dropout, 93696, Feel the Pain, Dry as a Bone). His writing has featured in Clash, Trebuchet, Revolver, The Quietus, Vinyl Factory, with a major multi-page feature on Centro Iberico appearing in The Wire magazine in 2023. He contributed to the 2023-2026 volumes of The Annual published by music label and avant-garde music press Korm Plastics writing on when 'noise' first became a genre title, the Monochrome Festival of Ugly Music in Bristol, the use of extreme imagery in the noise/power electronics genres, and the shift in experimental/industrial sound in the UK between 1982 and 1985. He also contributed forewords to Anthony Blokdijk's The Abrahadabra Letters (Korm Plastics, 2023) — a record of the pen-pal conversation between Blokdijk and John Balance in the 80s — and to Timeless Editions' 2026 art volume collecting Peter 'Sleazy' Christopherson's advertising campaign created for the Citizens Theatre, Glasgow in 1977–1978. Soulsby wrote further articles for The Art, Music and Writings Of Geoffrey Rushton Alias John Balance (Vinyl On Demand, 2024) — a comprehensive retrospective of the early works of Balance — and for De cœur à cœur: L'oeuvre de Marc Hurtado (Presses Du Reel, 2024) — a consideration of the film, visual, and musical works of artist Marc Hurtado.

== Publications ==
Books

- Dark Slivers: Seeing Nirvana In The Shards Of Incesticide (Running Water Press, 2012)
- I Found My Friends: The Oral History Of Nirvana (St Martin's Press, 2015)
- Cobain On Cobain: Interviews & Encounters (Chicago Review Press, 2016)
- Thurston Moore: We Sing A New Language (Omnibus Press, 2017)
- Swans: Sacrifice And Transcendence (Jawbone Press, 2018)
- Lydia Lunch: The War Is Never Over (Jawbone Press, 2019)
- Everything Keeps Dissolving: Conversations With Coil (Strange Attractor Press, 2023) (a RoughTrade “Book of the Year” 2023) (9)
- Born Of Struggle, Living In Hope: The Anarcho-Punk Lives Of The Centro Iberico, 1971-1983 (PM Press, 2026)
- VIVA NEGATIVA! The New Blockaders: The Noise Of Art And Nothing (PC Press, 2026)
