= Imago therapy =

Therapy practice concerning relationships

Imago Relationship Therapy (IRT) is a form of therapy that focuses on relationship counseling.

== Background ==
IRT emphasizes structured communication through the Imago Dialogue, designed to reduce reactivity, foster empathy, and transform conflict into opportunity for relational growth-focusing on "the space between" partners rather than diagnosing one partner. Empirical studies show that IRT exercises improve accurate empathy development and communication skills in couples.

== History ==
IRT was developed by Harville Hendrix and Helen LaKelly Hunt. The word imago is Latin for "image"; in this sense, it refers to the "unconscious image of similar love", according to one therapist.

A 2017 study of the method's effectiveness found that couples participating in IRT increased marital satisfaction during treatment (and to a lesser extent at a follow-up) but that the improvements were not clinically significant.

Research published in 2025 in the Journal of Couple & Relationship Therapy found that the workshops yielded short-term improvements in relationship satisfaction and communication.
