= Harville Hendrix =

American writer

- Born: 1935 (age 90–91); Statesboro, Georgia, U.S.
- Occupation: Writer
- Spouse: Helen LaKelly Hunt
- Children: 6, including Haela and Leah

Harville Hendrix (born 1935) is an American writer.

Hendrix is best known for the book Getting the Love You Want, which gained popularity during Hendrix's 17 appearances on The Oprah Winfrey Show.

He is a member of the American Association of Pastoral Counselors as well as a clinical member of the American Group Psychotherapy Association and the International Transactional Analysis Association, and has produced 10 written works in partnership with his wife Helen LaKelly Hunt.

== Career ==
Hendrix was born in 1935 in Statesboro, Georgia. At the age of 17 he became an ordained Baptist minister, after which he continued on to receive his B.A. at Mercer University in Georgia, in 1957, and his B.D. from Union Theological Seminary in 1961. Following this, Hendrix then went on to receive both an M.A. and Ph.D. in psychology and religion from the Divinity School at the University of Chicago.

Hendrix, along with his wife Helen LaKelly Hunt, developed Imago Relationship Therapy, a form of relationship and couples therapy.

=== Getting the Love You Want ===
Getting the Love You Want: A Guide for Couples is a relationship self-help book by Harville Hendrix and Helen LaKelly Hunt, first published in 1988 by Henry Holt.

The book is linked with the Getting the Love You Want weekend workshop, first offered by Hendrix in 1979 as an experimental retreat for couples. Early workshops emphasized expressive group work influenced by Transactional Analysis and Gestalt therapy, but over time shifted toward structured dialogue and relational safety. By the late 1980s, the central technique of Imago Dialogue (mirroring, validation, empathy) had become core to both the workshops and the book.

Later adaptations consolidated the workshop around four practices of "relational competency": Dialogue, Zero Negativity, Empathy, and Affirmation. Public visibility of both the book and the workshops increased following Hendrix’s appearances on The Oprah Winfrey Show.

== Bibliography ==
- Hendrix, Harville; LaKelly Hunt, Helen (1988). Getting the Love You Want: A Guide for Couples. St. Martin's Griffin. ISBN 9781250310538.
- Hendrix, Harville; LaKelly Hunt, Helen (1993). Keeping the Love You Find. Atria. ISBN 0671734202.
- Hendrix, Harville; LaKelly Hunt, Helen (1994). Couples Companion: Meditations & Exercises for Getting the Love You Want: A Workbook for Couples. Atria. ISBN 0671868837.
- Hendrix, Harville; LaKelly Hunt, Helen (1995). The Personal Companion : Meditations and Exercises for Keeping the Love you Find. Atria. ISBN 0641919999.
- Hendrix, Harville; LaKelly Hunt, Helen (1997). Giving the Love That Heals. Atria. ISBN 0671793993.
- Hendrix, Harville; LaKelly Hunt, Helen (1999). The Parenting Companion: Meditations and Exercises for Giving the Love That Heals. Atria. ISBN 0671868853.
- Hendrix, Harville; LaKelly Hunt, Helen (2003). Getting the Love You Want Workbook: The New Couples' Study Guide. Atria. ISBN 0743483677.
- Hendrix, Harville; LaKelly Hunt, Helen (2004). Receiving Love. Atria. ISBN 0743483707.
- Hendrix, Harville; LaKelly Hunt, Helen (2013). Making Marriage Simple: Ten Relationship-Saving Truths. Harmony Books. ISBN 9780770437145.
- Hendrix, Harville; LaKelly Hunt, Helen (2017). The Space Between : The Point of Connection. Franklin, TN: Clovercroft Publishing. ISBN 978-1945507366.
- Hendrix, Harville; Hunt, Helen (2021). Doing imago relationship therapy in the space-between : a clinician's guide. National Geographic Books. ISBN 978-0-393-71381-7. OCLC 1191456118.
