= Longing (Bell Witch album) =

Studio album by Bell Witch
- Released: November 13, 2012
- Recorded: May 2012
- Studio: Soundhouse and Airport Grocery Studios in Seattle, Washington
- Genre: Doom metal; funeral doom
- Length: 67:33
- Label: Profound Lore Records
- Producer: Bell Witch

Bell Witch chronology
Demo 2011 (2011)	Longing (2012)	Four Phantoms (2015)

Longing is the debut studio album by the Seattle-based doom metal band Bell Witch, released on November 13, 2012 through Profound Lore Records. The album began Bell Witch's trend of slow, low, and mournful music for which the band would become known.

== Critical reception ==
Professional ratings
Review scores
Source	Rating
MetalSucks	3.5/5 stars
Pitchfork	8.0
PopMatters	7/10 stars

Longing was met with generally positive reviews. Andy O'Connor of Pitchfork magazine praised the album's haunting, melancholic nature, and highlighted the vocals as particularly effective in evoking a bleak atmosphere. Writing for PopMatters, Craig Hayes said, "Longing highlights just how far we can sink into mires of hopelessness, and the bittersweet beauty we find in such despair. Bell Witch strikes a superb balance between the vulnerability of painful remembrances and stentorian roars of sorrow." Metal Injection's Cody Davis wrote, "Desmond and Guerra exchange vocals that mix between ghostly bellows and Gregorian-esque clean vocals throughout Longing in addition to bringing utterly leveling bass guitar and drums that flip the script on what qualifies to make heavy Doom Metal." In MetalSucks' more lukewarm review of Longing, the album was lauded for its mood and slow pace, but was also recognized as difficult to approach and deliberately hard to listen to.

== Music ==
The fourth track, "Beneath the Mask", features a section of dialogue from the film The Masque of the Red Death.

== Track listing ==
No.	Title	Length
1.	"Bails (of Flesh)"	20:41
2.	"Rows (of Endless Waves)"	13:02
3.	"Longing (The River of Ash)"	12:05
4.	"Beneath the Mask"	5:54
5.	"I Wait"	12:24
6.	"Outro"	3:27
Total length:		67:33

== Personnel ==
Credits adapted from Longing's liner notes.

Bell Witch

- Dylan Desmond – bass, vocals
- Adrian Guerra – drums, vocals

Additional personnel

- Erik Moggridge – guest vocals (2)
- Chris Hanzsek – mastering
- Brandon Fitzsimons – recording
