= The Ark Work =

Studio album by Liturgy
- Released: March 24, 2015
- Genre: Experimental rock; avant-garde metal; black metal; art rock
- Length: 56:14
- Label: Thrill Jockey

Liturgy chronology
Aesthethica (2011)	The Ark Work (2015)	H.A.Q.Q. (2019)

Singles from The Ark Work
- 1. "Quetzalcoatl" Released: January 20, 2015; 2. "Reign Array" Released: March 6, 2015

The Ark Work is the third studio album by American black metal band Liturgy. It was released on March 24, 2015, through Thrill Jockey record label.

The first single off the album, "Quetzalcoatl" was released digitally on January 20, 2015.

== Background ==
Following the release of the band's second album, Aesthethica, Liturgy toured as a duo, only featuring the band leader Haela Hunt-Hendrix and guitarist Bernard Gann. During this period, Hunt-Hendrix planned the album by herself for a couple of years and expressed a desire to move away from its standard “transcendental black metal” style, to incorporate more “electronic elements.”

In 2014, the former band members, bassist Tyler Dusenbury and drummer Greg Fox, rejoined the band to record the upcoming third studio album. The Ark Work was announced on January 20, 2015, and the press release of the album describes it as featuring "cross-fertilizing hardstyle beats, occult-oriented rap, and the glitched re-sampling of IDM."

== Reception ==
Professional ratings
Aggregate scores
Source	Rating
Metacritic	63/100
Review scores
Source	Rating
AllMusic	2.5/5 stars
The A.V. Club	B+
Consequence of Sound	B−
Exclaim!	3/10
Metal Storm	2.0/10
The New York Times	(favorable)
Pitchfork Media	6.4/10
PopMatters	8/10
Uncut	3/5 stars
Spin	8/10

The album received polarised receptions from critics and fans alike. Consequence of Sound gave the album a B− and said it was "triumphant and interesting enough to keep fans satisfied", though also noted the album will raise "the question the band has prompted before: Is this even black metal?" The A.V. Club, which awarded the album a B+, called the album "more progressive and polarizing than ever" and "a singular musical achievement". The New York Times suggested that the album found the band truly developing its own sound and, while not free of criticisms, observed, "The band knows its virtues and works them hard". NPR stated that with this album, Hunt-Hendrix "[has] come closer than ever to realizing" her goal of creating transcendental black metal. PopMatters shared this opinion; while they criticised the album's lyrics, they effusively praised other aspects of the album, saying, "it manages to capture Hunt-Hendrix’s aesthetic vision without feeling like it’s reaching to tack on a philosophy to its adventurous music. The record truly feels like Transcendental Black Metal". Pitchfork Media gave it a mixed review, rating the album at 6.4 out of 10 and praising Greg Fox' performance and the first five songs but criticising Hunt-Hendrix' vocals as monotonous and the album as overlong. Exclaim! shared this reaction, opening their 3/10 review with "Guys, Liturgy is fully trolling us." The album currently has a score of 63 on Metacritic, indicating "generally favorable reviews".

== Track listing ==
No.	Title	Length
1.	"Fanfare"	2:21
2.	"Follow"	3:31
3.	"Kel Valhaal"	7:11
4.	"Follow II"	7:30
5.	"Quetzalcoatl"	4:48
6.	"Father Vorizen"	5:58
7.	"Haelegen"	2:54
8.	"Reign Array"	11:35
9.	"Vitriol"	5:21
10.	"Total War"	5:06
Total length:		56:14

== Personnel ==
=== Liturgy ===
- Haela Hunt-Hendrix – vocals, guitar, electronics
- Bernard Gann – guitar
- Tyler Dusenbury – bass guitar
- Greg Fox – drums, percussion

=== Other musicians ===
- Daniel Blacksberg – trombone
- Josh Millrod – trumpet
- Caley Monahon-Ward – violin
- Andrew Forbes – bagpipes

=== Other personnel ===
- Frank Musarra – producer, engineer
- Jonathan Schenke – engineer, mixing
- Jason Ward – mastering
- Jacqueline Castel – photography
- Navi – photography
- Zev Deans – image development
- Kayla Guthrie – text
