= Sołtysowizna =

- Village
- Location within Poland
- Coordinates: 54°17′45″N 20°30′25″E
- Country: Poland
- Voivodeship: Warmian-Masurian
- County: Bartoszyce
- Gmina: Górowo Iławeckie
- Population: 660

Sołtysowizna [sɔu̯tɨsɔˈvizna] is a village in the administrative district of Gmina Górowo Iławeckie, within Bartoszyce County, Warmian-Masurian Voivodeship, in northern Poland, close to the border with the Kaliningrad Oblast of Russia.
