= Bell Witch (band) =

American doom metal band

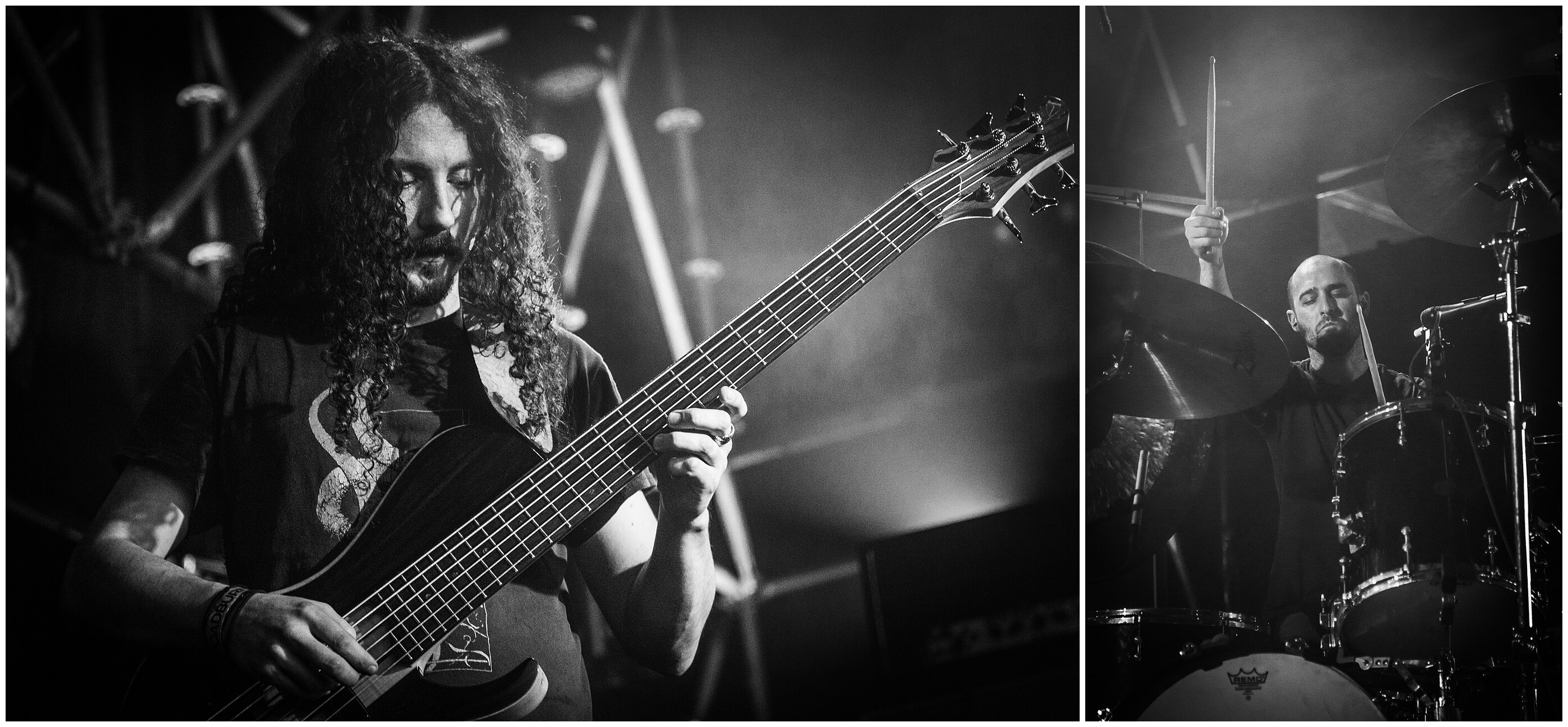
- Dylan Desmond (left) and Jesse Shreibman (right) performing at Roadburn Festival 2018

Background information
- Origin: Seattle, Washington, U.S.
- Genres: Drone metal; doom metal; funeral doom; sludge metal; post-metal
- Years active: 2010–present
- Label: Profound Lore
- Members: Dylan Desmond; Jesse Shreibman
- Past members: Adrian Guerra
- Website: https://www.bellwitchdoom.net/

Bell Witch is an American doom metal band from Seattle, Washington, formed in 2010.

== History ==
Bell Witch was formed in 2010 by Dylan Desmond and Adrian Guerra. The group has no lead guitarist. In 2011, the group created a four-track demo that was released through a number of small record labels. With the success of that release, Bell Witch went on to create their first two studio albums, Longing (2012) and Four Phantoms (2015). In 2016, drummer and co-founding member Adrian Guerra died, shortly after being replaced by Jesse Shreibman on drums.

Less than a year later, Bell Witch released their third album, Mirror Reaper (2017), to critical acclaim. The album features vocals from Guerra that had been left over from the Four Phantoms sessions and acts as a tribute to him. Notably, Mirror Reaper comprises one 84-minute song of the same name. Mirror Reaper received significant national coverage, appearing on a number of year-end lists.

After performing vocals in the second half of Mirror Reaper, Erik Moggridge of Aerial Ruin collaborated with Bell Witch on their fourth album, Stygian Bough Volume 1 (2020).

On April 18 2023, the band announced that their new album Future's Shadow Part 1: The Clandestine Gate, part of a trilogy, would be released the next Friday (April 21). On the day of release, they played the entire album at Roadburn Festival.

== Members ==
Current members

- Dylan Desmond – vocals, bass (2010–present)
- Jesse Shreibman – drums, keyboards, vocals (2015–present)

Former members

- Adrian Guerra – drums, vocals (2010–2015; died 2016)

== Discography ==
Studio albums

- Longing (Profound Lore Records, 2012)
- Four Phantoms (Profound Lore Records, 2015)
- Mirror Reaper (Profound Lore Records, 2017)
- Stygian Bough Volume 1 (with Aerial Ruin; Profound Lore Records, 2020)
- Future's Shadow Part 1: The Clandestine Gate (Profound Lore Records, 2023)
- Stygian Bough Volume 2 (with Aerial Ruin; Profound Lore Records, 2025)

Other releases

- Demo 2011 (various labels, 2011)
- Live at Roadburn 2015 (Roadburn Records, 2018)
