= 93696 =

Studio album by Liturgy
- Released: March 24, 2023
- Recorded: Late 2020
- Genre: Experimental black metal, symphonic black metal
- Length: 82:09
- Language: English
- Label: Thrill Jockey
- Producer: Steve Albini

Liturgy chronology
As the Blood of God Bursts the Veins of Time (2022)	93696 (2023)

93696 is a 2023 studio album by American black metal band Liturgy. The album has received positive reviews from critics.

== Reception ==
Professional ratings
Aggregate scores
Source	Rating
Metacritic	79 (8 reviews)
Review scores
Source	Rating
AllMusic	4.5/5 stars
Exclaim!	8/10
Pitchfork	8.0/10
PopMatters	9/10

93696 received positive reviews from critics noted at review aggregator Metacritic. It has a weighted average score of 79 out of 100, based on eight reviews. Editors at AllMusic rated this album 4.5 out of 5 stars, with critic Thom Jurek writing that this album "offer[s] an exhilarating, sometimes overwhelming journey across extreme music's terrain". In Exclaim!, Kyle Kohner gave this release an 8 out of 10, calling it "an ethos" and "full of unpronounceable spirit that makes Liturgy a unique and constantly innovative band". Pitchfork's Sam Goldner gave this album an 8.0 out of 10, summing up that Liturgy is "in full command of its sound, weaving between passages of chaotic release and delicate beauty, it sounds as if Liturgy have finally found some kind of promised land". PopMatters' Nick Soulsby scored 93696 a 9 out of 10 for having "perfectly poised elements in some delicately balanced scheme" and representing "a new pinnacle regarding [songwriter] Hunt-Hendrix's ability to create songs that are utterly pulverizing because of their relentlessness and compositional complexity".

Editors at Pitchfork included this in their list of the 37 best rock albums of 2023. At Bandcamp, this album was chosen as one of the essential releases in their best albums of 2023 list. Editors at AllMusic included this on their list of favorite metal albums of 2023. Editors at BrooklynVegan included this on their list of the 55 best albums of 2023.

== Track listing ==
All tracks are written by Haela Hunt-Hendrix.

No.	Title	Length
1.	"Daily Bread"	2:18
2.	"Djennaration"	8:20
3.	"Caela"	4:54
4.	"Angel of Sovereignty"	2:06
5.	"Haelegen II"	9:00
6.	"Before I Knew the Truth"	4:26
7.	"Angel of Hierarchy"	3:13
8.	"Red Crown II"	1:49
9.	"Angel of Emancipation"	2:48
10.	"Ananon"	5:09
11.	"93696"	14:51
12.	"Haelegen II" (reprise)	1:36
13.	"Angel of Individuation"	5:45
14.	"Antigone II"	14:08
15.	"Immortal Life II"	1:41
Total length:		82:09

== Personnel ==
Liturgy

- Leo Didkovsky – drums
- Haela Hunt-Hendrix – guitar; keyboards; vocals; arrangement; piano on "Djennaration", "Haelegen II", "Before I Knew the Truth", "Ananon", and "Immortal Life II"; Rhodes piano on "Angel of Emancipation", "Ananon", and "Angel of Individuation"; 12 string guitar on "Haelegen II" and "93696"; Wurlitzer electric piano on "Red Crown II"; Marxophone on "Angel of Individuation"; toy piano on "Angel of Hierarchy"; programming on "Djennaration"
- Mario Miron – guitar, acoustic guitar on "Haelegen II" and "93696"
- Tia Vincent-Clark – bass guitar

Additional personnel

- Steve Albini – recording, production
- Cory Bracken – glockenspiel on "Djennaration", "Before I Knew the Truth", "Angel of Hierarchy", "Ananon", and "Angel of Individuation"; vibraphone on "Djennaration", "Before I Knew the Truth", "Angel of Hierarchy", "Ananon", and "Angel of Individuation"
- Jon-Paul Frappiér – trumpet on "Angel of Individuation"
- Hi Lo Singers – vocals on "Angel of Sovereignty", "Haelegen II", and "Antigone II"
- Seth Manchester – mixing
- Caley Monahan-Ward – tracking
- Charlotte Mundy – soprano voice on "Djennaration", "Caela", "Before I Knew the Truth", "Ananon", "Angel of Individuation", and "Antigone II"
- Chris Ott – trombone on "Angel of Individuation"
- Jake Rudin – flute on "Djennaration", "Caela", "Haelegen II", "93696", and "Antigone II"; ocarina on "Red Crown II"
- Prague Strings – strings on "Djennaration", "Before I Knew the Truth", "Ananon", and "Angel of Individuation"
- Richard Salino – tracking

== See also ==
- 2023 in American music
- List of 2023 albums
