= Aesthethica =

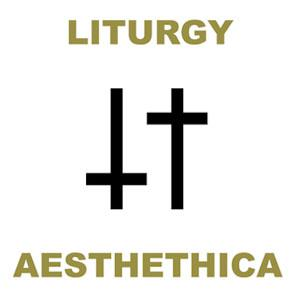

Studio album by Liturgy
- Released: May 10, 2011
- Recorded: December 2010–January 2011
- Genres: Black metal; avant-garde metal; math rock; noise rock
- Length: 68:26
- Label: Thrill Jockey
- Producer: Colin Marston

Liturgy chronology
Renihilation (2009)	Aesthethica (2011)	The Ark Work (2015)

Aesthethica is the second studio album by Brooklyn-based black metal band Liturgy. Produced by Krallice guitarist Colin Marston, the album was released on May 10, 2011, via Thrill Jockey.

Spin ranked it as number 26 on Spin's 50 Best Albums of 2011, and Pitchfork placed the album at number 41 on its list of the "Top 50 albums of 2011".

== Critical reception ==
Professional ratings
Aggregate scores
Source	Rating
Metacritic	72/100
Review scores
Source	Rating
AllMusic	5/5 stars
The A.V. Club	A−
Consequence of Sound	D
The Guardian	3/5 stars
Pitchfork	8.3/10
PopMatters	8/10
Sputnikmusic	3.5/5 stars
Tiny Mix Tapes	4.5/5 marks

Upon its release, Aesthethica received positive reviews from music critics. At Metacritic, which assigns a normalized rating out of 100 to reviews from critics, the album received an average score of 72, which indicates "generally favorable reviews", based on 13 reviews.

In a review for AllMusic, critic reviewer Thom Jurek wrote: "Aesthethica consists of intricate, sophisticated songs, full of majesty, nearly insane drive, intention, and the frighteningly unleashed power of emotion. This is extreme music. It may come to define or utterly transcend metal, but it doesn't matter because this album is in its own class." Jason Heller of The A.V. Club said the album "carries plenty of Renihilation's momentum." At The Guardian, Jamie Thomson explained: "While their second album ticks off plenty of genre tropes – bloodcurdling screamed vocals, kinetic drum blasts, and the kind of left-field musical excursions that are now de rigueur for any reasonably experimental BM band – it is difficult to escape the impression of Liturgy as chin-stroking dilettantes."

=== Accolades ===
Publications' year-end list appearances for Aesthethica
Critic/Publication	List	Rank	Ref
The Needle Drop	The Needle Drop's Top 50 Albums of 2011	8	
Pitchfork	Pitchfork's Top 50 Albums of 2011	41	
The Quietus	The Quietus' Top 50 Albums of 2011	50	
Spin	Spin Magazine's Top 50 Albums of 2011	26	
Stereogum	Stereogum's Top 20 Albums of 2011 - Mid-Year	18	
Tiny Mix Tapes	Tiny Mix Tapes' Top 50 Albums of 2011	49	
Treble	Treble's Top 50 Albums of 2011	36	

== Track listing ==
All tracks are written by Haela Hunt-Hendrix.

Aesthethica track listing
No.	Title	Length
1.	"High Gold"	5:16
2.	"True Will"	5:27
3.	"Returner"	3:35
4.	"Generation"	7:07
5.	"Tragic Laurel"	4:05
6.	"Sun of Light"	6:55
7.	"Helix Skull"	2:32
8.	"Glory Bronze"	6:45
9.	"Veins of God"	7:54
10.	"Red Crown"	7:23
11.	"Glass Earth"	3:28
12.	"Harmonia"	7:59
Total length:		68:26

"Harmonia" contains a hidden track on the CD version. The song itself lasts for approximately 5:31 and the hidden track lasts for approximately 1:37, with just under a minute of silence between them. Additionally, "Sun of Light" contains just under a minute of silence after the song. Both silences and the hidden track are omitted from the vinyl edition; however, "Veins of God" has an extended coda on the vinyl pressing that stretches the song's length to approximately 9:28.

== Personnel ==
Band members

- Haela Hunt-Hendrix – guitar, vocals
- Tyler Dusenbury – bass
- Greg Fox – drums
- Bernard Gann – guitar

Production

- Heba Kadry – mastering
- Colin Marston – production, engineering, mixing
