= Kairon; IRSE! =

Finnish rock band

- Origin: Seinäjoki, Finland
- Genres: psychedelic rock; progressive rock; shoegaze; post-rock
- Years active: 2009–present
- Label: Svart Records
- Members: Johannes Kohal; Lasse Luhta; Dmitry Melet; Niko Lehdontie
- Website: kaironirse.bandcamp.com

Kairon; IRSE! is a progressive rock and shoegaze band from Finland. According to Guitarist Niko Lehdontie, the band's name "means nothing" and is "just meant to be as annoying as possible." Lehdontie has compared the band's sound to Gentle Giant, Todd Rundgren, the Flaming Lips, and My Bloody Valentine. The band has also been compared to King Crimson, Ornette Coleman, Fairport Convention, Jon Anderson, Utopia, and Dream Theater. Clash Magazine has called Kairon; IRSE! "kind of an accidental cult success".

== Members ==
=== Current line-up ===
- Johannes Kohal – drums (2009–present)
- Dmitry Melet – bass, vocals (2009–present)
- Lasse Luhta – guitar (2009–present)
- Niko Lehdontie – guitar (2009–present)

== Albums ==
- The Defect In That One Is Bleach / We're Hunting Wolverines (2011)
- Ujubasajuba (2014)
- Ruination (2017)
- Polysomn (2020)
