= Mirror Reaper =

Studio album by Bell Witch
- Released: October 20, 2017
- Studio: Hallowed Halls in Portland, Oregon
- Genre: Funeral doom
- Length: 83:15
- Label: Profound Lore
- Producer: Billy Anderson; Bell Witch

Bell Witch chronology
| Four Phantoms (2015) | Mirror Reaper (2017) | Future's Shadow Part 1: The Clandestine Gate (2023) |

Mirror Reaper is the third studio album by Seattle-based metal band Bell Witch. It was released as a double album on October 20, 2017, through Profound Lore Records and was met with critical acclaim. This is the group's first release since the death of its drummer, Adrian Guerra, and it acts as a tribute to him.

== Background ==
Shortly before Mirror Reaper's recording began, drummer and cofounder Adrian Guerra left the band due to health concerns and was replaced by Jesse Shreibman on drums. Guerra died not long after departing from Bell Witch. When news of the death reached the group, Mirror Reaper's tone shifted. About the passing of Guerra, Mirror Reaper's press release said:

"During the writing process we were devastated by the loss of our dear friend and former drummer, Adrian Guerra. In love and respect to his memory, we reserved an important yet brief section in the song for him that features unused vocal tracks from our last album. This specific movement serves as a conceptual turn in the piece, or point of reflection. We believe he would be proud of it as well."

Mirror Reaper's artwork, a painting titled "Essence of Freedom" by Polish artist Mariusz Lewandowski, which was commissioned by Bell Witch for the album, strongly resembles the works of Zdzisław Beksiński, who is Lewandowski's primary inspiration. Lewandowski gained a lot of recognition in the extreme metal scene for the cover and his works have appeared on several other albums since then. Live performances in support of the album were often accompanied by a narrative–visual collage created by Seattle artist Taylor Bednarz. The backing footage comprised dozens of archival films that progressed like a dream sequence alongside the performance.

== Composition ==
Mirror Reaper was conceived as a single 80+ minute song. Due to CD and vinyl time limitations, the track was divided on those releases, but its initial, singular form is retained on the album's digital version. Unlike most metal albums, guitar isn't present; instead, the album is composed of bass, drums, vocals, and occasionally a Hammond organ.

"Mirror Reaper"
This clip from 29 minutes into "Mirror Reaper" shows the composition's slow pace and weighty sound.

Bassist and co-founding member Dylan Desmond employs his instrument as the driving force of the music. Bell Witch's new drummer, Jesse Shreibman, provides death growl vocals, while Desmond's singing is clean. Additional vocals from former drummer Adrian Guerra appear, having been recorded and cut from the band's previous album. Mirror Reaper closes with a section featuring guest vocals from Erik Moggridge, ending somberly and gently.

== Critical reception ==
Professional ratings
Aggregate scores
| Source | Rating |
|---|---|
| Metacritic | 85/100 |
Review scores
| Source | Rating |
| The A.V. Club | A− |
| Exclaim! | 8/10 |
| Pitchfork | 8/10 |
| PopMatters | 8/10 stars |
| Sputnikmusic | 2.9/5 |

Mirror Reaper was met with critical acclaim. The album received an average score of 85/100 from 6 reviews on Metacritic, indicating "universal acclaim". In his Exclaim! review for the album, Cole Firth wrote, "Mirror Reaper is certainly an outstanding accomplishment in the Bell Witch catalogue. It may be their most emotionally stirring and musically ambitious record to date." Sasha Geffen of Pitchfork said, "Mourning overwhelms the mourner; it often feels as though it is the whole world. Mirror Reaper simulates that totality of grief, but it also transcends its own function as a eulogy." Writing for PopMatters, Thomas Britt praised the meaningfulness of the song's protracted length, saying, "The concluding impression, through repeated listens, is that Mirror Reaper is appropriately scaled to its subject and stakes [...] Implicitly, the record poses the question: If this hour-plus feels long, what must forever feel like?"

Mirror Reaper appeared on many publications' year-end lists.

=== Accolades ===
| Year | Publication | Country | Accolade | Rank |
|---|---|---|---|---|
| 2017 | Decibel | United States | "Top 40 Albums of 2017" | 11 |
| 2017 | Exclaim! | Canada | "Top 10 Metal and Hardcore Albums of 2017" | 5 |
| 2017 | Loudwire | United States | "25 Best Metal Albums of 2017" | 10 |
| 2017 | Metal Hammer | United Kingdom | "100 Best Metal Albums of 2017" | 59 |
| 2017 | PopMatters | United States | "The Best Metal of 2017" | 1 |
| 2017 | The Quietus | United Kingdom | "The Best Metal Albums of 2017" | 5 |
| 2017 | Rolling Stone | United States | "20 Best Metal Albums of 2017" | 13 |

== Track listing ==
Self-released digital edition
| No. | Title | Length |
|---|---|---|
| 1. | "Mirror Reaper" | 83:15 |

Profound Lore 2xCD release
| No. | Title | Length |
|---|---|---|
| 1. | "Mirror Reaper Pt. 1 – As Above" | 48:13 |
| 2. | "Mirror Reaper Pt. 2 – So Below" | 35:30 |
| Total length: | | 83:43 |

Profound Lore 2xLP release
| No. | Title | Length |
|---|---|---|
| 1. | "As" | 17:19 |
| 2. | "Above" | 21:01 |
| 3. | "So" | 22:29 |
| 4. | "Below" | 23:03 |
| Total length: | | 83:52 |

== Personnel ==
Bell Witch

- Dylan Desmond – 6-string bass, vocals
- Jesse Shreibman – percussion, Hammond organ, vocals

Additional musicians

- Adrian Guerra – additional vocals ("The Words of the Dead")
- Erik Moggridge – additional vocals in "So Below"

Production

- Billy Anderson – production, engineering, mixing
- Justin Weis – mastering
- Mariusz Lewandowski – artwork
- Taylor Bednarz – live video, film

== Charts ==
| Chart (2017) | Peak position |
|---|---|
| US Billboard Heatseekers | 12 |
