= Liturgy (band) =

American black metal band

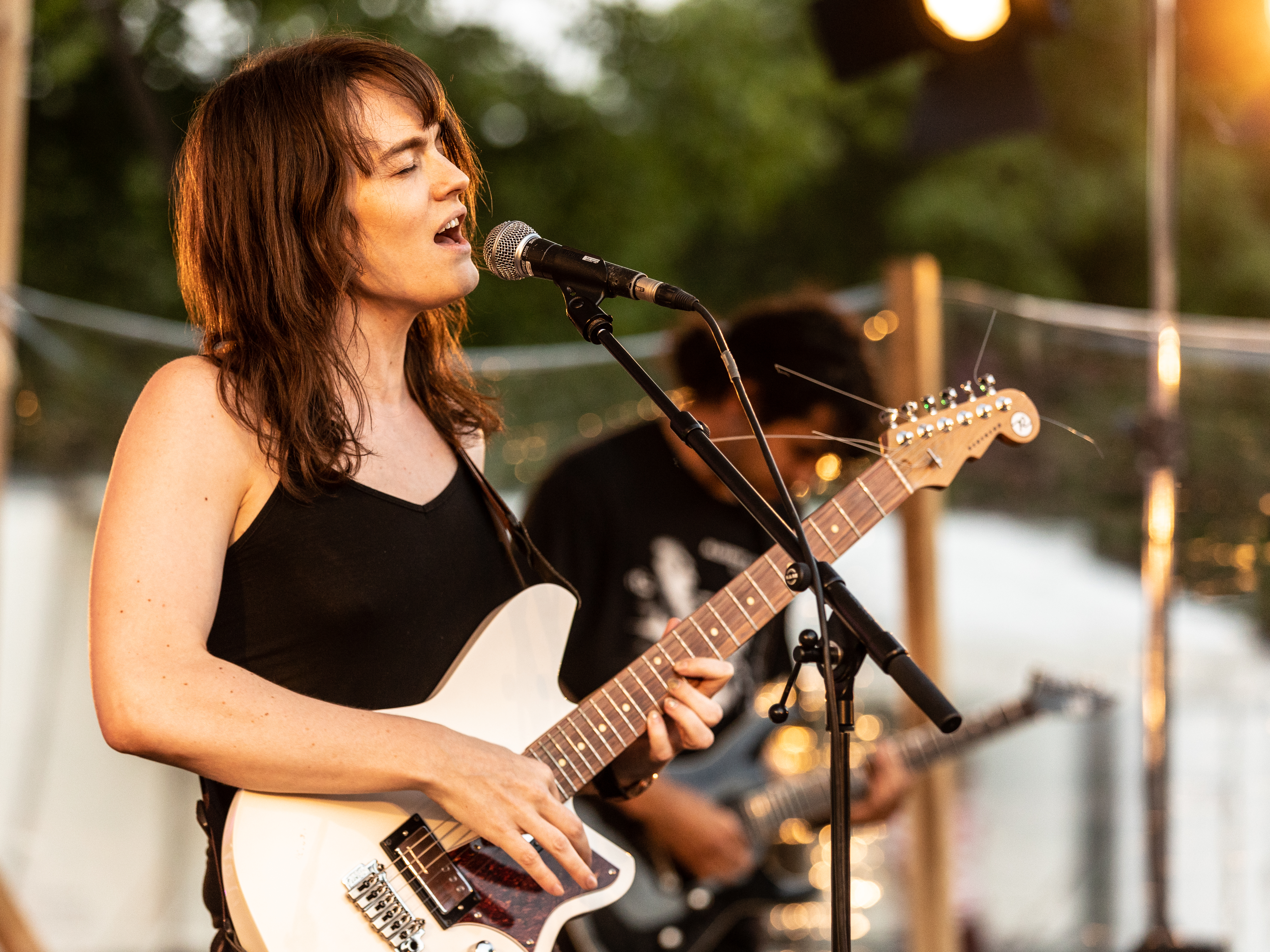
- Hunt-Hendrix at the Moers Festival 2022

Background information
- Origin: Brooklyn, New York City, U.S.
- Genres: Black metal; avant-garde metal; experimental rock
- Years active: 2005–present
- Labels: YLYLCYN; 20 Buck Spin; Thrill Jockey
- Members: Haela Hunt-Hendrix
- Past members: Tyler Dusenbury; Greg Fox; Bernard Gann; Mario Miron; Tia Vincent-Clark; Leo Didkovsky
- Website: arkwork.org

Liturgy is an American black metal band from Brooklyn, New York City. The band have described their music as "transcendental black metal," particularly in a manifesto founding member Haela Hunt-Hendrix wrote. While transforming their black metal style, they have experimented with progressive rock, hip hop and electronic music. Early on, Hunt-Hendrix cited Swans, Glenn Branca, Rhys Chatham, La Monte Young and Lightning Bolt as influences.

== History ==
Originally a solo project of Haela Hunt-Hendrix, the band expanded to a four-piece in 2008, after the release of the 12" Immortal Life, followed in 2009 with their debut album, Renihilation. The group released their second album, Aesthethica, in May 2011 on Thrill Jockey. It was ranked 26 on Spin's 50 Best Albums of 2011.

In 2012, Hunt-Hendrix told Pitchfork Media she wanted to move away from black metal to avoid "self-imitation," noting that Aesthethica's recognition "turns it into safe territory." She suggested that the next release could include bells or focus on electronics. In June 2014, the band recorded The Ark Work, released in 2015. Spin and Rolling Stone named it the #1 avant garde album of 2015. Hunt-Hendrix released her debut electronic album, New Introductory Lectures on the System of Transcendental Qabala, as Kel Valhaal in 2016, following the same themes as Liturgy's songwriter.

Hunt-Hendrix composed, directed, and starred in the video opera “Origin of the Alimonies,” screened at National Sawdust in New York City in October 2018. It included a live score performed by Liturgy and an eleven-piece chamber ensemble. In November 2019, a live-action version of the opera was staged at REDCAT in Los Angeles. Liturgy performed with the Sonic Boom Ensemble, and the opera featured performers Jeremy Toussaint-Baptiste and Kathleen Dycaico, with choreography by Gillian Wash and light design by Matthew Schreiber.

The band surprised-released H.A.Q.Q. in November 2019, with a physical release following five months later. The album is tied to a series of YouTube philosophical lectures by Hunt-Hendrix, detailing concepts portrayed by the diagram on its cover.

Hunt-Hendrix came out as transgender in May 2020, and the band released Origin of the Alimonies in November. Sixth studio album 93696 followed in March 2023.

On June 30, 2026, the band announced an archival release of previously unreleased recordings, including The Paranoiac Miracle (2005), Eternal Void (2006), Immortal Life (2007), and Harmonium (2008). They were released on July 4, 2026.

== Band members ==
Current members

- Haela Hunt-Hendrix – vocals, guitar (2005–present), electronics (2015–present)

Former members

- Greg Fox – drums (2009–2011, 2014–2018)
- Tyler Dusenbury – bass guitar (2009–2012, 2014–2018)
- Bernard Gann – guitar (2009–2020)
- Mario Miron – guitar (2020–2024)
- Tia Vincent-Clark – bass guitar (2018–2024)
- Leo Didkovsky – drums (2018–2024)

== Discography ==
=== Studio albums ===
- Renihilation (20 Buck Spin, 2009)
- Aesthethica (Thrill Jockey, 2011)
- The Ark Work (Thrill Jockey, 2015)
- H.A.Q.Q. (2019)
- Origin of the Alimonies (2020)
- 93696 (2023)

=== EPs ===
- Eternal Void (2006)
- Immortal Life (Unfun CD release, 2007) – (Infinite Limbs vinyl release, 2008)
- As the Blood of God Bursts the Veins of Time (2022)
- Immortal Life II (2024)

=== Other releases ===
- The Paranoiac Miracle LP (2005)
- Harmonium LP (2008)
- split LP with Oval (Thrill Jockey, 2011)
- "Quetzalcoatl" single (Thrill Jockey, 2015)
- "PASAQALIA II" single (2020)
- "Antigone" single feat. Leya (2020)
