= List of Southern Methodist University people =

This is a list of notable alumni, faculty, and students of Southern Methodist University. Those individuals who qualify for multiple categories have been placed under the section for which they are best known.

== Notable alumni and attendees ==
=== Politics and government ===
==== Foreign government ====
- Fadel Mohammed Ali (M.S. 1978) – Jordanian former director of the Royal Maintenance Corps of the Jordanian Armed Forces
- Fahad Almubarak (B.S.) – governor, Central Bank of the Kingdom of Saudi Arabia
- Catherine Bamugemereire (LL.M. 2003) – justice of the Constitutional Court and Court of Appeal of Uganda, the second-highest judicial organ in Uganda
- Gela Bezhuashvili (LL.M. 1997) – Georgian former head of the Georgian Intelligence Service, Minister of Defense, Minister of Foreign Affairs
- Charles Brumskine (LL.M. 1982) – Liberian leader of the Liberty Party, former president pro tempore of the Liberian Senate
- Mirsad Hadžikadić (PhD 1987) – professor and director of the Institute of Complex Systems at the University of North Carolina at Charlotte and candidate for presidency of Bosnia and Herzegovina in the 2018 election
- Susan Kihika – governor of Nakuru County, Republic of Kenya
- S. M. Krishna (LL.M. 1959) – Indian former minister of external affairs, governor of Maharashtra, chief minister of Karnataka
- Bagir Manan – chief justice of the Supreme Court of Indonesia
- Reynato Puno (LL.M. 1967) – 22nd chief justice of the Supreme Court of the Philippines (2007–2010), 131st associate justice of the Supreme Court of the Philippines (1993–2007)
- Gillian Triggs (LL.M. '72) – president of the Australian Human Rights Commission
- Elizabeth Gomani-Chindebvu (MS 1998, PhD 2004) - Malawian paleontologist and senior civil servant, serving as the Principal Secretary in Malawi's Ministry of Local Government, Unity and Culture.

==== U.S. government ====
===== U.S. cabinet/White House =====
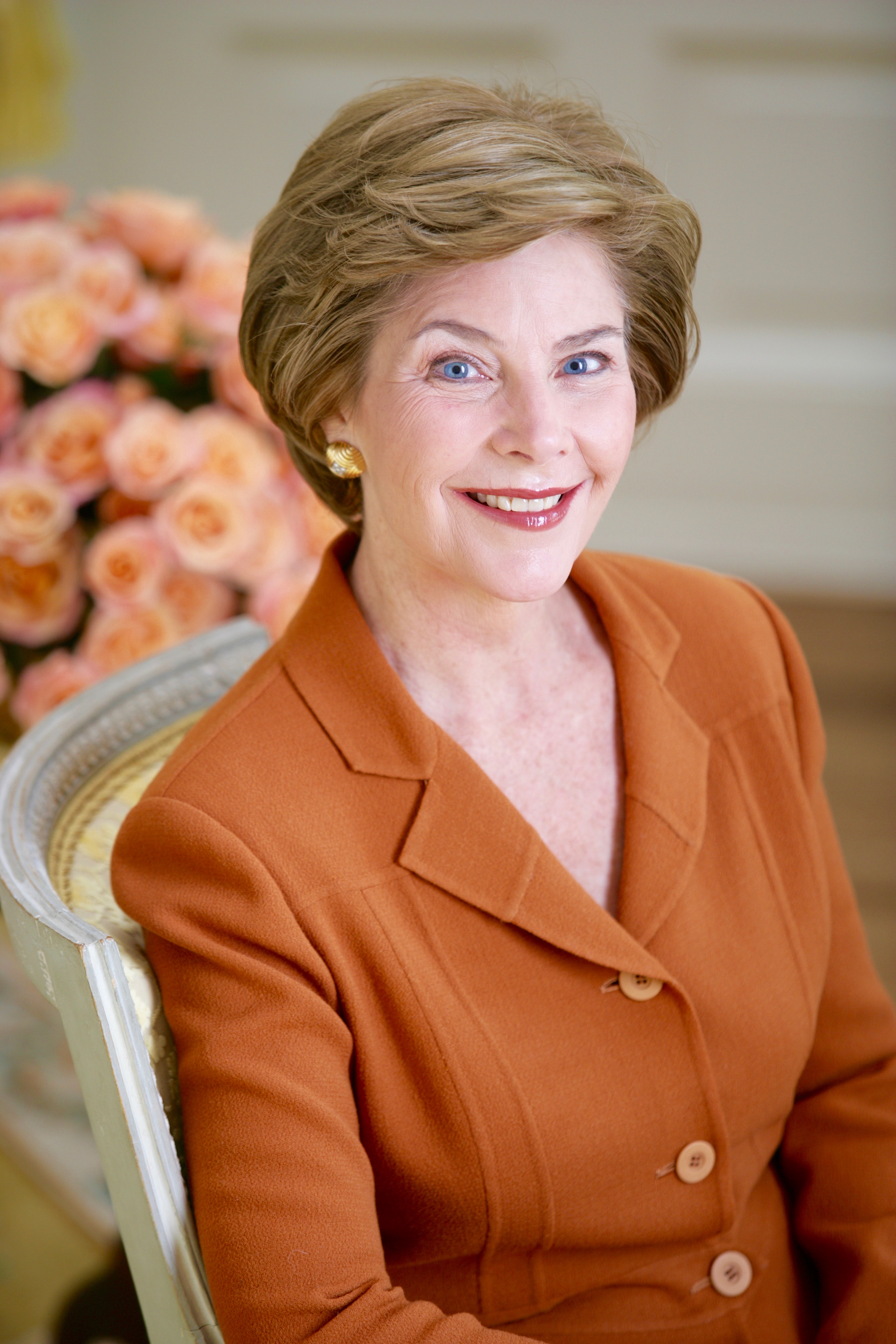
First Lady Laura Bush

- Laura Bush (B.S. 1968) – First Lady of the United States (2001–2009), First Lady of Texas (1995–2000)
- Bill Clements (attended) – U.S. deputy secretary of defense (1973–1977)
- Hope Hicks (B.A. 2010) – former White House communications director, former press secretary for Donald Trump's 2016 presidential campaign and presidential transition team
- Karen Hughes (B.A. 1977) – former under secretary for public diplomacy and public affairs, counselor to the president, White House communications director
- Jo Jorgensen (MBA 1980) – Libertarian Party's nominee in the 2020 election, first woman to become the Libertarian nominee, and the only female 2020 presidential candidate with ballot access to over 270 electoral votes
- John Lee Ratcliffe (J.D. 1989) – current director of the Central Intelligence Agency, former director of national intelligence, former member of the U.S. House of Representatives from Texas representing the 4th district
- Chad Wolf (B.A. 1998) – acting secretary, United States Department of Homeland Security, and under secretary of Homeland Security for Strategy, Policy, and Plans; previously chief of staff of the United States Department of Homeland Security and chief of staff of the Transportation Security Administration

===== U.S. Senate =====
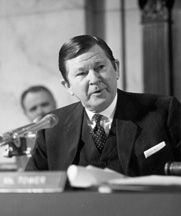
U.S. Senator John Tower of Texas

- Bob Krueger (B.A. 1957) – former U.S. senator and member of the U.S. House of Representatives from Texas, U.S. ambassador to Botswana, U.S. ambassador to Burundi
- Rick Scott (J.D. 1978) – U.S. senator from Florida
- John Tower (M.A. 1951) – former U.S. senator from Texas

===== U.S. House of Representatives =====
- John Wiley Bryant (B.A. 1969, J.D. 1972) – former member of the U.S. House of Representatives from Texas
- Jim Chapman (J.D. 1970) – former member of the U.S. House of Representatives from Texas
- James M. Collins (B.S. 1937) – former member of the U.S. House of Representatives from Texas
- John Culberson (B.A. 1981) – former member of the U.S. House of Representatives from Texas
- Bob Franks (J.D. 1976) – former member of the U.S. House of Representatives from New Jersey, chairman of the New Jersey Republican State Committee
- Ralph Hall (LL.B. 1951) – former member of the U.S. House of Representatives from Texas
- Eddie Bernice Johnson (M.P.A. 1976) – former member of the U.S. House of Representatives from Texas
- Sam Johnson (B.B.A. 1951) – former member of the U.S. House of Representatives from Texas
- Bob Krueger (B.A. 1957) – former member of the U.S. House of Representatives from Texas, U.S. ambassador to Botswana, U.S. ambassador to Burundi
- Dennis Moore (attended) – former member of the U.S. House of Representatives from Kansas
- John Lee Ratcliffe (J.D. 1989) – former member of the U.S. House of Representatives from Texas representing the 4th district, 2015–2020
- Lamar Smith (J.D. 1975) – former member of the U.S. House of Representatives from Texas

===== U.S. ambassadors and diplomats =====
- Rena Bitter (J.D. 1991) – former U.S. ambassador to Laos, nominee for assistant secretary of state for consular affairs
- Teel Bivins (J.D. 1976) – former U.S. ambassador to Sweden, member of the Texas Senate
- Tony Garza (J.D. 1983) – former U.S. ambassador to Mexico, Texas railroad commissioner, 98th secretary of state of Texas
- Roy M. Huffington (B.S. 1938) – former U.S. ambassador to Austria
- Bob Krueger (B.A. 1957) – former U.S. ambassador to Botswana, U.S. ambassador to Burundi
- George C. McGhee (attended) – former U.S. ambassador to Turkey, U.S. ambassador to West Germany, under secretary of state for political affairs
- Jeanne L. Phillips (B.A. 1976) – former U.S. ambassador to the Organisation for Economic Co-operation and Development
- Elizabeth Holzhall Richard (B.A. 1981, J.D. 1984) – current U.S. ambassador to Lebanon
- Roy R. Rubottom Jr. (B.A. 1933) – former U.S. ambassador to Argentina, assistant secretary for inter-American affairs

===== State governors =====
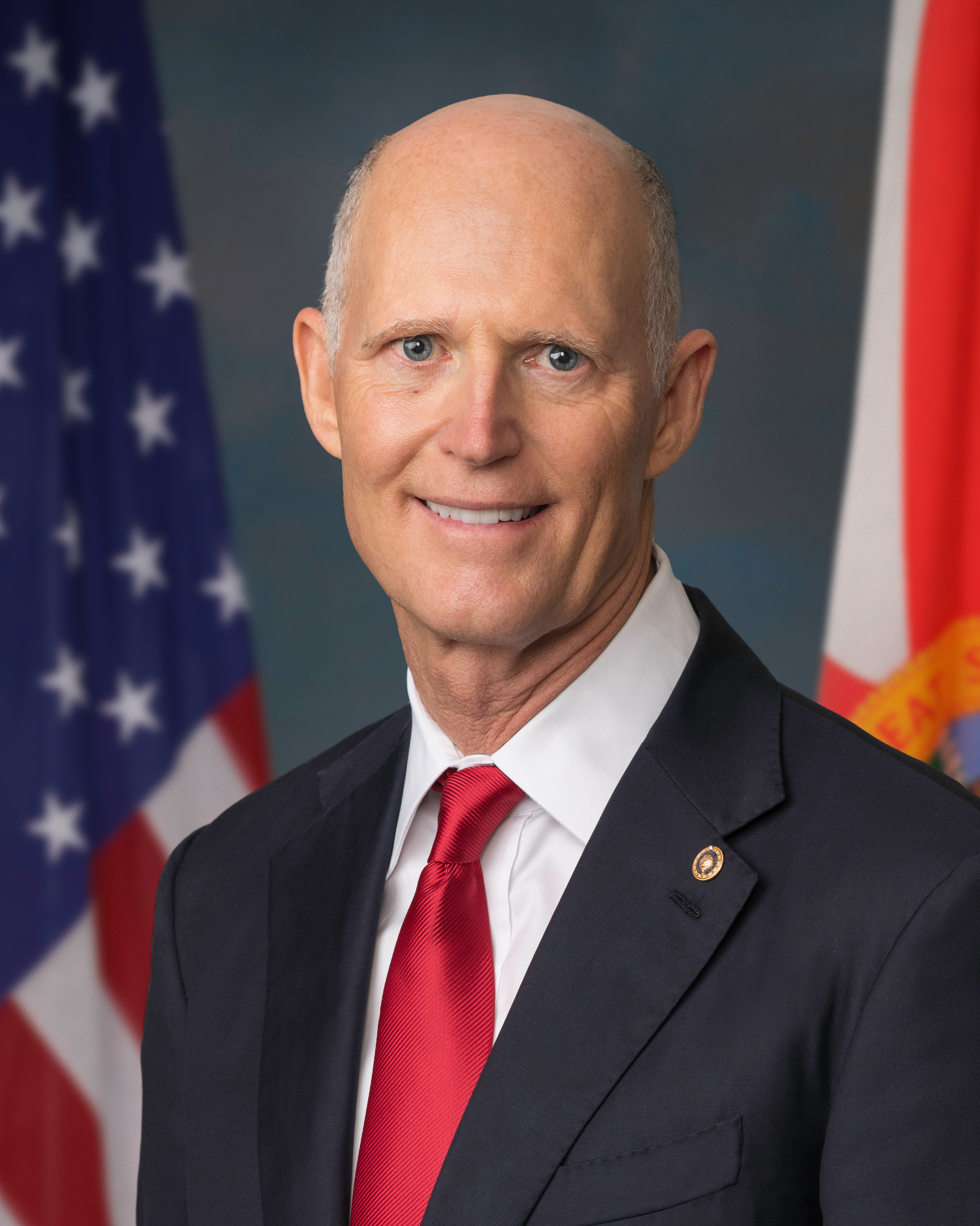
Former governor and now U.S. Senator Rick Scott of Florida

- Bill Clements (attended) – 42nd and 44th governor of Texas (1979–1983; 1987–1991), U.S. deputy secretary of defense (1973–1977)
- Rick Scott (J.D. 1978) – 45th governor of Florida (2011–2019)

===== State legislators =====
- Rafael Anchia (B.A. 1990) – current member of the Texas House of Representatives
- Leo Berman (B.A. 1969) – former member of the Texas House of Representatives, member of the city council of Arlington, Texas
- Dan Branch (J.D.) – former member of the Texas House of Representatives
- Raleigh Brown – member of the Texas House of Representatives; Texas State District Court judge in Abilene
- Jim R. Caldwell (M.S.) – former member of the Arkansas Senate, chairman of the Arkansas Republican Party
- Mickey Dollens (B.A. 2011) – current member of the Oklahoma House of Representatives
- Charlie Geren (B.B.A. 1971) – member of the Texas House of Representatives from his native Fort Worth
- Christine Hamm – member of the New Hampshire House of Representatives
- Ike Harris (J.D. 1960) – member of the Texas Senate (1967–1995), president pro tempore of the Texas Senate (1973)
- Todd Ames Hunter (Law '78) – member of the Texas House of Representatives from Corpus Christi (Democrat, 1989–1997; Republican, since 2009)
- Jim Keet (B.B.A. 1971) – 2010 Republican nominee for governor of Arkansas, member of the Arkansas Senate (1993–1997), member of the Arkansas House of Representatives (1989–1991)
- Bill Keffer (B.A. 1981) – member of the Texas House of Representatives (2003–2007)
- Sharon Keller – presiding judge of the Texas Court of Criminal Appeals
- R. Kirk McPike (B.A. 2005) – member of the Virginia House of Delegates from District 5 since 2026
- Morgan Meyer – Republican member of the Texas House of Representatives from District 108 in Dallas County, including University Park
- Barrow Peacock – Republican member of the Louisiana State Senate from Shreveport
- E. J. Pipkin (M.S. 2014) – Republican member of the Maryland Senate (2003–2013)
- Ana-Maria Ramos (J.D.) – member of the Texas House of Representatives
- Matt Shaheen – Republican member of the Texas House of Representatives from Plano, effective 2015; former Collin County commissioner; received master's degree from SMU
- Virginia Shehee – member of the Louisiana State Senate from Shreveport, 1976 to 1980; businesswoman and philanthropist; studied social work at SMU
- Burt Solomons – Republican former member of the Texas House of Representatives from Denton County; received a Master of Public Administration degree from SMU in the early 1970s

===== Other state and local government =====
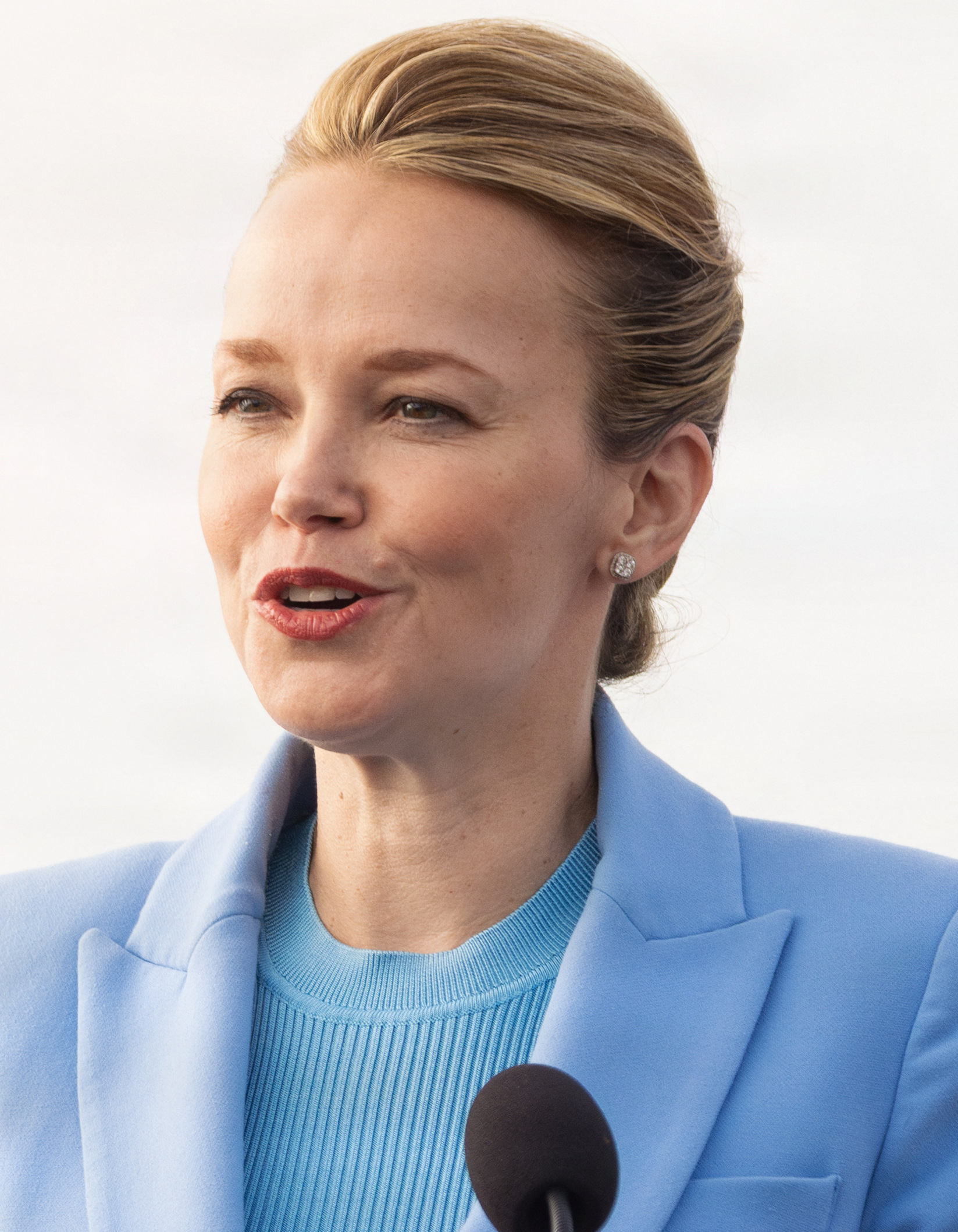
Mayor of New Orleans Helena Moreno

- Dewey F. Bartlett Jr. (M.B.A. 1971) – 39th mayor of Tulsa, Oklahoma (2009–2016), son of former U.S. senator Dewey F. Bartlett
- Joe Cobb – mayor of Roanoke, Virginia (2025–present)
- Helena Moreno (B.A. 1999) – mayor of New Orleans (2025–present), former New Orleans City Council president (2019–2025); former journalist and Democratic member of the Louisiana House of Representatives from District 93
- Barbara Staff (B.A.) – Texas Republican Party activist, Texas co-chairman of Ronald Reagan's 1976 presidential primary campaign
- Martha Whitehead (B.A. 1962) – last Texas state treasurer (1993–1996)
- Phil Wilson (M.B.A.) – 106th Texas secretary of state (2007–2008)

=== Military ===
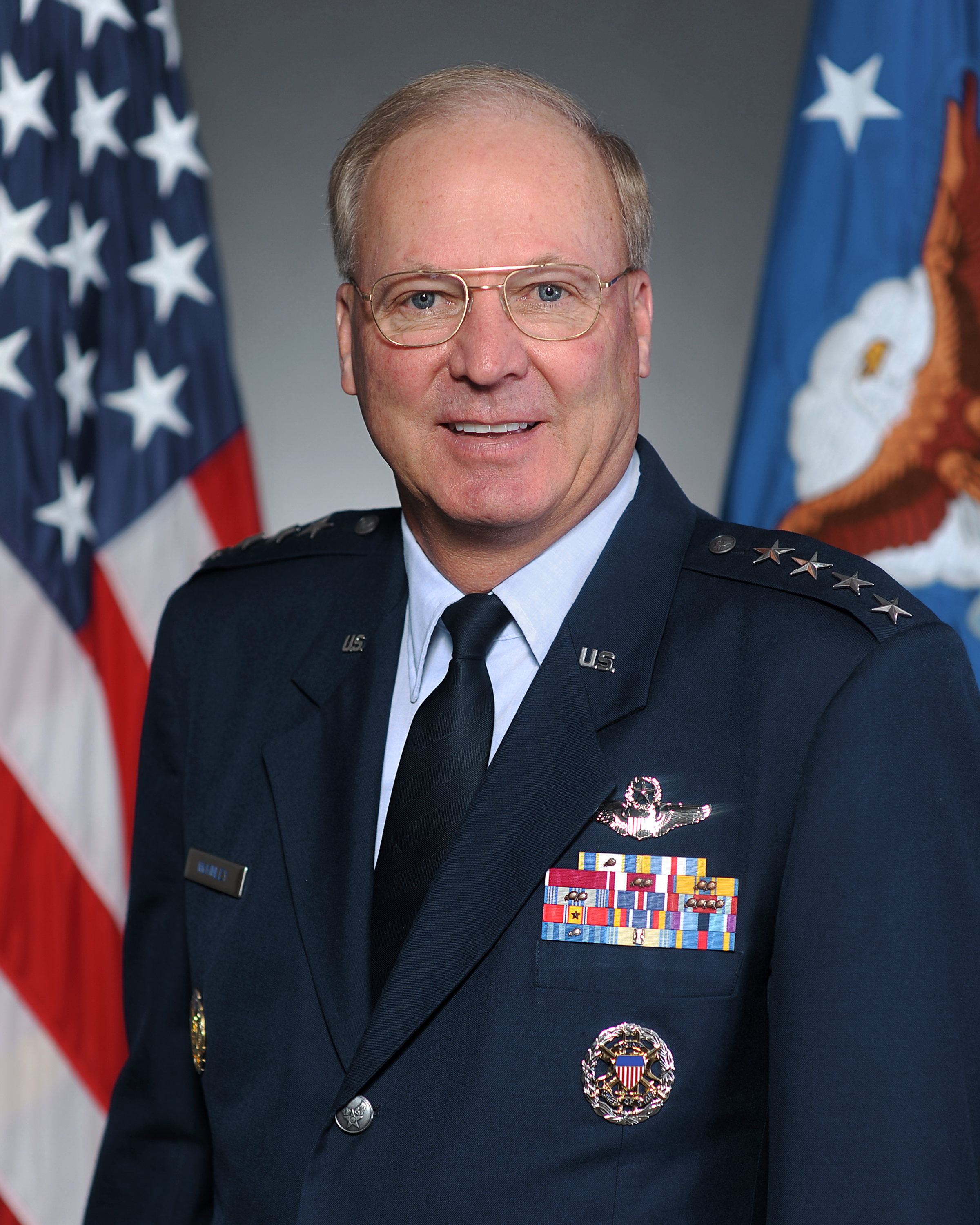
Craig R. McKinley, first general of the National Guard to gain four-star rank

- Sam Brown – U.S. Army captain; recipient of the Bronze Star Medal and Purple Heart for service in Afghanistan
- Fred E. Ellis – Air National Guard major general
- Fred E. Haynes Jr. – World War II Marine officer and later major general; brother of actor Jerry Haynes
- General Craig R. McKinley (B.B.A. 1974) – 26th chief of the National Guard Bureau (2008–2012)
- Jack Miller – World War II Marine officer; namesake of the USS Jack Miller
- Huan Nguyen – first Vietnamese-American Navy rear admiral
- Harry M. Wyatt III (B. A. in Business Administration, 1974) – attorney, retired lieutenant general of the U.S. Air Force, former adjutant general of Oklahoma, former secretary of military affairs for State of Oklahoma; J.D. from University of Tulsa School of Law (1980)

=== Business ===
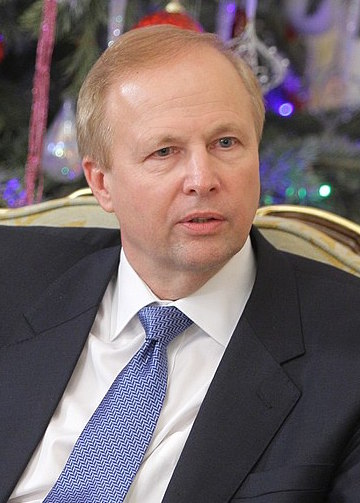
Bob Dudley, BP executive in charge of the Deepwater Horizon oil spill response

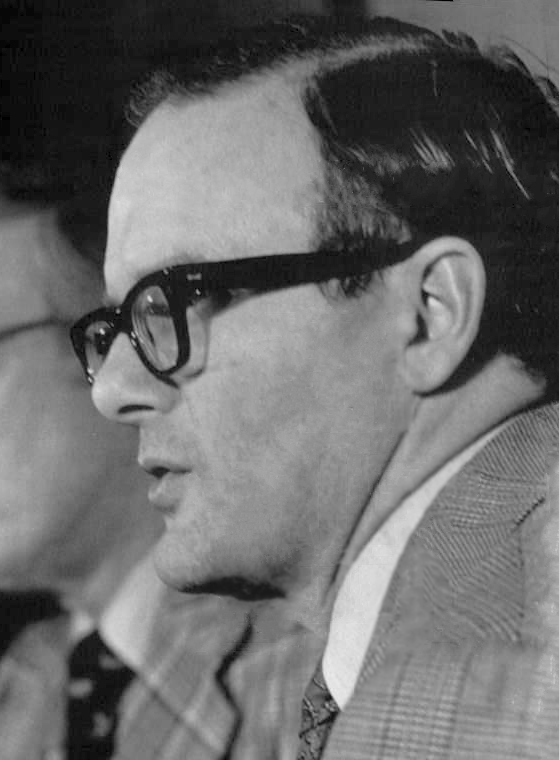
Lamar Hunt, principal founder of the American Football League and Major League Soccer

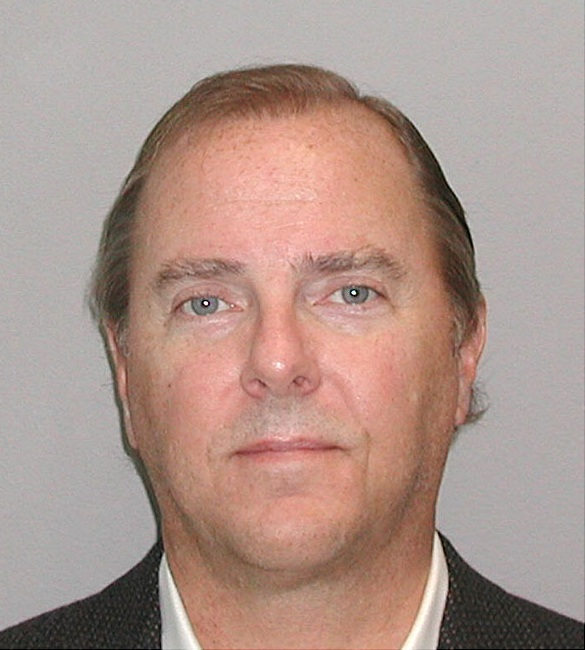
Jeffrey Skilling, CEO of Enron

- Gabriel Barbier-Mueller – founder and CEO, Harwood International
- Harry W. Bass, Jr. – owner, Vail Resorts
- Henry L. Brandon – chairman of the board, Unocal Corporation
- Lally Brennan, proprietor of Commander's Palace
- Richard L. Clemmer (MBA) – CEO of NXP Semiconductors
- Lodwrick Cook – chairman and CEO, Atlantic Richfield Company (ARCO)
- Trammell Crow – founder, Trammell Crow Company
- Álex Cruz – former CEO, British Airways
- C. David Cush – former CEO, Virgin America
- Aaron Davidson – chairman of the North American Soccer League and president of Traffic Sports USA
- Aart J. de Geus – co-founder, chairman and CEO of Synopsys
- Robert H. Dedman, Sr. – founder and CEO, ClubCorp
- Robert H. Dedman, Jr. – former CEO, ClubCorp
- David B. Dillon – president and chairman of the Kroger Co.
- Bob Dudley – CEO, BP
- Thomas Dundon (B.S. 1993) – chairman and managing partner of Dundon Capital Partners in Dallas, Texas, owner of the Carolina Hurricanes of the National Hockey League and one-quarter of TopGolf
- Sten Ekberg (BBA) – doctor of chiropractic, Olympic athlete
- J. Lindsay Embrey – chairman and CEO of First Continental Enterprises Inc. and Embrey Enterprises Inc.
- Gerald J. Ford (B.A. 1966, J.D. 1969) – Dallas-based billionaire
- Jerry Fullinwider – founder of V–F Petroleum
- Donald Holmquest – CEO, California RHIO
- Thomas W. Horton – CEO, American Airlines
- Clark Hunt (B.B.A. 1987) – current part owner, chairman, and CEO of the Kansas City Chiefs (NFL), founding investor-owner in Major League Soccer
- Helen LaKelly Hunt – founder of the Sister Fund
- Hunter L. Hunt (B.A. 1990) – current chairman and CEO of Hunt Consolidated Energy
- Lamar Hunt (B.S. 1956) – principal founder of the American Football League (AFL), Major League Soccer (MLS), and Kansas City Chiefs, owner of the Kansas City Wizards, Columbus Crew, and FC Dallas
- Ray Lee Hunt – chairman and CEO, Hunt Oil Company
- Jim Irsay (B.A. 1982) – former owner of the Indianapolis Colts of the National Football League
- Jerry Junkins – president, chairman, and CEO of Texas Instruments (1988–1996)
- Colette Kress (MBA) – interim CEO and CFO, Nvidia
- Michelle Lemmons-Poscente – founder and CEO of International Speakers Bureau
- Paul B. Loyd, Jr. – former chairman and CEO of the R&B Falcon Corporation, the world's largest offshore drilling company (1997–2001); sits on the SMU Board of Trustees
- Harold MacDowell – CEO, TDIndustries
- John H. Matthews
- Beth E. Mooney – CEO of Key Bank
- Robert Mosbacher, Jr. – Houston businessman; president of Mosbacher Energy Company, Overseas Private Investment Corporation
- Erle A. Nye – chairman and CEO, TXU
- William J. O'Neil – founder of the business newspaper Investor's Business Daily
- Eckhard Pfeiffer (MBA) – chairman and CEO, Compaq
- Robert Rowling – U.S. billionaire, No. 45 on Forbes 400
- Edward B. Rust, Jr. (MBA) – chairman and CEO, State Farm Insurance
- George Edward Seay III – businessman; co-founder and CEO of Annandale Capital; philanthropist; conservative political activist
- Mark Shepherd – chairman and CEO, Texas Instruments
- Jeffrey Skilling – chairman and CEO of Enron
- Jeff Storey – president and chief executive officer of Level 3 Communications
- Emily Summers – interior designer
- John H. Tyson – chairman of Tyson Foods
- Ray Washburne – real estate investor
- Whitney Wolfe Herd – founder and CEO, Bumble; co-founder of Tinder

=== Law ===
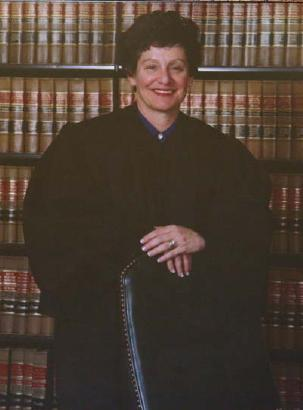
Judge Barbara M.G. Lynn of the United States District Court for the Northern District of Texas

- James A. Baker (B.B.A. 1953, LL.B. 1958) – justice of the Supreme Court of Texas (1995–2002)
- Jeff Cox (Legal Law Masters in Taxation) – judge since 2005 of the Louisiana 26th Judicial District Court of Bossier and Webster parishes
- Craig T. Enoch – justice, Texas Supreme Court
- David C. Godbey – federal judge
- Irma Carrillo Ramirez – circuit judge, 5th Circuit Court of Appeals
- Nathan Hecht – chief justice, Texas Supreme Court
- Stephen N. Limbaugh, Jr. – justice, Supreme Court of Missouri
- Barbara M.G. Lynn – judge, United States District Court for the Northern District of Texas
- Robert B. Maloney – federal judge
- Harriet Miers – George W. Bush administration nominee to the United States Supreme Court
- James Latane Noel, Jr. – attorney general of Texas
- William Steger – judge, United States District Court for the Eastern District of Texas
- Larkin Walsh – justice of Kansas Supreme Court

=== Scientists ===
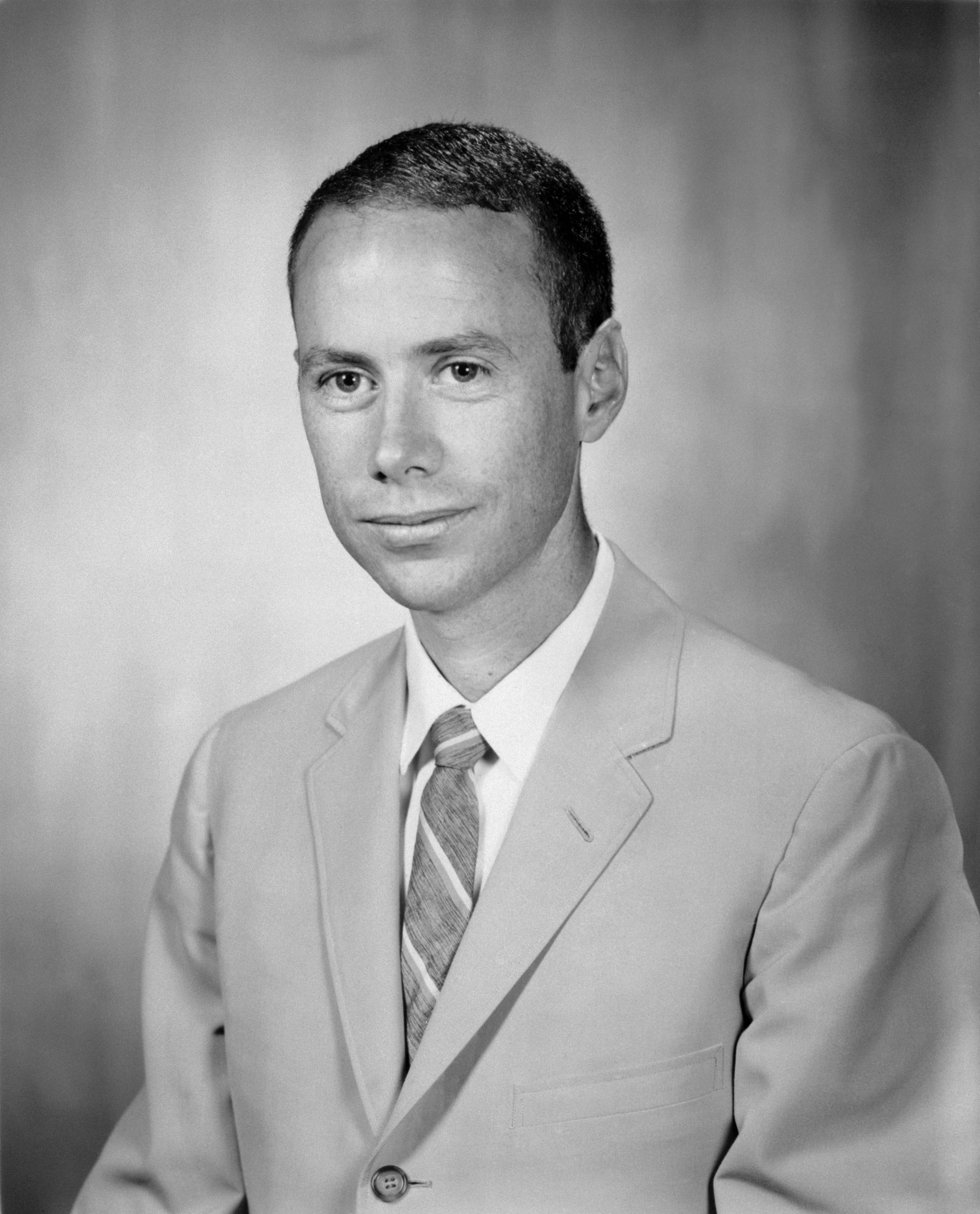
Donald Holmquest, NASA astronaut

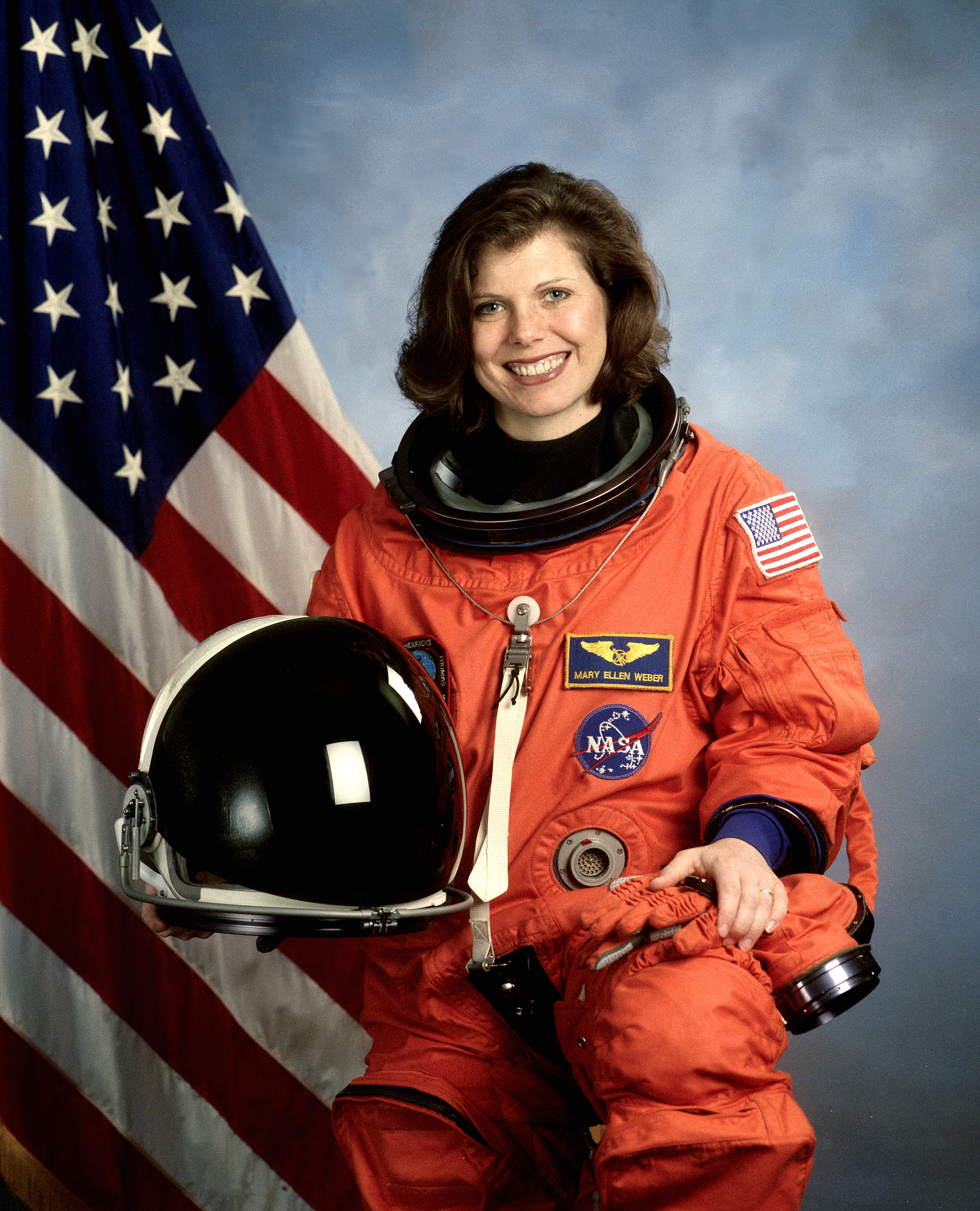
Mary Ellen Weber, NASA astronaut

- Donald D. Clayton – astrophysicist
- James Cronin – Nobel Prize-winning physicist
- Robert Dennard – computing pioneer
- Donald Holmquest – NASA astronaut, physician
- Jack N. James – engineer and manager at the Jet Propulsion Laboratory; project manager for the Mariner program
- Kent Norman – cognitive psychologist and expert on computer rage
- Andrés Ruzo – geothermal scientist and a National Geographic Young Explorer
- Clyde Snow – forensic anthropologist
- Robert Taylor – computing pioneer
- Mary E. Weber – NASA astronaut
- Donald J. Wheeler – expert on statistical process control and data analysis
- Cindy Ann Yeilding – geologist and former vice president of BP

=== Academia ===
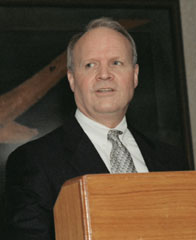
Larry Faulkner, President of the University of Texas at Austin

- Betsy Boze (née Betsy Vogel) – president, The College of The Bahamas
- Dan W. Dodson – former sociology professor at New York University
- Larry Faulkner – president, University of Texas at Austin (1998–2006)
- Lee F. Jackson – former chancellor of the University of North Texas System (2002–2017) and the State of Texas' longest-serving chancellor at the time when he announced his retirement in March 2017
- Jo Jorgensen (M.B.A. 1983) – 2020 Libertarian Party presidential candidate, senior lecturer of Industrial/Organizational Psychology at Clemson University
- Herma Hill Kay – dean, UC Berkeley School of Law
- Mary Elizabeth Moore – dean, Boston University School of Theology
- William C. Roberts – cardiologist; pathologist; first head of pathology for the National Heart, Lung and Blood Institute
- Andrea I. Robinson – master sommelier and dean of wine studies at the French Culinary Institute
- Earl Rose – Dallas County medical examiner at the time of the assassination of John F. Kennedy; pathologist at University of Iowa
- Vernon L. Scarborough (PhD 1980) – Mesoamerican archaeologist; professor and head of department in anthropology at University of Cincinnati
- Thomas F. Siems – senior economist and policy advisor in the Research Department at the Federal Reserve Bank of Dallas

=== Film, performing arts, television, radio, popular culture ===
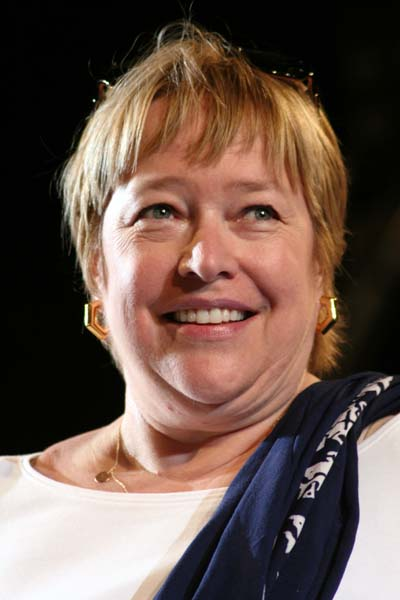
Kathy Bates, Oscar-winning actress

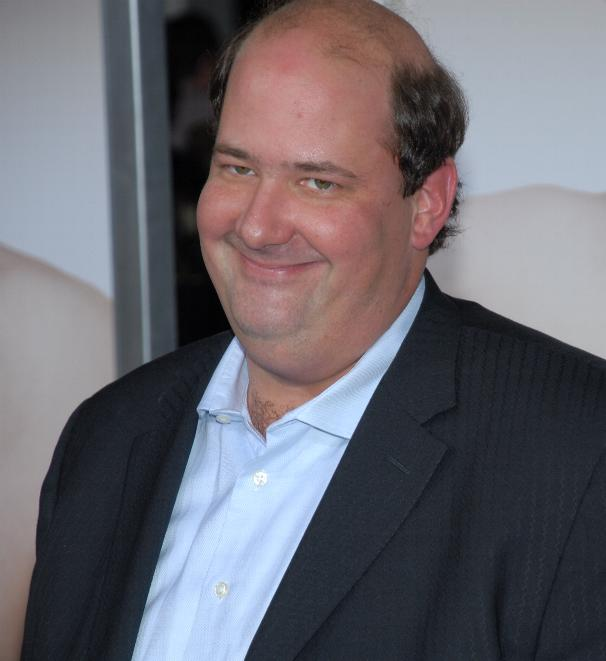
Brian Baumgartner, actor on The Office

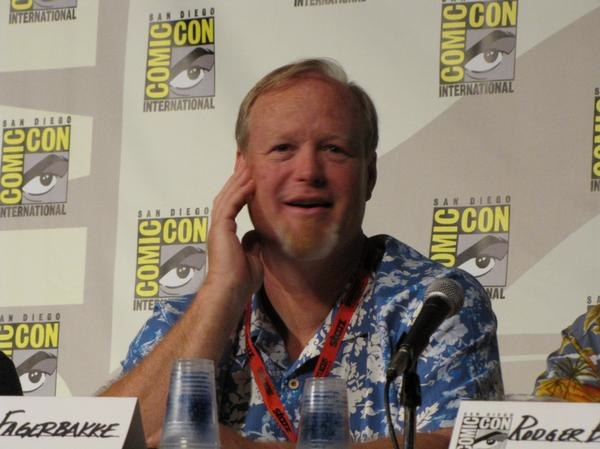
Bill Fagerbakke, the voice of Patrick Star

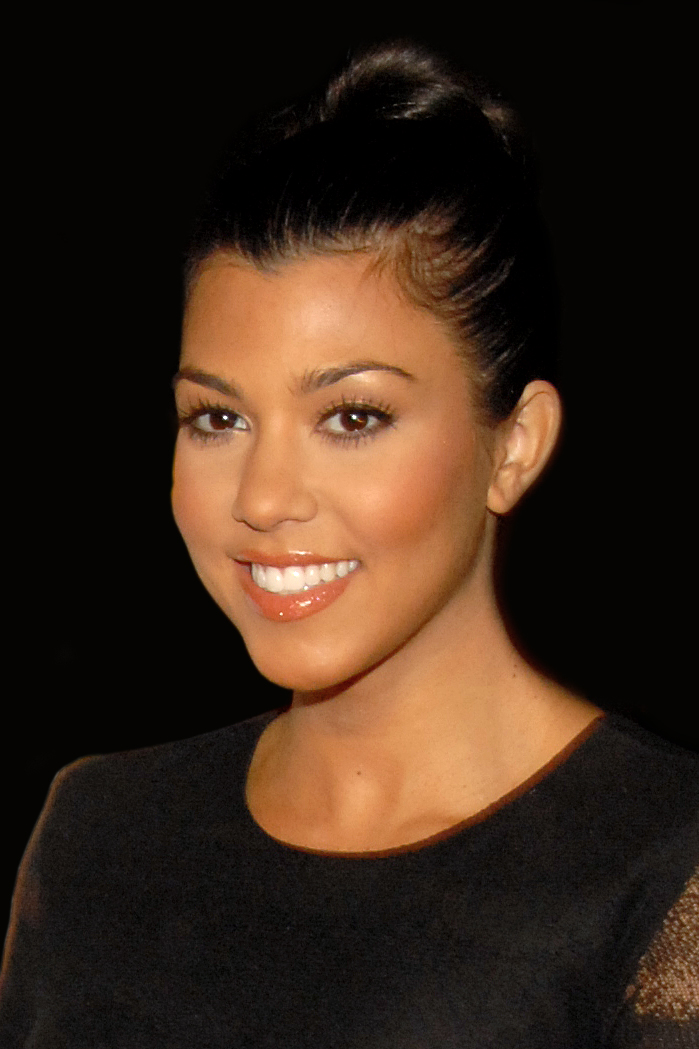
Kourtney Kardashian attended SMU, but did not graduate.

- Amy Acker – actress, BFA (Theater) 1999, Person of Interest, Angel
- Michael Aronov – actor, playwright
- Antoine Ashley (a.k.a. Sahara Davenport) – female impersonator, singer, and reality show participant (RuPaul's Drag Race)
- Astronautalis (Charles Andrew Bothwell) – hip-hop artist
- George C. Baker – organist, composer, pedagogue, and dermatologist
- Bob Banner – TV producer
- Joseph Banowetz – Grammy-nominated classical pianist; music professor
- David Barrera – actor, Generation Kill
- Adam Bartley – actor notable for television's Longmire
- David Bates – artist
- Kathy Bates – Oscar-winning actress
- Brian Baumgartner – actor on The Office
- Matt Earl Beesley – TV and film director
- Andrew-John Bethke – composer, conductor and organist
- Mary Walling Blackburn – artist
- Andy Blankenbuehler – dancer, choreographer, Hamilton, Bandstand, In the Heights
- Powers Boothe – Emmy Award-winning actor
- Cale Boyter – film producer, Wedding Crashers
- Edie Brickell – singer-songwriter, guitarist with The New Bohemians
- Allen Case – Broadway and television actor (The Deputy)
- Laura Claycomb – operatic soprano
- Eddie Coker – children's musician
- Graham Colton – pop singer, performer, songwriter
- Cristi Conaway – actress
- John-Henry Crawford – classical cellist
- Mimi Davila – from the Chonga Girls
- Paige Davis – TLC Network personality
- Stefanie de Roux – model, represented Panama in Miss Universe 2003 and Miss Earth 2006
- Fernando del Valle (Brian S. Skinner) – operatic tenor
- Irene the Alien – drag queen, reality television personality on RuPaul's Drag Race known for her alien-inspired drag
- Hacksaw Jim Duggan – pro wrestler
- Amanda Dunbar – visual artist
- Mary Elizabeth Ellis – actress known for portraying "The Waitress" on It's Always Sunny in Philadelphia
- Bill Fagerbakke – actor on Coach and voice on SpongeBob SquarePants
- Katie Featherston – lead actress in the independent horror film Paranormal Activity
- Amanda Frances – author and The Real Housewives of Beverly Hills cast member
- Morgan Garrett – voice actress affiliated with Funimation
- Clarence Gilyard – actor, Walker, Texas Ranger
- Lynda Goodfriend – actress
- Lauren Graham – lead actress, Gilmore Girls, Parenthood, and Guys and Dolls on Broadway
- Art Greenhaw – Grammy Award-winning artist, record producer and audio engineer
- Daniel Hart – musician and composer
- James V. Hart – screenwriter and author
- Jerry Haynes – actor, most well known as Mr. Peppermint, brother of Fred E. Haynes Jr., World War II Marine officer and later major general
- Thomas Hayward – chairman of the Voice and Opera departments of the Meadows School of the Arts; named distinguished professor of voice 1990; namesake of the Thomas Hayward Memorial Award scholarship
- Ian Hill – drag performer, Irene the Alien
- Jerrika Hinton – actress, Grey's Anatomy
- John Holiday – operatic countertenor
- David Hudgins – TV writer and producer, Everwood and Friday Night Lights
- Tom Hussey – photographer specializing in commercial advertising and lifestyle photography
- Jack Ingram – country music singer
- Rick Jaffa – screenwriter
- William Joyce – creator of Rolie Polie Olie and George Shrinks, Academy Award winner
- Ron Judkins – production sound mixer and writer-director
- Kourtney Kardashian (attended) – co-owner of D-A-S-H; featured on Keeping Up with the Kardashians, Kourtney and Khloé Take Miami, and Kourtney and Kim Take New York
- Marklen Kennedy – TV and film producer
- Bavand Karim – TV and film producer
- Jordan Ladd – actress and model
- Sheryl Leach – creator of Barney & Friends children's television program
- Gus Levene – arranger, composer, orchestrator, and guitarist
- Lydia Mackay – voice actress affiliated with Funimation
- Dorothy Malone – Academy Award-winning actress
- Jayne Mansfield – actress
- Page McConnell – keyboardist for Phish
- Jay McGraw – son of Dr. Phil McGraw, "Dr. Phil"
- Debra Monk – Tony Award-winning actress
- Belita Moreno – actress; Benny on the George Lopez TV series
- N'dambi – Grammy-nominated recording artist
- Jeffrey Nordling – actor, 24, Desperate Housewives, Big Little Lies, Once and Again
- Sybil Robson Orr – film producer and former news anchor
- Candice Patton – actress, The Flash
- Khary Payton – actor, The Walking Dead
- Artemis Pebdani – actress, It's Always Sunny in Philadelphia
- Lynne Strow Piccolo – operatic soprano
- Patricia Richardson – actress, Home Improvement, Strong Medicine, The West Wing
- Wolfgang Rübsam – German-American organist, pianist, composer, and pedagogue
- Saundra Santiago – actress, Miami Vice
- Wrenn Schmidt – actress
- Molly Searcy – voice and stage theatre actress
- Sarah Shahi – actress, Person of Interest and The L Word
- Joey Slotnick – actor, Boston Public, A League of Their Own
- David Lee Smith – actor, Fight Club and CSI: Miami
- Dan Smoot – journalist, author, radio, and television commentator; figure in the anti-communist movement
- Aaron Spelling – TV and film producer
- Rawson Stovall – video game producer
- Ptosha Storey – actress and singer
- Regina Taylor – playwright, director, Golden Globe-winning actress
- Carole Terry – organist, harpsichordist, and pedagogue
- Frank Ticheli – musician, composer, and professor of music composition at University of Southern California
- Craig Timberlake – stage actor and opera singer
- Stephen Tobolowsky – actor
- Tsui Hark – film director
- Shangela Laquifa Wadley – drag queen, reality television personality reality show participant (seasons 2 & 3 of RuPaul's Drag Race) and actor
- Kellie Waymire – actor, notable for her appearances in the Star Trek franchise
- Alliene Brandon Webb – composer

=== Writing and journalism ===
- Deborah Coonts – romantic, mystery, and humor novelist; lawyer
- Robert M. Edsel – art history
- Craig Flournoy – Pulitzer Prize-winning journalist
- Beth Henley – Pulitzer Prize-winning playwright
- Monika Kørra – Norwegian author and athlete
- Jack Myers – poet laureate of the state of Texas in 2003
- Matt Zoller Seitz – editor at large of RogerEbert.com, TV critic for New York Magazine and Vulture.com, and a Pulitzer Prize in criticism finalist
- Andy Sidaris – sports TV pioneer
- Michael Simms – poet, novelist and publisher
- Clifton Taulbert – author and public speaker

=== Religious ===
- Sante Uberto Barbieri – bishop of the Methodist Church in Latin America (earned bachelor's, master's and divinity degrees)
- Kirbyjon Caldwell – UM pastor and community leader in Houston, Texas, gave the benediction at George W. Bush's first inauguration
- John Wesley Hardt – bishop of the United Methodist Church
- Robert E. Hayes Jr – bishop of the United Methodist Church (M.Th. degree, 1972)
- Hiram "Doc" Jones – deputy chief of chaplains of the U.S. Air Force
- Scott J. Jones – bishop of the United Methodist Church and former McCreless Associate Professor of Evangelism and director of the Center for the Advanced Study and Practice of Evangelism, Perkins School of Theology (earned M.Th. and PhD degrees)
- Neill F. Marriott – second counselor in the Young Women's General Presidency of the Church of Jesus Christ of Latter-day Saints (earned bachelor's degree in English literature and secondary education)
- William Clyde Martin – elected bishop to the Methodist Church, 1938
- Ashley Null – Anglican theologian
- Michael W. Waters – pastor and founder of the Abundant Life African Methodist Episcopal (A.M.E.) Church in Dallas, Texas
- Cecil Williams – pastor of Glide Memorial Church (United Methodist) in San Francisco, California

=== Non-profit ===
- Brian Mushana Kwesiga – entrepreneur, engineer, and civic leader; former president and CEO, Ugandan North American Association
- Eleanor Smith Morrison – 11th national commissioner of the Boy Scouts of America

=== Athletics ===
==== Football ====
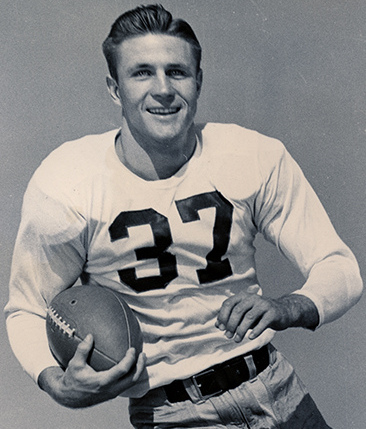
Doak Walker, Heisman Trophy winner

- Kenneth Acker – professional football player
- Jerry Ball – professional football player; three-time pro-bowler
- Chris Banjo – professional football player
- Lloyd Baxter – professional football player
- Kelvin Beachum – professional football player
- Cole Beasley – professional football player
- Raymond Berry (B.B.A. 1955) – Pro Football Hall of Fame wide receiver
- Chris Bordano – professional football player
- Maury Bray – professional football player
- John Burleson – professional football player
- Michael Carter – professional football player and Olympic silver medalist
- Russell Carter – professional football player
- Putt Choate – professional football player
- Ja'Gared Davis – professional football player
- Willard Dewveall – professional football player, first "star" to go from NFL to AFL
- Eric Dickerson – Pro Football Hall of Fame running back
- Joe Ethridge – professional football player
- Bill Forester – professional football player; elected to Green Bay Packers Hall of Fame
- Eddie Garcia – professional football player
- Ben Gottschalk (born 1992), NFL football player
- Forrest Gregg – former NFL coach and Pro Football Hall of Fame tackle
- Glynn Gregory – professional football player
- Dale Hellestrae – professional football player; played for 3 Dallas Cowboys Super Bowl teams
- Margus Hunt (class of 2013) – Cincinnati Bengals defensive end; former world junior champion in the discus and shot put, representing his homeland of Estonia
- Charlie Jackson – football player
- Craig James – football player; former commentator
- Don King – professional football player
- Josh Leribeus – professional football player
- Jerry LeVias – broke color barrier in the Southwest Conference; inducted into Texas Sports and College Football Hall of Fame
- Zach Line – professional football player
- Mike Livingston – quarterback in the American Football League and National Football League for twelve seasons with the Kansas City Chiefs
- Jerry Mays – professional football player
- Bryan McCann – professional football player for Dallas Cowboys
- Don Meredith – former Dallas Cowboys quarterback and Monday Night Football commentator
- Don Miller – professional football player
- Sterling Moore – professional football player
- Thomas Morstead – professional football player; kicker for the New Orleans Saints
- Jerry Norton – professional football player; five-time Pro Bowler
- Uzooma Okeke – professional football player
- Taylor Reed – professional football player
- Jerry Rhome – former Dallas Cowboys quarterback and College Football Hall of Fame inductee
- Mike Richardson – professional football player
- John Roderick – professional football player
- Justin Rogers – All-conference defensive end; professional football player
- Kyle Rote – professional football player; four-time Pro Bowler
- Emmanuel Sanders – professional football player; Denver Broncos
- Ray Schoenke – professional football player and entrepreneur
- Courtland Sutton – professional football player
- Taylor Thompson – professional football player
- Ted Thompson – general manager of the Green Bay Packers 2005–2017, professional football player and executive in the NFL
- Doak Walker – Heisman Trophy winner and Pro Football Hall of Fame running back
- Val Joe Walker – professional football player
- Gene Wilson – professional football player
- Zach Wood – professional football player

==== Basketball ====
- Sterling Brown – professional basketball player
- Oscar Furlong – inducted into the FIBA Hall of Fame in 2007
- Rick Herrscher – professional basketball player
- Denny Holman – player in the ABA
- Feron Hunt – professional basketball player
- Jalen Jones (born 1993) – basketball player for Hapoel Haifa in the Israeli Basketball Premier League
- Jon Koncak – professional basketball player
- Jim Krebs – professional basketball player
- Shake Milton – professional basketball player
- Ben Moore (born 1995), basketball player in the Israeli Basketball Premier League
- Ike Ofoegbu (born 1984) – American-Nigerian Israeli Premier Basketball League player
- Semi Ojeleye – professional basketball player
- Quinton Ross – professional basketball player
- Jeryl Sasser – professional basketball player

==== Baseball ====
- Rick Herrscher – New York Mets
- Jack Knott – pitcher, Chicago White Sox

==== Golf ====
- Bryson DeChambeau (B.S. 2016) – professional golfer, winner of two major championships (2020 U.S. Open, 2024 U.S. Open), winner of the 2015 NCAA Individual Champion and 2015 U.S. Amateur Championship (one of only five golfers to win both titles in the same year)
- Colt Knost (B.B.A. 2007) – professional golfer; winner of the 2007 U.S. Amateur Championship and 2007 U.S. Amateur Public Links
- Kelly Kraft (B.B.A. 2011) – professional golfer
- Hank Kuehne (B.A. 1999) – professional golfer, winner of the 1998 U.S. Amateur Championship
- Payne Stewart (B.B.A. 1979) – professional golfer, winner of three major championships (1989 PGA Championship, 1991 U.S. Open, 1999 U.S. Open), member of World Golf Hall of Fame
- DeWitt Weaver – golf consultant and former professional golfer

==== Soccer ====
- Jordan Cano – professional soccer player
- Kenny Cooper – professional soccer player, American international five-time
- Byron Foss – professional soccer player, Colorado Rapids MLS Football
- Kevin Friedland (born 1981) – professional soccer player
- Luchi Gonzalez – professional soccer player, Hermann Trophy winner
- Daniel Hernández – Professional soccer player
- Ramón Núñez – professional soccer player, Honduran international
- Chase Wileman – professional soccer player

==== Swimming ====
- Corrie Clark – Pan Am silver medalist swimmer
- Rania Elwani – Egyptian Olympic swimmer
- Lars Frölander – Olympic gold medalist swimmer
- Jerry Heidenreich – Olympic gold medalist swimmer
- Steve Lundquist – Olympic gold medalist swimmer
- Martina Moravcová – Olympic silver medalist swimmer
- Ricardo Prado – Olympic silver medalist swimmer for Brazil
- Nina Rangelova – Bulgarian Olympic swimmer
- Richard Saeger – Olympic gold medalist swimmer

==== Track and field ====
- Kajsa Bergqvist – Olympic high jump bronze medalist for Sweden
- Roald Bradstock – Olympian javelin thrower for Great Britain and an artist nicknamed "Olympic Picasso"
- Libor Charfreitag – Olympic hammer thrower for Slovakia
- Sten Ekberg – Olympic decathlon athlete for Sweden
- Florence Ezeh – hammer thrower for France and Togo
- Teri Steer – Olympic shot putter
- Jason Tunks – Olympic discus thrower for Canada

==== Other athletics ====
- Jack Adkisson – professional wrestler better known as "Fritz Von Erich"
- Jim Duggan – professional wrestler
- Nastia Liukin – world gymnastics champion; Olympic gold medalist
- Robert Richardson – race car driver
- Isabella Tobias (2020) – American-born Olympic ice skater for Lithuania
- Mark Vines – former tennis player

== Notable faculty members ==
Current faculty

- Alejandro Aceves – mathematician, fellow of the American Association for the Advancement of Science
- Ravi Batra – best-selling economist; awarded medal of the Italian Senate by Italian prime minister for predicting the downfall of Soviet communism
- Caroline Brettell – cultural anthropologist and fellow of the American Academy of Arts and Sciences
- James Hollifield – political scientist, Ora Nixon Arnold Chair of International Political Economy and fellow of the Wilson Center
- Matthew Wilson – political scientist, fellow of the Tower Center for Public Policy and International Affairs

Former faculty

- Jeremy duQuesnay Adams – medieval historian and translator; author of Patterns of Medieval Society and The Populus of Augustine and Jerome
- Robert Theodore Anderson – organist, composer, and pedagogue
- Lev Aronson – cellist, Holocaust survivor
- Lewis Binford – archaeologist and fellow, National Academy of Sciences
- José Antonio Bowen – former dean of the SMU Meadows School of the Arts, President of Goucher College, and jazz musician
- Alessandra Comini – National Book Award finalist for Egon Schiele's Portraits; recipient of the Grand Decoration of Honour for Services to the Republic of Austria; curated exposition of Schiele's portraits for the Neue Galerie New York
- Jesse Lee Cuninggim – Methodist clergyman; served as head of the Department of Religious Education at SMU; received honorary degree from SMU
- Steven C. Currall – former provost of SMU, president of University of South Florida
- Craig Flournoy – Pulitzer Prize-winning journalist
- William Andrew Irwin – scholar of the Old Testament
- Geoffrey Orsak – former dean of the SMU Lyle School of Engineering, former president of the University of Tulsa
- Laurence Perrine – author of Sound and Sense
- György Sándor – pianist and writer
- Jeffrey W. Talley – former professor and chair of the Department of Civil and Environmental Engineering, the Bobby B. Lyle Professor of Leadership and Global Entrepreneurship and the Founding Director of the Hunter and Stephanie Hunt Institute for Engineering and Humanity, retired U.S. Army general, Global Fellow for the IBM Center for the Business of Government, former president and CEO of Environmental Technology Solutions (ETS Partners), in Phoenix, Arizona
- William Tsutsui – former dean of the SMU Dedman College, president of Hendrix College
- Paul van Katwijk – former dean of the SMU School of Music
- P. Gregory Warden – former university distinguished professor emeritus of art history and associate dean for research and academic affairs at the SMU Meadows School of the Arts, president of Franklin College Switzerland
- David J. Weber – fellow, American Academy of Arts and Sciences
- Fred Wendorf – archaeologist and fellow, National Academy of Sciences

== Chairpersons of the board of trustees ==
The board of governors served as an executive committee of the 75-member board of trustees. Because of the group's size, most of the real governing was done by the 21-member board of governors. In the aftermath of the 1987 football "death penalty" against SMU, the board of governors was eliminated and replaced with a smaller and more efficient board of trustees. The changes were also designed to increase the independence and authority of the university president. The new structure called for a board of trustees of 40 members and meeting four times a year instead of twice.

Chairpersons of the board of trustees

Name	Years
David B. Miller	2022–present
Robert H. Dedman Jr.	2018–2022
Michael M. Boone	2014–2018
Caren H. Prothro	2010–2014
Carl Sewell	2006–2010
Gerald J. Ford	2002–2006
Ruth Sharp Altshuler	2000–2002
William R. Howell	1996–2000
Robert H. Dedman Sr.	1992–1996
Ray Lee Hunt	1987–1992
Edwin L. Cox, Sr.	1976–1987

Chairpersons of the board of governors

Name	Years
William L. Hutchison	1986–1987
Bill Clements	1983–1986
Bill Clements	1967–1973
Eugene McElvaney	1952–1956

== Honorary degree recipients ==
Honorary degree recipient George H. W. Bush

- George H. W. Bush (Doctor of Humane Letters, 1992) – 41st president of the United States
- Gerald R. Ford (Doctor of Laws, 1975) – 38th president of the United States
- Juan Carlos I (Doctor of Arts, 2001) – king of Spain
- Jack Kilby (Doctor of Science) – Nobel Prize winner; inventor of the integrated circuit
- Bob Hope (Doctor of Humane Letters, 1967) – actor
- H. Ross Perot (Doctor of Humane Letters, 1991) – billionaire and former presidential candidate
- William McFerrin Stowe (Doctor of Laws, 1965) – bishop of the Methodist Church

== Other SMU affiliates (non-alumni) ==
- U.S. vice president Dick Cheney was a diplomat-in-residence at SMU's John Goodwin Tower Center for Political Studies in March 1996. Later that year, Cheney was named to the SMU board of trustees, resigning in August 2000 when he became the Republican candidate for U.S. vice president.
- General Colin Powell in 1997 received the first Medal of Freedom Award given by SMU's John Goodwin Tower Center for Political Studies at Dedman College of Humanities and Sciences.
- Former prime minister of the United Kingdom Margaret Thatcher in 1999 received the second Medal of Freedom Award, presented to her by Colin Powell, the recipient of the first medal.
- Senator and candidate for the Republican nomination for US president John McCain received the Tower Center's Medal of Freedom Award in 2005.
- Former British prime minister Tony Blair received the Medal of Freedom Award in 2008.

== SMU presidents ==
Name	Years
Robert Stewart Hyer	1911–1920
Hiram Abiff Boaz	1920–1922
Charles Claude Selecman	1923–1938
Umphrey Lee	1939–1954
Willis M. Tate	1954–1972
Paul Hardin	1972–1974
James Zumberge	1975–1980
L. Donald Shields	1980–1986
A. Kenneth Pye	1987–1994
R. Gerald Turner	1995–2025
Jay Hartzell	2025–present
