= Houstonian =

Houstonian may refer to:

- A native or resident of Houston
- Houstonian (train), a passenger train operated by the Missouri Pacific from Houston to New Orleans
- The Houstonian (newspaper), the newspaper of Sam Houston State University
- The official yearbook of the University of Houston
- The Houstonian Hotel, a luxury hotel in Houston
