= The Houstonian =

The Houstonian can refer to:

- The Houstonian Hotel
- The Houstonian (newspaper), the newspaper of Sam Houston State University
