= Fullinwider =

Fullinwider is a surname. Notable people with the surname include:

- Edwin Fullinwider (1900–1982), American fencer
- Jerry Fullinwider, American businessman
