= Cindy Ann Yeilding =

American geologist

- Born: May 23, 1960 (age 66)
- Education: Southern Methodist University; University of North Carolina
- Scientific career
- Fields: Geology Energy
- Workplaces: Denbury Inc. National Petroleum Council Study The centre for Houston's Future

Cindy A. Yeilding (born May 23, 1960) is an American geologist from Houston, Texas. Yeilding was previously Senior Vice President of British Petroleum, America. She was formerly Vice President of exploration technology and assurance, and has held various other positions at BP in oil and gas, exploration of the Gulf of Mexico and geoscience.

== Early life and education ==
Cindy Ann Yeilding was born on May 23, 1960. When she was a young child, her mother would take her to hunt for fossils and rocks. This promoted her love for geology. Yeilding was recognized for her mathematical talent during her high school years. At university, she initially pursued a math degree, although her true passions were art history and architecture. Eventually, she switched to a geology major, which she saw as "the perfect melding of art and science". She earned a bachelor's degree in Geology and Earth Sciences from Southern Methodist University in Dallas, Texas, as well as a master's degree of science in geology from the University of North Carolina.

== Career ==
Yeilding initially joined Standard Oil of Ohio (Sohio), an American oil company, as a summer intern. In 1985, after she completed her master's degree in geology, the company hired her as an exploration geologist and a carbonate specialist. During this period, Yeilding also contributed to academia: she delivered short lectures to institutions such as American Association of Petroleum, assisted in developing courses, and published papers on geology. Yeilding has delivered presentations to various esteemed societies as well. Shortly after this she became an operations geologist and oversaw off shore-geologic activities. In 1987, Sohio was bought by British Petroleum (BP). Throughout her life, she has published over 100 articles on geoscience, CCUS, and energy transition.

Yeilding's experience working offshore led her to working in various basins globally. Most notably, she was an influential figure in the exploration and appraisal of the Gulf of Mexico which led to her becoming Chief Geoscientist. Later, she held the position of Research and Development Manager and worked her way up to overall Vice President for BP. During her time at BP, Yeilding lead several exploration teams around the world, primarily in Venezuela and the Gulf of Mexico. Her work during the deepwater explorations in the Gulf of Mexico eventually lead to the development of BP's subsidiary, BPX&P. She held the positions of Director, Vice President, and Executive Board Committee member at BPX&P. She was formerly Vice President of exploration technology and assurance, and has held various other positions at BP in oil and gas, and geoscience.

In 2020, Yeilding was the chairperson for a study on capturing, using, and storing carbon performed by the National Petroleum Council.

Yeilding was previously a part of the Offshore Technology Conference (OTC) Board of Directors, though she is no longer a contemporary member.

== Recognition ==
Yeilding has received several awards and honours in recognition of her work. The American Association of Petroleum Geologists (AAPG) named her a Distinguished Lecturer and a "Legend of Exploration" in 2003. She appeared in the Houston Business Journal's "2016 Women in Energy Leadership", Houston's Top 15 Business Women, and Houston's 50 Most influential Women of 2016. In 2017, she was granted the Manufacturing Institutes STEP Award for women. STEP stands for science, technology, engineering, and production. She has also won Hart Energy's "25 Most Influential Women in Energy" award in 2020. Additionally, Hart Energy, an American publishing company, welcomed Yeilding into their Hall of Fame series that recognizes people with extensive influence on the energy sector.

== Conflicts between Industries ==
Yeilding has stated that she faced difficulties as a geologist working in engineering industries. In the early stages of her career, male engineers working on oil rigs would disregard Yeilding and assume she did not understand drilling, because she was a geologist and not an oil rig engineer. Despite this, she persevered and honed relationships with the crew that allowed them to realize how valuable she was to the team, as well as the showing the engineers the capability of professions to intersect. Yeilding learned a lot of lessons while being in the petroleum industry, one being that "it isn't race or gender that defines us: it is our brains". She stated that by using the "Bigger Brain", the amalgamation of everyone's experiences, insights, and knowledge, we can solve complex issues and make the most of our circumstances.

== Women in STEM outreach ==
Yeilding is a founder of the American Association of Petroleum Geologists Women's Committee. She launched the OTC Women's networking committee and the High School Energy Challenge. Both initiatives are not for profit.

Yeilding is on the leadership council for BP's Million Women Mentors and is an executive sponsor for BP Women's Network. She contributes to BP's programs to support young women aspiring to enter careers in STEM. The company conducts high school outreach programs that bring science and engineering students to shadow Yeilding and her colleagues. They also provide mentorship for university level women. BP sponsors “take your child to work day” for elementary and high school students to learn from top scientists and engineers who work at BP.

== Selected publications ==
Yeilding has published numerous research works.

- Structural Controls on Tertiary Deep Water Deposition in the Northern Gulf of Mexico: A study that analyzes how the seabed topographies of the northern Gulf of Mexico are created, the factors involved in its creation and the role of the regional and local structural setting as well as the area's previous tectonic and deposition history.
- Spatial and Temporal Variations in the Facies Associations of Depositional Sequences on the Slope: Examples from the Miocene-Pleistocene of the Gulf of Mexico: The study of the deep water deposition systems of northern Gulf of Mexico which demonstrates that the building blocks that make up the deep water depositional sequences combine in a variable assemblage of facies. These depositional sequences are also predictive since they assemble in an upward succession of high energy to low energy deposits.
- Shelf Margin Processes And Their Impact On Sediment Architecture Of The Plio-Pleistocene, U.S. Gulf of Mexico: An article which aims to describe how the shelf margins in the Plio-Pleistocene of the U.S. Gulf of Mexico varies, with the study of the depositional sequences of these shelf margins as well as how vertical and lateral facies are associated with them. This articles also lays out the ways in which slope deposition can be predicted through the analyzation of the structure of the shelf margins, as well as the relationship between these shelf margin architectures and sea level changes.
- Facies in a shelf-edge delta - An example from the subsurface of the Gulf of Mexico, middle Pliocene, Mississippi Canyon, Block 109: A study of shelf-edge delta systems in the middle Pliocene, Mississippi Canyon, Block 109, which includes analyzation into the characteristics such as vertically stacked shelf-edge delta systems, extensive upper delta-slope deformation, turbidities in the upper slope, gravity and tractional deposits, mouth-bar deposits, and the lack of delta-plain facies.
- Sedimentary response to Mississippian tectonic activity at the east end of the 38th Parallel fracture zone: A study of the Mississippian east end of the 38th Parallel fracture zone that describes how the east–west uplift is established, as well as records the timing of Paleozoic tectonic movement.
- Is the workstation "killing" geology?: An article in the Houston Geological Society Bulletin, in which Yeilding describes how advanced technology has aided the geological interpretations and analyzations, while also raising points on how heavy reliance of the geo-scientists on the tools and aids of technology also leads to diminished critical analyzing and thinking.
- Effects of Mississippian Tectonic Movement on Sedimentation and Diagenesis of Greenbrier Group in Eastern Appalachian Plateau: Analysis of the effects of tectonic movements in Mississippi on the sedimentation in the Eastern Appalachian Plateau. This study describes the characteristics of the sediment layers and lays out how the layers were formed.
- Reservoir Prediction Using the Forest and the Trees: Reducing Reservoir Risk and Uncertainty in Deepwater Gulf of Mexico Exploration by Using a Wide Range and Scale of Predictive Tools: This article from the Houston Geological Society Bulletin discusses the analysis of the depositional and petroleum systems framework on which the exploration of the Gulf of Mexico is focused.
- Discovery of the Thunder Horse July 1999: Cindy Ann Yeilding was a part of a research team that discovered one of the largest deep water oil fields in BP history named the Thunder Horse. The expedition team undercovered reservoirs in Miocene Turbidite sandstones with two adjacent fields developing at the same time. The Thunder Horse's contribution to the energy was massive as its facilities house roughly 1.8 million barrels of oil which supplies resources to refineries in both the United States and other Midwest countries.
- Stratigraphic Architecture of an Extensional Orogen: Assisted with the analyzing and study of the Miocene Extensional Belt. This field-based study resulted in new discoveries in stratigraphic architecture, as well as further understanding of the extensional orogen belt located in South California. Field-based studies and quantitative models provide new insights into the stratigraphic architecture of a developing continental extensional orogen. The early Miocene age Mojave Extensional Belt of southern California (MEB) exhibits a tripartite stratigraphy, consisting of (1) pre- to early synextension volcanic deposits, unconformably overlain by (2) syntectonic basement-derived megabreccia and breccia with local finer-grained units, overlain by (3) a post-tectonic fining-upward sequence of gravel, sand, shale, and limestone. On a more local scale, stratigraphy and sediment dispersal within the MEB reflect the evolution of the major tectonic elements of the belt: (1) Breakaway zone.
- Deepwater Sedimentary Systems: Science, Discovery, and Applications: Yeilding was a primary editor of this book, published in 2022.

== Personal life ==
Yeilding is married and has two children. Sources occasionally misspell her surname as "Yielding".
