= Waleed A. Samkari =

Waleed Ahmad Samkari
- Born: 1942; Irbid, Jordan
- Died: July 15, 2019 (aged 76–77)
- Military career
- Branch: Jordanian Army (Maintenance corps)
- Service years: 1972–1996
- Rank: Brigadier general
- Commands: Commander of royal maintenance corps.
- Awards: Independence medal (1976), Supreme Order of the Renaissance (1992), Order of the Star of Jordan (1994)

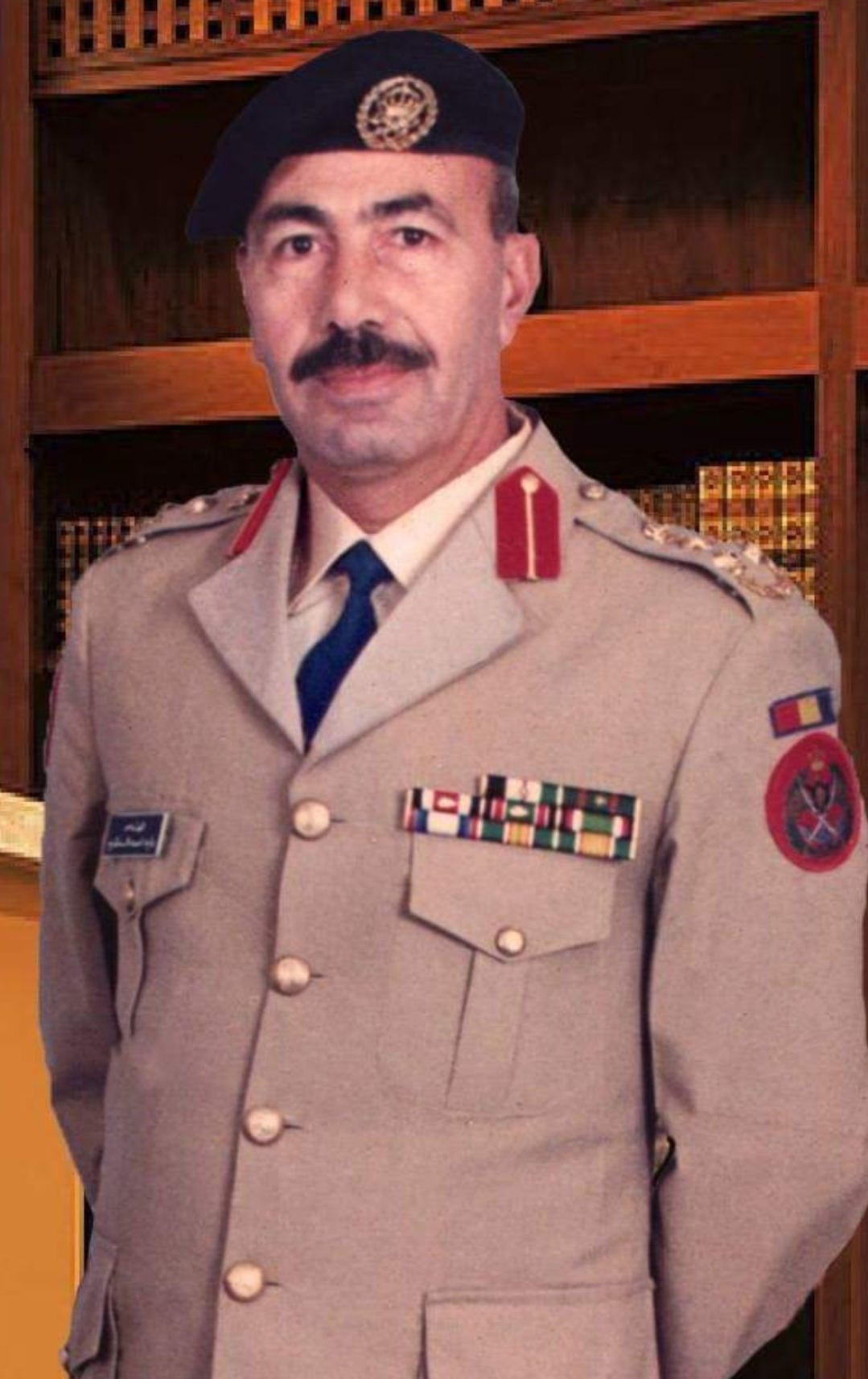
General Waleed Samkari 1995.

Brigadier General Waleed Ahmad Samkari (العميد وليد أحمد السمكري) was director of the Royal Maintenance Corps (سلاح الصيانة الملكي) of the Jordanian Armed Forces responsible for supporting continuous operations for the military. During his command, his unit underwent a change in adopting modern military organization. Samkari helped with getting the ZSU-23-4 "Shilka" and the 9K33 Osa from Russia and the former Soviet Union. He influenced improving military collaboration between Jordan and Turkey. He had been educated in Turkey and was fluent in the language.

== Early life ==
Samkari was born in Irbid in 1942. He was educated there and finished high school when he was 16. He then enrolled in Engineering School in Istanbul, Turkey in 1959 where he met his future wife Enji Kanarya. His brothers were a major influence on him joining the Army as all three had served in the military; his oldest brother Yassin had served in the 1950s as a major in the cavalry. His brother Izzat had been a brigadier general and director of the Jordanian Royal Medical Services. His younger brother Sameer had joined a few years earlier and was a captain for the Royal Jordanian Air Force, before his death in a fighter jet crash while training in the United States in 1967

== Education ==
Samkari attended Istanbul Technical University (1959–1965), where he received his undergraduate and graduate degrees in mechanical engineering. He then worked on an irrigation project north of Jordan, where he witnessed an aerial battle between Israeli and Syrian fighter jets in the Six-Day War in 1967. He resolved at that time to one day join the military. He moved to work in Kuwait for a few years.

U.S Army General William G.T. Tuttle, Jr. congratulates Smakari

After he joined the army in 1972, the military sent Samkari for several educational courses in England and the United States, including Fort Lee (Virginia) in 1988, where he received his second master's degree from the Florida Institute of Technology. He had several courses in Fort Lee. and he was engaged in military cooperation with the United States.

== Military career ==
Samkari entered the service in 1972. He started working in the Maintenance Corps warehouses that were responsible for supplying the military with spare parts. He was sent to the United States in order to get training in leadership and management.

Samkari with King Hussein

After Major General Abdilwahab Kharabsheh retired as maintenance corps commander, King Hussein promoted Samkari to brigadier general and commander of the corps in 1992. Samkari's role as director came at a sensitive time. After the Gulf War, the face of the middle east had changed. Samkari reused parts and reassembled them, due to the shortage of spare parts. That changed by the time of the start of the peace talks between Jordan and Israel. By that time Jordan had started an era of sophisticated military force.

== Role in military improvement ==
General Samkari was a member of the envoy to the Soviet Union which acquired Russian made anti aircraft weaponry, the ZSU-23-4 "Shilka" and the 9K33 Osa missiles and targeting radar. He also was sent to the United Kingdom to gain support for various British built weaponry in Jordan. Samkari was also sent to the United States several times in order to take courses to improve the Jordanian military in Fort Lee (Virginia).

== Awards and orders of knighthood ==
- Order of the Star of Jordan 1994
- Supreme Order of the Renaissance the second knighthood order of the Kingdom of Jordan. 1992
- Order of Independence (Jordan) the fourth knighthood order of the Kingdom of Jordan. 1976

== Death ==
General Samkari died in the King Hussein Medical Center on July 15, 2019, after having been hospitalized two days prior. He was buried on July 16, 2019, beside his wife with military honors

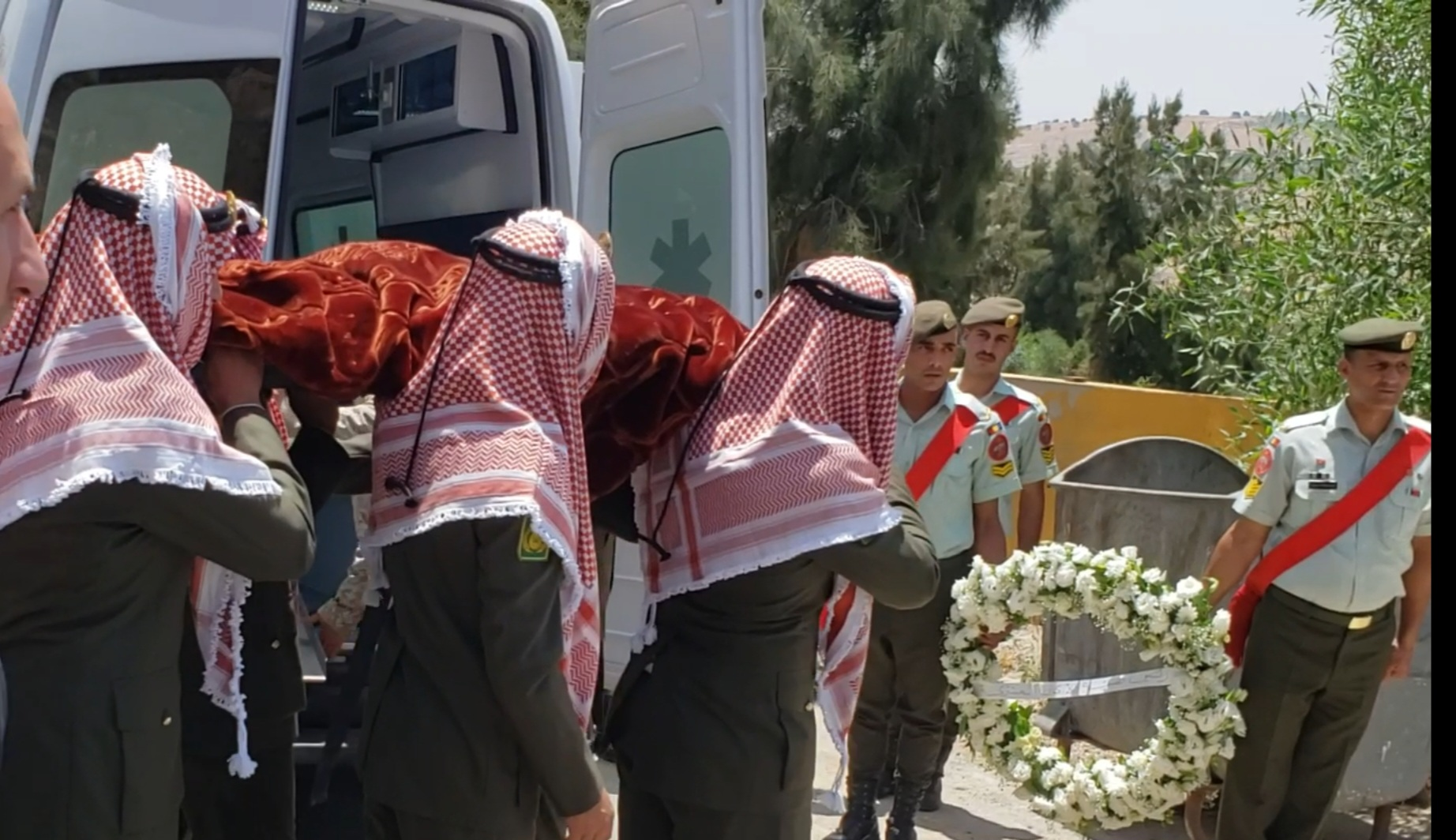
Military funeral of Waleed a samkari
