= Michelle Lemmons-Poscente =

American CEO and entrepreneur

- Born: Michelle Lemmons; San Angelo, Texas, United States
- Occupation(s): CEO, entrepreneur
- Spouse: Vince Poscente
- Website: International Speakers Bureau

Michelle Lemmons-Poscente is an American CEO and entrepreneur. Michelle Lemmons-Poscente is the Chairman of ISB Global, LLC, a diversified leadership and educational services firm. She is also founder and CEO of International Speakers Bureau, a full-service speaker's agency specializing in business, contemporary thought leadership, and entertainment headquartered in Dallas, Texas.

== Early life and career ==
Born in San Angelo, Texas, Michelle Lemmons attended Southern Methodist University majoring in communications. Lemmons relocated to Hollywood where she quickly found work in the film and television industry on programs such as Lifestyles of the Rich and Famous, Star Search and Supermodels of the World.

Lemmons was forced to move back to San Angelo in the early 1990s to help care for her ailing father. While trying to earn money and still stay at home for her father. Lemmons unexpectedly founded International Speakers Bureau in 1993 after booking the late Charles Kuralt.

Following the death of her father, Lemmons moved to Dallas where she rented office space and began to hire staff. Lemmon's entrepreneurial spirit and early adoption of the internet lead to rapid growth for the company.

In 1995, she met Canadian Olympic star Vincent Poscente at a speakers conference and married him a short time later.

In 1997, the company was recognized as one of the Top Female Run Businesses in Texas and also partnered with Yahoo! to create Mentorium. Mentorium was an early attempt at interactive online learning. In 2000, the company won the Sprint #1 Small Business in America award and was recognized by Bank One as one of the Top Female Owned Businesses in the United States. The company continued its growth and moved to historic Elm Place in 2007.

International Speakers Bureau, Inc. filed Bankruptcy in 2013 (see case #3:13-bk-34623) in the state of Texas. In the bankruptcy filing, many speakers with whom ISB had booked engagements were listed as still being owed monies as well as CEO Michelle Lemmons having listed herself as a creditor.

In 2006, Lemmons-Poscente was featured on ABC's, "American Inventor", as the Presentation Coach for the top 12 contestants.

Lemmons-Poscente has held numerous international board positions including Vice Presidents of Education for Young Entrepreneurs' Organization (YEO) as well as seats on International Association of Speakers Bureaus, Young Presidents' Organization (YPO) TACA Board – a Dallas arts fund-raising organization, The SMU Doak Walker Sports Lecture Series, and Meeting Planners International (MPI) as a Charter member.

Michelle Lemmons-Poscente lives in Dallas, Texas with her husband Vincent Poscente and is the mother of three children. The family live in the house musician Steve Miller grew up in.
