= Shreveport Journal =

American newspaper

The Shreveport Journal was an American newspaper originally published by H. P. Benton in Shreveport and Bossier City in northwestern Louisiana. In operation from at least 1897, it ceased publication in 1991.

== History ==
The name The Journal was adopted on February 17, 1897. Previously the publication had been known for several years as The Judge. William E. Hamilton, another of several early owners, obtained the newspaper about 1900 and held it until 1911, when it was acquired by the Journal Publishing Company, with A. J. Frantz as the president and Douglas F. Attaway Sr. as secretary. By 1918, Attaway had acquired controlling interest; in 1925, he became the president and publisher. Upon the senior Attaway's death in 1957, his son, Douglas F. Attaway Jr., succeeded his father as both the president and publisher. Attaway graduated with a journalism degree from the University of Missouri in Columbia. From 1966 to 1979, he was also the chairman of the board of KSLA-TV, the CBS affiliate established in 1954 and the first television outlet in Shreveport. Attaway sold KSLA to Viacom. He was also a former chairman of the board of Newspaper Production Company and the Attaway Newspaper Group, Inc.

In 1972, Attaway wrote an article on a total eclipse, the phenomenon in which the moon totally blocks the rays of the sun, which occurred on July 10 of that year. Attaway and his long-term photo editor, Jack Barham, journeyed to New York City to observe the two-minute eclipse, having found their desirable spot of view under the Verrazzano–Narrows Bridge.

In 1974, Attaway recruited Stanley R. Tiner from the rival Shreveport Times to become the editor of The Journal. A Webster Parish native reared in Shreveport, Tiner graduated with a journalism degree from Louisiana Tech University. In 1976, Attaway sold The Journal to the Shreveport industrialist and philanthropist Charles T. Beaird, who had served in the late 1950s as a Republican for one term on the former Caddo Parish Police Jury. Tiner and Beaird moved the editorial position of The Journal to the political left, whereas it had been clearly conservative and earlier segregationist under Attaway and a previous editor, George Shannon.

The Times and The Journal once shared a building at 222 Lake Street, although they were separately owned and editorially independent. The Times remains at the Lake Street location, but has moved operations to an adjacent building in recent years.

=== Closure in 1991 ===
On January 29, 1991, Beaird announced that The Journal would terminate its daily operations two months later on March 30. The publication had steadily lost circulation and hence critical advertising revenues during the preceding decade. Readership dropped from a peak of nearly 40,000 to barely 16,000. "There just comes a time when it becomes uneconomical to go on. It was a very tough, sad decision," Beaird said.

Though The Journal had closed as a daily paper in 1991, Beaird contracted an agreement with The Times to carry on its op-ed page called "Journal Page", which permitted continuing editorial comment approved by Beaird and managed by his editor, Jim Montgomery (1945–2013), also a native of Webster Parish. The "Journal Page" finally ended its run on December 31, 1999.

Under Beaird, The Journal won several important prizes, including the Robert F. Kennedy Award for Coverage of the Disadvantaged by the National Conference of Christians and Jews, the Mass Media Gold Medallion for stories on African American history, and the Scripps-Howard National Journalism Awards for Editorial Writing. "Journal Page" was a finalist in 1994 for a Pulitzer Prize in Editorial Writing for a series on decriminalization of narcotics. Years later in 2006, Stanley Tiner's staff at The Sun Herald in Biloxi-Gulfport, Mississippi, won a Pulitzer Prize for Public Service for its reporting of Hurricane Katrina the previous year.

== Notable people ==
In addition to the aforementioned George Shannon, Stanley Tiner, and Jack Barham, other notable Journal staffers include:

- Craig Flournoy, reporter in the 1970s, later won a Pulitzer Prize at The Dallas Morning News; currently a journalism professor at the University of Cincinnati
- Bill Keith, former city editor, later Shreveport Times investigative reporter, and member of the Louisiana State Senate
- Robert Mann, reporter (early 1980s); currently holds the Douglas Manship Chair of Journalism at LSU in Baton Rouge; inductee of the Louisiana Political Museum and Hall of Fame
- Rupert Peyton, city editor of The Journal from 1925 to 1940; former member of the Louisiana House of Representatives; strongly anti-Long politician
