= The Huntsville Item =

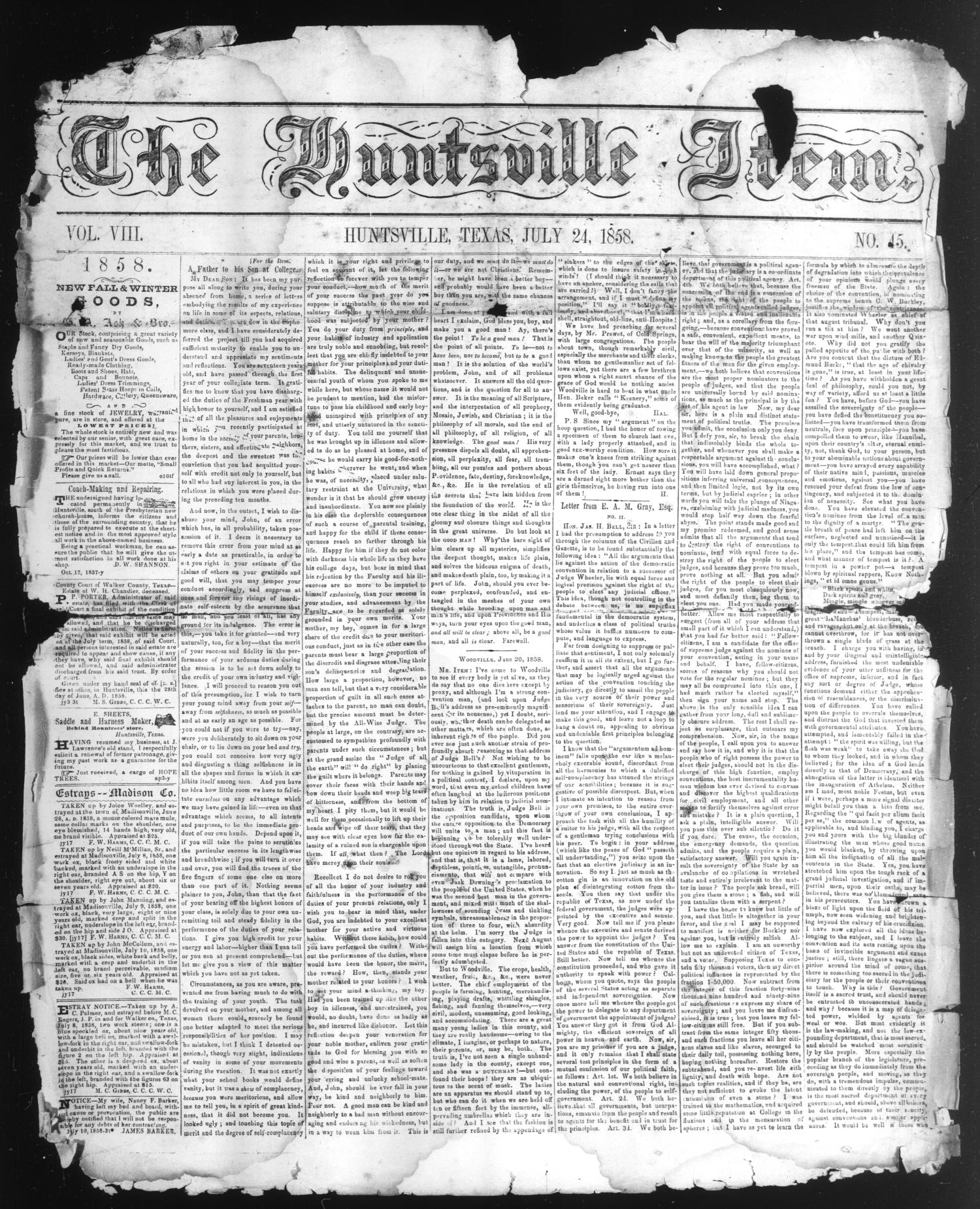
- The Huntsville Item. (Huntsville, Tex.), Vol. 8, No. 45, Ed. 1 Saturday, July 24, 1858
- Type: Daily newspaper
- Format: Broadsheet
- Owner: Community Newspaper Holdings Inc.
- Founder: George Robinson
- Publisher: Traci Gallin
- Editor: Lisa Beth Trow
- Founded: 1850
- Headquarters: 1409 Tenth Street; Huntsville, Texas 77342; United States
- Circulation: 1,313 (as of 2023)
- ISSN: 0888-4145
- Website: itemonline.com

The Huntsville Item is a five-day morning daily newspaper published in Huntsville, Texas, covering Walker County in East Texas. It is owned by Community Newspaper Holdings Inc.

The Item's presses also print two college newspapers, The Battalion of Texas A&M University, and The Houstonian of Sam Houston State University.

Being located in Huntsville, the location of Texas' execution chamber, The Item is one of two news organizations that (by order of the Texas Department of Criminal Justice) has a reserved spot to report on executions held in Texas (the Associated Press is the other). The Huntsville Item is the only newspaper that reports on all executions in Texas regardless of the county of conviction.

== History ==
Founded in 1850 by George Robinson (1820–1888), The Item reportedly is the second oldest continuously published newspaper in Texas. It has been headquartered across from the old Huntsville post office, on the banks of Town Creek, since the late 1960s.

The Woodall family sold the paper to Harte Hanks in the 1960s. Harte Hanks sold the paper to Media News Group in the early 1980s, which sold it to The Thomson Corporation in the late 1980s. The Thomson Corporation sold The Huntsville Item, along with 11 other papers, to the American Publishing Company (later Hollinger International) in 1995. Hollinger sold off most of its small papers in 1999, and The Huntsville Item went to Community Newspaper Holdings.
