= Craig Flournoy =

American journalist (born 1951)

John Craig Flournoy
- Born: June 26, 1951 (age 75); Shreveport, Louisiana, USA
- Education: University of New Orleans; Southern Methodist University; Louisiana State University
- Occupations: Journalist with: Shreveport Journal; The Dallas Morning News; Professor at: Sam Houston State University; University of Cincinnati; Southern Methodist University
- Spouse: Nina Flournoy
- Children: 3

John Craig Flournoy (born June 26, 1951 in Shreveport, Louisiana, USA) is a journalism professor at the University of Cincinnati and a former investigative reporter for The Dallas Morning News, at which his work included coverage of the latter portion of the civil rights movement.

He has taught since 2014 at Cincinnati. From 2003 to 2013, he taught at Southern Methodist University, where in 1986, he received a Master of Arts degree in history. He formerly taught courses on computer-assisted reporting, investigative reporting, history of American journalism, and communication law briefly at the University of Cincinnati. From 1997 to 1998, while on leave from The Dallas Morning News, he was the Phillip G. Warner Professor of Journalism at Sam Houston State University in Huntsville, Texas.

== Education ==
Flournoy obtained his Bachelor of Arts in history with honors from the University of New Orleans in 1975, his master's in history from SMU in 1986, and his Ph.D. in journalism in 2003 from the Douglas Manship School of Mass Communications at Louisiana State University in Baton Rouge.

== Awards and honors ==
Flournoy has won more than fifty state and national journalism awards, including the Scripps Howard Edward J. Meeman Award for Environmental Reporting and eleven Dallas Club Katie awards, five of which were for investigative reporting.

He also won a 1986 Pulitzer Prize with George Rodrigue in National Reporting for The Dallas Morning News(shared with Arthur Howe of The Philadelphia Inquirer) for their investigation into subsidized housing in East Texas, which uncovered patterns of racial discrimination and segregation in public housing across the United States and led to significant reforms.

== Family ==
Flournoy and his wife, Nina P. Flournoy, have three daughters. Mrs. Flournoy is a senior lecturer at Southern Methodist University.

== See also ==
- The Houstonian (newspaper)
