= Royal Maintenance Corps (Jordan) =

Jordanian Armed Forces القوّات المسلّحة الاردنيّة
- Founded: October 1920
- Current form: March 1956
- Service branches: Royal Jordanian Land Force; Royal Naval Force; Royal Jordanian Air Force; Royal Special Forces; His Majesty's Special Security; Royal Maintenance Corps; General Intelligence Department; Public Security Directorate; Jordan Design and Development Bureau

Leadership
- Commander: King Abdullah II

Related articles
- History: Desert Force; Arab Legion; Transjordan Frontier Force
- Ranks: Jordanian military ranks

The Royal Maintenance Corps "silah al siyana al-malaki" (سلاح الصيانة الملكي) is a branch of the Jordanian Armed Forces. It must furnish continuous operation to the field and is responsible for flow of parts, and for every vehicle being operational and ready for battle. The corps' engineers are also responsible for upgrading the tanks in use.

== Role in improving the Jordanian military ==
The maintenance corps role in improving Jordanian ground units, is to apply enhanced targeting systems on the M60 Patton, the full reconstruction of several other vehicles such as the Centurion tank and to upgrade the 274 Chieftain tank in a redesign called Khalid ibn al-Walid. The Jordanian engineers were able to revolutionise the Challenger 1 turret system with an auto loader and a 120 mm smooth-bore gun. Maintenance specialists were sent to the United States and Britain for advanced training.

== History ==
In 1972, the Chieftain Tank needed enhancement in order to meet changing military needs. The Corps Commander, Major General Kharabsheh, installed the new laser targeting system on several tanks including the M60. This move was revolutionary for the Jordanian military. It made it possible for the cavalry to balance power with its neighbors.

== Commanders ==
The king of Jordan selected the commanders of the corps. A list follows:

1. Brigadier General Engineer Nael AL-Ragad 2009–present
2. Major General Abdilwahab Kharabsheh ? - 1992
3. Major General Mosleh AlMuthanna AlYamani 1988-1992
4. Brigadier General Waleed a. Samkari 1992 - ?
5. Major General Engineer Fadel Mohammed Ali 2000 - 2001
