= Thomas F. Siems =

American economist

Thomas F. Siems is senior economist and policy advisor at the Federal Reserve Bank of Dallas. He holds a master's degree and PhD from Southern Methodist University in Dallas, Texas, where he also lectures.

== Biography ==
Siems earned a B.S. (engineering) in industrial and operations engineering from the University of Michigan in 1982 and an M.S. and Ph.D. in operations research from Southern Methodist University in 1985 and 1991, respectively. In addition, Siems is a 1989 graduate of the Public Finance Institute at the University of Michigan and a 1991 alumnus of the Graduate School of Banking at Colorado. Siems began his career with the Federal Reserve in 1984.

Siems currently conducts economic and financial research to develop a comprehensive understanding of globalization, including how new ideas (technologies and policies) impact productivity and economic growth. He is also a senior lecturer in the Engineering Management, Information and Systems Department in the School of Engineering at Southern Methodist University and an advisory board member of the Cato Institute's Project on Social Security Choice.

Siems is active in the Bank's economic education programs and has taught economics, statistics, finance, operations management and other engineering and business courses at SMU, LeTourneau University and the University of Dallas.

== Publications ==
Siems has published more than 50 articles, some of which have appeared in such journals as Journal of Money, Credit and Banking, European Journal of Political Economy, Research in Finance, Business Economics, Review of Financial Economics, Annals of Operations Research, and various Federal Reserve Bank of Dallas publications. He is the only two-time winner of NABE's Edmund A. Mennis Contributed Paper Award, having won the award in 2006 for his co-authored paper, “Strengthening Globalization’s Invisible Hand: What Matters Most?” and in 2005 for his paper, "Who Supplied My Cheese? Supply Chain Management in the Global Economy".

Siems authored a paper published by Cato Institute in September 1997 entitled “10 Myths About Financial Derivatives”.
