= USS Jack Miller =

U.S destroyer acquired during World War II

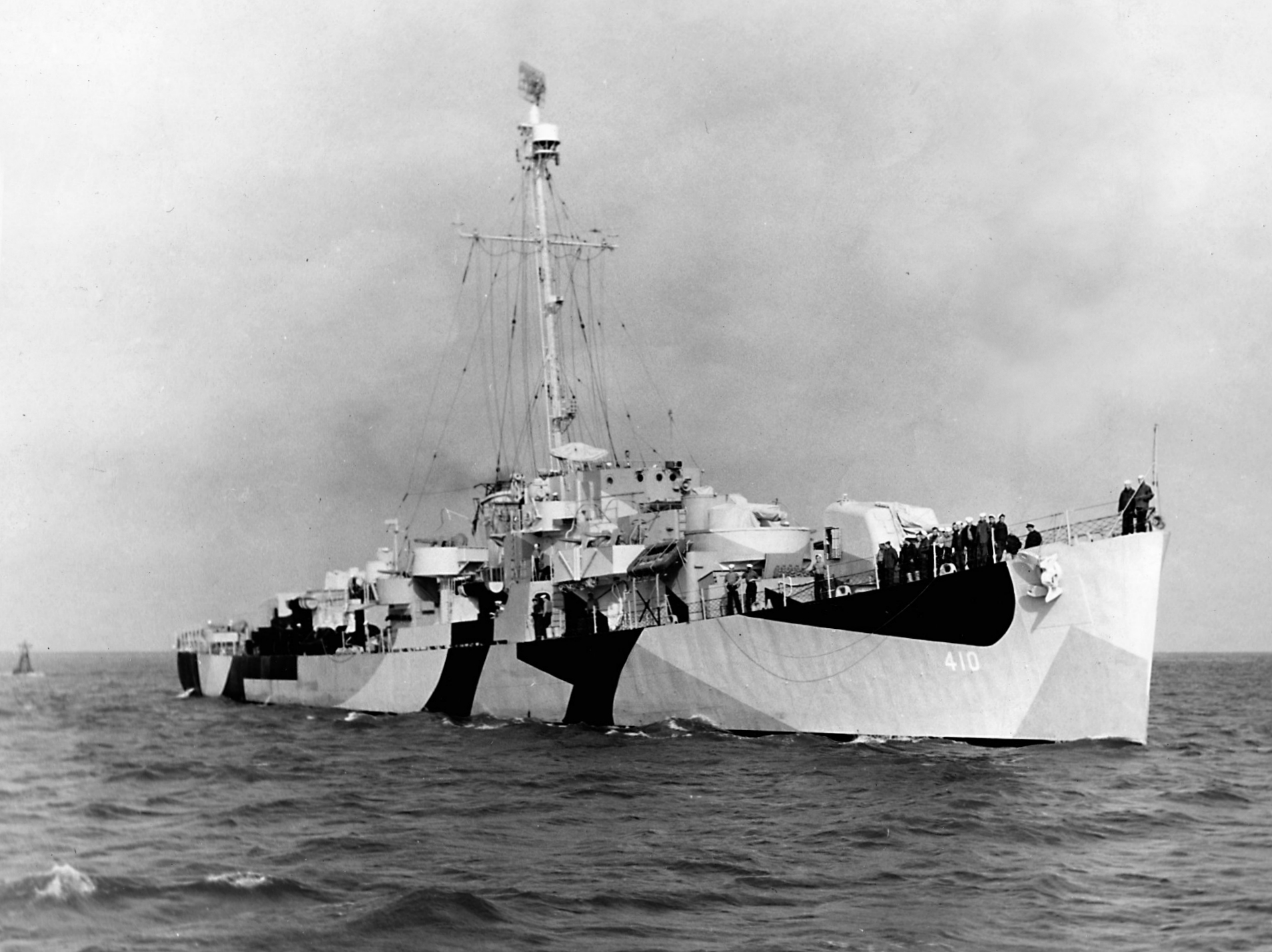
- Jack Miller underway c. 1944

History

United States
- Name: Jack Miller
- Namesake: Jack Miller
- Builder: Brown Shipbuilding, Houston, Texas
- Laid down: 29 November 1943
- Launched: 10 January 1944
- Commissioned: 13 April 1944
- Decommissioned: 1 June 1946
- Stricken: 30 June 1968
- Fate: Sold for scrapping July 1969

General characteristics
- Class & type: John C. Butler-class destroyer escort
- Displacement: 1,350 long tons (1,372 t)
- Length: 306 ft (93 m)
- Beam: 36 ft 8 in (11.18 m)
- Draft: 9 ft 5 in (2.87 m)
- Propulsion: 2 boilers, 2 geared turbine engines, 12,000 shp (8,900 kW); 2 propellers
- Speed: 24 knots (44 km/h)
- Range: 6,000 nautical miles (11,000 km) at 12 knots (22 km/h)
- Complement: 14 officers, 201 enlisted
- Armament: 2 × single 5 in (127 mm) guns; 2 × twin 40 mm (1.6 in) AA guns; 10 × single 20 mm (0.79 in) AA guns; 1 × triple 21 in (533 mm) torpedo tubes; 8 × depth charge throwers; 1 × Hedgehog ASW mortar; 2 × depth charge racks

USS Jack Miller (DE-410) was a John C. Butler-class destroyer escort acquired by the U.S. Navy during World War II. The primary purpose of the destroyer escort was to escort and protect ships in convoy, in addition to other tasks as assigned, such as patrol or radar picket. Post-war, she returned home with two battle stars to her credit.

The destroyer escort was named in honor of First lieutenant Jack Miller, who was awarded the Navy Cross for his brave actions during the Guadalcanal campaign. The ship was launched on 10 January 1944, by Brown Shipbuilding Co., at their yard in Houston, Texas, sponsored by Mrs. Henry S. Miller, mother of Lt. Miller, and commissioned on 13 April 1944.

== Namesake ==
Jack Miller was born on 2 April 1920 in Dallas, Texas. He earned a Bachelor's degree in Commerce from Southern Methodist University (SMU) in 1941. Three weeks before graduation, Miller signed up to join the United States Marine Corps and reported for duty three weeks after graduation. Miller served in the Marine Corps Reserve as a Second lieutenant from 19 May to 31 October 1941. Commissioned First lieutenant, USMC, at Quantico, Virginia, 1 November 1941, he volunteered for "Carlson's Raiders" and went to the Pacific Theatre.

On 3 December 1942, as commanding officer of a platoon during the Guadalcanal Campaign, he led a flank attack on a strong enemy combat patrol engaged by his battalion at the summit of the hill. Realizing the advance of his platoon was being held up by hostile machine gun fire, he led the assault on the Japanese gun position, receiving wounds from which he died the following day. He was buried beside the road on Guadalcanal. Miller was posthumously awarded the Navy Cross.

== History ==
=== World War II ===
After shakedown along the U.S. East Coast and in the Gulf of Mexico, Jack Miller sailed from Norfolk, Virginia, 13 June 1944, arriving Pearl Harbor 12 July via the Panama Canal Zone and San Diego, California. After more intensive training out of Pearl Harbor, she departed on 24 July screening a convoy to Eniwetok, where she arrived on 2 August. The remainder of the month was spent on patrol and convoy duty. Jack Miller sailed from Eniwetok on 2 September and, after escorting a convoy to Saipan, took up harbor patrol duty there. Antisubmarine patrols, convoy screening, and escort duty kept Jack Miller busy for the next nine months. During this period she sank five mines. In late 1944 Jack Miller came under the command of Lt. Commander Vermont C. Royster; who had been the White House correspondent of The Wall Street Journal before the war. After the war ended, he left the Navy and resumed his journalism career at the Wall Street Journal; he would eventually become the paper's editor-in-chief in 1958.

In June and July, Jack Miller screened fueling groups in support of the Okinawa operation. After the war, she operated out of Japan before returning to San Diego 5 November 1945.

=== Decommissioning ===
Jack Miller remained at San Diego until decommissioning there 1 June 1946, and joining the Stockton Group, Pacific Reserve Fleet. On 30 June 1968 she was struck from the Navy list, and, in July 1969, she was sold for scrapping.

== Awards ==
Jack Miller received two battle stars for World War II service.
