= John-Henry Crawford =

American classical cellist

John-Henry Crawford (born on January 21, 1993 in Shreveport, Louisiana) is an American classical cellist.

== Career ==
He began his studies at the age of 5 at the Centenary Suzuki School, founded by his mother, Laura Popper Crawford. As a teenager, he studied cello with Andres Diaz at Southern Methodist University in Dallas, while attending Caddo Magnet for his first two years of high school. When he was accepted into the Curtis Institute of Music at age 15, he simultaneously finished high school at the City Center Academy in downtown Philadelphia. Following his studies at Curtis with Peter Wiley and Carter Brey, Crawford continued his studies in Chicago with Hans Jørgen Jensen after which Crawford earned his master’s degree from The Juilliard School where he studied with Joel Krosnick. Soon after, he studied with Philippe Muller at the Manhattan School of Music, from which he holds an Artist Diploma.

In 2021, Crawford released his debut album, Dialogo, on Orchid Classics with pianist Victor Santiago Asuncion. Notably, Dialogo ranked #7 on Billboard’s Classical Top 10 chart after its release. His second album released in 2022, Corazón: The Music of Latin America, was named Editor’s Choice in Gramophone Magazine and reached #5 on Billboard’s Classical Top 10. The following year, he released his third album, Voice of Rachmaninoff, to celebrate the 150th anniversary of Rachmaninoff’s birth, which also placed in the Top Ten on Billboard’s Classical Chart. In collaboration with the San Francisco Ballet Orchestra led by Music Director and Principal Conductor Martin West, he released his fourth album on Orchid Classics in 2024 titled, Dvořák & Tchaikovsky. All four of Crawford’s albums were produced by Grammy-winning producer Adam Abeshouse.

Crawford has performed throughout the United States and in various countries across the world. He has performed in Paris in the Louvre Museum’s international concert series, as well as performances with the Mid-Texas Symphony, Memphis Symphony, Shreveport Symphony and Highland Park Strings. In Chicago, Crawford appeared on WFMT's Impromptu series and he has toured extensively with Victor Santiago Asuncion.

Crawford has won various prizes and competitions. At age 18, he won First Prize in the Philadelphia Orchestra’s 2011 Greenfield Competition’s Senior Division. As a result, he was a soloist in a concert with the Philadelphia Orchestra. In addition, he was the inaugural recipient of the American Recital Debut Award. As a winner, he made his Carnegie Hall debut. Crawford has also won First Prize in the 2019 IX International Carlos Prieto Cello Competition and has been named Classical Recording Foundation’s 2019 Young Artist of the Year. In 2021, he was the 2021-2023 Young Artist in Strings at the National Federation of Music Club. He has also received awards at the American String Teachers National Solo Competition, Lynn Harrell Competition of the Dallas Symphony Orchestra, Hudson Valley Competition and Kingsville International Competition. He has been a fellow at Music from Angel Fire in New Mexico, the Fontainebleau Schools in France and the National Arts Centre of Canada, among others.

Crawford has been featured in various books, films and TV interviews such as The Talent Code by Daniel Coyle, the 2015 film Maestro and Al Punto with Jorge Ramos. He performs on a rare 200-year-old European cello that his grandfather, Robert Popper, smuggled out of Austria and his bow is from 1790 by Tourte "L'Aîné". Crawford is currently based in New York City.
