= Matthew Wilson (political scientist) =

American political scientist

J. Matthew Wilson
- Citizenship: United States
- Occupation: Associate Professor of Political Science
- Awards: HOPE Professor of Excellence; Teaching Fellowship (Maguire Center for Ethics)

Academic background
- Education: Duke University (MA, PhD); Louisiana State University (BA)

Academic work
- Discipline: Political Science
- Sub-discipline: Public opinion, elections, political psychology, representation, religion and politics
- Website: Matthew Wilson - SMU

James Matthew Wilson (Matthew Wilson) is an American academic and political scientist, who specialises in public opinion, elections, representation, political psychology, and the role of race and religion in politics, in the United States and internationally.

Wilson is an Associate Professor in the Department of Political Science at Southern Methodist University (SMU) in Dallas, Texas, and a Senior Fellow of the Tower Center for Public Policy and International Affairs. He is Kairo Endowed Director of SMU's Center for Faith and Learning.

== Early life and education ==
Wilson is an alumnus of Louisiana State University where he holds a Bachelor of Arts degree in History and Political Science. He earned an MA and PhD in Political Science from Duke University.

== Academic career ==
Wilson is an authority on public opinion, elections, political psychology, representation, and religion and politics both in the United States and abroad. He has written, co-authored, or edited books, articles, and essays on the various subject matters.

Wilson has been the recipient of several grants to fund research from the American Political Science Association, the University Research Council, the Tower Center for Public Policy and International Affairs, and the Sam Taylor Fund of the United Methodist Church.

Wilson frequently gives public lectures on American politics. He is a regular voice on American and international affairs on local, national, and international media outlets including the BBC World Service, France 24, and the New York Times.

== Honors ==
HOPE Professor of Excellence award from SMU's Department of Residence Life.

Teaching Fellowship form the Cary Maguire Center for Ethics and Public Responsibility.

== Selected publications ==
=== Books ===
- Corbett, M., Corbett-Hemeyer, J., and Wilson, J.M. (2014) Politics and Religion in the United States. New York and London: Routledge.
- Brooks, S., Koopman, D.L., Wilson, J.M. (2013) Understanding American Politics. Toronto: University of Toronto Press.
- Wilson, J.M. (ed.) (2007) From pews to polling places: Faith and politics in the American religious mosaic. Washington, DC: Georgetown University Press.

=== Book chapter ===
Wilson, J.M. (2007) ‘Religion and American political life: A look forward’, in Wilson, J.M. (ed.) From pews to polling places: Faith and politics in the American religious mosaic. Washington, DC: Georgetown University Press.

=== Journal articles ===
- Gomez, B.T. and Wilson, J.M. (2001) ‘Political sophistication and economic voting in the American electorate: A theory of heterogeneous attribution’, American Journal of Political Science, 45(4), pp. 899–914.
- Gomez, B.T. and Wilson, J.M. (2003) ‘Causal attribution and economic voting in American congressional elections’, Political Research Quarterly, 56(3), pp. 271–282.
- Gronke, P., Koch, J. and Wilson, J.M. (2003) ‘Follow the leader? Presidential approval, presidential support, and representatives’ electoral fortunes’, The Journal of Politics, 65(3), pp. 785–808.
- Lusztig, M. and Wilson, J.M. (2005) ‘A new right? Moral issues and partisan change in Canada’, Social Science Quarterly, 86(1), pp. 109–128.
- Wilson, J.M. and Lusztig, M. (2004) ‘The spouse in the house: What explains the marriage gap in Canada?’, Canadian Journal of Political Science/Revue canadienne de science politique, 37(4), pp. 979–995.
- Gomez, B.T. and Wilson, J.M. (2006a) ‘Cognitive heterogeneity and economic voting: A comparative analysis of four democratic electorates’, American Journal of Political Science, 50(1), pp. 127–145.
- Gomez, B.T. and Wilson, J.M. (2006b) ‘Rethinking symbolic racism: Evidence of attribution bias’, The Journal of Politics, 68(3), pp. 611–625.
- Gomez, B.T. and Wilson, J.M. (2007) ‘Economic voting and political sophistication: Defending heterogeneous attribution’, Political Research Quarterly, 60(3), pp. 555–558.
- Gomez, B.T. and Wilson, J.M. (2008) ‘Political sophistication and attributions of blame in the wake of Hurricane Katrina’, Publius: The Journal of Federalism, 38(4), pp. 633–650.
- Wilson, J.M. (2012) ‘How are we doing? Group-based economic assessments and African American political behavior’, Electoral Studies, 31(3), pp. 550–561. https://doi.org/10.1016/j.electstud.2012.04.003
- Wilson, J.M. (2019) ‘The nature and consequences of ideological hegemony in American political science’, PS: Political Science & Politics, 52(4), pp. 724–727. https://doi.org/10.1017/S1049096519000659
- Hollifield, J.F. and Wilson, J.M. (2026) ‘Immigration, anomie, and national populism in the European Union’, Frontiers in Political Science, 8, article 1846381. https://doi.org/10.3389/fpos.2026.1846381
