= Fadel Mohammed Ali =

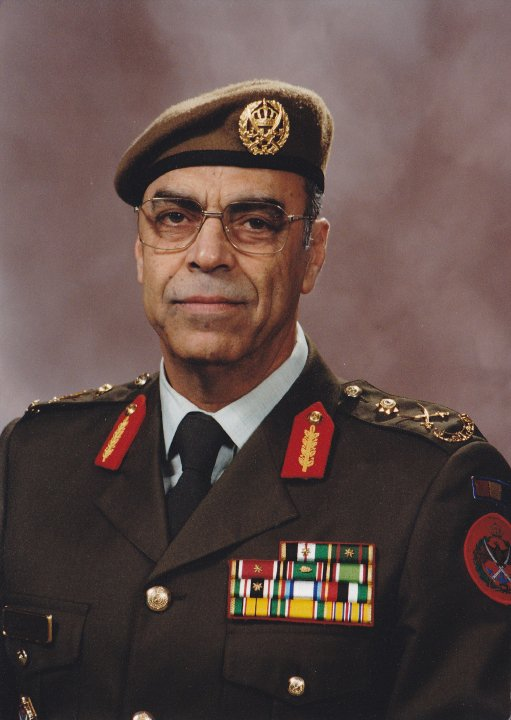
- Born: 1945; Tira/Ramallah, West bank of Jordan
- Died: 2010 (aged 64–65); Amman, Jordan
- Military career
- Branch: Jordanian Army (Maintenance corps)
- Service years: 1970-2001
- Rank: Major General
- Commands: Commander of Royal Maintenance Corps

Major General Engineer Fadel Mohammed Ali (Arabic: اللواء المهندس فضل محمد علي; 2010–1945) was the Director of Royal Maintenance Corps of the Jordanian Armed Forces responsible for supporting continuous operations for the military, until the year 2001.

== Early life ==
Fadel was born in Ramla in 1945. He finished his GCSE from Ramala in 1965 ranking 4th among all his peers that graduated in 1964 in Jordan.

== Education ==
Fadel pursued his bachelor's degree in Electrical Engineering at Alexandria University, Egypt, and graduated in 1970 ranking one of the top 10 graduates. After joining the Army, he was sent in a scholarship to Dallas, Texas, United States, where he finished his master's degree from Southern Methodist University in 1978 with an honors ranking. During his military career, he passed many training courses in the US, UK & France.

== Scientific Research Papers ==
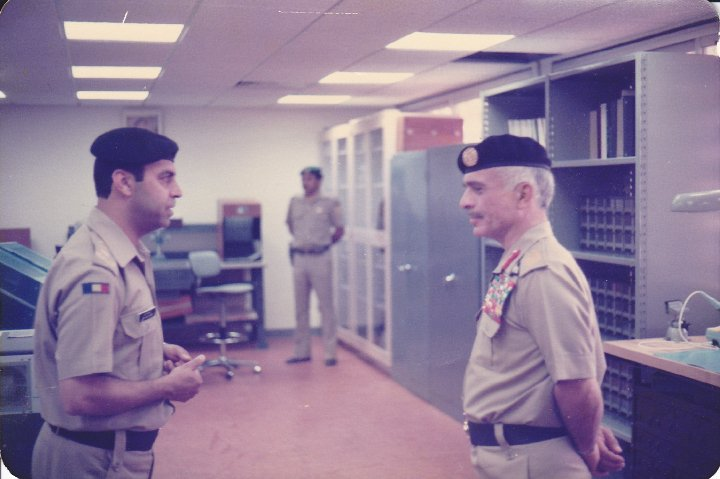
With his Majesty King Hussain, 1992

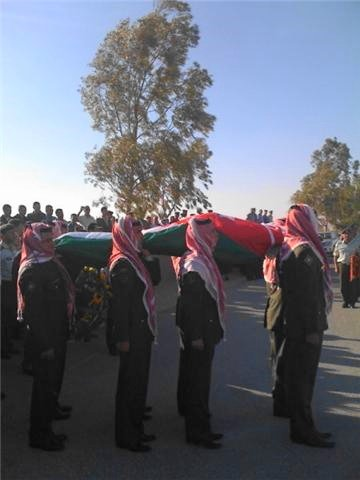
Major General Fadel Funeral, 2010

- Computer Applications in Modern Military Equipment and Army Maintenance Approach

Prepared for the University of Jordan, Faculty of Engineering and Technology

- Calibration Policy and Requirements

Paper prepared when The Arab Organization for Standardization and Metrology (ASMO) organized a Symposium on Metrology for the Development of Arab Countries in cooperation with the University of Jordan.

- Laboratory Electronic Equipment Maintenance

This paper had been prepared when the University of Jordan, Faculty of Engineering and Technology, organized a Regional Symposium on Laboratory Equipment Maintenance in cooperation with the UNESCO Regional Office for science and Technology in the Arab countries (ROSTAS).

- National Information Bank for Electronic Instruments

Prepared for the General Headquarters of the Jordanian Armed Forces (JAF) according to Prince AL-HASSAN instructions during his meeting with the JAF Engineers

- National Computer Software Center, Jordan

Prepared for the National Resources Development Company, Amman – Jordan

- Laser and Night Vision Equipment

- Infra - Red Thermal Imagining Systems
- Image Intensifier Tube Night Vision Systems
- LASER Tank Fire Control Systems, LTFCS
- Wire Guided Missiles
- LASER Simulating Systems, LSS
- LASER (Characteristics, Types, Elements, Civilian & Military Applications)

== Positions held ==
- 1972–1980 Chief of the Armored Vehicles, Guided Weapons and Electronic Sections
- 1980–1984 Chief of the Technical Research and Development Branch at DRMC
- 1984–1990 Commander of the Electronic Equipment Workshops
- 1990–1992 Head of the Technical Division (Directorate of the Royal Maintenance Corps, DRMC)
- 1992–2000 Commander of the Electronic Equipment Workshops
- 2000–2001 Director of ‘The Royal Maintenance Corps’ – Jordan Armed Forces
- 2001–2003 King Abdullah II Design & Development Bureau (KADDB) Technical Consultant. CLS-Jordan Associate Director / KADDB
- 2003–2005 Prince Faisal IT Center (PFITC) Director General / KADDB
- 2005–2008 Technical Consultant for both Jordanian ESARSV and an American company, VSE
- 2008–2010 Owner Representative / Chief of Engineering Department at Tala Bay
