= Donald Holmquest =

American astronaut (born 1939)

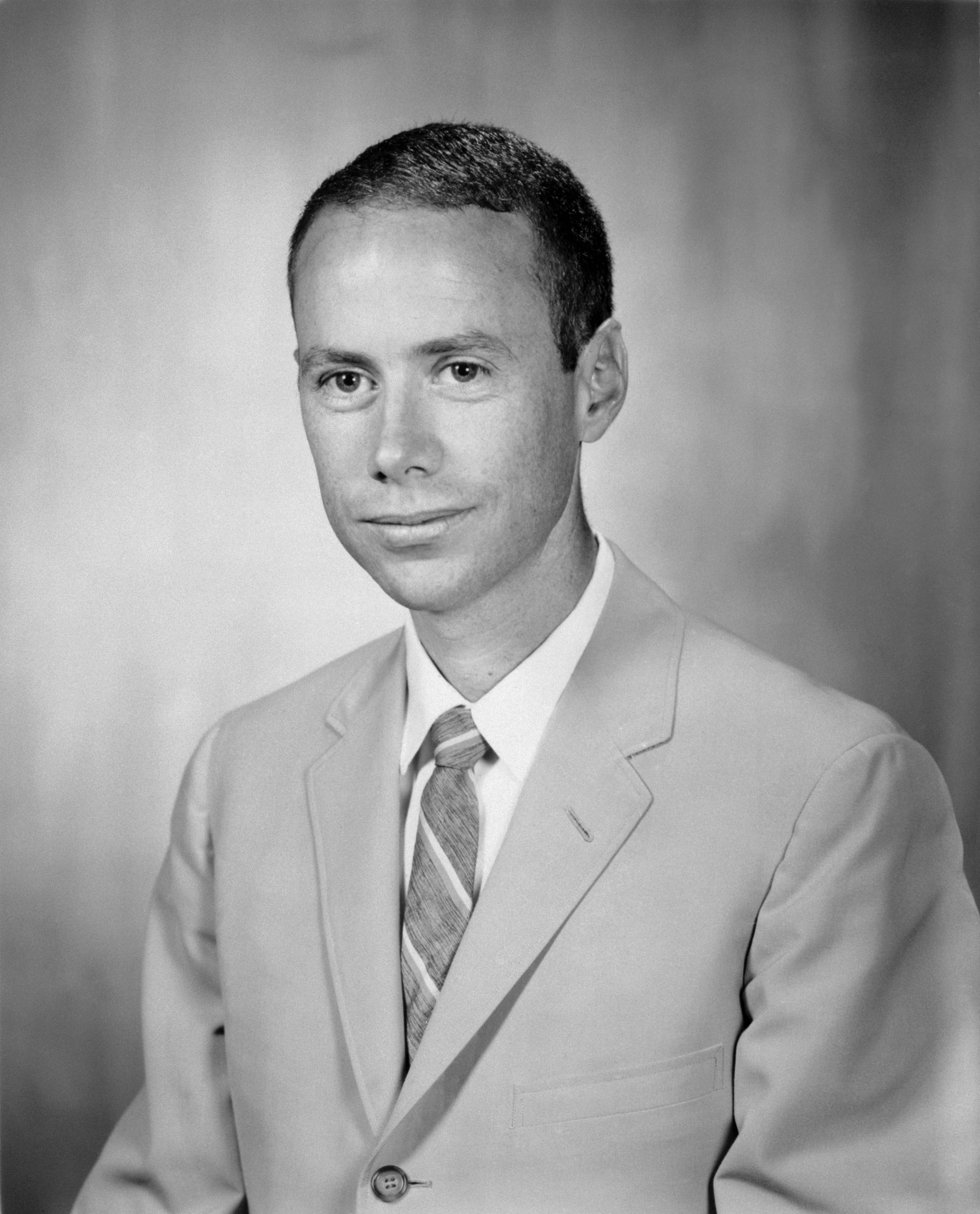
- Born: Donald Lee Holmquest; April 7, 1939 (age 87); Dallas, Texas, U.S.
- Education: Southern Methodist University (BS); Baylor University (MD, PhD); University of Houston (JD)
- Space career

NASA astronaut
- Selection: NASA Group 6 (1967)
- Retired: September 1973
- Scientific career
- Fields: Physiology
- Thesis: Thermal Rhythms in the Rat: The Influence of Environmental and Physiological Factors as Studied by Telemetry (1968)

Donald Lee Holmquest (born April 7, 1939) is an American lawyer, physician, electrical engineer, and former NASA astronaut. He was the CEO of the California Regional Health Information Organization (RHIO).

== Biography ==
=== Early life and education ===
Holmquest was born on April 7, 1939, in Dallas, Texas. After graduating from Dallas’s Adamson High School, he received a B.S. in electrical engineering from Southern Methodist University with highest honors in 1962.

After receiving his M.D. (1967) and a Ph.D. in physiology (1968) from Baylor College of Medicine, Holmquist began a residency in internal medicine at Houston Methodist Hospital.

He married Charlotte Ann (née Blaha) in 1967. They have one daughter.

=== NASA career ===
Holmquest joined NASA as a scientist-astronaut after completing his internship. After a year of flight training at Williams Air Force Base, Arizona, he earned his Air Force wings, and then worked for 1 1/2 years on Skylab habitability systems and medical experiments. During this time, he logged 750 hours flying time in jet aircraft.

When not assigned to a Skylab prime or backup crew by May 1971, however, Holmquest took a leave of absence from NASA in order to return to Baylor College of Medicine to train in nuclear medicine. He formally resigned from the Astronaut Corps in September 1973.

=== Post-NASA career ===
After completing his residency training, Holmquest assumed the role of chief of nuclear medicine at Ben Taub General Hospital, a primary public teaching hospital at Baylor. He was then recruited to California’s Eisenhower Medical Center to establish their Department of Nuclear Medicine. He was then named associate dean of medicine at Texas A&M University as it developed its new College of Medicine.

Holmquest earned a J.D. degree cum laude from the University of Houston Law Center in 1988. While he continued to practice medicine and serve as adjunct professor of medicine at Baylor College of Medicine, Holmquist also worked as a lawyer, focused on matters related to the health care industry. After working as a senior partner at Wood, Lucksinger & Epstein, he established the firm of Holmquest & Associates.

Holmquest resides in Menlo Park, California.

== Bibliography ==
Holmquest's career is chronicled in the book NASA's Scientist-Astronauts by David Shayler and Colin Burgess.
