= Christine Hamm =

American politician (1942–2026)

Member of the New Hampshire House of Representatives from the Merrimack 34th district
- In office 2002–2004

Member of the New Hampshire House of Representatives from the Merrimack 4th district
- In office 2004–2012

Personal details
- Born: Christine Carenbauer; October 1, 1942 Wheeling, West Virginia, U.S.
- Died: June 16, 2026 (aged 83) Portland, Oregon, U.S.
- Party: Democratic
- Spouse: James Hamm (m. 1962, divorced)
- Children: 3
- Education: Rosary College; Southern Methodist University

Christine Carenbauer (October 1, 1942 – June 16, 2026) was an American politician. A member of the Democratic Party, she served in the New Hampshire House of Representatives from 2002 to 2012.

== Early life and career ==
Hamm was born in Wheeling, West Virginia, on October 1, 1942, the daughter of George Edward Carenbauer Jr. and Mary Eleanore Greene. She attended and graduated from Mount de Chantal Visitation Academy. After graduating, she attended Rosary College and Southern Methodist University.

She served in the New Hampshire House of Representatives from 2002 to 2012. She moved to Portland, Oregon in 2016.

== Personal life and death ==
In 1962, she married James Hamm. They had three children. Their marriage ended in divorce.

Hamm died at her home in Portland, Oregon, on June 16, 2026, at the age of 83.
