= Hart Energy =

American publisher

- Company type: Privately held company
- Industry: Petroleum industry
- Founded: 1973; 53 years ago
- Headquarters: Houston, Texas, United States
- Area served: Worldwide
- Key people: John Hartig, CEO; Chris Arndt, CFO; Mark Chiles, CTO
- Website: www.hartenergy.com

Hart Energy, based in Houston, publishes online newspapers and magazines covering the petroleum industry and provides related research and consulting services.

== History ==
The company was founded in Denver in 1973. Phillips International acquired the company in 1991 and sold it in 2000 for over $100 million. In March 2004, the company was acquired by management and changed its name to Hart Energy Publishing, LP.

In October 2010, Hart Energy acquired Rextag Strategies Mapping & Data Services. In 2025, Rextag was sold to Yellow Point Energy Partners.

On May 2, 2013, Hart Energy acquired Subsea Engineering News.

Hart Energy features an annual listing of influential women in energy.

In February 2025, Hart Energy was acquired by Crain Communications.
