= International Association of Speakers Bureaus =

The International Association of Speakers Bureaus (IASB) is a 501(c)(6) nonprofit trade membership organization of speakers bureaus, lecture agencies and speaker management companies located around the world. Founded in 1986.

== History ==
In 1986, the International Group of Agencies and Bureaus (IGAB) was founded by Dottie Walters and is headquartered in Arizona. In July 2000, the Board of Governors of IGAB voted to form a separate organization called the International Association of Speakers' Offices (IASB). In 2002, IGAB merged with the IASB, incorporating it as a nonprofit organization in Indiana on July 1, 2002. In 2010, the organization moved its headquarters to Arizona.

IASB is a member of the Events Industry Council and the NSA-IASB Council and works collaboratively with other organizations in the Meetings and Events Industry to provide support, guidance and information for its members. Among the partner organizations are:

- American Society of Association Executives (ASAE)
- Events Industry Council (EIC)
- Global Speakers Federation
- Meeting Professionals International (MPI)
- National Speakers Association (NSA)
- Professional Convention Management Association (PCMA)

Presidents since its foundation

IGAB
Presidents	Years
John Palmer	1986–1988
Ed Larkin	1988–1989
Barbara Kinkaide	1989–1990
Rich Tiller	1990–1992
Judith Shepherd	1992–1994
Claire Carter	1994–1996
Rod Patterson	1996–1998
Deborha Lilly	1998–2000
Jo Cavender	2000–2001
Nancy Lauterbach	2001–2002

IASB
Presidents	Years
Nancy Lauterbach	2002–2003
Brad Plumb	2003–2004
Deborah Lilly	2004–2005
Dick Hall	2005–2006
Karen Kendig	2006–2007
Shayna Stillman	2007–2008
Rich Gibbons	2008–2009
Kelly Eger	2009–2010
Duane Ward	2010–2011
Theresa Beenken	2011–2012
Gail Davis	2012–2013
Holli Catchpole	2013–2014
Brian Palmer	2014–2015
Katrina Smith	2015–2016
Karen Harris	2016–2017
Daniel Romero-Abreu	2017–2018
Charlotte Raybourn	2018–2019
Nick Gold	2019–2020
Shawn Hanks	2021–2022
Tim Mathy	2022–2023
Martin Perelmuter	2022–2024
