= The Houstonian (newspaper) =

Newspaper

Coordinates: 30°42′51″N 95°32′51″W

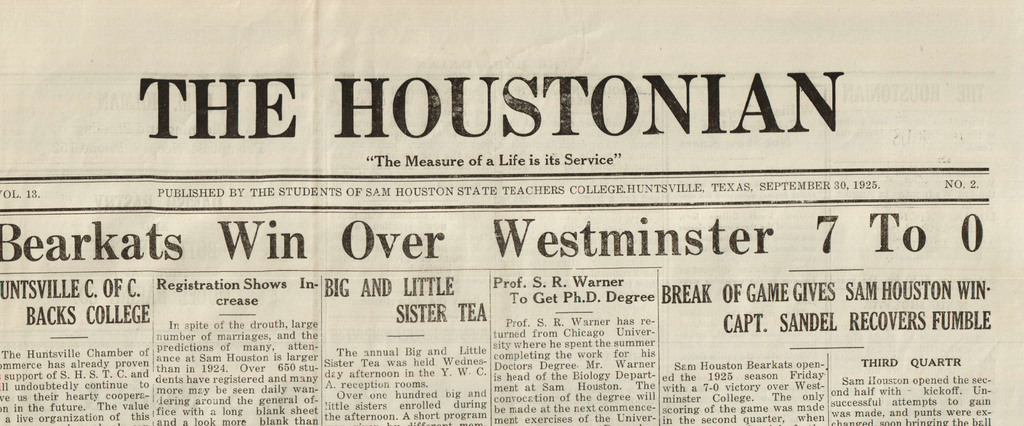
- The Houstonian in 1925
- Type: Student newspaper
- Publisher: Sam Houston State University
- Founded: 1913
- Language: English
- Headquarters: Huntsville, Texas
- OCLC number: 15021861
- Website: Official website

The Houstonian is a campus newspaper at Sam Houston State University (SHSU). The paper was founded in 1913. CBS News journalist Dan Rather served as editor of the newspaper before his graduation from SHSU in 1953. In 1994, the university named the headquarters of the paper the Dan Rather Communications Building. Before his 2005 retirement, CBS created the Dan Rather Scholarship Fund in honor of the journalist, with preference towards those working at The Houstonian.

The university hired investigative journalist Craig Flournoy in 1997 to both teach journalism at the school and supervise production at The Houstonian. During the 1997-1998 period, the students reported on key issues at the school, including instances of inflated grades by professors, rape occurrences at the school, and a revealing Texas state audit performed on the university.

Prior to her 1997 graduation from SHSU, Jenna Jackson served as editor of The Houstonian. She went on to join CBS News in New York, and won an Emmy Award in 2012 for her work on the television program 48 Hours. Jackson later returned to Texas and advised journalism students at SHSU in the College of Fine Arts and Mass Communication.

== History ==
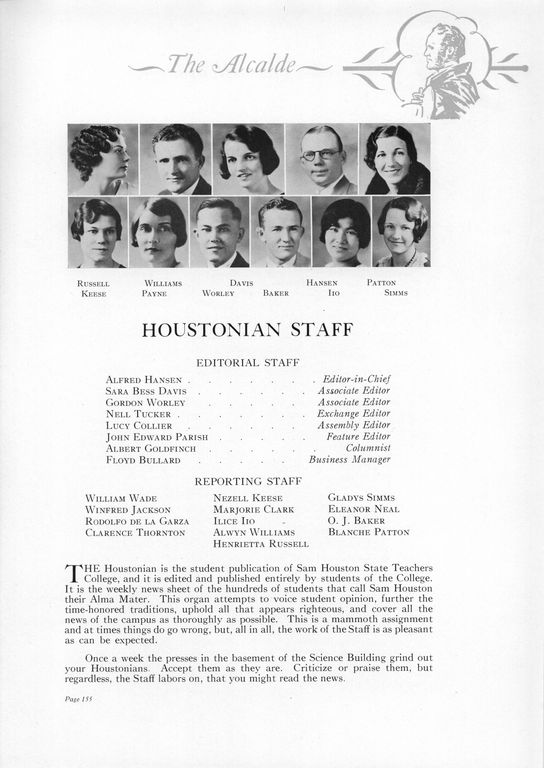
Newspaper staff in 1932

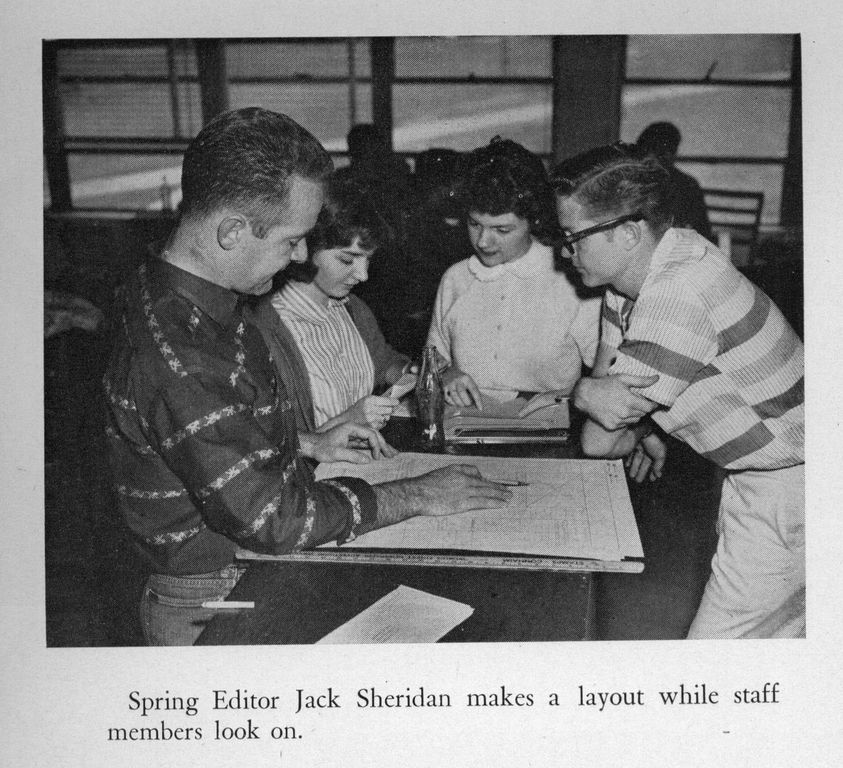
Newspaper staff in 1960

The Houstonian was founded in 1913 at Sam Houston State University (SHSU). The paper produces two editions per week.

Dan Rather graduated from SHSU in 1953 with a Bachelor of Arts degree in journalism. During 1952, Rather had served as editor of the paper. The Houstonian is headquartered in the Dan Rather Communications Building at SHSU. The university named the building after Rather in 1994. Prior to his 2005 retirement, CBS created a scholarship program at SHSU, titled the Dan Rather Scholarship Fund. The fund was intended for students focusing on studies of journalism. Rather asked CBS to specify that the fund should give students preferential status for selection to the program if they worked either on a volunteer or paid arrangement for The Houstonian.

After graduating from Grayson College in 1967, Don Eldredge went on to further studies at SHSU where he became editor of The Houstonian. Eldredge subsequently became editor of The Herald Democrat in Sherman, Texas.

Craig Flournoy was brought on by SHSU in 1997 both to instruct students in journalism and serve as an advisor for The Houstonian. During the 1997-1998 period, the students reported on key issues at the school, including instances of inflated grades by professors, rape occurrences at the school, and a revealing Texas state audit performed on the university. The Houstonian was first to report that a state audit performed on the university revealed that due to poor supervision from the president, the auditor of the university itself had not performed its task adequately. In response the president of the university both denied there was an issue and simultaneously switched to a different auditor. The students produced 19 articles reporting on incidents of rape at the university. School officials stated that in the previous five years there had been zero rapes reported at the university. Journalists at The Houstonian uncovered information documenting that in the previous 20 months there were seven reports of rape by attendees of SHSU. The paper reported that grade inflation was a significant ongoing issue at the school. The most senior academic official at the university denied there was an issue at the school with grade inflation. One week before this school official gave this statement, seven professors from the communications division of academics at the university (reflecting twenty-five percent of the total faculty in the department) stated they had handed in inflated grades.

Jenna Jackson served as editor of The Houstonian prior to her graduation from SHSU in 1997 with a B.A. in political science and journalism. She went on to work for CBS News in New York. While working at 48 Hours for CBS, she received an Emmy Award in 2012. Jackson came back to Texas and launched P&R Productions, a company focusing on producing films and documentaries. Jackson came back to SHSU to gives talks to students in the College of Fine Arts and Mass Communication.

Kuyk Logan joined SHSU in 2002 to serve as the Philip G. Warner Endowed Chair in Journalism until 2004. Logan came in for the outgoing Ardyth Sohn who had served in the role from 2000. Logan was faculty adviser for The Houstonian in this role. Prior to his appointment, Logan had served at KHOU-TV and the Houston Post as managing editor.

In 2012 the paper was cited by CNN for advice on senioritis, a period of time when upperclassmen in college feel lack of motivation for studies due to impending graduation. CNN noted that the paper advised students to fully utilize resources during their time at the educational institution. The Houstonian recommended students seek out assistance from tutoring services, study in the library, and dedicate themselves to full engagement in the classroom setting.

The editor-in-chief of The Houstonian in 2013 was Stephen Green; he simultaneously worked as a staff reporter for The Huntsville Item. The editor-in-chief of The Houstonian in 2014-2015 is Jay R. Jordan, succeeding previous EIC Connor Hyde.

== See also ==
- List of newspapers in Texas
- The Huntsville Item
