= Jerry Fullinwider =

American businessman

Jerome M. Fullinwider
- Education: SMU
- Occupation: Businessman
- Spouse: Leah

Jerry Fullinwider was an American businessman and the founder of Hillwood International Energy.

== Personal life and education ==
Fullinwider graduated from the Naval School of Justice, and served in Korea and China, retiring as a lieutenant. Fullinwider earned a bachelor's degree from SMU. Fullinwider's daughter, Sarah, is married to Ross Perot Jr.

== Career ==
Fullinwider began his career in oil with Standard Oil of Ohio, and later worked with Cherry Brothers in Dallas. Fullinwider moved to West Texas in the 1960s with little money in the bank, founding V-F Petroleum. In 1989, Fullinwider met with high-ranking USSR oil officials. He ultimately founded V-F Russia to explore for oil in Siberia. Fullinwider also founded HKN Energy and Hillwood International Energy, as well as BaiTex LCC, which operates in the Baituganskoye oil field of Southern Russia.

== Political and religious activity ==
Fullinwider was a major donor to conservative political causes affiliated with the Koch Brothers. Fullinwider supports SMU's O’Neil Center for Global Markets and Freedom, a free market think tank. Fullinwider also had an endowed teaching position, the Jerome M. Fullinwider Endowed Centennial Chair in Economic Freedom, named for him.

Fullinwider was an elder with Highland Park Presbyterian. In 2011, Fullinwider successfully invited Hilarion Alfeyev, a Russian Orthodox Metropolitan, to visit and preach in Texas.
