= Ownby Stadium =

Stadium in University Park, Texas, US

- Location within Texas Location within the United States
- Address: 5800 Ownby Dr.
- Location: University Park, Texas
- Coordinates: 32°50′22″N 96°46′56″W
- Owner: Southern Methodist University
- Operator: Southern Methodist University
- Capacity: 23,783
- Surface: Natural grass
- Acreage: 1.2 acres (0.49 ha)

Construction
- Groundbreaking: 1926
- Opened: 1926
- Closed: 1998
- Demolished: October 1998
- Architects: DeWitt & Lemmon
- Builder: Osborne Engineering Co.

Tenants
- SMU Mustangs (NCAA) (1926–1948, 1989–1994); Dallas Tornado (NASL) (1976–1979)
- Jordan C. Ownby Stadium
- Formerly listed on the U.S. National Register of Historic Places
- Architectural style: Colonial Revival, Georgian Revival
- MPS: Georgian Revival Buildings of Southern Methodist University TR (AD)
- NRHP reference No.: 80004093

Significant dates
- Added to NRHP: September 27, 1980
- Removed from NRHP: September 23, 2004

Ownby Stadium was a stadium in the University Park suburb of Dallas, Texas. It was the home of the Southern Methodist University Mustang football team. In late 1998, the stadium was demolished to build Gerald J. Ford Stadium at the site.

== Background ==
Named for Jordon Ownby, the stadium was built at the south end of the campus. There was controversy at the time of the stadium's inception, as the school had spent the gift from Ownby on a stadium (per his wishes) rather than a full-sized library, which the school did not have at the time.

As the Mustangs rose to prominence in the 1930s, they began scheduling an increasing number of games at the much larger Cotton Bowl, which was already twice Ownby's size. They finally moved there on a permanent basis in 1948, while later moving to Texas Stadium. However, after massive rules violations resulted in the NCAA handing down the "death penalty" in 1987, SMU officials decided to move football games back to a heavily renovated Ownby Stadium.

From 1976 to 1979 the chief tenant at Ownby was the Dallas Tornado of the North American Soccer League.

The 23,783-seat stadium consisted of four grandstands, one on each side, with the west (home) side being larger than the rest. In late 1998, the stadium was demolished to make way for Gerald J. Ford Stadium, which stands on the same site.

== See also ==
- National Register of Historic Places listings in Dallas County, Texas
