= Highland Park United Methodist Church =

Highland Park Methodist Church
- Highland Park Methodist Church
- 32.837328°N 96.786190°W
- Location: 3300 Mockingbird Lane, Dallas, Texas
- Country: United States
- Denomination: Methodist Church
- Website: hpmc.org

History
- Founded: 1916
- Dedicated: 1943

Architecture
- Architect(s): Mark Lemmon; Roscoe DeWitt

Clergy
- Pastor(s): Paul Rasmussen; Matt Tuggle; Walt Marcum; Abe Smith; Camille May

Highland Park Methodist Church is a Methodist congregation in the town of Highland Park, in Dallas County, Texas. The church is adjacent to the campus of Southern Methodist University. As of 2024, it had 15,240 members and an average attendance of 4,324.

== History ==
In February 1916, a Methodist congregation met on the campus of Southern Methodist University for the first time to worship together. It was organized as a congregation of the Methodist Episcopal Church, South (MECS). It was initially named University MECS, but by the fall of that year, the student congregation joined Methodists in the newly forming Town of Highland Park and the church was renamed Highland Park MECS. A year later, in 1917, a temporary church building called "The Little Brown Church" was erected.

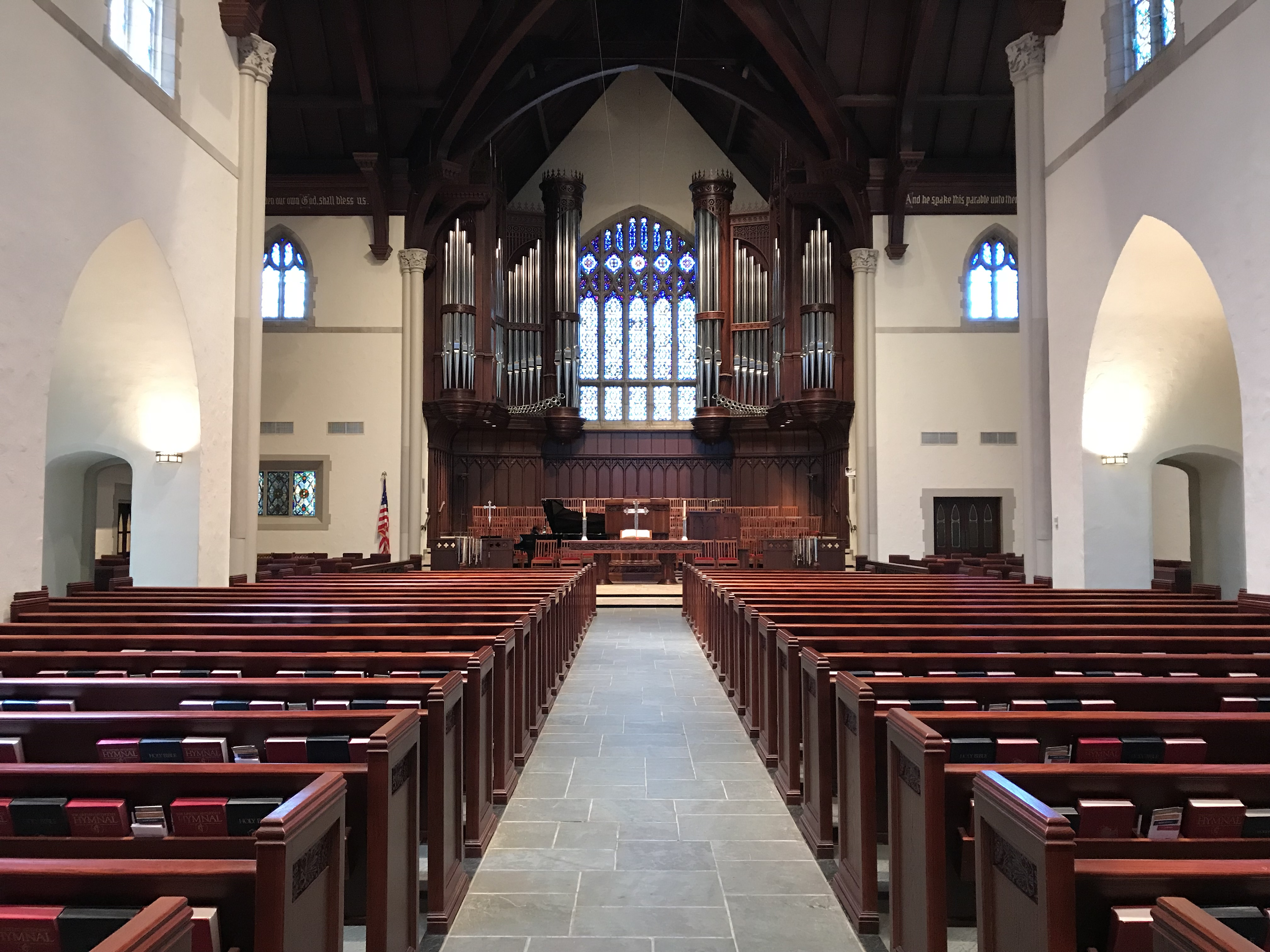
Highland Park UMC Sanctuary

The current sanctuary was designed by architect Mark Lemmon (1889–1975) and Roscoe DeWitt (1894-1975) and built in 1927. The first service in the sanctuary was held on February 6, 1927, when Umphrey Lee served as the pastor. The Great Depression came and it took 15 years to pay off the debt. When it was paid, the church building was dedicated in 1943.

Lee left Highland Park Methodist in 1936 and was followed by Marshall Steel, who served from 1936 to 1957. Following Steel, William Dickinson served from 1958 to 1972. He was followed by Leighton K. Farrell], the church's longest serving minister, who was appointed in 1972 and served as senior pastor until 1995.

In 1995, the Rev. Mark Craig became senior minister, a position he held until 2013. Rev. Paul Rasmussen served as senior minister from 2013 to 2026. In 2026, Rev. Matt Tuggle became the senior minister.

In 2010, after much restoration, the former Munger Place United Methodist Church located in the Munger Place Historic District, became the Old East Dallas satellite campus of Highland Park United Methodist Church, operating as Munger Place Church. In 2024, Munger Place Church was spun off from HPUMC and now operates once again as an independent United Methodist Church.

In 2017, HPUMC launched a new campus in North Dallas, called The Grove Church, located on the site of the former Schreiber Memorial United Methodist Church.

In January 2021, HPUMC launched a new campus, Uptown Church, that met in the House of Blues in the Uptown neighborhood of Dallas. It was one of the first churches within the United Methodist denomination that was planted and led by two female ministers. After almost three years of faithful ministry, the leaders of HPUMC made the decision to close Uptown Church, with Uptown Church's last service being held on November 12, 2023.

After the United Methodist Church voted at its General Conference in 2024 to remove the denomination's prohibitions on hosting same-sex weddings, senior minister Paul Rasmussen announced that Highland Park UMC would continue to prohibit same-sex wedding ceremonies on its property, stating that "For 108 years, through 13 different senior ministers, Highland Park has always maintained the traditional definition and understanding of Christian marriage when it comes to weddings within our worship facilities", he said. "We are going to continue to uphold the traditional definition of marriage in our worship venues." Rasmussen went on to say that clergy could perform same-sex weddings at other venues in the community "based on their conscience".

In 2024, John Fiedler, a pastor at Highland Park UMC, was charged with solicitation of prostitution in relation to a police inspection of a massage parlor in Carrollton, Texas, on October 2, 2024. After learning of the pastor's pending criminal charge and quietly accepting Fiedler's resignation, the church removed from its website all references to Fiedler, who had served at the church since 2013, first as the preacher for the 11:00 a.m. traditional worship service, and later as executive minister. The church did not inform the congregation of the pending criminal matter until after the charges were published by multiple news outlets in January 2025.

In October of 2025, the Horizon Texas Conference of the United Methodist Church became concerned about changes HPUMC made to its governance structure in 2022 and early 2023 that the conference believed put the church out of compliance with the denomination’s Book of Discipline. After meetings in October, December, and March, the conference and the church were unable to resolve this problem. On August 10, 2026, the conference filed a lawsuit against the church asking the court to restore the structure to what it was before the changes. HPUMC ministers said they were surprised and saddened by the lawsuit. Senior Minister Matt Tuggle explained that the changes were made following a 2020 Texas Supreme Court decision that allowed the Episcopal Diocese of Fort Worth to evict six churches from their buildings and elevated the role of neutral principles in church property disputes.

In October of 2026, the church voted to split from the United Methodist Church, leading to a legal battle with the Horizon Texas Conference.

== Notable churchgoers ==
- Former American president and Texas governor George W. Bush
- Former Dallas Cowboys head coach Tom Landry
- Former Dallas mayor Robert L. Thornton
- Former CEO of American Airlines Doug Parker
