= Park Cities Presbyterian Church =

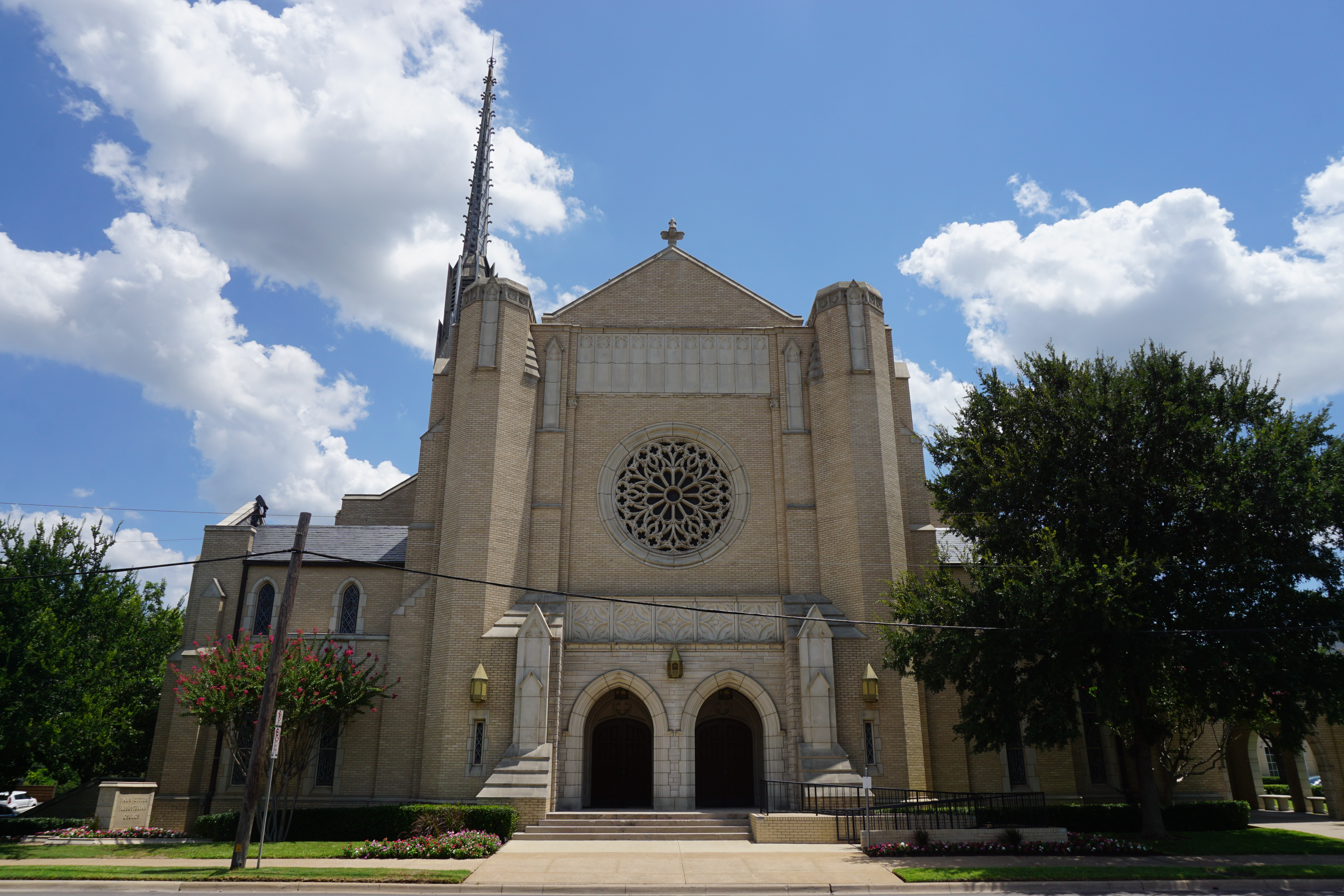
- Park Cities Presbyterian Church
- Location: 4124 Oak Lawn Avenue Dallas, TX 75219
- Country: USA
- Denomination: Presbyterian Church in America
- Churchmanship: Evangelical, Reformed
- Website: pcpc.org

History
- Founded: May 26, 1991

Architecture
- Architectural type: Gothic Revival

Park Cities Presbyterian Church (PCPC) is a Presbyterian Church in America megachurch in Dallas, Texas with about 5,500 members.

It is member of the North Texas Presbytery of the PCA.

== History ==
PCPC's origins started out of a failed attempt by Highland Park Presbyterian Church to withdraw from the Presbyterian Church (U.S.A.) Although a simple majority (2,563) voted to withdraw and 2,001 to remain in the PC(USA), the vote required a 2/3 majority and thus the motion failed.

At that time, Highland Park was the second-largest Presbyterian congregation in the US with more than 7,000 members. It was a bastion of conservative theology within the PC(USA).

A group of individuals thus decided to leave HPPC and form a Presbyterian congregation not affiliated with PC(USA). The first worship service was held on May 29, 1991 in the auditorium of Highland Park High School. The attendance was about 1,500-2,000, who followed elder Harry Hargrave and other dissenting leaders the next Sunday after the vote. In June 1991, PCPC started meeting in the facilities of Highland Baptist Church; PCPC would ultimately purchase the building. On June 23, 1991, the congregation adopted its current name. The Highland Park Church lost more than a quarter of its membership, which resulted in decreased tithing, budgetary tightening, and downsizing at the church complex on University Boulevard. Many who left Highland Park were elders and deacons. The majority of Sunday school teachers also left. Morale among those who stayed declined.

The first senior pastor of Park Cities congregation was Rev. Skip Ryan, who served until 2006. During Pastor Ryan's 15 years of ministry, the church grew from 1,500 members to 5,000-5,500. During this time, the church helped plant 57 other churches in Dallas and around the world. On May 11, 2008, Rev. Mark Alan Davis was installed as senior pastor.

== Doctrine ==
The church theologically describes itself as evangelical, evangelistic, Reformed, confessional, covenantal, Presbyterian and Kingdom-centered. The Westminster Confession of Faith is the official standard. The mission statement of the church “to extend the transforming presence of the Kingdom of our Lord Jesus Christ in Dallas and to the world.”

== Missions ==
Park Cities Presbyterian Church is involved in several home mission efforts, including the Southwest Church Planting Network of the PCA, which facilitates new PCA churches be planted in Texas, Oklahoma, New Mexico and Arizona. There are outreach and Presbyterian church planting works in Laos (Lao Presbyterian Fellowship), Senegal, Japan, South India, Peru, and Ukraine.
