= Sam Rayburn Library and Museum =

- U.S. National Register of Historic Places
- Recorded Texas Historic Landmark
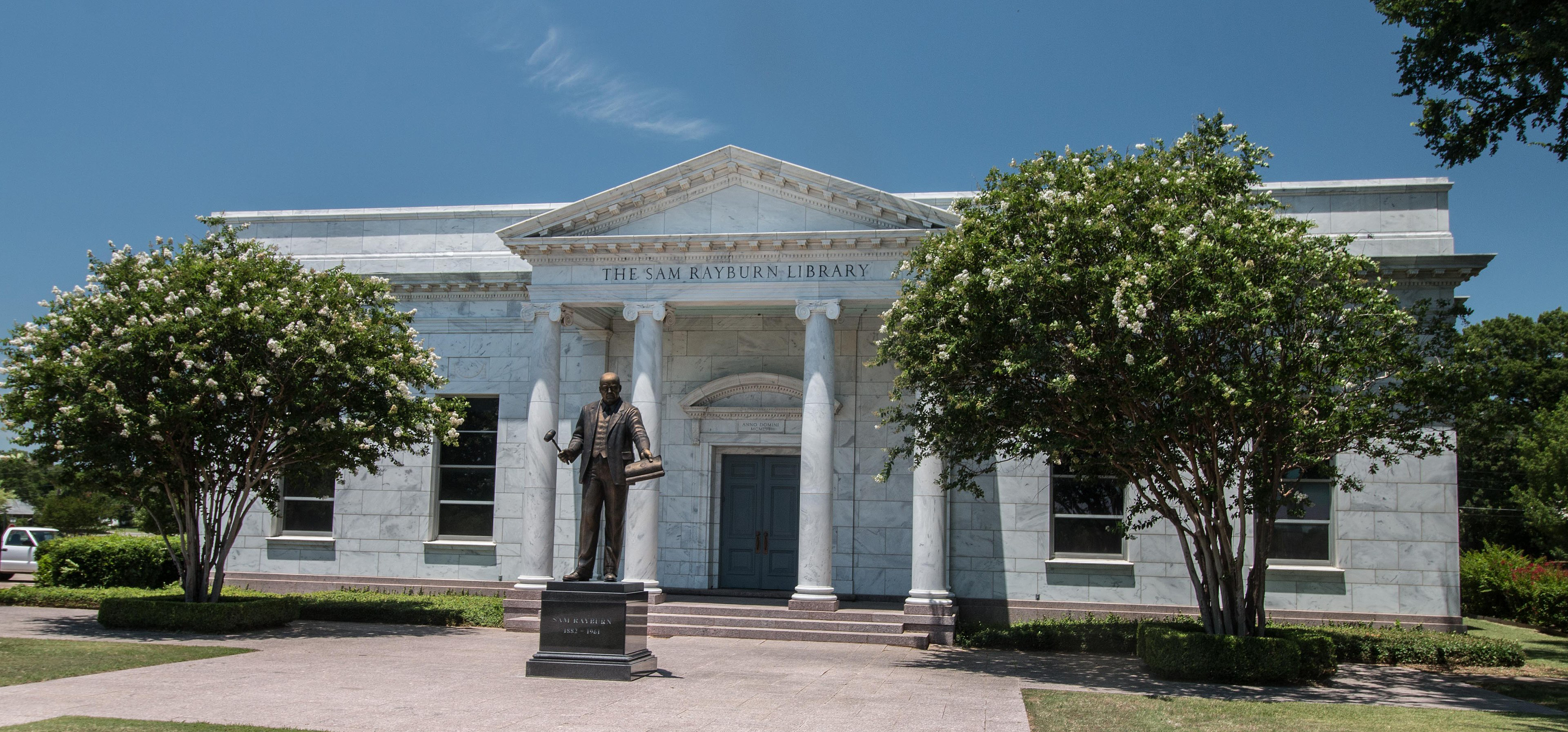
- Sam Rayburn Library in 2018

- Location within Texas Location within the United States
- Location: 800 W. Sam Rayburn Dr., Bonham, Texas
- Coordinates: 33°34′48″N 96°11′16″W
- Area: 5.3 acres (2.1 ha)
- Built: 1957
- Built by: Carpenter Bros.
- Architect: Roscoe DeWitt
- Architectural style: Classical Revival
- Website: Sam Rayburn Museum
- NRHP reference No.: 05000386
- RTHL No.: 15226

Significant dates
- Added to NRHP: May 6, 2005
- Designated RTHL: 2008

The Sam Rayburn Library and Museum is a public research center, library, and museum at 800 West Sam Rayburn Drive in Bonham, Texas. It was built in 1957 as a working library and research center for Sam Rayburn (1882–1961), the influential United States Congressman who holds the record as the longest-serving Speaker of the United States House of Representatives. The building, designed by Roscoe DeWitt, is the most prominent example of Classical Revival architecture in Fannin County, expressly evoking the Classical architecture of Washington, D.C. The library is now operated as part of the Dolph Briscoe Center for American History, part of the University of Texas at Austin.

The building was listed on the National Register of Historic Places in 2005.

== Overview ==
In 1957 Rayburn dedicated the library in the style of a presidential library to preserve his memory, library collection, honors, and mementos. Former president Harry Truman was the guest of honor at the dedication ceremony. While other Speakers of the House have public or university libraries named in dedication to them this library is unique in that the library is solely dedicated to being a library about Rayburn's life as well as being an archival library about Congress from the 1770s to the present day.

The library building has a steel and concrete framework with solid brick walls and is faced with gleaming white Georgia marble and looks like many Classical-style buildings in Washington, D.C. such as the White House and the Lincoln Memorial. It is set on a base of Texas red granite.

In its original 1957 configuration the main lobby, made of black Italian marble, featured the original white marble rostrum that stood in the House of Representatives from 1857 until 1950 with a bronze statue of Rayburn standing behind it. The rostrum was moved to the main exhibit room in the 2012 renovation of the library. An exact replica of Rayburn's office is in the library. The furniture in this office was actually in the Speaker's Office in Washington, D.C. from 1907 to 1957. The fireplace immediately behind the speaker's desk was originally installed in the House of Representatives in 1857, where it remained for ninety-two years until its removal during the U.S. Capitol renovation project in 1949–1950. This office served as Rayburn's official office from 1957 to 1961 whenever he returned home to Bonham to serve his constituents. The chandelier in Rayburn's office was originally installed in the White House during the Grant administration but was later transferred to the U.S. Capitol on the orders of Theodore Roosevelt who complained about the noise that the chandelier caused.

In the west wing are two galleries, the H.G. Dulaney Gallery and the Rostrum Gallery. These galleries feature items from Rayburn's life, from his early childhood to his days as Speaker. The Dulaney Gallery's centerpiece is a white fireplace mantle that was installed originally in the Adams Room of the White House but removed during the White House renovation in the late 1940s. The Rostrum Gallery contains the white marble Speaker's rostrum that stood on the dais of the House of Representatives from 1857 until 1950. When the House was renovated in 1950, the rostrum was removed from the Capitol Building. It was presented to Sam Rayburn by his colleagues in the House of Representatives for permanent display in this museum.

The east wing is composed of the reading room where researchers and locals can read Rayburn's personal books and access the complete run of the published proceedings of the United States Congress from the First Continental Congress of 1774 to the present. Rayburn's gifts and honors are also displayed in the reading room, including a 2,500 year old Grecian urn given by the Greek Palace Guard to Rayburn for assisting the Kingdom of Greece during the Greek Civil War.

Outside of the building is a bronze statue of Rayburn that was dedicated in 1990.

== Gallery ==
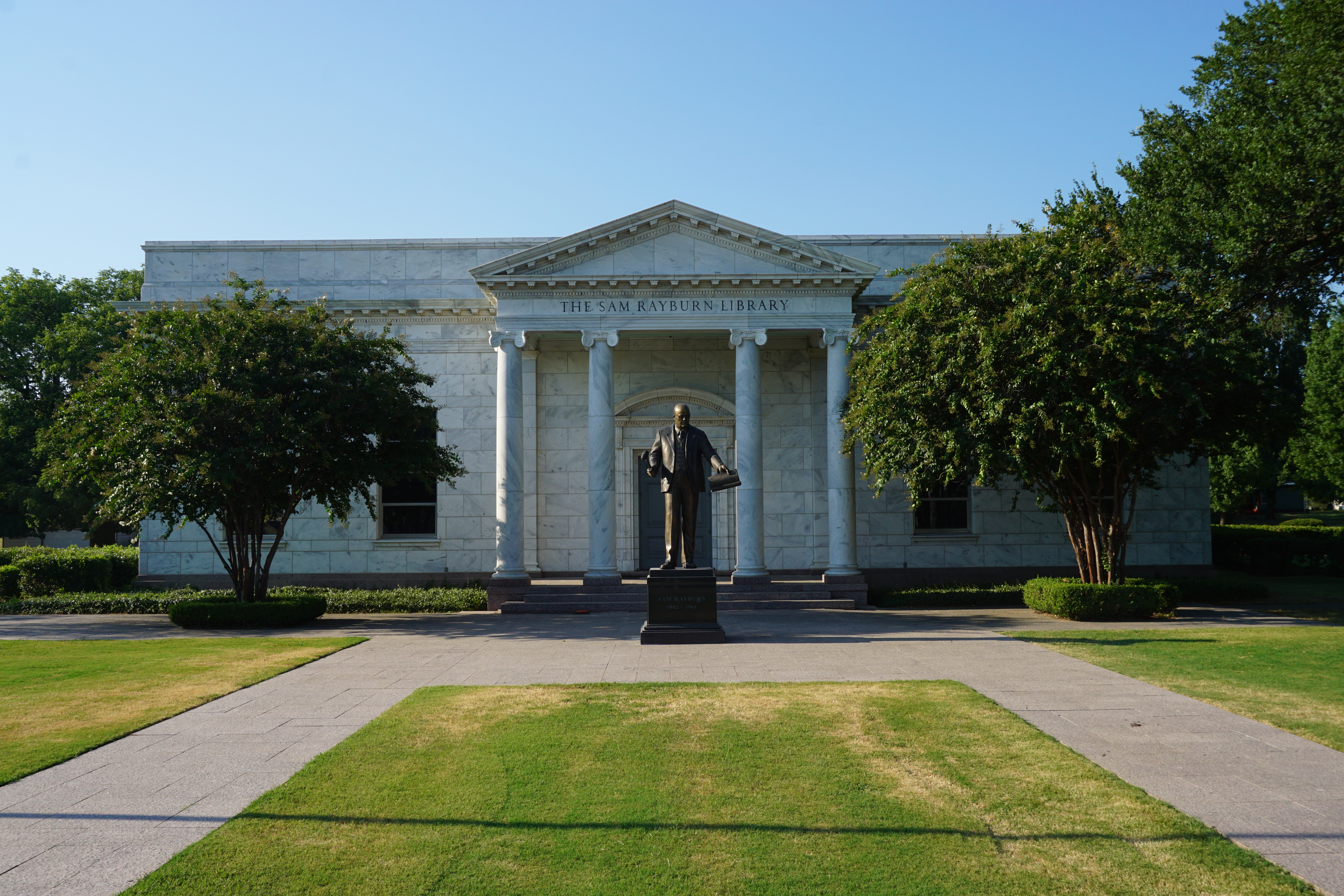
View of the Sam Rayburn Library from outside

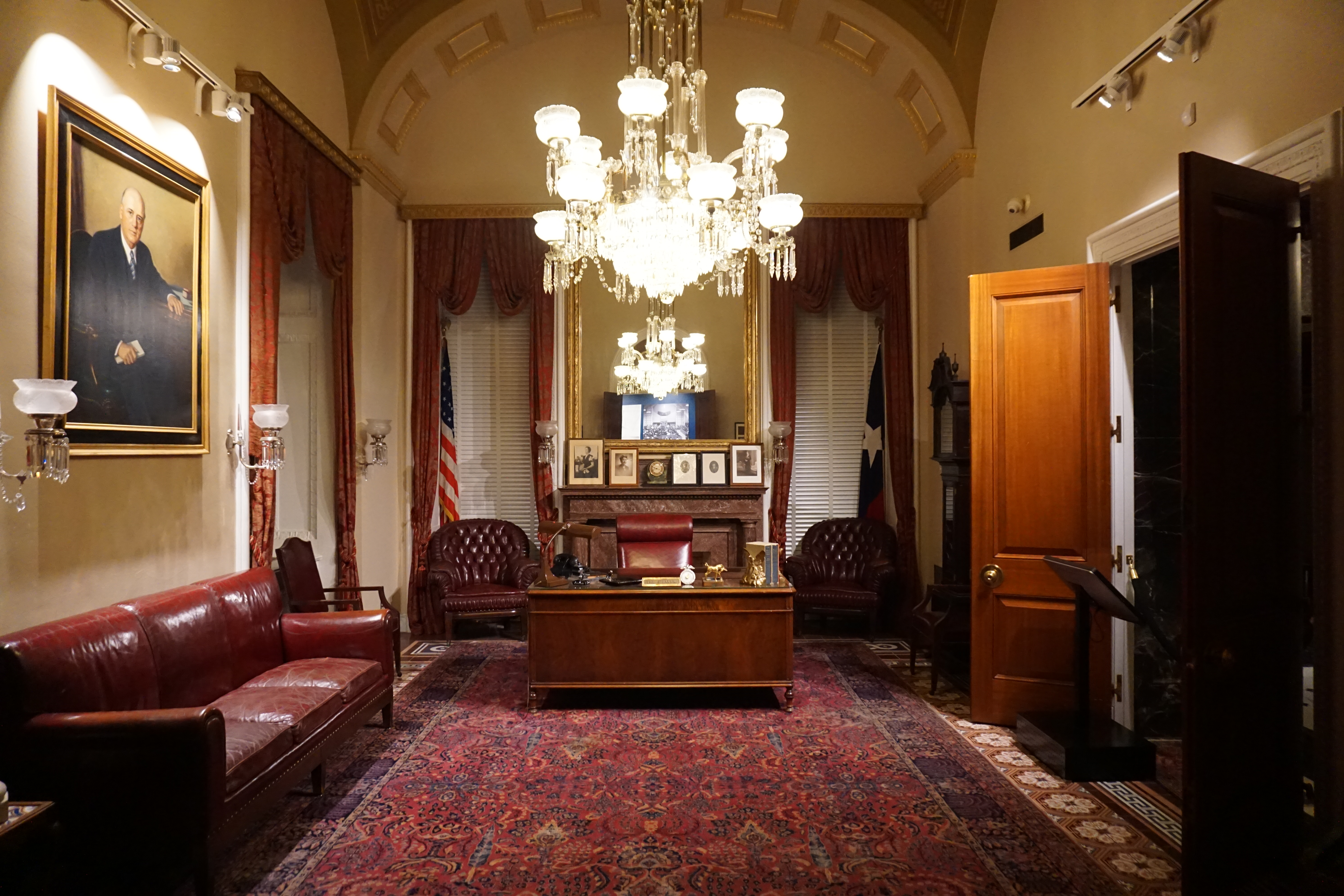
Replica of the Speaker's Office

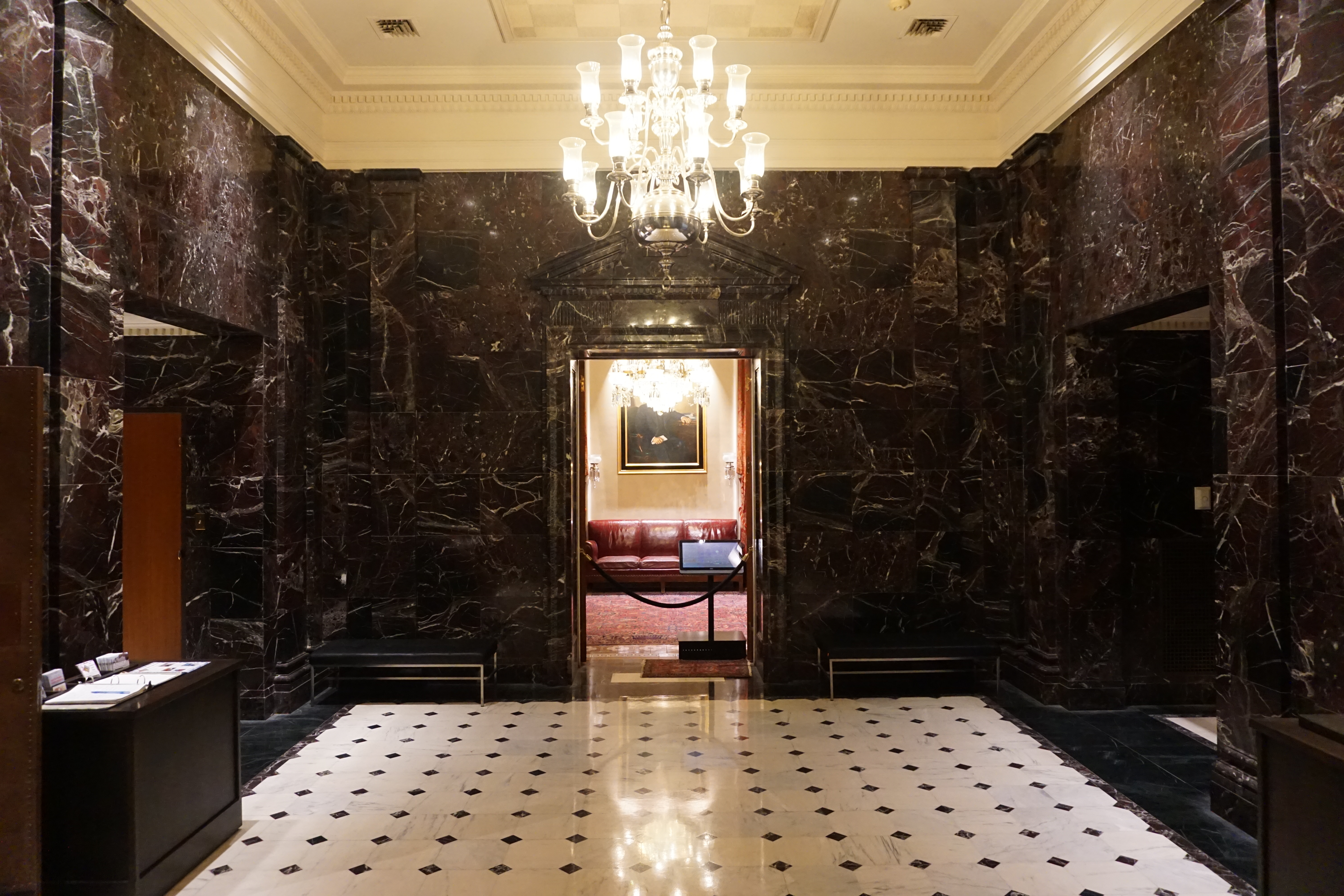
Main lobby

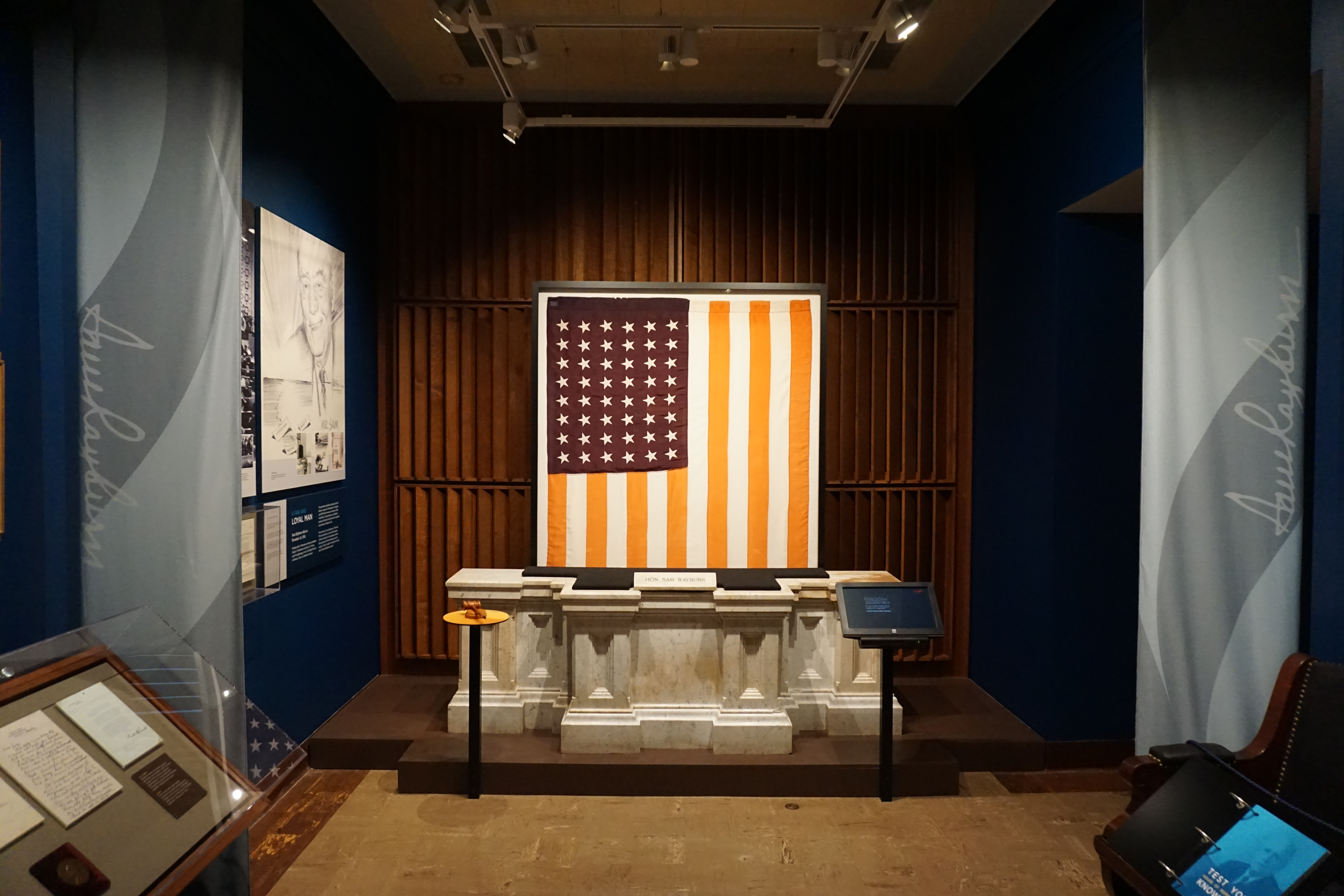
The Rostrum Gallery

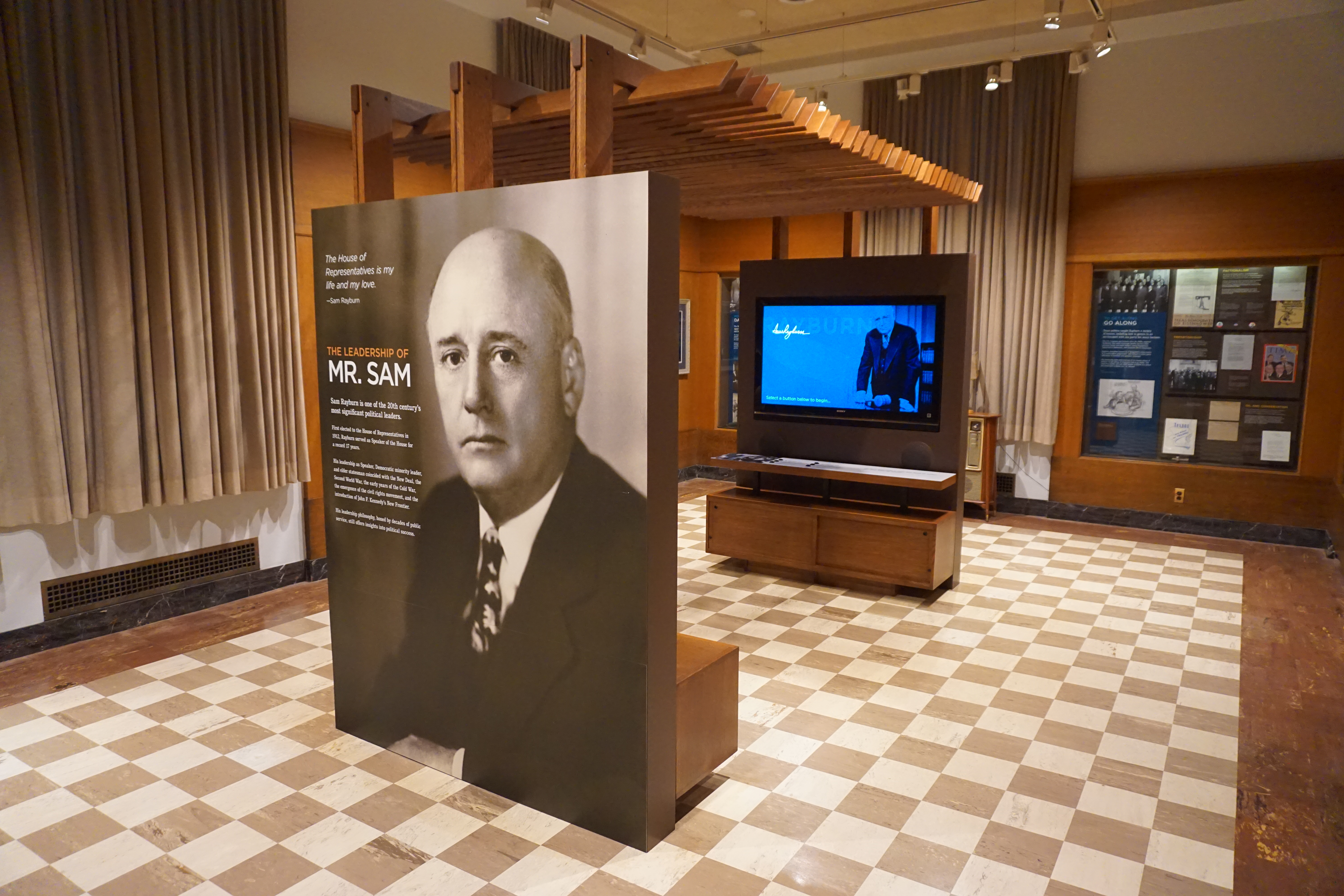
The H.G. Dulaney Gallery

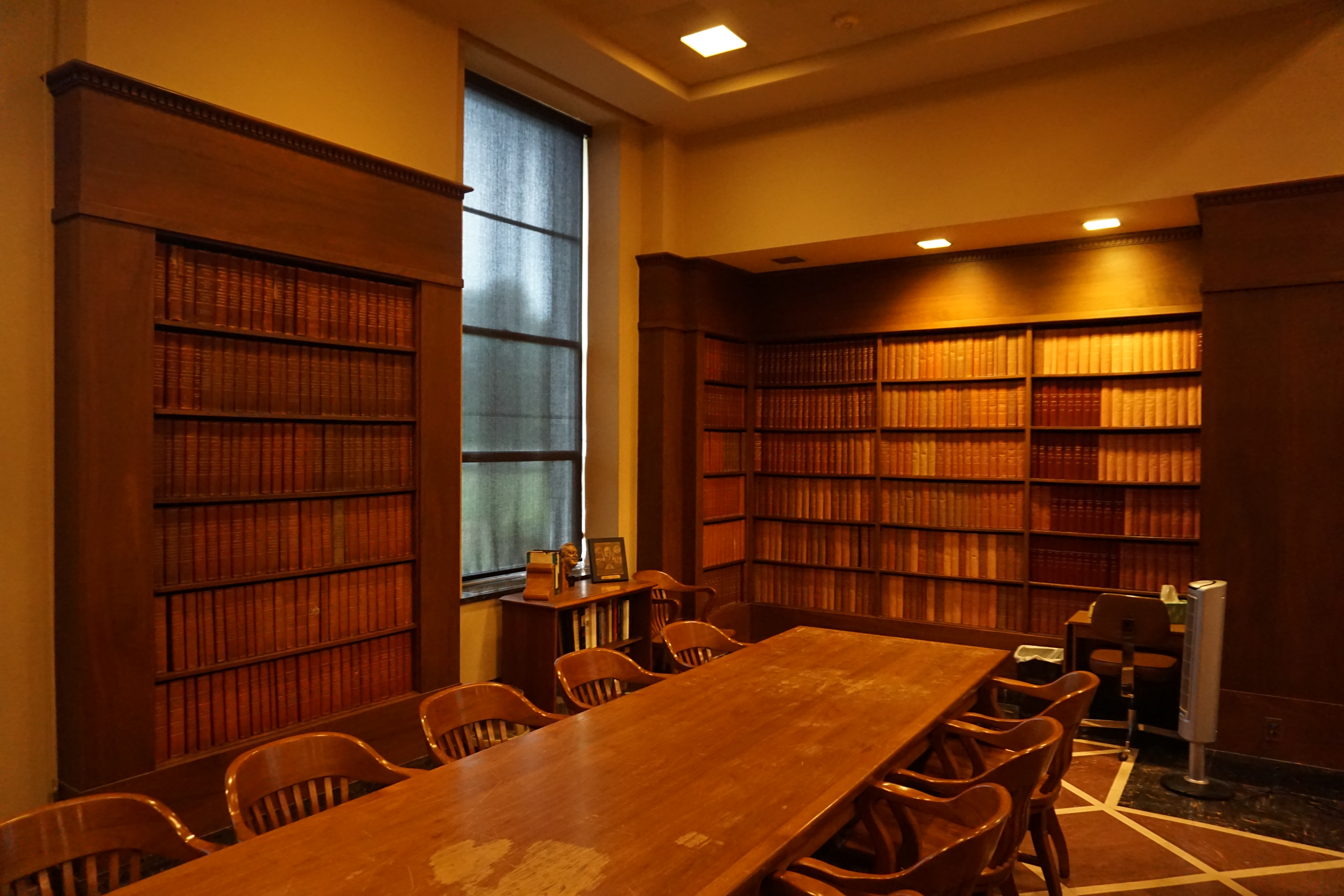
The east wing library

== See also ==
- National Register of Historic Places listings in Fannin County, Texas
- Recorded Texas Historic Landmarks in Fannin County
