= Dedman College of Humanities and Sciences =

School at Southern Methodist University

Logo for the Dedman College of Humanities and Sciences

Dedman College of Humanities and Sciences is the school of liberal arts at Southern Methodist University in Dallas, Texas. The college was named in 1981 in honor of its benefactors, Robert H. Dedman, Sr. and his wife, Nancy McMillan Dedman, both of Dallas.

== Areas of study ==
Bachelor's, Master's, and doctoral degrees are offered through 16 departments in the humanities, social sciences, and the mathematical and natural sciences. Competitive Graduates: The percentage of Dedman students accepted to medical school is typically 10-20 points higher than the national average each year. Publications: Faculty members publish with such university presses as Oxford, Cambridge, Harvard, and Yale. Many of their publications can be seen at the Barnes & Noble SMU Bookstore, which has a section devoted to faculty authors.

== Research grants ==
In 2004, Dedman College researchers generated $7,752,800 of SMU's $19.6 million in competitive research grants, an amount that has increased 52 percent since 1994. Renovated Facilities: In 2006, Dedman College completed the second phase of renovation for the Fondren Science Building, which houses the Department of Chemistry and the Department of Physics. During the prior five years, more than $28 million supported construction and renovation projects for science facilities within the College.

== University Honors Program in the Liberal Arts ==
In 1966, Dr. Franklin G. Balch, a political science professor at SMU, founded the "Superior Studies Program" consisting of 40 students. Over the next decade, Superior Studies was divided between Departmental and General Education programs. Thus, the University Honors Program developed, growing in 2006 to a group of more than 850 students who complete a required minimum of seven courses in the humanities. The UHP (as it is commonly called) focuses on an interaction-based pedagogy. The program notably features smaller classes, highly acclaimed professors, guest lecturers on controversial topics, and free special events for its participants.
