= Dolph Briscoe Center for American History =

Research unit of the university of Texas

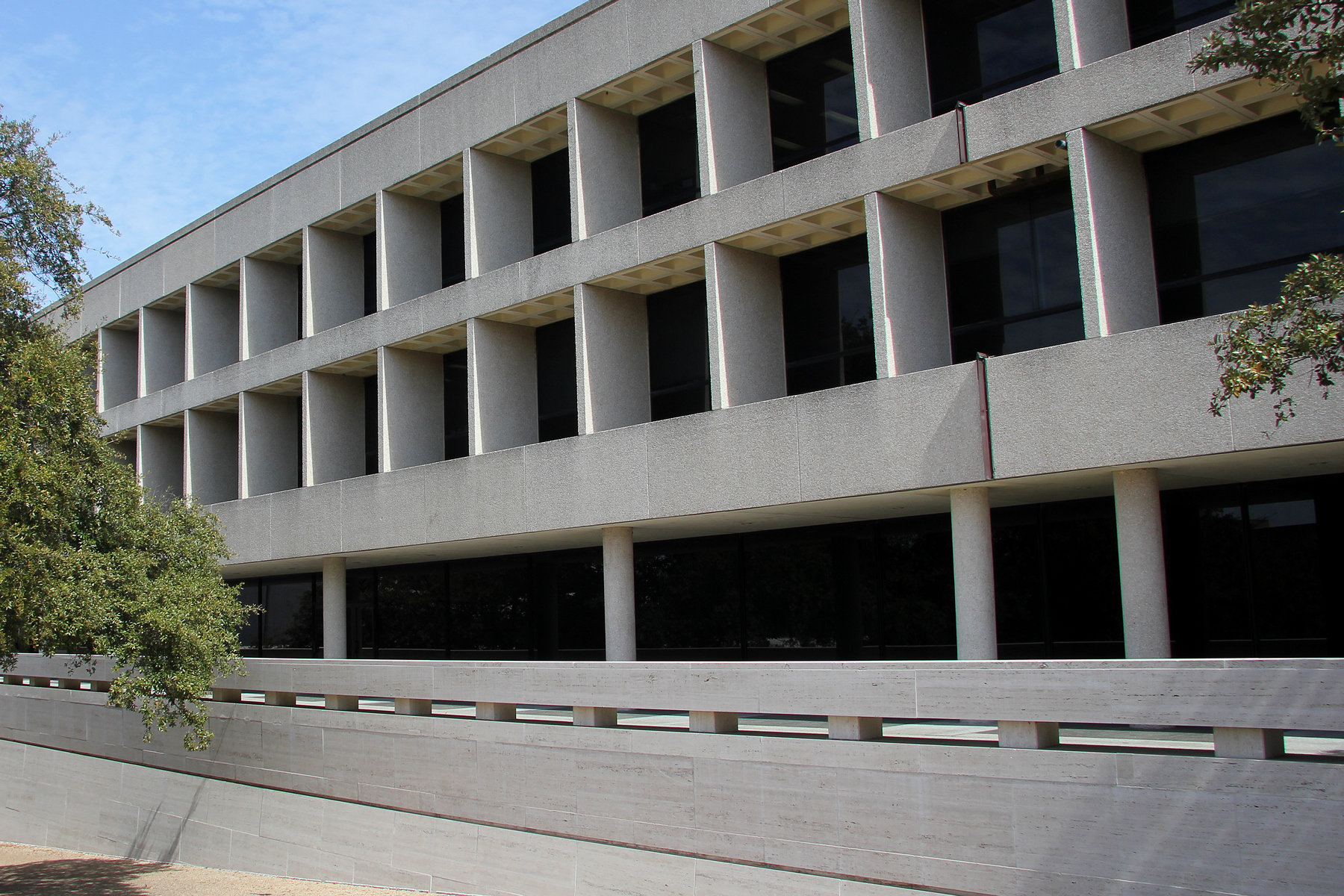
- The entrance to the Research and Collections Division

- Location within Texas
- Location: Austin, Texas, et al
- Coordinates: 30°17′8.5″N 97°43′45″W
- Type: Texas and American history
- Director: Dr. Don E. Carleton
- Public transit access: Capital Metro
- Website: Briscoe Center for American History

The Dolph Briscoe Center for American History is an organized research unit and public service component of the University of Texas at Austin named for Dolph Briscoe, the 41st governor of Texas. The center collects and preserves documents and artifacts of key themes in Texas and United States history and makes the items available to researchers. The center also has permanent, touring, and online exhibits available to the public. The center's divisions include Research and Collections, the Sam Rayburn Museum, the Briscoe-Garner Museum, and Winedale.

== Research and Collections Division ==
The Research and Collections Division is located on the University of Texas campus in Austin. Research and Collections administers the center's main research facility and is the repository for most of the center's books, documents, photographs, sound, and ephemera collections. It was comprehensively renovated in 2017.

== Sam Rayburn Museum ==
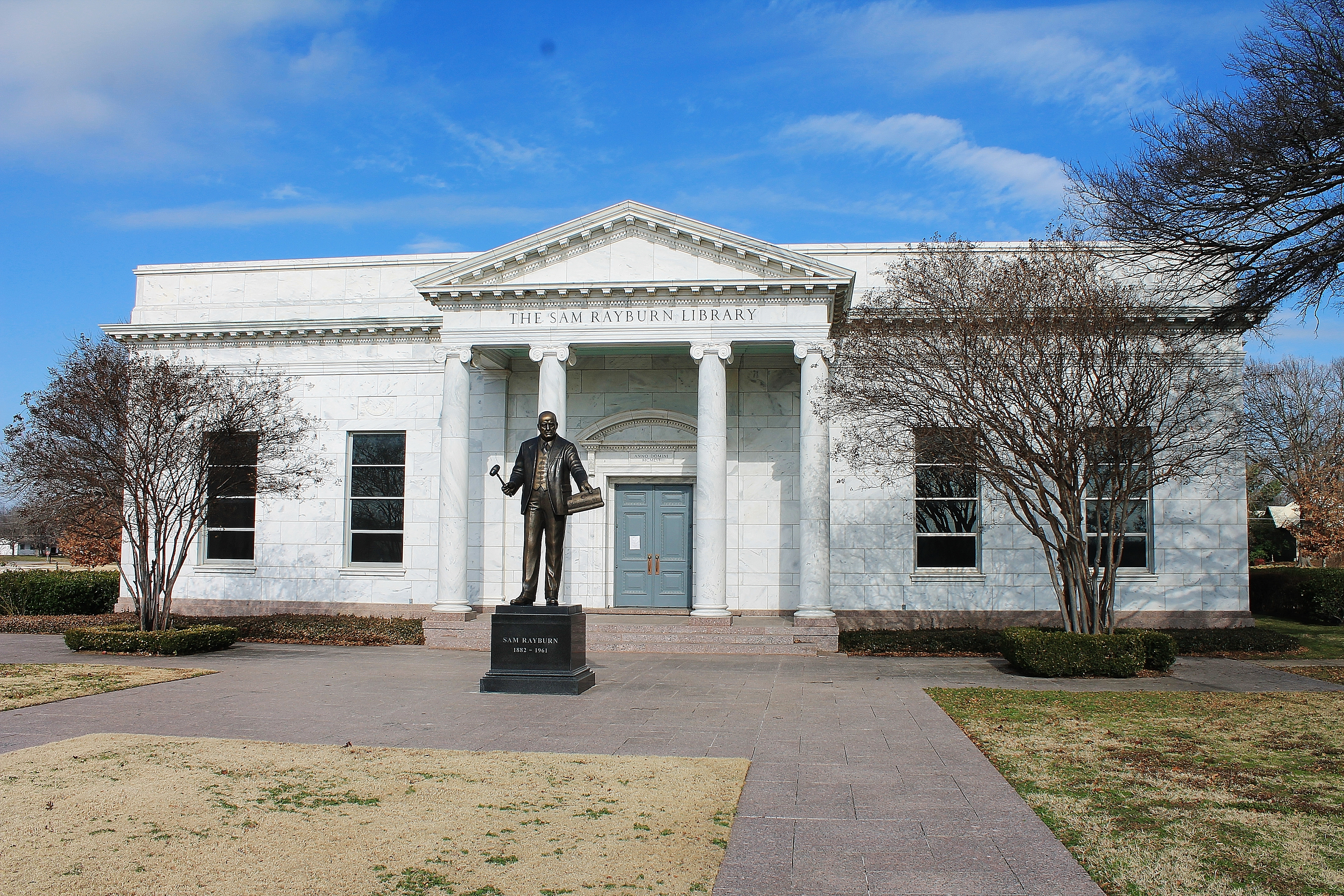
Sam Rayburn Museum in Bonham

The Sam Rayburn Museum is located in Bonham. It contains exhibits documenting the life and career of former Texas congressman and longest-serving Speaker of the United States House of Representatives Sam Rayburn (1940–1947, 1949–1953, and 1955–1961). The Rayburn Museum became a division of the Briscoe Center in 1991 and is open free to the public.

== Briscoe-Garner Museum ==
The Briscoe-Garner Museum (formerly the John Nance Garner Museum) is located in Uvalde. The museum documents the lives of John Nance Garner and Dolph Briscoe, both Uvalde natives and historically important political figures from Texas. On November 20, 1999, the City of Uvalde transferred ownership of the Garner Museum to the University of Texas at Austin to become a division of the Briscoe Center for American History. In 2011, the Board of Regents of the University of Texas System approved the renaming of the John Nance Garner Museum to the Briscoe-Garner Museum, in honor of the late Governor Dolph Briscoe.

== Winedale ==
Winedale is a complex of nineteenth-century structures and modern facilities situated on 225 acres of land near Round Top. Winedale offers examples of early Texas architecture and crafts, an interpretive center, continuing education seminars and other public programs.

Miss Ima Hogg visited the site weekly for review of the project with John Young, a recent architectural graduate of Rice University, who was engaged by Miss Hogg to manage the restoration, perform historical research, hire and train local workers in restoration skills, procure materials, design property plans and prepare progress reports (now in the University of Texas Library). Local workers supervised by Newton Peschel were Newton Vokel, Martin Bartels and Thomas Smith. A mason, Mr. Yoakum, constructed foundations and chimneys.

== See also ==
- Benson Latin American Collection
- List of museums in Central Texas
- List of museums in North Texas
- Archives of American Mathematics
