= Highland Park Presbyterian Church (University Park, Texas) =

Highland Park Pres
- Highland Park Presbyterian Church
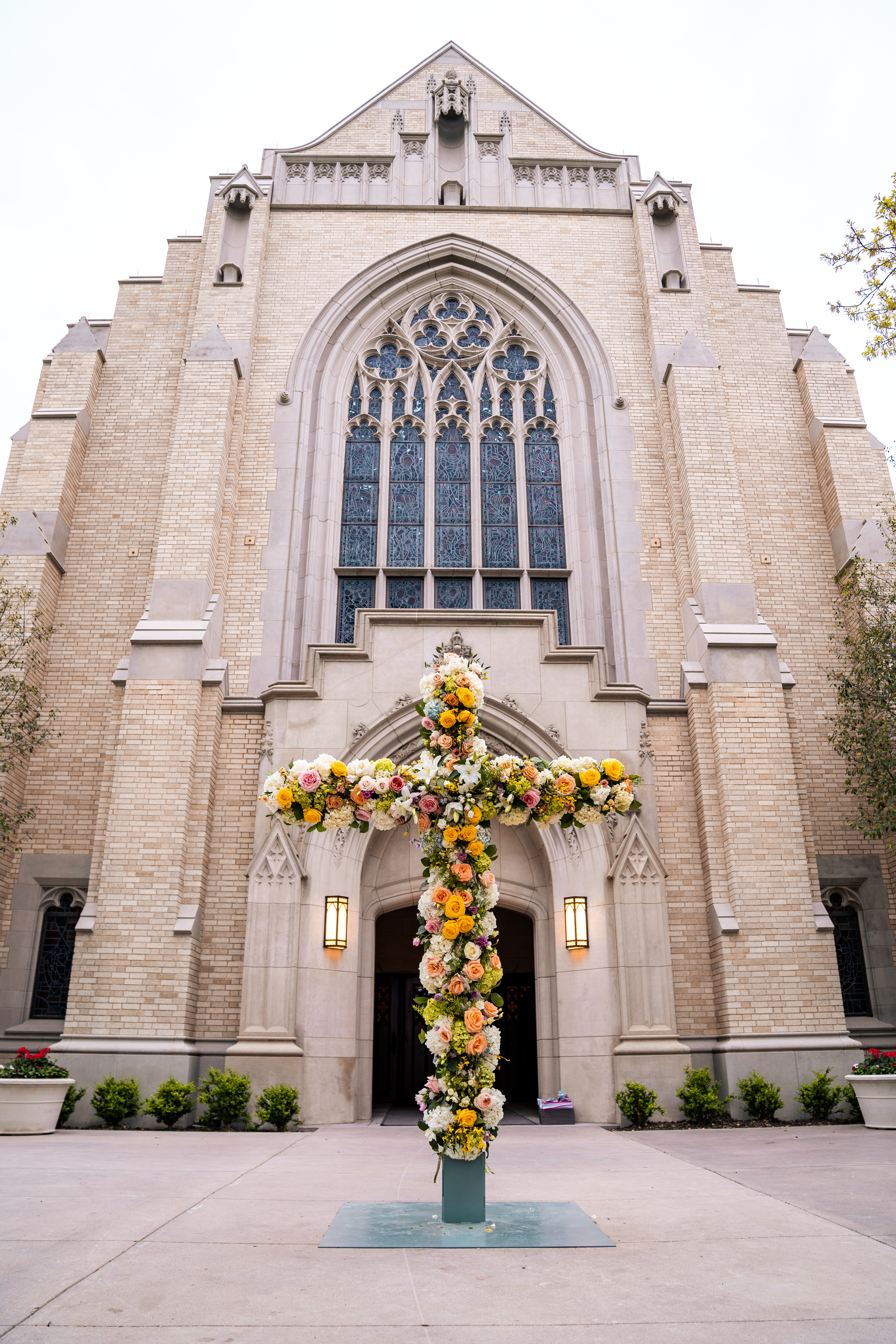
- HP Pres Easter 2021

- Location within Texas
- 32°50′40.8″N 96°47′59.6″W
- Location: 3821 University Boulevard, University Park, Texas 75205
- Country: USA
- Denomination: ECO: A Covenant Order of Evangelical Presbyterians
- Previous denomination: Presbyterian Church (U.S.A.)
- Website: hppres.org

History
- Founded: 1926
- Dedicated: 1928

Architecture
- Architect: Mark Lemmon
- Architectural type: Gothic architecture

Highland Park Presbyterian Church (HP Pres) is a Presbyterian church in University Park, Texas, with a Dallas post office address. In 2013, HP Pres voted to change its affiliation from Presbyterian Church (U.S.A.) to ECO: A Covenant Order of Evangelical Presbyterians.

== History ==
HP Pres was first established in 1926, with 290 members. The very first service was on April 11, 1926. By January 1927, Dr. W.A. Alexander of Mobile, Alabama became the first pastor. A year later, in 1928, the church building designed by architect Mark Lemmon (1889–1975) was erected. From 1932 to 1937, Dr. Thomas W. Currie, Sr. served as the new pastor; he would later serve as President of Austin Presbyterian Theological Seminary. The next pastor, Dr. Henry Wade DuBose of Spartanburg, South Carolina, served from 1938 to 1944. Dr. William M. Elliott, Jr., who came from Druid Hills Presbyterian Church in Druid Hills, Georgia, served as pastor from 1944 to 1973. Moreover, Peter Marshall (1902-1949) occasionally preached in the church. Additionally, Dr. Arthur V. Boand became the first associate minister in 1950 and Dr. Edward A. Mohns became the second associate pastor in 1954.

In 1973, Dr. B. Clayton Bell Sr., who came from the First Presbyterian Church in Rome, Georgia, became the new pastor. Further associate pastors were Dr. Sherwood M. Strodel, Dr. Thomas Tyndall, Dr. Harry S. Hassall, Thomas Foley, Thomas Cook, Gareth Icenogle, Dr. Ace L. Tubbs, Peter Barnes, Paul Peterson, William A. Watson, Jean Marie Thorndike, Russell Jonas, Robert H.Thompson, Andrew Adair, Ellen Schulz, Jeffrey Schulz, Martha Thorson, Murray Gossett, Joseph Parker, Chris Robinson, Don Riley, Max Reddick and Marshall Zieman. In 2000, Rev. Dr. Ronald W. Scates of Baltimore, Maryland became the new pastor until stepping down in 2013. The congregation was then served by Rev. Joe Rightmyer, interim Senior Pastor, until the Rev. Bryan Dunagan was called in 2014. Dunagan was senior pastor until October 26, 2023 when he died at the age of 44. From November 2023 to November 2025, Executive Pastor Rev. Jay Lee became the acting head of staff. On November 9, 2025, Rev. Dr. Thomas Daniel preached his first sermon as the next Senior Pastor.

=== Disputes with and Withdrawal from PC(USA) ===
In May 1991 HP Pres held a vote to withdraw from PC(USA). Although a simple majority voted in favor of withdrawal (2,563 voting to withdraw and 2,001 voting against), a 2/3 majority was required to withdraw, and thus (at that time) HP Pres remained within PC(USA). (A dissident group left HPPC and ultimately formed what is now Park Cities Presbyterian Church.)

The issue of withdrawal came up again in 2013; this time, the withdrawal motion passed with 89 percent approval, with a similar majority voting to affiliate with ECO. As of 2014, however, HP Pres has sought and obtained a temporary injunction against Grace Presbytery (the presbytery having oversight for all PC(USA) churches in Dallas County), prohibiting them from establishing an "administrative commission" over HP Pres.

=== Settlement and Dismissal from PC(USA) ===
On September 9, 2014, an announcement was made that Highland Park Presbyterian Church will pay $7.8 million to Grace Presbytery in order to obtain both a release of its obligations under the Presbyterian Church (U.S.A.)’s trust clause and ecclesiastical dismissal from the denomination.

The settlement agreement – which also includes an agreement between Highland Park and Grace Presbytery to send a joint letter to the members of Highland Park allowing them the opportunity to choose whether they wish to remain affiliated with the Presbyterian Church (U.S.A.) – will resolve the pending lawsuit between Grace Presbytery and Highland Park.

The lawsuit involved a dispute between Highland Park and Grace Presbytery over whether the Presbyterian Church (U.S.A.)’s trust clause, which Highland Park agreed to abide by, is legally enforceable under Texas law. Ultimately, three experts in Texas trust law retained by Grace Presbytery agreed that Highland Park’s agreement to hold its property in trust for the use and benefit of the denomination was enforceable under neutral principles of Texas law.

In an attempt to privately resolve their disagreement before trial, Highland Park and Grace Presbytery entered into a mediation process presided over by former federal Judge Jeff Kaplan on February 21 and August 25, 2014. Judge Kaplan worked to bring the parties to an agreement to resolve the case. The parties reached an agreement in principle at mediation, which obtained final approval of the parties on September 8, 2014. The $7.8 million settlement figure represents 26% of Highland Park’s “approximately thirty million dollars” of property, as alleged in Paragraph 18 of Highland Park’s amended petition filed in the lawsuit.

== Family of Churches ==
All Nations

In February 2001, All Nations was founded by the first black member of the HP Pres, Pastor Cyprian Kimathi. All Nations primary reason of establishment was to serve as a place of worship for all Africans who had immigrated to the US. It soon expanded as a place for their children as well. All Nations population has steadily increased over the years, growing from under 10 people to over a hundred. Pastor Kimathi served as pastor for many years until his retirement in 2019. Since then Pastor Simon King'ori has taken over.

Mandarin Chinese Church

In 2010, Rev. Ben Wang (originally from Beijing, China) was recruited as a Chinese pastor from Los Angeles. He is a graduate of Tsinghua University. Ben helped launch the Mandarin Chinese Church in April 2011.

Peak Street Church

Cameron Beaty serves as lead church planter of Peak Street Church. He is passionate about seeing the good news of Jesus transform people and places to life as God always intended it. Cameron holds a Masters of Divinity from Gordon-Conwell Theological Seminary. Peak Street was planted in 2018 and meets in Old East Dallas.

Grace Church Lake Highlands

Charlie Dunn serves as lead pastor at Grace Church. He holds a Masters of Divinity from Redeemer Seminary, and a Doctorate of Ministry from Duke University. The church was planted in 2021 and meets in Lake Highlands.

Good Shepherd Oak Cliff

Good Shepherd is a Jesus-focused, gospel-centered, community-oriented, and mission-driven church. Andrew Franklin serves as the lead church planter of GSOC. He sensed God’s invitation to plant a new church in the neighborhood they call home, and in October 2022, Andrew held their first worship service at the Cliff House.

== Highland Park Presbyterian Church senior pastors ==
Highland Park Presbyterian Church senior pastors
Senior pastor	Years	Ref.
Dr. W.A. Alexander	1927–1932	
Dr. Thomas W. Currie, Sr.	1932–1937	
Dr. Henry Wade DuBose	1938–1944	
Dr. William M. Elliott, Jr.	1944–1973	
Dr. B. Clayton Bell Sr.	1973–1999	
Rev. Dr. Ronald W. Scates	2000–2013	
Rev. Joe Rightmyer (interim)	2013–2014	
Rev. Bryan Dunagan	2014–2023	
Rev. Dr. Thomas Daniel	2025–present	

== Bibliography ==
- History of the Highland Park Presbyterian Church, Dallas, Texas, 1926-1967 (1967)
- The First Fifty Years: Highland Park Presbyterian Church, Dallas, Texas, 1926-1976
