= Mark Lemmon =

American architect

- Born: 1889
- Died: 1975 (aged 85–86)
- Education: University of Texas at Austin; Massachusetts Institute of Technology
- Occupation: architect
- Spouse: Maybelle Reynolds
- Children: 2
- Parent(s): William Leonard; Cosette (Libscomb) Lemmon

Mark Lemmon (1889–1975) was an American architect from Dallas, Texas.

== Biography ==
=== Early life ===
Mark Lemmon was born in Gainesville, Texas, in 1889. His father was William Leonard and his mother, Cosette (Libscomb) Lemmon. He moved to Sherman, Texas, with his family when he was eight years old. He graduated from the University of Texas at Austin with a Bachelor of Science in Geology in 1912 and received another bachelor's degree in Architecture and Engineering from the Massachusetts Institute of Technology in Cambridge, Massachusetts, in 1916. He served in France during the First World War.

=== Career ===
He worked for the New York City-based architectural firm Warren and Wetmore, where he focused on The Commodore Hotel in New York City and The Broadmoor in Colorado Springs, Colorado.

He moved to Dallas and worked for Hal Thompson until 1921. He then partnered with Roscoe DeWitt (1894-1975) until 1927. During that period of time, they designed the Sunset High School, the Woodrow Wilson High School, some buildings on the campus of Southern Methodist University, and the Highland Park United Methodist Church.

From 1927 to 1940, he designed the Highland Park Presbyterian Church, public schools in Port Arthur, Marshall, Longview, Terrell, Grand Prairie and Sherman. Additionally, he also designed the Cotton Bowl, and the Third Church of Christ, Scientist. Later, he also designed the Tower Petroleum Building, the Boude Storey Junior High School, and the Alex Spence Junior High School. He also designed the Cokesbury Bookstore, which hosted book signings by F. Scott Fitzgerald, John Steinbeck, William Faulkner and Howard Cosell; however, it was demolished in 1993. In the mid-1930s, he went on to design the Museum of Natural History and the Hall of State.

He was a consulting architect for the Dallas Independent School District from 1945 to 1968. Moreover, from 1948 to 1959, he also designed eighteen Georgian-style buildings on the campus of Southern Methodist University, including the Fondren Science Building and the Perkins Chapel. He also designed buildings for the University of Texas at Austin, Galveston and Dallas. He designed the now demolished original building of Hyer Elementary School for Highland Park Independent School District. Lemmon also designed the campus and the many additions of Preston Hollow Presbyterian Church in the Preston Hollow neighborhood of Dallas, TX. The building is wonderfully preserved and is a prime example of Lemmon’s Georgian style buildings.

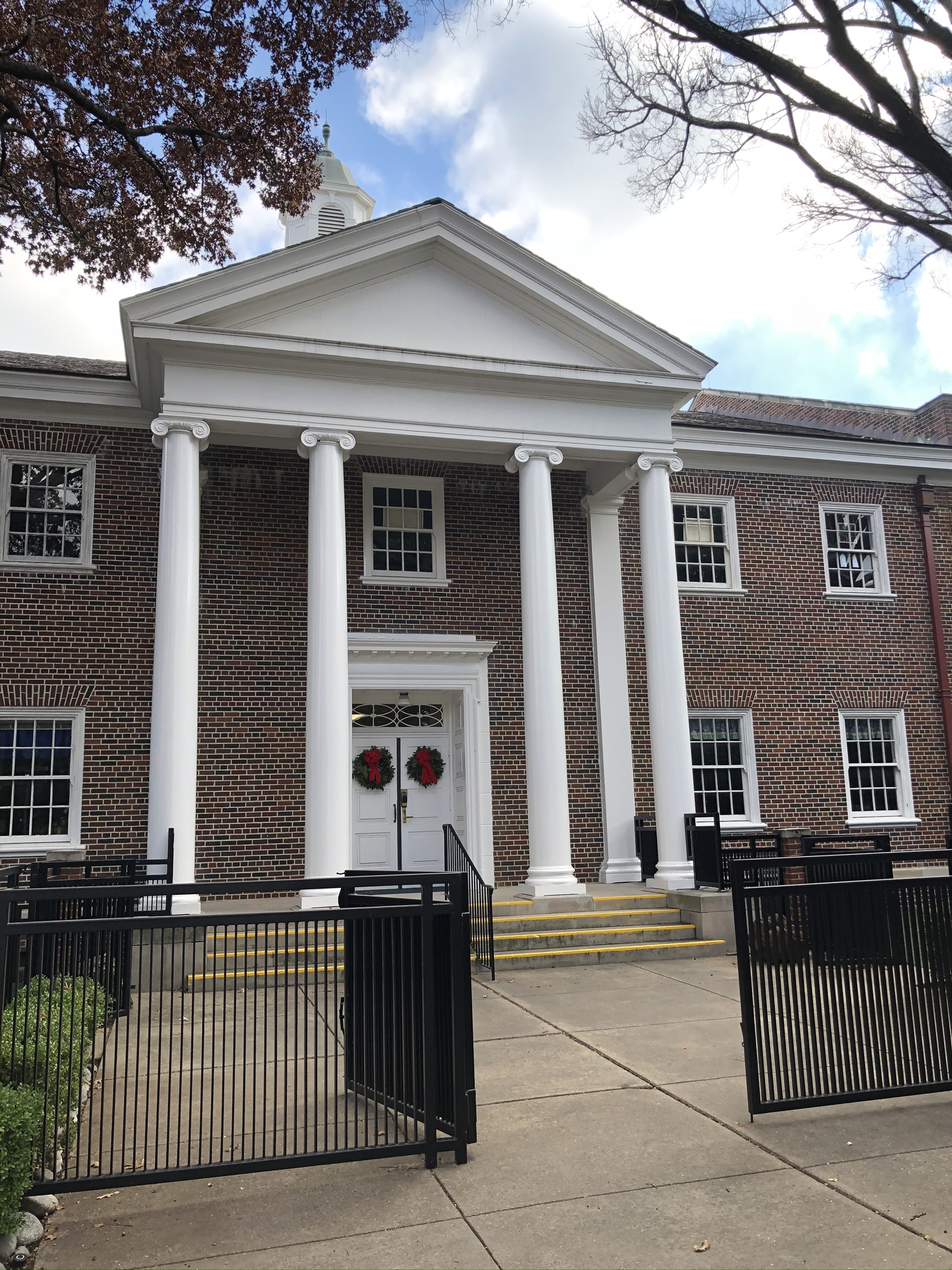
The outside of Preston Hollow Presbyterian Church in Dallas, TX

He was a member of the Texas Philosophical Society, the Dallas Historical Society, the City Club Dallas, the Idlewild Club and the American Legion.

=== Personal life ===
He married Maybelle Reynolds on November 14, 1922. They had two sons. He died on December 22, 1975, in Dallas, Texas, where he was buried in the Hillcrest Mausoleum.

== Bibliography ==
=== Secondary sources ===
- Richard R. Brettell, Willis Winters, Crafting Traditions: The Architecture of Mark Lemmon, Dallas, Texas: Southern Methodist University Press, 2005.
