= Roscoe DeWitt =

American architect

Roscoe DeWitt F.A.I.A.
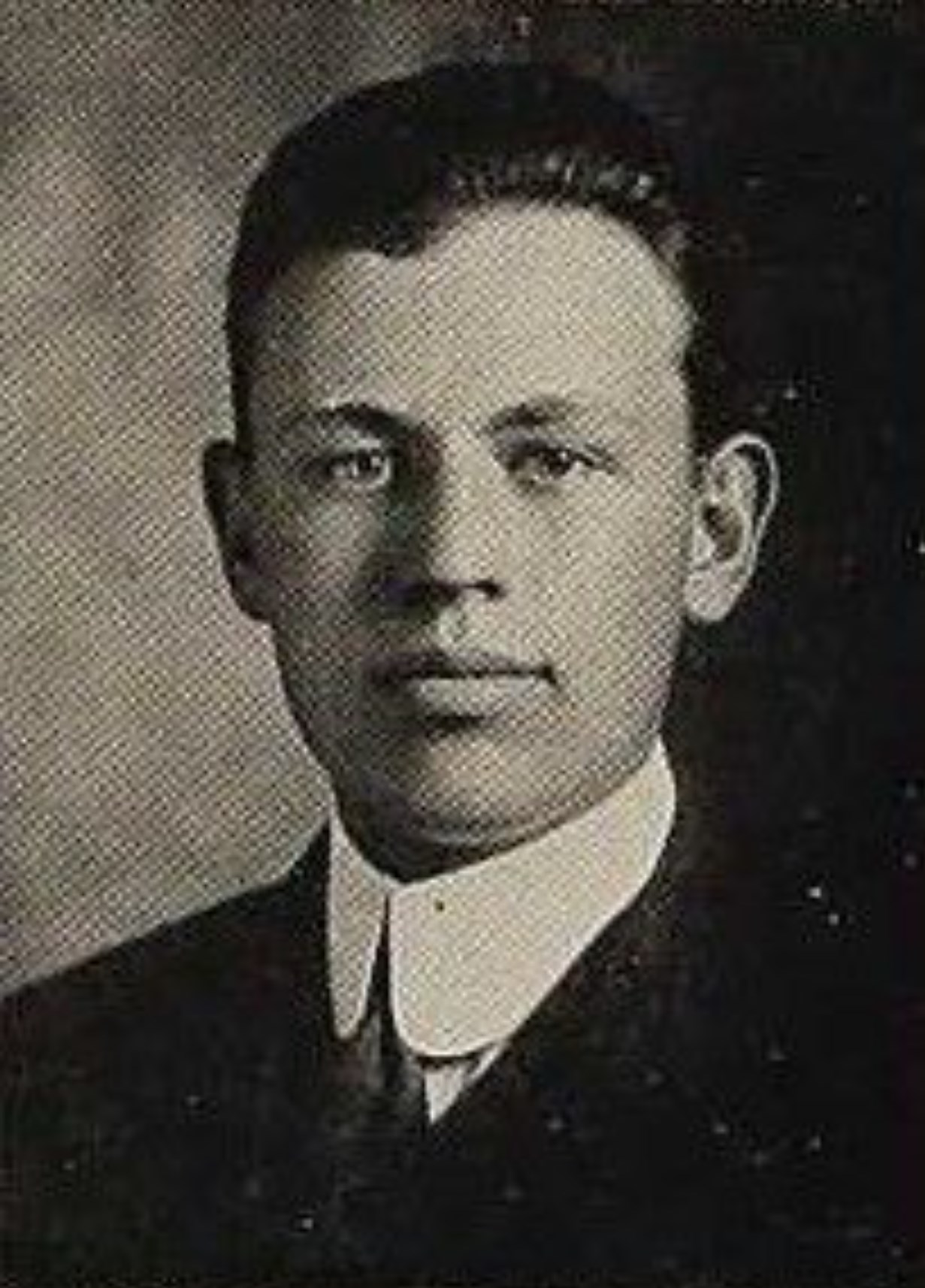
- DeWitt in 1914
- Born: Roscoe Plimpton DeWitt; February 18, 1894; Dallas, Texas, U.S.
- Died: November 2, 1975 (aged 81); Dallas, Texas, U.S.
- Burial place: Sparkman-Hillcrest Memorial Park Cemetery
- Education: Dartmouth College; Harvard University
- Occupation: architect

Roscoe DeWitt F.A.I.A. (February 18, 1894 – November 2, 1975) was an American architect. He designed many buildings in Texas, including houses, libraries, hospitals, schools, churches and several buildings on the campus of Southern Methodist University.

== Early life ==
Roscoe Plimpton DeWitt was born February 18, 1894, in Dallas, Texas. He was the first student enrolled at the Terrill School for Boys, graduating in 1910; Terrill eventually became St. Mark's School of Texas. DeWitt graduated from Dartmouth College in 1914 and received a Masters of Architecture from Harvard University in 1917.

== Military ==
During the First World War, DeWitt served as a captain in the United States Army Coast Artillery Corps. During the Second World War, he served as a major in the Monuments, Fine Arts, and Archives program, safeguarding historical buildings in the French countryside. Their efforts were described in the book, Monuments Men.

== Architecture ==
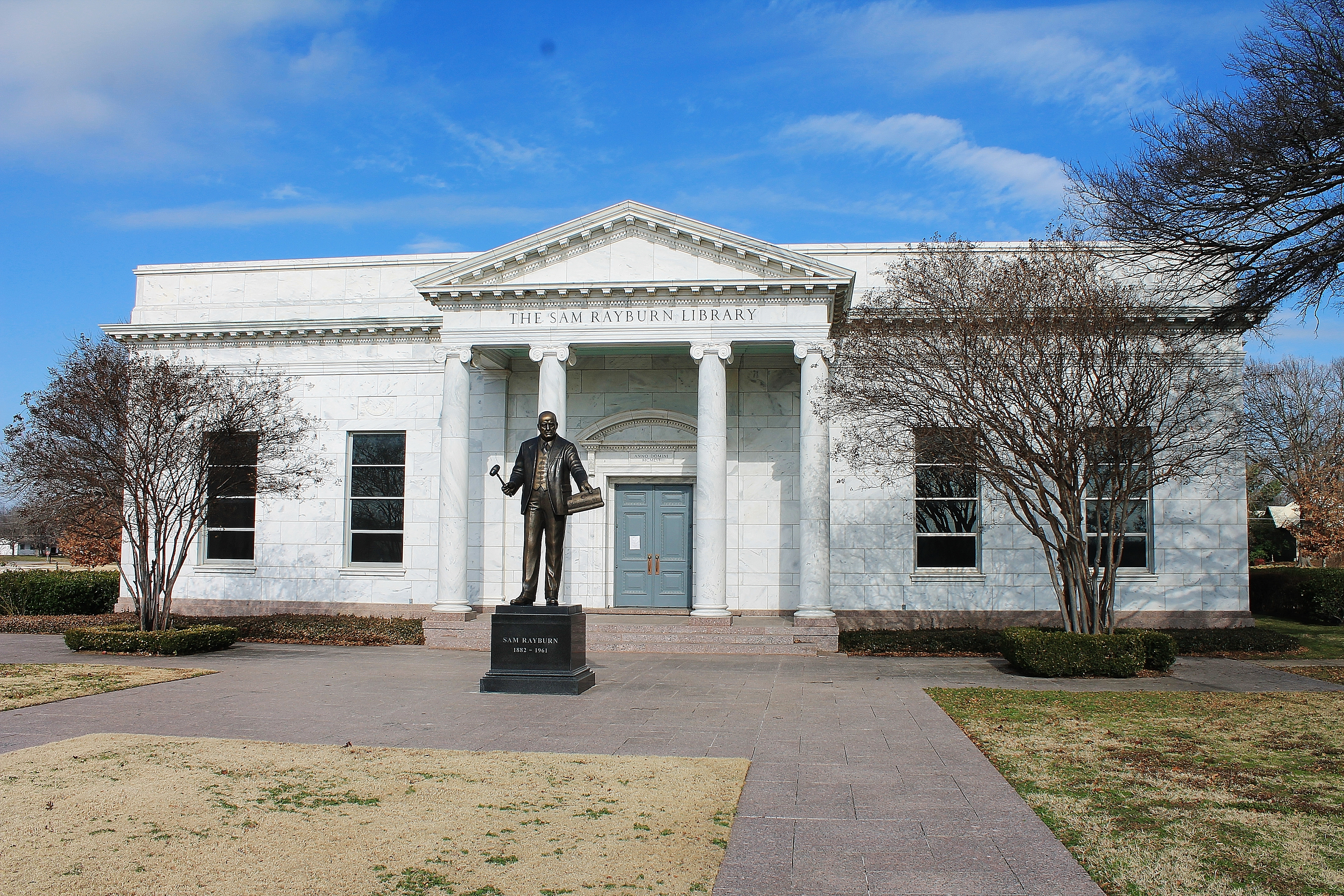
The Sam Rayburn Library and Museum, designed by DeWitt.

DeWitt designed the hospital in Marshall, Texas, in 1927. He designed the Sam Rayburn Library and Museum in Bonham, Texas, in the Classical Revival architectural style in 1955. In the latter part of his career, DeWitt helped restore the original Senate and Supreme Court buildings and the James Madison Memorial Building of the Library of Congress in Washington, D.C. He also helped design the Dallas neighborhood of Wynnewood, under the direction of businessman Angus G. Wynne.

Together with Mark Lemmon, DeWitt designed the Sunset High School, the Woodrow Wilson High School, some buildings on the campus of Southern Methodist University, and the Highland Park United Methodist Church in Dallas.

Together with Arch Berry Swank Jr., DeWitt designed buildings of the Parkland Memorial Hospital, two Neiman Marcus stores, Stanley Marcus's private residence, all in Dallas. Additionally, in Jacksonville, Florida, they designed the St. Vincent's Medical Center.

== Affiliations ==
DeWitt served on the Boards of Directors of the Dallas Opera and on the Advisory Board for the Texas Commission on Arts and Humanities. Additionally, he was a member of the Dallas Historical Society, the Texas Philosophical Society, the Royal Society of Arts, the American Federation of Arts, the Harvard Club of New York City, and Cosmos Club, a gentlemen's club in Washington, D.C.

DeWitt was elected a Fellow of the American Institute of Architects, and was president of the institute's Texas and Dallas chapters.

== Death ==
DeWitt died on November 2, 1975, in Dallas, at age 81.
