= Southern Methodist University =

Private research university in University Park, Texas, US

- Motto: Latin: Veritas liberabit vos
- Motto in English: "The truth will set you free"
- Type: Private research university
- Established: April 17, 1911; 115 years ago
- Accreditation: SACS
- Religious affiliation: United Methodist Church
- Academic affiliations: IAMSCU; NAICU; ORAU; URA
- Endowment: $2.7 billion
- Budget: $923.0 million (FY2025)
- President: Jay Hartzell
- Provost: Rachel Davis Mersey
- Faculty: 1,163 (fall 2024)
- Total staff: 3,037 (fall 2024)
- Students: 12,544 (fall 2025)
- Undergraduates: 7,545 (fall 2025)
- Postgraduates: 4,999 (fall 2025)
- Location: University Park, Texas, United States; 32.83855°N 96.78294°W
- Campus: 234 acres (0.95 km^{2}); Urban enclave
- Other campuses: Taos
- Newspaper: The Daily Campus
- Colors: Red and blue
- Nickname: Mustangs
- Sporting affiliations: NCAA Division I FBS – ACC; ECAC
- Mascot: Peruna
- Website: smu.edu

Southern Methodist University (SMU) is a private research university in University Park, Texas, United States, with a satellite campus in Taos County, New Mexico. SMU was founded in 1911 by the Methodist Episcopal Church, South—now part of the United Methodist Church—in partnership with Dallas civic leaders. It is currently non-sectarian in its teaching and enrolls students of all religious affiliations. It is classified among "R1: Doctoral Universities – Very high research spending and doctorate production".

As of fall 2025, the university had 12,544 students, including 7,545 undergraduates and 4,999 postgraduates. As of fall 2024, its instructional faculty was 1,163 members, with 788 being full-time.

In the 2020 academic year, the university granted over 3,827 degrees, including 315 doctoral, 1,659 master's, and 1,853 bachelor's degrees. Graduate degrees are offered in eight schools: the Edwin L. Cox School of Business, the Dedman College of Humanities and Sciences, the Dedman School of Law, the Bobby B. Lyle School of Engineering, the Algur H. Meadows School of the Arts, the Moody School of Graduate and Advanced Studies, Perkins School of Theology, and the Annette Caldwell Simmons School of Education and Human Development.

== History ==
The university was chartered on April 17, 1911, by the southern denomination of the Methodist Episcopal Church. At the time of the charter, church leaders saw a need to establish a Methodist institution within a metropolitan area. Originally, this new institution was intended to be created in Fort Worth through a merger between Polytechnic College (now Texas Wesleyan University) and Southwestern University. However, the church's education commission instead opted to create a new institution in Dallas to serve this purpose after extensive lobbying by the Dallas Chamber of Commerce. Robert Stewart Hyer, previously president of Southwestern University, was appointed as the first president of the new university.

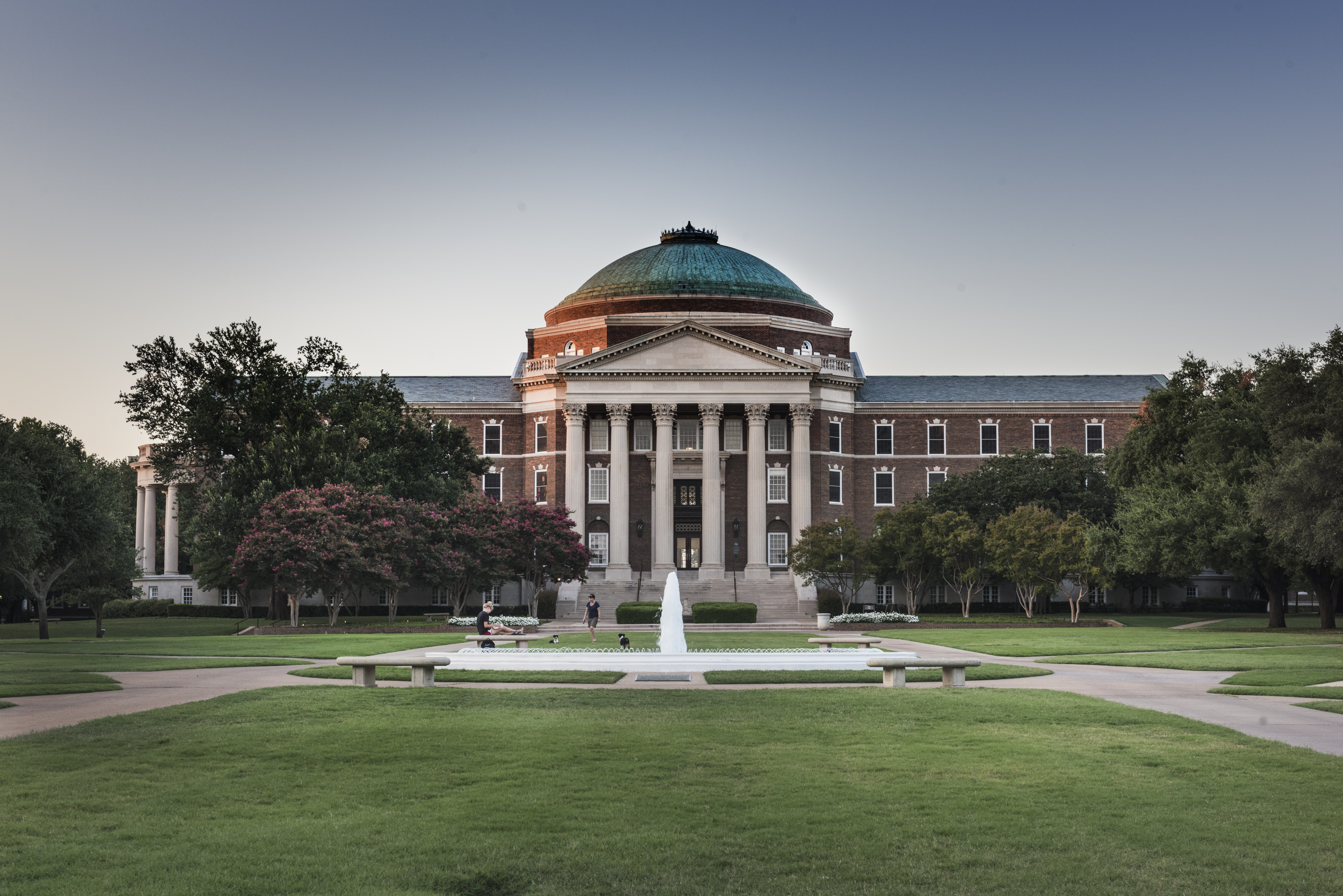
Constructed in 1915, Dallas Hall remains the centerpiece of the campus.

The effort to establish a new university in Dallas drew the attention of the General Conference of the Methodist Church, which was seeking to create a new connectional institution in the wake of a 1914 Tennessee Supreme Court decision stripping the church of authority at Vanderbilt University. The church decided to support the establishment of the new institution while also increasing the size of Emory University at a new location in DeKalb County, Georgia. At the 1914 meeting of the General Conference, Southern Methodist University was designated the connectional institution for all conferences west of the Mississippi River.

SMU named its first building Dallas Hall in gratitude for the support of Dallas leaders and local citizens, who had pledged $300,000 to secure the university's location. It remains the university's symbol and centerpiece, and it inspired "the Hilltop" as a nickname for the school. It was designed by Shepley, Rutan and Coolidge after the Rotunda at the University of Virginia. Dallas Hall opened its doors in 1915 and housed the entire university along with a bank and a barbershop. The hall is registered in the National Register of Historic Places.

Robert Stewart Hyer, physics professor and first president of Southern Methodist University

Classes were planned to officially begin in 1913, but construction delays on the university's first building prevented classes from starting until 1915. In the interim, the only functioning academic department at SMU was the medical college it had acquired from Southwestern University.

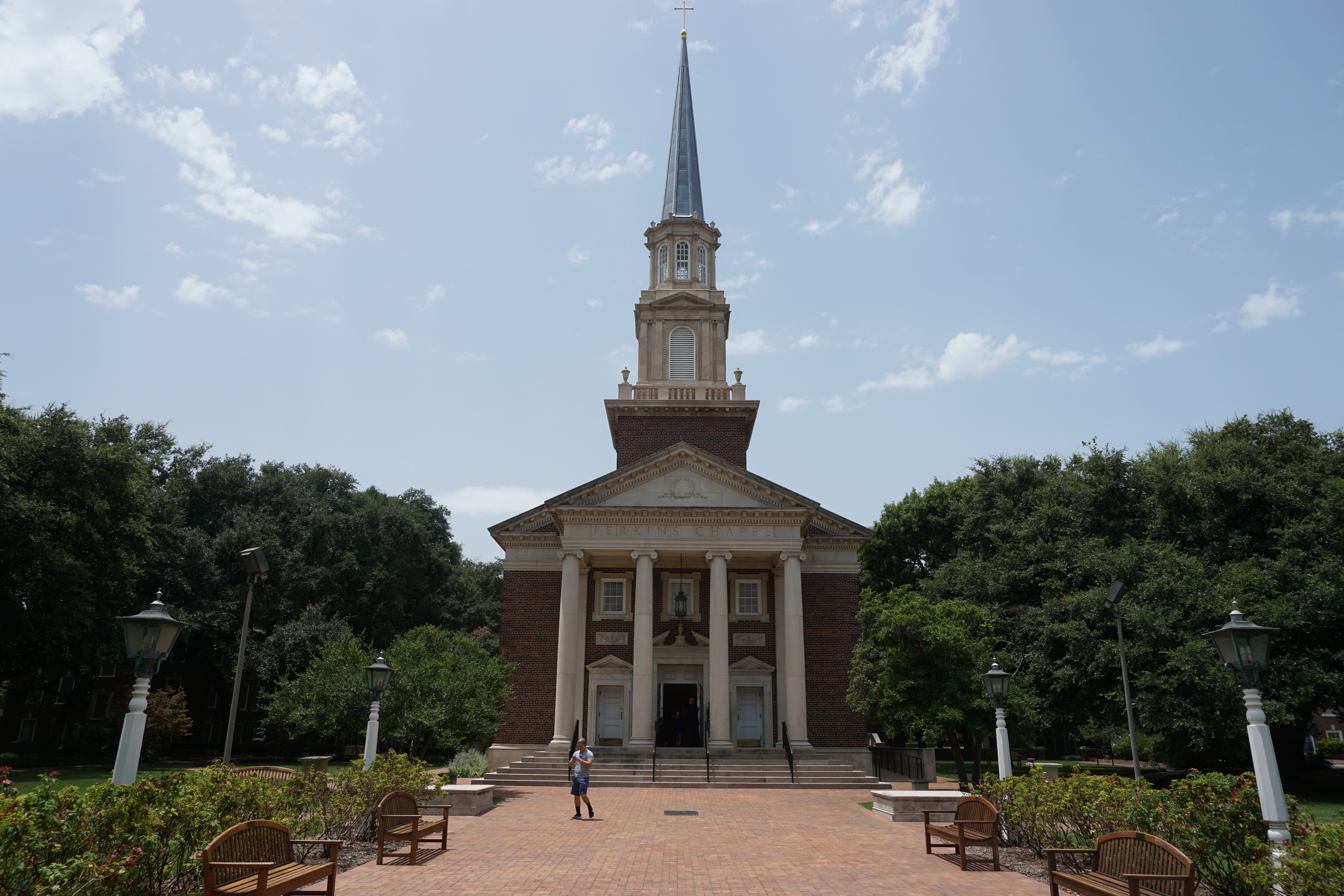
Perkins Chapel serves as the primary worship setting for Perkins School of Theology.

As the first president of Southern Methodist University, Hyer selected Harvard crimson and Yale blue as the school colors in order to associate SMU with the high standards of Ivy League universities. Several streets in University Park and adjacent Highland Park were named after prominent universities.

In 1927, Highland Park United Methodist Church, designed by architects Mark Lemmon and Roscoe DeWitt, was erected on campus.

During World War II, SMU was one of 131 colleges and universities nationally that took part in the V-12 Navy College Training Program which offered students a path to a Navy commission.

In 1987, the university football program's repeated, flagrant recruiting violations led to the NCAA administering what is called the death penalty against the program. The punishment included cancellation of the 1987 football season, most of the 1988 season, and a two-year ban from Bowl Games and televised sports coverage.

On February 22, 2008, the university trustees unanimously instructed university president R. Gerald Turner to enter into an agreement to establish the George W. Bush Presidential Center on 23 acres on the southeast side of the campus. The center, which includes a presidential library, museum, institute, and the offices of the George W. Bush Foundation, was dedicated on April 25, 2013, in a ceremony which featured all living former U.S. Presidents Jimmy Carter, George H. W. Bush, Bill Clinton, George W. Bush, and then-incumbent U.S. president, Barack Obama. The library and museum are privately administered by the National Archives and Records Administration, while the university holds representation on the independent public policy institute board. The project raised over $500 million for the construction and endowment of the George W. Bush presidential center, which has a 249-year ground lease from SMU, with extensions, and operates completely separate from SMU.

=== Split from the United Methodist Church ===
In light of the turmoil within the Methodist Church over what it described as "fundamental differences" over LGBTQ policies, the university's trustees decided to separate the university from control of the church. In November 2019, the SMU board filed with the state of Texas amended articles of incorporation that eliminated the United Methodist Church's rights as listed in the 1996 articles. The amendment made it clear that SMU is solely maintained and controlled by its board as the ultimate authority for the university and removed an overarching statement that the school would be "owned, maintained and controlled by the South Central Jurisdictional Conference." Within a month, the church filed a lawsuit alleging that the trustees of SMU have no authority to amend the Articles of Incorporation without the prior approval and authorization of SCJC. In March 2021, Dallas County judge ruled in favor of Southern Methodist University in the lawsuit.

In June 2025, the Supreme Court of Texas reversed a lower court's ruling, allowing the church's lawsuit to proceed and finding that the 1996 articles created a "meaningful right of control" for the denomination. On March 18, 2026, the university and the SCJC announced a comprehensive settlement to end the legal dispute. Under the agreement, SMU filed newly amended articles of incorporation that restored the church's historical oversight and governance rights, ensuring the university remains a church-affiliated institution.

=== Historical Plano campus ===
From 1997 to 2020 Southern Methodist University operated a small campus, consisting of 16 acres and 4 buildings, in Plano, Texas, in Legacy Business Park. This campus hosted SMU's video game design school, SMU Guildhall, and other graduate-level programs. After the university sold the Plano campus to a developer in 2019, SMU Guildhall and all other programs housed there moved onto the main Dallas campus in the new Gerald J. Ford Hall for Research and Innovation on December 4, 2020.

== Organization and resources ==
=== Institutional organization ===
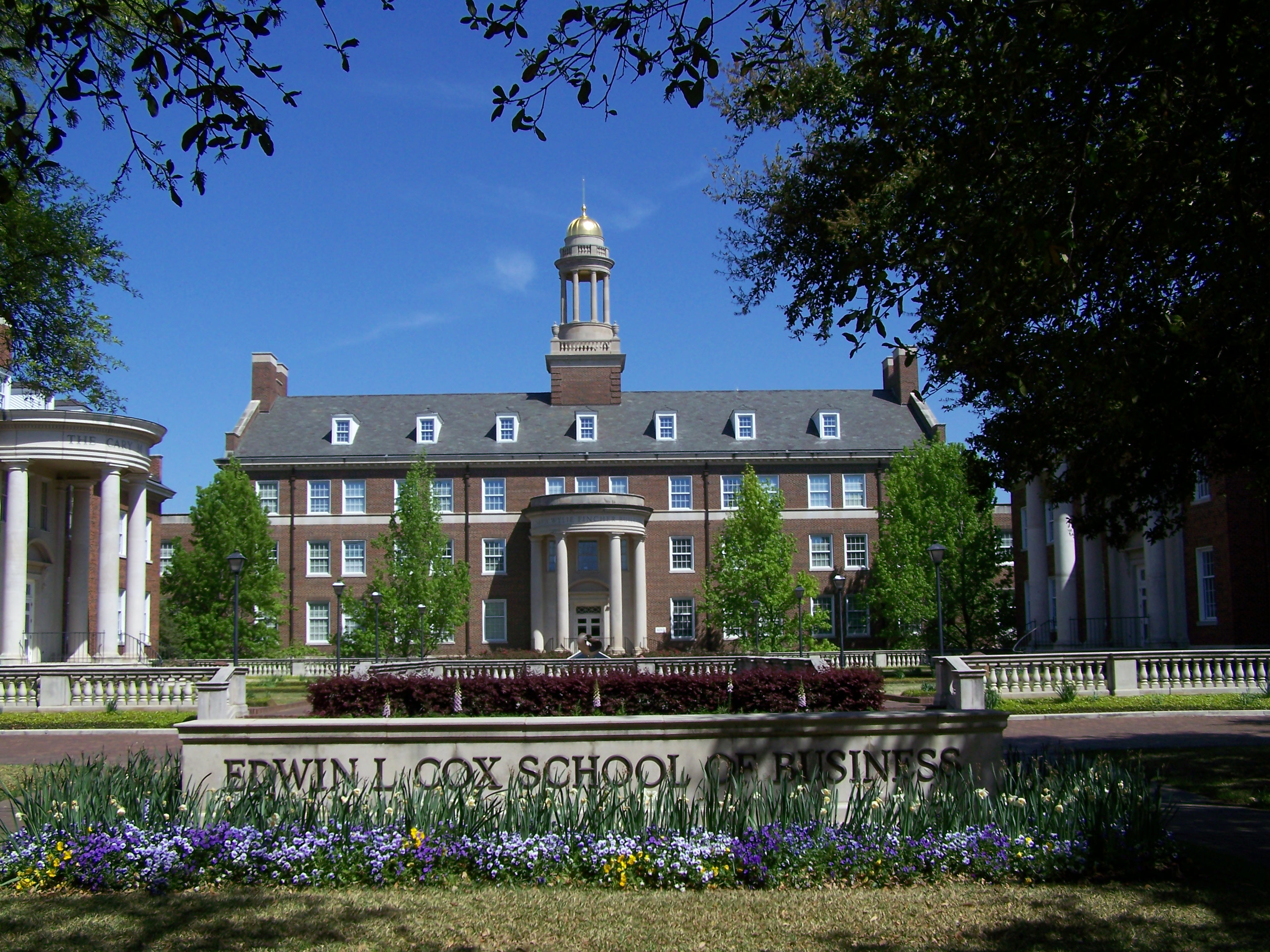
The Cox School of Business

SMU has eight degree-granting schools each headed by a dean, with all undergraduates entering the university in the Dedman College of Humanities and Sciences as pre-majors:

- Cox School of Business
- Dedman College of Humanities and Sciences
- Dedman School of Law
- Lyle School of Engineering
- Meadows School of the Arts
- Moody School of Graduate and Advanced Studies
- Perkins School of Theology
- Simmons School of Education and Human Development

=== Endowment and financial resources ===
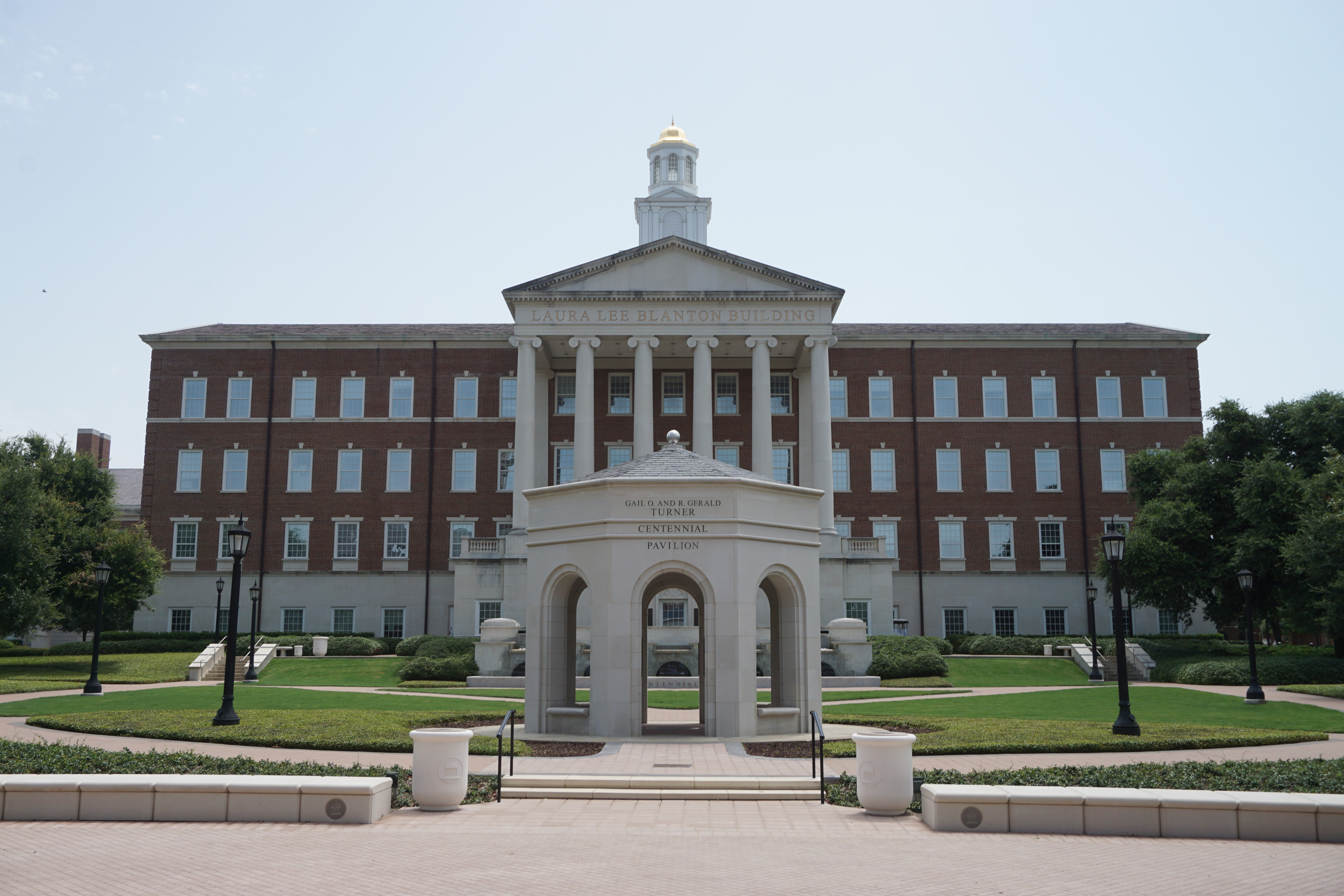
The Laura Lee Blanton Student Services Building, with the Centennial Quadrangle in the foreground

Southern Methodist University's 2019 endowment of $1.664 billion ranked 67th largest among the endowments of colleges and universities in the United States and Canada, and it was one of only 110 institutions with an endowment greater than $1 billion as of June 30, 2019.

The university's endowment surpassed $2 billion for the first time in the university's history in 2021, having previously surpassed $1 billion in 2005.

On February 26, 2016, SMU announced that through its "Second Century Centennial Campaign" which concluded on December 31, 2015, had raised $1.15 billion, the largest fundraising campaign of any institution in North Texas's history, the largest total for a private Texas university, and the fourth largest of any university in Texas. The Centennial Campaign, coinciding with the 100-year anniversary of the university's founding in 1911 and opening in 1915 also made SMU one of only 34 private colleges and universities in the United States to complete a campaign of $1 billion or more.

Its previous fundraising campaign, "A Time to Lead", which concluded in April 2002 and raised $542 million was the largest fundraising campaign in the school's history at the time. Under R. Gerald Turner's leadership and through two successive campaigns in under 20 years, SMU has received well over $1.6 billion in commitments in support of institutional priorities.

By 1986, as the university neared the 75th anniversary of its founding, SMU's endowment had grown from $60 million a decade earlier in 1976 to nearly $325 million, at the time the 27th largest in the country. The previous "The Design for the Third Generation" fundraising campaign, which concluded in May 1983 raised nearly $120 million in gifts and pledges.

== Campuses ==
=== Main campus ===
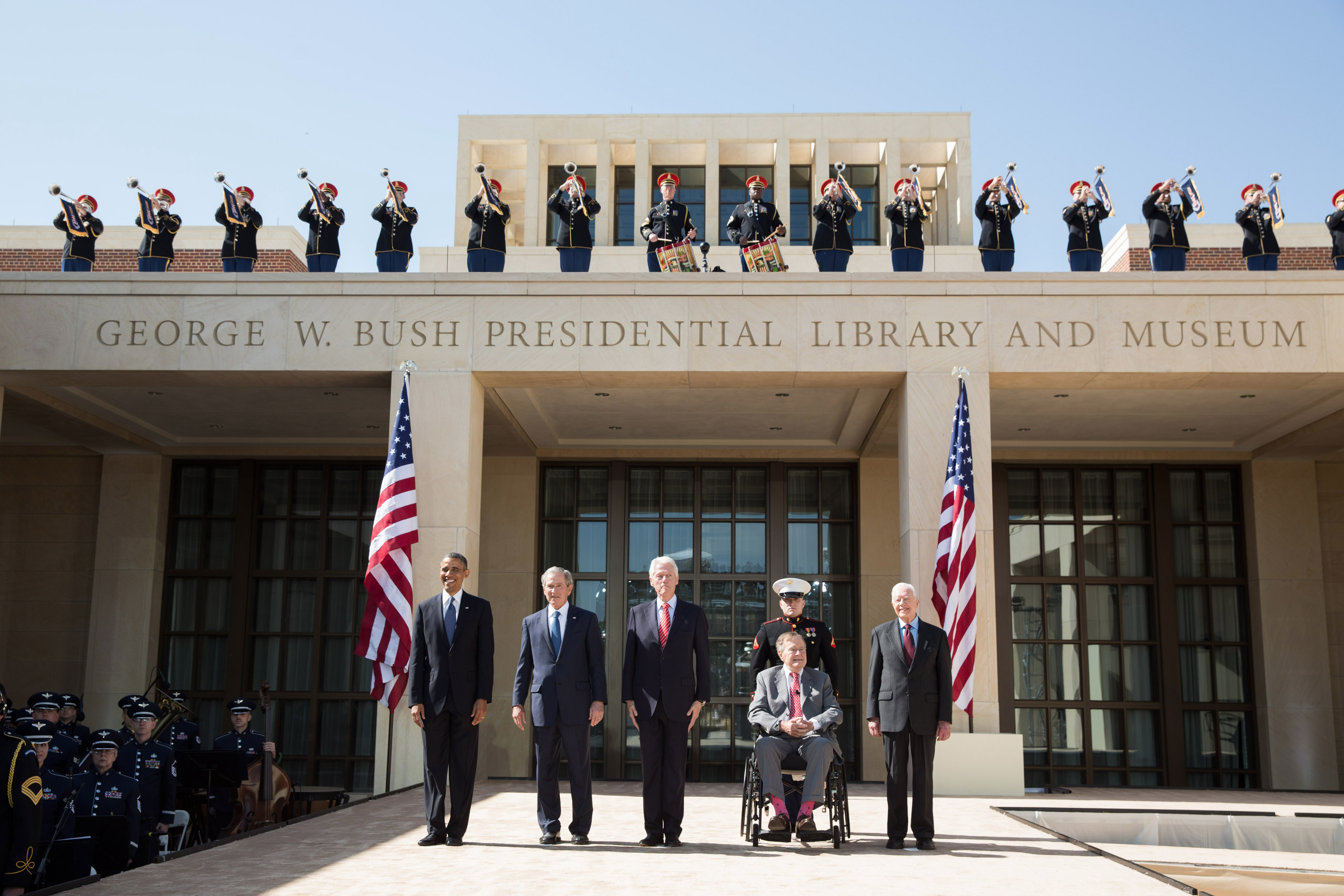
The main campus hosts the George W. Bush Presidential Center, seen here during the dedication attended by five living US presidents.

The main campus of Southern Methodist University is mostly located in University Park, a municipality in Dallas County, Texas. The campus extends into the Dallas city limits, and into the city limits of Highland Park. It is located on 234 acres of land just west of US Route 75. Dallas Hall is the centerpiece for this campus and is the administrative center for the Dedman College of Humanities and Sciences.

Most of the campus is centered around Bishop Boulevard, an elongated, tree-lined loop road that also serves as the site for "Boulevarding", SMU's version of the tailgating seen on many American college campuses. The campus was ranked as the most beautiful campus in America by Condé Nast Traveler in 2016 and also hosts the George W. Bush Presidential Center on the east side of the campus.

=== Taos campus ===
Since 1973, the university has owned a 423-acre campus located at Fort Burgwin, just outside of Taos, New Mexico. This campus hosts classes during intersessions between semesters and during the summer. Along with the normal academic courses offered at the site, students attending classes at this campus during the winter can opt to attend wellness classes centered around winter sports. Other courses offered at this campus are sometimes adjusted to utilize the surrounding environment, such as a course in field botany offered during some summers.

== Academics ==
=== Undergraduate admissions ===
For the class of 2024 (entering Fall 2020), 14,010 students applied, 7,379 (52.7%) were admitted, and 1,531 enrolled/matriculated (20.7%) – including 758 women and 773 men, and the 1 year retention rate (entering Fall 2019) was 92%. The average SAT was 1,343 while the average ACT was 30.6. The middle 50% SAT range for enrolled students was 630–710 for Evidence-Based Reading & Writing, 620–740 for math, while the ACT Composite range was 29–33.

=== University Honors Program ===
First-year undergraduate students admitted to SMU are automatically reviewed for admissions into the highly selective University Honors Program (UHP). Generally, first-year students that rank in the top 10% of their incoming class will receive a formal invitation to join the UHP. Students that do not receive an invitation must have completed at least one full-time semester on campus with a cumulative GPA of 3.5 or higher before formally applying for admissions. The University Honors Program is a liberal arts honors experience that serves to supplement the basic SMU University Curriculum. Students are required to take honors courses throughout their time at SMU, and the program culminates with a final senior project or experience. Each student's experience can be unique, and students are encouraged to pursue projects in their area of study or about their passions.

=== Reputation and rankings ===
Academic rankings

National
- Forbes: 103
- U.S. News & World Report: 88 (tie)
- Washington Monthly: 977
- WSJ/College Pulse: 275

Global
- ARWU: 701–800
- QS: 1,001–1,200
- U.S. News & World Report: 877 (tie)

USNWR graduate school rankings
Type	Rank
Biological Sciences	186 (tie)
Business	34
Chemistry	136 (tie)
Clinical Psychology	115 (tie)
Computer Science	120 (tie)
Earth Sciences	70 (tie)
Economics	60
Education	49 (tie)
Engineering	160 (tie)
English	90 (tie)
Fine Arts	135 (tie)
History	86 (tie)
Law	43 (tie)
Mathematics	103 (tie)
Physics	136 (tie)
Psychology	165 (tie)
Statistics	54 (tie)

In the 2025 edition of the U.S. News & World Report college rankings, SMU was tied for 88th in the rankings of "national universities". U.S. News & World Report ranked the Dedman School of Law tied for 43rd in the U.S. for 2025.

In the 2025 edition, SMU was ranked 103rd by Forbes.

=== Research centers, institutes and related facilities ===
Among the university's research centers, institutes and related facilities are:

- AT&T Center for Virtualization: housed within the SMU Lyle School of Engineering.
- Bridwell Institute for Economic Freedom
- Cary M. Maguire Center for Ethics and Public Responsibility
- The Brierley Institute for Customer Engagement: at SMU Cox
- Darwin Deason Institute for Cyber Security: housed within the SMU Lyle School of Engineering.
- Southwestern Graduate School of Banking: based within the SMU Cox School of Business.
- Temerlin Advertising Institute: based within the SMU Meadows School of the Arts.
- John Goodwin Tower Center for Public Policy and International Affairs: Named after John Tower (MA 1953), United States Senator for Texas from 1961 to 1985.
- SMU Guildhall: The university also awards the Master of Interactive Technology (MIT) in Digital Game Development, as well as the Professional Certificate in Digital Game Development, with specializations in Art, Design, Production, and Programming – the only graduate program in the country to offer all four pillars of game development and has been ranked as the #1 Graduate Program for Game Design in the world by the Princeton Review for two years in a row.
- SMU DataArts: National Center for Arts Research
- William P. Clements Center for Southwest Studies
- O’Donnell Data Science and Research Computing Institute

=== Libraries and museums ===
==== Libraries ====
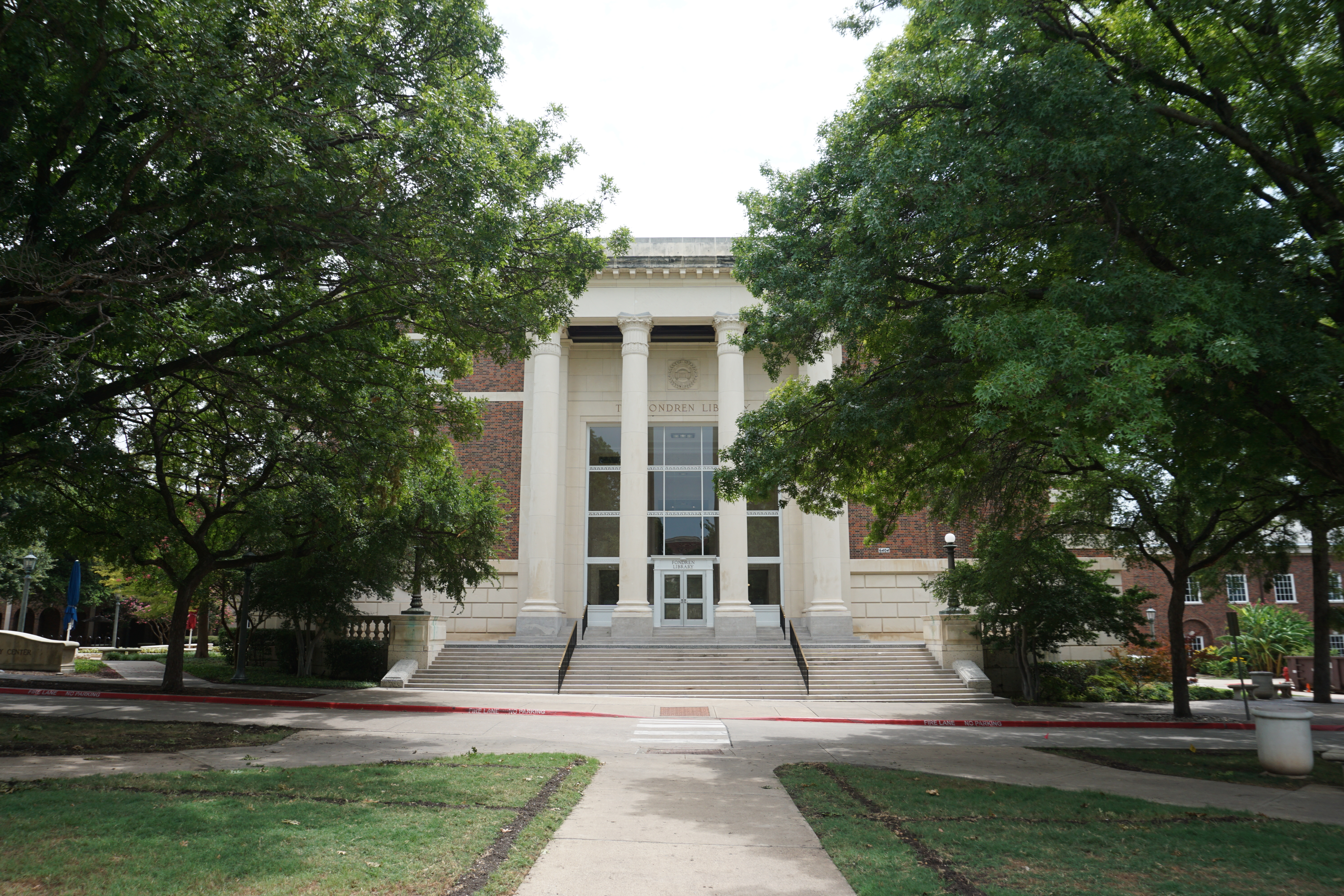
Fondren Library

- Duda Family Business Library – Business school library. The library was founded in 1987 to serve as the primary library for the Cox School of Business.
- Bridwell Library – Named for the philanthropist Joseph Sterling Bridwell of Wichita Falls, the Bridwell Library (established 1950) is one of the leading theological research collections in the United States.
- DeGolyer Library – The DeGolyer Library is the principal repository at SMU for special collections in the humanities, the history of business, and the history of science and technology. Dedicated to enhancing scholarship and teaching at SMU, the DeGolyer Library is charged with maintaining and building its various collections "for study, research, and pleasure." Established in 1957 by gifts from geophysicist Everette Lee DeGolyer, DeGolyer Library houses one of the strongest collections in the United States on the Trans-Mississippi West, Texas, the Spanish borderlands, transportation with an emphasis on railroads, and business history.
- Fondren Library – Fondren Library was built in 1940. It was the first stand-alone library and the first air-conditioned building on campus. With over two million volumes, Fondren Library houses the largest collection of resources on campus, with materials in the humanities, sciences, social sciences, engineering, and business, as well as government information resources. Fondren Library is open 24 hours, and is a common study place for students. Students have been known to call Fondren Library "Club Fondy" due to the social nature of the library. Fondren Library is also home to a Starbucks Cafe that serves faculty, staff, and students.
- Fred Wendorf Library – The Fred Wendorf Library, located on the SMU-in-Taos campus in New Mexico, contains approximately 9,768 books and small collections of journals and maps. The collections focus on archeology and the art, history, and environment of New Mexico and surrounding areas.
- Hamon Arts Library – Hamon Arts Library supports the undergraduate and graduate programs of the Meadows School of the Arts in the disciplines of art, arts administration, cinema, dance, music, and theater. The Library's circulating and reference collections contain more than 180,000 items relating to the visual and performing arts. It has particularly extensive collections in Spanish art and classical music scores and research materials. It also houses the media collections for SMU Libraries. It was built in 1990, and named after Jake and Nancy Hamon.
- Underwood Law Library – The Underwood Law Library's more than 640,000 volumes support the instruction and research of the Dedman School of Law and the general SMU community. The Library's collection is particularly strong in the areas of international law, commercial law, securities, taxation, jurisprudence, oil and gas, and air and space law.
- Rees-Jones Library of the American West – Opening in 2027, the Rees-Jones Library of the American West will house the Rees-Jones collection of Western Americana, which consists of thousands of rare books, manuscripts, photographs, maps, and other artifacts, alongside the holdings of the DeGolyer Library and its complementary special collections.

==== Publications ====
Field & Laboratory
- Discipline: Botany
- Language: English

Publication details
- History: 1932–1959
- Publisher: SMU Scholar (United States)
- Open access: Yes
- License: Creative Commons Attribution-Noncommercial 4.0

Standard abbreviations
- ISO 4: Field Lab.

Indexing
- ISSN: 0096-042X
- LCCN: sf98085275
- OCLC no.: 2008034

Links
- Journal homepage

Field & Laboratory was a scientific journal published semiannually, then quarterly, sponsored by the science departments of the university. It was established November 1, 1932, and had a total of 27 volumes. With volume 17 in 1949, quarterly publication commenced. The final issue was published in October 1959. Articles are available in PDF format at SMU Scholar, a partnership between SMU Libraries, the Office of Research and Graduate Studies, and the Office of Information Technology.

==== Museums ====
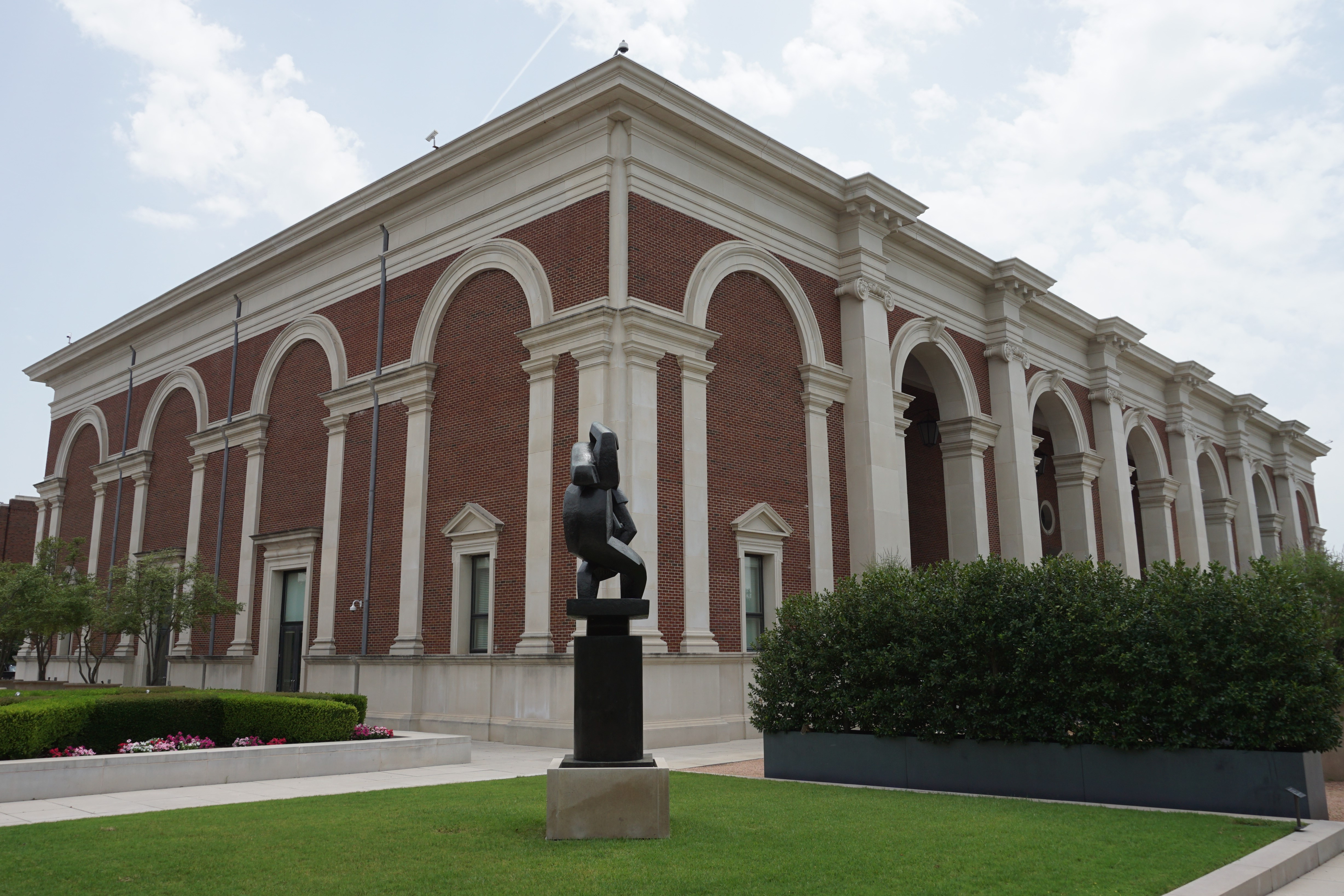
Meadows Museum

- George W. Bush Presidential Center – Located on 23 acres on the east side of the SMU main campus, the center includes a presidential library, museum, institute, and the offices of the George W. Bush Foundation. The library and museum are privately administered by the National Archives and Records Administration, while the university holds representation on the independent public policy institute board. The center serves as a resource for the study of the George W. Bush presidency and includes a full-size replica of the White House Oval Office, as it was during his presidency, together with over 43,000 artifacts, almost 70 million pages of textual materials, over 3.8 million photographs, 80 terabytes of electronic records, and over 200 million email messages.
- Meadows Museum – The Meadows Museum's collection was assembled by its founder, Algur H. Meadows. It houses several collections including a collection of Spanish art from the tenth to the 21st centuries. The museum holds different exhibits for periods of time every year. In 2018 it held the exhibition "Dali: Poetics of the Small, 1929–1936", followed by Mariano Fortuny y Masal's artwork in the "Fortuny: Friends and Followers" exhibit. This exhibit will run from February 19 to June 6. It also includes a sculpture collection including works by David Smith, Henry Moore and Claes Oldenburg, as well as by contemporary sculptors such as James Surls. Important figural sculptures by Rodin, Maillol, and Giacometti are also housed within the museum. It is also responsible for the university's art collection, including work by several important regional artists.
- Pollock Gallery – The Pollock Gallery provides an ever-changing display of works by the faculty and students of the Meadows School of the Arts, as well as by outside artists. It is located in the Hughes–Trigg Student Center.

== Student life ==
=== Student demographics ===
Student body composition as of May 2, 2022
Race and ethnicity	Total
White	63%
Hispanic	13%
Asian	8%
Foreign national	6%
Other (Note: Other consists of Multiracial Americans & those who prefer to not say.)	5%
Black	5%
Economic diversity
Low-income (Note: The percentage of students who received an income-based federal Pell grant intended for low-income students.)	9%
Affluent (Note: The percentage of students who are a part of the American middle class at the bare minimum.)	91%

As of the fall 2020 semester, the university's 12,373 students were 6,827 undergraduates and 5,546 postgraduates from all 50 states and 83 countries. The leading 10 states of origin of U.S. residents in descending order of the total undergraduate population were Texas (2,932), California (858), Florida (264), Illinois (194), Georgia (155), New York (155), Connecticut (149), Missouri (131), Tennessee (114), Arizona (98), Colorado (91), Louisiana (91), New Jersey (91), and Arkansas (84).

The university's international student population of 1,117 (9%) came from 83 countries and includes 392 undergraduate and 725 graduate students. The leading 10 countries of origin in descending order for undergraduates were China (204), Mexico (26), Canada (12), Vietnam (10), Korea (9), United Kingdom (8), Brazil (8), Australia (6), India (6), Panama (5), Spain (5), Côte d'Ivoire (4), France (4), Germany (4), Honduras (4), Taiwan (4), United Arab Emirates (4), Venezuela (4), El Salvador (3), Nigeria (3), Peru (3), and Saudi Arabia (3). In descending order for Graduate students, the countries are China (288), India (115), Saudi Arabia (49), Mexico (39), Iran (25), Korea (19), Taiwan (18), Canada (14), Italy (9) and South Africa (8)

31.4% of the student body were members of a minority group, while female students constituted 49% of the undergraduate and 48% of the graduate student populations, respectively. SMU's student-faculty ratio was 11:1. The average age of undergraduate students was 20, while that of graduate and professional students was 30 and the total average student age was 25.

Among students who reported a religious affiliation, 25% were Catholic, 13% were Methodist, 38% were from other Protestant denominations, and 15% were from other religions including Judaism and Hinduism.

=== Undergraduate housing ===
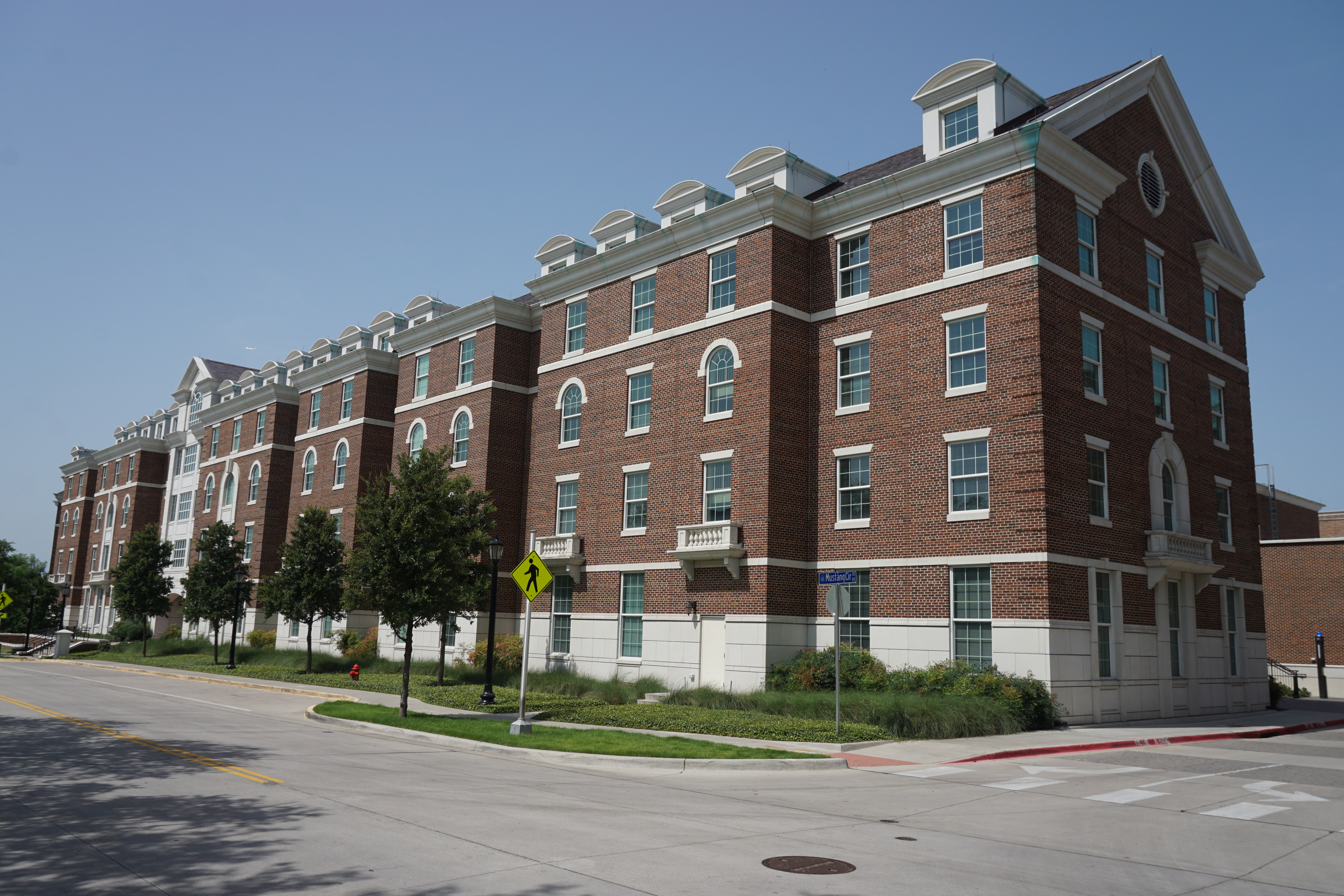
Loyd Commons

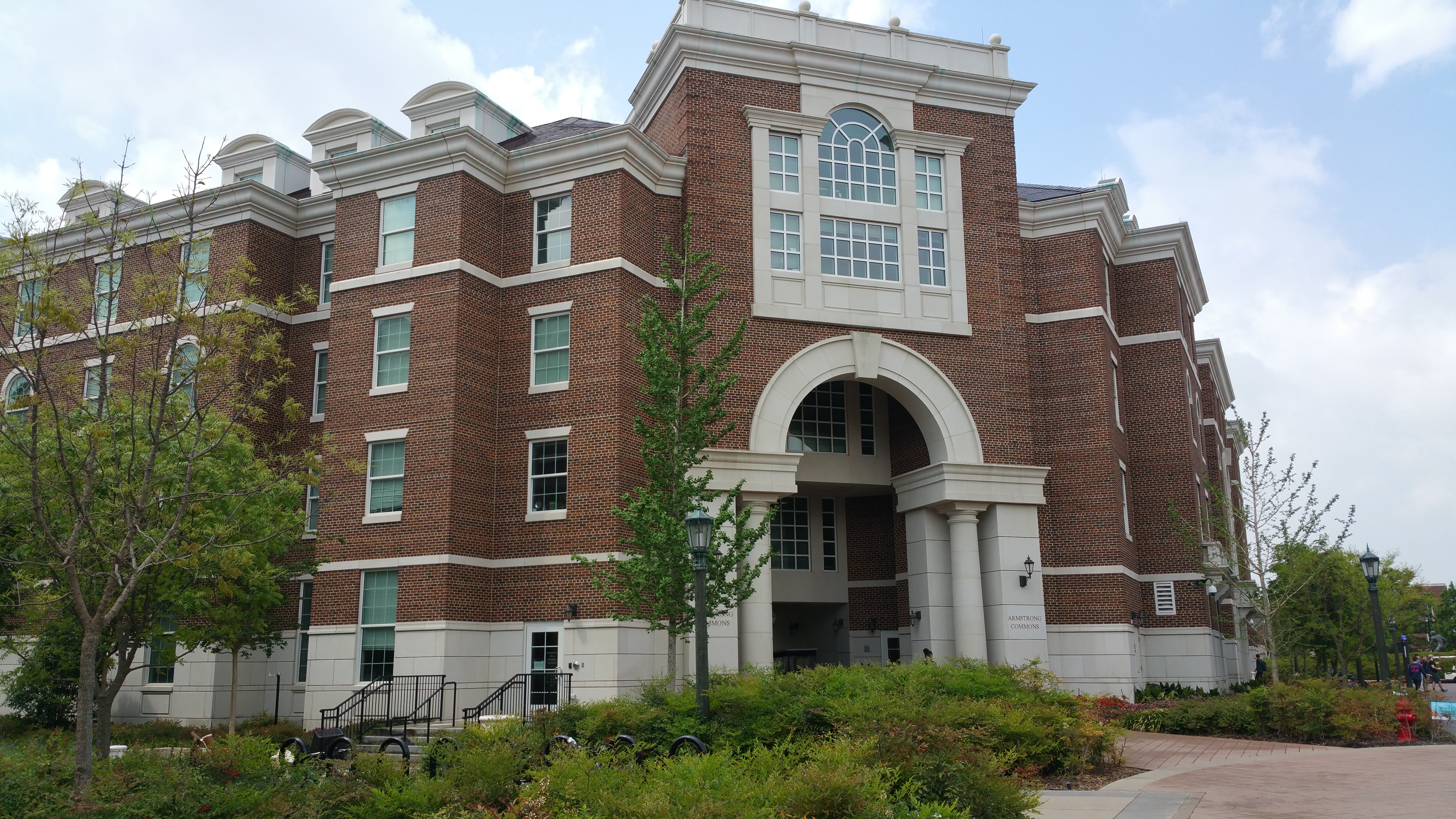
Armstrong Commons, one of five residential commons opened in 2014

Since the autumn of 2014, Southern Methodist University's undergraduate housing system has operated on a residential commons model rooted in the colleges of Oxford and Cambridge universities in England. Undergraduate students are required to live on campus for their first two years, and they must live their first year in one of the eleven residential commons that they are randomly sorted into after enrollment. Each commons houses a faculty-in-residence and a residential community director that organize events and interact with the residents. The eleven residential commons are Armstrong, Boaz, Cockrell-McIntosh, Crum, Kathy Crow, Loyd, Mary Hay-Peyton-Shuttles, McElvaney, Morrison-McGinnis, Virginia-Snider, and Ware. Built in 1926, Virginia-Snider Commons is the oldest of the current residence halls. It served as a women's dormitory in the university's early years, and it later served as the common residence hall for students in the University Honors Program before the implementation of the residential commons model. The youngest commons are those that opened in 2014: Armstrong, Kathy Crow, Ware, Loyd, and Crum.

=== Student organizations ===
Southern Methodist University is home to almost three hundred student organizations, including academic, professional, fraternal, sporting, ethnic themed, religious, service, and political diversity groups. Notable examples include the Feminist Equality Movement (FEM), the service organization Mustang Heroes, one of the largest organizations on campus, and the Embrey Human Rights Program. Student organizations such as Student Foundation and Program Council frequently sponsor all-student events on various weekdays and weekends as well as boulevard tents. Student Foundation helps put on popular events such as Family Weekend, the Tate lectures, Celebration of Lights, Homecoming, and Perunapalooza.

=== Religious life ===
The Office of the Chaplain and Religious Life house religious organizations on campus. There are multiple Christian organizations, Hillel, and a Muslim Students Association. The South Asian Student Association hosts a Diwali celebration yearly. There is a Catholic Center on campus.

=== Student media ===
The Daily Campus was the independent student newspaper between 1915 and 2018. The frequency of the publication changed throughout the years and with the change in semesters. Publishing less frequently over the summer, for example. The board of directors of The Student Media Company, the independent nonprofit that at one time oversaw all student media, including KSMU and Rotunda, voted to dissolve due to a lack of funds in April 2018. Although still publishing in digital format, the newspaper lost its independent status in May 2018.

Other student media include:

- The Rotunda, the official SMU yearbook
- SMU-TV, a student-run television station serving the Park Cities community
- The Daily Update, a weekday morning newscast that airs on SMU-TV and smudailymustang.com
- Hilltopics, a publication sponsored by the University Honors Program that publishes periodically
- The Muddler, a satirical newspaper
- SMU LOOK, a student-run fashion magazine, website, Instagram, TikTok, and YouTube channel
- SMU Style, a student-run fashion and lifestyle blog

As of May 2018, The Daily Campus was placed under the control of the school's journalism department.

KSMU, a student-radio station, operated from 1964 to 1989. It broadcast as a carrier-current and FM station; in the 1980s, it was restricted to broadcasting within the student center and via local cable. The call letters were changed to KPNI, which operated from 1995 to 2011. In the latter days, it was a digital streaming station and moved from management under the auspices of the Student Media Co. to the department of journalism. The university radio station was shuttered in 2011 due to a lack of funding.

=== Greek life ===
Southern Methodist University has approximately 43% of its undergraduate student body affiliated with its Greek system.

Starting in 2010, the NPC sororities began updating and rebuilding their older sorority houses. The multi-million dollar projects was received critically by some, praised by others. The first house rebuilt was Pi Beta Phi, followed by Kappa Kappa Gamma, Delta Delta Delta, Chi Omega, Kappa Alpha Theta, Alpha Chi Omega.

SMU has a zero tolerance stance against hazing and has suspended organizations for violations. Alpha Phi Alpha was suspended in 2004 due to hazing rituals during which a student went into a coma; four members of the fraternity were expelled from SMU as a result. In 2018, Phi Gamma Delta was ordered to cease all organizational activity pending a university investigation into hazing. Pi Kappa Alpha received a similar notice that year. On March 26, 2018, Pi Kappa Alpha was officially suspended by the university until the fall of 2022. This was the second suspension of a Greek Life organization in the 2017–2018 academic year after Kappa Alpha Order was suspended in October 2017.

Kappa Alpha Theta was suspended in 2022 and entered a mutual agreement with SMU through May 2025, after allegations of hazing new members. New members were pressured to consume large amounts of alcohol on February 10, 2022, and were exposed to other activities that endangered their safety and mental health. After Kappa Alpha Theta's suspension, members established the 501(c)(3) nonprofit, The Society. The Society recruits new members, has a house (off-campus), and participates in mixers with fraternities, just as Kappa Alpha Theta did. SMU added a provision to its Student Code of Conduct, warning of disciplinary action towards students who affiliate with unrecognized student organizations, such as The Society.

=== Athletics ===
Southern Methodist University's athletic teams are known as the Mustangs and participate in the NCAA's Division I, with the football team competing as a member of Division I FBS. The football team plays at Gerald J. Ford Stadium on the SMU campus. The Mustangs compete in the Atlantic Coast Conference (ACC) as of the 2025-26 season. Prior to that, the Mustangs played in the American Athletic Conference (previously named the Big East Conference and now known as the American Conference), the now-defunct Southwest Conference, and the Western Athletic Conference.

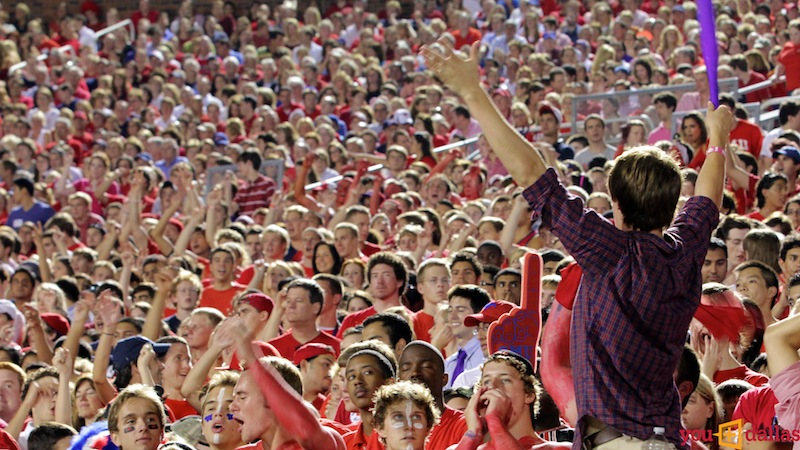
SMU football fans

SMU's closest rival in athletics is Texas Christian University (TCU) in Fort Worth, Texas. In football, SMU and TCU compete annually (with the exception of 2006, and 2020) for the Iron Skillet. SMU also competes annually with Rice University in football for the Mayor's Cup, a traveling trophy that has been created to enhance the Rice-SMU rivalry, which dates back to 1916.

From 1980 to 1985, SMU had one of the strongest programs in Division I-A (now FBS). They posted a record of 55–14–1, and finished these seasons ranked No. 21, No. 7, No. 2, No. 19, and No. 8 in the nation. These "winningest" years concluded with on February 25, 1987, due to repeated violations conducted by boosters. The NCAA administered the "death penalty" for repeated, flagrant recruiting violations. Components included cancellation of the entire 1987 season, a two-year ban from bowl appearances, a two-year ban from television appearances, a limit of seven games, all on road, in the 1988 season, a loss of three assistant coaching positions for two years and a loss of 55 new scholarships over four years. Players were allowed to transfer without sitting out one season, per standard requirement. SMU responded to the combination of these conditions by canceling the 1988 season outright.

=== Marching Band ===
SMU's marching band plays at football and basketball games, performing big band and jazz music. The approximately 80-member ensemble is nicknamed "The Best Dressed Band in the Land" due to its variety of uniform combinations. In 2001, the band performed at the first inauguration of George W. Bush.
