= Horigome =

Horigome (written: 堀米 or 堀籠) is a Japanese surname. Notable people with the surname include:

- Mitsuo Horigome (堀米 光男, born 1974), Japanese cross-country skier
- Yoshihiro Horigome (堀籠 佳宏, born 1981), Japanese sprinter
- Yuki Horigome (堀米 勇輝, born 1992), Japanese footballer
- Yukio Horigome (堀籠 幸男, born 1940), Japanese judge
- Yuto Horigome (disambiguation), multiple people
- Yuzuko Horigome (堀米 ゆず子, born 1957), Japanese classical violinist, laureate 1980 of the Queen Elisabeth Competition

== See also ==
- Horigome Station, a railway station in Sano, Tochigi Prefecture, Japan
