= Robert Dedman =

Robert Dedman may refer to:

- Robert H. Dedman Sr. (1926–2002), American businessman and philanthropist
- Robert H. Dedman Jr. (born 1957), American heir and businessman
