= Deborah Coonts =

American writer and lawyer

- Born: Deborah Buell; Dallas, Texas, U.S.
- Education: Hockaday preparatory school Southern Methodist University (BBA, JD); University of Texas at Austin (MA); New York University (LLM)
- Occupation: Writer
- Spouse: Stephen Coonts (divorced)
- Writing career
- Period: 1999 – present
- Genres: Romantic mystery Humorous fiction
- Notable works: Wanna Get Lucky? Lucky Bastard
- Notable awards: RITA award double finalist
- Website: www.deborahcoonts.com

Deborah Coonts (born Deborah Buell) is an American novelist and lawyer best known for her Lucky O'Toole Las Vegas Adventures series of romantic, humorous mystery novels.

== Early life and education ==
Coonts grew up in Dallas, Texas, where she attended the Hockaday preparatory school. She received a Bachelor of Business Administration degree from Southern Methodist University's Cox School of Business, and received a Master's degree in small business finance from the University of Texas at Austin's McCombs School of Business, a Master of Laws in taxation from New York University School of Law, and a Juris Doctor from Southern Methodist University's Dedman School of Law.

== Career ==
Coonts was admitted to the Texas Bar Association in 1989 and practiced tax law in Colorado after being admitted to its bar in 1990.

While still practicing law, she wrote for Aviation for Women magazine from 1999 to 2005.

Her first book, Wanna Get Lucky?, was included in The New York Times "Notable Crime Books of 2010" and was a double finalist for the Romance Writers of America's 2011 RITA award in the categories of "Best First Book" and "Novel With Strong Romantic Elements." Lucky Bastard, fourth in the Lucky O'Toole series, was released by Forge Books in May 2013 and was a Denver Post bestseller in June 2013.

An essay by Coonts was included in the anthology Fade, Sag, Crumble: Ten Las Vegas Writers Confront Decay, published by CityLife Books in 2011.

In a 2012 interview with The Big Thrill magazine, Coonts said her debut series is based in Las Vegas because "the whole world wanders through Vegas. The stories are endless."

== Personal life ==
Coonts is a licensed commercial pilot and instrument rated flight instructor in single-engine land and sea planes. She lives in Las Vegas and has one son. She was married to novelist Stephen Coonts.

== Books ==
=== Fiction ===
==== Lucky O'Toole Las Vegas Adventures series ====
- Wanna Get Lucky? (June 2015) (ISBN 978-0985792589)
- Lucky Stiff (July 2015) (ISBN 978-0996571203)
- So Damn Lucky (July 2015) (ISBN 978-0996571210)
- Lucky Bastard (July 2015) (ISBN 978-0996571227)
- Lucky Catch (June 2015) (ISBN 978-0985792596)
- Lucky Break (November 2015) (ISBN 978-0996571272)
- Lucky the Hard Way (November 2016) (ISBN 978-1944831820)
- Lucky Ride (June 2017) (ISBN 978-1944831752)
- Lucky Score (February 2018) (ISBN 978-1944831646)
- Lucky Ce Soir (February 2019) (ISBN 978-1944831592)
- Lucky Enough (May 2020) (ISBN 978-1944831011)

==== Brinda Rose Humorous Mystery series ====
- 90 Days to Score (October 2020) (ISBN 978-1944831066)

==== Kate Sawyer Medical Thriller series ====
- After Me (December 2016) (ISBN 978-1944831813)
- Deadfall (November 2020) (ISBN 978-1944831097)

==== Other books ====
- Deep Water (March 2017) (ISBN 978-1944831974)
- Crushed (February 2016) (ISBN 978-0996571296)
- The Housewife Assassin Gets Lucky (August 2018) (ISBN 978-0692150924)
- Lucky Double (April 2017) (ISBN 978-1944831738)
- The Lucky O’Toole Vegas Adventure Boxset 1 (March 2018) (ISBN 978-1944831653)
- The Lucky O’Toole Vegas Adventure Boxset 2 (March 2018) (ISBN 978-1944831691)
- The Complete Lucky O’Toole Novella Collection (January 2018) (ASIN B078TNN7D2)

==== Novellas ====
- Lucky In Love (June 2015) (ASIN B00ZNGJ066)
- Lucky Bang (June 2015) (ASIN B00ZNGJA48)
- Lucky Now and Then (June 2015) (ASIN B00ZNGJDKY)
- Lucky Flash (September 2015) (ASIN B014VCCRS0)

=== Non-fiction ===
- Fade, Sag, Crumble: Ten Las Vegas Writers Confront Decay (contributor, 2011) (ISBN 978-1932173796)
