= Dedman School of Law =

Law school in Dallas, Texas, US

SMU Dedman School of Law
- Motto: Veritas Liberabit Vos (Latin)
- Parent school: Southern Methodist University
- Established: 1925
- School type: Private
- Endowment: $1.633 billion (parent institution for FY 2019)
- Dean: Jason P. Nance
- Location: Dallas, Texas, U.S. 32.8464°N 96.7861°W
- Enrollment: 900
- Faculty: 50 full-time
- USNWR ranking: 42nd (tie) (2024)
- Bar pass rate: 84.86% (2023)
- Website: www.smu.edu/law

The SMU Dedman School of Law (SMU Law) is the law school of Southern Methodist University in Dallas, Texas, United States. The school was founded in February 1925 as part of Southern Methodist University. It was renamed in February 2001 to honor benefactors Nancy Dedman and Robert H. Dedman Sr. One of 10 law schools in Texas, it was the only one in the city of Dallas until the University of North Texas at Dallas opened as a law school in 2014.

== Admissions ==
=== Statistics ===
Admissions Stats
Class of:	2020-2021	2021-2022	2022-2023	2023-2024
25th - 50th - 75th percentile LSAT	156 - 162 - 164	158 - 163 - 164	160 - 164 - 166	156 - 161 - 163
25th - 50th - 75th percentile GPA	3.44 - 3.73 - 3.84	3.43 - 3.76 - 3.89	3.67 - 3.83 - 3.91	3.60 - 3.86 - 3.93
Acceptance rate	40.8%	33.4%	32.7%	30.4%
Applications received	1847	2334	2175	2540
Acceptances	753	780	711	772
Matriculants	226	226	190	227

From 2020 to 2024, SMU law had an acceptance rate of about 34%. The median LSAT score was about 163, and the median GPA was around 3.80.

== Academic profile ==
SMU Dedman School of Law offers Juris Doctor, Master of Laws, and Doctor of Juridical Science degrees. The school offers two joint degree programs, a J.D./M.A. in Economics and a J.D./M.B.A. The J.D./M.A. in Economics is offered in connection with the SMU Department of Economics in Dedman College, and the J.D./M.B.A. is offered in connection with the Cox School of Business at SMU. The fall 2019 class had a median LSAT score of 161 and a median undergraduate GPA of 3.7. LSAT/UGPA medians were calculated by the Law School Admission Council based on matriculant lists provided by the law school to the American Bar Association.

Each JD student must complete 87 credit hours, with 31 of these hours forming part of the mandatory curriculum in the first year. After the first year, students must complete a course in professional responsibility, two upper-level writing courses (including an edited writing seminar in which an extensive, scholarly, and expository writing project is reviewed and critiqued by the professor), Constitutional Law II, and a practical skills course. All students are required to perform 30 hours of public service before graduating.

== Programs and resources ==
Dedman Law is home to four independent law journals: The SMU Law Review, Journal of Air Law and Commerce, The International Lawyer, and the SMU Science & Technology Law Review.

Dedman Law offers several law clinics for upper-division students. The law clinics include: the W.W. Caruth, Jr. Child Advocacy Clinic, Civil Clinic, Criminal Justice Clinic, Family Immigration Detention Clinic, Federal Taxpayers Clinic, First Amendment Clinic, Consumer Advocacy Project, Small Business Clinic & Trademark Clinic, Judge Elmo B. Hunter Legal Center for Victims of Crimes Against Women, Innocence Clinic, Patent Law Clinic, and Vansickle Family Law Clinic.

Dedman Law offers a summer program at the University of Oxford in Oxford, England, multiple international programs, and the Underwood Law Library.

== Underwood Law Library ==
SMU's Underwood Law Library is the largest private academic law library west of the Mississippi River. Its collections include approximately 666,498 law-related volumes and equivalents, ranking the library among the top 20% of all law libraries in the United States.

== Rankings ==
In 2024, SMU Dedman School of Law was ranked No. 42 in the nation by U.S. News & World Report.

== Employment ==
According to SMU's official 2018 ABA-required disclosures, 80% of the Class of 2018 obtained full-time, long-term, JD-required employment nine months after graduation. SMU's Law School Transparency under-employment score is 10.8%, indicating the percentage of the Class of 2018 unemployed, pursuing an additional degree, or working in a non-professional, short-term, or part-time job nine months after graduation.

== Costs ==
The total cost of attendance (indicating the cost of tuition, fees, and living expenses) at SMU for the 2020–2021 academic year is $83,464. The average amount borrowed for law school by members of the 2014 graduating class was $124,617.38.

== Notable faculty ==
- Bryan Garner
- Paul Hardin III
- A. Kenneth Pye
- Dale Carpenter

== Notable alumni ==
- James A. Baker, Justice of the Texas Supreme Court
- Keith Bergelt, former U.S. Diplomat and CEO of Open Invention Network
- Jane J. Boyle is a district judge for the United States District Court for the Northern District of Texas
- Dan Branch, former member Texas House of Representatives
- Angela Braly, former president and chief executive officer for WellPoint (now Anthem)
- Raleigh Brown, member of the Texas House of Representatives; Texas State District Court judge in Abilene
- Jeff Cox (Legal Law Masters in Taxation), judge since 2005 of the Louisiana 26th Judicial District Court of Bossier and Webster parishes
- Catherine Crier, Dallas County District Judge, investigative journalist
- Robert H. Dedman Jr., former CEO of ClubCorp
- Robert H. Dedman Sr., founder of private club network ClubCorp, Inc. and the law school's co-benefactor
- Craig T. Enoch, former associate justice of the Texas Supreme Court
- Gerald J. Ford, noted Texas banker and businessman
- David C. Godbey, federal judge
- Rusty Hardin, an American attorney and head of the Houston law firm Rusty Hardin & Associates, P.C
- Nathan Hecht, Chief Justice of the Texas Supreme Court
- Yukio Horigome, Justice, Supreme Court of Japan
- Todd Ames Hunter, Texas State Representative
- Jerry Jones Jr., Chief Sales and Marketing Officer and Executive Vice President of the Dallas Cowboys
- S. M. Krishna, Minister of External Affairs of India and Former Chief Minister of Karnataka
- Stephen N. Limbaugh Jr., Justice, Supreme Court of Missouri
- Barbara M. Lynn, Judge, United States District Court for the Northern District of Texas
- Robert B. Maloney, federal judge
- Bagir Manan, Chief Justice of the Supreme Court of Indonesia
- Harriet Miers, White House Deputy Chief of Staff, White House Counsel for George W. Bush
- Getoar Mjeku, Deputy Minister of Economy of Kosovo
- Robert Mosbacher Jr., an American businessman, founder of BizCorps
- James Latane Noel Jr., Attorney General of Texas
- Irma Carrillo Ramirez, circuit judge of the United States Court of Appeals for the Fifth Circuit since 2023
- John Ratcliffe, American politician who is the 6th Director of National Intelligence and served as the Congressman for Texas's 4th congressional district from 2015 to 2020.
- Trevor Rees-Jones, founder and chairman of Chief Oil & Gas
- Robert Rowling, founder of TRT Holdings, the holding company of Omni Hotels & Resorts and Gold's Gym
- Edward B. Rust Jr., chairman and chief executive officer of State Farm Mutual Automobile Insurance Company
- Rick Scott, American businessman, politician and junior United States senator from Florida. He served as 45th Governor of Florida from 2011 to 2019.
- Lamar Smith, the former U.S. Representative for Texas's 21st congressional district
- Helmut Sohmen, chairman of BW Group and a former Hong Kong legislator
- William Steger, Judge, United States District Court for the Eastern District of Texas
- Gillian Triggs, President of the Australian Human Rights Commission
- Tsai Hong-tu, a Taiwanese businessman and banker
- Lamar White, investigative journalist known for his work on racism and political corruption in the Deep South
