= C. David Cush =

American businessman

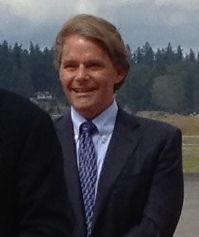
- Born: Shreveport, Louisiana

C. David Cush is the CEO of Service King, an auto repair company.

Cush was the CEO of Virgin America from December 2007 to December 2016. He was named CEO on November 26, 2007, effective December 10, 2007, replacing Fred Reid.

Prior to joining Virgin America, Cush held a number of positions at American Airlines in his 20 years with the airline, including Vice President of International Planning and Alliances and Chief of Sales. He also oversaw the re-organization of American Airlines' St. Louis hub at Lambert Field following American's acquisition of TWA, Cush earned his MBA from the Cox School of Business, Southern Methodist University.

== Early life and education ==
Cush studied at Southern Methodist University, where he earned a Bachelor of Science degree in psychology and a Bachelor of Fine Arts degree in broadcast/film in 1982. He later earned a Master of Business Administration from the same institution in 1983.

He also completed executive education at the Stanford Directors’ College in 2017.

== Career ==
=== Early career ===
Cush began his career at Electronic Data Systems, serving as a financial analyst in Dallas before becoming chief financial officer of EDS do Brasil in São Paulo from 1984 to 1985.

=== American Airlines ===
In 1986, he joined American Airlines, beginning a career with the company that spanned more than two decades and included financial, operational, regulatory, and commercial leadership positions across the United States, Europe, Latin America, and Asia.

During his tenure at American Airlines, Cush held progressively senior leadership positions. He served as Managing Director of Finance and Administration for operations across Europe, the Middle East, Africa, the Caribbean, and Latin America. He later became Managing Director of Sales and Operations for the Caribbean and Central America and subsequently managing director of international alliances, where he was involved in development of international carrier partnerships, including work related to the Oneworld alliance.

As Vice President for International Planning and Regulatory Affairs from 2000 to 2003, Cush oversaw international route strategy and regulatory negotiations with foreign governments and aviation authorities, including agreements involving Chinese carriers.

From 2003 to 2004, he served as Vice President of American Airlines’ St. Louis hub, where he managed operational restructuring and workforce redeployment following strategic network consolidation.

He was promoted to Senior Vice President of Global Sales and Distribution in 2004 and became a member of the company’s Executive Committee. In this role, he led commercial strategy across more than fifty countries and renegotiated distribution agreements with travel agencies and reservation systems.

=== Aerolíneas Argentinas ===
From 1998 to 2000, Cush served as chief operating officer of Aerolíneas Argentinas. He oversaw operations, sales, and marketing during a period of operational modernization, including fleet modernization and implementation of updated information technology systems.

=== Virgin America ===
In 2007, Cush was appointed president, chief executive officer, and board director of Virgin America. He was also the company’s largest individual investor.

Under his leadership, Virgin America expanded its route network, introduced operational and inflight technology upgrades, and completed its initial public offering in 2014, the first IPO by a U.S. airline since 2002.

The airline introduced fleet-wide Wi-Fi connectivity, live television, touchscreen inflight entertainment systems, and operational digital modernization initiatives during his tenure.

In 2016, Virgin America was acquired by Alaska Airlines in a transaction valued at approximately $4 billion.

=== Service King Collision ===
Cush joined the board of Service King Collision in 2018 and was appointed Chief Executive Officer during a period of financial and operational restructuring. He led modernization of financial and operational systems and oversaw company restructuring during the economic disruption caused by the COVID-19 pandemic and subsequent supply chain distributions .

In 2022, Cush negotiated a recapitalization involving new investment and debt reduction that preceded the company’s merger with Crash Champions under ownership by Clearlake Capital Group.

=== Board service ===
Cush has served on the boards of several public and private companies in the transportation, aerospace, and automotive services sectors. His corporate board appointments include service as a director of Southwest Airlines from 2024 to 2026, Board Director of Vive Collision Repair from 2023 to the present, Director of Service King Collision from 2018 to 2022, Director of Virgin America from 2007 to 2016, and Board Director of Vought Aircraft Industries from 2005 to 2009.

He has also held nonprofit governance roles, including service on the Board of the Bay Area Council beginning in 2007, serving as chairman from 2013 to 2015.

He has served on the Executive Board of the Dedman College at Southern Methodist University since 2013.

Cush served on the board of the Silicon Valley Leadership Group from 2007 to 2016 and was a member of its Executive Committee from 2012 to 2016. He also served on the Board of the Andre Agassi Foundation for Education from 2004 to 2009.

In 2015, he served as Chair of the San Francisco Heart Association gala.
