= Virgin Airways =

Virgin Airways may refer to:

- Virgin Atlantic, a British airline primarily serving routes between North America and Europe
- Virgin Australia, an airline primarily servicing routes in Australia
- Virgin America, a former airline in the United States
