= John Rainey =

John Rainey is the name of:

- John W. Rainey (1880–1923), U.S. Representative from Illinois
- John Rainey (baseball) (1864–1912), American Major League Baseball player
- John David Rainey (born 1945), U.S. federal judge

== See also ==
- Jon Douglas Rainey (born 1970), professional thief on the reality TV show It Takes a Thief
