= Raleigh Brown =

American politician (1921–2009)

Member of the Texas House of Representatives from the 84-2 district
- In office 1963–1967
- Preceded by: Roy Truett Latimer
- Succeeded by: Frank Calhoun

Texas State Judge of 42nd District
- In office 1967–1972

Justice of Texas 11th Court of Appeals
- In office 1972–1986

Personal details
- Born: Raleigh Holden Brown; December 10, 1921 Shreveport, Louisiana, U.S.
- Died: May 23, 2009 (aged 87) Abilene, Texas, U.S.
- Party: Democratic
- Spouse: Margaret Sears (m. 1948; died 2007)
- Children: Nancy Jennings; Betsy Skorburg; Julie Denny
- Education: Middle Tennessee State University; Vanderbilt University Law School; Southern Methodist University Law School
- Occupation: Attorney, judge, politician

Raleigh Holden Brown (December 10, 1921 – May 23, 2009) was an American politician, lawyer and judge. He was member of the Democratic Party who served in the Texas House of Representatives from 1963 to 1967, and later became a judge.

== Life and career ==
Raleigh Holden Brown was born on December 10, 1921, in Shreveport, Louisiana. Brown's ancestry was from Tennessee, where also lived much of his early life. He graduated with a B.S. degree from Middle Tennessee State College in 1947; and attended Vanderbilt University Law School and Southern Methodist University Law School for his legal education.

He was admitted to the Texas State Bar in 1951. Brown was elected to the Texas House of Representatives in 1962, and later became a Texas state judge. He lived in Abilene, Texas.
