= Robert H. Dedman Jr. =

American business heir

- Born: June 26, 1957 (age 69); Dallas, Texas
- Education: University of Texas at Austin; Southern Methodist University
- Occupation: Businessman
- Spouse: Rachael Redecker Dedman
- Children: Catherine Dedman; Nancy Dedman
- Parent(s): Robert H. Dedman Sr. Nancy Dedman

Robert H. Dedman Jr. is an American heir and businessman.

== Biography ==
=== Early life ===
Robert Henry Dedman Jr., was born on June 26, 1957, in Dallas, Texas. His father was Robert H. Dedman Sr., founder of ClubCorp. His sister, Patty Dedman Dietz, sits on its board of directors. He graduated from the University of Texas at Austin with a B.A. in economics in 1979. He received an M.B.A. from the Cox School of Business in 1980 and a J.D. from the Dedman School of Law in 1984, both at Southern Methodist University.

=== Career ===
He joined ClubCorp in 1980 and worked as Director of Corporate Planning from 1980 to 1984. From 1984 to 1987, he was Associate at Salomon Brothers, where he specialized in mergers and acquisitions. He served as Chief Financial Officer of ClubCorp in 1987, President from 1989 to August 2002, Chief Operating Officer from 1989 to 1997, and chief executive officer from 1998 to August 2004. He served on the board of directors of Home Interiors and Gifts, JPMorgan Chase Dallas Region and the Stewart Information Services Corporation.

=== Organizations ===
He has served on the board of trustees of the Southwest Region of the Boys and Girls Clubs of America, the Southwestern Medical Foundation, the Dallas Museum of Art, Southern Methodist University and the University of Texas at Austin Development Board. He is past chairman of the Texas Business Hall of Fame. He chairs the 21st Century Council at SMU, where he is also a member of the Young Presidents' Organization and the Dallas Citizens Council.

=== Golf ===
As Chairman of ClubCorp, he was named one of the most influential people in golf. He is on the President's Council of the United States Golf Association and the board of the National Golf Foundation.

=== Personal life ===
He is married to Rachael Redecker Dedman. They have two daughters.

== Bibliography ==
- Our Star Service Journey (1998)
