= Gregg Costa =

American judge (born 1972)

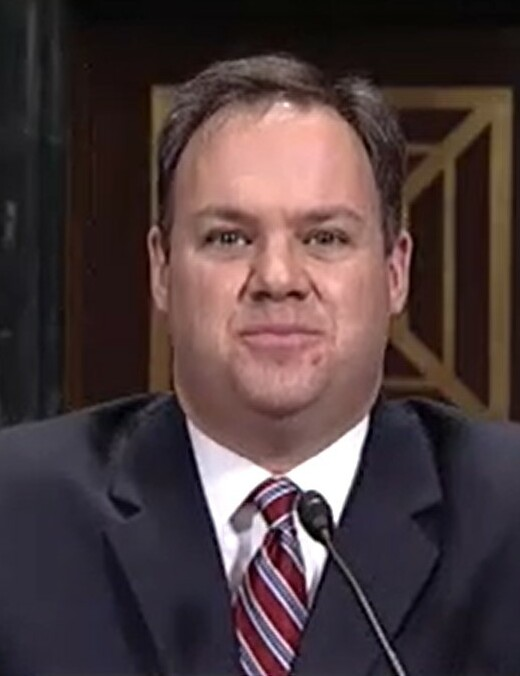
- Costa in 2014

Judge of the United States Court of Appeals for the Fifth Circuit
- In office June 2, 2014 – August 31, 2022
- Appointed by: Barack Obama
- Preceded by: Fortunato Benavides
- Succeeded by: Irma Carrillo Ramirez

Judge of the United States District Court for the Southern District of Texas
- In office April 26, 2012 – June 2, 2014
- Appointed by: Barack Obama
- Preceded by: John David Rainey
- Succeeded by: Fernando Rodriguez Jr.

Personal details
- Born: Gregg Jeffrey Costa; June 19, 1972 (age 54) Baltimore, Maryland, U.S.
- Party: Democratic
- Education: Dartmouth College (BA); University of Texas, Austin (JD)

Gregg Jeffrey Costa (born June 19, 1972) is an American attorney who is a former United States circuit judge of the United States Court of Appeals for the Fifth Circuit and former United States district judge of the United States District Court for the Southern District of Texas.

== Early life and education ==
Costa was born in Baltimore, Maryland, but grew up in Richardson, Texas, where he attended Richardson High School. He earned a Bachelor of Arts degree in 1994 from Dartmouth College. While at Dartmouth, Costa interned for the Democratic National Committee. After college, Costa taught elementary school in Sunflower, Mississippi, as part of the Teach for America program from 1994 until 1996. He then earned a Juris Doctor from the University of Texas School of Law in 1999, where he was the Editor-in-Chief of the Texas Law Review. From 1999 until 2000, Costa served as a law clerk to Judge A. Raymond Randolph on the U.S. Court of Appeals for the District of Columbia Circuit. He then served as a law clerk to Chief Justice William Rehnquist on the U.S. Supreme Court from 2001 until 2002.

== Career ==
From 2002 to 2005, Costa worked as an associate at the law firm Weil, Gotshal & Manges in Houston. From 2005 to 2012, Costa served as an assistant United States attorney in the Southern District of Texas.

=== Allen Stanford prosecution ===
Likely Costa's highest-profile prosecution in his six years as a federal prosecutor was the case against convicted Ponzi schemer Allen Stanford, who was indicted in 2009. In January 2011, Stanford's legal team requested a delay of the start of his scheduled January 24, 2011, trial, noting that they had only taken over his defense in October 2010. Costa told the judge presiding over the trial that while he did not object to some delay in the trial, "the requested continuance of two years is excessive." In February 2011, Stanford sued Costa and his fellow prosecutor Paul Pelletier, along with several employees of the Securities and Exchange Commission and the Federal Bureau of Investigation, complaining of "abusive law enforcement" and seeking $7.2 billion in damages. In March 2011, Stanford's attorneys argued that the defendant's right to a speedy trial had been violated. Costa, however, told the Associated Press that delays largely were the result of Stanford's own requests for continuances. In March 2012, Stanford was found guilty on 13 of 14 counts including fraud, obstructing investigators and conspiracy to commit money laundering.

=== Federal judicial service ===
==== District court service ====
In July 2011, Texas's two Republican senators, John Cornyn and Kay Bailey Hutchison, sent a letter to President Barack Obama, recommending that he nominate Costa to the vacant seat on the United States District Court for the Southern District of Texas that had been created when Judge John David Rainey took senior status in June 2010. The seat would be based in the Galveston Division. The anticipated nomination earned bipartisan support, as Democratic United States Representative Lloyd Doggett, who serves as the spokesman for Texas Democrats on federal judicial matters, urged the president to nominate Costa as well. On September 8, 2011, President Obama nominated Costa to the seat on the U.S. District Court for the Southern District of Texas. He received a hearing by the Senate Judiciary Committee on November 2, 2011, and his nomination was reported to the floor on December 1, 2011. Costa's nomination was approved by the U.S. Senate on April 26, 2012, by a 97–2 vote. He received his commission the same day. His service as a district court judge was terminated on June 2, 2014, when he was elevated to the court of appeals.

==== Court of appeals service ====
On December 19, 2013, President Obama nominated Costa to a seat on the United States Court of Appeals for the Fifth Circuit vacated by Fortunato Benavides, who assumed senior status on February 3, 2012. He received a hearing before the U.S. Senate Judiciary Committee on February 25, 2014. On March 27, 2014, Costa's nomination was reported out of committee by a voice vote. On May 13, 2014, Senate Majority Leader Harry Reid filed for cloture on Costa's nomination. On May 15, 2014, the United States Senate invoked cloture on his nomination by a 58–36 vote. On May 20, 2014, he was confirmed by a 97–0 vote. He received his commission on June 2, 2014. In January 2022, Costa announced he would be resigning from the court in August 2022. Costa resigned on August 31, 2022.

=== Cases ===
Costa dissented in Collins v. Mnuchin (5th Cir. 2019), a ruling that struck down the Federal Housing Finance Agency as a violation of the separation of powers and was affirmed by the Supreme Court in Collins v. Yellen. Costa argued that the Court violates the separation of powers itself by ruling that Congress violated the separation of powers by creating an independent agency.

=== Post-judicial career ===
In September 2022, Costa became a partner at Gibson, Dunn & Crutcher LLP.

== See also ==
- List of Hispanic and Latino American jurists
- List of law clerks for the chief justice of the United States

Legal offices
Preceded by John David Rainey	Judge of the United States District Court for the Southern District of Texas; 2012–2014	Succeeded by Fernando Rodriguez Jr.
Preceded by Fortunato Benavides	Judge of the United States Court of Appeals for the Fifth Circuit; 2014–2022	Succeeded by Irma Carrillo Ramirez
