= Fernando Rodriguez Jr. =

American judge (born 1969)

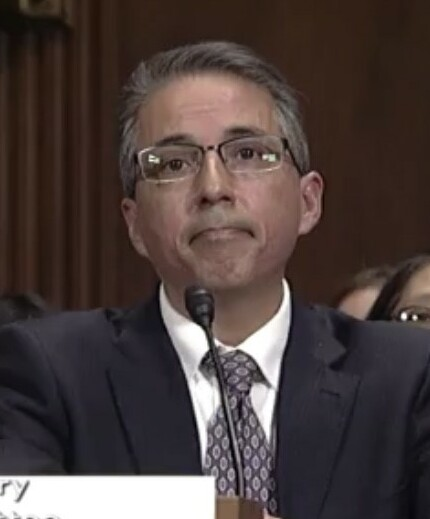

Judge of the United States District Court for the Southern District of Texas
- Incumbent
- Assumed office June 12, 2018
- Appointed by: Donald Trump
- Preceded by: Gregg Costa

Personal details
- Born: 1969 (age 56–57) Harlingen, Texas, U.S.
- Education: Yale University (BA); University of Texas at Austin (JD)

Fernando Rodriguez Jr. (born 1969) is an American lawyer and jurist serving as a United States district judge of the U.S. District Court for the Southern District of Texas. He was appointed in 2018 by President Donald Trump.

== Biography ==
Rodriguez was born in 1969 in Harlingen, Texas. He graduated from Yale University in 1991 with a Bachelor of Arts. From 1991 to 1994, he was a teacher at an elementary school in Houston through Teach For America. He then attended the University of Texas School of Law, graduating in 1997 with a Juris Doctor.

From 1997 to 1998, he served as a briefing attorney for then-Associate Justice Nathan Hecht of the Supreme Court of Texas. Before joining International Justice Mission, Rodriguez was a partner in the Dallas office of Baker Botts LLP, where his practice focused on commercial litigation.

Before becoming a judge, Rodriguez worked as a field office director in the Dominican Republic for International Justice Mission, where he led efforts to combat sex trafficking of children. His work contributed to the rescue of more than 110 victims and 21 convictions of the perpetrators. He previously led similar efforts against the sexual abuse of children in Bolivia.

=== Federal judicial service ===
On September 7, 2017, President Donald Trump nominated Rodriguez to serve as a United States District Judge of the United States District Court for the Southern District of Texas, to the seat vacated by Judge Gregg Costa, who was elevated to the United States Court of Appeals for the Fifth Circuit on May 20, 2014. On November 29, 2017, a hearing was held on his nomination before the Senate Judiciary Committee. On January 11, 2018, his nomination was reported out of committee by a voice vote. On June 5, 2018, the United States Senate invoked cloture on his nomination by a 94–1 vote. Later that day, Rodriguez was confirmed by a 96–0 vote. He received his judicial commission on June 12, 2018.

== See also ==
- List of Hispanic and Latino American jurists

Legal offices
Preceded by Gregg Costa	Judge of the United States District Court for the Southern District of Texas; 2018–present	Incumbent
