= List of Virgin America destinations =

This is a list of destinations operated to by Virgin America, a former American airline that was headquartered in Burlingame, California. On April 4, 2016, Virgin America announced it had agreed to be acquired by Alaska Air Group, with the transaction closing by December 14, 2016. At the time, Virgin America had 24 destinations. Virgin America officially merged with Alaska Airlines in 2018.

The list includes destinations that Virgin America was serving or had formerly served by April 24, 2018, before the airline's merger with Alaska Airlines. At the time, Virgin America was serving 31 destinations, consisting of 28 domestic destinations and three destinations in Mexico.

== Destinations ==
Country (Subdivision)	City	Airport	Notes	Refs
Canada (Ontario)	Toronto	Toronto Pearson International Airport	Terminated	
Mexico (Baja California Sur)	San José del Cabo	Los Cabos International Airport		
Mexico (Jalisco)	Puerto Vallarta	Licenciado Gustavo Díaz Ordaz International Airport		
Mexico (Quintana Roo)	Cancún	Cancún International Airport		
United States (Alaska)	Anchorage	Ted Stevens Anchorage International Airport	Terminated	
United States (California)	Los Angeles	Los Angeles International Airport	Hub	
United States (California)	Palm Springs	Palm Springs International Airport		
United States (California)	San Diego	San Diego International Airport		
United States (California)	San Francisco	San Francisco International Airport	Hub	
United States (California)	San Jose	San Jose International Airport	Terminated	
United States (California)	Santa Ana	John Wayne Airport	Terminated	
United States (Colorado)	Denver	Denver International Airport		
United States (District of Columbia)	Washington, D.C.	Dulles International Airport		
United States (District of Columbia)	Washington, D.C.	Ronald Reagan Washington National Airport		
United States (Florida)	Fort Lauderdale	Fort Lauderdale–Hollywood International Airport		
United States (Florida)	Miami	Miami International Airport		
United States (Florida)	Orlando	Orlando International Airport		
United States (Hawaii)	Honolulu	Daniel K. Inouye International Airport		
United States (Hawaii)	Maui	Kahului Airport		
United States (Hawaii)	Kailua-Kona	Kona International Airport		
United States (Illinois)	Chicago	O'Hare International Airport		
United States (Indiana)	Indianapolis	Indianapolis International Airport		
United States (Louisiana)	New Orleans	Louis Armstrong New Orleans International Airport		
United States (Maryland)	Baltimore	Baltimore/Washington International Airport		
United States (Massachusetts)	Boston	Logan International Airport		
United States (Nevada)	Las Vegas	Harry Reid International Airport		
United States (New Jersey)	Newark	Newark Liberty International Airport		
United States (New York)	New York City	John F. Kennedy International Airport		
United States (New York)	New York City	LaGuardia Airport		
United States (North Carolina)	Raleigh	Raleigh–Durham International Airport		
United States (Oregon)	Portland	Portland International Airport		
United States (Pennsylvania)	Philadelphia	Philadelphia International Airport		
United States (Tennessee)	Nashville	Nashville International Airport		
United States (Texas)	Austin	Austin–Bergstrom International Airport		
United States (Texas)	Dallas	Dallas Fort Worth International Airport	Terminated	
United States (Texas)	Dallas	Dallas Love Field	Focus city	
United States (Washington)	Seattle	Seattle–Tacoma International Airport		
