= John David Rainey =

American judge (born 1945)

Senior Judge of the United States District Court for the Southern District of Texas
- Incumbent
- Assumed office June 11, 2010

Judge of the United States District Court for the Southern District of Texas
- In office May 14, 1990 – June 11, 2010
- Appointed by: George H. W. Bush
- Preceded by: Gabrielle Kirk McDonald
- Succeeded by: Gregg Costa

Personal details
- Born: 1945 (age 80–81) Freeport, Texas, U.S.
- Education: Southern Methodist University (BBA, JD)

John David Rainey (born 1945) is a senior United States district judge of the United States District Court for the Southern District of Texas.

== Education and career ==
Rainey was born in Freeport, Texas. He received a Bachelor of Business Administration from Southern Methodist University in 1967 and was in the United States Army from 1969 to 1970. He then received a Juris Doctor from Southern Methodist University School of Law in 1972, entering in private practice in Dallas, Texas from 1973 to 1979, and in Angleton, Texas from 1979 to 1986. He was a director of the Angleton Chamber of Commerce from 1983 to 1987. He was a judge on the 149th District Court, Brazoria County, Texas from 1987 to 1990.

=== Federal judicial service ===
On January 24, 1990, Rainey was nominated by President George H. W. Bush to a seat on the United States District Court for the Southern District of Texas vacated by Judge Gabrielle Kirk McDonald. He was confirmed by the United States Senate on May 11, 1990, and received his commission on May 14, 1990. He assumed senior status on June 11, 2010.

== Sources ==
Legal offices
Preceded by Gabrielle Kirk McDonald	Judge of the United States District Court for the Southern District of Texas; 1990–2010	Succeeded by Gregg Costa
