= Irma Carrillo Ramirez =

American judge (born 1964)

Irma Ramirez
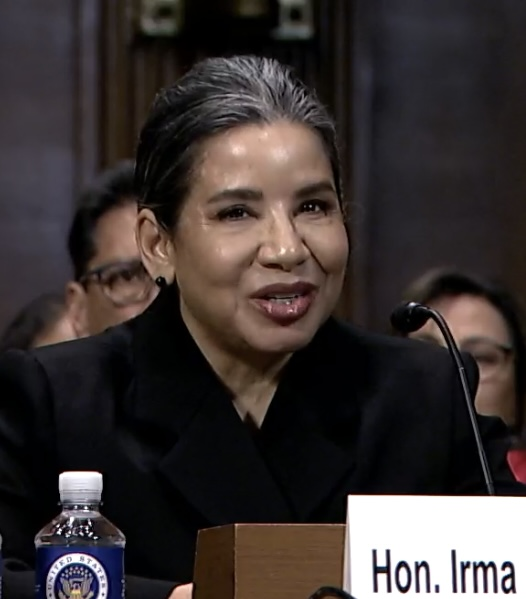
- Senate Judiciary Committee hearing - May 17, 2023

Judge of the United States Court of Appeals for the Fifth Circuit
- Incumbent
- Assumed office December 8, 2023
- Appointed by: Joe Biden
- Preceded by: Gregg Costa

Personal details
- Born: Irma Jean Carrillo; 1964 (age 61–62) Brownfield, Texas, U.S.
- Education: West Texas A&M University (BA); Southern Methodist University (JD)

Irma Carrillo Ramirez (née Carrillo; born 1964) is an American lawyer and jurist serving as a United States circuit judge of the United States Court of Appeals for the Fifth Circuit. She previously served as a United States magistrate judge of the United States District Court for the Northern District of Texas from 2002 to 2023. She is a former nominee to be a United States district judge of the United States District Court for the Northern District of Texas.

== Early life and education ==
Ramirez was born in 1964. Ramirez's parents were Mexican immigrants who came to the United States under the bracero guest worker program. She received a Bachelor of Arts degree from West Texas A&M University in 1986 and a Juris Doctor from the Southern Methodist University Dedman School of Law in 1991.

== Career ==
Ramirez began her legal career working as an associate for the law firm Locke Purnell Rain Harrell, PC (now Locke Lord LLP) in Dallas from 1991 to 1995. She served as an assistant United States attorney for the United States Attorney's Office for the Northern District of Texas, working in the Civil Division from 1995 to 1999 and the Criminal Division from 1999 to 2002. She served as a United States magistrate judge for the United States District Court for the Northern District of Texas from September 9, 2002 to December 8, 2023.

=== Notable opinions ===
In 2017, Ramirez issued Deion Sanders a $2,200 fine when he missed a deposition. The case involved a whistleblower allegation that he and others involved with a defunct charter school cheated the Federal School Lunch Program.

In 2019, Ramirez dismissed a wrongful death lawsuit brought by the family of Botham Jean against the city of Dallas. Jean was killed when off-duty Dallas Police Department officer Amber Guyger claimed she mistook him for an intruder after thinking she'd entered her own apartment, and fatally shot him. Ramirez found that the family did not show a pattern of police racism or other wrongdoing that would implicate the city.

In 2021, Ramirez was the judge for the case against Joseph Garza, a Dallas tax lawyer. Garza was accused of hiding $1 billion in income from the IRS and reducing $200 million from client tax bills by using fraudulent tax shelters.

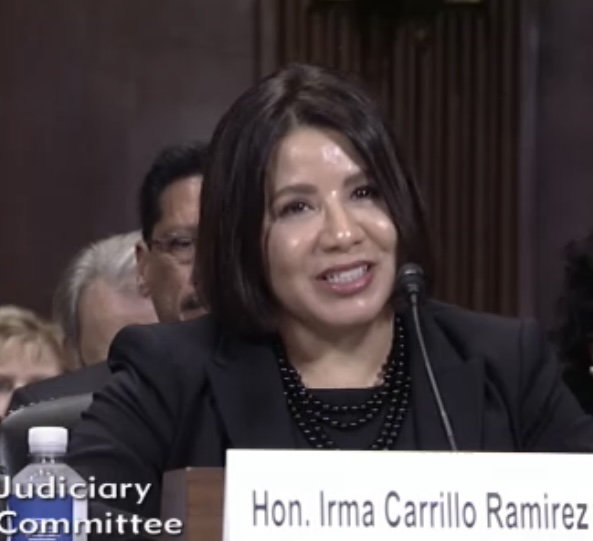
Senate Judiciary Committee hearing - September 7, 2016

=== Expired nomination to United States district court ===
On March 15, 2016, President Barack Obama nominated Ramirez to serve as a United States district judge for the United States District Court for the Northern District of Texas, to the seat vacated by Judge Terry R. Means, who assumed senior status on July 3, 2013. On September 7, 2016, a hearing before the Senate Judiciary Committee was held on her nomination. Her nomination expired on January 3, 2017, with the end of the 114th Congress.

=== United States Court of appeals service ===
On April 14, 2023, President Joe Biden announced his intent to nominate Ramirez to serve as United States circuit judge for the United States Court of Appeals for the Fifth Circuit. On April 17, 2023, her nomination was sent to the Senate. President Biden nominated Ramirez to the seat vacated by Judge Gregg Costa, who resigned on August 31, 2022. Her nomination received the support of Senators John Cornyn and Ted Cruz. On May 17, 2023, a hearing on her nomination was held before the United States Judiciary Committee. On June 8, 2023, her nomination was favorably reported by the committee by a voice vote, with Senator Josh Hawley voting no on record. On November 30, 2023, the United States Senate invoked cloture on her nomination by an 80–17 vote. On December 4, 2023, her nomination was confirmed by an 80–12 vote. She received her judicial commission on December 8, 2023. She is the first Latina to serve on the Fifth Circuit.

=== Notable cases ===
On August 14, 2025, Ramirez and Senior Judge James L. Dennis ruled that Louisiana maps “packed” and “cracked” Black communities, unlawfully diluting Black voters’ power to elect their preferred candidates under Section 2 of the Voting Rights Act.

On September 2, 2025, Ramirez was in the 2-1 majority that ruled that Trump cannot use the Alien Enemies Act to deport Venezuelans.

== See also ==
- List of Hispanic and Latino American jurists

Legal offices
| Preceded by Gregg Costa | Judge of the United States Court of Appeals for the Fifth Circuit; 2023–present | Incumbent |
