= Robert H. Dedman Sr. =

American businessman and philanthropist

- Born: 1926; Rison, Arkansas
- Died: 20 August 2002 (aged 75–76)
- Education: North Dallas High School; University of Texas at Austin; Southern Methodist University
- Occupations: Businessman, philanthropist
- Spouse: Nancy Dedman
- Children: Robert H. Dedman Jr. Patricia Dedman "Patty" Dietz

Robert H. Dedman Sr. (1926–2002) was an American businessman and philanthropist. He is best known as the founder and past chairman of ClubCorp.

== Biography ==
=== Early life ===
Robert Dedman was born in poverty in Rison, Arkansas. His family house only had two bedrooms and no electricity or running water. At the age of fourteen, he and his brother moved to Dallas, Texas, to live with their aunt. He attended North Dallas High School and graduated as valedictorian in 1944, upon which he joined the United States Navy.

Whilst serving as a sailor during the day, he received three degrees from the University of Texas at Austin, in engineering, economics, and law. After he left duty, he earned a law degree from Southern Methodist University in 1953, specializing in oil, gas, and taxation. During that time, he sold insurance during the week and real estate on the weekends.

=== Career ===
He started his career by joining a prominent law firm in Dallas. During that time, H. L. Hunt became his mentor. After learning to play golf from Byron Nelson, Ralph Guldahl, and Ben Hogan, he decided to invest in golf courses. In 1957, he founded Country Club, Inc., later renamed ClubCorp.

He served two terms as the chairman of the Texas State Highway and Public Transportation Commission of the Texas Department of Transportation. He also served on the board of directors of the Stewart Information Services Corporation.

He was invited to Camp David by President George H. W. Bush. He became the Entrepreneur of the Year in 1976 from the Cox School of Business at SMU, Dallas Humanitarian of the Year in 1980, Texas Business Hall of Fame in 1987, and the Horatio Alger Award from the Horatio Alger Association of Distinguished Americans in 1989. He was inducted in the Academy of Achievement of the Sales & Marketing Executives International (SMEI). In 2003, Dedman received the Ambassador of Golf Award, presented annually to a person who has fostered the ideals of the game on an international level and whose concern for others extends beyond the golf course.

=== Philanthropy ===
In 1986, he donated $10 million to the University of Texas at Austin College of Liberal Arts. In 2000, a street on the UT Austin campus, Robert Dedman Drive, was named for him. The Dedman Memorial Hospital in Dallas is also named for him. In 2012, the Dedman Foundation donated $5 million to SMU.

He joined the board of trustees of Southern Methodist University in 1976, and served as chairman of the board from 1992 to 1996. He donated $77 million to SMU. The Dedman College of Humanities and Sciences, the Dedman School of Law, and the Dedman Center for Lifetime Sports on the SMU campus are named in his honor.

He also donated to Sandhills Community College in Pinehurst, North Carolina, where the Robert H. Dedman Center for Business Leadership is named for him.

=== Personal life ===
In 2001, the year before he died, Dedman made the Forbes list of America's 400 wealthiest individuals with a net worth of $1.2 billion. He was married to Nancy Dedman. Together they had a son, Robert H. Dedman Jr., CEO of ClubCorp from 1998 to August 2004, and a daughter, Patricia Dedman "Patty" Dietz, who served a couple of years on its board of directors. Dedman died on 20 August 2002 from a long-term illness.

== Bibliography ==
- King of Clubs: Grow Rich in More Than Money (Taylor Publishing Company, 1998)
