= Cox School of Business =

Business school of Southern Methodist University

Coordinates: 32.8464°N 96.7861°W

Edwin L. Cox School of Business
- Motto: Veritas Liberabit Vos
- Motto in English: The truth shall set you free
- Type: Private business school
- Established: 1920
- Parent institution: Southern Methodist University
- Dean: Todd T Milbourn
- Location: Dallas, Texas, U.S.
- Campus: Urban
- Website: www.smu.edu/cox

The Edwin L. Cox School of Business is an American business school that is part of Southern Methodist University (SMU) in Dallas, Texas. The SMU Cox School of Business is headquartered in four buildings on SMU's 210-acre main campus five miles north of downtown Dallas, Texas.

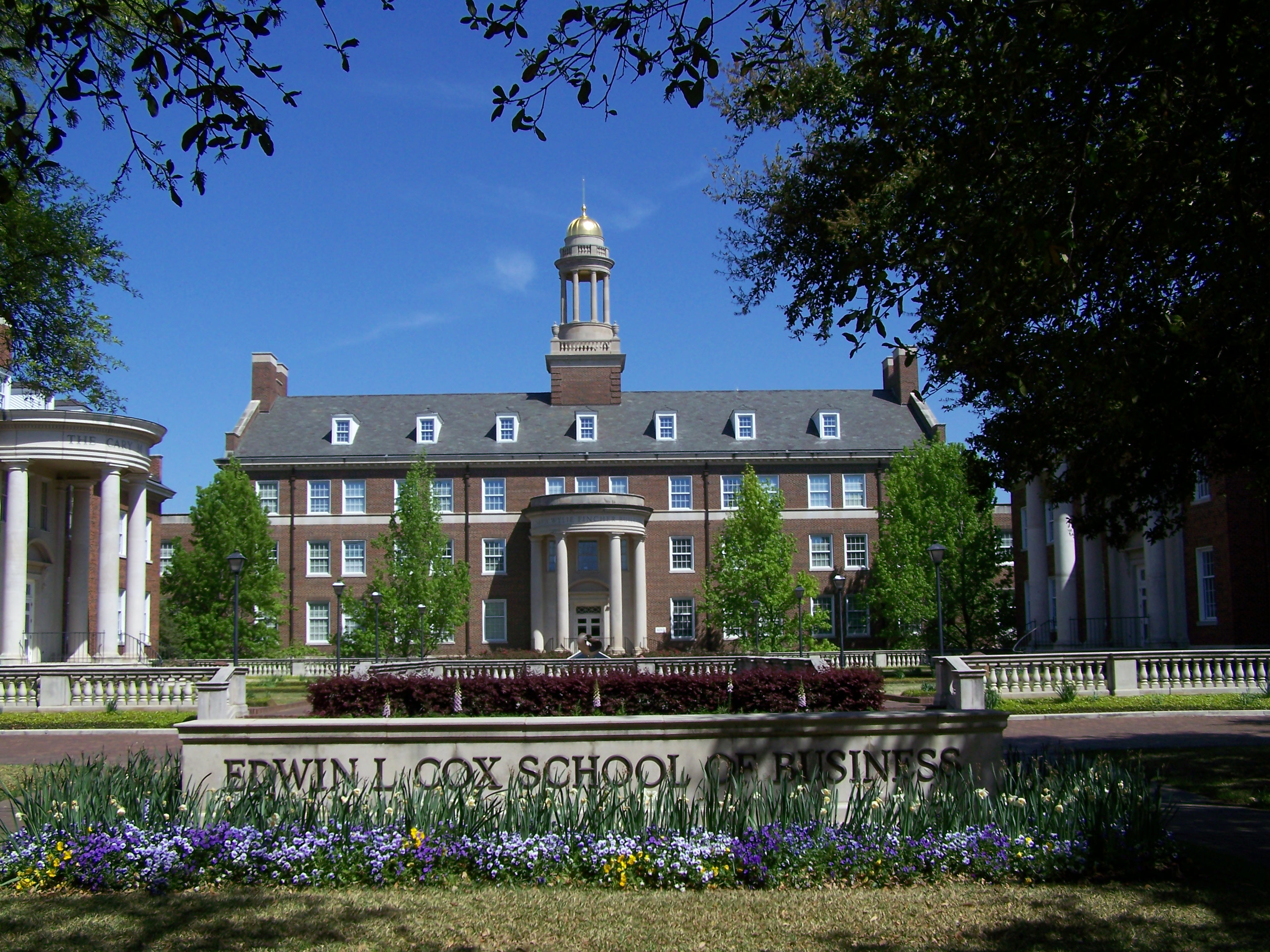
Main building of the Cox School of Business

Its current Dean is Todd Milbourn. Additionally, it offers many business education programs including full-time MBA, its largest program, BBA, MBA Professional (Part-Time), Executive MBA, Master of Science in Management, Master of Science in Business Analytics and non-degree Executive Education. It is home to the Caruth Institute for Entrepreneurship, Business Leadership Center (BLC), Maguire Energy Institute, and American Airlines Global Leadership Program (AAGLP) as well as an Associate Board Executive Mentoring Program. It has an international alumni network with chapters in more than twenty countries.

The Cox School is accredited by the Association to Advance Collegiate Schools of Business (AACSB).

Business school rankings

U.S. MBA Rankings
- Bloomberg (2025): 27

== Notable SMU Cox alumni ==
- Gabriel Barbier-Mueller – Founder and CEO, Harwood International
- Betsy Boze (MBA) – CEO and Dean, Kent State University Stark Campus
- Deborah Coonts – American novelist and lawyer
- Robert H. Dedman, Jr. – President and CEO, ClubCorp
- Robert H. Dedman, Sr. – Founder and CEO, ClubCorp
- David B. Dillon – President and chairman, The Kroger Co.
- Bob Dudley, BP executive in charge of Deepwater Horizon oil spill
- J. Lindsay Embrey – chairman and CEO, First Continental Enterprises Inc., and Embrey Enterprises Inc.
- Gerald J. Ford – Dallas-based billionaire
- Aart J. de Geus – Co-founder, chairman and CEO, Synopsys
- Art Greenhaw – Founder and producer, Art Greenhaw Records, Grammy Award-Winning record label
- Donald Holmquest – CEO, California RHIO
- Thomas W. Horton (MBA 1985) – Chairman of AMR and American Airlines
- Clark Hunt – chairman of the board of the National Football League's Kansas City Chiefs and a founding investor-owner in Major League Soccer
- Clark Hunt – chairman of the board and a founding investor-owner in Major League Soccer
- Lamar Hunt – Founder of the American Football League and owner of the Kansas City Chiefs
- Helen LaKelly Hunt – Founder of The Sister Fund
- Ray Lee Hunt – chairman and CEO, Hunt Oil Company
- Colette Kress – CFO, Nvidia
- Harold MacDowell – CEO, TDIndustries
- John H. Matthews
- Blake Mycoskie – founder of TOMS Shoes
- Robert Mosbacher, Jr. – Houston businessman, President, Mosbacher Energy Company, Overseas Private Investment Corporation
- Erle A. Nye – chairman and CEO, TXU
- William J. O'Neil – Founder of the business newspaper Investors Business Daily
- Eckhard Pfeiffer (MBA) – former CEO of Compaq
- Edward B. Rust Jr. (MBA) – chairman of the board and chief executive officer of State Farm Mutual Automobile Insurance Company
- Mark Shepherd – chairman and CEO, Texas Instruments
- Jeffrey Skilling – Former chairman and CEO of Enron.
- John Tyson (businessman) – chairman, Tyson Foods and grandson of John W. Tyson, Founder of Tyson Foods

== Legal proceedings ==
=== Tenure discrimination lawsuit ===
In 2025, Sean Wang, an assistant professor of accounting at Southern Methodist University's Cox School of Business, filed a federal employment discrimination and retaliation lawsuit against Southern Methodist University concerning his tenure denial in the Cox School's Accounting Department. The lawsuit included allegations involving the department's tenure review process and actions attributed to Hemang Desai, the chair of the Accounting Department. The case, Wang v. Southern Methodist University, was filed in the United States District Court for the Northern District of Texas as a civil rights employment discrimination action under 42 U.S.C. § 1981.

The lawsuit alleged that SMU and the Cox School's Accounting Department discriminated against Wang, who is Chinese-American, by applying tenure standards more favorably to Indian-origin faculty members than to non-Indian faculty members. The complaint cited the Cox School's Promotion and Tenure Manual, which stated that the productivity standard for tenure was "at least four (4) top-tier publications within the six (6) year probationary period."

According to the complaint, since Hemang Desai became a full professor at Cox in 2006, the Accounting Department had granted tenure to all Indian-origin candidates who met the four-publication standard, while denying tenure support to several non-Indian candidates who met the same standard.

The complaint stated that, by the time of his tenure review, Wang had published ten articles in top-tier journals, more than double the publication record of any Cox School accounting faculty member at the time of their tenure application. Wang's SMU faculty profile lists publications in journals including Management Science, the Journal of Financial Economics, the Journal of Accounting and Economics, the Journal of Accounting Research, The Accounting Review, and the Review of Accounting Studies.

The complaint also challenged the department's stated concerns about Wang's "fit," citations, visibility, and research approach. News coverage of the lawsuit reported that Wang said he was confronted by Desai and two other Indian-origin faculty members and encouraged to resign, despite having recently received a successful review and a second contract from SMU.

The complaint cited additional examples of differential treatment within the Accounting Department under Desai's leadership. It alleged that Wang received a critical mid-career review in February 2022 despite having five top-tier publications and strong teaching evaluations, while Sorabh Tomar, an Indian-origin colleague, allegedly received a more favorable review from Desai despite having no publications at the time. The complaint also alleged unequal treatment in office assignments after the department moved into its new building in Spring 2024, stating that Desai, Tomar, and Neil Bhattacharya were assigned prime offices overlooking Bishop Boulevard and the quad, while Liu, Yoon, and Wang were assigned offices on the opposite end of the hallway, away from the preferred locations.

A scheduling order entered in January 2026 set the case for a one-week trial docket beginning February 1, 2027.

== See also ==
- List of United States business school rankings
- List of business schools in the United States
