= Trevor Rees-Jones (businessman) =

Founder of Chief Oil & Gas

- Born: 1951 (age 74–75)
- Education: Highland Park High School
- Alma mater: Dartmouth College; SMU Dedman School of Law
- Occupation: Founder of Chief Oil & Gas
- Spouse: Jan Rees-Jones
- Children: 2 sons

Trevor D. Rees-Jones (born 1951) is an American attorney, billionaire businessman, and philanthropist from Texas. He is the founder of Chief Oil & Gas. He has a net worth of approximately $4.4 billion.

== Early life ==
Trevor D. Rees-Jones was born in 1951. He grew up in University Park, Texas, Dallas, the eldest of three children of Trevor William Rees-Jones (1923–2009) and Billye June Kay of Dallas (1924–2008). He achieved the rank of Eagle Scout out of Boy Scout Troop 70 in 1966. His father was a lawyer with Locke Liddell & Sapp in Dallas. His paternal grandfather, David Rees-Jones, was a Presbyterian minister from Trefor, Wales who immigrated to the United States to serve as a pastor in Oklahoma and Texas. His paternal grandmother, Mary Edith Holmes, was a secretary for William Lever, 1st Viscount Leverhulme from Cheshire, England; she immigrated to the United States with her husband.

Rees-Jones was educated at Highland Park High School, University Park, Dallas. Rees-Jones graduated from Dartmouth College, and studied law at Southern Methodist University's Dedman School of Law, where he received his J.D.

== Career ==
He started his career as a bankruptcy attorney in Dallas. Later, he practiced oil and gas reorganization law with Thompson & Knight.

In 1984, he began pursuing oil and gas investments. He founded Chief Oil & Gas a decade later, in 1994. The company has been active in the Barnett Shale, a geological formation located in the Bend Arch–Fort Worth Basin. He has served as President of the Dallas Petroleum Club and the Dallas Hardhatters Committee (now known as the Dallas Wildcatters Committee).

== Philanthropy ==
In 2006, Trevor Rees-Jones and his wife founded the Rees-Jones Foundation, a private foundation established primarily to support and funding for programs that help improve the quality of life for the people of North Texas. Major recipients of grants from the foundation include the Boy Scouts of America's Circle Ten Council, the Dallas Arboretum, the Dallas Museum of Nature and Science and the Dallas Children's Advocacy Center. The foundation gave grants of over $40 million in both 2008 and 2010.

He served on the board of trustees of his alma mater, Dartmouth College, from 2010 to 2014. He serves on the board of trustees of Texas Christian University and on the board of advisors of its Energy Institute.

The Perot Museum of Nature and Science, created in 2006 by Rees-Jones' friend and business partner, fellow billionaire Ross Perot includes the Jan and Trevor Rees-Jones Exhibition Hall, the subject of a $25 million donation.

Rees-Jones also made a large donation to Parkland Memorial Hospital's campaign for its new facility.

== Political donations ==
Rees-Jones has emerged as a large donor to the Republican Party and gave $1 million to American Crossroads in 2010. In 2015, Rees-Jones and his wife donated $2 million to the presidential candidacy of Jeb Bush.

== Personal life ==
Rees-Jones and his wife Jan live in a 10,700 sq ft house in Dallas, Texas, valued by D Magazine at $13 million in 2011. They attend the Highland Park Presbyterian Church. They are also members of the Dallas Country Club.

Rees-Jones owns Cook Canyon Ranch near Ranger, Texas. In October 2010, he paid the pop singer Jon Bon Jovi to play at a party there. For his 60th birthday party in August 2011, Dan Aykroyd, Jim Belushi and the Blues Brothers Band performed as the opening act, followed by The Eagles, who played a two-hour set. There were 25–30 private jets at the ranch's airstrip.

They have two sons. On 18 October 2014, Trevor Richard Rees-Jones, III, married Jennifer Hall Ebeier of Fort Worth at Rees-Jones' Cook Canyon Ranch.
