= Journal of Air Law and Commerce =

- Discipline: Law
- Language: English
- Edited by: Jenny Hulse

Publication details
- Former name: Journal of Air Law
- History: 1930
- Publisher: Southern Methodist University (United States)
- Frequency: Quarterly

Standard abbreviations
- Bluebook: J. Air L. & Com.
- ISO 4: J. Air Law Commer.

Indexing
- ISSN: 0021-8642

Links
- Journal homepage

The Journal of Air Law and Commerce, founded as the Journal of Air Law, is a peer-reviewed academic journal covering the study of aviation law. It is published by Southern Methodist University (SMU) in conjunction with the university's Dedman School of Law. It is currently led by Editor-in-Chief Jenny Hulse and Managing Editor Cameron King.

== History ==
The intention to publish the journal was announced by the Law Institute in 1929. It was to be dedicated to air law, aeronautical law, air property law and radio law, and compared with international journals dealing with similar topics such as the French Droit Aerien, the German Zeitschrift fur das Luftrecht and the Italian II Diritto Aronautica.

In 1930 journal was established by Fred Dow Fagg, while he was working at Northwestern University, and was associated with Northwestern's Air Law Institute. He remained its editor-in-chief until 1937. After the subject of air law became less popular, however, the Institute suffered from a lack of funding that caused it to wither, eventually leaving the journal as its principal activity. In addition to this, the journal was not published between October 1942 and January 1947. In 1961 it moved to Southern Methodist University from where it is still published.

The creation of the journal resulted in Fagg receiving the Federal Aviation Administration's Distinguished Service Award in 1976.

== Activities ==
The journal holds an annual symposium in conjunction with SMU's Dedman School of Law.
