= Gabrielle Kirk McDonald =

American judge (born 1942)

Gabrielle McDonald

Arbitrator of the Iran–United States Claims Tribunal
- In office 2001–2013
- Succeeded by: Rosemary Barkett

President of the International Criminal Tribunal for the Former Yugoslavia
- In office 19 November 1997 – 17 November 1999
- Preceded by: Antonio Cassese
- Succeeded by: Claude Jorda

Judge of the International Criminal Tribunal for the Former Yugoslavia
- In office 17 November 1993 – 17 November 1999

Judge of the United States District Court for the Southern District of Texas
- In office May 11, 1979 – August 14, 1988
- Appointed by: Jimmy Carter
- Preceded by: Seat established by 92 Stat. 1629
- Succeeded by: John David Rainey

Personal details
- Born: Gabrielle Anne Kirk; April 12, 1942 (age 84) Saint Paul, Minnesota, U.S.
- Education: Boston University; Hunter College; Howard University (LLB)

Gabrielle Anne Kirk McDonald (née Kirk; born April 12, 1942) is an American lawyer and jurist who, until her retirement in October 2013, served as an American arbitrator on the Iran–United States Claims Tribunal seated in The Hague.

She is a former United States district judge of the United States District Court for the Southern District of Texas and a former judge of the International Criminal Tribunal for the former Yugoslavia (ICTY). McDonald was one of the first eleven judges elected by the United Nations to serve on the Yugoslav Tribunal and went on to become its president between 1997 and 1999, the only woman to occupy the position since its founding in 1994.

As the presiding judge in Trial Chamber II, she issued the tribunal's verdict against Duško Tadić, the first international war crimes trial since the Nuremberg Trials and the International Military Tribunal for the Far East. The Tadić case was also the first international war crimes trial involving charges of sexual violence.

== Early life and education ==
McDonald was born in Saint Paul, Minnesota, on April 12, 1942 to Frances Retta (née English) and James G. Kirk Jr.

In her September 1998 interview with St. Paul Magazine, McDonald remembered her mother as an ambitious woman with dreams of pursuing a career in acting and writing. Her father was a World War II veteran and like his father, worked as a dining car waiter for the Northern Pacific Railway. Her parents divorced in 1944, shortly after McDonald's brother, James G. Kirk III was born.

Frances English Kirk soon thereafter moved to New York with her two children. Living in East Harlem, Frances Kirk worked as a secretary for various newspapers, magazines, and publishing houses. When Gabrielle was eight years old, she and her mother moved to Riverdale, New York.

McDonald has spoken about her mother's refusal to accept prejudice and discrimination, which include her confrontation with a racist landlord who wanted to evict Frances from her apartment when he learned her children were African-Americans. Frances Kirk refused to budge. Born of a Swedish mother and an African-American father, Frances was fair-skinned, and many believed she was Caucasian.

At the 2004 Horatio Alger Award short biographical film, McDonald also spoke about an incident where a taxi driver apologized to her mother for the unpleasant smell in his car because a previous passenger had been an African-American. Seeing her mother challenge these incidents taught McDonald early in her life that "you just don't sit back quietly . . . you say something."

The family eventually moved to Teaneck, New Jersey, where McDonald graduated from Teaneck High School in 1959. Tall and athletic, she played field hockey and was president of the girls' leadership club. Her yearbook states that she is one of the "nicest" and "most liked girls" in the class in which there was only one other African-American student. She attended Boston University (1959–61) and Hunter College (1961–63) for her undergraduate education.

In 1963, determined to become a civil rights lawyer, McDonald enrolled at Howard University School of Law. At Howard Law, she worked as a research assistant in her first year and in her second, earned a scholarship from the Ford Foundation.

She went on to serve as secretary of the student bar association and Notes Editor for the Howard Law Journal. She graduated cum laude and first in her class with a Bachelor of Laws.

At the time, there were only 142 African-American women lawyers in the country.

== Career ==
=== NAACP Legal Defense and Education Fund and private practice ===
After graduating from Howard Law, McDonald accepted a staff attorney position with the NAACP Legal Defense and Educational Fund Inc. in New York.

For the next three years, McDonald canvassed Alabama, Mississippi, and Georgia to assist local residents and lawyers with issues involving school desegregation, equal employment, housing, and voting rights. She worked on some of the first plaintiff employment discrimination cases asserting violations of Title VII of the Civil Rights Act of 1964. In 1967, she served as the lead LDF staff attorney in a successful action against a major company for its discriminatory seniority system, which was the first significant plaintiff victory under Title VII since the enactment of the Civil Rights Act.

In 1969, she joined her then-husband attorney Mark T. McDonald in solo practice in Houston, Texas. The Civil Rights Act of 1964 had paved the way for lawsuits based on racial discrimination, and together, the McDonalds built a reputation for pursuing plaintiff discrimination cases against major corporations and unions with significant operations in Texas. The firm's largest success came in 1976 when the McDonalds won a case against a multinational company and its union on behalf of 400 black workers for $1.2 million in back wages. As Chris Dixie, a union-side lawyer in Houston who often opposed McDonald told The Houston Post in 1978, "She must be the best in the South, if not better." She was one of the few African-American lawyers who appeared regularly in federal courts in Texas in the early 1970s.

=== Academia ===
In 1970, while maintaining her private practice, McDonald began pursuing what would become a lifelong passion: teaching law. Her first venture into academia was running the Legal Aid Clinic and teaching Trusts at Thurgood Marshall School of Law, Texas Southern University. As assistant professor of law, she went on to teach several courses at Texas Southern concurrent with her practice, including Federal Civil Procedure, Evidence, and Employment Discrimination Law. She served as a lecturer at the University of Texas School of Law in Austin, Texas, and as a professor of law at St. Mary's University School of Law in San Antonio, Texas.

McDonald returned to academia after she left the federal judiciary in 1988; she taught Civil Procedure, and Race, Racism & American Law at St. Mary's University School of Law. After she returned to Houston in 1993, she taught several courses at the Thurgood Marshall School of Law, including Legal Methods, Federal Courts, and a seminar on the jurisprudence of Associate Supreme Court Justice Thurgood Marshall.

=== Federal judicial service and private practice ===
McDonald was nominated by President Jimmy Carter on February 27, 1979, to the United States District Court for the Southern District of Texas, to a new seat created by 92 Stat. 1629. She was confirmed by the United States Senate on May 10, 1979, and received her commission on May 11, 1979, when she was 37 years of age. She was the first African-American appointed to the federal bench in Texas and only the third African-American woman to be appointed to be a federal judge in the United States. Her service was terminated on August 14, 1988, due to resignation.

During her tenure on the bench, McDonald ruled on a number of high-profile cases. One of these cases involved Vietnamese shrimpers and the Ku Klux Klan. In that case, the Grand Dragon of the Klan attempted to disqualify her from the case, arguing that her race would prevent her from being impartial. She refused to recuse herself, stating in 1984, that "... if my race is enough to disqualify me from hearing this case, then I must disqualify myself as well from a substantial portion of cases on my docket ... an action that would cripple my efforts to fulfill my oath as a federal judge." She told the defendant, during the highly publicized hearing in a courtroom that included robed Klansmen, "You are not entitled to a judge of your choosing but one who will be fair. And I will do that." At the time, Daniel Hedges, United States attorney for the Southern District of Texas, praised her for "not permitting her civil rights background to cloud her judgment as a federal judge. She was always evenhanded."

After resigning from the bench in 1988, McDonald joined the law firm of Matthes & Granscomb and in 1992, became counsel to Walker & Satterhwaite. She served as special counsel to the chairman on human rights for Freeport-McMoRan Copper & Gold, Inc.

=== International Criminal Tribunal for the Former Yugoslavia ===
In February 1993, the community of nations, through United Nations Security Council Resolution 808, decided to establish a war crimes tribunal to prosecute persons responsible for serious violations of international humanitarian law committed in the former Yugoslavia since 1991.

The Department of State submitted her name to the United Nations as a judge to the newly formed International Criminal Tribunal for the former Yugoslavia (ICTY), which had been created by another Security Council resolution in May 1993. The United Nations General Assembly selected a total of eleven judges, including McDonald, to serve on the Tribunal; Judge McDonald was the sole American on the court and one of only two women. She was elected by the largest number of votes.

In late 1993, McDonald and her colleagues began drafting the Tribunal's rules of procedure and evidence and following an intensive two-month rule-drafting period, in February 1994, the judges adopted the ICTY's Rules of Procedure and Evidence.

She first served as presiding judge in the Tribunal's Trial Chamber II and in this role, conducted evidence and deferral hearings in a number of cases, and also heard the historic case of Duško Tadić, the first war crimes trial since the Nuremberg Trials, the series of military tribunals held by the Allied forces of World War II that prosecuted, in 1945–46, members of the political, military, and economic leadership of Nazi Germany.

Since the Tadić case was the Tribunal's first trial, the Trial Chamber was breaking new ground. As McDonald stated in a later interview, this gave her and her colleagues the opportunity to "use the law creatively". During the course of the trial, a number of important procedural and other issues had to be resolved, including whether the Tribunal was bound by the decisions of other international bodies, how to maintain the balance between the need to protect victims and witnesses and sustaining the accused's right to a public hearing, laying down special rules for evidence from victims and witnesses in cases of sexual assault, general principles for a grant of anonymity to witnesses, providing guidelines relating to the safe-conduct of witnesses, and to the provision of testimony be video link; and whether hearsay evidence was to be admitted. McDonald's and her colleagues' rulings on all these issues played an important part in establishing precedents for the Tribunal's practice and procedure.

The Tadić trial lasted almost a year during which Judge McDonald and the panel she presided reviewed hundreds of documentary evidence and heard from numerous witnesses. In May 1997, Tadić was found guilty of committing crimes against humanity, namely, persecution on political, racial and/or religious grounds, and inhumane acts; violations of the laws or customs of war, namely, cruel treatment. The ICTY's findings in the Tadić case were significant in that they proved under international law the Serb policy of "ethnic cleansing" and set a precedent for further prosecutions. International commentators noted that, as the presiding judge, McDonald skillfully balanced her concern for the victims of the war crimes, especially rape victims, with scrupulous fairness and respect for the rights of the defendants. McDonald also presided over Trial Chamber II in evidentiary hearings in the Ivica Rajić case, the deferral hearings in the Lašva Valley and Dražen Erdemović cases; she was also in charge of proceedings in the Slavko Dokmanović case, presided over the hearing of preliminary motions in the Čelebići and Blaškić cases, and sat as a member of the Appeals Chamber in the Erdemović case.

On May 20, 1997, McDonald was re-elected for a second term, and on November 19, 1997, was nominated and elected by her fellow judges as the president of the ICTY.

On her election, she set several goals for the International Tribunal: the first concerned the infrastructure of the Tribunal – one courtroom was not sufficient for the Tribunal's functioning. Soon, the Tribunal's premises were adapted to include two more Trial Chambers. Second, there were insufficient judges to try the growing number of persons that were held in detention. McDonald went to the United Nations Security Council and successfully argued for the hiring of three more judges. Third, was to secure changes in the rules relating to pre-trial procedures because of the increasing number of detainees and the length of trials. Thus, the Rules of Procedure and Evidence were amended to provide for stronger case management by the judges during the pre-trial phase of the proceedings.

She established a Working Group on Trial Practices with a mandate to make practical recommendations that would reduce the length of trials. She also promoted the "Outreach Programme" to explain the work of the Tribunal to the peoples of the former Yugoslavia.

The Appeals Chamber for the International Tribunal also functions as the Appeals Chamber of the International Criminal Tribunal for Rwanda (ICTR). As president, she thus presided over the Appeals Chambers of both Tribunals and made a number of visits to Arusha, Tanzania, the seat of the Rwanda Tribunal.

One of her last acts as president was to preside over the Appeals Chamber's first decision in the Jean-Bosco Barayagwiza case, which concerned the rights of the accused in the context of numerous pre-trial delays.

When President McDonald left the Tribunal in 1999, she had led the Tribunal through a pivotal stage in its history as it made the transition to a fully functioning international criminal court. The late Antonio Cassese, her colleague and the first president of the ICTY, wrote in the War Report that she "is the best that America can offer: she is straightforward, direct, intelligent and hard-working; . . . she is firm in her conviction; she is principled but she is not jingoistic."

=== Iran-United States Claims Tribunal ===
In 2001, McDonald was called to serve another historic tribunal, the Iran-United States Claims Tribunal, as one of three American Arbitrators. The International Claims Tribunal, also based in The Hague, was established by agreement between the United States and Iran in 1981, and has, since then, adjudicated claims by United States nationals for compensation for assets nationalized by the Iranian government, and claims by the governments against each other. McDonald is the only woman among the panel of nine arbitrators.

== Publications ==
McDonald's publications include Substantive and Procedural Aspects of International Criminal Law, The Experience of International and National Courts (edited with Olivia Swaak-Goldman; The International Criminal Tribunals: Crime And Punishment In The International Arena; Reflections on The Contributions of The International Criminal Tribunal For The Former Yugoslavia; Problems, Obstacles and Achievements of The ICTY; In Memoriam, Justice Thurgood Marshall; War Crimes Tribunals: The Record and the Prospects; International Support For International Criminal Tribunals And An International Criminal Court; The Eleventh Annual Waldemar A. Solf Lecture: The Changing Nature of The Laws of War; Friedmann Award Address Crimes of Sexual Violence: The Experience of The International Criminal Tribunal.

== Awards ==
McDonald has received numerous awards and honors, including the National Bar Association's first Equal Justice and Ronald Brown International Law Awards; the American Society of International Law's Goler T. Butcher Award for Human Rights; the American Bar Association Commission on Women in the Profession's Margaret Brent Women Lawyers of Achievement Award; the Open Society Institute's first Women Groundbreakers in International Justice Award (2007); and the 2008 Dorothy Height Lifetime Achievement Award.

She has received the Doctor of Law Honoris Causa from various institutions – the Georgetown University Law Center, the University of Notre Dame, Howard University, the Stetson College of Law and Amherst College. In a 1999 ceremony at the United States Supreme Court hosted by former Associate Justice Sandra Day O'Connor, McDonald received the Leadership Award from the Central Eastern European Law Initiative, now consolidated under the ABA Rule of Law Initiative.

== Bibliography ==
- Profile of Gabrielle Kirk McDonald, Human Rights Brief 7, no. 3 (Spring 2000)
- Living History Interview with Judge Gabrielle Kirk McDonald, 10 Transnat'l L. & Contemp. Probs. 643 (2000)
- Lessons from the Killing Fields; Judge Gabrielle Kirk McDonald and the Bosnian War Crimes Tribunal in Holland, Felde, Kitty, MPLS-St. Paul Magazine (September 1998)
- Weitzman, Lisa, Contemporary Black Biography, McDonald, Gabrielle Kirk, 1942- (1999)
- Michael P. Scharf, The Prosecutor v. Duško Tadić: An Appraisal of the First International War Crimes Trial (1997)
- Fifth Annual Report of the International Tribunal for the Prosecution of Persons Responsible for Serious Violations of International Humanitarian Law Committed in the Territory of the Former Yugoslavia Since 1991, President McDonald, (27 July 1998)
- Sixth Annual Report of the International Tribunal for the Prosecution of Persons Responsible for Serious Violations of International Humanitarian Law Committed in the Territory of the Former Yugoslavia Since 1991, President McDonald, (25 Aug. 1999)
- American Society of International Law and the International Judicial Academy, Volume I, Issue 1 (March 2006).
- Substantive and Procedural Aspects of International Criminal Law, The Experience of International and National Courts (eds. Gabrielle Kirk McDonald and Olivia Swaak-Goldman)
- Horatio Alger Assn., Distinguished Americans (2004)

== See also ==
- List of African-American federal judges
- List of African-American jurists
- List of first women lawyers and judges in Texas

== Sources ==
Legal offices
Preceded by Seat established by 92 Stat. 1629	Judge of the United States District Court for the Southern District of Texas; 1979–1988	Succeeded by John David Rainey
