= J. Lindsay Embrey =

James Lindsay Embrey, Jr., also known as J. Lindsay Embrey (September 23, 1925 - November 11, 2005) was an American real estate developer and philanthropist. He was a primary benefactor of Southern Methodist University in Dallas, Texas. He served as a member of the board of trustees of Southern Methodist University from 1970 to 1987. In 1978, he established an endowment for students majoring in engineering at the university. As of 2013, this endowment has provided scholarships for over 2,000 engineering students. In 1991, he was named emeritus of the board of trustees.

== Early life ==
James Lindsay Embrey, Jr. was born in 1925 in Gainesville, Texas. He was the son of James Lindsay and Margaret (née Marsh) Embrey. His great-grandfather was James Menees Lindsay (1835-1919), who migrated to Cooke County, Texas, from Tennessee in 1857 and became a real estate developer, judge, and philanthropist. He graduated with honors from Gainesville High School. He received a Bachelor of Science degree in civil engineering from Southern Methodist University in 1945. In 1947, after completing his service in the V-12 Navy College Training Program, he received a Bachelor's degree in Business Administration from the university. He was President of Phi Delta Theta, a member of Cycen Fjodr, and lettered as a varsity guard for the school's basketball team.

== Professional background ==
Land development

In the mid-1950s, he developed the city Richardson, Texas, with George Underwood, Jr. as well as the North Texas Technology corridor. He later served as Chair of First Continental Enterprises, while co-owning several shopping centers and apartment complexes.

Philanthropy

Embrey sat on the board of trustees of Southern Methodist University from 1970 to 1987. He was the chair of both the university's alumni board and Mustang Club, as well as president of the university's alumni association. He also served on the university's Athletic Forum Board and the School of Engineering's executive board.In 1991, he was named emeritus of the board of trustees.

In 1978, he established an endowment for students majoring in engineering at Southern Methodist University. As of 2013, the endowment has provided scholarships for over 2,000 engineering students. He also donated funds to assist with the construction of the Jerry R. Junkins Engineering Building and the Gerald J. Ford Stadium.

In 2003, the J. Lindsay Embrey Engineering Building, located on the Southern Methodist University campus was built, following his donation of $7.5 million.

== Honors and awards ==
In 1999, Embrey was honored with the Mustang Award from the university. In 2004, he was the recipient of the Hall of Leaders Distinguished Alumni Award from the School of Engineering.

== Personal life ==
Embrey was married to Bobbie G. (née Sherwood) Embrey. He had two daughters from his previous marriage to Grace Nelson Embrey, Gayle Nelson Embrey and Lauren Marsh Embrey. In 2008, his daughters established the Human Rights Education Program at Southern Methodist University, run by Professor Rick Halperin. In 2009, they also produced the documentary Playground against the child sex trade in the United States. Both daughters continue to run the Embrey Family Foundation, established by their father prior to his death.

Embrey died on November 11, 2005, in Dallas, Texas.
