= Yuto Horigome =

Yuto Horigome may refer to:

- Yuto Horigome (footballer) (堀米 悠斗, born 1994), Japanese footballer
- Yuto Horigome (skateboarder) (堀米 雄斗, born 1999), Japanese skateboarder
