= Chief Oil & Gas =

US hydrocarbon exploration company

Chief Oil and Gas
- Industry: Petroleum industry
- Founded: 1994; 32 years ago
- Founder: Trevor Rees-Jones
- Defunct: March 9, 2022; 4 years ago
- Headquarters: Dallas, Texas, US

Chief Oil & Gas was a company involved in hydrocarbon exploration. In March 2022, it was acquired by Expand Energy. It was the second-largest producer in the Barnett Shale.

== History ==
The company was founded in Dallas in 1994 by Trevor Rees-Jones.

In June 2006, the company sold a leasehold interest in 169,000 net acres with proved reserves of 617 billion cubic feet of natural gas equivalent to Devon Energy for $2.2 billion in cash. It also sold midstream assets to Crosstex Energy for $480 million in cash.

Chief began drilling in the Marcellus Formation in 2007.

In August 2008, the company sold assets to Quicksilver Resources.

In September 2009, the company entered into a joint venture with Enerplus for development in the Marcellus. By that time, the company had drilled 31 wells in the formation.

In December 2010, Chief sold 15 producing wells and 50,000 net acres in Pennsylvania to Exco Resources for $459 million.

In 2011, the company sold a leasehold interest in 228,000 net acres to Chevron Corporation.

In December 2013, the company bought property in the Marcellus from Expand Energy for $500 million.

In March 2022, Expand Energy acquired the company for $2.2 billion.

== Controversies ==
=== Political contributions by the founder ===
In October 2010, Trevor Rees-Jones contributed $50,000 to then-gubernatorial candidate and eventual winner Tom Corbett, which some believe was a payoff in exchange for no severance tax and the repeal of environmental policies created to protect the environment from natural gas drilling.

=== Environmental issues ===
In January 2011, a subsidiary of the company was fined $34,000 by the Pennsylvania Department of Environmental Protection for releasing approximately 25,200 gallons of hydrostatic testing water into the Big Run watershed in August 2010 at a pipeline project in Penn Township, Lycoming County, Pennsylvania.

In June 2011, the company was fined $180,000 by the Pennsylvania Department of Environmental Protection for a hydraulic oil spill and the failure to maintain a drill pit at a natural gas well in Somerset County.

In the first six months of 2010, Chief Oil & Gas was cited for 78 violations by the Pennsylvania DEP, more than any other Marcellus shale driller in the state and with the highest ratio of violations at 3.5 per well.

In June 2010, a well blowout and fire at a Chief-owned site injured seven contractors in Moundsville, West Virginia, and burned for days. No one from the emergency response crews had been given instruction on how to fight a well blowout and the burning site was found abandoned when the responders arrived.

In 2014, the company was fined $13,000 after drilling a well into another well and then attempting to hide the event from regulators.
