= Virgin America =

Low-cost airline of the United States (2004–2018)

Virgin America Inc.
| IATA | ICAO | Call sign |
|---|---|---|
| VX | VRD | REDWOOD |
- Founded: January 26, 2004
- Commenced operations: August 8, 2007
- Ceased operations: April 24, 2018 (merged into Alaska Airlines)
- AOC #: VQIA199L
- Hubs: Los Angeles; San Francisco
- Focus cities: Dallas–Love
- Frequent-flyer program: eleVAte
- Fleet size: 67
- Destinations: 31
- Parent company: Alaska Air Group (2016–2018)
- Headquarters: Burlingame, California, U.S.
- Key people: C. David Cush (CEO); Donald J. Carty (chairman); Richard Branson (minority owner)
- Revenue: ▲US$1.529 billion (2015)
- Operating income: ▲US$177.2 million (2015)
- Net income: ▲US$340.5 million (2015)

Virgin America Inc. was a low-cost airline headquartered in the San Francisco Bay Area city of Burlingame, California. It primarily focused on operating low-fare, higher-quality service between cities on the West Coast of the United States and other major metropolitan areas. It operated both domestic and international flights, with hubs in San Francisco and Los Angeles as well as smaller focus city operations at Love Field in Dallas, Texas, and New York–JFK.

Originally established in 2004, the airline began operations in 2007 as an independent airline company using branding licensed from the United Kingdom–based Virgin Group, which also controls the brand of the Virgin Atlantic and Virgin Australia airlines. The Alaska Air Group acquired Virgin America in April 2016, at a cost of approximately $4 billion and continued to operate Virgin America under its own name and brand until the airline was fully merged into Alaska Airlines on April 24, 2018.

== History ==
=== Founding (2004–2007) ===
In early 2004, Virgin Group announced its intention to found a United States–based, low-fare airline called "Virgin USA". At the time, Virgin USA expected flights to begin by mid 2005. After considering several key areas, the San Francisco Bay Area was chosen as the location of its flight operations center and later as its corporate headquarters. The airline changed its name from "Virgin USA" to "Virgin America" and due to the difficulty in finding U.S. investors willing to gamble on a new airline in an already congested industry, the launch date was pushed back from mid 2005 to early 2006.

Virgin America secured U.S. investors Black Canyon Capital and Cyrus Capital Partners in late 2005. Once the new owners were on board, Virgin's General Counsel submitted the required U.S. Department of Transportation certificate application on December 9, 2005. Unfortunately, despite significant public support for the new California-based airline, the approval process was mired in a debate between the supportive city and state representatives from California and New York and the opposing national aviation labor union, Air Line Pilots Association, as well as a potential competitor Continental Airlines. The review of Virgin America's application was prolonged due to this opposition, which claimed Virgin America, a subsidiary of the United Kingdom–based Virgin Group, would not be under U.S. ownership or control. The application was initially denied by the Department of Transportation on December 27, 2006.

In order to achieve the necessary approval, Virgin America's General Counsel David Pflieger and CEO Fred Reid filed a revised application that proposed a restructuring of the airline in January 2007; voting shares would be held by a Department of Transportation–approved trust and only two Virgin Group directors would be on the eight-person board. Additionally, Virgin America was open to removing Richard Branson from the airline's board of directors and possibly removing the "Virgin" brand from the title altogether. Virgin America was tentatively cleared to fly by the U.S. Department of Transportation on March 20, 2007, on the condition that the airline would alter its business structure, including the limitation of foreign ownership shares to 25% and the replacement of Fred Reid (who had been hired by Virgin Group). The airline protested the stipulation concerning Reid's removal to the federal regulators, arguing that the other stipulations ensured that the business would not be ruled by foreign interests. The Department of Transportation's final agreement allowed Reid to remain involved with Virgin America until February 2008, after which he was required to leave the company.

=== Virgin Group operations (2007–2016) ===
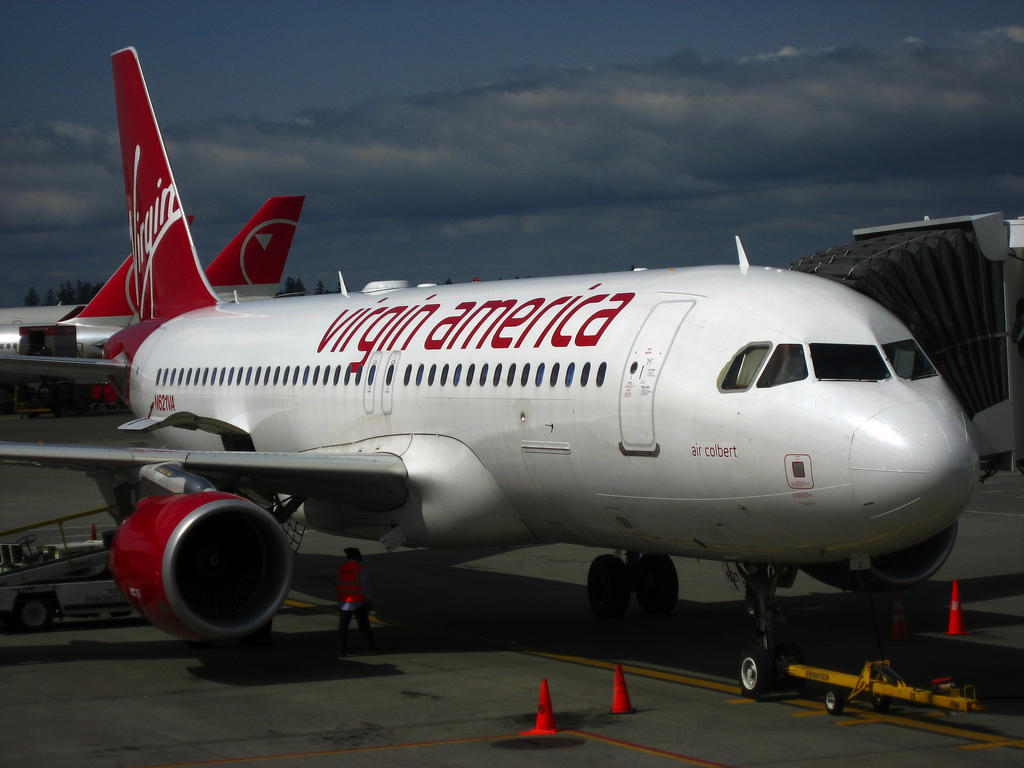
"Air Colbert", the aircraft used on Virgin America's inaugural flight, at Seattle–Tacoma International Airport

Virgin America began selling tickets in July 2007. On August 8, 2007, the airline made its inaugural New York and Los Angeles to San Francisco flights — the aircraft was named "Air Colbert", after comedian Stephen Colbert. In December 2007, C. David Cush replaced Reid as CEO of the airline. From the beginning of operations, Virgin America reported losses, beginning with $270 million in its first month, until the third quarter of 2010, when it achieved its first profit of $7.5 million.

On May 21, 2009, Virgin America became the first U.S. airline to offer Wi-Fi access on every flight, via Gogo Inflight Internet. Between November 10, 2009, and January 15, 2010, the airline offered free WiFi with a subsidy from Google. On December 17, 2014, Virgin America announced that it would offer faster fleet-wide ATG-4 in-flight WiFi service from Gogo, with speeds three times faster than the first generation system.

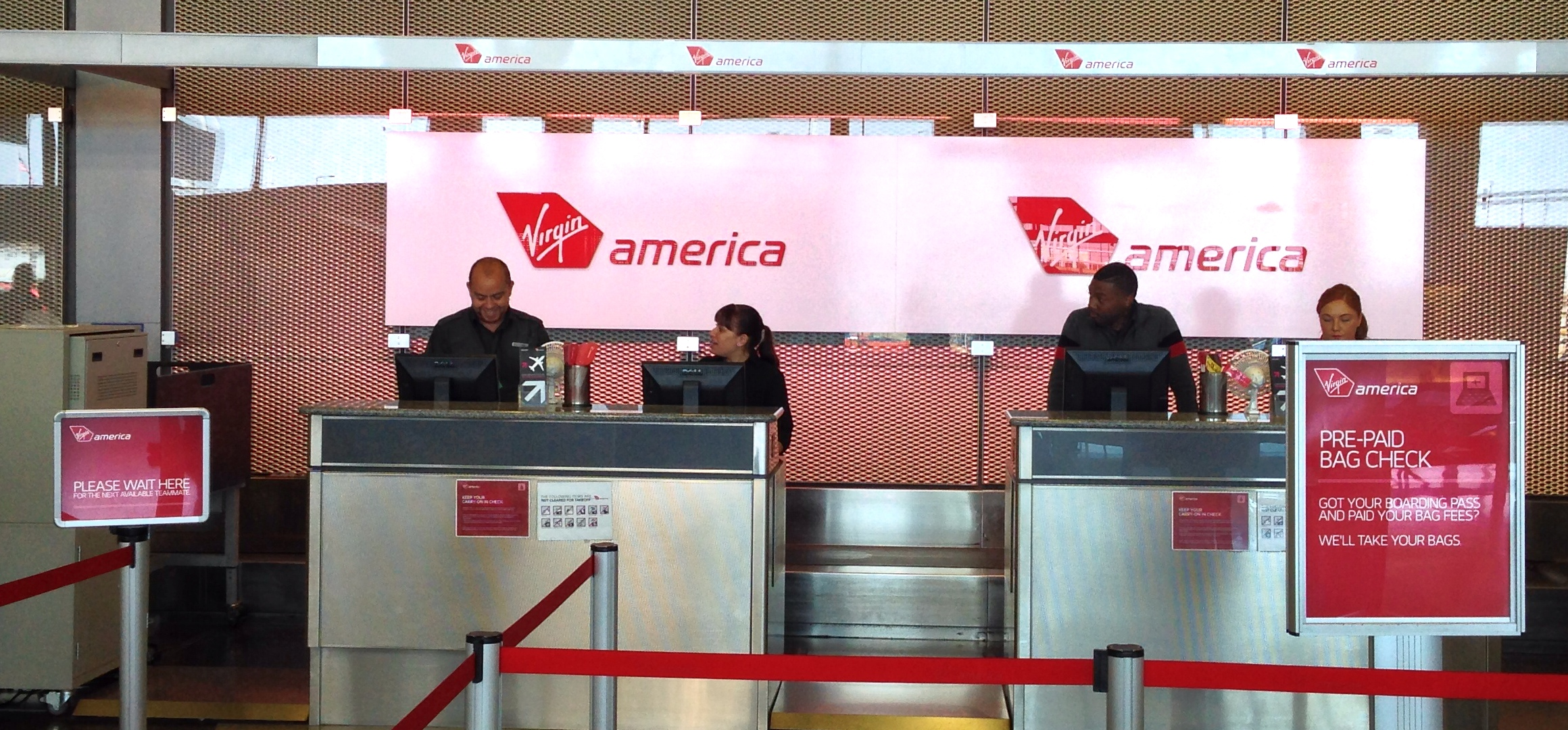
Virgin America's check-in area at Chicago O'Hare International Airport

In March 2010, Virgin America announced its intention to start flying to Toronto from Los Angeles and San Francisco, making it the airline's first international destination. Following the Department of Transportation's approval of Virgin America's proposal to fly to Canada, international service began with flights to Toronto Pearson International Airport on June 29, 2010. However, due to high operating costs, response from competitors, slower growth than anticipated, and higher demand for Dallas/Fort Worth, Virgin America terminated Toronto service on April 6, 2011. Virgin America began its service to Dallas/Fort Worth International Airport in December 2010, and continued until after the repeal of the Wright Amendment in October 2014, when the airline leased two gates and established a focus city at Dallas Love Field and enhanced the number of connecting destinations. As a result, Virgin America transported almost 31,000 passengers through Dallas Love Field in the first month, achieving 3.58% market share at Dallas Love Field.

Virgin America announced in January 2011 a firm order for sixty new Airbus A320 aircraft, including thirty new Airbus A320neos, that would be delivered starting in 2016, as a formal expansion of an initial commitment made by Richard Branson at the Farnborough Airshow in July 2010, though in November 2012 the airline deferred delivery of the aircraft to 2020. In April 2011, Virgin America's hub at San Francisco International Airport relocated to the newly remodeled Terminal 2, sharing the gates with American Airlines. In late October 2011, the airline migrated to Sabre's global distribution system (GDS) that handles reservations, frequent-flier accounts, flight operations data and crew scheduling. Difficulties with the changeover sparked widespread customer complaints, due to early technical malfunctions surrounding the program. On December 12, 2012, Virgin America opened their first airport lounge, the Virgin America Loft, at Los Angeles International Airport.

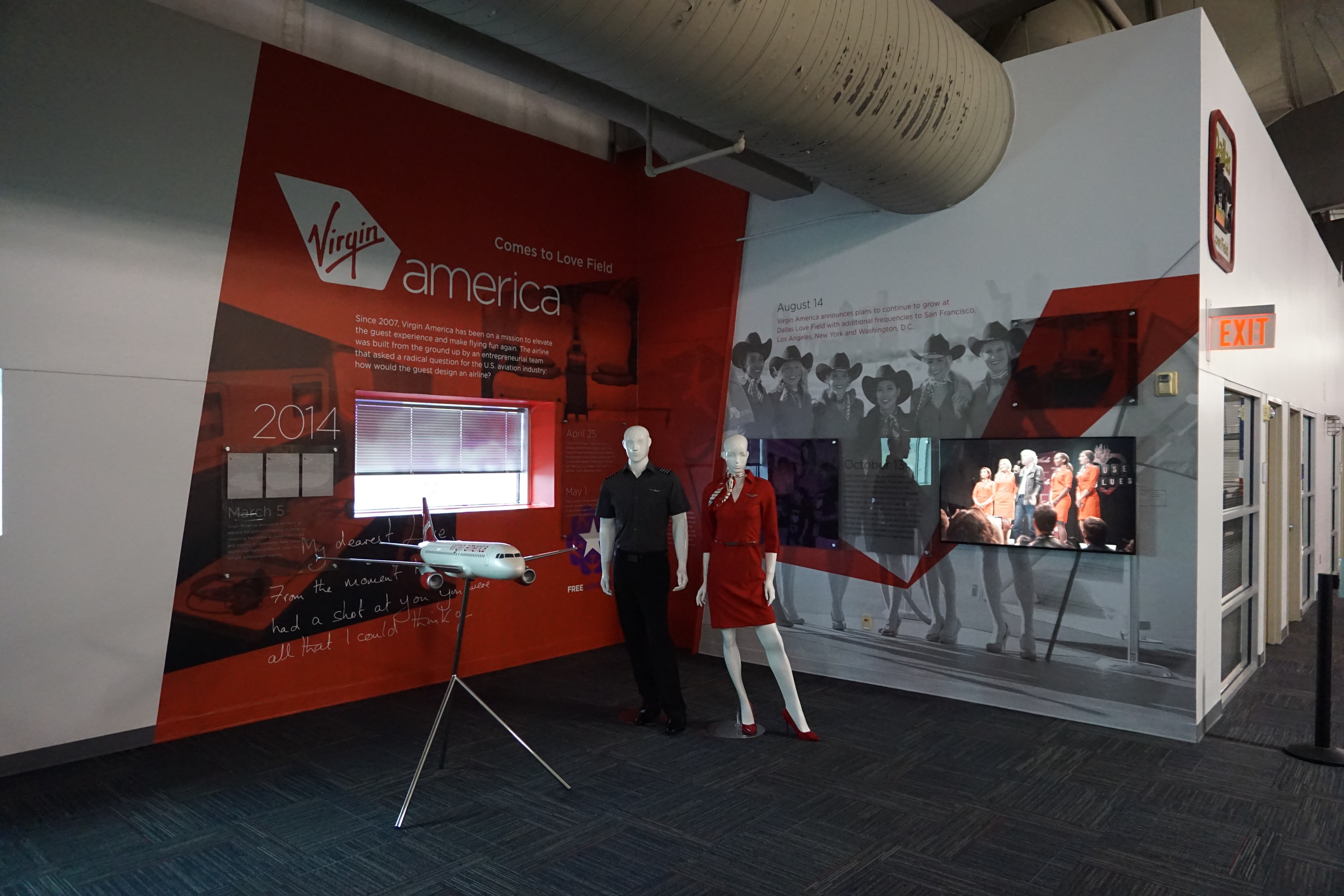
The Virgin America exhibit at the Frontiers of Flight Museum at Dallas Love Field

=== Alaska Airlines acquisition (2016–2018) ===
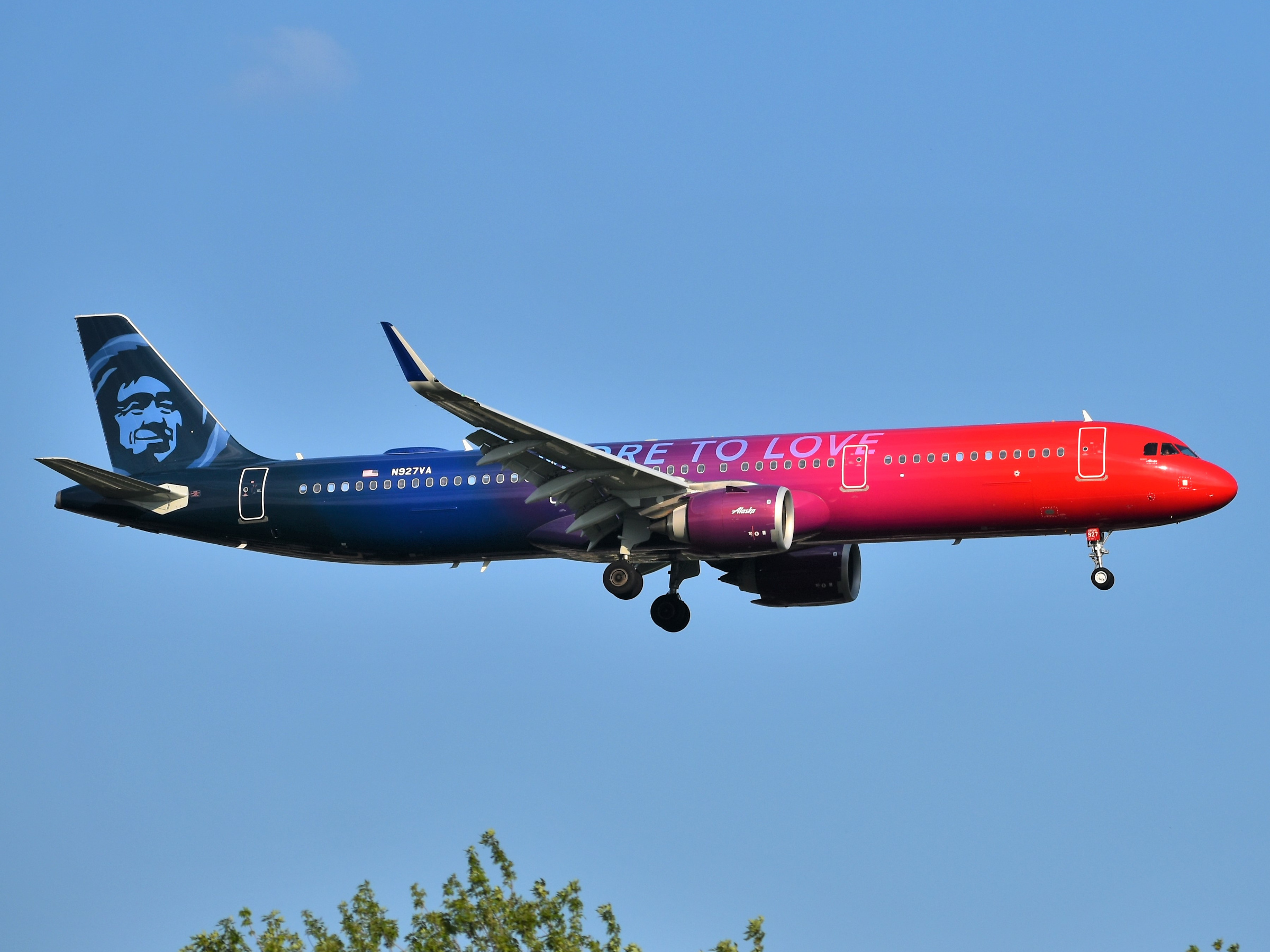
An Airbus A321neo acquired by Alaska Airlines from Virgin America in the "More to Love" livery, depicting the acquisition of Virgin America by Alaska Airlines

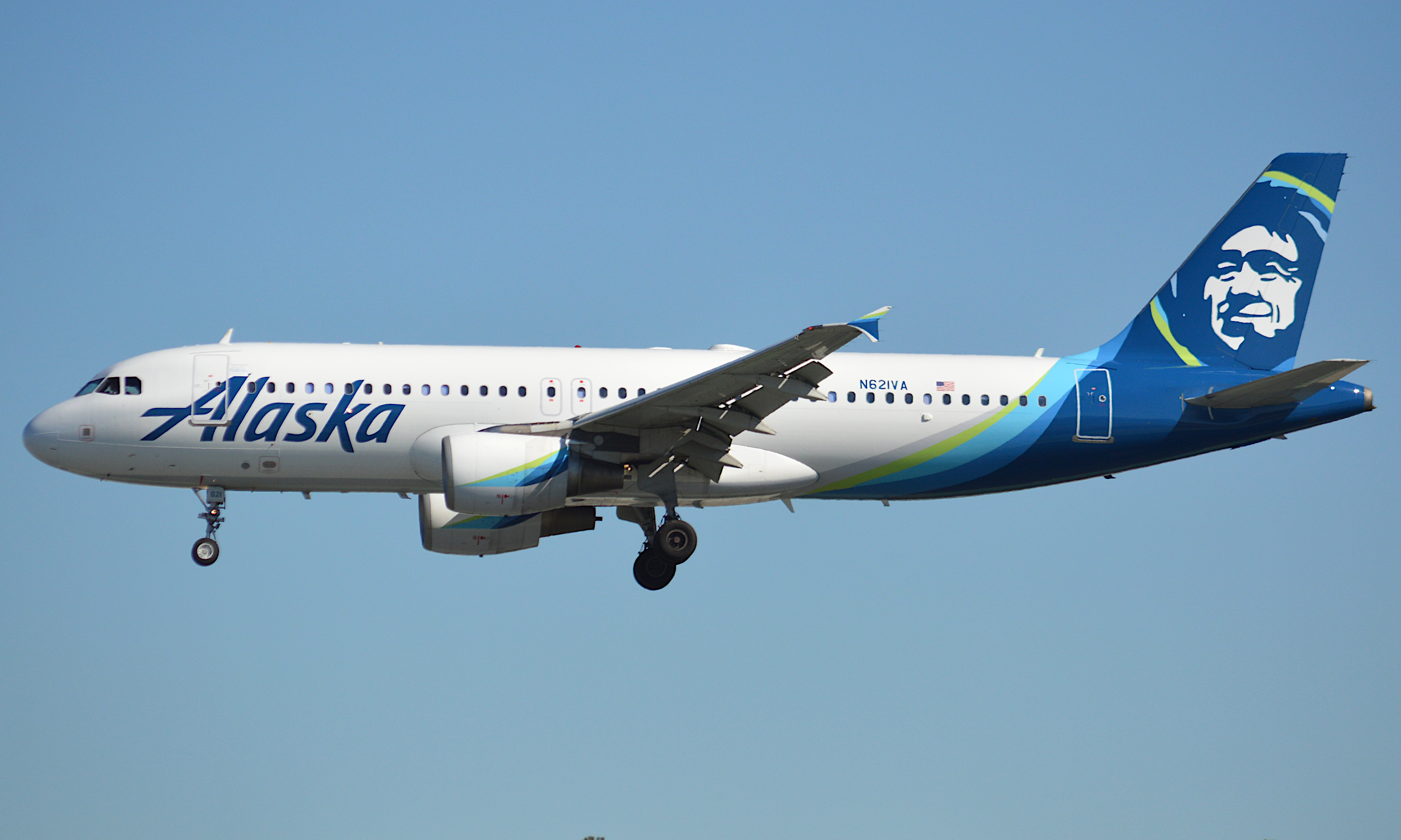
An Airbus A320 repainted in the Alaska Airlines livery

Virgin America was lsited the Nasdaq exchange on November 14, 2014, raising $307 million.

A number of airlines interested in a takeover of Virgin America approached the airline in late 2015, prompting Virgin America to correspond with an undisclosed financial adviser about how and if to proceed with a sale. Alaska Air Group and JetBlue were the two most interested companies to make offers to purchase the airline from Virgin Group. In December 2015, Alaska was interested at $44.75 per share, before JetBlue manifested its interest in February 2016. A bidding war ensued culminating on March 31 and April 1 at $57 per share, 47% higher than the day's closure at $38.9. On April 4, 2016, Alaska Air Group announced that it had agreed to buy Virgin America for $2.6 billion. Including debt and aircraft leases, the transaction was worth approximately $4 billion. Had the merger agreement been terminated by Virgin America, they would have been contractually obligated to pay Alaska Air Group a termination fee equal to $78.5 million.

Virgin America's founder Richard Branson expressed disappointment with the merger between Alaska Airlines and the airline he founded. In July 2016, Virgin America's shareholders approved the merger, leaving the approval by the United States Department of Justice as the only foreseeable hurdle. In September 2016, a lawsuit was filed against Alaska Airlines by consumers to block the merger between the two carriers, which the Alaska Air Group settled in court in December 2016. Subsequently, the Department of Justice approved the acquisition, which was completed on December 14. Following the acquisition, the former chief financial officer of Alaska Airlines, Peter Hunt, became the president of Virgin America, while the former chief operating officer and president of Alaska Airlines, Ben Minicucci, became the chief executive officer.

Virgin America was the launch customer for the Airbus A321neo, with the airline placing a firm order for 10 aircraft through leasing company GE Capital Aviation Services. The first A321neo was delivered in Hamburg to Virgin America and entered service on May 31, 2017; a total of five A321neos were delivered to Virgin in 2017 and five in 2018. In early February 2017, Alaska Air Group said it was working with GE on an arrangement where it would not take delivery of all 10 ordered jets, in favor of keeping a predominantly Boeing fleet. A presentation given by Alaska Airlines' chief financial officer in March 2017 indicated that Alaska would take delivery of all 10 leased A321neos, and would absorb and operate Virgin America's existing A319 and A320 fleet through at least 2024.

As part of the merger, some of Virgin's amenities would be integrated into Alaska's product. As Alaska Group was licensing the Virgin brand from Virgin Group, Branson indicated a willingness to relaunch the airline after the Virgin America brand was retired.

Virgin America made its final revenue flight under its callsign "Redwood" on January 10, 2018. The next day, on January 11, 2018, the Federal Aviation Administration issued a single operating certificate for a combined Alaska Airlines and Virgin America.

Virgin America flights continued to operate using Virgin America aircraft, crew, and brand name until April 25, 2018, when the airlines merged into the same passenger service system. The final Virgin America revenue departure was Flight 1948 at 9:32 PM, traveling from the airline's San Francisco headquarters to its other hub in Los Angeles, while the true final Virgin America departure was an employee charter operating as Flight 1947 from Los Angeles to San Francisco, which departed at 9:35 PM and operated under Virgin America's original "Redwood" callsign. Overnight, the customer-facing portions of the company (including flight numbers, website, and airport check-in kiosks) were converted to use the Alaska Airlines brand.

From April 25, 2018, passengers could only see the Alaska Airlines brand online and in airports, and virginamerica.com would redirect to alaskaair.com. Prior to the brand cutover, livery repainting of Virgin America's Airbus aircraft began in January 2018. Additionally, the interiors of the Airbus aircraft underwent refitting with seats similar to those in Alaska's Boeing aircraft from September 2018, in another project expected to take several months to complete, with the first aircraft refit and unveiled in early 2019. The last plane wearing the Virgin America livery was repainted in Alaska Airlines livery in June 2019. Following the completion of the repainting of Virgin America's aircraft, virginamerica.com instead redirected to Virgin Group's website virgin.com rather than to alaskaair.com, and Virgin America's social media profiles, such as its Facebook, Twitter and YouTube were subsequently either merged with those of Alaska Airlines, had their accounts closed, or otherwise had their content largely removed.

== Corporate affairs ==
=== Business trends ===
The key trends for Virgin America over its later years were as follows (as at year ending December 31):

| | 2012 | 2013 | 2014 | 2015 |
|---|---|---|---|---|
| Net profits (US$, in millions) | −145.4 | 10.1 | 60.1 | 340.5 |
| Turnover (US$, in millions) | 1,323 | 1,425 | 1,490 | 1,530 |
| Number of employees (full & part-time, year end) | 2,509 | 2,660 | 2,672 | 2,911 |
| Number of passengers (in millions) | 6.2 | 6.3 | 6.5 | 7.0 |
| Passenger load factor (%) | 79 | 80.2 | 82.3 | 82.2 |
| Number of aircraft (at year end) | | 53 | 53 | 60 |
| References | | | | |

=== Offices ===
Virgin America leased 68,000 square feet (6,300 m^{2}) of space at Bay Park Plaza II (formerly known as the Forbes Building), a building at 555 Airport Boulevard in Burlingame, California, in the San Francisco Bay Area, owned, leased, and managed by EQ Office. Virgin America occupied suite 500 in the building, which was located across a lagoon from U.S. Highway 101 (Bayshore Freeway). Some of the space had since been repurposed as an Alaska Airlines office.

== Destinations ==
As of April 2018, Virgin America flew to a total of 31 destinations, consisting of 28 domestic destinations and three in Mexico. In addition, the airline served five destinations that were terminated prior to the merger, consisting of four domestic destinations and one in Canada. Its primary hub was located at San Francisco International Airport, with its secondary hub at Los Angeles International Airport. Virgin America also maintained a focus city at Dallas Love Field, and operated a route between Las Vegas and New York JFK.

=== Codeshare agreements ===
The airline had codeshare agreements with the following airlines at the time of its acquisition:

- Alaska Airlines (acquirer)
- Hawaiian Airlines
- Singapore Airlines
- Virgin Atlantic
- Virgin Australia

== Fleet ==
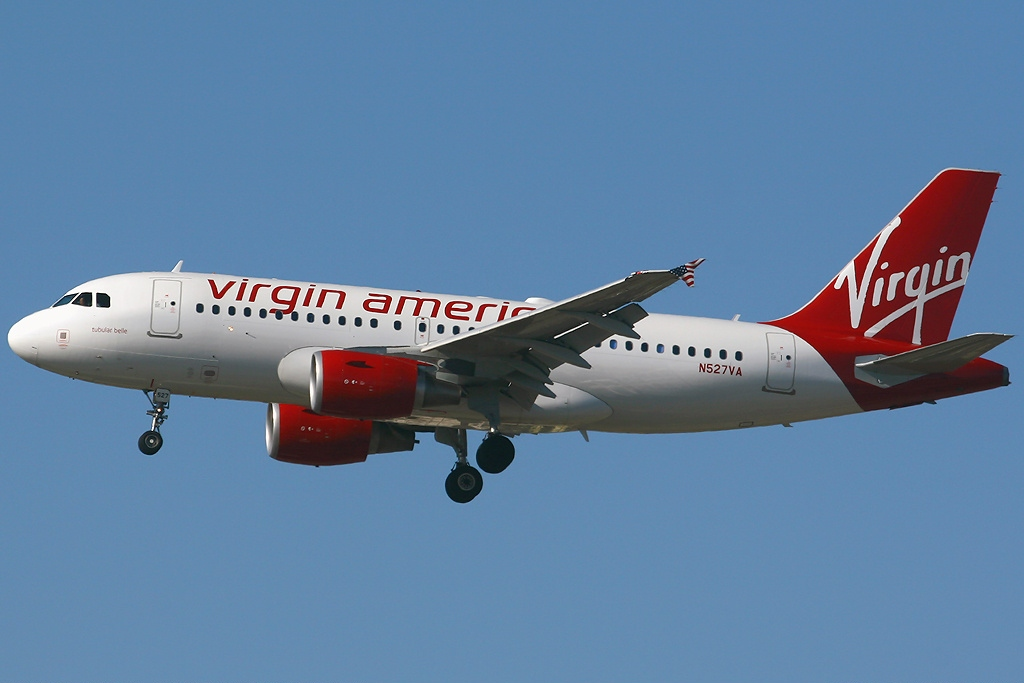
Virgin America Airbus A319-100

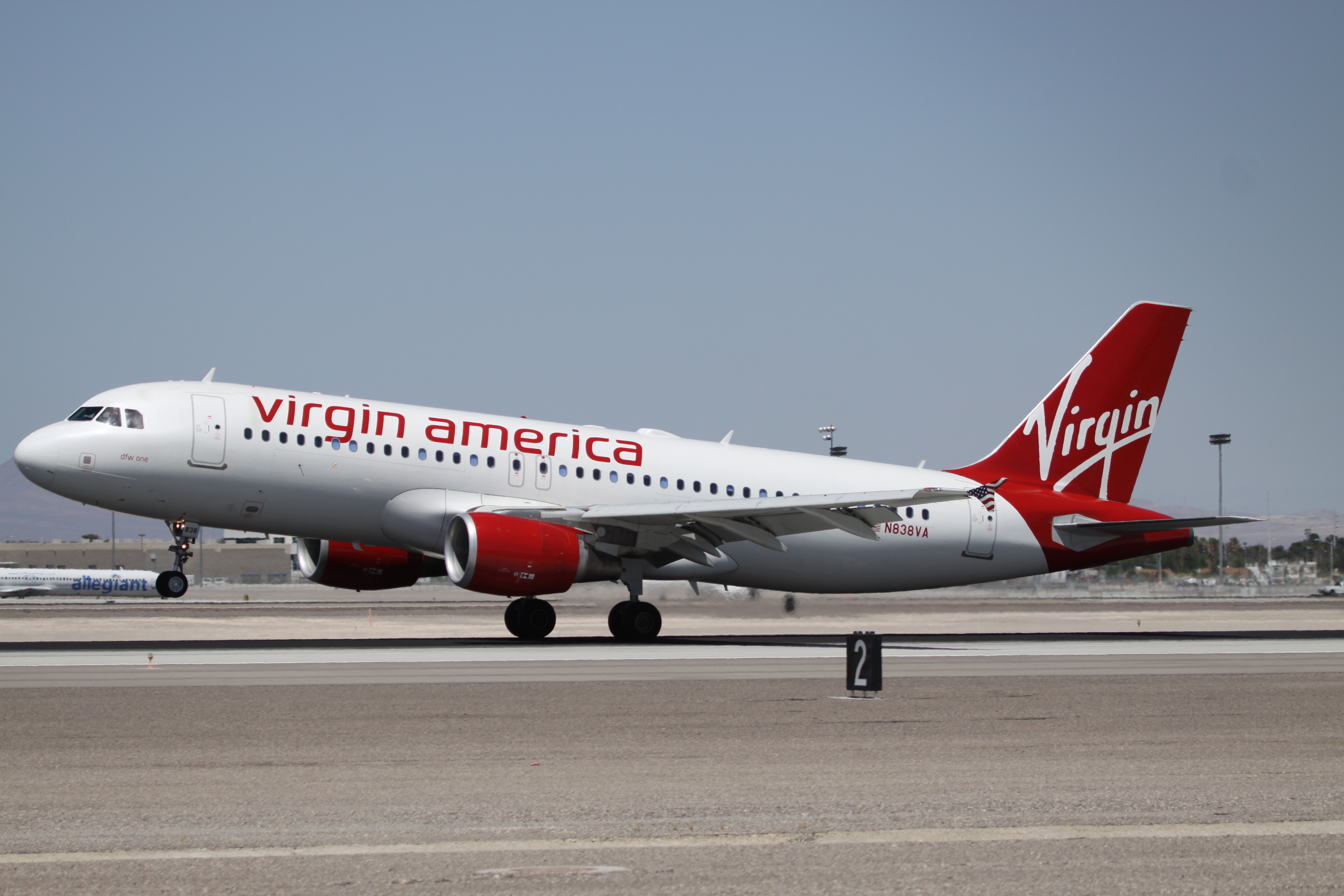
Virgin America Airbus A320-200

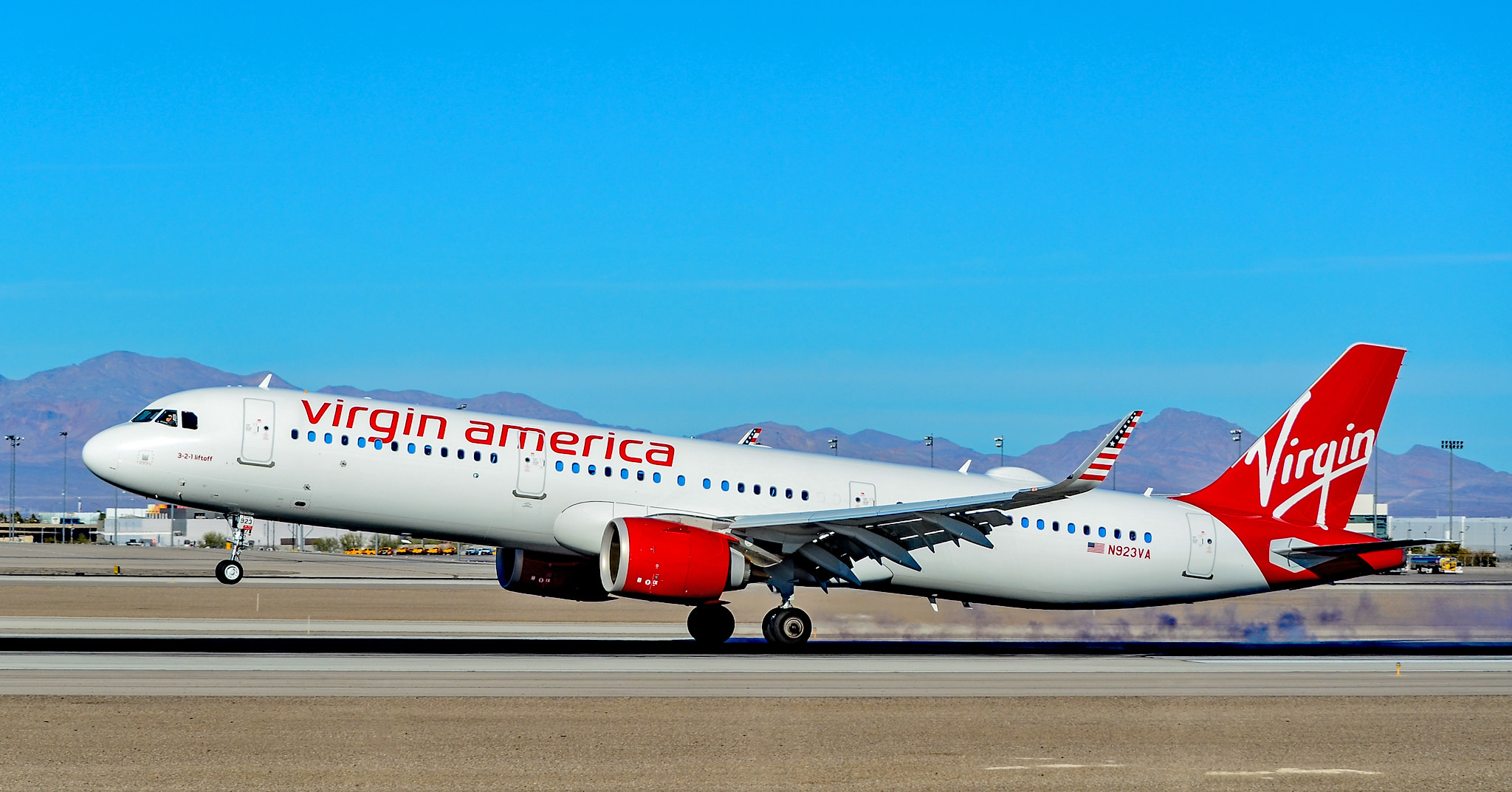
Virgin America Airbus A321NEO

As of January 11, 2018, at the time of the merger, Virgin America's all-Airbus fleet consisted of the following aircraft:

Virgin America Fleet
| Aircraft | In service | Orders | Passengers | | | | Notes |
| Aircraft | In service | Orders | F | Y+ | Y | Total | Notes |
|---|---|---|---|---|---|---|---|
| Airbus A319-100 | 10 | — | 8 | 12 | 99 | 119 | All were transferred to Alaska Airlines and later retired in 2020. |
| Airbus A320-200 | 53 | — | 8 | 12 | 129 | 149 | All were transferred to Alaska Airlines and later retired in 2023. |
| Airbus A320-200 | 53 | — | 8 | 12 | 126 | 146 | All were transferred to Alaska Airlines and later retired in 2023. |
| Airbus A320neo | — | 30 | N/A | | | | Orders were transferred to Alaska Airlines, but were later canceled when Alaska ordered additional Boeing 737 MAXs. |
| Airbus A321neo | 4 | 6 | 8 | 18 | 159 | 185 | Launch customer. All fleet and remaining deliveries transferred to Alaska Airlines and later sold to American Airlines in 2023. |
| Total | 67 | 36 | | | | | |

== Cabin ==
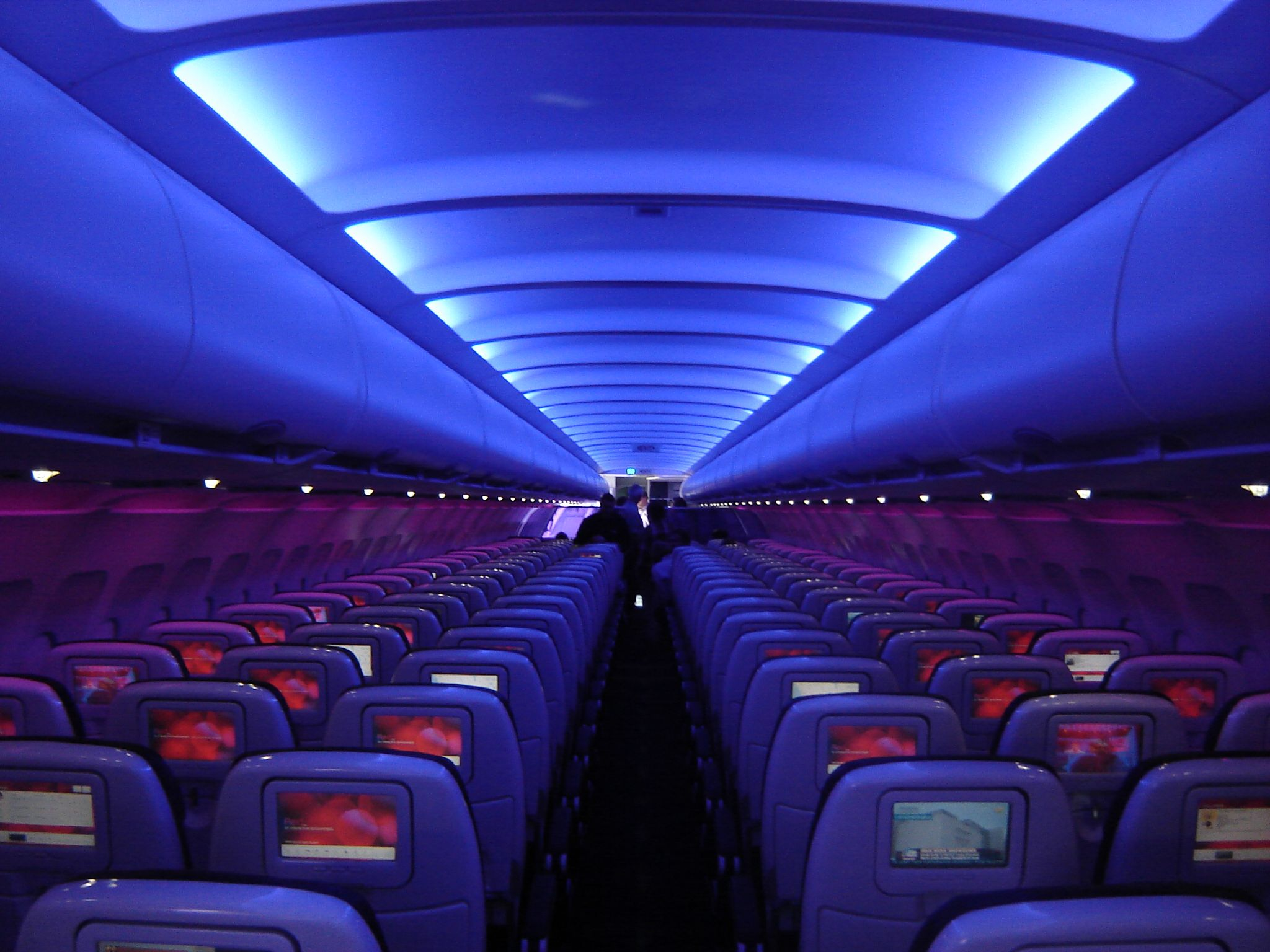
Virgin America Main Cabin

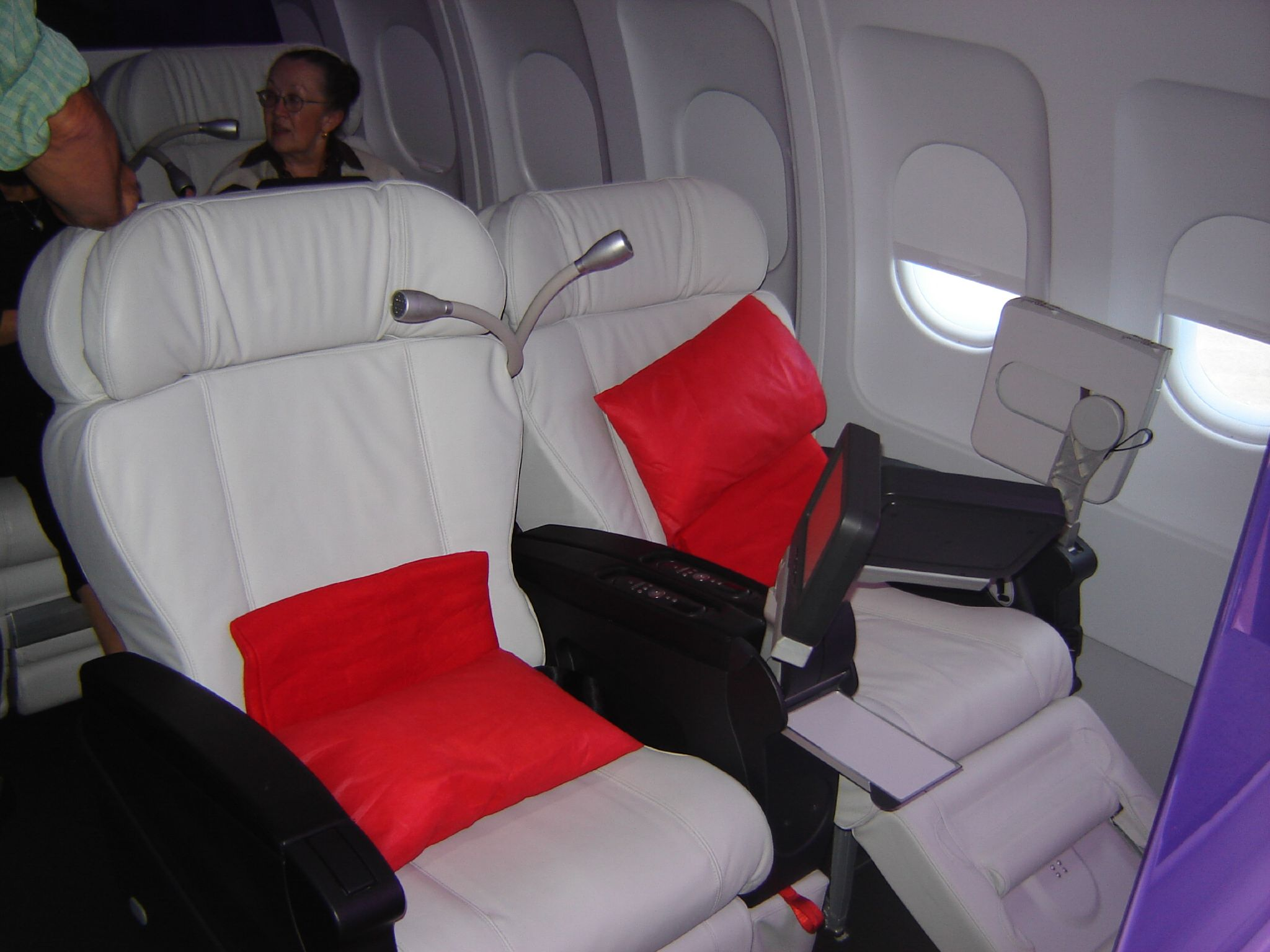
Virgin America First Class

=== In-flight entertainment ===
Virgin America offered dual-class service on all flights it operated. Both cabins featured mood lighting and all seats were equipped with a Panasonic Avionics in-flight entertainment system running a customized touch-screen GUI called Red. In July 2010, the Red software had been upgraded to version 2.0 across the entire fleet. This update included new features such as an updated position mapping system powered by Google Maps, in-flight shopping, and open tab capabilities. The Red system was upgraded again in June 2015, introducing the new Android seatback touch screen service, and a new position mapping system by Flightpath 3D.

=== Seating ===
First Class seats offered 55 inches (140 cm) of pitch and were 21 inches (53 cm) wide. The seats featured power-ports, adjustable headrests, a massage function, tablet friendly tray table (with two positions), and various recline controls. Passengers seated in first class received complimentary meals, refreshments and alcoholic beverages, small amenity kit, long-haul guests received a large duvet & pillow and received dedicated airport check-in, security screening, and aircraft boarding. In first class, Red offered free live satellite television, free on-demand movies, free on-demand television programming and a selection of games. Guests could also utilize GoGo for limited, but free messaging on certain platforms. The front lavatory was for first class guests only.

Main Cabin Select was Virgin America's premium economy product. It was not a distinct class; instead, on the A319-100 and A320-200, the service was located at Main Cabin seats in the exit row and behind the bulkheads. On their A321neo, the service was located in the first three rows of the Main Cabin. Passengers were offered more conveniences than in normal Main Cabin seats and had 38 inches (97 cm) of seat pitch, 17.7 inches (45 cm) of width and dedicated luggage bins. Like in first class, meals, refreshments and alcoholic beverages were free, as were the premium television channels and movies. Airport check-in, security screening, and aircraft boarding were prioritized over Main Cabin passengers. Guests could also utilize GoGo for limited, but free messaging on certain platforms. The lavatories in the back were for all passengers flying in economy, including Main Cabin Select.

Main Cabin seats offered 32 inches (81 cm) of pitch and were 17.7 inches (45 cm) wide with power-ports and adjustable headrests. Following the merger with Alaska Airlines, Red mirrored Alaska's in-flight service by offering live satellite television, on-demand movies, on-demand television shows, and a selection of games for free. In aligning further with Alaska Airlines, all movies and content were free for all guests, regardless of cabin. Furthermore, in addition to the free beverage service, passengers could order more complimentary non-alcoholic beverages, or purchase snacks, meals, special-branded amenity kit, pillow/blanket, and alcoholic beverages from their seats via Red. Guests could also utilize GoGo for limited, but free messaging on certain platforms.

Alaska Air Group had stated that as part of the reconfiguration, the Virgin America First Class seats would be removed and replaced with a different model to streamline the product with the Alaska Airlines product. The seats, while considered a downgrade from the current seats, would have only 41" of seat pitch, slightly more recline than the current Alaska Airlines 737 First Class product, retaining the Virgin America foot rests, and different placement of the powerports. The number of First Class seats would increase from 8 to 16 seats on the A321neo, and from eight to twelve seats on both the A319 and A320.

Alaska also reconfigured the Virgin America Airbus fleet to include at least three rows of Main Cabin Select, which was a significant change as the current configuration included the emergency exit row (or second row in Airbus A320 fleet) as part of Main Cabin Select; these seats would now just be considered preferred seats/extra legroom after integration.

In April 2020, in response to COVID-19 pandemic impacts, Alaska indefinitely stored all aircraft that retained Virgin America interiors, and none had flown for Alaska again.

== Frequent-flyer program ==
Virgin America's frequent-flyer program was Elevate, which allowed passengers to earn five points for every dollar spent on a flight's base fare, which excluded taxes and other fees. The program was discontinued on January 1, 2018. Elevate members were given the option to manually convert Elevate points into Alaska Airlines' Mileage Plan miles until January 31, 2018, with any remaining Elevate points automatically converted by February 8, 2018.

Following the discontinuation of Elevate in January 2018, flights operated by Virgin America continued to earn credit on Alaska Airlines' Mileage Plan and the frequent flyer programs of partner airlines (including Hawaiian Airlines‘ HawaiianMiles, Emirates Skywards, Singapore Airlines’ KrisFlyer, or Virgin Australia's Velocity Frequent Flyer) until Virgin America was integrated into Alaska Airlines on April 25, 2018.

== See also ==
- Shuttle by United, a subsidiary of United Airlines that operated from 1994 to 2001 along the West Coast of the United States
- Hughes Airwest
- Pacific Southwest Airlines
- Air California
- List of defunct airlines of the United States
