= Hockaday =

Hockaday is a surname. Notable people with the surname include:

- Arthur Hockaday (1926–2004), English civil servant
- Dave Hockaday (born 1957), English footballer and manager
- Jim Hockaday (born 1964), American football player
- Mary Hockaday (born 1962), British journalist

== See also ==
- Hockaday Museum, in Kalispell, Montana
