= Stewart Information Services Corporation =

American real estate title insurance company

- Type: Public
- Traded as: NYSE: STC; S&P 600 component
- Industry: Financial services
- Founded: 1893
- Headquarters: Houston, Texas, United States
- Number of locations: 508
- Area served: United States and other countries
- Key people: Thomas G. Apel (chairman); Frederick Eppinger (CEO)
- Products: Title insurance
- Number of employees: 6,350 (2016)
- Website: stewart.com

Stewart Information Services Corporation (SISCO) is a real estate information, title insurance and transaction management company. Wholly owned subsidiaries, Stewart Title Guaranty Co. and Stewart Title Company offer products and services in the United States and abroad through its direct retail operations, independent agencies in the Stewart Trusted Provider network, and other companies. Stewart Title is headquartered in Houston, Texas, and has approximately 6,350 employees.

Founded by Maco Stewart in 1893 in Galveston, Texas, the company has grown to offer title insurance policies and escrow services in more than 80 countries. In 2014 Stewart Title was recognized by Forbes as one of the 50 Most Trustworthy Financial Companies in America. In 2012, SISCO was nationally recognized in Forbes’ Top 100 Most Trustworthy Companies in the U.S. It was number four on the 2007 FORTUNE magazine’s "America’s Most Admired Companies" in "Mortgage Services". It was also number 703 on the Fortune 1000 list in 2006.
