= Invited Clubs =

American corporation based in Washington, US

- Founded: 1957; 69 years ago in Dallas, Texas
- Founder: Robert H. Dedman, Sr.
- Headquarters: Dallas, Texas
- Number of locations: 192 (2022)
- Area served: United States, Mexico
- Key people: David Pillsbury (CEO)
- Owner: Apollo Management Holdings
- Members: 430,000+ (2018)
- Number of employees: 20,000+ (2018)
- Website: invitedclubs.com

Invited Clubs (formerly ClubCorp Holdings, Inc) is an American corporation based in Dallas. It owns and operates more than 200 golf country clubs, businesses, sports and alumni clubs worldwide. Located in 26 states, the District of Columbia, and 2 countries outside of the United States (Mexico and China), the company and its clubs have more than 430,000 members and employ around 20,000 people.

== History ==
The company was founded by the late Robert H. Dedman, Sr. (1926-2002) as Country Club, Inc., later renamed ClubCorp. His son, Robert H. Dedman, Jr., became president in 1989 and CEO in 1998. His daughter, Patty Dedman Dietz, was previously on its board of directors. In 2002, its CEO was John A. Beckert. Private equity firm KSL Capital Partners bought the company in 2006. ClubCorp Holdings, Inc. went public in 2013 and was traded on the New York Stock Exchange under the symbol MYCC until 2017 when the company was acquired by Apollo Global Management.

Eric L. Affeldt is a former CEO of the company. Golf magazine named him the most powerful person in golf in 2010 and 2014.

In 1981, ClubCorp acquired Firestone Country Club in Akron, OH, and in 1984, bought golf courses, hotels, etc, in Pinehurst, North Carolina. ClubCorp also bought the Mission Hills Country Club, Indian Wells Country Club, Gleneagles Country Club, Stonebriar Country Club, and the Las Colinas Country Club. Others include The Homestead in 1993, Barton Creek, Austin, Texas and Daufuskie Island. In 1998, ClubCorp entered into an agreement for Golden Bear International, Jack Nicklaus's company, to design 36 new golf courses, co-owned and operated by ClubCorp.

ClubCorp hired David Pillsbury as the new CEO in June 2018

== Private Clubs magazine ==
In 1986, ClubCorp began publishing its own travel and lifestyle magazine, Private Clubs. The magazine was an award winner in one of the contests in the magazine industry, the FOLIO: Awards. By 2020, Private Clubs had transitioned into a digital-only publication and changed its name to ClubLife.
