= Yukio Horigome =

Yukio Horigome (堀籠 幸男, Horigome Yukio, born June 16, 1940) was a member of the Supreme Court of Japan. He died from pneumonia on March 6, 2025.
