= List of Ohio State University Moritz College of Law alumni =

The following is a list of notable alumni of the Ohio State University Moritz College of Law in Columbus, Ohio:

== Academia ==
- Linda L. Ammons (1987), dean of Widener University School of Law
- John W. Garland (1974), president of Central State University
- RonNell Andersen Jones (2000), professor of Law at the University of Utah S.J. Quinney College of Law
- Joan Krauskopf (1957), professor emeritus of Law at the Moritz College of Law
- Arthur T. Martin (1929), dean of the Ohio State University Moritz College of Law
- LeRoy Pernell (1974), dean of Florida A&M University College of Law and Northern Illinois University College of Law
- Don W. Sears (1948), dean and professor emeritus of Law at the University of Colorado Law School; Purple Heart and Bronze Star recipient
- Paul L. Selby (1947), dean and professor emeritus of Law at the West Virginia University College of Law; member of 1942 National Championship Ohio State Buckeyes football team
- L. Orin Slagle (1957), dean of the Florida State University College of Law and Moritz College of Law
- Gregory J. Vincent (1987), president of Hobart and William Smith Colleges

== Business ==
- John W. Creighton Jr. (1957), president and CEO of Weyerhaeuser Company
- Bruce Downey (1973), chairman and CEO of Barr Pharmaceuticals (now Teva Pharmaceuticals)
- John Lowe (1998), CEO of Jeni's Splendid Ice Creams
- Nick Mileti (1956), founder and owner of the Cleveland Cavaliers and owner of the Cleveland Indians
- Thomas F. Patton (1926), president, chairman and CEO of Republic Steel (now Mittal Steel Company)
- Donald Clinton Power (1926), chairman and CEO of GTE Corporation (now Verizon Communications)

== Government ==
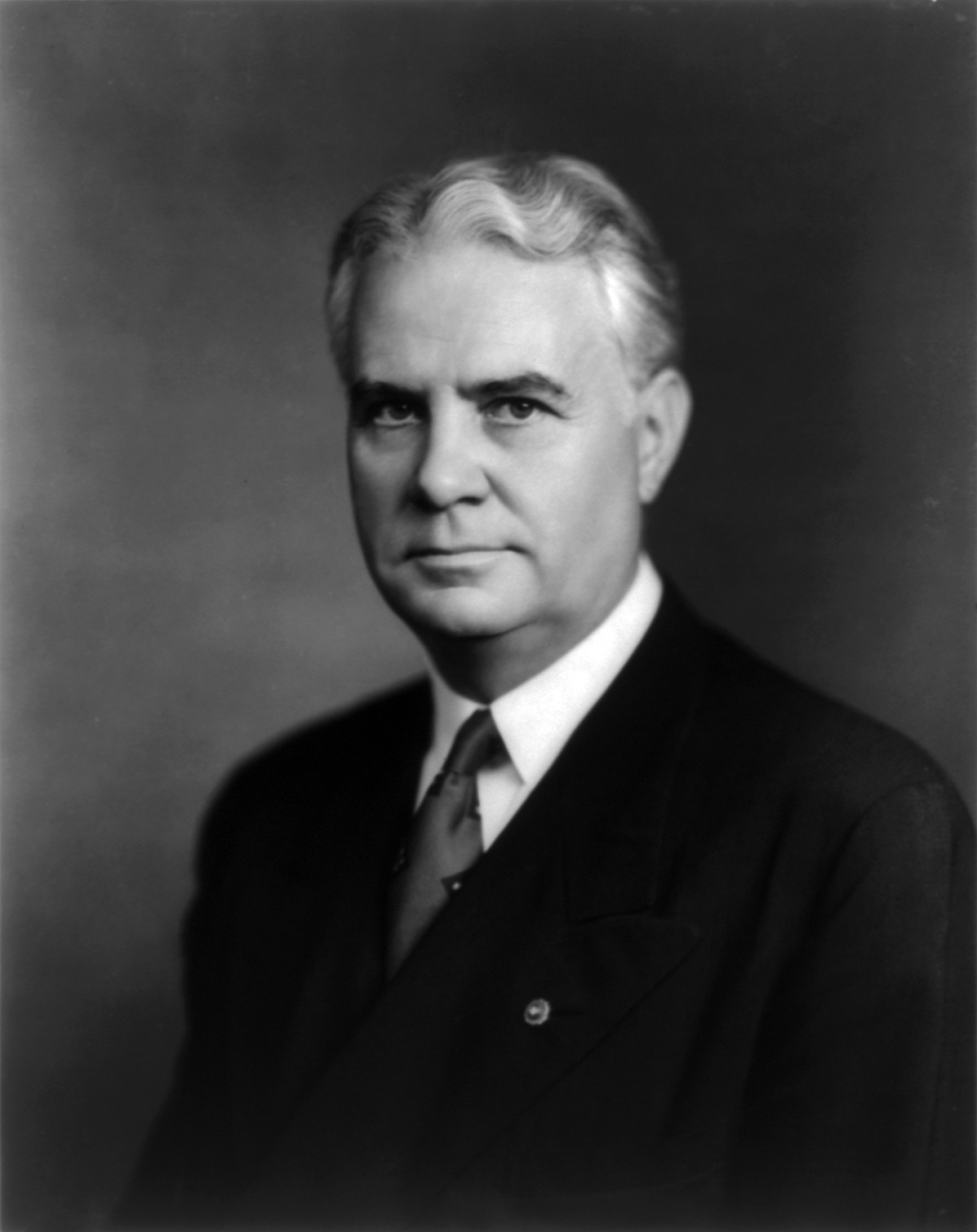
John Bricker

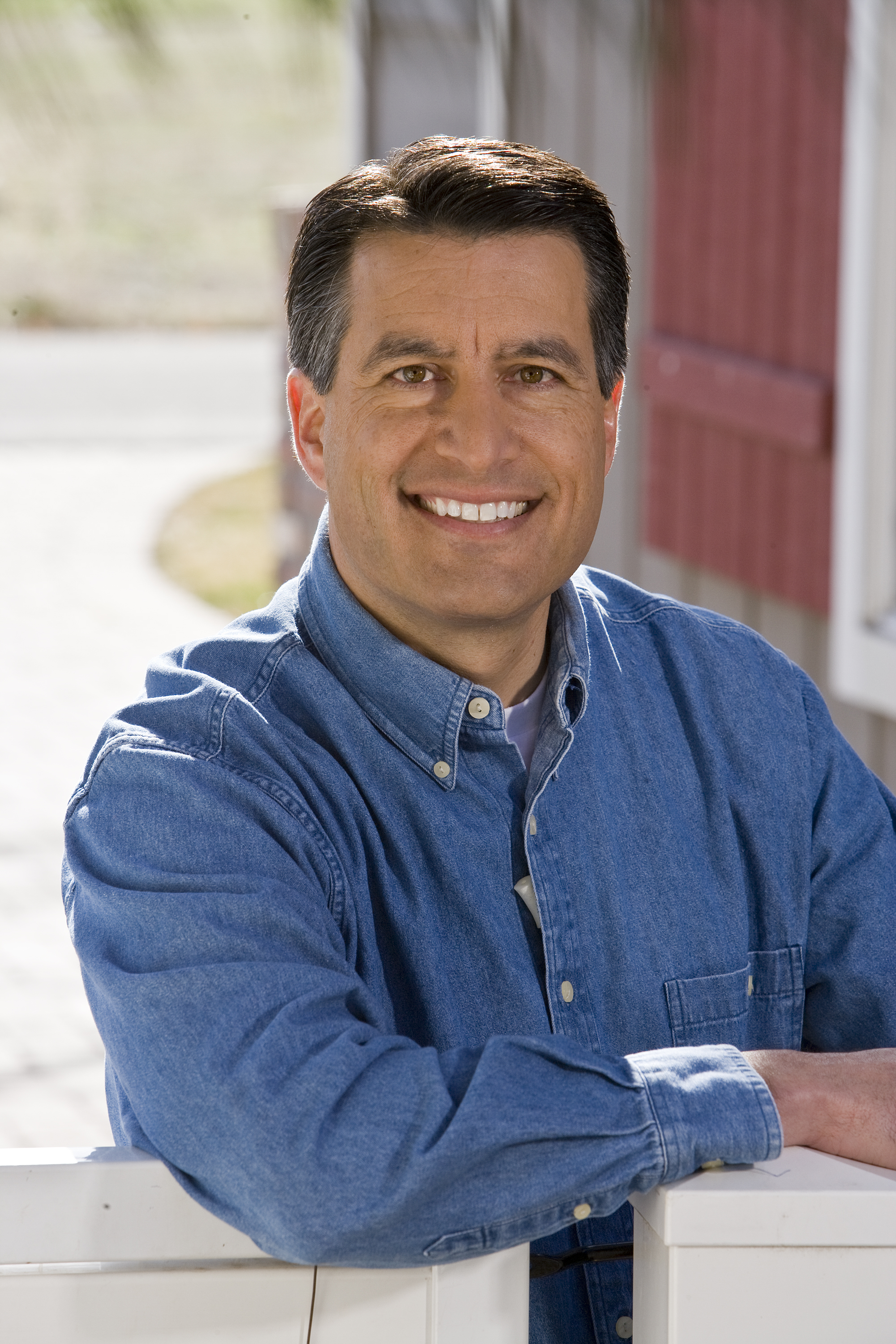
Brian Sandoval

=== Federal ===
- Thomas J. Fiscus (1975), United States Air Force Judge Advocate General
- Linda Fisher (1982), deputy administrator of the United States Environmental Protection Agency
- William Isaac (1969), chairman of the Federal Deposit Insurance Corporation
- William Saxbe (1948), 70th United States attorney general; United States senator from Ohio
- Carmi Thompson (1895), 23rd treasurer of the United States

=== State and local ===
- John W. Bricker (1920), 54th governor of Ohio; United States senator from Ohio
- Aaron D. Ford (2001), 34th attorney general of Nevada
- Paul M. Herbert (1917), 47th, 49th, and 52nd lieutenant governor of Ohio; associate justice of the Ohio Supreme Court
- George Sidney Marshall, 38th mayor of Columbus, Ohio
- James H. McGee (1948), first African-American mayor of Dayton, Ohio
- C. William O'Neill (1942), 59th governor of Ohio; former chief justice of the Ohio Supreme Court
- Buck Rinehart (1973), 50th mayor of Columbus, Ohio
- Mike Sanders (1994), Jackson County, Missouri executive
- Brian Sandoval (1989), 29th governor of Nevada; former United States district judge for the District of Nevada
- Russell Suzuki, 15th attorney general of Hawaii
- Edward C. Turner (1901), 26th and 30th Ohio attorney general; justice of the Ohio Supreme Court
- George Voinovich (1961), 65th governor of Ohio; United States senator from Ohio

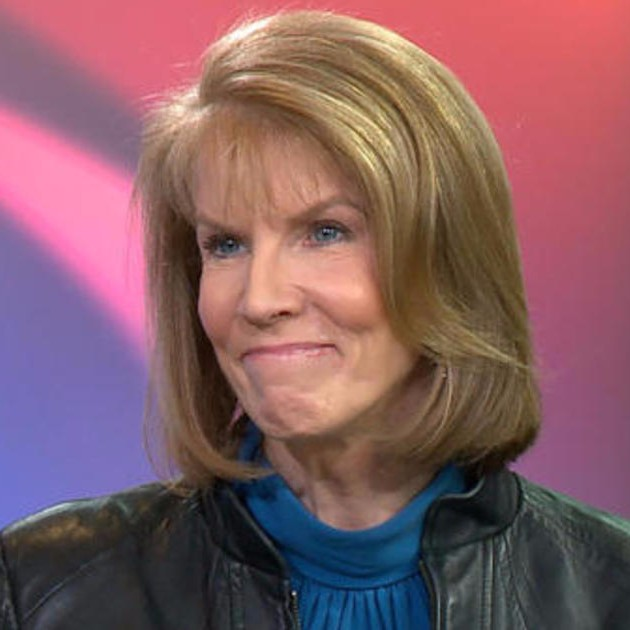
Erin Moriarty

== Journalists ==
- Bob Fitrakis (1982), editor-in-chief of the Columbus Free Press
- Chris Geidner (2005), journalist and legal editor for BuzzFeed
- Madison Gesiotto (2017), columnist for the Washington Times; Miss Ohio USA 2014
- Erin Moriarty (1977), Emmy Award-winning journalist for CBS News and 48 Hours

== Judges ==
=== Federal ===
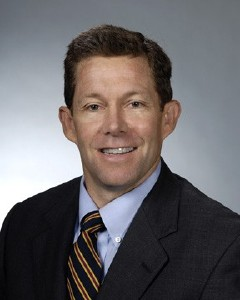
Jeffrey Sutton

- Jessica G. L. Clarke (2008), United States district judge for the Southern District of New York
- Ann Donnelly (1984), United States district judge for the Eastern District of New York
- William Miller Drennen (1938), chief judge of the United States Tax Court
- Robert Duncan (1952), first African-American United States district judge for Ohio and Ohio Supreme Court justice
- Wallace Samuel Gourley (1929), United States district judge for the Western District of Pennsylvania
- Donald L. Graham (1974), United States district judge for the Southern District of Florida
- James L. Graham (1962), United States district judge for the Southern District of Ohio
- George Philip Hahn (1905), United States district judge for the Northern District of Ohio
- Kenneth Harkins (1943), United States Court of Federal Claims judge
- Charles Sherrod Hatfield (1907), United States Court of Customs and Patent Appeals judge
- Jeffrey J. Helmick (1988), United States district judge for the Northern District of Ohio
- Benson W. Hough (1899), United States district judge for the Southern District of Ohio
- David A. Katz (1957), United States district judge for the Northern District of Ohio
- Sara Elizabeth Lioi (1987), United States district judge for the Northern District of Ohio
- David A. Ruiz (2000), United States district judge for the Northern District of Ohio
- George Curtis Smith (1959), United States district judge for the Northern District of Ohio
- Jeffrey Sutton (1990), United States Court of Appeals judge for the Sixth Circuit
- William Kernahan Thomas (1935), United States district judge for the Northern District of Ohio
- Herman Jacob Weber (1952), United States district judge for the Southern District of Ohio

=== State and local ===
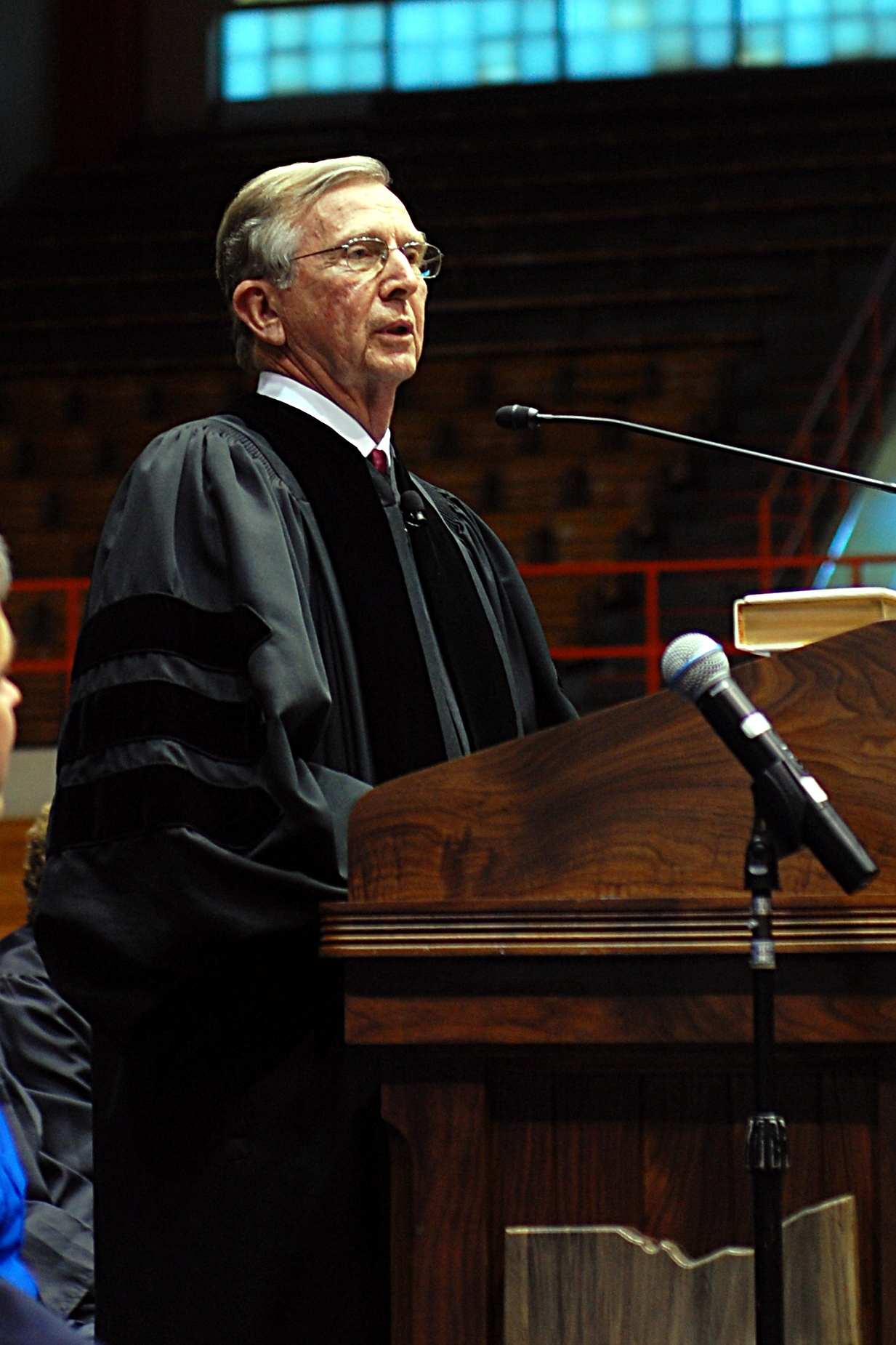
Thomas Moyer

- James F. Bell (1939), associate justice of the Ohio Supreme Court
- Brent D. Benjamin (1984), justice of the Supreme Court of Appeals of West Virginia
- Lloyd O. Brown (1955), associate justice of the Ohio Supreme Court
- Paul W. Brown (1939), associate justice of the Ohio Supreme Court
- Howard E. Faught (1935), associate justice of the Ohio Supreme Court
- Judith L. French (1988), associate justice of the Ohio Supreme Court
- W. F. Garver (1893), associate justice of the Ohio Supreme Court
- Thomas M. Herbert (1955), associate justice of the Ohio Supreme Court
- Wade L. Hopping (1955), Florida Supreme Court justice
- Robert E. Leach (1935), chief justice of the Ohio Supreme Court
- John M. Matthias (1928), associate justice of the Ohio Supreme Court
- Yvette McGee Brown (1985), first African-American female justice of the Ohio Supreme Court
- Henry A. Middleton (1911), associate justice of the Ohio Supreme Court
- Thomas J. Moyer (1964), chief justice of the Ohio Supreme Court
- Paul Pfeifer (1966), associate justice of the Ohio Supreme Court
- James E. Robinson (1893), associate justice of the Ohio Supreme Court
- Evelyn Lundberg Stratton (1979), justice of the Ohio Supreme Court
- Beth Walker (1990), justice of the West Virginia Supreme Court of Appeals
- Elizabeth M. Welch (1995), justice of the Michigan Supreme Court

== Legislators ==
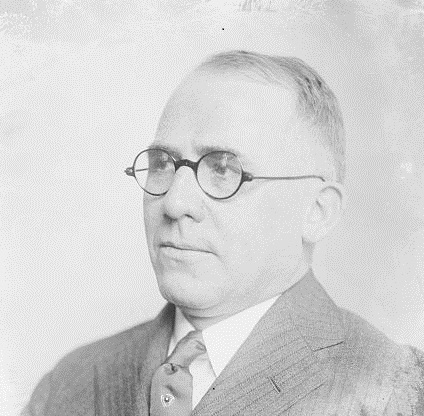
Israel Foster

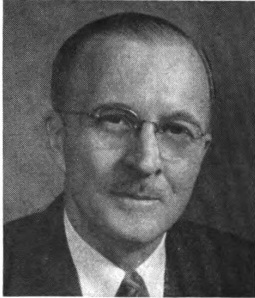
William McCulloch

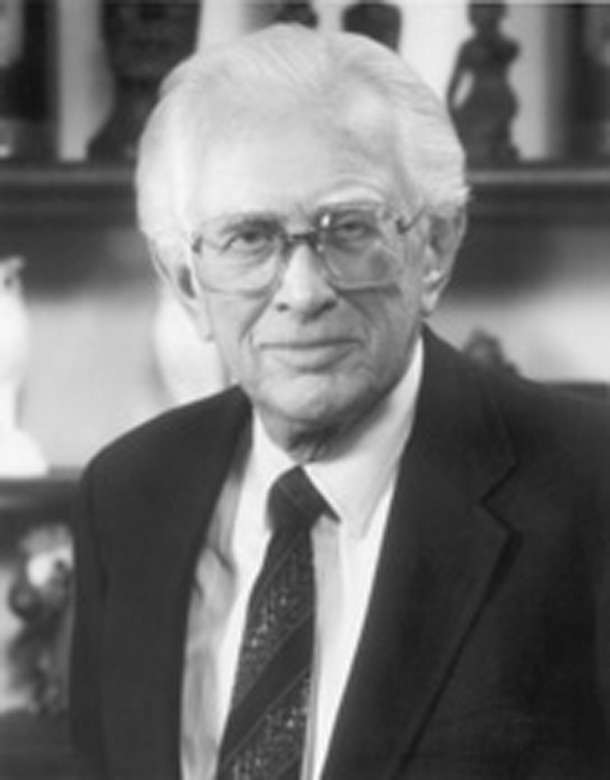
Howard Metzenbaum

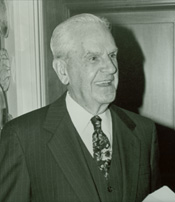
William Natcher

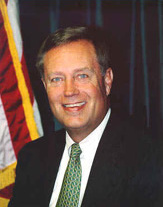
Michael Oxley

=== Federal ===
- Pete Abele (1953), United States congressman from Ohio
- Walter H. Albaugh (1914), United States congressman from Ohio
- John M. Ashbrook (1955), United States congressman from Ohio
- Thomas W. L. Ashley (1951), United States congressman from Ohio
- Charles G. Bond (1899), United States congressman from New York
- Daniel S. Earhart (1928), United States congressman from Ohio
- Israel Moore Foster (1898), United States congressman from Ohio; proposed Child Labor Amendment to U.S. Constitution
- David L. Hobson (1963), United States congressman from Ohio
- Robert E. Holmes (1949), United States congressman from Ohio
- Lawrence E. Imhoff (1930), United States congressman from Ohio
- Harry P. Jeffrey (1926), United States congressman from Ohio; author of G.I. Bill
- Thomas A. Jenkins (1907), United States congressman from Ohio
- Mary Jo Kilroy (1980), United States congresswoman from Ohio
- Frank Le Blond Kloeb (1907), United States congressman from Ohio
- William Moore McCulloch (1925), United States congressman from Ohio; key backer of Civil Rights Act of 1964
- Howard Metzenbaum (1941), United States senator from Ohio; introduced WARN Act
- C. Ellis Moore (1910), United States congressman from Ohio
- Grant E. Mouser Jr. (1917), United States congressman from Ohio
- William Huston Natcher (1933), longest-serving United States congressman from Kentucky; Presidential Citizens Medal recipient
- Michael G. Oxley (1969), United States congressman from Ohio; introduced Sarbanes–Oxley Act
- Zack Space (1986), United States congressman from Ohio
- Robert M. Switzer (1892), United States congressman from Ohio
- Mell G. Underwood (1915), United States congressman from Ohio; United States district judge for the Southern District of Ohio
- John Martin Vorys (1923), United States congressman from Ohio

=== State and local ===
- William G. Batchelder (1967), 101st speaker of the Ohio House of Representatives
- Rupert R. Beetham, speaker of the Ohio House of Representatives
- John W. Bowen (1953), Ohio state senator
- Harold Brazil, council member of the District of Columbia
- John Patrick Carney (2001), Ohio state representative
- Kathleen Clyde (2008), Ohio state representative
- Keith Faber (1991), 98th president of the Ohio Senate
- Patrick O. Jefferson, Louisiana state representative
- Charles Kurfess (1957), 94th speaker of the Ohio House of Representatives
- James A. Lantz (1947), Ohio state representative
- Jason Petrie (1998), Kentucky state representative
- Amy Salerno (1982), Ohio state representative
- Charles R. Saxbe (1975), Ohio state representative
- Robert Shaw (1929), Ohio state senator
- Peter Stautberg, Ohio state representative; judge of the Ohio First District Court of Appeals
- Michael Stinziano (2007), Ohio state representative
- Mark Wagoner (1997), Ohio state senator

== Other ==
- Blake Haxton (2016), U.S. Paralympic athlete and two-time Paralympic medal winner
- Brendan Healy (2009), three time All-American and professional lacrosse player
- Brandon Mitchell (2013), former National Football League player
- Rich Nathan (1980), pastor and author
- Bobby Samini (1995), nationally renowned celebrity attorney
- Michael Shane (1953), lawyer and actor
- Stuart A. Summit (1959), executive secretary of the New York City mayor's Committee on the Judiciary
