= John Lowe =

John Lowe may refer to:

== Sports ==
- John Lowe (footballer, born 1866) (1866-1911), English footballer, see List of Bury F.C. players (25–99 appearances)
- John Lowe (cricketer) (1888–1970), English cricketer
- John Lowe (rugby league), English rugby league footballer
- John Lowe (footballer) (1912–1995), Scottish football player
- John Lowe (darts player) (born 1945), English darts player.
- John Lowe (sportswriter) (fl. 1980s–2020s), American sportswriter

== Politicians ==
- John Lowe (MP) (1628–1667), English politician who sat in the House of Commons from 1661 to 1667
- John Lowe (Nebraska politician) (born 1959), member of the Nebraska Legislature

== Entertainment ==
- John Muir Lowe (1898–1988), better known as John Loder
- John Lowe (musician) (1942–2024), English musician
- John Owen Lowe (born 1995), American actor

== Religion ==
- John Lowe (martyr) (1553–1586), English Catholic priest and martyr
- John Lowe (Dean of Christ Church) (1899–1960), Canadian-born Vice-Chancellor of Oxford University

== Others ==
- John Lowe (American Horror Story), an American Horror Story: Hotel character
- John S. Lowe (fl. 1960s–2020s), American law professor
- John Lowe (executive) (fl. 1990s–2020s), American business executive
- John Duncan Lowe (1948–1998), lawyer in Scotland
- John Lowe (indologist) (fl. 2010s–2020s), British indologist

== See also ==
- John Low (disambiguation)
- Jack Lowe (disambiguation)
- John Law (disambiguation)
