= John Law =

John Law may refer to:

== Arts and entertainment ==
- John Law (artist) (born 1958), American artist
- John Law (comics), comic-book character created by Will Eisner
- John Law (DC Comics), a fictional character from DC Comics
- John Law (film director), Hong Kong film director
- John Law (musician) (born 1961), British jazz pianist and composer
- John Law (novel), an 1864 novel by William Henry Ainsworth
- John Law (writer) (1929–1970), British TV comedy writer
- John Law, pseudonym of Margaret Harkness (1854–1923), English journalist and writer
- John Phillip Law (1937–2008), American film actor
- "John Law", a song by Dropkick Murphys first released on The Singles Collection, Volume 1

== Politics ==
- John Law (Indiana politician) (1796–1873), U.S. Representative from Indiana
- John Law (New Zealand politician), mayor of Rodney District in New Zealand
- John Martin Law Jr. (1903–1981), mayor of Eau Gallie, Florida, from 1943 to 1950

== Religion ==
- John Law (bishop) (1745–1810), English mathematician and Church of Ireland bishop
- John Law (priest) (1739–1827), Anglican priest
- John Law (minister) (died 1712), Scottish minister

== Science and academia ==
- John Law (economist) (1671–1729), Scottish economist
- John Law (sociologist) (born 1946), sociologist at the Open University

== Sports ==
- John B. Law, head college football coach for the Manhattan College Jaspers, New York, 1930–1931
- John Law (Australian footballer) (born 1959), Australian rules footballer
- John Law (American football) (1905–1962), American football player
- John Law (footballer, born 1887) (fl. 1887–1914), Scottish footballer
- John Law (cricketer), English cricketer

== See also ==
- John Laws (1935–2025), Australian radio broadcaster
- John Laws (judge) (1945–2020), English judge
- John Lowe (disambiguation)
