= Jack Lowe =

Jack Lowe may refer to:

- Jack Lowe Sr. (1913–1980), American businessman
- Jack Lowe Jr. (born 1939), American businessman
- Jack Lowe (English footballer) (1900–?), English footballer
- Jack Lowe (Australian footballer) (1890–1944), Australian rules footballer

== See also ==
- John Lowe (disambiguation)
