= Jack Lowe Jr. =

American business executive

- Jack Lowe Jr. in 1987
- Born: May 20, 1939 (age 87); Bloomfield, New Jersey
- Education: Rice University
- Occupation: Business executive
- Parent(s): Jack Lowe Sr. and Harriet Lowe

Jack Lowe Jr. was an American business executive who became the CEO of his family business TDIndustries where he furthered his fathers legacy.

He was born May 20, 1939, in Bloomfield, New Jersey, the son of Jack Lowe Sr. and his wife Harriet. Lowe Jr. grew up in Dallas and attended Highland Park High School. He graduated magna cum laude from Rice University in Electrical Engineering and served two years in the U.S. Navy before joining TDIndustries in 1964.

TDIndustries was recognized by Fortune Magazine as one of the Best Places to Work repeatedly because of the company's use of the servant-leadership model. Lowe Jr. furthered his father's legacy at TDIndustries and in the broader business community as a whole.

== TDIndustries ==
By 1965, Lowe was low man in the Wholesale Division, and someone had pointed him in the direction of the fledgling apartment industry. He was selling cable heating for residences and a new unitary heating and cooling system for the new large apartment complexes. By the time TD brought GE’s new and better equipment into the Dallas market, unitary systems were considered a bad risk. The Lincoln Properties’ Willow Creek complex went with TD’s system, opening the apartment market to GE units.

Lincoln Properties ran a subsidiary called RCLP—Rockefeller, Crow, Lyle and Pogue—that did all of its mechanical work. Trammell wanted TD to take over all of the air conditioning, plumbing, and electrical in their apartment business. TD agreed to the air conditioning and later plumbing. The plumbers, heat and air crews formed a separate company in 1967 that would function as a franchised Texas Distributors dealer and was named Tempo Air Conditioning, Inc. Trouble arose almost immediately, and it reflected on Lowe, who was the Wholesale Division’s liaison with Tempo—the man in charge of Tempo had been diverting men and materials to his own projects, and Lowe didn’t catch him at it. It was a big trauma to him and a growing experience.

By 1971, Lowe was General Manager of Texas Distributors, and in 1976, he became General Manager for TDMechanical. In 1978, Tempo was taken in as a full-fledged division of Texas Distributors. It grew and soon joined TDMechanical as TDIndustries’ largest earners. Lowe was promoted to President and Chief Operating Officer in 1979, and after the passing of his father in 1980, he became CEO. Lowe Jr. served as CEO from 1980 to 2005, and continues to serve as chairman of the board for TDIndustries. He was succeeded by Harold MacDowell.

== Community involvement ==
In his career, Lowe has been active in many civic and industry organizations, including serving on the boards of the Dallas Citizens Council, Salesmanship Club of Dallas, United Way of Metropolitan Dallas, Better Business Bureau of Metropolitan Dallas, Dallas Zoological Society, the advisory council of the Communities Foundation of Texas, Quality Texas Foundation, Texas Business and Education Coalition, and the Senior Citizens of Greater Dallas. He is also currently Chairman of the Board of the Dallas chapter of QUOIN, Associated General Contractors. His past community service includes serving on the boards of the Dallas Chapter of the American Red Cross, Center for Non Profit Management, Cotton Bowl Athletic Association, Dallas County Community College District Foundation, Greater Dallas Chamber of Commerce, and Construction Education Foundation. He is the past president of the Salesmanship Club of Dallas, Dallas Alliance, and the Community Council of Greater Dallas.

In 2002, Lowe began serving on the Board of Trustees of the Dallas Independent School District, and in May 2006, became president of the board. He has been a director of the Zales corporation since 2004, a director of Drew Industries since 2005, and has been the Business Co-chair of the Texas Business and Education Coalition and on the board of the Center for the Reform of School Systems since 2000. He continues to chair the board of the Greenleaf Center for Servant Leadership.

== Achievements ==
Among his many awards and honors are the Crystal Achievement Award from the National Association of Women in Construction, the Ethics Award from the Preston Center Rotary Club, the SIR (Service, Integrity, Responsibility) Award from the Associated General Contractors, Dallas Chapter, and the Alumni Award from Leadership Dallas. He also received the national 2000 Ernst & Young Entrepreneur of the Year Award for Principle-centered Leadership, presented by Stephen Covey of the Franklin Covey Co. in Palm Springs, California . The award recognized Lowe’s lifetime achievement as an entrepreneur and leader and honored him for his role in building an empowered culture at TDIndustries that epitomizes the philosophy of leader as servant. In 2005 Jack received the J. Erik Jonsson Ethics Award from the Maguire Center for Ethics and Public Responsibility at Southern Methodist University, and in 2007, was named a Distinguished Alumnus of his high school, Highland Park, in Dallas, Texas.
