= Thomas F. Patton =

Thomas F. Patton may refer to:

- Tom Patton (born 1953), member of the Ohio House of Representatives
- Thomas F. Patton (executive) (1903–2001), president, chairman and chief executive officer of Republic Steel
