= Louis J. Schneider Jr. =

American judge

Louis Jacob Schneider Jr.

Associate Justice of the Ohio Supreme Court
- In office November 1964 – December 31, 1972
- Preceded by: Lynn B. Griffith
- Succeeded by: William B. Brown

Personal details
- Born: September 26, 1921 Cincinnati, Ohio, US
- Died: December 15, 1999 (aged 78) Cincinnati, Ohio, US
- Resting place: Spring Grove Cemetery
- Party: Republican
- Spouse: Ruth Ann Kirkendall
- Children: three
- Education: Princeton University; University of Cincinnati; University of Cincinnati College of Law

Military service
- Allegiance: United States
- Branch/service: United States Army
- Years of service: 1943–1946
- Rank: Lieutenant

Louis Jacob Schneider Jr. (1921–1999) was a Republican lawyer from Ohio who was elected twice to the Ohio Supreme Court. Before his judicial service he was in the Ohio House of Representatives, a county commissioner, the state tax commissioner, and was a legal author.

Schneider was born in Cincinnati, Ohio on September 26, 1921, the son of Louis J. and Florence Schneider. He graduated Cincinnati public schools and attended Princeton University 1939 to 1941. He then attended the University of Cincinnati, graduating in 1943. He then entered the United States Army, commissioned as a first lieutenant. He was discharged in 1946.

Schneider graduated from the Cincinnati Law School in 1949, passed the bar exam, and entered private practice. In 1952, he and his father authored Schneider's Criminal Code, which was reprinted a number of times.

Schneider served in the Ohio House of Representatives from 1951 to 1959, was Hamilton County commissioner from 1959 to 1963, and was Ohio tax commissioner in 1963 and 1964 under Governor Jim Rhodes. In November 1964, he ran for the remaining two years of the unexpired term of James F. Bell, who had resigned in 1962. He defeated Lynn B. Griffith, who had been appointed to the seat by previous governor Michael DiSalle, and was sworn in when the election results were certified.

Schneider ran for a full six-year term on the Supreme Court in 1966, and defeated Clifford F. Brown. He tried for a second full term in 1972, but lost to William B. Brown. He then returned to private practice in Cincinnati.

On September 5, 1947, Schneider was married to Ruth Ann Kirkendall. They had three children. He died December 15, 1999, was cremated, and was interred in Spring Grove Cemetery.
