= Stinziano =

Stinziano is a surname. Notable people with the surname include:

- Michael Stinziano (born 1979), American politician
- Mike Stinziano (fl. 1973–1994), American politician
