= Lynn B. Griffith =

American judge

Associate Justice of the Ohio Supreme Court
- In office October 8, 1962 – December 31, 1964
- Appointed by: Michael DiSalle
- Preceded by: James F. Bell
- Succeeded by: Louis J. Schneider, Jr.

Personal details
- Born: October 30, 1886 West Farmington, Ohio
- Died: July 18, 1978 (aged 91) Warren, Ohio
- Party: Democratic
- Spouse: Stata Norton Miller
- Children: three
- Education: Oberlin College; University of Pennsylvania Law School; Western Reserve University School of Law

Lynn B. Griffith (October 30, 1886 – July 18, 1978) was a judge from Trumbull County, Ohio who was elected multiple times to Ohio Seventh District Court of Appeals and was appointed to the Ohio Supreme Court in 1962.

Griffith was born in West Farmington, Ohio on October 30, 1886, the son of Herbert F. and Lovira M. (Snyder) Griffith. He attended the Mt. Hermon, Massachusetts Boys School, and graduated from Oberlin Academy in 1906. He graduated from Oberlin College in 1910, attended University of Pennsylvania Law School 1911 to 1913, and graduated from Western Reserve University School of Law in 1914. He was admitted to the bar June of that year.

Griffith began a private practice in Warren, Ohio in 1914. In 1925 and 1926, he was Warren City Solicitor. He was Trumbull County, Ohio prosecuting attorney 1927 and 1928. He faced Clarence Darrow in a bribery case that ended in a hung jury. Darrow would later visit the Griffith farm when passing through Trumbull County. Another house-guest of Griffith was William Jennings Bryan, who died a few days after visiting Griffith.

In 1930, Griffith was elected to the Trumbull County Court of Common Pleas, and held that seat until 1950. That year, Governor Frank Lausche appointed Griffith to fill an unexpired term on Ohio Seventh District Court of Appeals. He won re-election in 1954 and 1960. On October 8, 1962, Governor Michael DiSalle appointed Griffith to replace James F. Bell, resigned, on the Ohio Supreme Court. He ran for the unexpired portion of Bell's term in 1964, but was defeated by Louis J. Schneider, Jr.

In 1965, Griffith returned to Warren, and practiced with Letson, Griffith, Knightlinger and Woodall. He was active as a lawyer until he died in Warren on July 18, 1978.

Griffith married Stata Norton Miller on September 9, 1916. They had three children. He was a member of Delta Theta Phi, Masonic Order, Knight's Templar, Knights of Pythias, and was a Democrat.
