= John Low =

John Low may refer to:

- John Low (bishop) (died 1467), bishop of St Asaph, and of Rochester
- Sir John Low (East India Company officer) (1788–1880), British East India Company general and administrator
- John Low, name used by the defendant in United States v. Jackalow (1862)
- John Low (footballer) (1874–?), Scottish footballer
- Sir John Low (charity executive) (born 1953), British charity executive
- John Low (sailor) in 2011 Dragon World Championships

== See also ==
- John Lowe (disambiguation)
