= Kristin Boggs =

American politician and judge

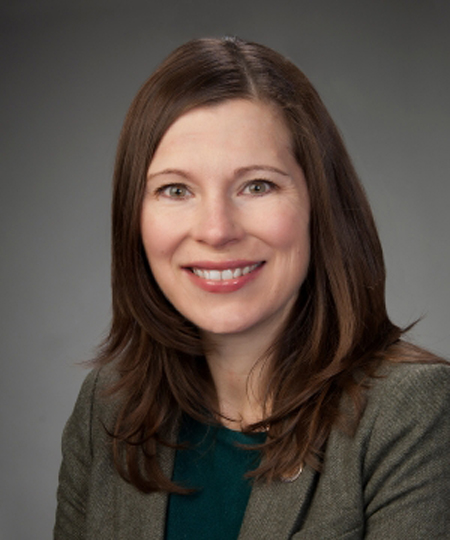

Judge of the Ohio Court of Appeals for the 10th district
- Incumbent
- Assumed office January 1, 2023
- Preceded by: Lisa Sadler

Acting Minority Leader of the Ohio House of Representatives
- In office January 1, 2022 – January 26, 2022
- Preceded by: Emilia Sykes
- Succeeded by: Allison Russo

Member of the Ohio House of Representatives from the 18th district
- In office January 26, 2016 – January 1, 2023
- Preceded by: Michael Stinziano
- Succeeded by: Darnell Brewer

Personal details
- Born: Ashtabula, Ohio, U.S.
- Party: Democratic
- Spouse: Adam Ward
- Relatives: Robert Boggs (dad) Ross Boggs (uncle)
- Education: Kent State University (BA); Cleveland State University (JD)

Kristin S. Boggs is an American politician and judge. A member of the Democratic Party, She served as the state representative for the 18th District of the Ohio House of Representatives from 2016 to 2023. The district includes portions of Columbus including the German Village, Italian Village, Victorian Village, the Short North, Franklinton, Downtown Columbus and Ohio State University, as well as Bexley and Grandview Heights in Franklin County.

In 2023, she began serving as a judge on the 10th district of the Ohio Court of Appeals.

== Life and career ==
Boggs was born in Ashtabula and raised in Jefferson, and is the daughter of Robert Boggs, a former member of the Ohio House of Representatives, Democratic Leader in the Ohio Senate, as well as a former director of the Ohio Department of Agriculture. She attended Kent State University before joining the Americorps.

Following her time with the Americorps, Boggs attended the Cleveland Marshall College of Law, and began working as an Ohio Assistant Attorney General in 2007. Boggs dedicated nearly a decade to the Ohio Attorney General’s Office, where she focused on a number of issues, including predatory lending and fair wages for workers.

She is a resident of the Italian Village in Columbus.

== Ohio House of Representatives ==
In 2015, Representative Michael Stinziano won election to the Columbus City Council and resigned from his seat. The Ohio Democratic House Caucus chose Boggs from a number of candidates to replace him, and she was appointed to finish out his term on January 26, 2016.

Boggs was elected to her first term in November 2016. She defeated Republican and Green Party opponents by obtaining more than 66% of the vote.

== Ohio Court of Appeals ==
In 2022, Boggs was elected as a judge on the 10th district of the Ohio Court of Appeals. In 2023, she began serving.

Ohio House of Representatives
| Preceded by Michael Stinziano | Member of the Ohio House of Representatives from the 18th district 2016–present | Incumbent |
| Preceded by Emilia Sykes | Minority Leader of the Ohio House of Representatives; Acting; 2022 | Succeeded by Allison Russo |
