= Buffalo, Guernsey County, Ohio =

Buffalo, Ohio
- Census-designated place
- Location within Ohio Location within the United States
- Coordinates: 39°55′01″N 81°31′14″W
- Country: United States
- State: Ohio
- County: Guernsey
- Township: Valley

Area
  - Total: 0.49 sq mi (1.27 km^{2})
  - Land: 0.49 sq mi (1.27 km^{2})
  - Water: 0 sq mi (0.00 km^{2})
- Elevation: 846 ft (258 m)

Population (2020)
  - Total: 373
  - Density: 761.0/sq mi (293.84/km^{2})
- Time zone: UTC-5 (Eastern (EST))
  - Summer (DST): UTC-4 (EDT)
- ZIP code: 43722
- Area code: 740
- FIPS code: 39-10128
- GNIS feature ID: 2628869

Buffalo is an unincorporated community and census-designated place in eastern Valley Township, Guernsey County, Ohio, United States. As of the 2020 census it had a population of 373. It has a post office with the ZIP code 43722. It lies along State Route 313.

== History ==
Buffalo was originally called "Hartford", and under the latter name was platted in 1836. A post office called Buffalo has been in operation since 1839.

== Demographics ==
Historical population
Census	Pop.	Note	%±
2020	373		—
U.S. Decennial Census

== Notable person ==
- Howard E. Faught - judge and Ohio Supreme Court member
