= Dan Stewart (politician) =

American politician

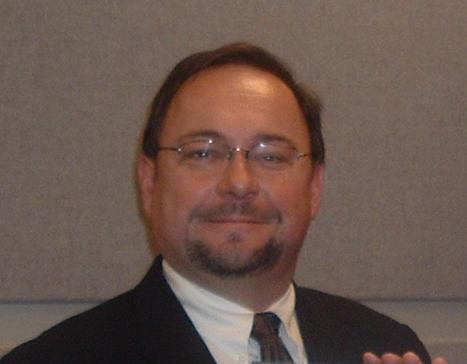
- Dan Stewart in his office

Member of the Ohio House of Representatives from the 25th district
- In office January 3, 2003-December 31, 2010
- Preceded by: Amy Salerno
- Succeeded by: Michael Stinziano

Personal details
- Born: September 27, 1963 (age 63) Columbus, Ohio
- Party: Democratic
- Education: Ohio State University
- Profession: Community Advocate, Politician Liaison

Dan Stewart (born September 27, 1963) is a Democrat who served in the Ohio House of Representatives.

== Life and career ==
Stewart was born and raised on Columbus's west side. The 1974 West High School graduate resides in the Hilltop area of Columbus.

== Ohio House of Representatives ==
A lifelong resident of Columbus, Ohio, Stewart ran for the Ohio House of Representatives in 2002, after Republican Amy Salerno was term limited from running for another term. Stewart won handily and was seated in 2003. A voracious liberal, Stewart advocated for civil rights, workers rights, and the environment as a state representative. While a swing area, Stewart again won election to a second term in 2004.

Stewart again won reelection in 2006, in a year where Democrats almost regained the majority in the House. They did so in 2008, when Stewart won his final term. As a result of their new majority and Stewart's seniority, he was named as Chairman of the House Elections and Ethics Committee. Term limited from running again in 2010, Stewart ran for the Ohio Senate, however, faced a crowded primary for the Democratic nomination.

Against Charleta Tavares and newcomer Oyango Snell, Stewart placed second, losing to Tavares. He sought a seat on Columbus City Council, but was unsuccessful. He has since returned to the private sector.
