= John Lowe (indologist) =

John Jeffrey Lowe is a linguist and a professor of sanskrit at the Wolfson College, University of Oxford. He is also a faculty member at the Faculty of Oriental Studies, Oxford, specialising in Indo-Iranian historical philology and Sanskrit grammar. He is currently in charge of and coordinating the LINGUINDIC (Linguistics from India: new ideas for modern linguistics from ancient India) project under the European Research Council, as its Principal Investigator, at Oxford.

== Education ==
Lowe did his bachelors in arts (honours) in classics and oriental studies from the University of Oxford, pursued post-graduation in linguistics and philology at Oxford, and received a DPhil from Oxford in 2012. He began his career as a Leverhulme Early Career Researcher at the Faculty of Linguistics, Oxford.

== Books ==
Lowe is coauthor of The Oxford Reference Guide to Lexical Functional Grammar, with Mary Dalrymple and Louise Mycock (Oxford University Press, 2019). He is the author of Participles in Rigvedic Sanskrit: The Syntax and Semantics of Adjectival Verb Forms (Oxford University Press, 2015), and of Transitive Nouns and Adjectives: Evidence from Early Indo-Aryan (Oxford University Press, 2017).
