= John Low (charity executive) =

Sir John Menzies Low, CBE, CEng, FRSA (born 1 July 1953) is an international civil society leader, with a commercial background in science, technology and engineering. From 2007 to 2020, he was group chief executive of the Charities Aid Foundation (CAF). He was previously the chief executive of the Royal National Institute for Deaf People (RNID). Since 2022, John has been Chair of JTL, the leading training provider for the Building Services Engineering sector.

== Early life and education ==
Low was born in Aberdeen on 1 July 1953 and he was educated at Northfield Secondary School and Aberdeen Academy. He studied Electronic Engineering at Robert Gordon’s Institute of Technology, graduating Bachelor of Science (BSc) in 1975. Low undertook postgraduate research in Medical Physics at the University of Aberdeen between 1975 and 1979, examining auditory feedback and its effects on speech fluency, leading to Master of Science (MSc) and Doctor of Philosophy (PhD). He was education in business management at Templeton College, University of Oxford (AMP) and National School of Government, Cabinet Office (TMP).

== Career ==
His early commercial career was in research and development with specialist engineering and technology businesses. In 1984 he was appointed Technical Director at William McGeoch & Co, before taking up the role of R&D Director at Sortex Ltd in 1988, a specialist division within the Swiss technology group Bühler AG. Sortex was an innovator in machine vision and automated sorting systems. Bühler’s website states, “Two billion people each day enjoy foods produced on Bühler equipment.”

After 20 years in the technology industry, Low moved to the voluntary sector in 1999, initially as Executive Director of Research at the Royal National Institute for Deaf People (RNID), appointed Chief Executive in 2002. RNID is the largest charity for the UK’s 9 million deaf and hard of hearing people.

In 2007 Low was appointed group Chief Executive of the Charities Aid Foundation (CAF). In notes published by the Cabinet Office to accompany his Knighthood in 2017, Low is credited as having, “overseen a significant increase in the funds raised from donors and distributed to charities; developed a vehicle to provide charities with early stage capital; restructured and recapitalised the Charity Bank; created an extensive research wing; and made the Foundation the core co-ordinating voice for the charity sector as a whole.” He left CAF and retired from executive management in 2020.

Low has also been Chair of the Association of Chief Executives of Voluntary Organisations (ACEVO); director of Charity Bank Ltd; a founder and President of Euclid Network - the European network of social entrepreneurs and civil society leaders; served on the House of Lords Appointment Commission and as a member of Council at City University of London.

He is currently Chair of the Potanin Foundation. and Secretary of Hertford Baptist Church. From 2018 to 2022 Chair of the BBC Appeals Advisory Committee, And most recently, Chair of JTL, the UK's leading training provider of Electrical and Plumbing & Heating apprenticeships.

== Honours ==
Low was appointed Commander of the Order of the British Empire (CBE) in the Queen's Birthday Honours 2008 for services to the voluntary sector and to deaf people.

In the Queen's Birthday Honours 2017, Low was appointed Knight Bachelor for charitable services.
