= Jack Lowe Sr. =

American businessman (1913 – 1980)

Jack Lowe Sr.

John B. Jack Lowe Sr. (July 22, 1913 – 1980) was a Dallas native who founded Texas Distributors Inc.

Lowe also served as a chairman of the multiracial Dallas Alliance Education Task Force, which worked to develop a widely accepted school desegregation plan. The plan was adopted almost word-for-word by the United States federal courts. In 1976, Lowe was awarded Dallas' highest community service accolades—the Linz Award—for his work on the Dallas Alliance Education Task Force.

Lowe also helped strengthen the Greater Dallas Council of Churches and he served on the Citizens Council. He was active on the boards of the Community Relations Commission, Salvation Army, American Red Cross, Urban League, YMCA and Girl Scout Council. He also was a member and chairman of the Cotton Bowl Athletic Association, the Salesmanship Club of Dallas and the Dallas Kiwanis Club.

== Early life ==
Jack Lowe Sr.'s father, John Burford Lowe, was a traveling insurance salesman. Lowe's mother, Florence, went to work as a stenographer for Dallas Power & Light (DP&L). By 1924, she worked as secretary to C.W. Davis, who was then the general manager of DP&L.

She taught Jack Lowe pride and self-reliance, fed and clothed him, and putting him through college during the heart of the Great Depression.

=== High school and college years ===
Lowe was the salutatorian of his class at North Oak Cliff High School, now titled Adamson. He was active in the Scholarship Club, Hi-Y, and was a member of the Oak Staff. He served as vice president of the National Honor Society and won the Efficiency Pin. In high school he belonged to the City Crack Company and the State Crack Company of 1927 that marched at the State Fair.

Two months after Lowe began his senior year at North Oak Cliff High, the stock market crashed. Job opportunities for high school seniors were limited, but Lowe got a scholarship to Rice University.

== Post-graduation ==
Lowe left Rice with a degree in electrical engineering and was assigned to the General Electric Company (GE)'s training facility at Schenectady, New York. GE had formed an Air Conditioning Department at Bloomfield, New Jersey in 1932, and Lowe was transferred there after completing training at Schenectady. The management put him to work at selling and overseeing the installation of large commercial units in the region just south of the Great Lakes. In 1938 at the age of twenty-five, Lowe was chosen to superintend the installation of an air conditioning system at Wolf and Dessars, the largest department store in Fort Wayne, Indiana.

While in Fort Wayne, Lowe married Harriet Fuelber, the daughter of a prominent local attorney, just three weeks after their first date. Jack Lowe Jr. was born in 1939. GE moved Lowe Sr. and Fuelber frequently, and Lowe and Fuelber were transferred to Dallas, where Lowe took on the job of finding more GE customers in North Texas. A year later, their second child, Ann, was born, and Lowe became district manager over air conditioning, just before the country went to war.

== The War years ==
When the country went to war, GE promptly declared Lowe vital to the war effort and arranged a deferment which he just as promptly refused to accept. He did not think he deserved it, and within months of the bombing of Pearl Harbor, Jack enlisted in the Army. When the Navy rejected him because of poor eyesight, he memorized the eye chart and passed the Army physical. He refused an officer's commission and entered the Army as an enlisted man. He was assigned to Signal Corps projects stateside for the duration of the war, and eventually discharged in San Antonio shortly after the bombing of Hiroshima and Nagasaki.

GE was never extremely pleased that Lowe had quit them when the war began, and the position they offered him when he returned was not the position he thought he deserved. He was tired of traveling, and of being away from his family so much, and at GE he had begun to feel like an increasingly insignificant part of an increasingly large company. Jack was thirty-two years old when he came out of the Army, and within a few months he had founded a company he called Texas Distributors, Inc.

== Texas Distributors, Inc. ==
As the founder of Texas Distributors, Inc., Lowe served as the technical father, but he carried that title to a personal level too. Texas Distributors was not only a wholesaler and an air conditioning contractor that provided a service to its customers and, hopefully, made a profit—it provided a steady employment and financial security for those who chose to work there. The profit-sharing plans were designed to limit cash outflow, and that helped employees by helping the company, but they also offered employees the opportunity to establish financial resources beyond their biweekly paychecks.

One morning late in 1954, Lowe organised a rare closed-door discussion with his vice presidents in his office. Lowe announced in a quiet voice that he had contracted tuberculosis. He withdrew from the operation of the company with immediate effect in order to undergo treatment. Surviving from tuberculosis depended on early detection, regular medication, at least nine months of nearly absolute inactivity, and in extreme cases, surgery.

Lowe had surgery to remove the affected lung tissue and underwent another six months of recuperation. Eighteen months passed before he was able to start work again. Lowe began to look at Texas Distributors as less as an instrument for the production of wealth than as a device that could create well-being for the growing number of people who were a part of it.

In the early 1970s, the company was not exceptionally productive, and while sales were up, income was not. Morale was low in some areas, and lowe came up with the idea of meeting with small groups of employees at his home. Before each meeting, participants received the usual packet of information about the company, but they also got a copy of “Robert K. Greenleaf's booklet, “The Servant as Leader.” The result of the employee meetings was The People Objective which stated how employees thought Texas Distributors employees should operate.

From the beginning, Lowe believed that in order to keep control of his company, he had to always own a majority of its stock, but from nearly the beginning, he began offering shares of voting stock to his officers. Later, when the first major cash crisis moved him to approach his employees with the problem, and to offer them a chance to invest in the company, the stock they received had no voting rights connected to it. In the early 1960s, Lowe began to offer more and more voting stock to his officers and to depend on their participation in major decisions. In 1964, as Jack Lowe Jr. entered the company, Lowe Sr. gave up his controlling ownership position. Still, he remained the dominant force in the company. In 1978, the decision was made to extend voting rights to all company stock on a one-share, one-vote basis. Texas Distributor's stock plan was designed so that it benefitted most those who had been with the company the longest and who held the greatest responsibility.

== The church ==
Lowe joined the Highland Park United Methodist Church because of his admiration for its pastor, the Rev. William H. Dickinson. Located in one of Dallas' wealthiest areas, the church had some of the most influential people in the city as its members. Lowe and Dickinson worked on ideas that would improve the church, and encouraged the congregation to confront social and economic problems in the community.

In the late 1960s, Dickinson recommended Lowe to lead the Greater Dallas Council of Churches, and the leadership accepted him. The Council of Churches became a legitimate agency of the churches through which they could work “for justice and what is best for the City of Dallas” rather than a way of mobilizing area churches to support the policies of the Dallas Citizens Council. Lowe remained president for three years. He successfully increased the budget, and two programs were begun: one a citywide counseling service staffed by ministers, and the other a permanent ministry at the county jail. A third program and by far the most controversial was Block Partnership, a plan to help solve problems in minority neighborhoods and to improve race relations by linking them with comparatively affluent white church groups. More than fifty partnerships were established between black and white neighborhoods, and a lot of problems were solved.

== School desegregation ==
(Left to right) Walt Humann, Lowe, Rene Martinez, and Zan Holmes at a press Conference announcing the formation of the Dallas Alliance in 1975.

After the 1930s, Dallas was controlled in all aspects by the Dallas Citizens Council, a group of about two hundred men who had both achieved unusual success in their careers and demonstrated an unusual willingness to work on projects they believed would help build a great city. In 1954 with the U.S. Supreme Court's decision to end racial segregation in public schools, the Citizens Council soon acknowledged that desegregation was inevitable, and they sought to make the best of it. The first step was the formation of the Biracial Committee. For the most part, the Citizens Council had already decided what to do, and the Biracial Committee helped get it done. They decided to prepare for school desegregation by desegregating the community bit by bit.

By 1960, changes were in place, but in one respect, nothing much had happened. Desegregation was still only tolerated, not embraced, by the general public. Lowe saw the first racial changes from his position as president and chairman of the Cotton Bowl Athletic Association. By the early 1960s, he was on the board of the Salesmanship Club, and by 1965, he was president of the Salesmanship Club and a member of the Citizens Council. In 1968, he was entrusted with leadership of the Greater Dallas Council of Churches and then the Community Relations Commission, both of which pushed him into the center of local race relations.

In 1971 the U.S. Supreme Court ruled that students could be bused in order to achieve racial desegregation, and after a compelling presentation by a group of young, minority men known as the “Dirty Dozen,” the Chamber of Commerce established a small Urban Affairs Office. The Urban Affairs Committee guided the Chamber's urban program which set about trying to address problems identified by the Dirty Dozen. Lowe was a member of this committee. It became clear to the committee that solving social problems would require involvement from more people and a more representative group of people, but they knew minorities would never participate in an organization controlled by the Chamber of Commerce.

The Chamber of Commerce agreed to fund the new Dallas Alliance, and both the leadership and minorities in the Alliance looked to Lowe for assurance. In 1975, the 5th U.S. Circuit Court of Appeals in New Orleans remanded U.S. District Judge William M. Taylor's desegregation order and a new plan was called for. Taylor challenged the city to come up with solutions and to help make them work. He offered amicus curiae, or “friend of the court,” status to any group willing to get involved in the effort, and in the fall of 1975, he approached Lowe with the idea of getting the city's three largest ethnic groups to talk together in some semblance of equality and reach an agreement that would satisfy the great majority of the people. The Dallas Alliance Task Force was formed.

The Task Force membership fell into several informal groupings that generally reflected the racial or ideological make-up of the city, and the Task Force operated on the idea that developing the ability to agree was its most important goal. If a certain topic was going to be discussed at the next meeting, Lowe made sure to talk to everyone individually on the topic beforehand, so he knew the direction to take the meeting. The Task Force came close to falling apart came later on during a crucial period when Lowe was diagnosed with an irregular heartbeat. He had a pacemaker implanted, and his absence meant Task Force discussions broke down almost immediately. But a quick recovery was made, both for Lowe and the Task Force. The Task Force reached an agreement and presented its plan for desegregating Dallas public schools to Judge Taylor. The plan was accepted essentially as written.

== Final years ==
Lowe continued his involvement with the Dallas Alliance and implementing school desegregation. Jack also helped to get the busing to run properly and to increase district revenue. The presidency of the Dallas Alliance passed to Walter Humann in 1976, but by 1978, Lowe was again elected president of the Alliance and began to direct its attention to county jail improvements. He became involved in a leadership training program and worked at increasing minority membership on civic boards. Lowe's last tenure with the Alliance began when he was sixty-five, and as its end neared two years later, the group was considering amending its bylaws to allow him to serve yet another term. But Jack collapsed as he was on his way to a Dallas Citizens Council Luncheon shortly before the end of his term as president, and he died over a week later on Thanksgiving Day, 1980. His son Jack Lowe Jr. succeeded him as CEO of Texas Distributors, which had been earlier renamed as TDIndustries.

== Legacy ==
Jack Lowe Sr. Elementary School was opened in Dallas, TX, in recognition of Lowe's successful efforts to peacefully desegregate Dallas ISD.
