= John Law (cricketer) =

English cricketer

Personal information
- Full name: John Alexander Gordon Charles Law
- Born: 25 March 1923; Bangalore, Mysore, British India
- Died: 19 August 2004 (aged 81); Montreal, Quebec, Canada
- Batting: Right-handed
- Role: Wicket-keeper

Domestic team information
- Years: Team
- 1940/41–1944/45: Europeans
- 1940/41–1941/42: Madras
- 1949: Oxford University

Career statistics
Competition	First-class
Matches	9
Runs scored	194
Batting average	11.41
100s/50s	–/–
Top score	35
Catches/stumpings	16/3
- Source: ESPNcricinfo, 5 July 2020

John Alexander Gordon Charles Law (25 March 1923 – 19 August 2004) was an English first-class cricketer.

Law was born in British India at Bangalore in March 1923. He was the elder son of Harry Law, a forester from Glasgow, and his wife Phyllis Margaret (nee Taylor). His younger brother Robert died in infancy and he had a younger sister Margaret (b 1929).he was educated at Edinburgh Academy.

He made his debut in first-class cricket in British India for the Europeans against the Indians in the 1940/41 Madras Presidency Matches. In early 1941, he made two first-class appearances for Madras in the Ranji Trophy. Law served in the Second World War after gaining an emergency commission in the Royal Artillery in March 1941. Later in 1941, he made a third appearance for Madras in the Ranji Trophy, and further appearances for the Europeans followed in the 1942/43, 1943/44 and 1944/45 Presidency Matches.

After the war, Law studied Jurisprudence in England at St Edmund Hall, Oxford. He made two first-class appearances for Oxford University against Lancashire and the touring New Zealanders at Oxford in 1949. In all he played nine first-class matches as a wicket-keeper, scoring 194 runs at an average of 11.41 with a highest score of 35. Behind the stumps he took 16 catches and made three stumpings.

After leaving Oxford, he trained as a Chartered Accountant with Peat Marwick Mitchell & Co in London and worked for the same firm in Paris and Geneva. He emigrated to Montreal, Canada in 1958. His subsequent working life was spent with Canadian National Railways. He never married and had no children.

In 1999 Law fell down the outside stairs at his house in Montreal and broke his neck. He used a wheelchair for the rest of his life. Law died in Canada at Montreal in August 2004.
