= John Law (footballer, born 1887) =

Scottish footballer

Personal information
- Date of birth: 1877
- Place of birth: Dumfries, Scotland
- Position: Winger

Senior career*
Years	Team	Apps	(Gls)
1905–1906	Maxwelltown Volunteers		
1906	Sunderland	1	(0)
1906–1907	Rangers	0	(0)
1907	Lincoln City	19	(0)
1907–1908	King's Own Scottish Borderers		
1908	Gainsborough Trinity	9	(1)
1908	King's Own Scottish Borderers		
1908–1909	Leith Athletic		
1909–1910	Carlisle United		
1910–1911	Rangers	0	(0)
1911–1912	King's Own Scottish Borderers		
1912	Kilmarnock	2	(0)
1912–1913	Falkirk	4	(1)
1913–1914	Abercorn	21	(4)
1914–19??	Queen of the South		
- * Club domestic league appearances and goals

John Law (born 1877) was a Scottish professional footballer who played as a winger for Sunderland. His clubs in his homeland included Abercorn.
