= Howard E. Faught =

American judge

Howard Elliott Faught

Associate Justice of the Ohio Supreme Court
- In office October 1950 – December 1950
- Appointed by: Frank Lausche
- Preceded by: Edward C. Turner
- Succeeded by: Henry A. Middleton

Personal details
- Born: August 1, 1907 Buffalo, Guernsey County, Ohio, US
- Died: May 8, 1955 (aged 47) Ohio, US
- Resting place: Northwood Cemetery, Cambridge
- Party: Democratic
- Spouse: Letha Jones Theherne
- Education: Detroit Art School; Muskingum College; Ohio State University Law School

Howard Elliott Faught (1907–1955) was a Democratic lawyer from Ohio. He was a local judge, and was appointed to the Ohio Supreme Court, serving for a portion of the year 1950.

Faught was born in Buffalo, Guernsey County, Ohio, on August 1, 1907, the son of Arthur G. and Hattie Hollenbeck Faught. For five years after graduating from high school, he set up store window displays in Detroit, Michigan, while attending Detroit Art School. In 1932 he moved back to Ohio and enrolled in Muskingum College, majoring in pre-law. He entered Ohio State University College of Law in 1935, and graduated in 1938. He passed the Ohio bar in July 1938, and began practice in Cambridge, Ohio, with Melton Boyd, Robert E. Scott, A. R. McCulloch and Frank R. Danello. He was elected prosecuting Attorney of Guernsey County in 1940 as a Democrat, but defeated in a re-election bid in 1944.

In 1945, a death caused a vacancy on the Guernsey County Court of Common Pleas. Governor Frank Lausche appointed Faught to the seat, and he won election to the unexpired four years of the term in 1946. He chose not to run for re-election in 1950.

Edward C. Turner, an associate justice of the Ohio Supreme Court died on September 13, 1950. Governor Lausche appointed Faught to the seat on September 27, and he was seated October 4. The Ohio Constitution requires that any judicial vacancy that occurs more than 40 days before the next general election can only be filled until that election. Lack of time before the November election necessitated a write-in election, and Faught came in third behind winner Henry A. Middleton. Faught only served until the election results were certified by the Ohio Secretary of State.

Faught returned to Cambridge, and worked with the firm Willis, Danello, Faught & Moorehead. In 1952 he challenged incumbent Charles B. McClintock for his seat on the 5th District Court of Appeals of Ohio, but lost. He was elected to represent his county in the Ohio House of Representatives in 1954.

Faught married Letha Jones Theherne on Aug. 1, 1947. They had no children. He died May 8, 1955, and is buried at Northwood Cemetery in Cambridge.
