= Henry A. Middleton =

American judge

Henry Arthur Middleton

Associate Justice of the Ohio Supreme Court
- In office November 1950 – December 1954
- Preceded by: Howard E. Faught
- Succeeded by: James F. Bell

Personal details
- Born: July 19, 1888 Urbana, Ohio
- Died: March 28, 1975 (aged 86) Toledo, Ohio
- Party: Republican
- Spouse: Myrtle E. Johnson
- Children: James A.
- Education: Boston University, Moritz College of Law

Henry Arthur Middleton (July 19, 1888 – March 28, 1975) was a Republican lawyer from Toledo, Ohio, United States who served four years as a judge on the Ohio Supreme Court.

== Biography ==
Henry Arthur Middleton was born in Urbana, Champaign County, Ohio in 1888 to Arthur N. and Alice Taylor Middleton. He was raised in Springfield, Ohio by his adoptive parents, Charles and Mary E. Dodson. He attended Boston University, and graduated from Ohio State University College of Law in 1911, when he was admitted to the bar and joined the Columbus, Ohio law firm Wilson and Rector.

In 1917, Middleton returned to Champaign County, and entered the United States Army Artillery during World War I. He was honorably discharged in 1919 as a Captain, and moved to Toledo, Ohio, where he joined Brown, Geddes, Schemettau, & Williams. He became a partner in 1921, and remained with that and succeeding firms for thirty years.

Middleton had a two-year term as president of the Toledo Chamber of Commerce beginning in 1938. He formed the firm Middleton, Morgan & Leatherman in 1949.

On September 13, 1950, Edward C. Turner of the Ohio Supreme Court died. Governor Frank Lausche appointed Howard E. Faught to fill the vacancy. The vacancy occurred more than forty days before the next general election, so Faught had to run for election to complete the term. Too little time remained for a primary nomination or for ballots to be printed, so Faught and his opponents had to run as write-in candidates. Middleton received more votes than the combined total of his seven opponents.

Middleton served the remaining four years of Turner's term, but was defeated for re-election by Democrat James F. Bell in 1954. He returned to Toledo and private practice, and represented the Toledo, St. Louis and Western Railroad.

Middleton married Myrtle E. Johnson in 1907 and had one son, James A. Middleton. When Judge Middleton died March 28, 1975, he was the last surviving member of the Last Man's Club of World War I Veterans of Lucas County. He is buried in Urbana. He was a member of the I.O.O.F., Methodist Church, and American Legion.
