= West Farmington, Ohio =

Village in Trumbull County, Ohio, United States

- Village
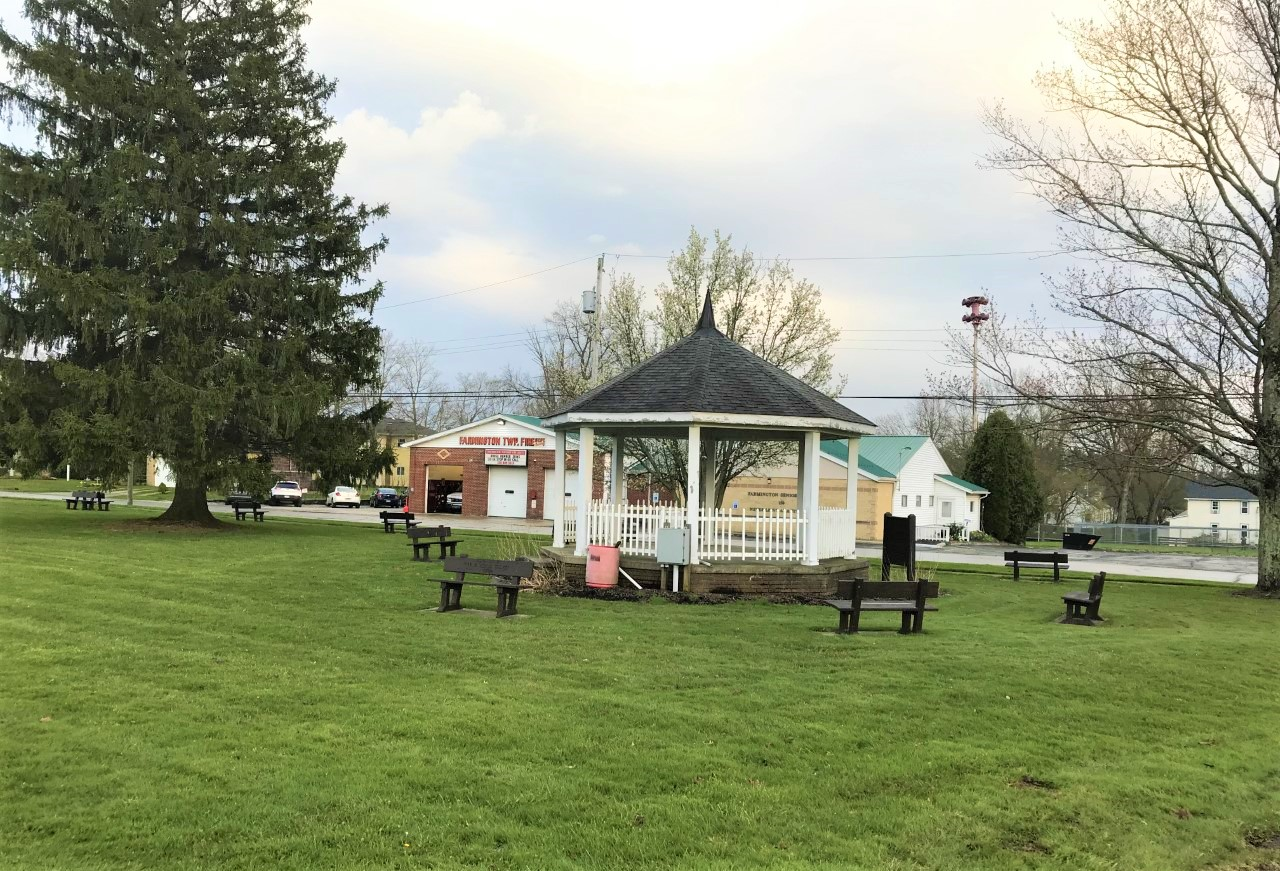
- West Farmington Park

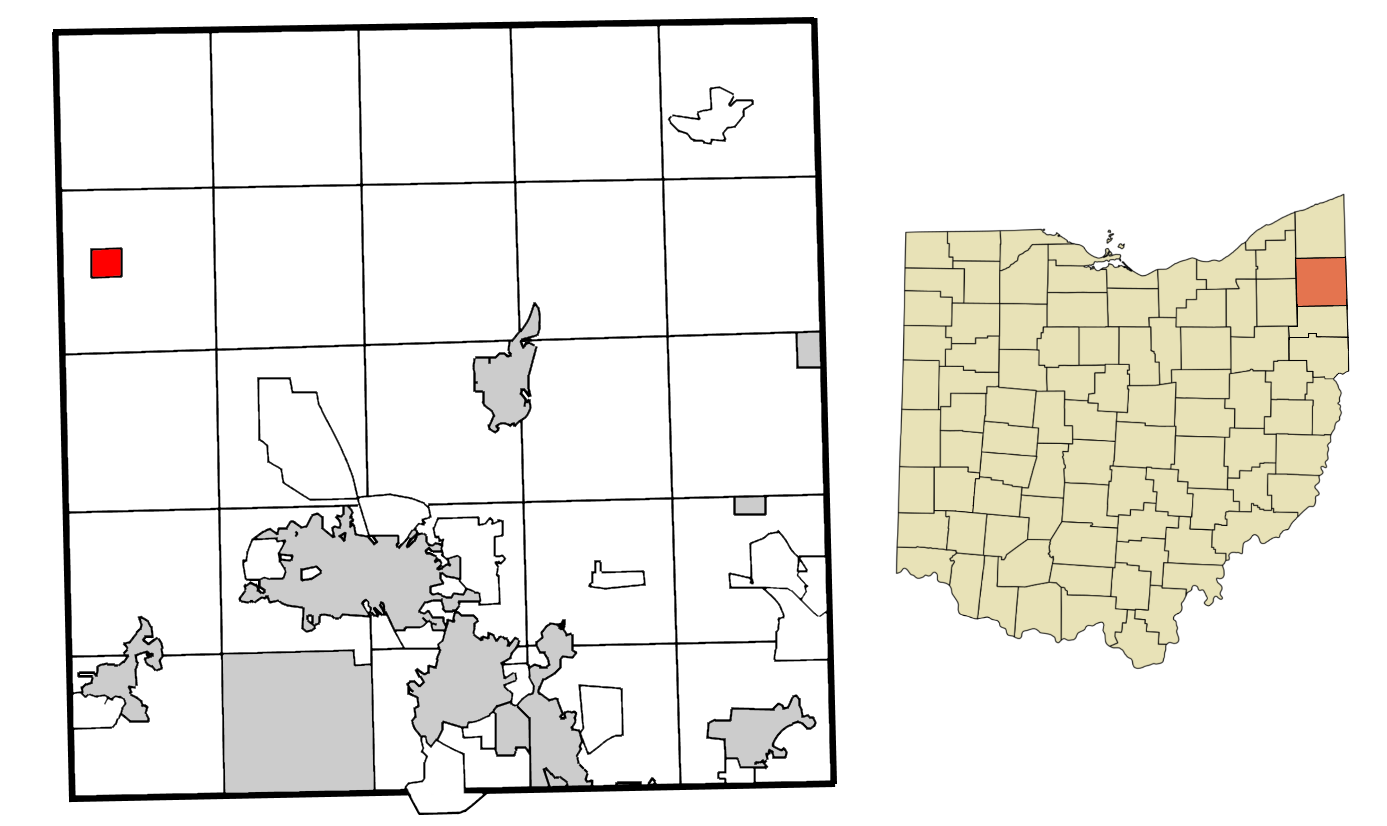
- Location of West Farmington in Trumbull County, Ohio.
- Coordinates: 41°23′28″N 80°58′26″W
- Country: United States
- State: Ohio
- County: Trumbull

Area
  - Total: 0.90 sq mi (2.34 km^{2})
  - Land: 0.90 sq mi (2.34 km^{2})
  - Water: 0 sq mi (0.00 km^{2})
- Elevation: 869 ft (265 m)

Population (2020)
  - Total: 542
  - Density: 600.5/sq mi (231.84/km^{2})
- Time zone: UTC-5 (Eastern (EST))
  - Summer (DST): UTC-4 (EDT)
- ZIP code: 44491
- Area codes: 234/330
- FIPS code: 39-83384
- GNIS feature ID: 2400131

West Farmington is a village in northwestern Trumbull County, Ohio, United States, along the Grand River. The population was 542 at the 2020 census. It is part of the Youngstown–Warren metropolitan area.

== Geography ==
According to the United States Census Bureau, the village has a total area of 0.88 square miles (2.28 km^{2}), all land.

== Demographics ==
Historical population
Census	Pop.	Note	%±
1880	260		—
1900	516		—
1910	446		−13.6%
1920	317		−28.9%
1930	418		31.9%
1940	483		15.6%
1950	579		19.9%
1960	614		6.0%
1970	650		5.9%
1980	563		−13.4%
1990	542		−3.7%
2000	519		−4.2%
2010	499		−3.9%
2020	542		8.6%
U.S. Decennial Census

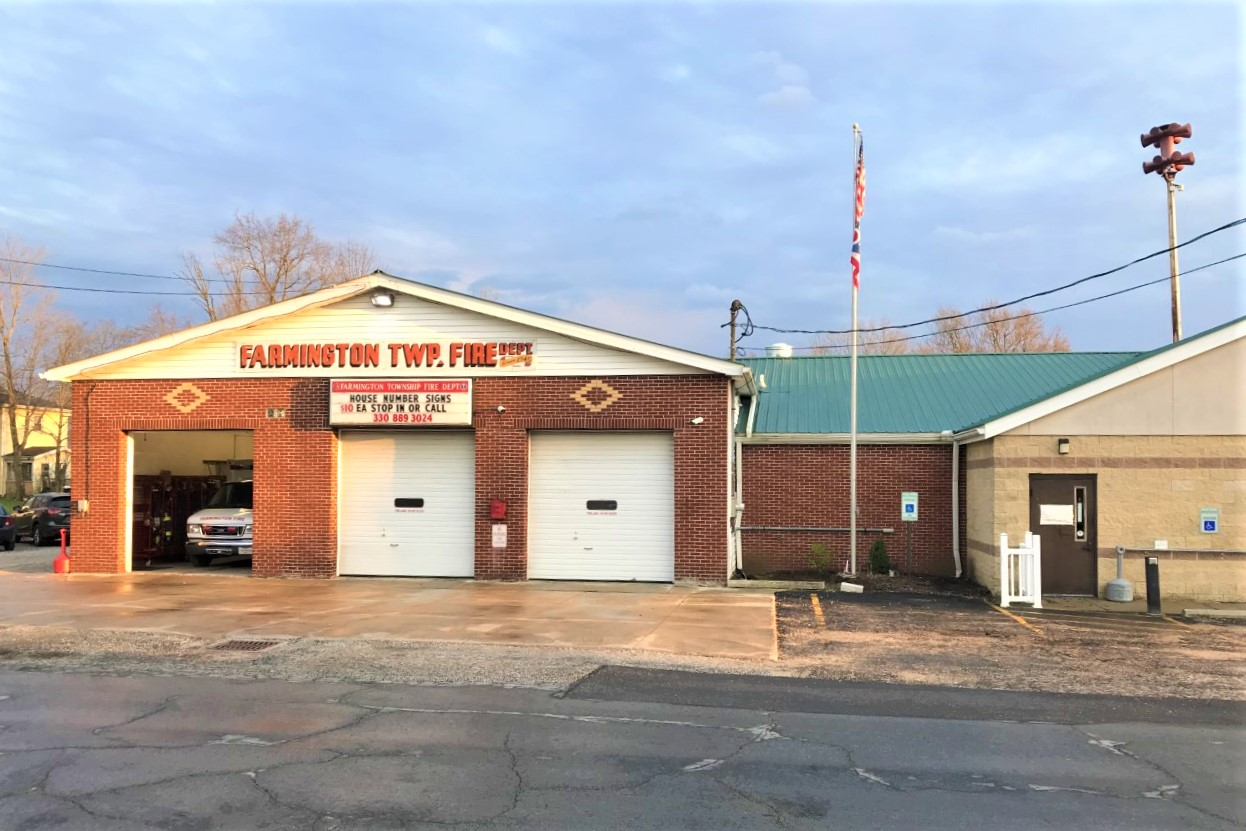
West Farmington fire station

=== 2010 census ===
As of the census of 2010, there were 499 people, 171 households, and 127 families living in the village. The population density was 567.0 inhabitants per square mile (218.9/km^{2}). There were 201 housing units at an average density of 228.4 per square mile (88.2/km^{2}). The racial makeup of the village was 98.8% White, 0.4% Native American, and 0.8% from two or more races. Hispanic or Latino of any race were 0.2% of the population.

There were 171 households, of which 39.2% had children under the age of 18 living with them, 56.1% were married couples living together, 9.9% had a female householder with no husband present, 8.2% had a male householder with no wife present, and 25.7% were non-families. 19.3% of all households were made up of individuals, and 5.9% had someone living alone who was 65 years of age or older. The average household size was 2.92 and the average family size was 3.34.

The median age in the village was 32.3 years. 29.9% of residents were under the age of 18; 8.7% were between the ages of 18 and 24; 29.8% were from 25 to 44; 21.8% were from 45 to 64; and 9.6% were 65 years of age or older. The gender makeup of the village was 51.7% male and 48.3% female.

=== 2000 census ===
As of the census of 2000, there were 519 people, 188 households, and 137 families living in the village. The population density was 591.3 inhabitants per square mile (228.3/km^{2}). There were 204 housing units at an average density of 232.4 per square mile (89.7/km^{2}). The racial makeup of the village was 99.42% White, 0.39% African American and 0.19% Native American.

There were 188 households, out of which 43.1% had children under the age of 18 living with them, 56.4% were married couples living together, 10.6% had a female householder with no husband present, and 26.6% were non-families. 24.5% of all households were made up of individuals, and 8.0% had someone living alone who was 65 years of age or older. The average household size was 2.76 and the average family size was 3.24.

In the village, the population was spread out, with 32.8% under the age of 18, 7.7% from 18 to 24, 31.0% from 25 to 44, 19.8% from 45 to 64, and 8.7% who were 65 years of age or older. The median age was 32 years. For every 100 females there were 95.1 males. For every 100 females age 18 and over, there were 92.8 males.

The median income for a household in the village was $41,146, and the median income for a family was $45,417. Males had a median income of $30,625 versus $25,268 for females. The per capita income for the village was $15,944. About 3.9% of families and 8.9% of the population were below the poverty line, including 6.8% of those under age 18 and 6.8% of those age 65 or over.
