= Donald Clinton Power =

American businessman (1899–1979)

- Born: December 25, 1899
- Died: March 11, 1979 (aged 79); Madison, Ohio
- Education: Ohio State B.A. Ohio State, J.D.
- Years active: 1950-1970
- Employer: GTE
- Title: Chairman; Chief Executive Officer

Donald Clinton Power (December 25, 1899 – March 11, 1979 in Madison, Ohio) was a president, chairman and chief executive officer of GTE Corporation.

== Career ==
Power began his career as a lawyer in Columbus, Ohio, where he was Assistant State Attorney General and then an attorney for the Public Utilities Commission from 1933 to 1936. He also taught at Ohio State University (OSU) from 1922 to 1939 and was a chairman of the university's board of trustees. He was secretary to former Ohio Governor John W. Bricker from 1939 to 1943.

Power was president of GTE Corporation from 1950 to 1961, then chairman and CEO from 1961 to 1970. He was “the first major architect” of the company guiding it through multiple major acquisitions, greatly expanding its reach, research and development to become one of the largest companies in the United States.

== Education ==
Power received his bachelor's degree from OSU in 1922. He received his law degree from Moritz College of Law in 1926.
