= Linda L. Ammons =

7th Dean of Widener University School of Law
- In office 2006–2014

Personal details
- Education: Oakwood (B.A.); Ohio State (M.A.) (J.D.)
- Occupation: Professor; Lawyer; Administrator

Linda L. Ammons was the seventh dean of the Widener University School of Law. Ammons was the first woman and the first African American to lead the Widener School of Law and the longest-serving African American female dean of any law school in the United States.

== Legal career ==
Ammons served as executive assistant to former Ohio governor Richard F. Celeste, from 1988 to 1991, advising him on legal and policy matters in the criminal justice, regulatory and administrative areas. She was appointed to both the Ohio Supreme Court Futures Commission, as well as to the Ohio Public Defender's Commission, on which she served two four-year terms.

Ammons entered academia in 1991 when she joined the faculty of the Cleveland State University Cleveland-Marshall College of Law. Ammons taught administrative law, legislation, mass communications law, and women and the law. From 2003 to 2006, she served as the associate dean of Cleveland-Marshall. In 2006, Ammons became the seventh dean of the Widener University School of Law.

== Education ==
Ammons received her B.A. degree in English from Oakwood University in 1974. She then received her M.A. degree in communications from Ohio State University in 1980, and her J.D. degree from Ohio State University Moritz College of Law in 1987.

== Controversy ==
Some would say Ammons left Widener with a cloud over her head following her sanction of Professor Lawrence Connell who used Ammons in his class hypotheticals. Ammons sanctioned Connell calling him a "racist" and a "sexist" and requiring him to undergo a psychological evaluation before being allowed to return to school. A faculty hearing panel subsequently cleared Connell to return. Ammons insisted Connell complete the psychological evaluation and not return to school until he apologized to the students who brought the original complaint and was cleared by professionals to return to work. Widener accepted Ammons's suggestions in their entirety.

Connell subsequently sued Widener and settled with the school for an undisclosed amount in 2012.

The fallout caused a major donor to resign from the Board of Overseers and caused alumni donations to dip the following year. Ammons took a sabbatical during Fall 2014 and announced she would step down at the end of the 2014 school year.

She also sparked controversy when Governor Jack Markell commissioned her to perform an independent review in the child rape case of former Lewes-area pediatrician Earl Bradley. Part of her review included a suggestion of civil commitments of sexually violent predators who "cannot be successfully prosecuted." She later said she did not support the idea.

Also during her tenure as dean, eight students sued Widener, claiming the school's statistics about the employment of graduates were misleading, which the school denied. The class failed to be certified in 2015 and some students have reportedly begun individual suits.

Academic offices
Preceded by	Widener University School of Law; 2006-2014	Succeeded by Robyn L. Meadows
