= Amy Salerno =

American politician

Member of the Ohio House of Representatives from the 23rd district
- In office January 3, 1995 – December 31, 2002
- Preceded by: Mike Stinziano
- Succeeded by: Dan Stewart

Personal details
- Born: October 17, 1956 (age 69)
- Party: Republican
- Education: Youngstown State, B.A. Ohio State, J.D.

Amy Salerno (born October 17, 1956) is a former Republican member of the Ohio House of Representatives from 1995 through 2002. Her district consisted of a portion of Franklin County, Ohio. She was succeeded by Dan Stewart. Salerno was a judge in the Franklin County Municipal Court in Columbus, Ohio from 2005 until she was defeated for re-election by a wide margin by Jessica D’Varga on November 5, 2019.

== Life and career ==
Salerno grew up in Boardman Township near Youngstown, Ohio, and graduated from Boardman High School. She graduated with a BA from Youngstown State University in 1979 and a JD from the Moritz College of Law at Ohio State University in 1982.

Salerno's political career began in 1993, when she was recruited by the Franklin County Republican Party to run for an at-large seat on the Columbus City Council. She narrowly lost that race. The next year, she successfully unseated 22-year Democratic incumbent Mike Stinziano to represent the 23rd District in the Ohio House of Representatives.

In the House, Salerno sponsored a bill establishing the crime of homicide by child abuse, with the same statutory penalty as murder. This was inspired by the 1996 killing of 3-year-old P.J. Bourgeois. His parents were charged with involuntary manslaughter instead of murder and each spent less than four years in prison after early probation. The bill was signed into law by Governor Bob Taft and served as a model for similar legislation around the US. Salerno appeared on the October 25, 2000 episode of The Oprah Winfrey Show to discuss the Bourgeois case and her proposed legislation.

Salerno left the House in 2002 because she was term-limited. After she lost the election for Franklin County clerk of courts, Governor Taft appointed her to the Franklin County Municipal Court. During Salerno's tenure, she was ranked as the worst judge in the Columbus Bar Association survey in 2007, 2009, 2011, and 2013.

== Controversies ==
=== Antonio Henton ===
She was accused of "grandstanding" by the Columbus Dispatch for lecturing Ohio State football player Antonio Henton during his 2007 arraignment for solicitation.

=== Jury scolding ===
In August 2013, following a "not guilty" verdict after an assault trial in her courtroom, Salerno lectured the jury for delivering what she thought was the incorrect verdict, and is reported to have said that she would be able to convict the defendant because he had another criminal case pending in her courtroom. After jurors complained, Administrative Judge James E. Green asked Salerno to recuse herself from the other case involving the defendant and said that she may face disciplinary action.

On March 11, 2015, the Supreme Court of Ohio approved a consent-to-discipline agreement between Salerno and the Ohio State Bar Association. As part of the settlement, all parties agreed that Salerno violated Ohio Code of Judicial Conduct Rule 1.2, which requires a judge to respect and comply with the law and to act at all times in a manner that promotes public confidence in the integrity and impartiality of the judiciary, and Rule 2.8(c) which prohibits a judge from commending or criticizing jurors for their verdict other than in a court order or opinion in a proceeding. The court publicly reprimanded Salerno for the violations and ordered her to pay all costs related to the investigation.

== Personal life ==
Amy Salerno has two daughters. She is a stage two breast cancer survivor.
