= John Lowe (executive) =

- Education: Illinois, B.A. Ohio State, J.D.

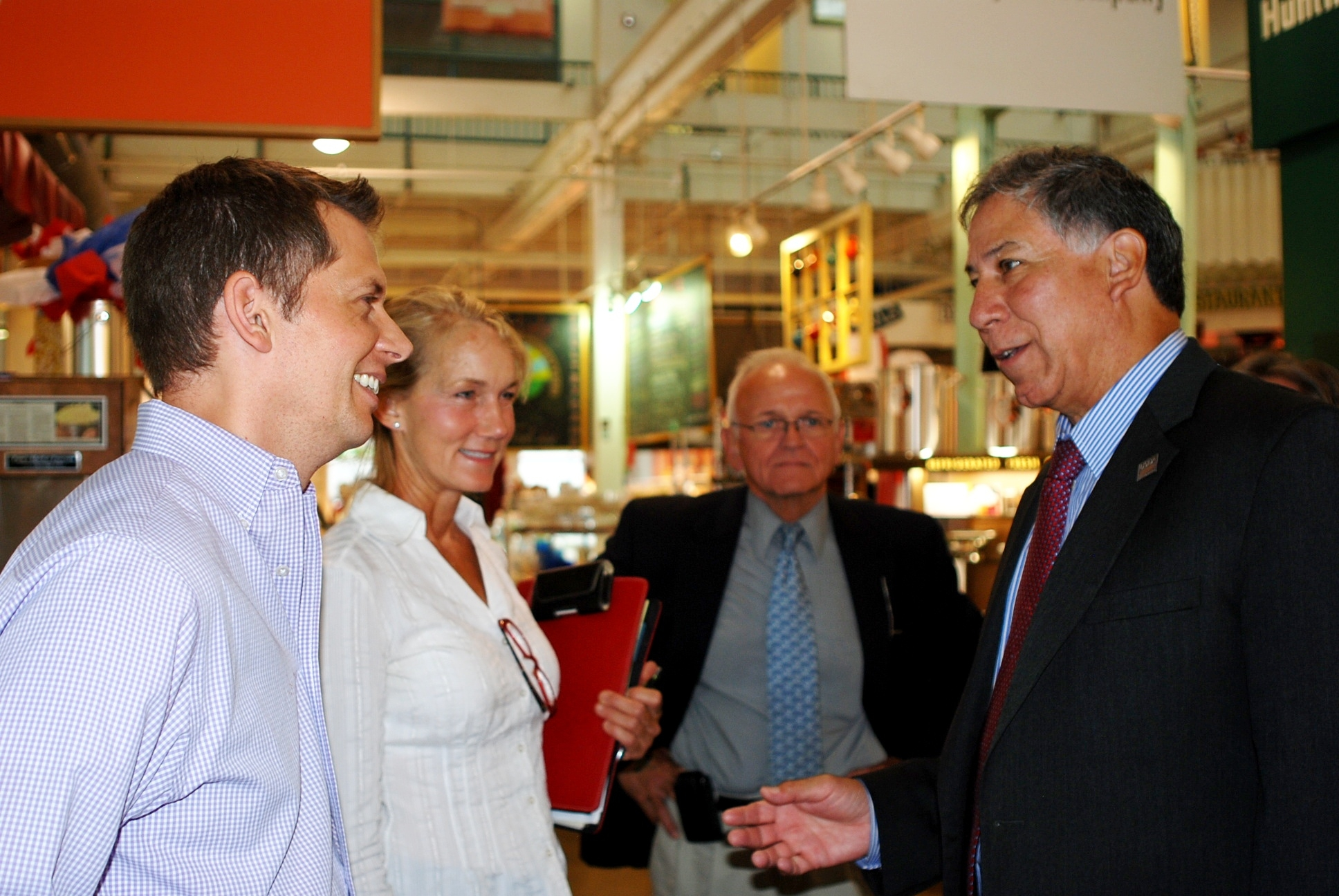
MRP Under Secretary Edward Avalos at the Ohio North Market with John Lowe, CEO of Jeni's Splendid Ice Cream (far left); Val Jorgensen, local producer; and Steve Maurer, Ohio State Executive Director for the Farm Service Agency.

John Lowe is a former CEO of Jeni's Splendid Ice Creams and, as of 2014, Eat Well Distribution. He retired from Jeni's Splendid in 2022.

== Career ==
Lowe began his career at the law firm of Kegler Brown Hill & Ritter in Columbus, Ohio from 1996 to 2005. He then worked in the legal department at GE Aviation from 2005 to 2009. In 2009, Jeni Britton Bauer appointed Lowe of Jeni's Splendid Ice Creams. During his tenure as CEO, Jeni's has grown to 20 scoop shops and is carried by more than 1,800 retailers nationwide.

== Education ==
Lowe received a bachelor's degree in political science from University of Illinois at Urbana–Champaign in 1995. He then received a law degree from Ohio State University Moritz College of Law in 1998.
