= Michael Stinziano =

American politician

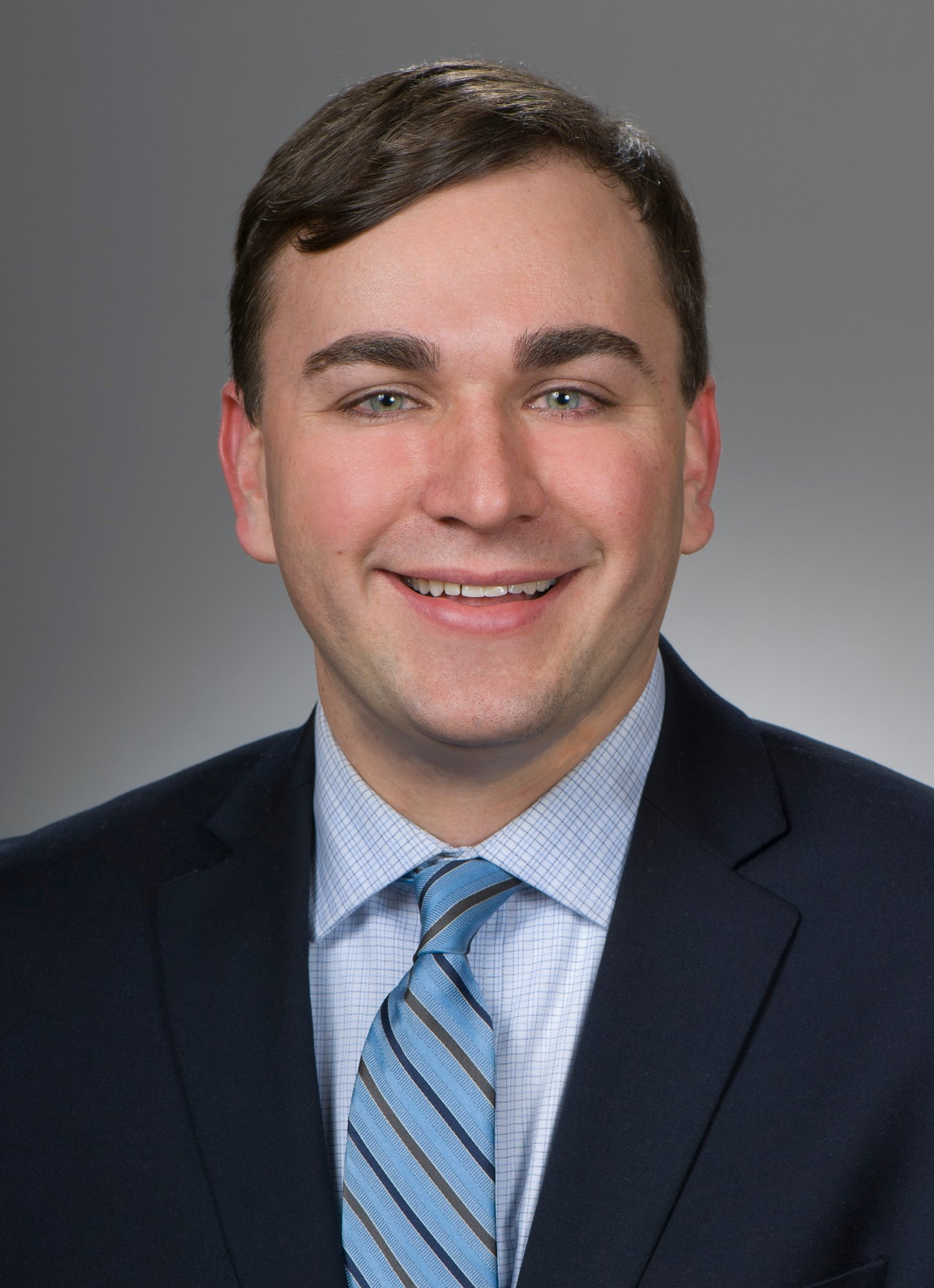

Auditor of Franklin County
- Incumbent
- Assumed office March 11, 2019
- Preceded by: Clarence Mingo

Member of Columbus City Council for Seat 1
- In office January 4, 2016 – February 22, 2019 Serving with Zachary Klein, Elizabeth C. Brown, Jaiza Page
- Preceded by: Francine C. "Fran" Ryan; Andrew J. Ginther
- Succeeded by: Rob Dorans

Member of the Ohio House of Representatives from the 18th district
- In office January 1, 2013 – January 1, 2016
- Preceded by: Mike Dovilla
- Succeeded by: Kristin Boggs

Member of the Ohio House of Representatives from the 25th district
- In office January 3, 2011 – January 1, 2013
- Preceded by: Dan Stewart
- Succeeded by: Kevin Boyce

Personal details
- Born: November 23, 1979 (age 46) Columbus, Ohio, U.S.
- Party: Democratic
- Relations: Mike Stinziano (father)
- Education: University of Richmond (BA); George Washington University (MPA); Ohio State University (JD)
- Website: Website

Michael Stinziano Jr. (born November 23, 1979) is an American politician serving as the auditor of Franklin County, Ohio. He took office on March 11, 2019, after winning the election in November 2018. Stinziano previously a member of the Columbus City Council from 2016 to 2019 and the Ohio House of Representatives from 2013 to 2016.

== Early life and education ==
Michael Stinziano was born November 23, 1979, at Mount Carmel West Hospital in Franklinton and grew up in the Short North and University District communities. His father, Mike Stinziano, was a member of the Ohio House of Representatives for 22 years. Following his graduation from high school in Columbus, Stinziano earned a bachelor's degree from the University of Richmond and master's degree in public administration from George Washington University. After returning to Columbus, he earned a Juris Doctor from the Ohio State University Moritz College of Law.

== Career ==
=== Early career ===
His prior experience includes work as the director of the Franklin County Board of Elections, as an assistant to the general counsel for Ohio Secretary of State Jennifer Brunner, as a law clerk for the Ohio House Democratic Caucus, as a legal extern for the Supreme Court of Ohio, as a research assistant for two members of the British Parliament, and as a congressional intern in Washington, D.C.

=== Ohio House of Representatives ===
With incumbent Representative Dan Stewart unable to seek another term due to term limits, Stinziano, whose father, Mike Stinziano had held the same seat for two decades, entered the race. Stinziano faced a primary challenge in John Sowers, a local business owner, but won by about 3,200 votes. Originally, Stinziano was going to face Republican Scott Hubbard in the general election, however, Hubbard dropped out, leaving Stinziano with a clear path to the Statehouse. On January 3, 2011, Stinziano was sworn into his first term. The 18th house district includes the communities of Bexley, Franklinton, German Village, Grandview Heights, the Hilltop, Olde Towne East, Ohio State University and Italian Village.

Stinziano won a second term in 2012 over Republican Bill Colgan with 73.39% of the electorate, and a third in 2014 with 74% of the vote.

In November 2018 election for Franklin County auditor, he successfully ousted Clarence Mingo, a Republican.

=== Sponsored legislation and policy positions ===
As county auditor, Stinziano implemented a six-week paid parental and caregiver leave policy. Stinziano streamlined the process for farmers impacted by inclement weather to still receive their tax breaks under the Current Agricultural Use Value (CAUV) program. Tax breaks were also distributed to residents and businesses that suffered property value reductions due to inclement weather. Stinziano developed a "Real Estate Sales Dashboard" that shows recent home sales on a GIS map. The Dashboard can show the month's total sales amount, median sales price, and number of sales by municipality, school district, or area commission. In May 2019, Stinziano inspected the gas pumps in Franklin County to ensure there were no credit card skimming devices, no such devices were found. The deadline to license a dog in Franklin County was extended to March 31, giving residents more time and flexibility to license their dogs. He created an electronic version of the real estate title form DTE 100 and made the auditor's office website available in multiple languages to make the services provided by the office more accessible.

As a state representative he piloted several pieces of legislation stemming directly from constituent ideas presented at his weekly community hours.

When a constituent shared the news of a student-athlete who ended up in a wheelchair after returning to play too soon after suffering a concussion, Stinziano sponsored legislation to prevent sports-related head injuries along with Representative Sean O'Brien. House Bill 143 established return-to-play standards after an athlete exhibits signs and symptoms of a concussion and has been recognized as national model legislation among the more than 25 other states that have adopted similar laws to help protect our young athletes from serious injury with a return-to-play law.

Other ideas suggested by constituents that are now Ohio law include: HB 117 Operation of Captive Insurance Companies in Ohio; HB 126 Living Will Changes; HB 170 Naloxone; HB 265 Accessible Language in ORC and Signage; HB 365 Tax Overpayment Notification; HB 344 Create Ohio Statehouse License Plate; and HB 448 Infant Mortality Education & Prevention.

Stinziano has supported a statewide process for dealing with and counting provisional ballots during elections, and sponsored legislation to create online voter registration for Ohioans.

== Election history ==
Ohio House 18th District: 2010 to 2014
Year	Democrat	Votes	Pct	Republican	Votes	Pct
2014	Michael Stinziano	16,125	74.46%	Rob Sharrah	5,532	25.54%
2012	Michael Stinziano	33,380	73.39%	William Colgan	12,101	26.61
2010	Michael Stinziano	20,144	100.00%			

Ohio House of Representatives
Preceded by Dan Stewart	Member of the Ohio House of Representatives from the 25th district 2011–2013	Succeeded by Kevin Boyce
Preceded by Mike Dovilla	Member of the Ohio House of Representatives from the 18th district 2013–2016	Succeeded by Kristin Boggs
