= Thomas F. Patton (executive) =

- Born: December 6, 1903; Cleveland, Ohio, United States
- Died: January 2, 2001 (aged 97)
- Education: Ohio State B.A. Ohio State, J.D.
- Years active: 1956-1971
- Employer: Republic Steel
- Known for: CEO of Republic Steel
- Title: President, Chairman, and Chief Executive Officer

Thomas F. Patton (1903-2001) was an American business executive who was the president, chairman and chief executive officer of Republic Steel (now the Mittal Steel Company).

== Early life and education ==
Patton was born in Cleveland, Ohio in 1903. He received his bachelor's degree from Ohio State University in 1924. He then received his Juris Doctor degree from Ohio State University Moritz College of Law in 1926.

== Career ==
Patton began his career working in the legal department of the Union Trust Company and then joined the law firm of Andrews & Belden in Cleveland, Ohio, where in 1930 he helped work out the complicated merger of four companies into Republic Steel. In 1936, Republic hired Patton to set up an internal legal department. He joined the company’s board in 1943 and a year later was named vice president. He became president in 1956 and then chairman and chief executive of Republic Steel until his retirement in 1971. Patton also served as chairman of the American Iron and Steel Institute, where he gave Congressional testimony, which included warnings in the 1960s that steel imports would damage the American steel industry.

In the early 1950s, Patton helped to establish the Cleveland Development Foundation, which sought to redevelop the city’s downtown area and build new housing for the poor. He served on the board of Ohio State University and as a trustee of John Carroll University. In 1963, he served as state chairman of a successful campaign to authorize a $250 million bond issue for the establishment of branches of public universities throughout Ohio.
