= James F. Bell (judge) =

American judge

James Finley Bell, Jr.

Associate Justice of the Ohio Supreme Court
- In office January 1, 1955 – October 8, 1962
- Preceded by: Henry A. Middleton
- Succeeded by: Lynn B. Griffith

Personal details
- Born: January 12, 1915 Madison County, Ohio
- Died: September 23, 2005 (aged 90) Bradenton, Florida
- Party: Democratic
- Spouses: Charlotte Engard; Gloria Ingles Daubenspeck Smith
- Children: two
- Education: DePauw University; Ohio State University Law School

James Finley Bell, Jr. (1915–2005) was a Democratic lawyer from Ohio. He was a local judge, and was elected twice to the Ohio Supreme Court. He wrote the majority opinion of the court affirming the conviction of Sam Sheppard in the murder of his wife, which was later overturned by the United States Supreme Court.

Bell was born in Madison County, Ohio on January 12, 1915, the son of James F. Bell, Sr. and Rowena Moore Bell. He graduated from DePauw University in 1936 and from the Ohio State University Law School. He was admitted to the Ohio bar in 1939, and began a private practice in London, Ohio. He was a special agent of the Federal Bureau of Investigation from 1942 to 1945, then returned to private practice in London.

Bell's father was judge of the Madison County Court of Common Pleas. Bell, Sr. died in 1947, and Bell, Jr. was appointed to replace him. He won the unexpired portion of his father's term in 1948, and a full six-year term in 1950. In 1954 he was elected to a six-year term on the Ohio Supreme Court. He wrote the majority opinion in 1956 in State of Ohio vs. Sheppard which affirmed the guilty verdict of doctor Sam Sheppard in the murder of his wife, Marilyn. The United States Supreme Court overturned the verdict in 1965, and ordered a new trial. In 1966, a jury acquitted Sheppard.

In 1960, Bell won a second six-year term on the court. He resigned effective October 8, 1962, and joined the Columbus, Ohio firm Power, Griffith, Jones and Bell. In 1971, Bell and first wife, Charlotte Engard Bell, moved to Holmes Beach, Florida, where he was general counsel of General Telephone Company of Florida. The couple divorced, and Bell married Gloria Ingles Daubenspeck Smith. He retired from the telephone company in 1980 and formed an arbitration firm.

Bell died at home in Bradenton, Florida on September 23, 2005. He and his first wife had two children.
