= TDIndustries =

American construction and technology corporation

TDIndustries headquarters at 13850 Diplomat Drive

TDIndustries, founded in 1946, is an American construction and technology corporation that provides commercial and industrial services such as air conditioning, electrical, and plumbing systems primarily through general contractors. They also provide process equipment installation for customers, operations, maintenance and repair of mechanical and electrical systems, and provide emergency service. The company is based in Dallas, Texas with offices in Fort Worth, Austin, Houston, San Antonio, Phoenix and Denver.

In 2013 the company was included in Fortune magazine's list of the "100 Best Places to Work in America". It has been on the list since it was first published in 1998, and in 2005 was included in Fortune's "100 Best Hall of Fame," a list of 22 companies in the U.S. who have appeared on the list every year. It has over 3,000 employees and an annual revenue of $475 million.

== History ==
=== Founding and early years ===
Founded as Texas Distributors, Inc., the name TDIndustries was coined in the early 1980s.

The first board of directors meeting of Texas Distributors, Inc. was recorded on February 5, 1946 with Jack Lowe Sr., his mother, Florence Lowe, and her sister, Julia Lee Greer, in attendance. The three of them, according to the minutes, “subscribe for and agree to take” two hundred shares of stock in the company with Greer and Jack Lowe each accepting ninety-nine shares and Florence Lowe two shares, all at a face value of one hundred dollars.

Greer, who ran an auto parts business, co-signed the bank loan that provided twenty thousand dollars in start-up capital. She also lent the new company working space for a time in her building at 1820 Canton. The company charter was filed immediately with the Secretary of State's office, enabling them to meet again at 2 pm the next day at Greer's building for the “first meeting of the incorporators and stockholders and subscribers.”

At that point ten thousand dollars cash was advanced to the corporation and the three stockholders elected themselves directors for a year; they held a board of directors’ meeting called for an hour later at which they adopted by-laws, approved a stock form and made themselves the company's first officers. By a unanimous vote of three, Lowe became both chairman of the board and president of the company. Mrs. Lowe was elected vice president and Greer secretary-treasurer.

Texas Distributors concentrated on repair work early on—there was nothing to distribute at the time because Texas Distributors did not yet have a distribution agreement with a manufacturer and because none of the manufacturers had changed over from war production. TD's first employees repaired or installed various heating and cooling systems, including refrigerators, ice cream freezers, water fountains, and attic fans.

In the fall of 1946, the second half of the twenty thousand dollars arranged at its foundation was advanced to the company, and construction was begun on an eight thousand-square-foot building at 3914 Live Oak. The new facility had a large display window and a tower of glass bricks that, when lighted, was designed to make the company's name more noticeable at night. By spring, Texas Distributors had left Greer's automotive supply shop on Canton Street.

On December 12, 1946, the board established the Texas Distributors Retire Plan which stipulated that the company would contribute to a retirement fund an amount equal to five percent of the employee's monthly salary. In a second action, Lowe, Fred Addison, Greer, and Jim Pavelka were elected trustees of the Texas Distributors Profit Sharing Trust, which was based on six-months vesting, and the company promised to contribute annually an amount equal to twenty-five percent of its net pre-tax earnings. The money would be invested and credited to each employee based on the amount of his salary. One third of the annual trust contribution could be distributed at Christmas if requested. An employee could collect his accumulated funds after five years, but would forfeit them if he terminated before that time.

Before 1947 ended Texas Distributors had signed an agreement with the Worthington Corporation, to be a distributor of air conditioning equipment.

To raise working capital, Lowe offered to sell his employees nonvoting stock in the company which, at that point, only he, his officers, his aunt and his mother owned. A subsequent meeting of stockholders authorized issuance of an additional 217 shares of stock valued at one hundred dollars per share. The company agreed to loan its employees money to buy the stock on the understanding that they could repay the loans in installments subtracted from their paychecks.

Fifteen employees subscribed to 187 shares of stock, and friends of the company pledged to purchase the remaining thirty shares. The company's capital value was more than doubled.

Capital shortages were a recurring problem for Texas Distributors for most of the 1950s. In the company bought its first new service truck. They received a contract to provide service for all new Kelvinator equipment. TD also leased and serviced drinking fountains, and a system of painting refrigerators inexpensively was developed. The company later signed an agreement to repair Philco window air conditioning units and Worthington's commercial air conditioning equipment.

TD began to move into contracting. In 1949, General Electric offered TD its line of heating equipment, and the company began to have dealers and a small wholesale business.

The Worthington line had been a profitable arrangement, and in 1950 GE became increasingly dissatisfied with its North Texas distributor and offered its air conditioning line to Texas Distributors.

Worthington provided more income than GE would at the beginning, but the manufacturer expected its distributor to handle a certain volume of equipment, so doing business with GE meant doing more business than TD had ever done. To achieve those levels, it grew its wholesale inventory operation with a large dealer network in North Texas.

Dealers had to be either salesmen who could install and service equipment or servicemen who could sell. TD trained the new dealers in how to figure loads and draw layouts, bookkeeping and management.

In 1952, Texas Distributors and General Electric put together a store cooler and a GE furnace as a year-round air-conditioning system for the home. This unit went into 210 new three-bedroom homes in the East Ridge Park development. At the time, GE didn't have a product designed specifically for homes, and when other companies came out with one, the manufacturer and its distributors suffered. Then the resident product that finally arrived several years later proved unsuitable, and production units failed regularly.

A friendship between Trammell Crow and Lowe began in 1948, when Texas Distributors installed the air conditioning in several Crow buildings on Cole Avenue.

=== Equity plan ===
TD's wholesale business grew slowly during the mid-1950s. Except for a few short-term bank loans, Texas Distributors had depended on profits to supply the capital necessary for growth. Revenues had increased, but net income had fallen. General Electric opened a new manufacturing plan in Tyler, Texas, and TD was expected to be the recipient of much of the equipment produced there.

Texas Distributors obtained capital through a program called the General Electric Equity Finance Plan by which the manufacturer offered to finance the growth of its distributors, in return for equity in Texas Distributors. The manufacturer presented Texas Distributors with two hundred thousand dollars in working capital, half of which was a loan to TD, and the other half of which was one hundred thousand dollars in Texas Distributors preferred stock sold to GE, with TD paying the dividends on that stock until they could accumulate enough money to buy it back.

After terms had been agreed upon but before the papers were signed, Lowe showed the plan to his employees. Most of them owned stock, but only the company's officers held voting stock, and they already had approved the equity plan.

=== Tempo Mechanical ===
Lincoln Properties ran a subsidiary called RCLP—Rockefeller, Crow, Lyle and Pogue—that did all of its mechanical work. Trammell wanted TD to take over all of the air conditioning, plumbing, and electrical in their apartment business. TD agreed to the air conditioning and later plumbing. The plumbers, heat and air crews formed a separate company in 1967 that functioned as a franchised Texas Distributors dealer named Tempo Air Conditioning, Inc. In 1978, Tempo was acquired as a full division of Texas Distributors.

== Awards and recognition ==
- One of the 100 Best Companies To Work For In America as published by Fortune magazine. TDIndustries has been on this list annually since it has been published, and is one of 15 companies included in Fortune Magazine's "100 Best Companies to Work For Hall of Fame".
- Top 100 Training Organizations ‚ Training magazine‚ 2001, 2002, 2003 and 2004
- National Construction Safety Excellence Award‚ Associated General Contractors‚ 2000
- Award for Principle-Centered Leadership‚ Ernst & Young National Entrepreneur of the Year recognition of Jack Lowe‚ 2000
- Top 25 Newsmakers‚ Engineering News-Record recognition of Ben Houston‚ 2000
