= Olin H. Travis =

Texan artist (1888–1975)

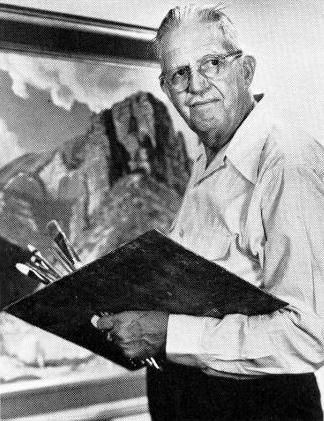
- Born: November 15, 1888; Dallas, Texas
- Died: December 4, 1974 (aged 86); Dallas, Texas
- Education: Vivian Louise Aunspaugh Frank Reaugh
- Alma mater: School of the Art Institute of Chicago
- Known for: Co-founding Dallas Art Institute
- Spouse: Katheryne Hail Travis (m.1916) Josephine Oliver (m.1935)
- Parents: Olin Few Travis (father); Eulalia Moncrief Travis (mother)
- Website: olinhtravis.com

Olin Herman Travis (1888–1975) was an American painter and arts educator active for much of the 20th century. He spent most of his life working in Texas, though he and his first wife Kathryne Hail Travis routinely traveled to Arkansas. In addition to his paintings, Travis is largely known for several public murals in Dallas and for working with Kathryne to co-found the Dallas Art Institute (DAI) – the first major art institution in the south to offer artistic instruction in a variety of fields.

== Personal life ==
Olin H. Travis was born on November 15, 1888, in Dallas, Texas, the second of six children born to Olin Few Travis and Eulalia Moncrief Travis. He grew up with some familiarity with the arts as his father worked as a printer, and his next-door neighbor was noted sculptor Clyde Giltner Chandler. She introduced him to painter Stephen Seymour Thomas and he began taking art classes soon after.

In 1916, Olin married fellow artist and one of his former students, Kathryne Hail, in Ozark, Arkansas. After their wedding, the pair spent several years traveling and sketching in different parts of the country, notably around Colorado, Florida, Missouri, Mexico, the Ozark Mountains, and the area surrounding the Great Lakes. Olin and Kathryne had one son and one daughter together before getting a divorce in 1934, an event highly publicized in local newspapers.

In 1935, Travis married his second wife Josephine Oliver, an accomplished painter and apprentice to Frank Reaugh. The pair had met two years prior, on her eighth trip to the area with Reaugh to sketch landmarks like Big Bend, Double Mountains, and Blanco Canyon. After their wedding, Josephine turned her attention to the violin – playing with both the San Antonio Symphony Orchestra and the Dallas Symphony Orchestra until her retirement in the 1970s following Olin's death.

Olin H. Travis continued making and exhibiting art until his death on December 4, 1975, and his work has been included in numerous exhibitions in the decades since. His wife, Josephine Oliver Travis, died in 1991 at age 83.

== Education ==
Olin Travis was encouraged to pursue his interest in art by his high school art teacher, who arranged to him to receive additional instruction from local artists including Vivian Louise Aunspaugh and Frank Reaugh. He graduated from Bryan High School in 1906 and from Metropolitan Business College in Dallas two years later in 1908, before moving across the country to attend the School of the Art Institute of Chicago.

Travis began his art studies at the School of the Art Institute of Chicago in 1909. In 1913, he participated in demonstrations against the Armory Show, an exhibition of then-controversial new European and American artworks. The public response to the exhibition resulted in the first use of the phrase "avant-garde" to describe painting/sculpture, with Marcel Duchamp's Nude Descending a Staircase representing one of the more controversial works. This wasn't the only time Travis made the news for his opinions on art, with The Southern Review publishing one of his articles titled "A Complaint" in 1928.

While in Chicago, Travis studied under instructors like Kenyon Cox, Harry Walcott, and Joaquin Sorolla y Bastida before graduating with honors in 1914. He started his instructional career shortly after, becoming an associate instructor of art at SAIC soon after graduation.

== Career ==
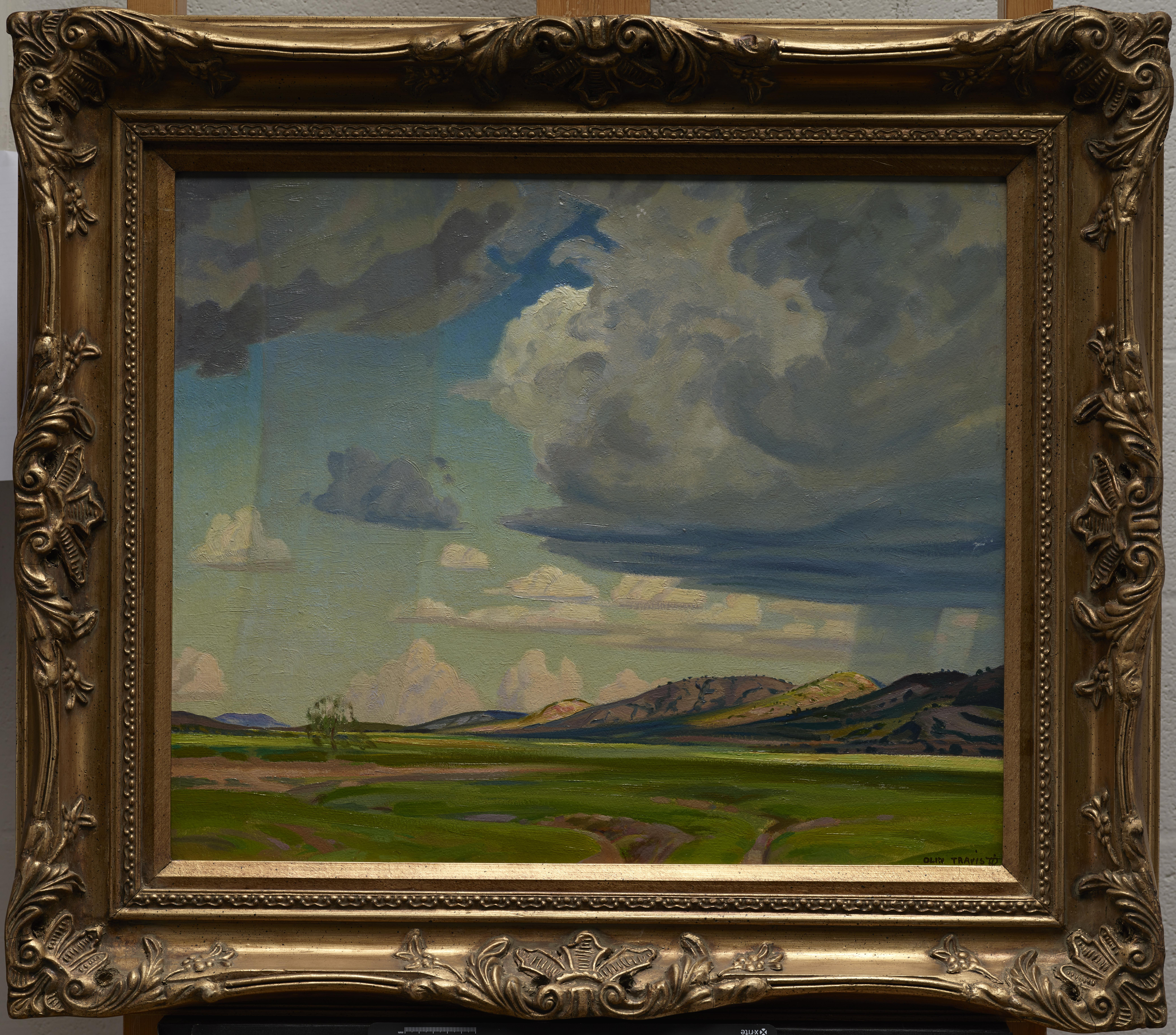
Cloud Study, oil-on-board, Dallas Museum of Art.

Travis taught at the School of the Art Institute of Chicago until he became the director of the newly founded Chicago Commercial Art School. He and his wife Kathryne worked in Chicago for several years before relocating to Dallas around 1923, opening a studio together when they arrived. Soon after moving to back to Texas, Travis began joining local arts groups, even painting scenery and sets for the local Little Theater of Dallas for several years. Throughout his life, many more groups would count Travis among their members, including Texas Fine Arts Association, Highland Park Art Association, American Artists Professional League, Dallas Art League, Lone Star Printmakers, and the American Federation of Arts.

Olin Travis was an early and prominent member of the Southern States Art League, a group assembled to "further art, its production, and its appreciation throughout the south." They were founded as a regional branch of the American Federation of Arts, and thus made the inclusion of southern artists in national exhibitions one of their primary goals – something that Travis benefited from greatly. Within a decade the group had grown to more than 600 members, with league artists working in every southern state.

=== Dallas Art Institute (1926–1945) ===
Upon their return to Dallas from the lively arts education scene in Chicago, Olin and his wife Kathryne founded the Dallas Art Institute on the second floor of a building on Main Street in Dallas. Their school was the first art school to offer instruction in a variety of art fields in the southern United States, and Olin served as director from 1926 until 1945. The initial selection of offerings included courses in painting, life drawing, sculpture, art history, costume design, illustration, composition, and commercial art.

During the summer of 1927, Olin and Kathryne opened the Travis Ozark Summer Art School near Ozark, Arkansas as an affiliate of the Dallas Art Institute. The school operated for several summers with approximately 50 students living and working in 15 cabins and a lodge. The Summer Art School was open to both DAI students and residents of Arkansas and neighboring southern states. It operated officially for 3 summers, though some records suggest they returned informally as late as 1935. A fire destroyed the Travis' home in the Ozarks that summer, destroying many of Olin's paintings and journals.

Olin Travis taught countless students over the years, most notably Everett Spruce, Florence McClung, Otis Dozier, Barney Delabano, James Brooks, and Charles Bowling. As director, Travis hired many people that he would eventually consider friends, to teach at DAI or work in administration. In addition to Kathryne Hail Travis, some of these artists included Jerry Bywaters, Alexander Hogue, Thomas M. Stell Jr., Howard Shoup, Margaret Scruggs-Carruth, and Allie Tennant.

Attendance at the Art Institute dropped dramatically during the Great Depression but picked up from 1931 to 1935, when Olin Travis hired several new professors. The new group taught special courses in outdoor sketching, watercolor, ceramics, and stage design. Travis also pushed for more exhibitions and lectures that involved the greater Dallas community, leading to the school expanding its degree options in 1934 to offer both three and four-year degree programs.

The institute moved several times over the years, first in 1931 to a location near the Southwest School of Fine Arts, then again in 1935 to a remodeled residence, and for a third time in 1938 to the Dallas Museum of Art. It remained there until 1941 when the Dallas Art Association decided to establish their own school within the museum, forcing them to move for the final time. Travis left his position at the school during the final move, and the Dallas Art Institute closed permanently in 1945.

After leaving DAI in 1941, Travis briefly worked as a guest instructor at the Hockaday School, the San Antonio Art Institute and Austin College before retiring. Travis began his prolific professional painting career with a focus on Southwestern landscapes before shifting to include a large collection of portraits in his broad portfolio. A small selection of notable Travis paintings includes:

- Shelling Peas, oil on canvas, undated, private collection.
- A Workman, oil on canvas, 1929, Center for the Advancement and Study of Early Texas Art (CASETA).
- Mayor of Hoover City, oil on canvas, 1932, Dallas Museum of Art.
- Country School House, watercolor on paper, 1939, Dallas Museum of Art.
- Castle Rock at Frying Pan River, oil on canvas, ca. 1940s, private collection.
- Lakeside, oil on canvas, 1955, private collection.

== Murals ==
East Texas Before Oil, Hall of State, Dallas, 1936.

Olin Travis painted several Works Progress Administration-funded public murals around Dallas during the Great Depression for the Federal Art Project. The WPA's Federal Art Project created more than 200,000 pieces of art, at least four of which were murals created by Olin. In addition to painting murals for several local businesses, Travis provided backdrops for Fair Park's Museum of Natural History and Wax museum and painted the mural at Love Field Terminal.

East Texas After Oil, Hall of State, Dallas, 1936.

In 1936, Travis completed a set of murals he had been hired to create at Fair Park's newly constructed Hall of State. The murals, titled East Texas Before Oil and East Texas After Oil, are featured above the doors on opposite ends of the East Texas room of the Hall of State. East Texas Before Oil is a bright mural that depicts a tall collection of pine trees being sawed down and loaded on rail while cotton heads the other way toward a cotton gin. The bustle of factories and towns can be seen on the horizon. Conversely, East Texas After Oil features a large dark cloud surrounded by beams of light, oil equipment, and trains, and a busy city skyline appears to rise from the horizon. In 2016 the city of Dallas recognized these murals on a list of "high value works by historically significant artists in urgent need of conservation," and renovations began two years later for both the Hall of State's interior and exterior at a cost of $14.6 million. A ribbon-cutting ceremony celebrating the subsequent success of the restoration was held on November 6, 2020.

List of known Travis murals:

- Food, J.L. Long Middle School, 1934.
- Man's Interdependence, J.L. Long Middle School.
- East Texas Before Oil, Hall of State, 1936.
- East Texas After Oil, Hall of State, 1936.

== Exhibitions ==
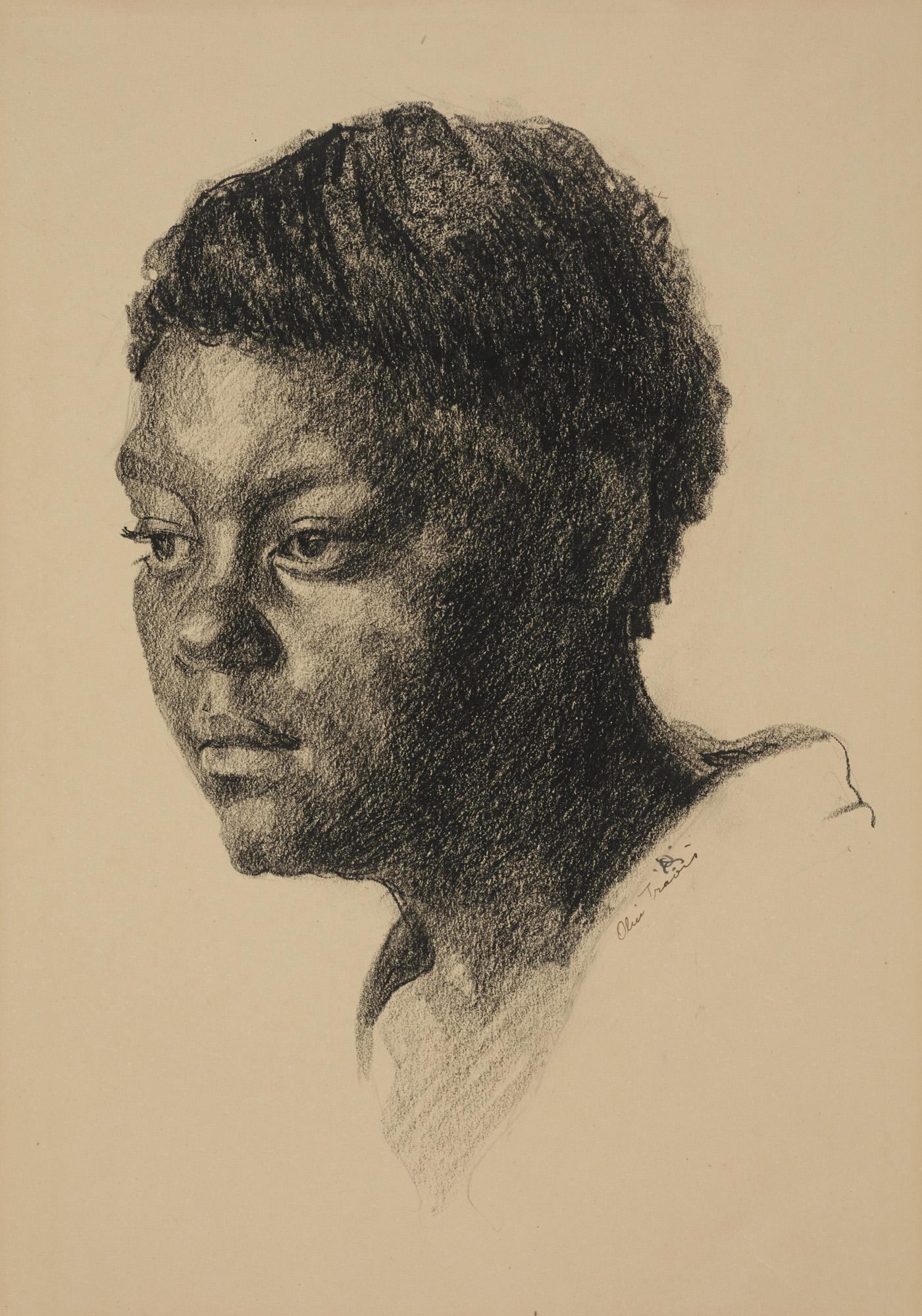
Head, lithograph, 1930, Dallas Museum of Art.

The list of exhibitions that Olin Travis participated in during his lifetime is extensive and only continues to grow as his work is still regularly celebrated nearly 50 years after his death. He was a prolific exhibitor, sharing his work in over 30 exhibitions at Dallas Museum of Arts alone during his lifetime. In 1938, Travis was one of 10 Dallas artists selected to share their work at the Golden Gate International Exposition the following year in San Francisco on Treasure Island, an artificial island that had been constructed for the occasion. He was invited to return the following year, commenting later that he considered his involvement in the international expositions a high point of his career.

Travis was a fervent anti-segregationist, an opinion that garnered a lot of attention in local newspapers following the Allied Annual Art Exhibition in Dallas in 1935. That year an African-American elementary school teacher named Mrs. Rezalia C. Thrash's watercolor painting Parrots was chosen for the exhibition, marking the first time in history that work by a Black woman was included in an integrated art exhibition in Texas. Although a significant event, the impact of Thrash's work on the local Black community was minimized by the fact that the four-week-long exhibition was only open to Black residents for a two-hour-span, after-hours, on one Wednesday night. Olin Travis sponsored her involvement in spite of local newspapers attempting to cause panic over her inclusion.

Olin held numerous solo shows throughout his career, and one of the first was titled Olin Travis: 30 Drawings of Imaginative Subjects and staged at Dallas Museum of Art from May–June 1932. He would headline several more exhibitions at the Dallas Art Institute and Dallas Museum of Art over the years, capped by his largest exhibition titled 50 Years of Painting in Dallas: A Retrospective Exhibition of Paintings and Drawings by Olin Travis in 1953. Notable posthumous exhibitions have included Seventy-Five Years of Art in Dallas: The History of the Dallas Art Association and the Dallas Museum of Fine Arts (1978), Lone Star Regionalism: The Dallas Nine and Their Circle 1928–1945 (1985), Olin Travis: Texas Master (1995), and Olin Travis: People, Places and Visions (2009).

== Collections ==
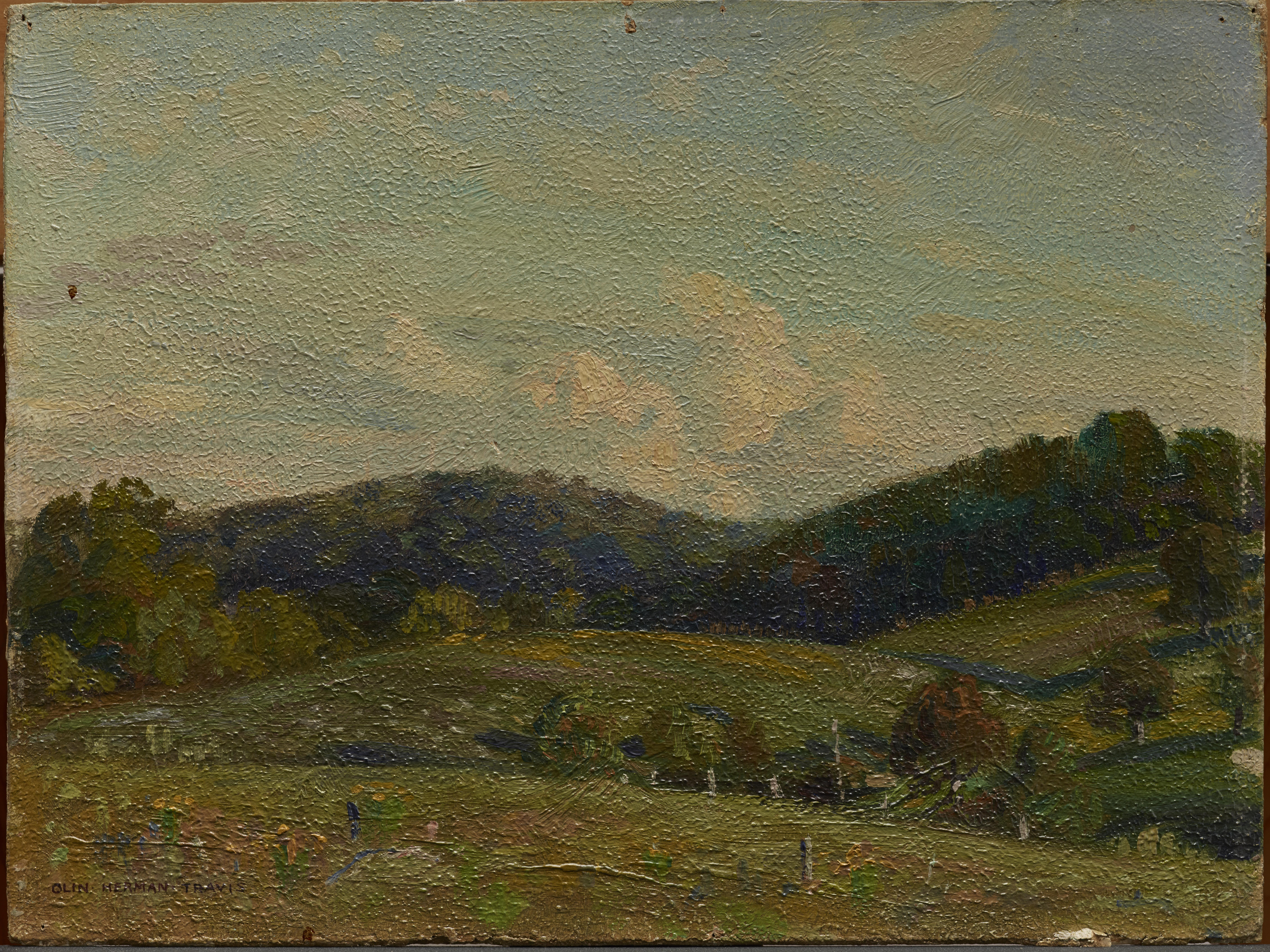
The Ozarks, oil-on-board, 1920–23, Dallas Museum of Art.

The largest collection of Olin H. Travis paintings can be found at Dallas Museum of Art, which holds 12 of his works in their permanent collection. His paintings and prints appear at auction semi-regularly in the southern United States with the majority of his work valued at less than $10,000, though it is not unheard of for Travis' landscape paintings to receive valuations of more than $50,000. In episode #2004 of the American television show Antiques Roadshow that aired in 2015, Travis' painting Ozark Hilltop (1947) was featured in the Little Rock segment and appraised at $10,000. In addition to numerous private collections, the following is a selection of public institutions that count his work among their collections:

- Dallas Museum of Art: Country Schoolhouse, 1940; The Ozarks, 1920–1923; Portrait of Fannie Kahn, 1930; Head, 1930; Mayor of Hoover City (Texas), 1932.
- National Gallery of Art: Noon Magic; String Quartette, 1940; Defense Plant Series #2: Time and Half, 1941–1943; The Visitor, 1945.
- Panhandle–Plains Historical Museum: Anita Gonzalez.
- Wake Forest University: Dog Mountain, Texas.
- University of New Orleans: House in the Valley.
- Blanton Museum of Art: Landscape; Near St. Mark's Glacier; Sheep Herder.
- McNay Art Museum: Defense Plant Series #1: Overtime, 1941–1943.
- El Paso Museum of Art: The Redbud; Reflections in The Concho.
- Center for the Advancement and Study of Early Texas Art (CASETA): A Workman, 1929; View From Our Window, 1935.
- Smithsonian Archives of American Art: Olin Travis Papers, 1928–1972.
- Meadows Museum of Art
- Elisabeth Ney Museum
