= Dallas Art Institute =

Former art school in Dallas, Texas

Coordinates: 32.7802°N 96.8014°W

- Type: Arts university
- Active: 1926–1946
- Founders: Olin H. Travis, Kathryne Hail Travis
- Director: Olin H. Travis 1926–1941
- Students: Approx. 200
- Location: Dallas, Texas

The Dallas Art Institute (1926–1946) was the first art school to offer instruction in a variety of fields in the southern United States. It was founded in 1926 by artists Olin H. Travis and Kathryne Hail Travis and operated until it was closed by the Dallas Museum of Art trustees in 1946.

== History ==
The Dallas Art Institute was founded in 1926 in downtown Dallas, Texas. The founders, artists Olin Travis and his wife Kathryne Hail Travis, had just returned to Olin's hometown of Dallas after receiving arts educations at the School of the Art Institute of Chicago. Inspired by what they learned there, they were eager to encourage the local art scene by founding the first institution to offer a variety of arts courses in the south. Travis served as director of the Art Institute from its founding in 1926 until 1941.

In 1930, the Dallas Art Institute secured non-profit status in moving to the grounds of the Civic Federation of Dallas, and thus needed to organize a board of trustees to govern the school. According to the terms of their charter the number of trustees must never exceed 20 or drop below 10, with the inaugural board consisting of 13 people, including noted illustrator Margaret Scruggs-Carruth. At this time, architect Thomas D. Broad was chosen to act as the school's first executive director to facilitate communications between the board and the Art Institute.

Though it began on the second floor of a building on main street, the Dallas Art Institute would move several times before its closure in 1946. Their most influential location was at the Civic Federation of Dallas on Maple Avenue, a move the institute made in 1931. Their new building on the corner of Alice Street and Maple Avenue placed them between Southwest School of Fine Arts and the Klepper Sketch Club, right in the center of an arts colony downtown. The local Dallas Artists' League began meeting weekly on Alice Street during the Great Depression, advertising "cheap meals for depression-stricken artists" when job opportunities for local artists became virtually nonexistent. In 1932, in coordination with other businesses, artists, and organizations nearby, the Art Institute participated in the first Alice Street Arts Carnival. Continuing until the start of World War II, the Alice Street Art Carnivals provided more than 70 local artists (and DAI students) with a venue to sell their work to the public for never more than $5.

Following a surge in enrollment in 1935, the school needed larger facilities and moved again, this time to a residence remodeled for the purpose on McKinley Avenue. The school made its third move in 1938, this time to the school wing of a brand new building on the campus of the Dallas Museum of Art. They operated here for three years, until the museum's board of trustees voted to cancel the Art Institute's contract in 1941, in favor of founding their own art school. The Dallas Art Institute was thus forced to move a fourth and final time, to a building several blocks from their first location on Main Street. It was during this move that Olin Travis left the school he had founded to work elsewhere, with the Dallas Art Institute closing for the final time five years later in 1946.

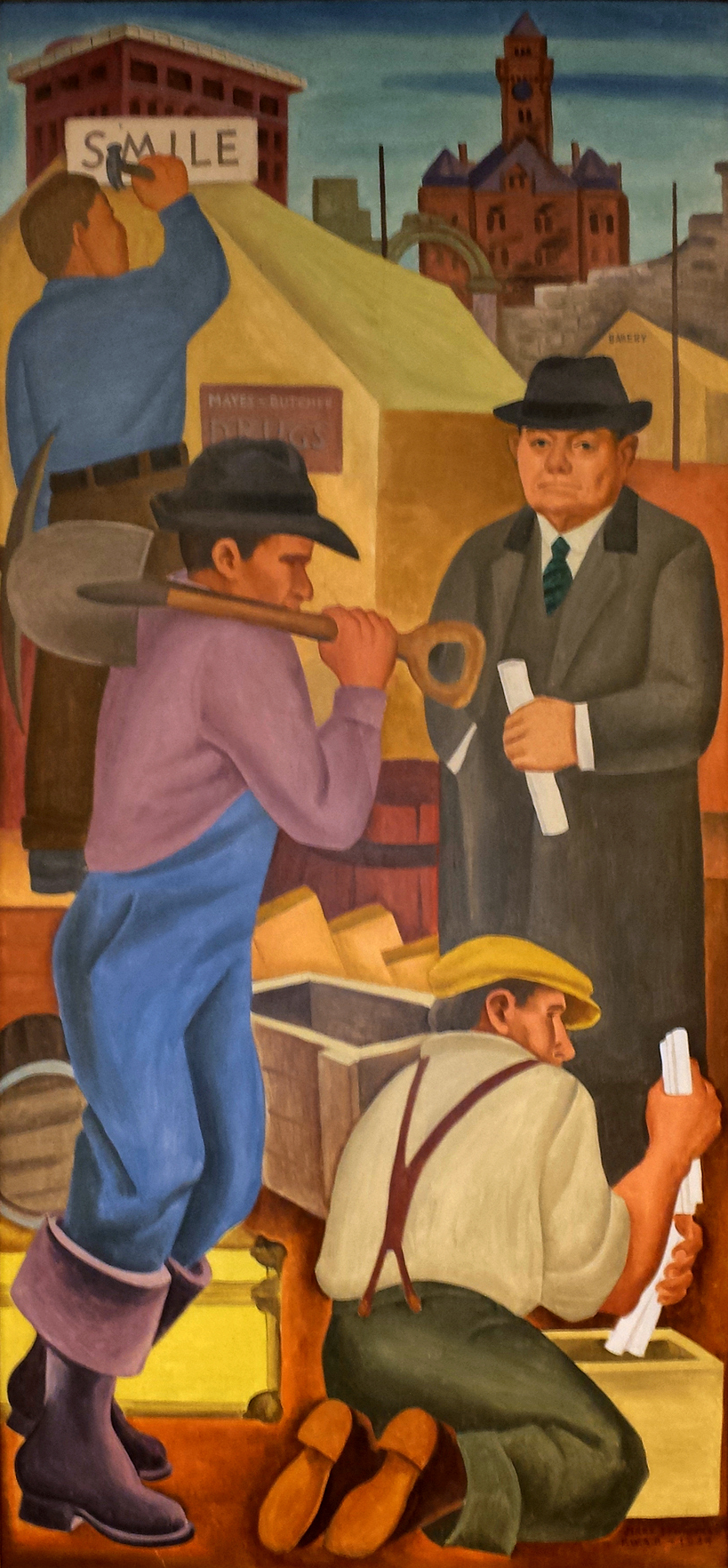
Rebuilding Paris, mural, Jerry Bywaters, Paris, Texas, 1934.

== Course offerings ==
At its inception in 1926, the Dallas Art Institute offered courses in painting (landscape, still life, and portraiture), life drawing, sculpture, art history, costume design, illustration, composition, fashion, and commercial art. The school was divided into several departments: commercial art led by Charles McCann, costume design led by Howard Shoup, general theory, history, and Saturday courses led by Leona McGill, etching and drawing led by Reveau Bassett, and painting led by Kathryne and Olin Travis.

The school operated with 8 faculty members and a steady 200 students for several years until enrollment numbers dropped dramatically during the Great Depression. Attendance picked up again in 1931 when a fresh group of artists was hired to teach an additional selection of courses, including Allie Tennant, Alexandre Hogue, Thomas M. Stell Jr., and former student Jerry Bywaters. The expanded course selection included offerings like outdoor sketching, watercolor, stage design, and ceramics. They also began several art lecture series that were open to the greater Dallas community and increased the number of exhibition opportunities available to students in hopes of expanding the public's knowledge and appreciation of art. Their efforts were successful, as the school was able to expand in 1934 to offer both a three-year certification option and a four-year diploma program.

== Travis Ozark Summer Art School ==
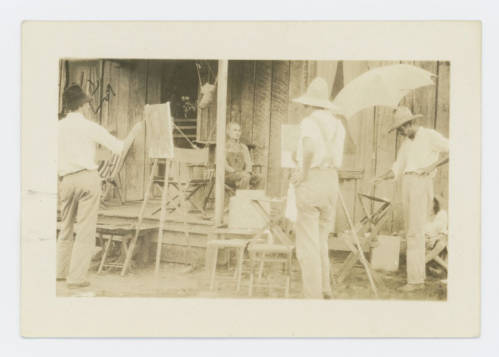
Students painting at Travis Ozark Summer Art School, image from Southern Methodist University

In 1927, the Travises opened the Travis Ozark Summer Art School as an affiliate of DAI in Franklin County near Ozark, Arkansas (Kathryne's hometown) to offer summer classes in the mountains. For several summers, a handful of faculty and approximately 50 students spent the months of June and July living and working in the school's 15 crudely furnished cabins. Before it was rented by the Travises, the property had housed a long-abandoned sawmill, so they were able to secure the land for a very inexpensive rate.

Holding summer school in the Ozarks was a prime choice for landscape painters, as the property was surrounded on all sides by miles of government forest preserve. It was during a trip to the summer art school that Olin H. Travis was introduced to a young Everett Spruce. He was encouraged to share his sketchbook with the director, who responded by immediately offering him a scholarship to the Dallas Art Institute. Spruce is now regarded as one of the most influential artists to emerge from the Dallas Art Institute, best known for his landscape paintings of Texas and the Ozarks.

The Summer Art School was open to both DAI students and residents of Arkansas and neighboring southern states, operating officially for 3 summers until 1930 when Kathryne left the DAI. Some records suggest that members of the faculty returned to hold classes informally as late as 1935, when a fire destroyed many of Olin Travis' paintings as well as the Travis' summer home in the Ozarks.

== Notable faculty ==
Tejas Warrior, Allie Tennant, 1936, Hall of State.

- Olin H. Travis (1888–1975)
- Kathryne Hail Travis (1894–1972)
- Allie Tennant (1892–1971)
- Reveau Bassett (1897–1981)
- Alexandre Hogue (1898–1994)
- Thomas M. Stell Jr. (1898–1981)
- Howard Shoup (1903–1987)
- Jerry Bywaters (1906–1989)
- Martha Simkins (1866–1969)

== Notable students ==
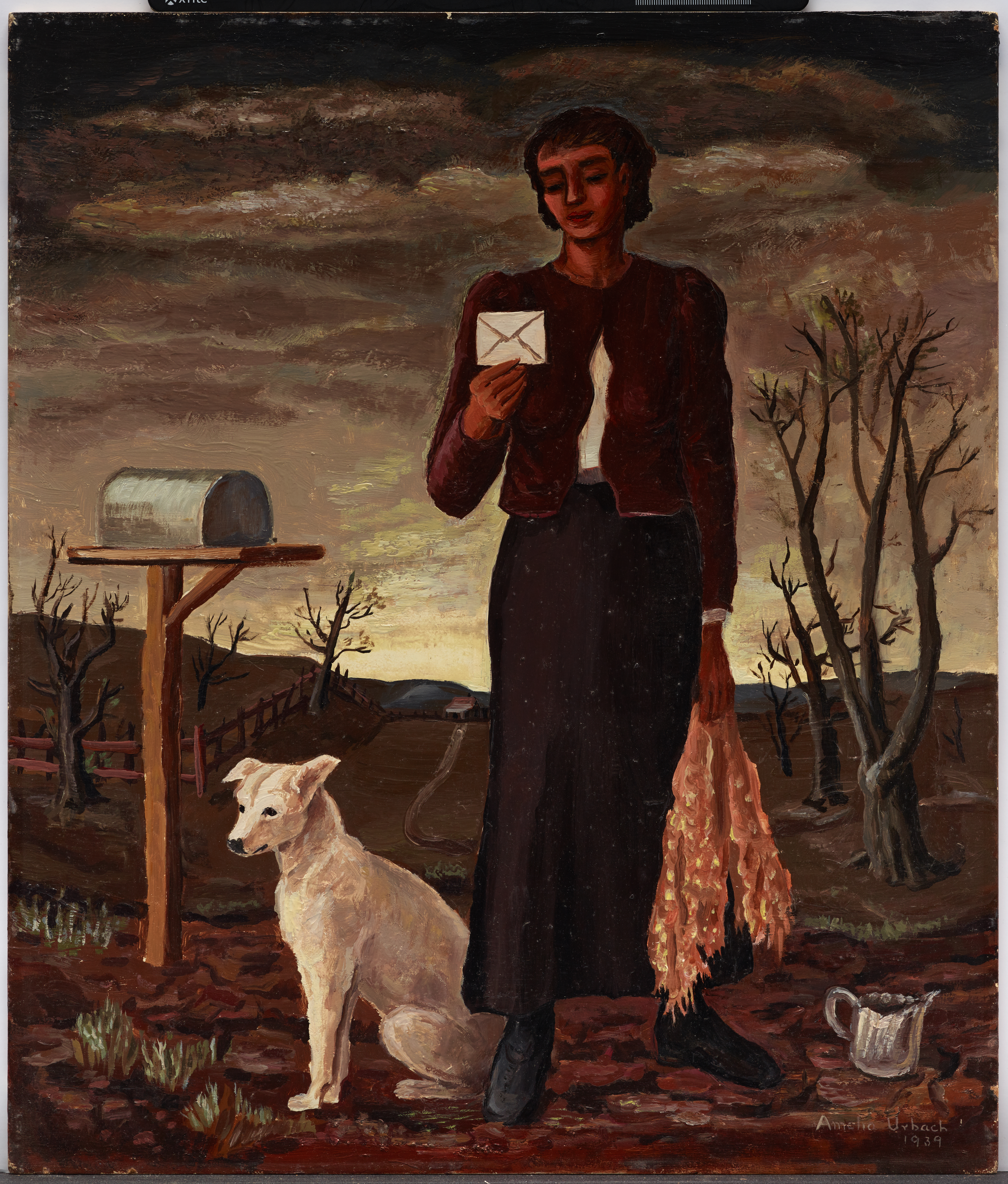
The Letter, Amelia Urbach, oil on masonite, 1939, Dallas Museum of Art.

- Amelia Urbach (1889–1969)
- Charles T. Bowling (1891–1985)
- Florence McClung (1894–1992)
- Merritt Mauzey (1898–1973)
- Otis Dozier (1904–1987)
- Jerry Bywaters (1906–1989)
- James Brooks (1906–1992)
- Everett Spruce (1908–2002)
- Lloyd L. Goff (1908–1982)
- William Lewis Lester (1910–1991)
- Bertha Landers (1911–1996)
- James Britton Gantt (1911–1984)
- Michael G. Owen (1915–1976)
- Barney Delabano (1926–1997)
