= Florence McClung =

American painter (1894–1992)

- Born: Florence Elliot White; July 12, 1894; St. Louis, Missouri, U.S.
- Died: 1992 (aged 97–98)
- Education: Southern Methodist University
- Occupations: Painter; printmaker; art teacher
- Parent(s): Charles W. White; Minerva McCoy

Florence McClung (July 12, 1894 – 1992) was an American painter, printmaker, and art teacher. She was the daughter of Charles W. and Minerva (McCoy) White and was born in St. Louis, Missouri. She moved to Dallas, Texas, as a child with her family in 1899 and lived there until her death. She later was associated with the Dallas Nine, an influential group of Dallas-based artists.

== Early life and education ==
She was born Florence Elliott White in St. Louis. She attended local schools and became deeply immersed in music, studying for a career as a concert pianist. Her mother Minerva made tapestries and may have inspired McClung to study art herself. After moving to Dallas, she graduated from Bryan High School.

== Career ==
In the early 1920s in Dallas, McClung studied pastels with Frank Reaugh, and painting with artists like Frank Klepper, Olin Travis, Thomas Stell and Alexandre Hogue.

She painted for periods of time in Taos, New Mexico, between 1928 and 1932, joining a circle that included Hogue, Mabel Dodge Luhan and Tony Luhan and the Taos Society of Artists. The town was a gathering place for artists and writers of many backgrounds, including English writer D.H. Lawrence and his wife. By the mid-1930s, McClung was well-established as a painter; the Metropolitan Museum of Art in New York purchased her painting Lancaster Valley in 1936. Soon afterward, she completed degrees in art, English and education at Southern Methodist University, and graduate work at Texas State College for Women (now Texas Woman's University) and Colorado School of Fine Arts, where she studied printmaking with Adolf Dehn. She was also Director of Art at Trinity University in Waxahachie, Texas, from 1929 to 1941.

Her art always remained deeply linked to the Texas identity and Texas regionalism. According to a review of a 1941 exhibit by her: "Underlying the work and reflected in all its manifestations is a clearly defined purpose: to make a vivid, permanent record of those phases of southwestern life which even now are disappearing". Much of McClung's work focused on the "rural farm or developed and unspoiled landscape," like North Wind, which "recorded an event and a place which she knew." Others pieces focus on places McClung traveled to, like Victor, Colorado; Taos; Cypress Swamp; and Torii-Japan.

=== Exhibitions ===
McClung had several solo exhibitions in the 1930s; a New Mexican exhibit was hosted at the Museum of Fine Art, Santa Fe. In Texas, exhibits were held at the Sartor Galleries in Dallas; the Dallas Museum of Art; the Elisabet Ney Museum in Austin; Texas Tech University in Lubbock; Trinity University in Waxahatchie; and McMurry College in Abilene, as well as the Texas Centennial Exposition held in 1936–1937. She also exhibited at the 1939 New York World's Fair, the Pennsylvania Academy of Fine Arts, and the National Association of Women Artists in New York.

=== Organizations ===
In addition to making art, in Dallas McClung became active in artists' associations and worked to promote recognition of women artists. She was an active member of the Printmakers Guild in the 1940s and 50s (it was renamed as Texas Printmakers in 1952). This guild was made up of a small group of Texas women artists, who founded it after being excluded because of their gender from the Lone Star Printmakers of Dallas, headed by Hogue and Jerry Bywaters. In 1945, she was elected the Director of the Texas Fine Arts Association, now known as the Texas Visual Arts Association. In 1946, she was elected to the board of directors of the Southern States Art League, as well as the Texas chairman for the National Association of Women Painters.

== Later life and death ==
McClung's later works were mostly serigraphs. As she approached her early sixties in the mid-1950s, she began to lose her sight and decreased her productivity. She may also have created fewer works because it became difficult for her to "reconcile her love for rural countryside with the growing urban character of Dallas". She eventually became blind in her right eye following an operation in 1986. Before she died, McClung gave several of her paintings to the Dallas Museum of Art.
