= Margaret Ann Scruggs Carruth =

20th-century Texan artist

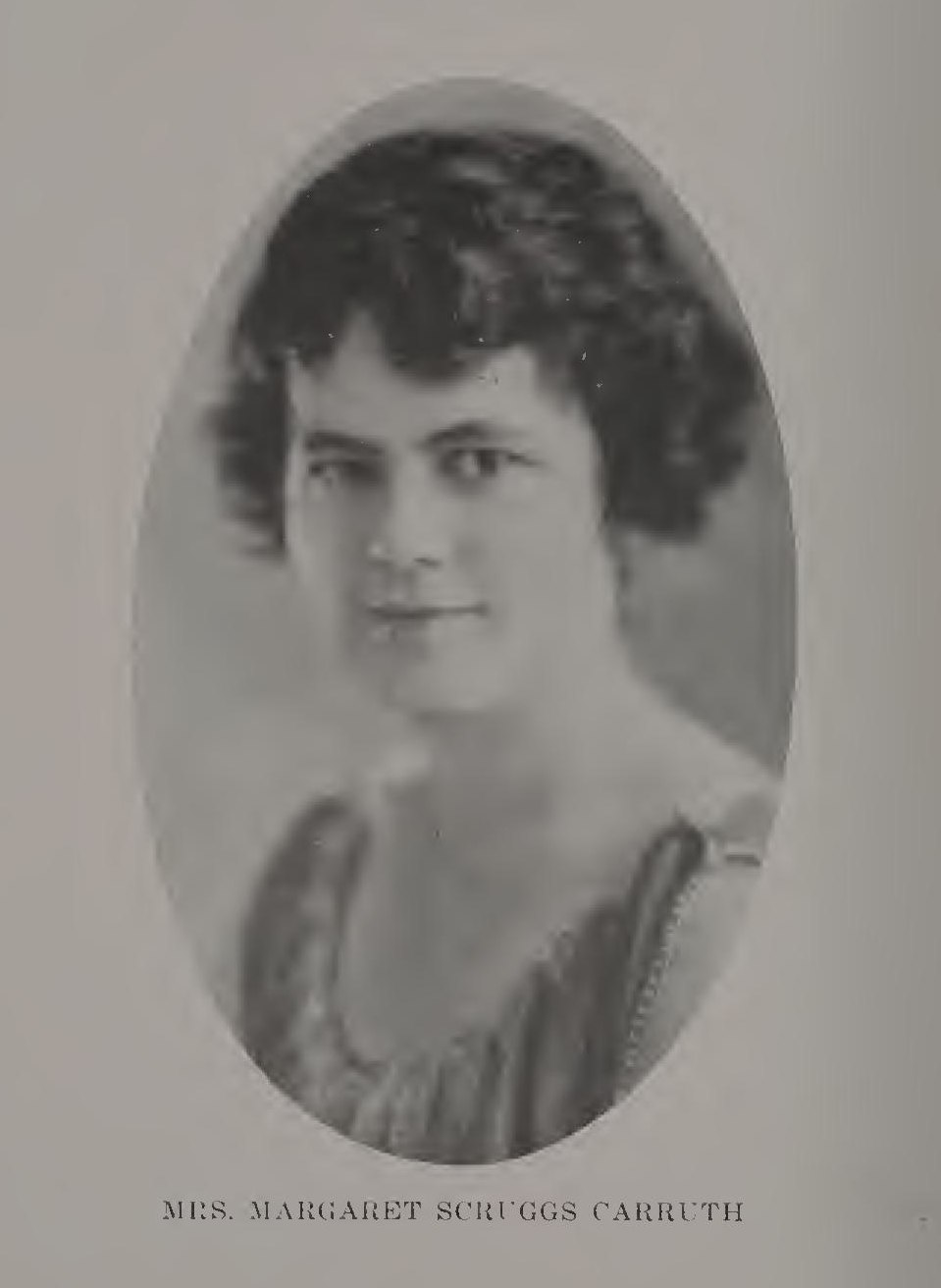
Mrs. Margaret Scruggs-Carruth, Biographies of Representative Women of The South: 1861–1925 p. 104

Margaret Ann Scruggs-Carruth (1892–1988) was a Texan etcher, printmaker, illustrator and educator. She was primarily active in the first half of the 20th century, illustrating one of the first botanical guides for native Texas plants in 1932.

== Biography ==
Margaret was born on February 18, 1892, in Dallas, Texas, the only child of Gross R. Scruggs and Mary S. Price. She came from a well-established family who were proud of their American lineage, which included the 1652 Governor of Maryland Robert Brooke and former first lady Mary Todd Lincoln. She married Raymond Carruth on June 6, 1912, and they had one son, Walter Scruggs Carruth, nearly two years later. Their only daughter, Marianne, died from bronchial pneumonia in 1918 when she was still a child.

Margaret Ann Scruggs-Carruth died in 1988 in her hometown of Dallas, at the age of 96. Upon her death, many art pieces she had collected were donated to Dallas Museum of Art. These included The Burial (1929) by James Auchiah, Head (ca.1930) by Olin Herman Travis, and The Jungle (1930–31) by Otis Dozier.

== Social life ==
Margaret participated in the local debutante scene in Dallas, making her formal social debut at the Idlewild Club Ball of 1911. While still in high school Margaret met Allie Victoria Tennant, a sculptor exactly her age who she would consider a close friend and contemporary for the next 60 years. The two were often members of the same social groups, gatherings, and exhibitions over the years, including Daughters of the American Revolution (DAR), Dallas Browning Club, Dallas Young Women's Christian Association, and the Texas Fine Arts Association.

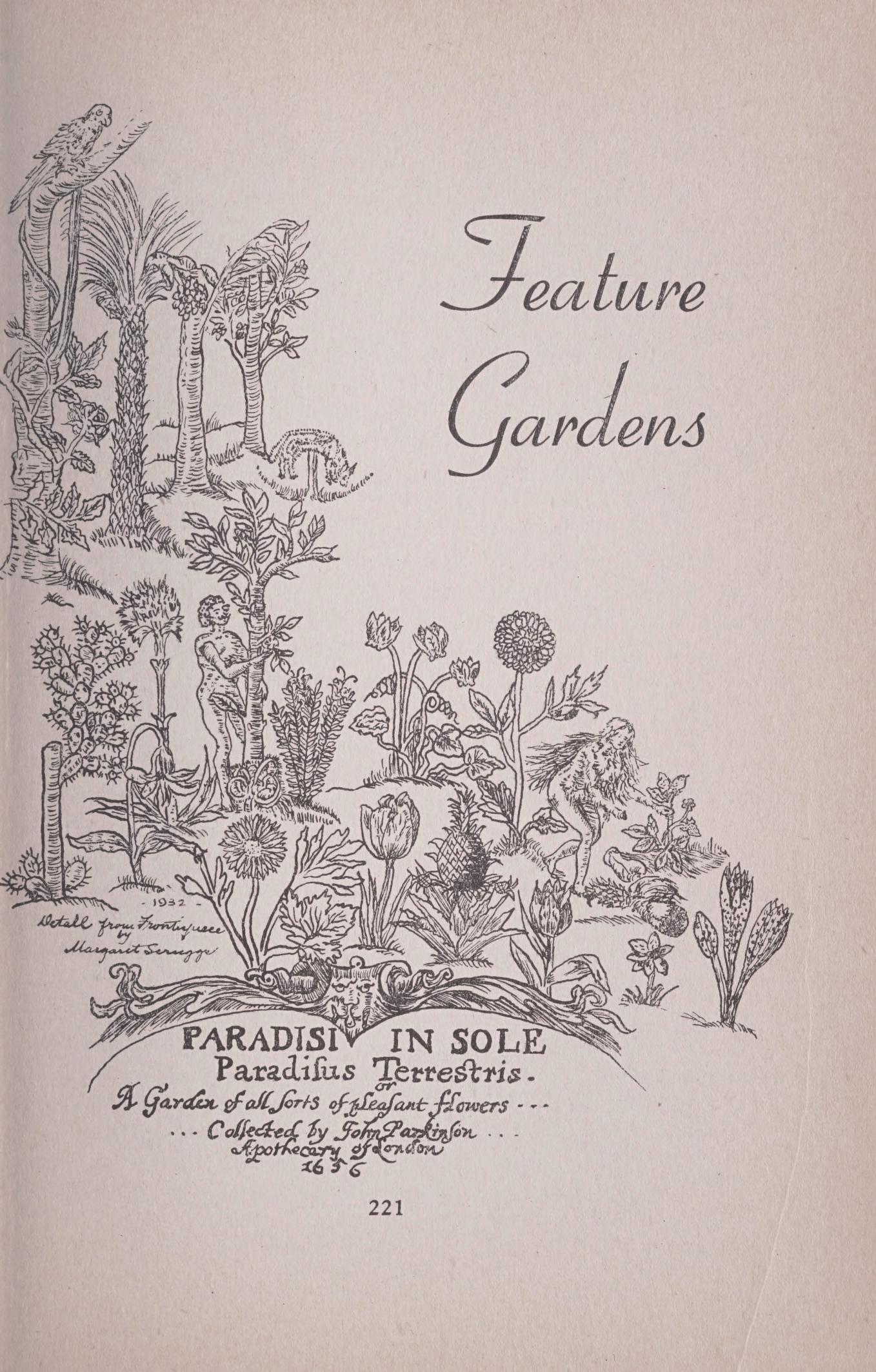
Feature Gardens, "Gardening in the South and West," Scruggs-Carruth, 1932

Throughout her life, Scruggs-Carruth was an active member of many heritage and genealogy based organizations in addition to DAR. A selection of such groups includes Hereditary Order of Descendants of Colonial Governors, Daughters of Founders and Patriots, Dallas Historical Society, The Huguenot Society of America, and Colonial Dames of America, where she once served as national secretary. Other organizations that counted Margaret as a member included the Dallas chapter of the American Red Cross, Prairie Print Makers, Dallas Women's Club, and the Dallas Little Theater Board of Directors, where she served as secretary for several years - often illustrating their pamphlets and newsletters through the 1940s.

After joining Garden Club of America and participating in the founding of the more regional Dallas Gardens Club, Margaret and her mother Mary were inspired to create a garden club of their own. In 1927 they founded the "Marianne Scruggs Garden Club," named both as a clever combination of the pair's first and middle names and as a tribute to Margaret's late daughter. The garden featured a sculpture titled The Young Bathers crafted by Allie Tennant in 1946. The garden club's special interest was in cross-breeding species of irises, amaryllises, and day-lilies that are native to northern Texas. Their efforts paid off several years later, when a selection of their successful iris hybrids earned them overseas memberships and recognition from the Royal Horticultural Society of Great Britain.

Scruggs-Carruth was a member of the English-Speaking Union in Dallas in early 1941, when the esteemed creator of the organization Sir Evelyn Wrench and his wife visited Texas from Great Britain. At this point Britain was already at war with Germany, so they felt that the need for diplomacy with oil-rich Texas was at an all-time high. Margaret served on the official reception committee to welcome the important visitors, orchestrating a decorated formal reception at the Hall of State.

== Career ==
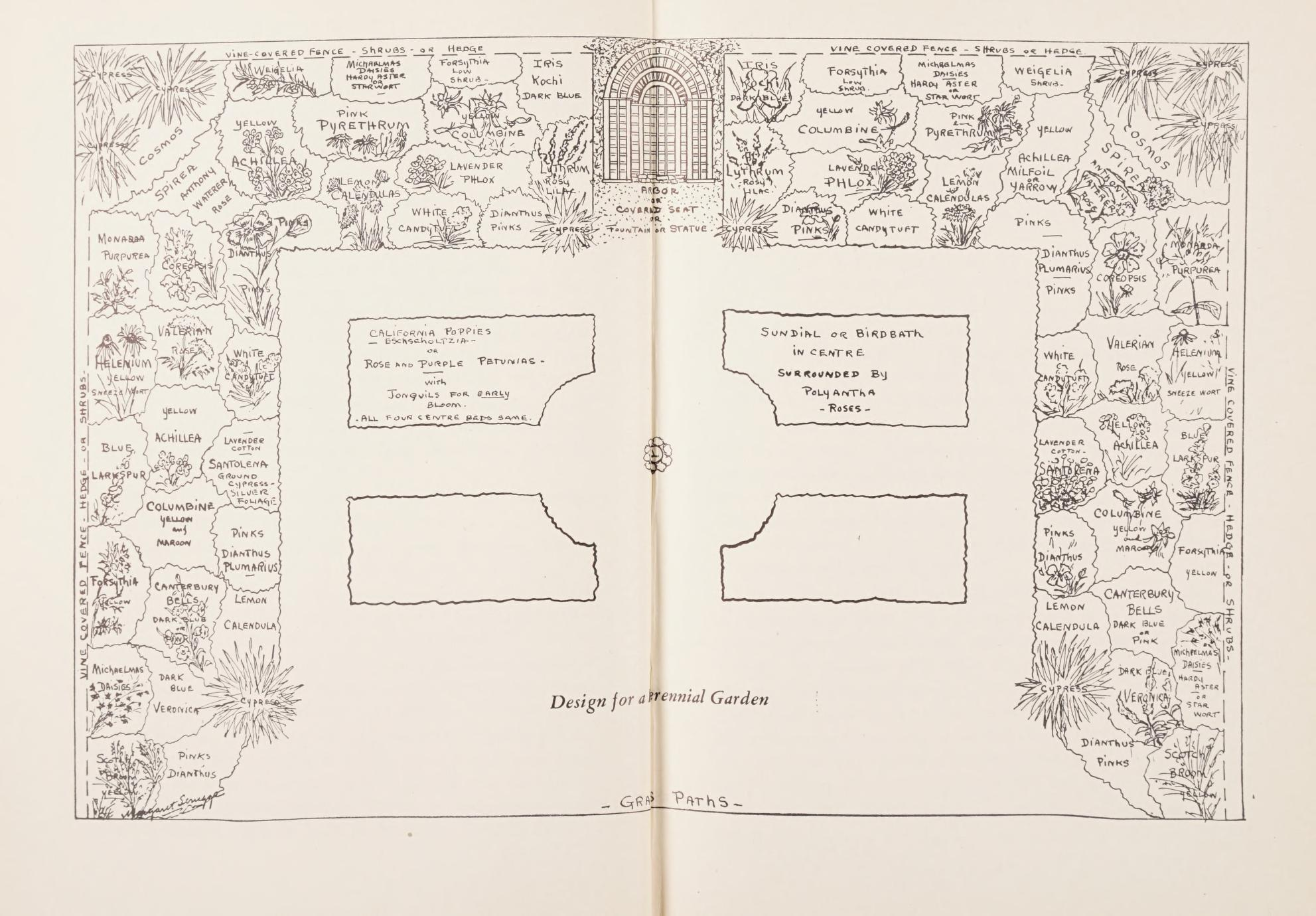
Example of A Perennial Garden, "Gardening in the South and West," Scruggs-Carruth, 1932

Margaret started her educational career at Kirk's School in Philadelphia and graduated from Bryn Mawr College in 1913. In addition to enrolling in additional courses in law and character analysis, she took classes at the Woodrow School for Expressive and Dramatic Arts, and received artistic instruction from Frank Reaugh for six years. She graduated from Southern Methodist University (SMU) with a Master's degree, and returned shortly after for a lecturing job. She eventually became a professor and served as illustrator and assistant editor for SMU's Genealogical Research Publications until her retirement.

In 1932, Margaret's mother Mary Stuart Price Scruggs wrote one of the first Texas-based botanical books, titled "Gardening in the South and West." Margaret provided all of the botanical illustrations for the 297-page publication which became popular enough to receive a reissue in 1939. An enlarged edition was edited by the pair and published by in 1949 by Doubleday & Company, Inc. from Garden City, New York. After the passing of her friend Victoria Baker Mitchell in 1950, Margaret was given the opportunity to edit a collection of her genealogical research that was published under the title "Gholson and Allied Families." She is credited on the title page for her efforts, and her edition of the book begins with a multi-page preface written in memory of her friend.

== Collections ==
Scruggs-Carruth artworks are held in numerous private and public collections, the majority of which span across the southern half of the United States.

A selection of institutions that count her work among their collections include the following:

- Dallas Museum of Art: Cynthia Ann Parker Pioneer Cabin (1925), Before The Race (1929)
- Nelson-Atkins Museum of Art: Cotton Pickers, Regale Lilies, Rock Creek, Stone Bridge, and Rose Study (ca.1934)
- The Grace Museum: Dallas Skyline 1928 (1928)
- Library of Congress: "Gardening in the Southwest" (1932), "Gardening in the South and West" (1939)
- University of North Carolina
