= Everett Spruce =

American painter

- Born: December 25, 1908; Holland, Arkansas
- Died: October 18, 2002 (aged 93); Austin, Texas
- Education: Dallas Art Institute
- Known for: Visual arts
- Movement: Regionalism
- Spouse: Alice Virginia Kramer

Everett Franklin Spruce (December 25, 1908 – October 18, 2002) was a painter, museum professional, and arts educator based in Texas. He was widely recognized as one of the earliest regional visual artists to have embraced modernism in his interpretations of the Southwestern aesthetic. As a member of the Dallas Nine, he contributed to developing a stylistic lexicon that captured realistic and unidealized perspectives of the region, shifting away from the “Old South” view of Texas. Regional nature dominated his oeuvre, and a wide array of artistic movements, music, and literature influenced his renderings of it.

== Early life ==
Spruce was born to William Everett and Fannie May Spruce, as the oldest of six, in Holland, Arkansas, a small town near Conway. When he was three, his family moved to Adams Mountain, where his father grew apples and peaches. Spending time atop the mountain in rural Arkansas sparked his curiosity for the natural world and he claimed that sketching landscapes was his way of “understanding things”.

As a teenager, Spruce moved to an area north of Mulberry with his family, where they cultivated corn and cotton. Outside of schooling and intense labor on the farm, he continued to sharpen his skills in sketching; he soon became known for drawing caricatures of his classmates and sold his work for a nickel apiece.

His intimate connection and exposure to nature throughout his upbringing shaped his art, which often focused on landscape themes. His family's Methodist background, which supports stewardship over the earth, furthered Spruce's philosophical approach to interpreting the natural world.

== Education ==
When Spruce was in high school, he was presented with the opportunity to meet artists and co-founders of the Dallas Art Institute (DAI), Kathryne Hail Travis and Olin Travis. Kathryne's mother, Maude Hail, a friend of Spruce's aunt, arranged a meeting while they were visiting Arkansas on a sketching trip. Impressed with Spruce's drawings, the Travises offered him admission to their institute to study and work for room and board. Upon graduating from Mulberry High School in 1926, Spruce moved to Dallas to attend DAI, despite his father's disapproval of him pursuing art professionally.

Under Olin's tutelage, Spruce was introduced to the “old masters” and modernist movements like Post-Impressionism and Cubism, which influenced his use of color, form, and perspectives. He was drawn to works by Cézanne, Braque, Picasso, and Matisse. Thomas Stell joined the DAI faculty in 1928, and exposed Spruce to a modernist take on learning and adopting styles across different eras, including the Quattrocento; parallels can be seen between some of Spruce's compositions and works by Mantegna and Bellini. Spruce kept up to date with the everchanging trends in modernism, but remained committed primarily to applying them within the Southwestern aesthetic. He graduated from DAI in 1929.

== Career ==
In 1931, Spruce was offered a position as a gallery assistant under the director, John S. Ankeney, at the Dallas Public Art Gallery, later renamed the Dallas Museum of Fine Arts and now known as the Dallas Museum of Art. Fortunate to have secured a stable role during the Great Depression, he continued to work at the museum for the following nine years. In 1936, he was promoted to assistant director and began teaching at the museum.

His work was included in the “Exhibition of Young Dallas Painters” at the Dallas Public Art Gallery in 1932, after which the participating artists were referred to as the Dallas Nine. He remained close with this group and other contemporaries through the then newly formed Dallas Artists League, a community of artists and patrons dedicated to promoting local art. His piece Suburban Landscape, and Sumac, by his wife, Alice Kramer, were shown at the Texas Centennial Exposition in 1936 among works by other local artists. He also joined Jerry Bywaters in forming the Lone Star Printmakers group in 1938 to circulate their works on a national scale.

Spruce left the museum in 1940 to join the University of Texas at Austin as a member of its art faculty, and remained there until his retirement in 1974. Between 1949 and 1951, he served as Chairman of the Department of Art. He earned his professorship in 1954, and graduate professorship in 1960. He spent the last thirteen years of his tenure as Director of Graduate Studio Art.

Throughout his career as a museum professional and educator, Spruce continued to paint and participate in exhibitions across the country. His work was selected into exhibitions at the Rockefeller Center, Art Institute of Chicago, Whitney Museum of American Art, Museum of Modern Art, Colorado Springs Fine Arts Center, Metropolitan Museum of Art, Witte Museum, Pennsylvania Academy of the Fine Arts, and more. Many of these museums actively acquired his paintings between the 1930s and 1950s. Among his many accolades were the Dealey Purchase Prize, first prize in the Midwestern Artist's Exhibition at the Kansas City Art Institute, top honors in the Kiest Purchase Prize, and the William W. Crocker Prize at the San Francisco Art Association. Though he received national acclaim early in his career, as movements like Pop Art and Abstract Expressionism emerged, his work slowly faded into oblivion.

== Work ==
Spruce often worked in oils, creating textural modulations using thickness and intensity of knife and brush strokes. He used acrylics in manners similar to his oils, and in some cases, used crayon over acrylics to enhance the richness of his colors. He used encaustic painting as well to produce vibrant colors and mosaic-like textures. Many of his ink and charcoal drawings, made both for discipline and in leisure, have also received recognition in exhibitions.

Through his deep response to nature, Spruce steered away from the then traditional renderings of Southwestern landscapes by artists like Frank Reaugh, to capture spirituality and discovery. Unlike many artists during the Great Depression, he did not focus his work on recounting previous American ideals or highlighting social issues of the time; instead, he interpreted how regional nature paralleled the zeitgeist and universal values through themes of abundance, isolation, renewal, and more. His work presented near-primitive stylized forms; he became known for his angular and distinct renderings of geographical features and flora, which served in alluding to unromanticized and mystic characteristics of the Southwest. One of his most celebrated works, The Hawk (1939), currently housed at MoMA, has been construed to reference Thoreau’s description of the bird observing spring's arrival, symbolic of Spruce's hope for recovery and renewal after the Dust Bowl.

Spruce experimented with different styles, and his paintings often reflected changes in artistic trends with each decade throughout his career, without seeming to compromise his unique approach to his work. Over his seven-decade career, he produced around 800 artworks rooted in his fascination for the natural world.

He rarely engaged in portraiture, but two of his most notable figurative pieces are Twins (1939), a rendering of his young twin daughters, and Alice (1979), a tribute to his wife after her death.

== Collections ==
Spruce's work can be found in the permanent collections of the Blanton Museum of Art, Dallas Museum of Art, Old Jail Art Center, Delaware Art Museum, Metropolitan Museum of Art, Museum of Fine Arts, Houston, Wichita Art Museum, Whitney Museum of American Art, The Phillips Collection, and MoMA.

== Personal life ==
In 1934, Spruce married Alice Virginia Kramer, his former classmate at the Dallas Art Institute. Together, they had four children – twin daughters, Georgia and Alice (born 1937), followed by two sons, William (born 1939) and Henry (born 1944).
