= Reaugh =

Reaugh is a surname. Notable people with the surname include:

- Daryl Reaugh (born 1965), Canadian ice hockey goaltender and broadcaster
- Frank Reaugh (1860–1945), American artist, photographer, inventor, patron of the arts, and teacher
