= Robert Grafton (artist) =

American artist from Chicago

Robert Wadsworth Grafton (Dec. 19, 1876 – Dec. 17, 1936) was an American artist known for both portraits and murals. Those he portrayed included governors from Michigan and Indiana as well as Presidents Coolidge and Hoover.

== Life and career ==
Robert Grafton was born in Chicago, Illinois in 1876. He studied at the Chicago Academy of Design (later the School of the Art Institute of Chicago), and also in Paris, Holland, and England. While in Paris, he attended the Académie Julian and showed work at the Salon. He later returned to Chicago, where he began accepting portrait commissions. Portraits he completed include those of:

- President Calvin Coolidge
- President Herbert Hoover
- Governor Edward L. Jackson (Indiana)
- Governor Harry Guyer Leslie (Indiana)
- Governor Warren Terry McCray (Indiana)
- U.S. Secretary of the Navy Edwin Denby (Michigan State Capitol)
- Governor Fred W. Green (Michigan)
- Governor Chase Osborn (Michigan)
- Col. John Hicks
- Gen. C. R. Boardman
- Cardinal Mundelin
- George Ade
- Timothy Nicholson, Earlham college
- Dr. S. R. Lyons, Indiana University
- Colonel Michael Frank
- Mary Davidson Bradford, M.A.

He also completed three murals for the Illinois State Capitol including Agriculture, Industry, and Commerce. In 1915, he began creating portraits for the Saddle & Sirloin Club. After they had a fire in 1934, he painted 162 new portraits for them, making him the club's most prolific artist.

From 1914 to 1918, Grafton spent some time in New Orleans, where he became an active member of their artistic community. There, he created collaborative murals with artist Louis Oscar Griffith, including "The Start" and "The Finish". The two artists set up a temporary studio in the St. Charles Hotel lobby, allowing passers-by to witness them painting. The commission of these murals by the St. Charles Hotel was likely a response to excitement surrounding the re-opening of the New Orleans Fair Grounds in 1915 (following the repeal of a Louisiana law against pari-mutuel gambling).

In October 1919, Grafton's artwork was on exhibit along with pieces by artist Wayman Adams in the Public Art Gallery, in a show put on by the Richmond Art Association. It included 24 of his paintings, including portraits painted in New Orleans, figure pieces, and genre subjects from the old French Quarter. These paintings were taken by Grafton to Chicago afterward for a one-man show. In 1922, the St. Charles Hotel hosted an exhibition of Grafton's work, along with work by Griffiths. An illustrated catalogue and set of postcards were published in conjunction with it. Some of the paintings on show had also been displayed at the Thurber Art Galleries in Chicago in 1917.

Grafton died in 1936 in Michigan City, Indiana. He leaves behind work in collections such as Iowa State University, the University of Wisconsin, the New Orleans Museum of Art, and the Richmond Art Museum.
