= Eugene Steinhof =

Austrian architect

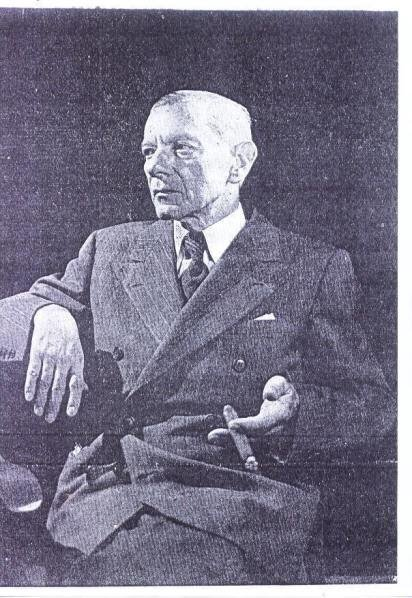
Eugen Gustav Steinhof

Eugen Gustav Steinhof (October 5, 1880, Vienna, Austria – July 10, 1952, Los Angeles, California) was a Viennese architect, painter, sculptor, and structural engineer. He was a student of Otto Wagner, Josef Hoffmann, Henri Matisse, and Adolf von Hildebrand.

He was the director of the University of Applied Arts Vienna from 1923-1930 and later taught at the Beaux-Arts Institute of Design, New York University, Cooper Union, University of Oregon, University of Southern California, and Universidade Federal do Rio Grande do Sul. His students included Fritz Wotruba, B.C. Binning, Allie Tennant, and Egon Weiner. His books Architecture and The Education of the Architect were influential in the field of architectural education.
