= Harold Dow Bugbee =

American painter (1900–1963)

- Born: August 15, 1900; Lexington, Massachusetts, US
- Died: March 27, 1963 (aged 62); Clarendon, Texas, US
- Occupations: Artist; Curator of Panhandle-Plains Historical Museum in Canyon, Texas
- Spouse(s): (1) Katherine Patrick Bugbee (m. 1935) (divorced) (2) Olive Freda Vandruff Bugbee (m. 1961–1963)

Harold Dow Bugbee (August 15, 1900 – March 27, 1963) was an American Western artist, illustrator, painter, and curator of the Panhandle-Plains Historical Museum in Canyon, Texas. Bugbee sought with considerable success to become the dominant artist of the Texas South Plains, as his role model, Charles M. Russell of Montana, accordingly sketched life of the northern Great Plains.

== Early years and education ==
Bugbee was born in Lexington, Massachusetts, to Charles H. Bugbee and the former Grace L. Dow. In 1914, the family moved to the Texas Panhandle at the suggestion of a cousin, cattleman T.S. Bugbee, and established a ranch near Clarendon, the seat of Donley County east of Amarillo. As a youth, Bugbee began sketching the multiple facets of ranch life hoping to preserve for posterity a rapidly vanishing way of life. His own experiences offered keen insight into ranch living in the Panhandle. Bugbee graduated from Clarendon High School in 1917 and attended then Methodist-affiliated Clarendon College, since a public community college. In 1918, he enrolled at Texas A&M University at College Station.

Bugbee spent many summers at the Taos art colony in Taos, New Mexico, where Bert Geer Phillips urged him to attend the Cumming School of Art in Des Moines, to study under the portrait painter Charles Atherton Cumming, who had established the art department at the University of Iowa in Iowa City. In 1921, he completed in two years a four-year curriculum at the Cumming school. In annual trips to Taos, Bugbee painted with W. Herbert Dunton, Leon Gaspard, Frank Hoffman, and Ralph Meyers. He often went camping in the Rockies to get a close-up view of nature.

== Artistic career ==
Bugbee returned to West Texas in 1921. His early patron was Ernest O. Thompson, a hotel owner, Amarillo mayor, and later, long-serving member of the Texas Railroad Commission. Thompson commissioned 14 oil paintings for the Longhorn Room of his prestigious Amarillo Hotel. He also sponsored Bugbee's first large art showing. In 1942, Thompson authorized Bugbee to paint 11 murals for the Tascosa Room of his Herring Hotel. Bugbee sold paintings to both ranchers and Western art collectors. He also sketched Christmas card designs available internationally.

In 1933, Bugbee began illustrating pen-and-ink sketches for books, magazines such as Ranch Romances, Western Stories, Country Gentleman, and Field and Stream, and also historical editions of local and regional newspapers. He also illustrated such trade publications as The Shamrock and 34 issues of the Panhandle-Plains Historical Review. Starting in 1936, with the publication of Charles Goodnight: Cowman and Plainsman, a biography of legendary cattleman Charles Goodnight, Bugbee began an enduring association with West Texas historian J. Evetts Haley. He also did the illustrations for Willie N. Lewis' Between Sun and the Sod, S. Omar Barker's Songs of the Saddleman, James R. Gober's Cowboy Justice: Tale of a Texas Lawman, and Rufe O'Keefe's Cowboy Life. During this period, Bugbee exhibited his work in Clarendon and other Texas cities, as well as in Kansas City, Missouri, Chicago, Denver, and New York City. He was a popular fixture too at the Tri-State Fair (Texas, Oklahoma, and New Mexico) held annually in Amarillo.

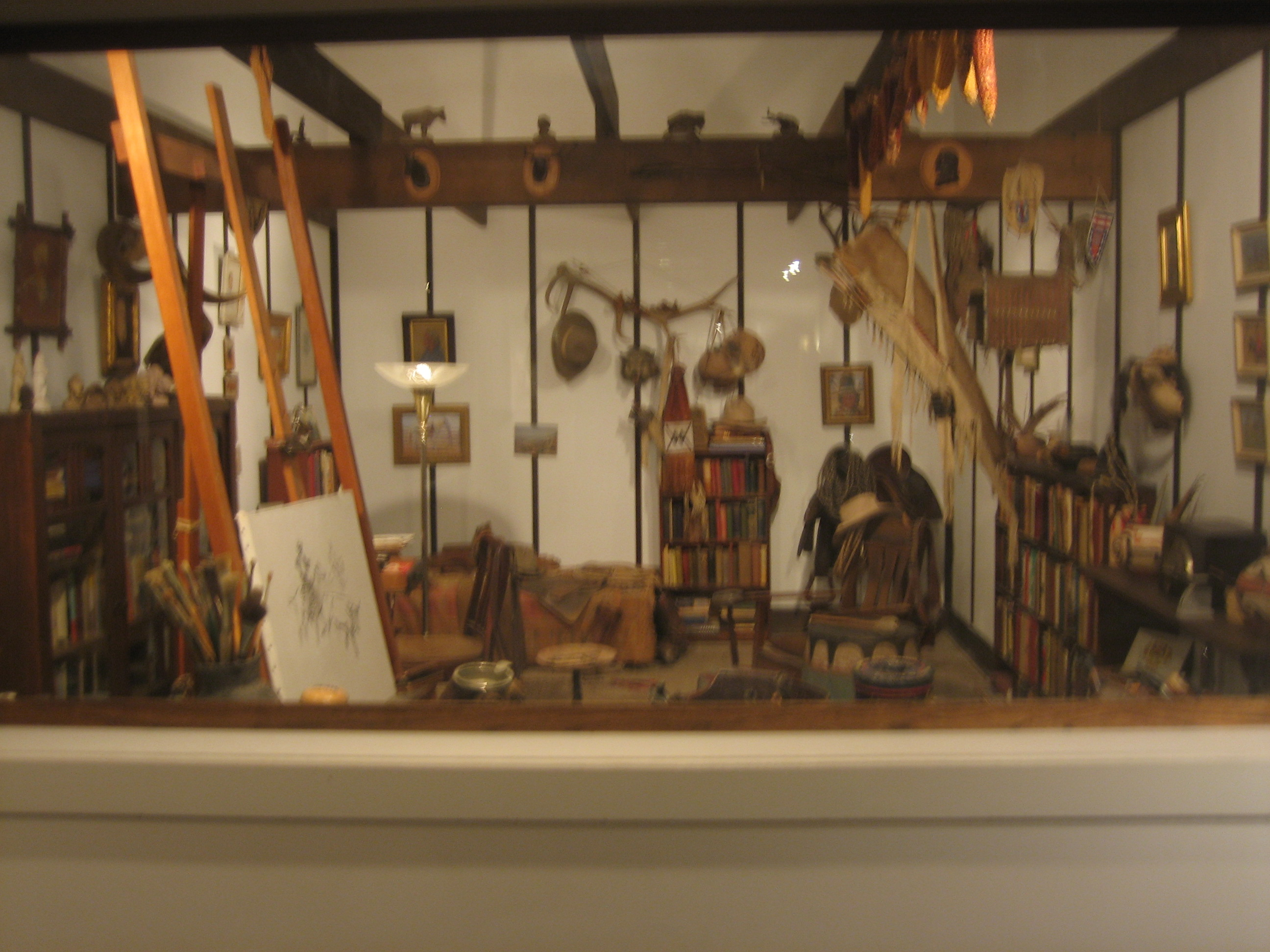
Replica of the Harold Dow Bugbee art studio at the Panhandle–Plains Historical Museum

In 1951, Bugbee became the art curator for the Panhandle-Plains Historical Society. This part-time position, which he retained until his death, permitted him to devote much of his time to painting. Another artist featured at Panhandle-Plains was Frank Reaugh, an Illinois native, who painted scenes similar to those adopted by Bugbee. Bugbee sold or donated more than 230 paintings, drawings, and prints to the society's museum in Canyon, the seat of Randall County south of Amarillo. Bugbee completed 22 murals on Indian life and ranching for the museum, the greatest of which is The Cattleman (1934), underwritten with a grant from the Federal Arts Project of the New Deal. His trail-driving scene of Texas cattleman R. B. Masterson, painted on wood panels, hangs in the Texas Hall of State in Dallas.

One of Bugbee's designs, which depicts Texas Longhorns and a cowboy crossing the Red River at Doan's Crossing north of Vernon, is featured on the 1931 Trail Driver's Monument at the ghost town of Doans, where the postmaster Corwin F. Doan also operated a store to supply the cowboys. Since 1884, Doan's May Picnic has been held on the first Saturday of May at Doans. A barbecue lunch and T-shirts are available for sale, and a king and queen are crowned at the event. Riders cross the river each year from Oklahoma, and usually arrive just before noon. The 1881 adobe house, the oldest in Wilbarger County, is open for tours during the picnic.

== Military and family life ==
In 1942, Bugbee was drafted into the United States Army at age 41, but was discharged after a year because of health problems. He served in the Army Engineer Corps. He was in the Special Services Division at Fort Sill, Oklahoma, but no record of his works on the base have been found. He painted three murals for Amarillo Army Air Field in 1943; two of the three are in the National Museum of American Art, a part of the Smithsonian Institution.

In 1935, Bugbee married the former Katherine Patrick (1904–1991); they divorced, and she died in Los Angeles. In 1961, Bugbee married the former Olive Freda Vandruff (1908–2003), the daughter of Ross Elliott Vandruff and the former Mayme L. Buskirk. Olive, an artist in her own right, whose clients included U.S. President Lyndon B. Johnson and Texas Governor Dolph Briscoe of Uvalde, did not remarry. She lived thereafter, and died at the age of 94, on the Harold Dow Bugbee Ranch in Clarendon. Bugbee died in Clarendon at the age of 62, 40 years before Olive's death. The estate, valued at $1 million, was donated on Olive's death to the Panhandle-Plains Historical Museum. Olive left the ranch largely as she found it when she moved there in 1961.

Bugbee exhibited in 1929 at Dalhart in the northwestern Panhandle, in Amarillo (1930, 1931, and 1938), in Abilene (1931), the University of Texas Centennial Exposition in Austin (1936), the Fort Worth Frontier Exposition (1936), and the West Texas Art Exhibition at Fort Worth (1939). His work was featured in exhibitions at the Panhandle-Plains Historical Museum in 1953, 1961, and posthumously, in 1970, 1987, and 1994. In 1990, the museum unveiled a reconstruction of Bugbee's studio. His exhibits were presented in 1992 at the Nita Stewart Haley Library at Midland and in 1993 at the Cattleman's Museum in Fort Worth. Also, a Bugbee exhibit is at the Saints' Roost Museum in Clarendon.
