= Louis Oscar Griffith =

American painter

Louis Oscar Griffith (1875–1956) was an American painter known for his paintings, etchings, and aquatints of landscapes, especially of scenes in Brown County, Indiana, and Texas. He was born in Newcastle, Indiana in 1875, but five years later moved with his family to Dallas, Texas, where, in his teens, he took art lessons in landscape artist's Frank Reaugh's studio and traveled with Reaugh and other students on sketching exhibitions in West Texas. He then studied at the St. Louis School and Museum of Fine Arts before moving to Chicago in the mid-1890s to study at the Art Institute and work as a commercial artist. After a one-year New York interlude in 1902-03, he returned to Chicago.

Working as an illustrator at Barnes-Crosby Engraving in Chicago, he became interested in etching. In 1908, he traveled in France and England, painting, making sketches for prints and honing his printmaking skills. One of his Brittany paintings—"The River Aven"— was part of the Art Institute's thirteenth annual exhibition of Chicago artists and appeared in the Chicago Journal (February 2, 1909). Griffith had joined the Palette and Chisel Club, which took sketching trips in the outdoors, and, at the suggestion of one of its members in 1907 had visited Brown County, Indiana. That visit began decades of painting and sketching those wooded hills. Eventually, in 1922, Griffith moved to Brown County with his wife (he married Carolyn Maulsby in 1920) to join the Brown County Art Colony.

During the cold Hoosier winters between 1926 and 1930, Griffith made return trips to Texas, where he had sketched his earliest landscapes under the guidance of Frank Reaugh. When Griffith's Texas landscapes were featured in a 2010 exhibit at the Tyler Museum of Art in Tyler, Texas, TMA's director, Kimberley Tomio, called the exhibition "the first exposure that scholars and collectors of early Texas art as well as the general public will have to view this powerful and beautiful body of work,” said Kimberley Tomio, TMA Director.
