= Allie Tennant =

American sculptor (1892/98–1971)

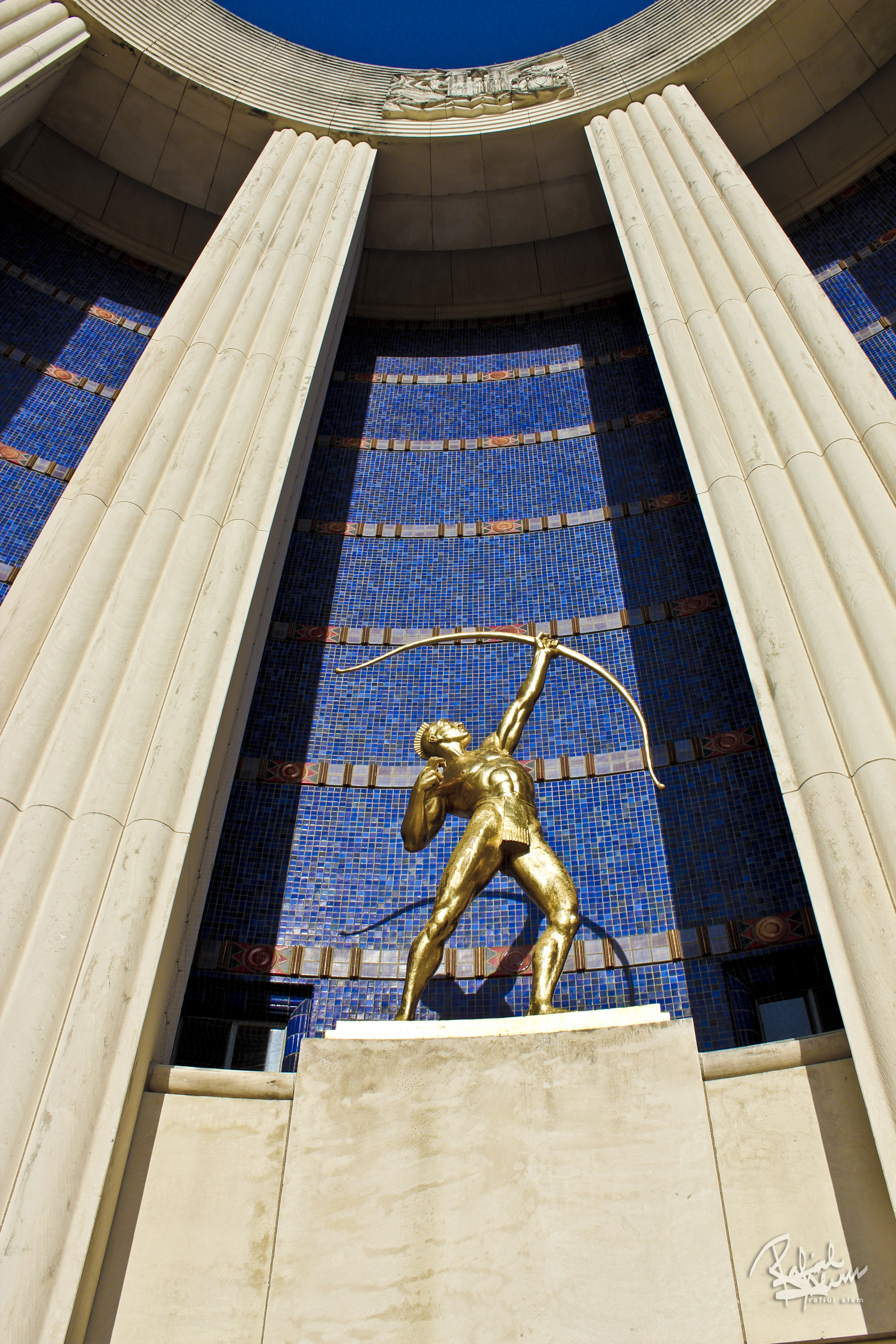
Tejas Warrior, entrance to the Hall of State (1936)

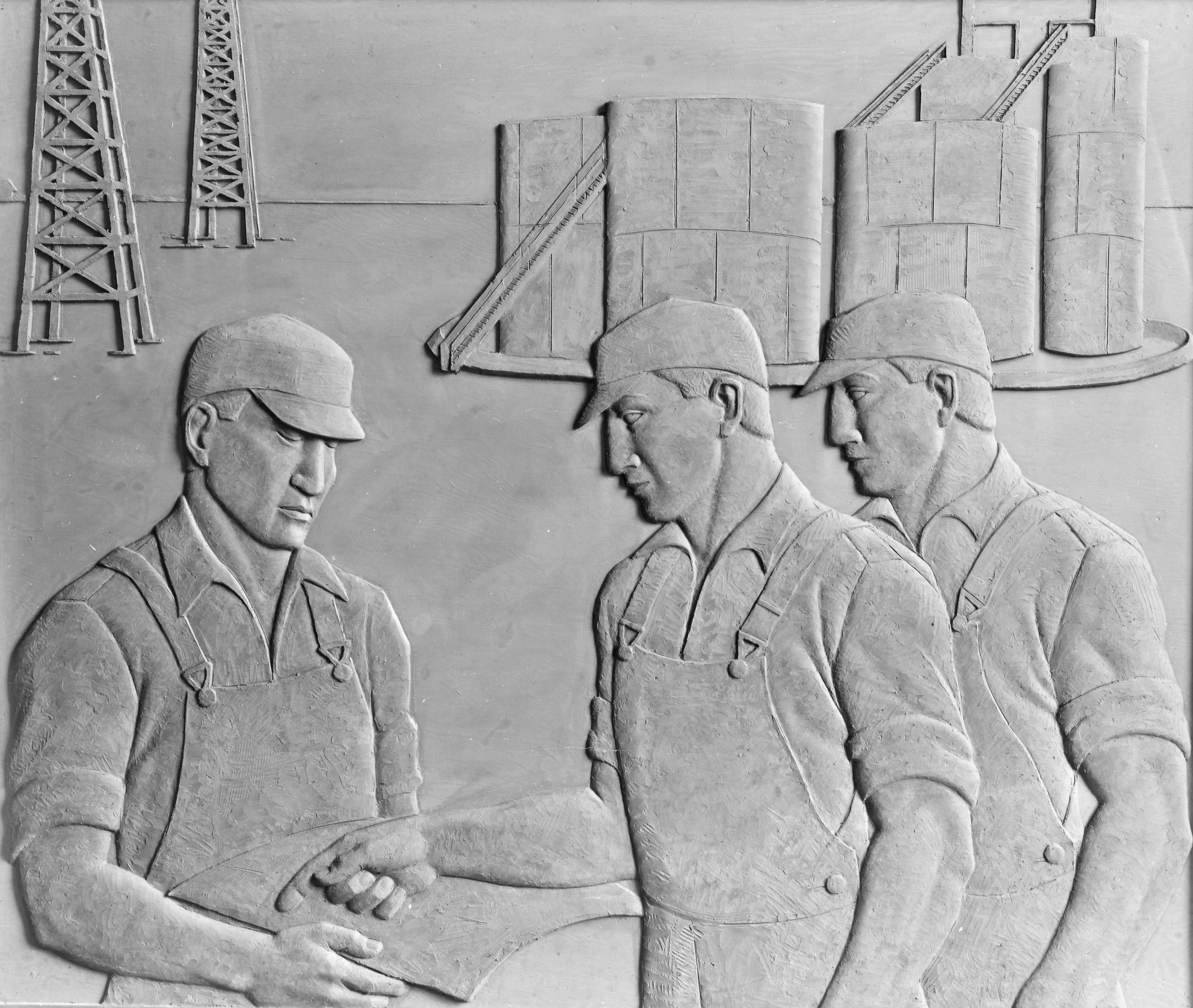
"Oil", center panel of the three-panel plaster relief sculpture Cattle, Oil, Wheat (1940) by Tennant for the post office in Electra, Texas

Allie Victoria Tennant (1892 or 1898—1971) was an American sculptor born in St. Louis, Missouri, the daughter of Thomas Richard and Allie Virginia Brown Tennant. She worked primarily out of Dallas, Texas, where her most famous work Tejas Warrior was produced for the Hall of State at the Texas Centennial Exposition.

Tennant grew up in an artistic household. Her father was a descendant of British painter John Frederick Tennant and he painted with watercolor and oils in his free time. Tennant's talent as an artist and sculptor emerged at a young age. Even as a toddler, she played with clay and other malleable materials and sculpted them into models. When she was a teenager, Tennant and her family moved to Dallas, Texas. Here, she attended Dallas High School and decided to become a professional sculptor during her high school years. She then started studying art with her first instructor, a local painter and teacher Vivian Louise Aunspaugh (1869-1960). As a high school student, Tennant enrolled in classes that were provided by the Texas Art League, where she studied with Gaetano Bianchi, the first sculptor to teach her, and Kunz Meyer Waldeck, an internationally known artist from Germany.

After graduating from high school, she enrolled in the Aunspaugh School of Art. In 1927, she moved to New York City, where she studied at the Art Students League with Edward McCartan and George Bridgman. In 1930, she spent a year touring Europe, where she stayed several years and visited museums in England, France, and Italy. She then returned to New York to study with Eugene Steinhof. Throughout her life, Tennant played an important role in the cultural development of the arts in Dallas and also Texas and developed the modern arts community by acting as a culture-bearer for over 60 years.

During the Great Depression, President Franklin Delano Roosevelt initiated the New Deal. One of its programs was the Treasury Department Section of Painting and Sculpture, under which the federal government commissioned artists to create art for a variety of public buildings, often post offices. Tennant created a frieze of three plaster reliefs — Cattle, Oil, Wheat (1940) — for the U.S. post office in Electra, Texas.

Tennant showed at the 1939 New York World's Fair American art exhibition. Tennant was a member of the National Sculpture Society and the Texas Fine Arts Association (now known as Arthouse at The Jones Center). She also taught art at the Art Institute of Dallas and at adult evening education.

She died on December 19, 1971, and was buried in Oakland Cemetery in Dallas.

== Work ==
- Mrs. George K. Meyer (ca. 1935), and Negro Head (1933), Dallas Museum of Art (1933)
- Tejas Warrior, Hall of State, Dallas, Texas (1936)
- Tejas Warrior, Brookgreen Gardens, South Carolina, a smaller version of the Dallas statue

The statue underwent extensive restoration in 1990 under Dallas' "Adopt-a-Monument program.

- Sea Horse Panels, Dallas Aquarium, 1936
- José Antonio Navarro Monument, Navarro County Courthouse, Corsicana, Texas, (1938)
- James Butler Bonham, Fannin County Courthouse, Bonham, Texas (1936)
- Cattle, Oil, Wheat, United States Post Office, Electra, Texas (1940)

She also has works at:

- Hockaday School, Dallas
- Southwest Medical College, Dallas
- Woman’s Club, Dallas
- McMurry University, Abilene
