= Alexandre Hogue =

American painter (1898–1994)

- Born: February 22, 1898; Memphis, Missouri
- Died: July 22, 1994 (aged 96); Tulsa, Oklahoma
- Movement: Dallas Nine; Realist
- Children: Olivia Marino

Alexandre Hogue (February 22, 1898 – July 22, 1994) was an American artist active from the 1930s through the 1980s. He was a realist painter associated with the Dallas Nine; the majority of his works focus on Southwestern United States and South Central United States landscapes during the Dust Bowl.

== Biography ==
Hogue was born on February 22, 1898, in Memphis, Missouri, to Reverend Charles Lehman Hogue and Mattie Hoover. Soon after, the Hogues moved to Denton, Texas, and later Alexandre attended the Bryan Street High School in Dallas, Texas, graduating in 1918. After a year at the Minneapolis College of Art and Design, Hogue moved home to Dallas, where he was employed at the Dallas Morning News as an illustrator. In 1921, Hogue moved to New York City to work at various advertising firms with calligraphy assignments and to study in museums. He traveled back to Texas every summer while in New York to sketch with Charles Franklin Reaugh until he decided to stay in Texas in 1925 to paint.

In 1931, Hogue began teaching art classes at the Texas State College for Women and went on to become the head of the art department at Hockaday Junior College in 1936. In 1938, Hogue married Maggie Joe Watson. During World War II, Hogue worked at North American Aviation.

From 1945 to 1963, he became the head of the art department at the University of Tulsa. After his retirement from the University of Tulsa, the institution founded the Alexandre Hogue Gallery in his honor. Hogue remained in Tulsa until his death on July 22, 1994.

== Career ==
Hogue's mother had a huge influence on his work; she taught him about “Mother Earth,” which became a key concept to most of his paintings, specifically Mother Earth Laid Bare in 1936. Hogue connected the human body to the natural world, recalling his mother's words that “...conjured up visions of a great female figure under the ground everywhere- so I would tread easy on the ground." In addition, the effects that the Dust Bowl had on the land that Hogue had grown to love had a profound effect on his works. The loss of the grasslands in the Texas Panhandle influenced his ecocentric views that are displayed in his paintings. Hogue claimed that his artistic style was not influenced during his time in the museums of New York City. He has been quoted as saying that he did not do any painting during this time to avoid the inevitable shift in personal style that comes with the analysis of other works. Hogue also refused to be influenced by his companions Franklin Reaugh and Ernest Blumenschein.

Hogue is associated with the Dallas Nine, a group that painted, drew, sculpted, and printed pieces influenced by the Southwestern United States. This idea was unique compared to the movement towards drawing from European traditions. In contrast with the Impressionist or Abstract art styles, the Dallas Nine created realistic pieces according to their surroundings in the Southwest. The other eight artists included in this movement were Jerry Bywaters, Thomas Stell, Harry Carnohan, Otis Dozier, William Lester (artist), Everett Spruce, John Douglass (artist), and Perry Nichols. These artists and others worked together at the Dallas Artists League in 1932 and were featured in the Dallas Museum of Fine Arts.

The Dallas Nine movement ended with the beginning of the Abstract Expressionism style that gained further popularity after World War II. However, Hogue used the Southwest region in a much different manner than the other members of the Dallas Nine school. Occasionally, Hogue is labeled as a Regionalist; he struggled with the idea of a Texan identity, like many other citizens of the state. However, he never referred to himself as a Regionalist. By definition his works were of the Regionalist genre, yet Hogue attempted to avoid this category. His realist landscapes of the Dust Bowl were more blaming Texans rather than identifying with them. As before, Hogue believed the destroyed state of the land was the fault of the human inhabitants.

As the 1930s began, Hogue's style began to emerge. He focused primarily on natural processes as well as the world of Native Americans and their relationship with the land. Hogue called himself an “abstract realist,” saying that naturalism is not possible because every artist recreates a realistic landscape and changes it to fit their own idea of what the view really looks like. He argues that naturalism is created in the head of the artist. In the 1960s Hogue's self-defined style shifted more towards the abstract end. With realism still intact, Hogue did drawings and paintings of realistic images, but from different points of view, such as close- up studies like the Tent Olive images.

Hogue painted during and after the Great Depression, which greatly affected most of his works. He was not employed by the Works Progress Administration or Federal Art Project, unlike other artists during the Great Depression,

Hogue chose to blame humans instead of evoking sympathy for them in his work. According to Hogue, people were at fault for the Dust Bowl because of their maltreatment and disrespect towards nature. This can be seen in Hogue's work and others by the symbol of the tractor in works like The Crucified Land in 1936. The tractor was a key instrument of land destruction that Hogue believed led to the Dust Bowl and its effects. It also represents the move towards machines in the fields instead of farmers, leaving the farmers no opportunity to work. Another device used to express Hogue's dissatisfaction with the human race is the flesh imagery.

By representing the land as the body of a female figure, as in 1936's Mother Earth Laid Bare, Hogue is relating the maltreatment of the land to murder. Mother Earth Laid Bare also presents another disturbing image of land abuse. Clearly, the earth is related to the body of a woman, Mother Earth; the plow becomes a symbol for the rape of the land. The landscape and the woman are both rendered completely barren by the plow. The land is beyond the point of help as water runs off instead of being absorbed. This is a clear statement by Hogue concerning the social context: we have caused the loss of life and we can never return it to its fertility.

== Drouth Stricken Area ==
In Hogue's 1934 painting Drouth Stricken Area, line, texture, and balance all allude to his views on the ecological environment of the 1930s. On the right side of the painting is a strip of land that points back to the horizon line; the line that is created here allows the eye to move from the busy foreground to the barren background. The horizon line and background are completely void of life except for the windmill structure in the far distance. This allows the viewer's eye to travel along that line to understand the vastness of the damage done to the land by its inhabitants. Also along this line are stumped posts, covered by wind-eroded soil. This references the erosion that contributed to the infertility and uselessness of the soil. The audience is drawn to these covered posts by the line that is formed by the newly eroded soil.

Hogue also utilizes texture to illustrate the state of the land in the Dust Bowl. In the foreground, the soil has a dry, cracked texture, clearly showing the lack of moisture in the ground. This drought-induced texture, however, is centered on man-made structures. The background has almost no structures, and the land is smooth. The foreground is clustered with houses, gates, and a windmill and this is where the ground is the driest. Here, Hogue is blaming people for the drought and Dust Bowl.

In terms of composition, almost all of the objects are placed in the direct foreground. This not only distances man from nature, but also creates a vast landscape that is filled with nothing at all. The lack of any defining marks from the middle to the background create a desolate, empty and barren space. This, once again, is Hogue commenting on the state of the land and the level of destruction done by people.

Lea Rossen DeLong argues that the single windmill on the horizon line in the distance makes the space look even more empty and barren. She also notes that farm and the cow have clearly been left to dry out by careless humans. Compared to photography of this time, Hogue's painting instead instills anger towards humans instead of empathy for their unfortunate situation. Hogue has commented, however, that his paintings are not meant to be negative exactly, but instead to point out the benefits of preserving the land. Drouth Stricken Area is an example of psychoreality, in which Hogue uses certain images to highlight the reality of the situation. By exaggerating the vast landscape, starving livestock and skyscraper windmill, Hogue is forcing people to consider the reality that he sees. This is the premise of psychoreality, or, thinking about the reality of a situation because of the magnified items presented. Psychoreality distorts the realism that Hogue was known for, yet it still got his ecocentric message across.

== Artworks ==
- – 23 Skiddoo, 1964, Department of Special Collections, McFarlin Library, University of Tulsa.
- – Avalanche by Wind, 1944, University of Arizona.
- – The Crucified Land, 1939, Thomas Gilcrease Institute of American History and Art.
- – Drouth Stricken Area, 1934, Dallas Museum of Fine Art.
- – Drought Survivors, 1936, Musee National D’Art Moderne.
- – Dust Bowl, 1933, Smithsonian American Art Museum, Smithsonian Institution.
- – The Fiftieth, 1961, Department of Special Collections, McFarlin Library, University of Tulsa.
- – Howdy Neighbor, 1936, Alexandre Hogue Gallery, University of Tulsa.
- – Irrigation – Taos, 1931, The Art Museum of South Texas.
- – J. Frank Dobie, 1931, Department of Special Collections, McFarlin Library, University of Tulsa.
- – Lava Capped Mesa, Big Bend, 1976, Department of Special Collections, McFarlin Library, University of Tulsa.
- – Mother Earth Laid Bare, 1938, Philbrook Art Center.
- – Oil in the Sandhills, 1944, Musee National D’Art Moderne, Pompidou Centre, Paris.
- – Soil and Subsoil, 1940, Oklahoma Art Center.
- – Zinnigo-Zee-Zee, 1972, Department of Special Collections, McFarlin Library, University of Tulsa.

== Exhibitions ==
- – Allied Arts Exhibition of Dallas County, 1930–34, 1937; Dallas Museum of Fine Arts, Dallas, Texas.
- – Painting and Sculpture from Sixteen American Cities, 1933; Museum of Modern Art, New York, New York.
- – Modern American Painting, 1939; Boyer Galleries, New York, New York.
- – Exhibition of Southwestern Painting, 1947; Dallas Museum of Fine Arts, Dallas, Texas.
- – Images of Texas, 1983; Archer M. Huntington Art Gallery, University of Texas, Austin, Texas.
- – Alexandre Hogue: An American Visionary, Paintings and Works on Paper, 2011; Art Museum of South Texas, Corpus Christi, Texas.
- – An American Visionary: Alexandre Hogue – Paintings and Works on Paper. 2013 through 2014, the Rockwell Museum, Corning, New York.
- – Alexandre Hogue: The Erosion Series, 2014; Dallas Museum of Art, Dallas Texas.

== Sources ==
- Curlee, Kendall. “Dallas Nine.” The Handbook of Texas Online. http://www.tshaonline.org/handbook/online/articles/kjd01 (accessed February 10, 2008)
- Dallas Museum of Art. “Alexandre Hogue.” Dallas Museum of Art. https://web.archive.org/web/20110721150412/http://dallasmuseumofart.org/Dallas_Museum_of_Art/View/Collections/American/ID_010807?ssSourceNodeId=1558 (accessed February 10, 2008).
- DeLong, Lea Rosson. “Alexandre Hogue.” The Handbook of Texas Online. http://www.tshaonline.org/handbook/online/articles/fhoad (accessed February 10, 2008).
- DeLong, Lea Rosson. Nature’s Forms/Nature’s Forces: The Art of Alexandre Hogue. Tulsa, Oklahoma: University of Oklahoma Press, 1984.
- Flores, Dan. “Canyons of the Imagination.” Southwest Art (1989): 70-76.
- Noverr, Douglas A. “Unlovely Subjects: Four Paintings from the Great Depression.” Landscape 27 no. 2 (1983): 37-42.
- White, Mark Andrew. “Alexandre Hogue’s Passion: Ecology and Agribusiness in The Crucified Land.” Great Plains Quarterly 26 no. 2 (2006): 67-83.
- Retzlaff, Ronald K. "Alexandre Hogue, Soil and Subsoil". Art Museum of South Texas, Corpus Christi, TX from my personal observation, 2011.
