= Jones Center on Congress Avenue =

Art museum in Austin, Texas, US

Coordinates: 30°16′09″N 97°44′34″W

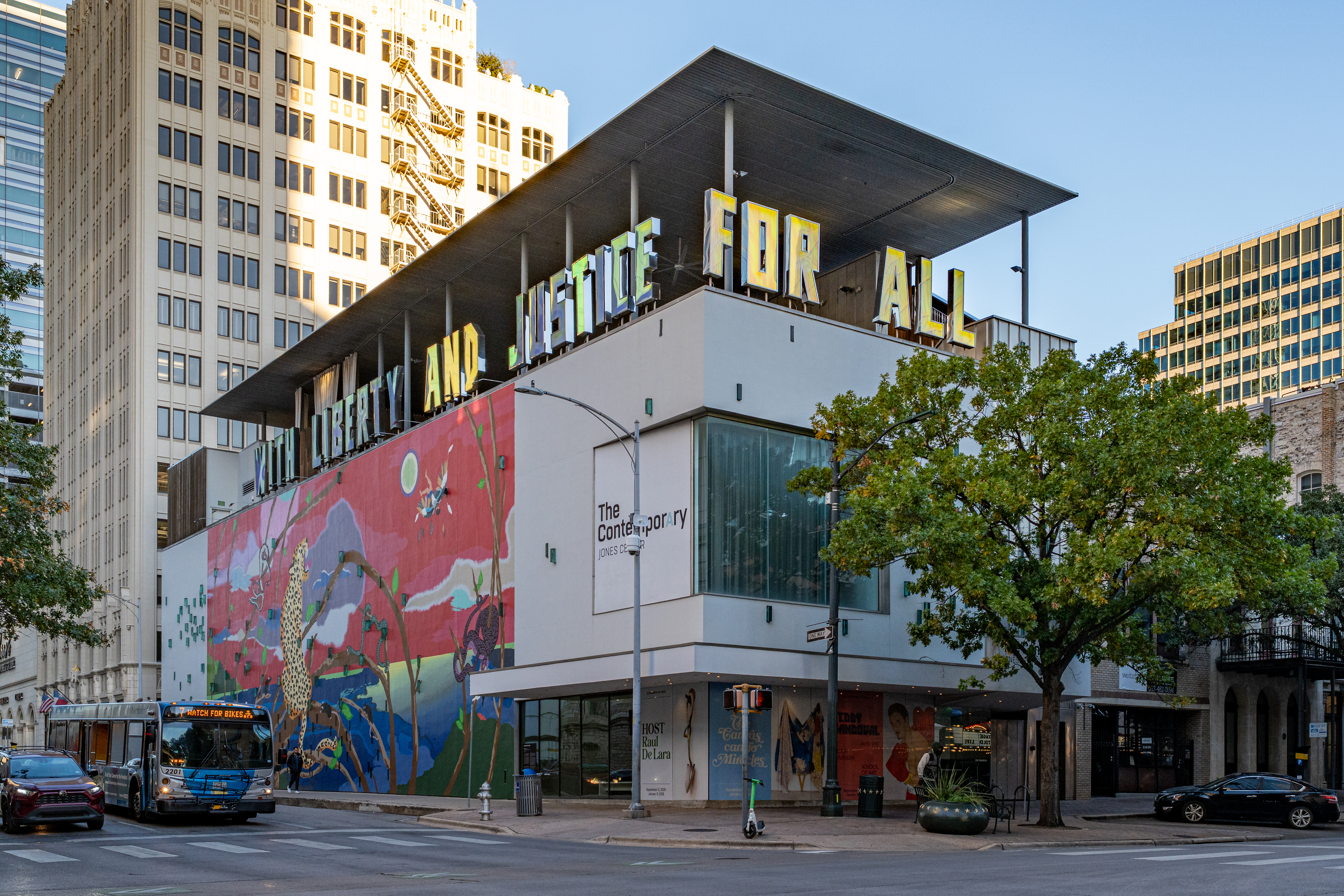
The Contemporary Austin – Jones Center on Congress Avenue

The Jones Center on Congress Avenue, formerly known as the AMOA-Arthouse at the Jones Center, is one of two museum sites of the Contemporary Austin, the other location being Laguna Gloria.

== History ==
The Texas Fine Arts Association (TFAA) was founded in 1911, with the initial purpose of maintaining the studio and collection of the sculptor Elisabet Ney, which is now housed at the Elisabet Ney Museum. The TFAA also helped to establish the studio art department at the University of Texas at Austin, promote the formation of a state arts commission, and found some of the state's major art museums. In 1927, the TFAA began a visual arts touring program that brought works of art to communities throughout the state.

In 1943, Clara Driscoll deeded her Austin estate, Laguna Gloria, to the TFAA, which operated the facility as an art museum until 1961, when Laguna Gloria Art Museum, Inc., assumed responsibility. Until the end of 1998, the TFAA maintained its state headquarters in the carriage house on the property and held three annual exhibitions in the main building.

In 1995, the TFAA's board of directors purchased the property at 700 Congress Avenue in Austin, Texas. Three years later, in November 1998, the TFAA opened its new headquarters, the Jones Center for Contemporary Art.

In November 2002, the name of the organization was officially changed from the Texas Fine Arts Association to Arthouse.

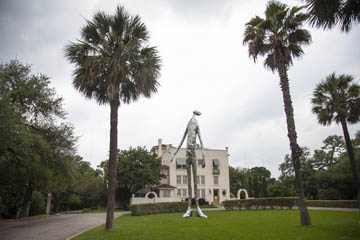
The Contemporary Austin – Laguna Gloria

In 2010 and again in 2016, the architectural firm Lewis.Tsurumaki.Lewis (LTL) completed radical expansions and renovations to the property at 700 Congress Avenue. As part of the remodeling, LTL and the New York City-based lighting design firm LumenArch installed 177 LED-lit rectangular laminated glass blocks perforating the southern and eastern walls of the building to create a "glowing" effect. The building includes 7,000 square feet of exhibition space, along with a community room and a large rooftop deck with a 21-foot-high canopy for events and educational programming.

In 2011, the Arthouse at the Jones Center merged with the Austin Museum of Art, and in 2013, it was rebranded as the Contemporary Austin, with two museum locations under its auspices—Jones Center on Congress Avenue and Laguna Gloria.

== See also ==
- List of museums in Central Texas
