= Vivian Louise Aunspaugh =

American painter (1869–1960)

- Born: August 14, 1869; Bedford, Virginia, US
- Died: March 9, 1960 (aged 90)
- Education: John Henry Twachtman at the Art Students League of New York, with Alphonse Mucha at Académie Colarossi, and in Rome
- Known for: Painting

Vivian Louise Aunspaugh (born Bedford, Virginia, August 14, 1869 - died Dallas, Texas, March 9, 1960) was an American painter and art teacher who founded the first art school in the American Southwest to use live models, nude and draped.

== Early life ==
Aunspaugh was born on August 14, 1869 to John Henry Aunspaugh and Virginia Fields (Yancy) Aunspaugh in Bedford, Virginia. Aunspaugh's father was a cotton buyer, and the family followed him to various locations in the South during her childhood - Virginia, Alabama, South Carolina, and finally Georgia. At sixteen Aunspaugh was awarded the Excelsior Art Medal when she graduated from Shorter College (in Rome, Georgia). She began teaching at Women's College (Union Springs, Alabama).

The next year, she continued her studies. Over the next five years she spent time studying in New York with John Henry Twachtman at the Art Students League of New York and in Paris with Alphonse Mucha at Académie Colarossi and in Rome.

== Career ==
Returning to America in 1890, she taught art at various schools and colleges for the next decade, including McKinney College in Texas, Greenville Public Schools, and Masonic Female College in Mississippi. In Dallas she taught at Patton Female Seminary and St Mary's College. In 1900 she received a gold medal award when she exhibited at the Exposition Universelle in Paris. As a painter, Aunspaugh usually worked in pastels and watercolors and made landscapes, flowers, figures, portraits, and miniatures.

Aunspaugh taught art in Dallas in 1898 with sculptor Clyde Giltner Chandler, a fellow teacher at St. Mary's College in San Antonio, and in 1902 founded the Aunspaugh Art School and offered courses in commercial art and fine art, as well as drawing from models, nude and otherwise. At the time, not unusual for the time, only men made life drawings, during which time women would paint china. Chandler left Texas in 1903 to study in Chicago, and Aunspaugh continued to run the school herself. The school was first located in downtown Dallas in the Dreyfuss Building and then at 3509 Bryan Street. She lived on Bryan Street, one block from her school, with her mother Virginia and sister Florence.

Aunspaugh was art editor for the Dixieland magazine, which was first issued in 1904. At that time, the Texas art community was just developing. The first annual exhibition of the Fort Worth Art Association was held in 1910. From 1912 to 1932 she ran the annual art exhibits of the Dallas Women's Forum, which were influential in introducing collectors to Texas artists.

Aunspuagh and her students formed the Vivian L. Aunspaugh Art Club in 1945; it held its first exhibition in 1946. In 1956 club members exhibited at the Dallas Museum of Fine Arts. It ceased operations in 1986.

Her work has been included in a number of museum exhibitions, such as Early Texas Artists, 1900-1950 (The Grace Museum, 2006) and Lone Star Still Lifes (Panhandle–Plains Historical Museum, 2009).

== Death ==
She continued to teach art until shortly before her death in 1960 at age 90.

== Legacy ==
Aunspaugh left a bequest to the University of Virginia, which still has an Aunspaugh Fellowship for graduate students in art.
