= Elisabet Ney Museum =

Art museum in Austin, Texas

- Elisabet Ney Studio and Museum
- U.S. National Register of Historic Places
- Recorded Texas Historic Landmark
- Texas State Antiquities Landmark
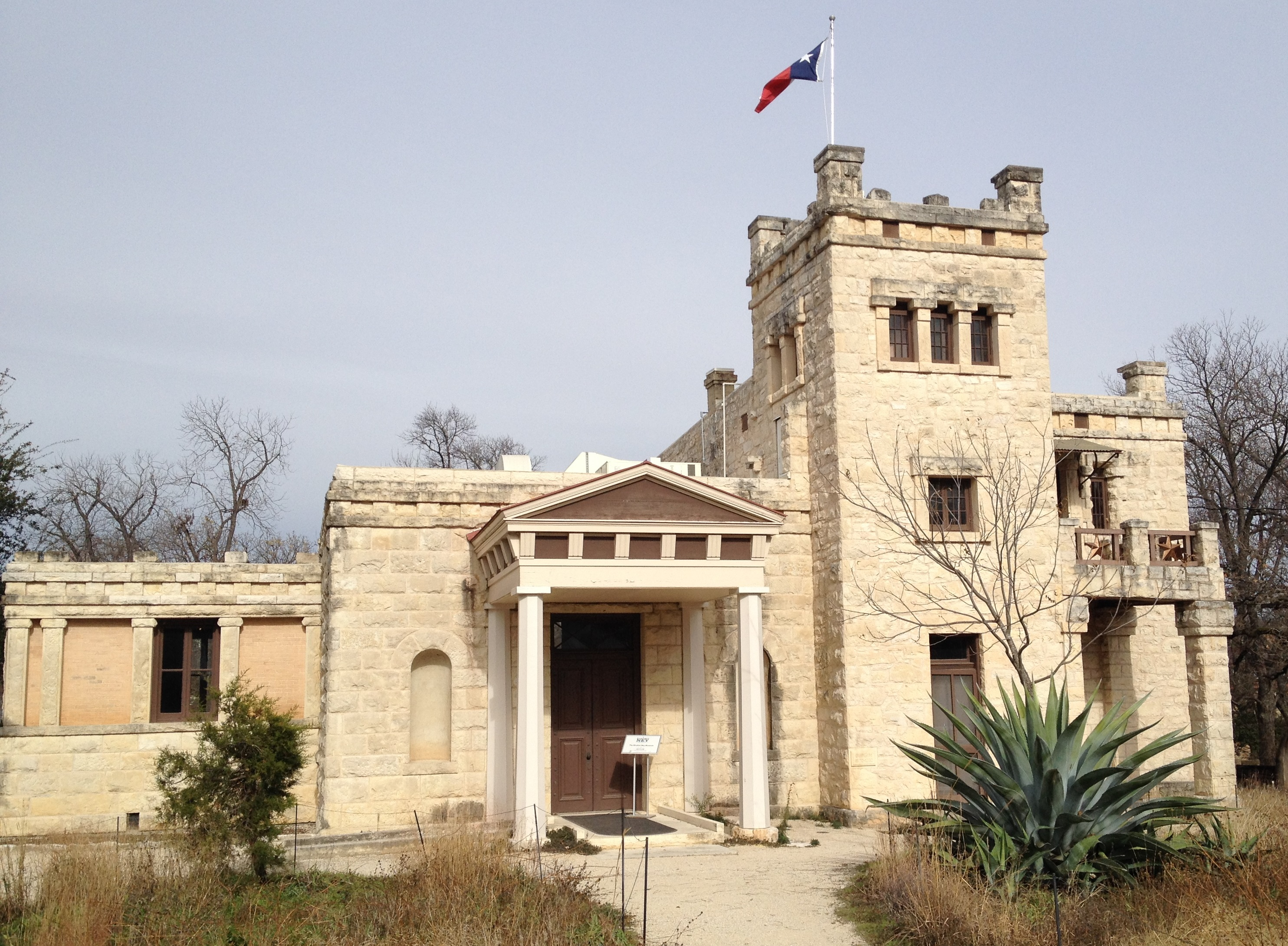
- Location: 304 E. 44th St; Austin, Texas, United States
- Coordinates: 30°18′24″N 97°43′35″W
- Area: 2.6 acres (1.1 ha)
- Built: 1892
- Architect: Elisabet Ney
- Architectural style: Classical revival
- NRHP reference No.: 72001374
- RTHL No.: 13829
- TSAL No.: 624

Significant dates
- Added to NRHP: November 29, 1972
- Designated RTHL: 1962
- Designated TSAL: May 28, 1981

The Elisabet Ney Museum is a museum located in Austin, Texas, United States. It is housed in the former studio of sculptor Elisabet Ney and is dedicated to showcasing her life and works. There is a permanent collection of her portrait busts and personal memorabilia on display.

== History ==
Formosa, as Ney called the studio, was completed in 1893 and enlarged in 1902. It was the earliest art studio built in Texas. After Ney died in 1907, Ella and Joseph B. Dibrell purchased the building to preserve it as an art center in memory of her. Ella Dibrell along with other women helped form the Texas Fine Arts Association to create the museum. The City of Austin assumed ownership of it in 1941 and it is managed through the city's Parks and Recreation Department. In addition to being a local and state historic landmark, it was added to the National Register of Historic Places on November 29, 1972, and is one of the 40 museums in the Historic Artists' Homes and Studios program.

Until 1973 the Elisabet Ney Museum emphasized the exhibition of contemporary art. From July 1980 to November 1982, the museum was closed for restoration and the installation of a climate-control system, after which the museum began to reconstruct the studio as it was used by Ney.

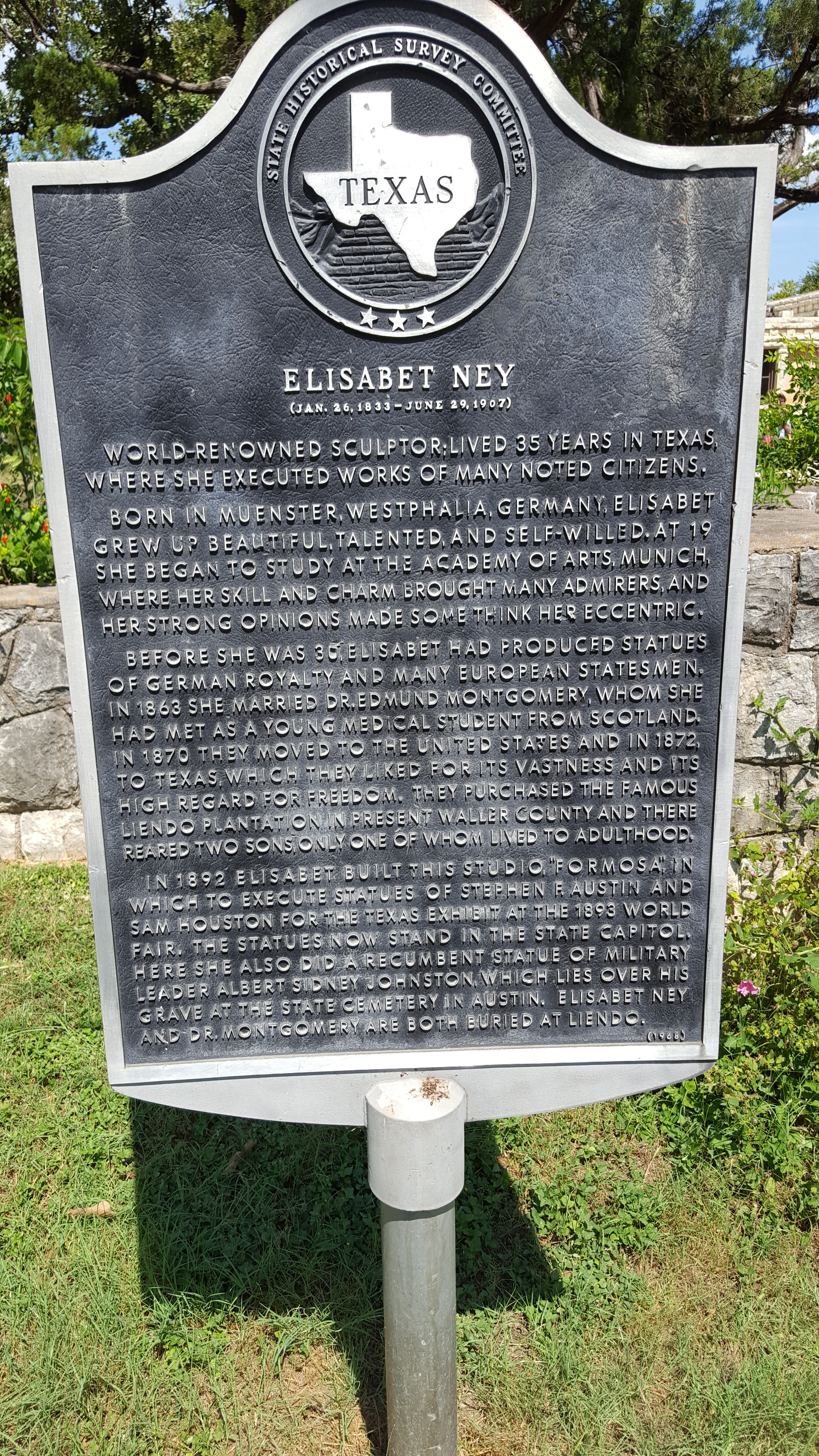
Historic Marker, Elisabet Ney Studio Built 1892

In 2007 the museum commissioned a master plan for restoration of the grounds. Part of this plan has been completed, including planting wild flowers and prairie grasses around the building to better resemble the appearance of the grounds in Ney's time.

In 2017 the city of Austin announced a planned restoration of the museum's frame, windows, and doors to improve the building's climate control and a restoration of the property's historic wall and gate. Other planned improvements include a new bridge across Waller Creek, which cuts through the Ney property, and the formation of a supporters group, Friends of the Ney. Recently, the museum has again returned to a focus on contemporary art and artists, particularly women and non-binary artists, and holds numerous public events and art exhibitions annually.

In December 2024, the museum closed to the public for renovation, including restoration of original doors and windows, upgrades to HVAC, roof repairs, and installation of a new pedestrian bridge across Waller Creek.

== Collection ==
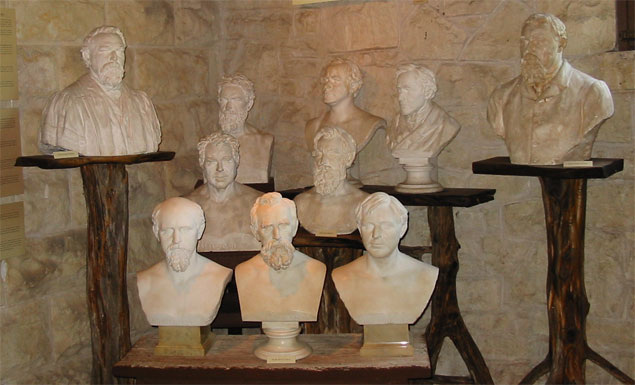
Busts on display inside the museum

The museum houses a collection of originals and replicas of Ney's works, along with many of her personal belongings and tools. The more than fifty busts, medallions, and full-sized figures on display include her portraits of European notables such as King Ludwig II of Bavaria, Otto von Bismarck, Giuseppe Garibaldi, and Arthur Schopenhauer as well as Americans William Jennings Bryan, Sam Houston, Stephen F. Austin, and General Albert Sidney Johnston.

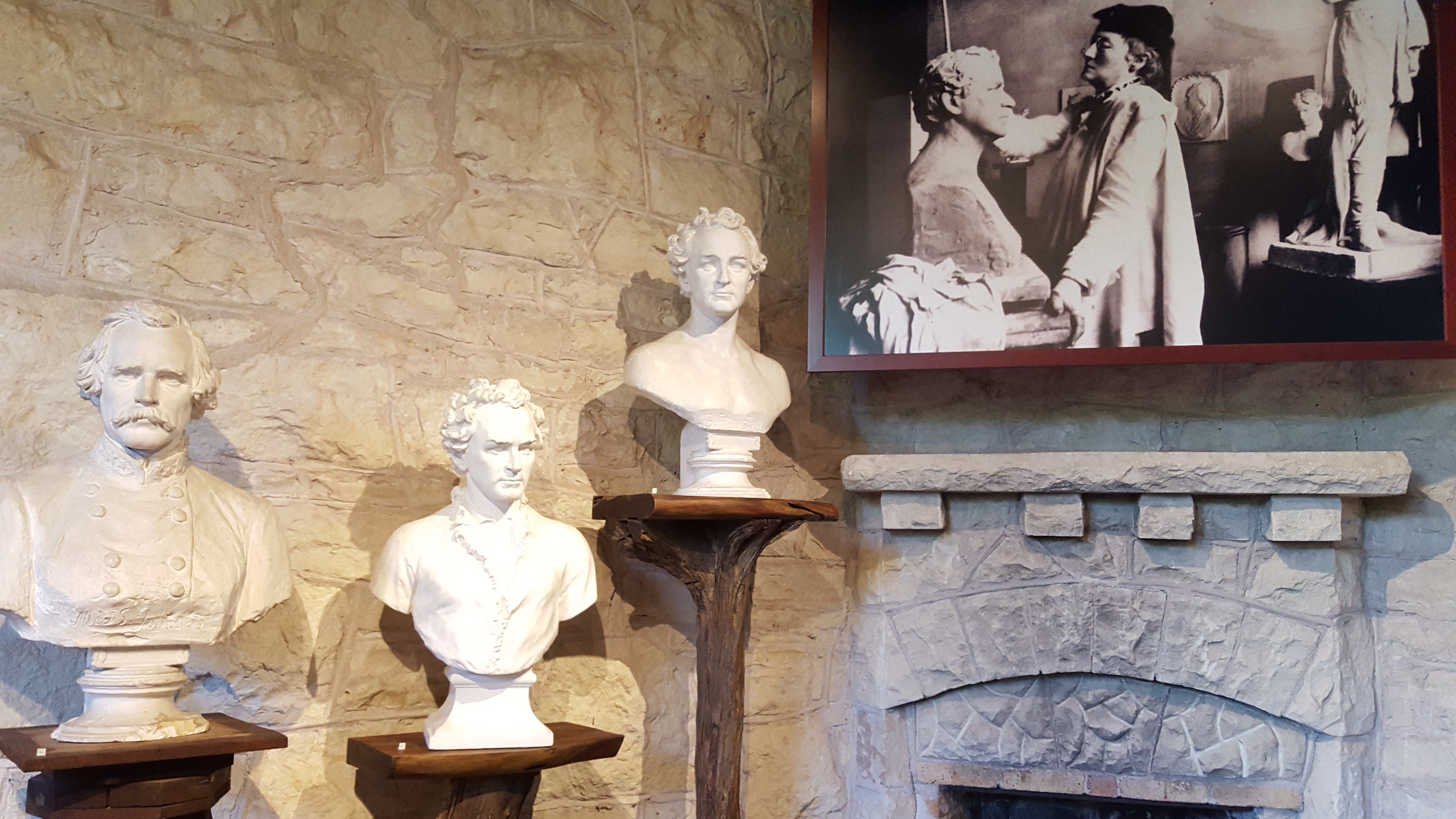
Interior, Elisabet Ney Studio and Sculptures

== See also ==
- List of single-artist museums
