= Frank Reaugh =

American artist

Charles Franklin "Frank" Reaugh
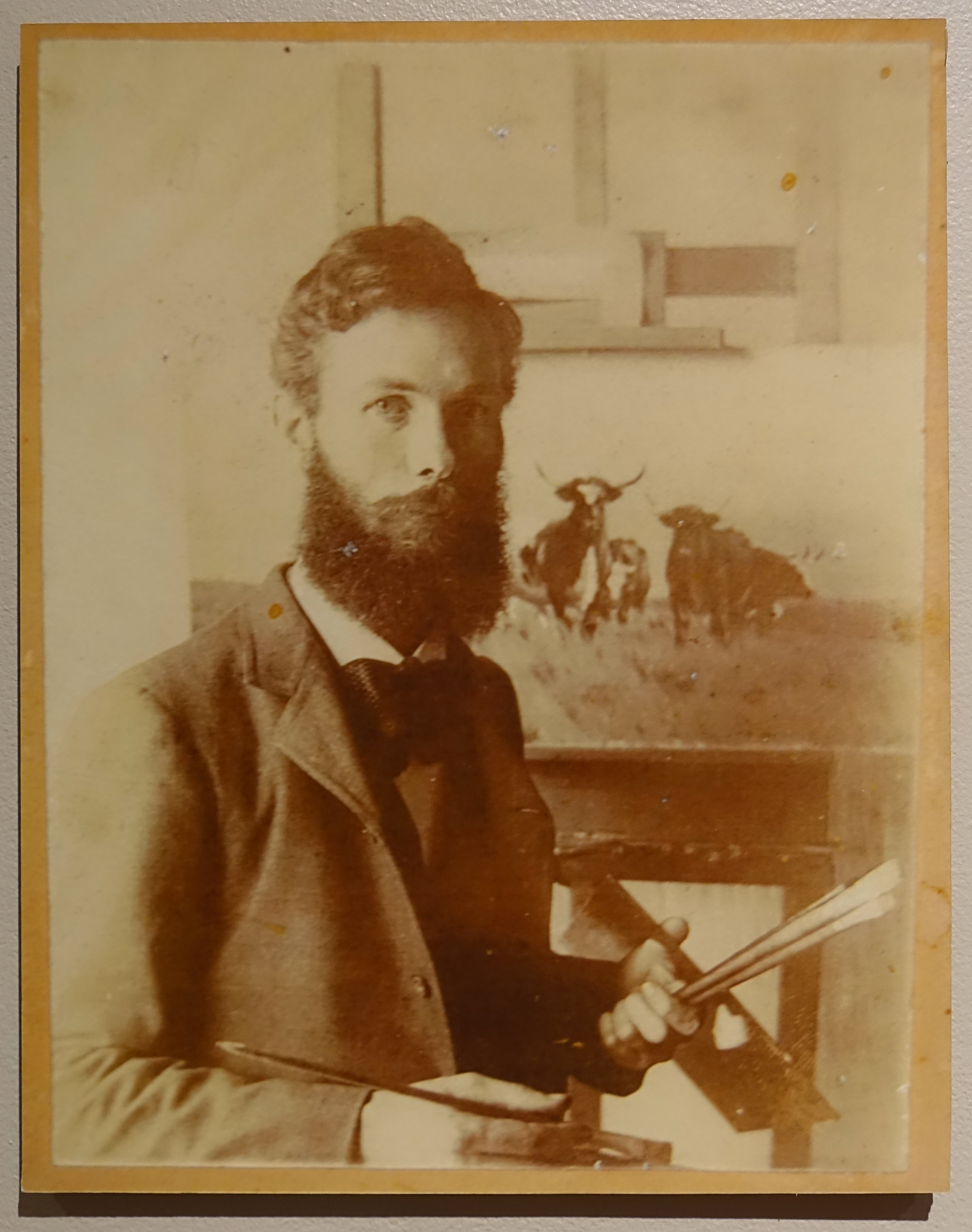
- Frank Reaugh
- Born: December 29, 1860; Jacksonville, Morgan County, Illinois, USA
- Died: May 6, 1945 (aged 84); Dallas, Texas
- Occupations: Artist; Photography, Inventor; "Dean of Texas Painters"
- Spouse(s): Never married (1) As a youth, Reaugh went on cattle drives that awakened his interest in the region. (2) Many of Reaugh's paintings are held by the Panhandle-Plains Historical Museum in Canyon. (3) Based in Dallas, Reaugh took field trips to the American Southwest for inspiration for his paintings.

Charles Franklin Reaugh (December 29, 1860 – May 6, 1945), known as Frank Reaugh, was an American artist, photographer, inventor, patron of the arts, and teacher, who was called the "Dean of Texas Painters". Born and raised in Illinois, he moved as a youth with his family to Texas. There he developed an art career devoted to portraying Texas Longhorns, and the animals and landscapes of the vast regions of the Great Plains and the American Southwest. He worked in both pastels and oil paints and was a prolific artist, producing more than 7,000 known works. He was active in the Society of Western Artists.

== Early years ==
Reaugh was born in 1860 near Jacksonville, the seat of Morgan County in west central Illinois, to George Washington Reaugh, who had worked as a miner in the California gold rush, and the former Clarinda Morton Spilman. Reaugh (pronounced RAY), moved with his parents and family in 1876 to Terrell in Kaufman County east of Dallas. The original family name was "Castelreaugh", but his Irish immigrant ancestors had shortened it to "Reaugh" when they entered the United States. The Reaughs initially made their living in Terrell by cultivating cotton, still a major commodity crop in East Texas. Reaugh was inspired by these drives: riding horseback next to a huge herd of cattle, seeing wild birds and animals, and traveling through a wide variety of landscapes.

== Art education and career ==
During the winter of 1884–1885, Reaugh studied at the St. Louis School of Fine Arts in St. Louis, Missouri. In 1888 he sailed to France, where for the next year he studied at the Académie Julian in Paris. Here he became interested in pastels at The Louvre museum.

== Prolific painter ==
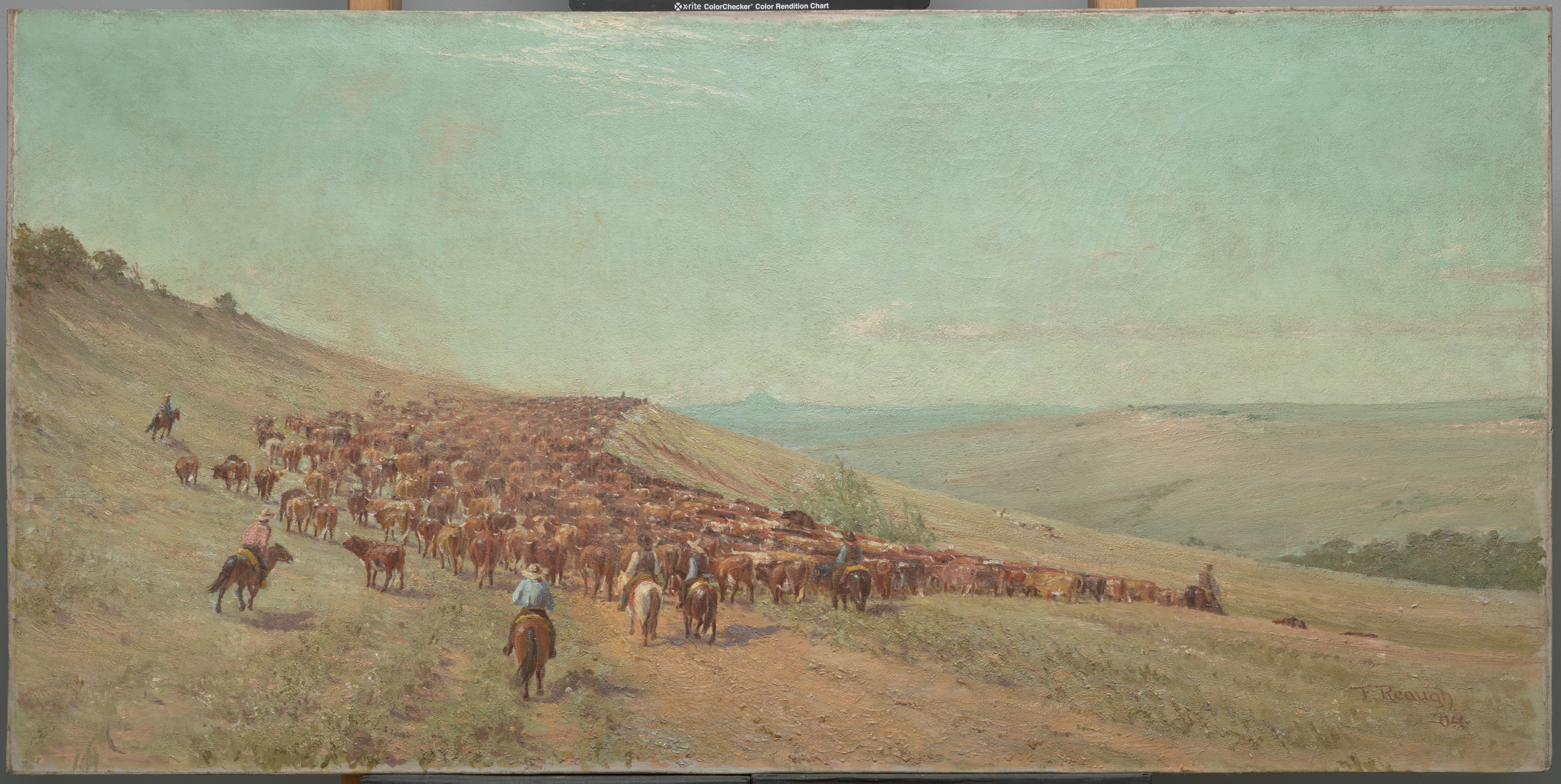
Driving the Herd

In total, Reaugh created more than seven thousand works. He concentrated on small plein air pastel sketches of the iconic Texas Longhorn, a subject he found challenging to portray. He once said that "no animal on earth has the beauty of the Texas steer."

His best-known paintings include:

- Watering the Herd (1889)
- The O Roundup (1894)
- Grazing the Herd (1897)
- The Approaching Herd (1902)
- Twenty-Four Hours with the Herd (seven paintings, after 1930)
- Texas Cattle (April 1933, his last major work)

== Inventor ==
Reaugh created his own art materials and tools. He also patented a rotary pump for commercial use. He served on the board of directors for the Limacon Pump Company in Dallas.

== Art instructor ==
Reaugh established an art school in Dallas in 1897. For many years, Reaugh led groups of art students on sketching expeditions throughout West Texas, ranging into New Mexico and Arizona. His colleagues Charles Peter Bock and Louis Oscar Griffith sometimes accompanied him on these trips.

Many of his students, including Reveau Bassett, Florence McClung, Harry Carnohan, Lucretia Donnell, John Douglass, Olin H. Travis, Edward G. Eisenlohr, Lloyd Goff, Alexandre Hogue, and Josephine Oliver, gained regional and national prominence. Several of these became part of the group known as the Dallas Nine.

In 1900, the Dallas Morning News employed Reaugh as a weekly art commentator and reporter. He taught briefly at Baylor University, and gave illustrated lectures in the art department of Texas Christian University.

Reaugh helped found the Dallas Art Society (which later developed as the Dallas Museum of Art), The Frank Reaugh Art Club, and the Striginian Club. Frank Reaugh also championed the creation of the Dallas Museum of Art in the early twentieth century.

== Legacy ==
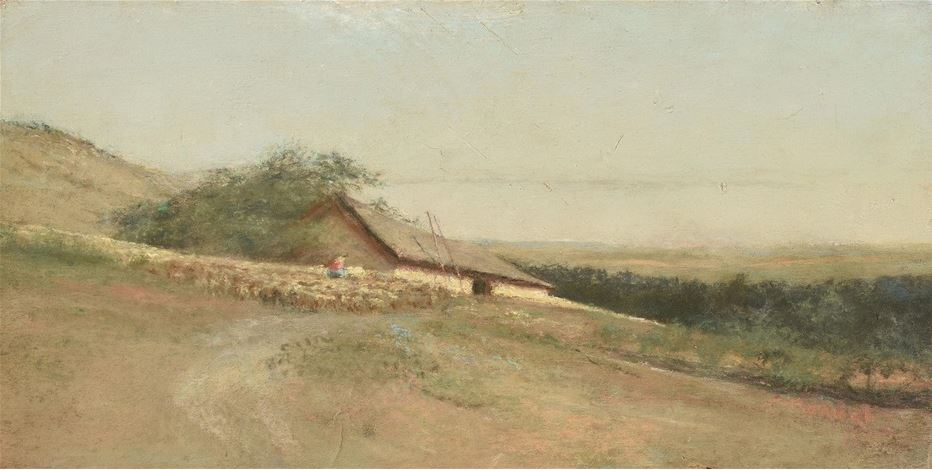
Shepherd with a Herd of Sheep

Several of his paintings are displayed at the Texas State Capitol in Austin. Many of his other works are held by the Panhandle-Plains Historical Museum at West Texas A&M University in Canyon. Fellow painter Harold Dow Bugbee, a former curator of the museum, is also featured there. Other Reaugh works are at the Southwest Collection/Special Library Collection at Texas Tech University in Lubbock, and the Harry Ransom Humanities Research Center at the University of Texas at Austin.

Having given away most of his possessions, Reaugh died in poverty in Dallas in 1945 at the age of eighty-four. He is buried in Terrell Cemetery.

In 2007, the exhibition The Pastel Range: Frank Reaugh, Ranch Historian was shown at the National Ranching Heritage Center in Lubbock, Texas. In 2015, the Harry Ranson Center in Austin, Texas, staged the retrospective exhibit "Frank Reaugh: Landscapes of Texas and the American West" and published the related book, Windows on the West: The Art of Frank Reaugh.

== Sources ==
- Michael R. Grauer. Rounded Up in Glory: Frank Reaugh, Texas Renaissance Man. Denton University of North Texas Press, 2016.
