= Jerry Bywaters =

American painter (1906–1989)

- Born: May 21, 1906; Paris, Texas
- Died: March 7, 1989 (aged 82); Dallas, Texas
- Education: Southern Methodist University
- Known for: Painting, drawing, printmaking, criticism

Williamson Gerald Bywaters (1906–1989), known as Jerry Bywaters, was an American artist, university professor, museum director, art critic and a historian of the Texas region. Based in Dallas, Bywaters worked to elevate the quality of Texas art, attracting national attention.

== Early life and education ==
Bywaters was born in Paris, Texas, on May 21, 1906, and became known as "Jerry" (also spelled Gerry). When a childhood accident kept him out of school for a year, young Jerry found entertainment through drawing. This was his first introduction into his life in art. He attended the Terrill Preparatory School for Boys in Dallas, which he credits with helping "me develop as a writer and later critic". His illustrations appeared in the school paper and annual.

Bywaters enrolled in Southern Methodist University, where he earned a BA in English and Journalism, and another in General Literature. In his last year, he took a painting class from Ralph Rowntree, and in July 1927, traveled to Europe with him to study art. The following February, Bywaters went to Mexico to study the Mexican mural movement and met Diego Rivera. From him he learned that "art, to be significant, must be a reflection of life".

In the summer of 1928 Bywaters continued his study of art at the Old Lyme Art Colony in Connecticut. His ability was recognized by noted American painters Bruce Crane and William S. Robinson. It was then that Bywaters decided to pursue art as a profession. He sought to overcome his father's concerns over his career choice, writing to him that in the long run, he would earn less as a commercial artist than as a creative one.

In the fall Bywaters moved to New York City to attend the Art Students League. There he studied with John Sloan, known for his paintings of urban life. But Sloan advised Bywaters to return to the Southwest, saying there were "a lot of interesting things" he could paint. Bywaters returned to Dallas.

== Artistic career ==
Bywaters produced landscapes, still lifes and portrait paintings, as well as lithographic prints and murals. In 1933 Art Digest recognized Bywaters as an artist of national importance.

His paintings in museum collections include On the Ranch (1941) at the Dallas Museum of Fine Arts; Where the Mountain Meets the Plains, at Southern Methodist University; and Oil Field Girls (1940), at the Blanton Museum, University of Texas at Austin.

In 1935 Bywaters began making prints, using lithography as a way to make art affordable. He hoped to sell more works to middle-class people and to popularize Texas regional art. He pioneered the style later termed "Lone Star Regionalism" and he was recognized as "one of the finest of the regional print makers". An early Bywaters lithograph was Gargantua (1935), which won a prize in the 1935 Allied Arts Exhibition. Another, Ranch Hand and Pony (1938), was exhibited at the 1938 Venice Biennial Exposition which received a prize from the Dallas Print Society in 1941.

Bywaters was a founding member of Lone Star Printmakers, a group of male Texas artists who created original prints. They promoted their works with touring exhibitions from 1938 to 1941. They excluded women from their group, so women artists formed their own group, known as Printmakers Guild, and later as Texas Printmakers.

During the Great Depression and administration of President Franklin D. Roosevelt, Bywaters participated in New Deal art programs. The government had several programs to employ artists, writers, actors and directors. He won mural competitions, set up to commission public art for newly constructed or renovated federal and city buildings. In collaborations with other Dallas artists, Bywaters completed six projects in Texas, including a series of panels in collaboration with Alexandre Hogue at the Old City Hall in Dallas; a series of panels at the Paris Public Library; and one mural each in the post offices of Trinity, Quanah, and Farmersville. Other murals of his were installed at the Parcel Post Building of Houston.

== Professor, critic, and museum director ==
Bywaters served for forty years as a faculty member of Southern Methodist University's Division of Fine Arts. He ran both the Art and Art History departments.

He was art director of the Dallas Museum of Fine Arts for more than two decades, from 1943 to 1964. Unlike many of his contemporary art directors, Bywaters sought to bring people into the museum, foreseeing that increasing attendance was the key to survival and growth. For example, in 1954 he staged the two-week 'Fabulous West' event, which attracted 131,000 people. During his tenure as director of DMFA, Bywaters produced ambitious exhibitions. Among the most notable were Religious Art of the Western World (1958) and The Arts of Man (1962).

When city support for the museum was threatened during the Red Scare of the 1950s by accusations that the museum was exhibiting works by communist artists, Bywaters and the trustees of the Dallas Art Association held fast to the standard of freedom of expression and professionalism.

Bywaters was the art critic for The Dallas Morning News from 1933 to 1939, during which time he wrote hundreds of articles on the art and artists of Texas. He was seen as fair, pointing out merits, and allowing shortcomings to be revealed by comparison. As editor of Southwestern Arts and art critic for the Dallas newspaper, Bywaters was recognized as the leading spokesman in the city of Texas regionalism. He was prominent among the circle of artist known as the 'Dallas Nine', or the 'Lone Star Regionalist'.

== Legacy ==
In 1981, Bywaters gave his numerous papers on the art and artists of the region to Southern Methodist University, founding the Bywaters Special Collections

Bywaters lived in Dallas with his wife Mary McLarry Bywaters until his death on March 7, 1989.
