= Lady Macbeth (sculpture) =

Sculpture of Lady Macbeth by Elisabet Ney

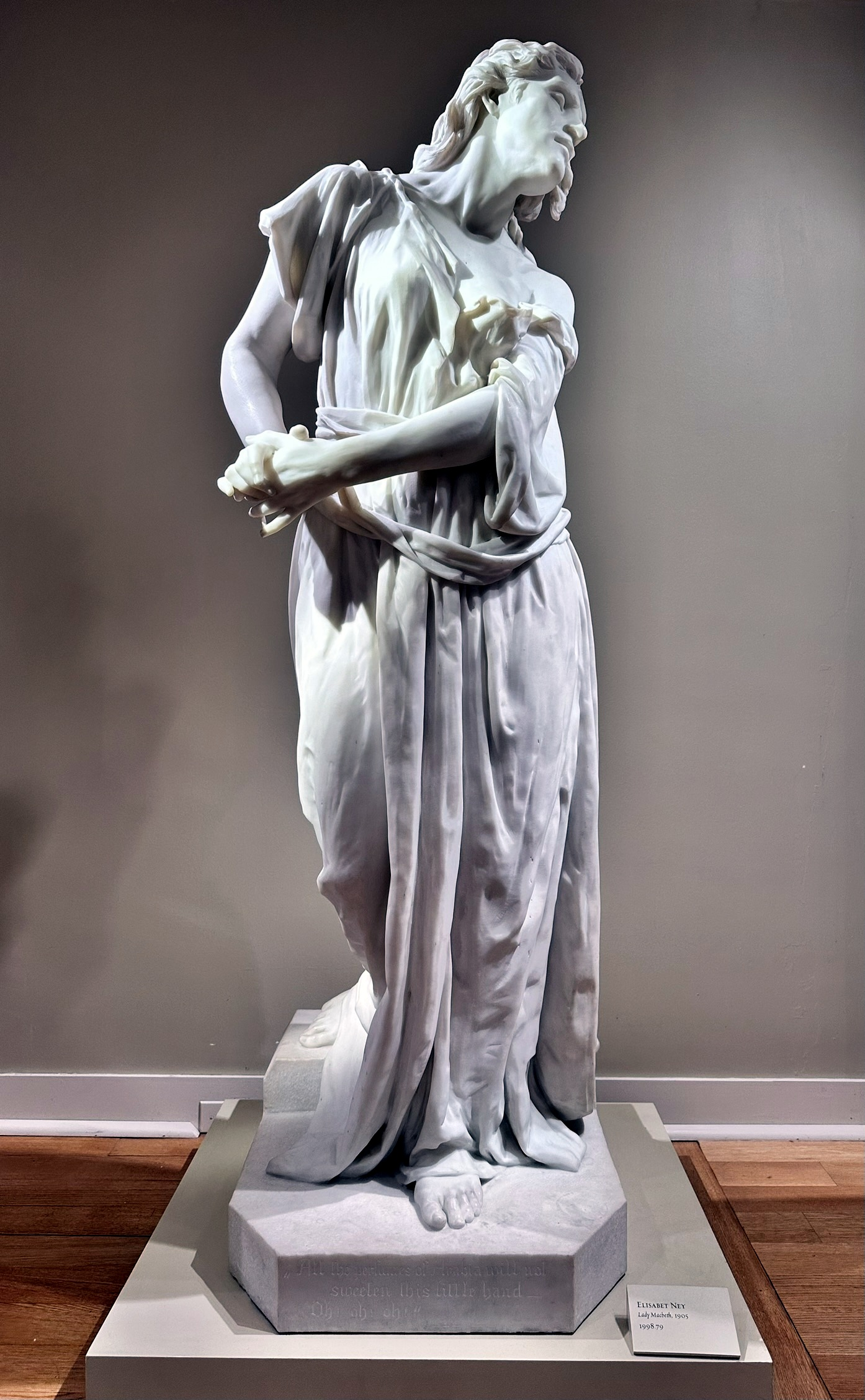
- Lady Macbeth by Elisabet Ney, on display in the Smithsonian American Art Museum, Washington, D.C.
- Artist: Elisabet Ney
- Year: 1905
- Medium: Marble
- Subject: Lady Macbeth
- Dimensions: 187.2 cm × 65.4 cm × 75.0 cm (73.75 in × 25.75 in × 29.5 in)
- Location: Smithsonian American Art Museum, Washington, D.C., United States
- Accession: 1998.79

Lady Macbeth is a statue of the Shakespearean character Lady Macbeth by German American sculptor Elisabet Ney. The sculpture is a life-size full-length female figure rendered in marble. Completed in 1905, Lady Macbeth is one of Ney's last works and was regarded by the artist as her masterpiece. It is housed in Washington, D.C., in the Luce Foundation Center for American Art at the Smithsonian American Art Museum, which acquired the piece in 1998.

== History ==
Ney began sculpting Lady Macbeth in 1903, shortly after she completed the design of her memorial statue of Albert Sidney Johnston. Unlike Ney's other major contemporary works, the statue was not made in response to any commission or for any particular buyer. She developed the piece in her studio in Austin, Texas, Formosa (now the Elisabet Ney Museum), where the plaster model is still on display. The piece was cut in marble in Italy beginning in 1903, alongside second copies of Ney's portraits of Sam Houston and Stephen F. Austin for submission to the National Statuary Hall Collection. Lady Macbeth was completed in 1905, two years before Ney's death; it proved to be her last major work.

== Design and interpretation ==
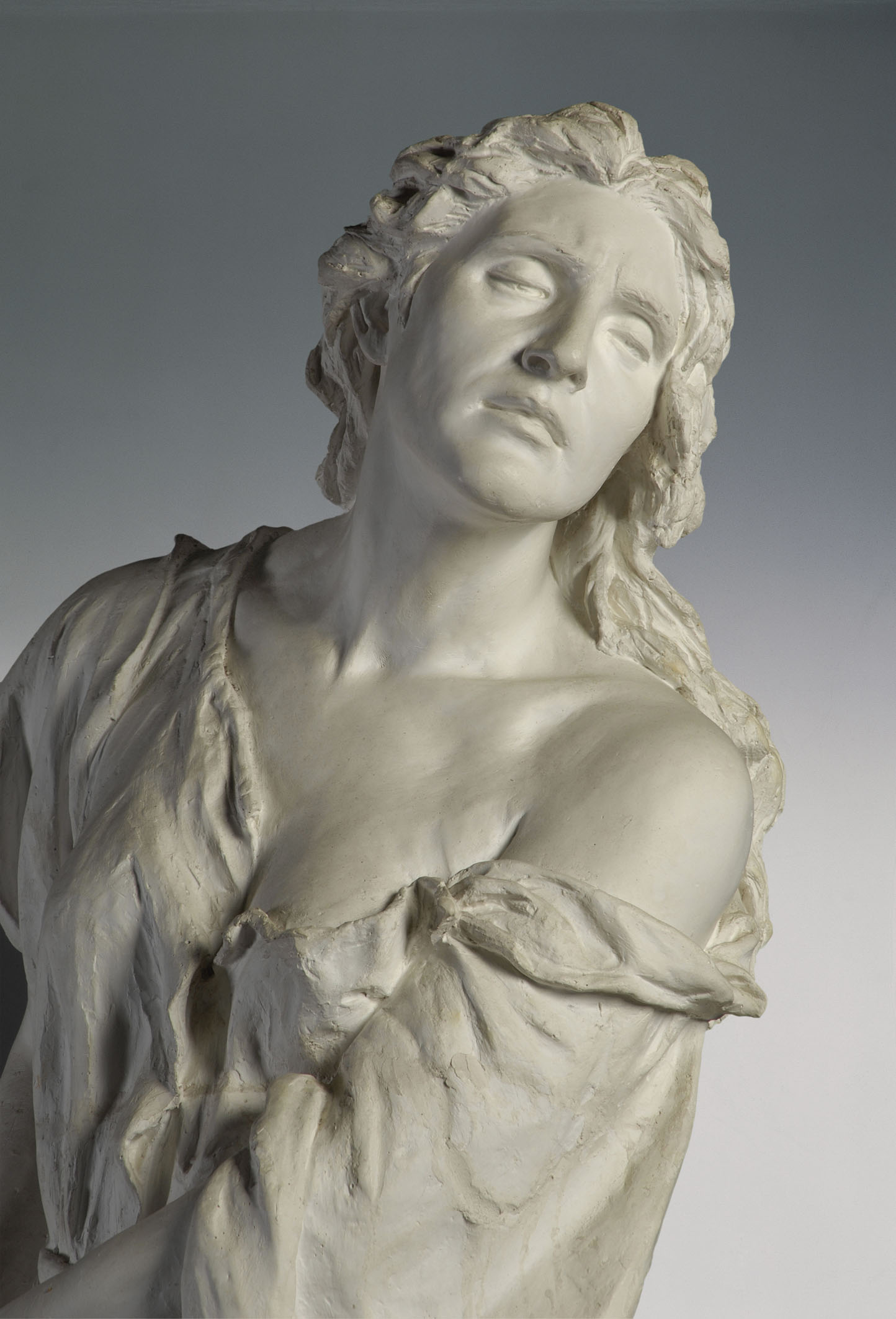
Detail of Lady Macbeth

The sculpture interprets the sleepwalking scene in act 5, scene 1 of Shakespeare's tragedy Macbeth. Lady Macbeth is depicted sleepwalking barefoot in a flowing nightgown, her eyes half closed, with her left arm reaching across her body to clutch her right hand. Her face is uplifted and turned away from her clenched hands; her facial expression is pained, and her body is twisted by the pose of the head and arms.

The piece stands out among Ney's works, most of which were portraits of living persons or historical figures; she produced few other works on fictitious or allegorical subjects. With its exploration of subjective emotion, this work also represents a shift toward romanticism and away from the neoclassical sculpture more characteristic of Ney's work generally.

Lady Macbeth has been understood both as a portrayal of a fictional character and as a self-portrait; the figure's face resembles the artist's own, and Ney wrote in 1903 that the piece was a result and expression of her own feelings of "cruel disappointment" in life. The statue's evocation of grief has been interpreted as a reference to a frustrated romance earlier in Ney's life (perhaps with King Ludwig II of Bavaria), or to her participation in political intrigues in 1860s Germany, as well as to her estrangement from her son.
