= Statue of Albert Sidney Johnston (Texas State Cemetery) =

Sculpture of Albert Sidney Johnston by Elisabet Ney in Austin, Texas, U.S.

Albert Sidney Johnston
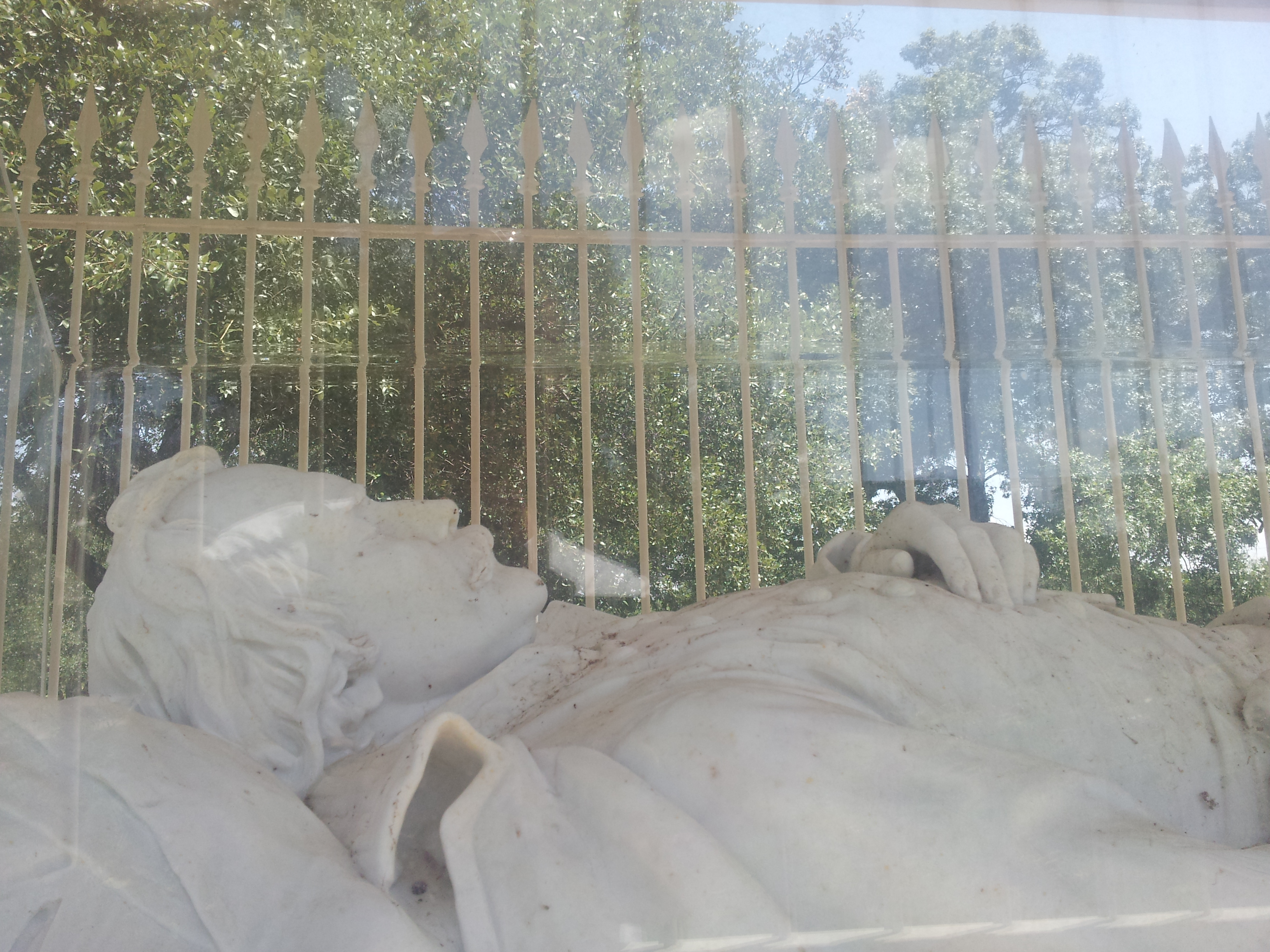
- Detail of the statue
- Artist: Elisabet Ney
- Year: 1903
- Medium: Marble sculpture
- Subject: Albert Sidney Johnston
- Location: Texas State Cemetery; Austin, Texas, United States; 30.2652°N 97.7266°W

Albert Sidney Johnston is a memorial statue of General Albert Sidney Johnston by German American sculptor Elisabet Ney. The piece is a life-size recumbent male figure rendered in marble sculpture. It depicts the General at the time of his death in the Battle of Shiloh during the American Civil War. Completed in 1903, the piece resides atop Johnston's tomb in the Texas State Cemetery in Austin, Texas, installed there in 1905.

== History ==
After his death in 1862, Albert Sidney Johnston was first buried in New Orleans; once the Civil War had ended, the Texas Legislature had his body reinterred in the Texas State Cemetery in 1867. In 1901, the Texas Division of the United Daughters of the Confederacy brought a bill before the state legislature that appropriated $10,000 for a memorial to be placed over Johnston's grave. Governor Joseph D. Sayers gave the commission to Austin, Texas, sculptor Elisabet Ney, whose statues of Stephen F. Austin and Sam Houston had recently been approved for installation in the Texas State Capitol.

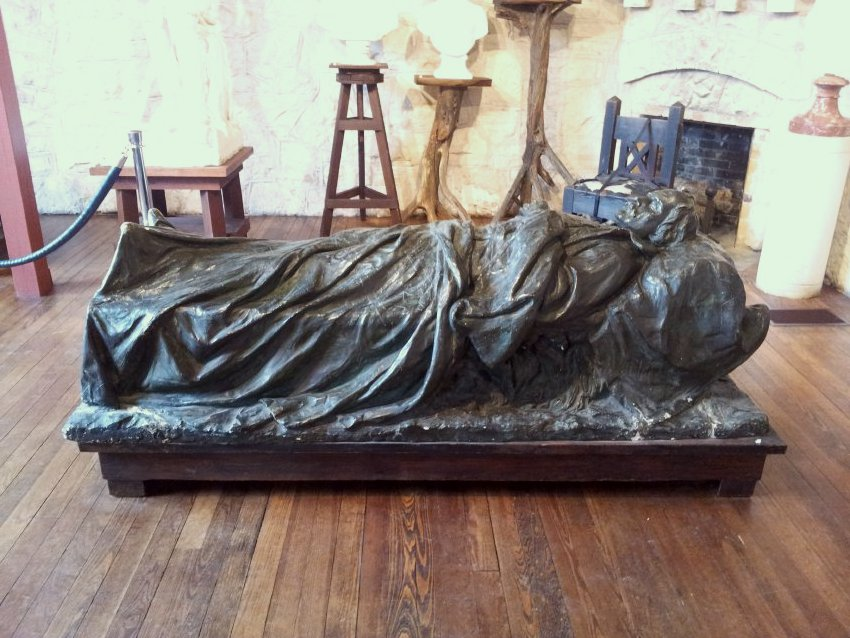
Albert Sidney Johnston plaster model at the Elisabet Ney Museum in Austin, Texas.

Ney developed the work between 1902 and 1903 in her Austin studio, Formosa (now the Elisabet Ney Museum), where the plaster model is still on display. The final marble version was cut in 1904 in Seravezza, Italy, together with copies of Ney's statues of Austin and Houston intended for the National Statuary Hall Collection in Washington, D.C. After being shipped to the United States, Johnston was displayed in the Texas building at the 1904 St. Louis World's Fair, where it won a bronze medal. It was then permanently installed at Johnston's tomb in Austin in 1905.

== Design and interpretation ==
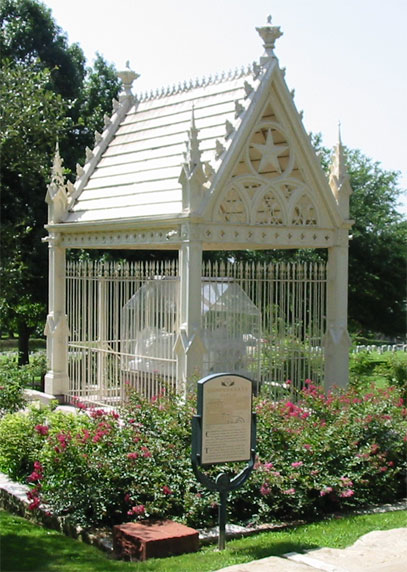
Johnston's tomb, with Ney's statue and iron enclosure in the Texas State Cemetery

The statue depicts Johnston lying on a stretcher at the time of his death during the Battle of Shiloh. The figure is recumbent, dressed in the formal military uniform of a Confederate General. Johnston's eyes are closed, and his left arm is folded across his chest, while his right lies alongside him. The statue's legs are draped in a Confederate "Southern cross" battle flag, which hangs from a broken staff. The statue is protected from the elements by a plexiglas dome, which is then surrounded by a cream-colored wrought-iron enclosure with Gothic revival decorative elements (also designed by Ney).

In designing Johnston, Ney aimed for a realistic effect, emphasizing naturalistic details in her composition. The sculpture includes the rough wooden litter and folded cloths on which the dying Johnston is meant to have been carried from the battle. During the work's development, representatives of the Daughters of the Confederacy pressed Ney to include more symbolic or allegorical elements, but Ney refused, insisting upon a scene which could in fact have occurred on the Shiloh battlefield. She did, however, intend the broken flagstaff to poetically suggest that the Confederacy's hopes of victory had been destroyed by Johnston's death.

Ney designed the statue's enclosure with open ironwork bars and railings so that the tomb and statue would be visible from all sides without visitors having to enter the mausoleum. She included Gothic elements (such as pinnacles on the roofline, tracery on the gables, and crocket capitals on the corner columns) to give the site a solemn and religious quality. Ney also incorporated Texas lone stars into the Gothic tracery to mark Johnston's grave as a commemoration of a notable Texan.
