= Giuseppe Garibaldi (disambiguation) =

Giuseppe Garibaldi (1807–1882) was a revolutionary and a father of modern Italy.

Giuseppe Garibaldi may also refer to:

- Giuseppe Garibaldi (composer) (1819–1908), Italian composer and organist
- Giuseppe Garibaldi (Ney), a sculpture by Elisabet Ney
- Statue of Giuseppe Garibaldi (New York City), a sculpture by Giovanni Turini
- Italian cruiser Giuseppe Garibaldi (1899), sunk in 1915
- Italian cruiser Giuseppe Garibaldi (1936), converted in 1961 into a guided missile cruiser, ultimately decommissioned in 1971 and scrapped 1972
- Italian aircraft carrier Giuseppe Garibaldi (551), commissioned by Italy 1985, decommissioned by Italy 2024, transferred to Indonesian Navy 2026
- Giuseppe Garibaldi Trophy, a rugby union trophy awarded to the winner of the annual Six Nations Championship match between France and Italy

== See also ==
- Giuseppe Garibaldi II (1879–1950), Italian soldier, grandson of Giuseppe Garibaldi
- Giuseppe Gariboldi (1833–1905), Italian flautist
