= Bust of Arthur Schopenhauer =

Sculpture of Schopenhauer by Elisabet Ney

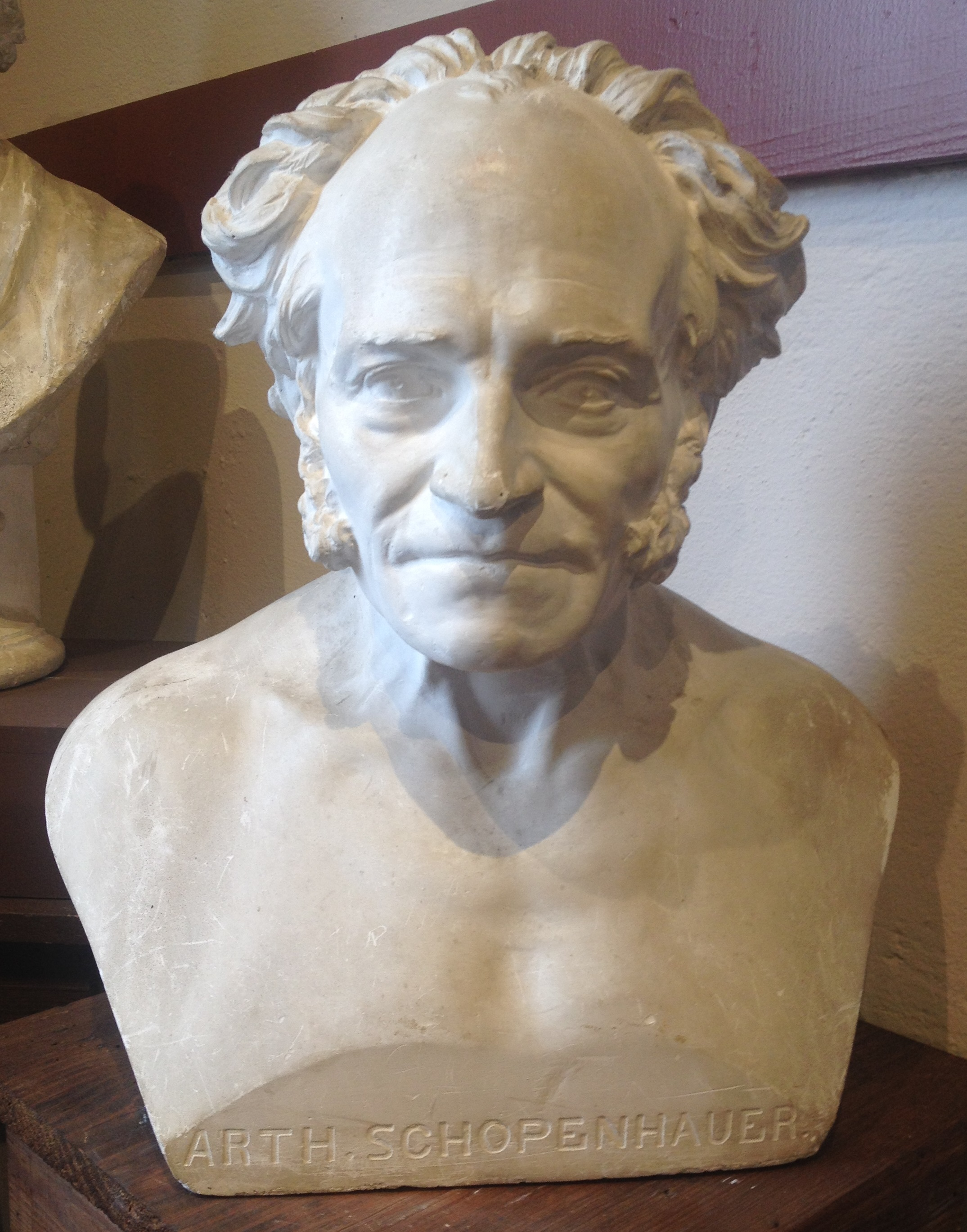
- Bust on display in the Elisabet Ney Museum in Austin, Texas
- Artist: Elisabet Ney
- Year: 1859
- Medium: Marble sculpture
- Subject: Arthur Schopenhauer
- Location: Elisabet Ney Museum, Austin, Texas, United States

Arthur Schopenhauer is a sculpture of German philosopher Arthur Schopenhauer by sculptor Elisabet Ney. Completed in 1859, the piece is a portrait bust rendered in marble. The bust was modeled and carved in Germany, but it is now held by the Elisabet Ney Museum in Austin, Texas, United States.

== History ==
As a young artist in Berlin, Elisabet Ney had sculpted various luminaries of the city, including Jacob Grimm, Cosima Liszt, and Alexander von Humboldt. Ney had been patronized by the naturalist Humboldt, sculptor Christian Rauch, and diplomat Varnhagen von Ense; when all three died between late 1857 and mid 1859, she decided to travel Germany in search of new notable subjects.

In the autumn of 1859, she went to Frankfurt to make a sculpture of prominent philosopher Arthur Schopenhauer. Ney called on Schopenhauer uninvited and unannounced, and at first he refused to be her model. Nonetheless, she soon persuaded him to sit for her, and the two developed a friendship as she composed the portrait.

After finishing the portrait in clay, Ney returned to her studio in Berlin to render the piece in marble later in 1859. In the year after its completion, the marble was shown in Frankfurt, Berlin, and Leipzig (where Schopenhauer's publisher was located); Ney also showed the work at the Paris Salon of 1861, together with her portrait bust of Eilhard Mitscherlich. The piece is now owned by the Elisabet Ney Museum in Austin, Texas, where Ney moved later in life.

== Design and reception ==
Schopenhauer depicts its subject at age seventy-one, a year before his death. The bust prominently features Schopenhauer's much-caricatured bald crown, unruly hair and shaggy sideburns. The figure is unclothed, showing the subject's bare shoulders and upper chest. The eyes are lightly incised, and the head is slightly tilted, with an ambiguous expression; these details make the portrait more personal than Ney's earlier, more strictly neoclassical works.

Schopenhauer was considered to be a good likeness of its subject, if flattering. The work was well received by critics, and also by Schopenhauer himself, who had been deeply displeased with his own earlier portraits in painting and photography. The success of the piece contributed to Ney's commission for her next major work, a bust of King George V of Hanover.
