= Ludwig II (sculpture) =

Sculpture of Ludwig by Elisabet Ney

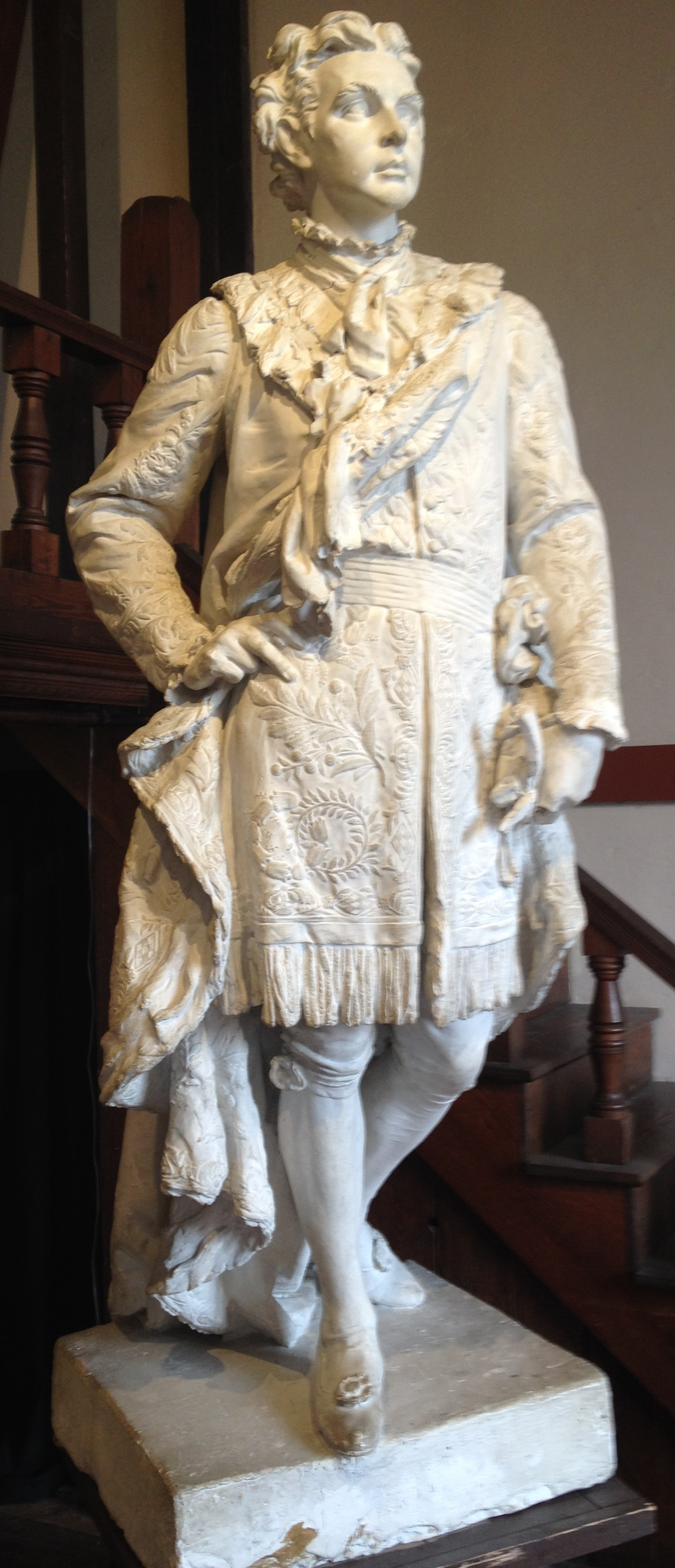
- Statue on display in the Elisabet Ney Museum in Austin, Texas
- Artist: Elisabet Ney
- Year: 1870
- Medium: Plaster
- Subject: Ludwig II of Bavaria
- Dimensions: 210 cm (82 in)
- Location: Elisabet Ney Museum, Austin, Texas

Ludwig II is a sculpture of King Ludwig II of Bavaria by sculptor Elisabet Ney. Completed in 1870, the piece is a portrait statue rendered in plaster. The statue was modeled and carved in Germany, but it is now held by the Elisabet Ney Museum in Austin, Texas; a marble version, completed by another sculptor, is installed in the Herrenchiemsee Palace in Bavaria.

== History ==
As a young woman, Elisabet Ney had studied sculpture at the Academy of Fine Arts in Munich, becoming the Academy's first female graduate in 1854. She next returned to the city in 1867, when she began seeking an opportunity to sculpt a portrait of the King of Bavaria, Ludwig II. Some historians have speculated that Ney's move to Munich and her pursuit of Ludwig were related to the contemporary politics of German Unification, and that Ney may even have been acting as an agent of Prussian Chancellor Otto von Bismarck (whose portrait Ney had recently completed) to persuade King Ludwig to cooperate in the establishment of the German Empire; others, however, conclude that she was simply returning to a familiar city with a thriving artistic scene and a monarch who was known for his generous patronage of the arts.

Ney submitted a pencil sketch of her proposal to the King in September 1868, and Ludwig agreed to the portrait later that fall. Some months passed before the King could be persuaded to sit for Ney; the composition of a preliminary bust began in February 1869, though Ney had not completed her design before Ludwig suspended their audiences indefinitely. The King is said to have been taken aback by the forwardness of Ney's manners and her study and measurement of his person. After Ludwig postponed the composition, Ney left to spend some months traveling with her husband in Italy and Egypt.

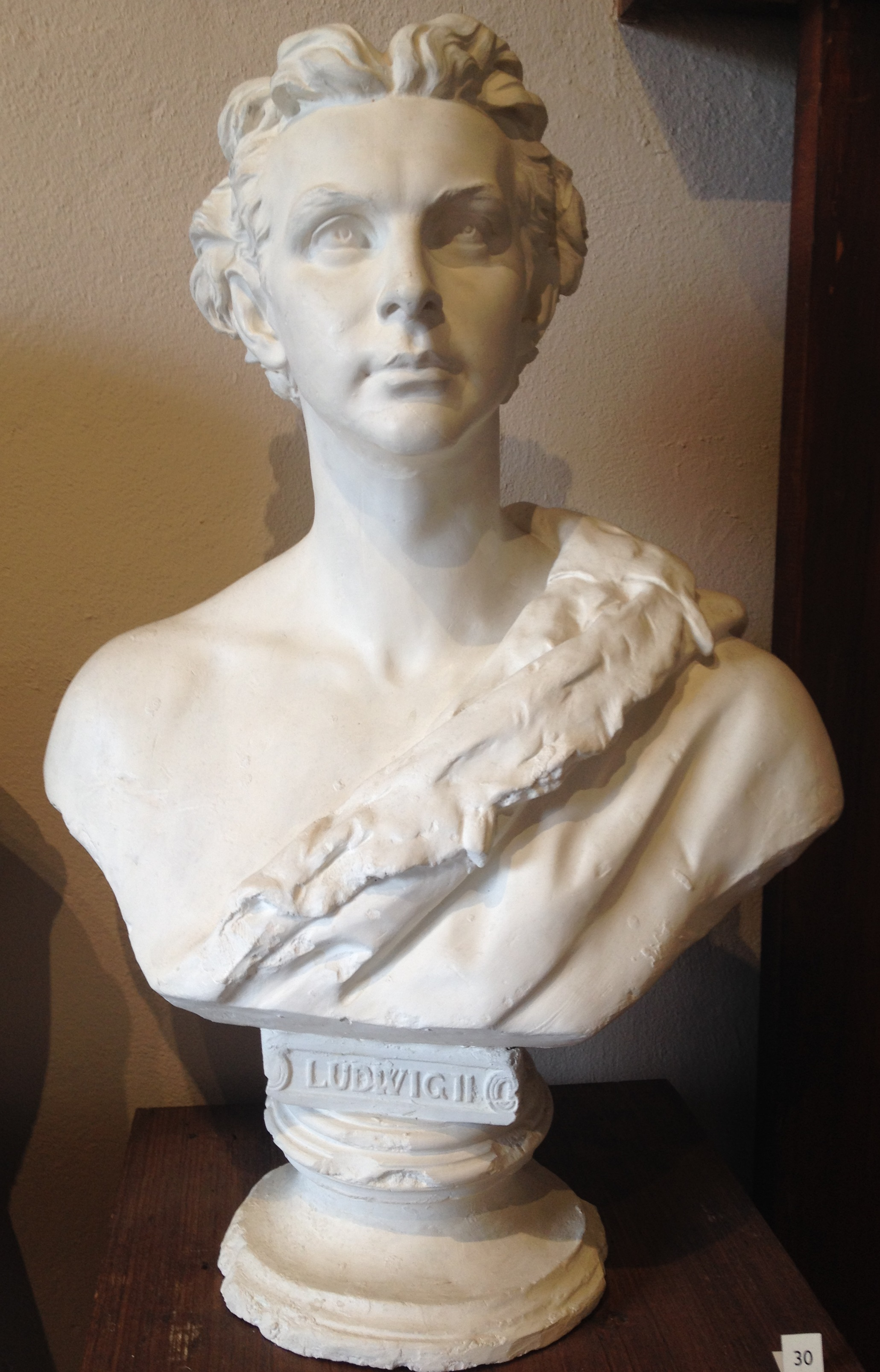
Preliminary bust of Ludwig II by Ney, made in preparation for the full-length statue, on display in the Elisabet Ney Museum

That autumn, she returned to Munich and resumed her work, with the King again agreeing to sit for her composition. As they worked together during this time, the two seem to have grown friendly and held lengthy discussions on both personal and political topics while the sculptor worked. The composition of the full-length statue continued through the fall of 1869 and into the next year; Ney completed a plaster version of the statue by November 1870.

In January 1871, before she could cut a final marble version of the portrait, Ney emigrated from Europe to the United States and left the plaster statue behind; a marble version was later produced by another sculptor in the 1890s and installed in the late King Ludwig's Linderhof Palace, later relocated to the unfinished northern staircase of Herrenchiemsee Palace. Ney subsequently returned to Germany and collected the plaster, which she brought back to her studio in Austin, Texas, where it is currently on display in the Elisabet Ney Museum.

== Design ==
Ludwig II is a full-length portrait statue, 82 inches (210 cm) high, rendered in plaster. Its subject is depicted walking, legs in mid-stride with the right foot forward. The left hand holds the sword hanging from the figure's belt, while the right hand rests on the right hip. The curling hair is swept back from the forehead, and the figure's facial expression is stern and intent, with the face slightly upturned and the eyes wide.

Ludwig appears wearing the collar and cross of the Order of Saint Hubert, and dressed in the elaborate costume of the Order of Saint George, of both of which the King was hereditary Grand Master; the fringed ceremonial coat and trailing cape are depicted in great detail, with brocade and embroidery engraved upon the statue in low relief.
