= Bust of Jacob Grimm =

Sculpture of Grimm by Elisabet Ney

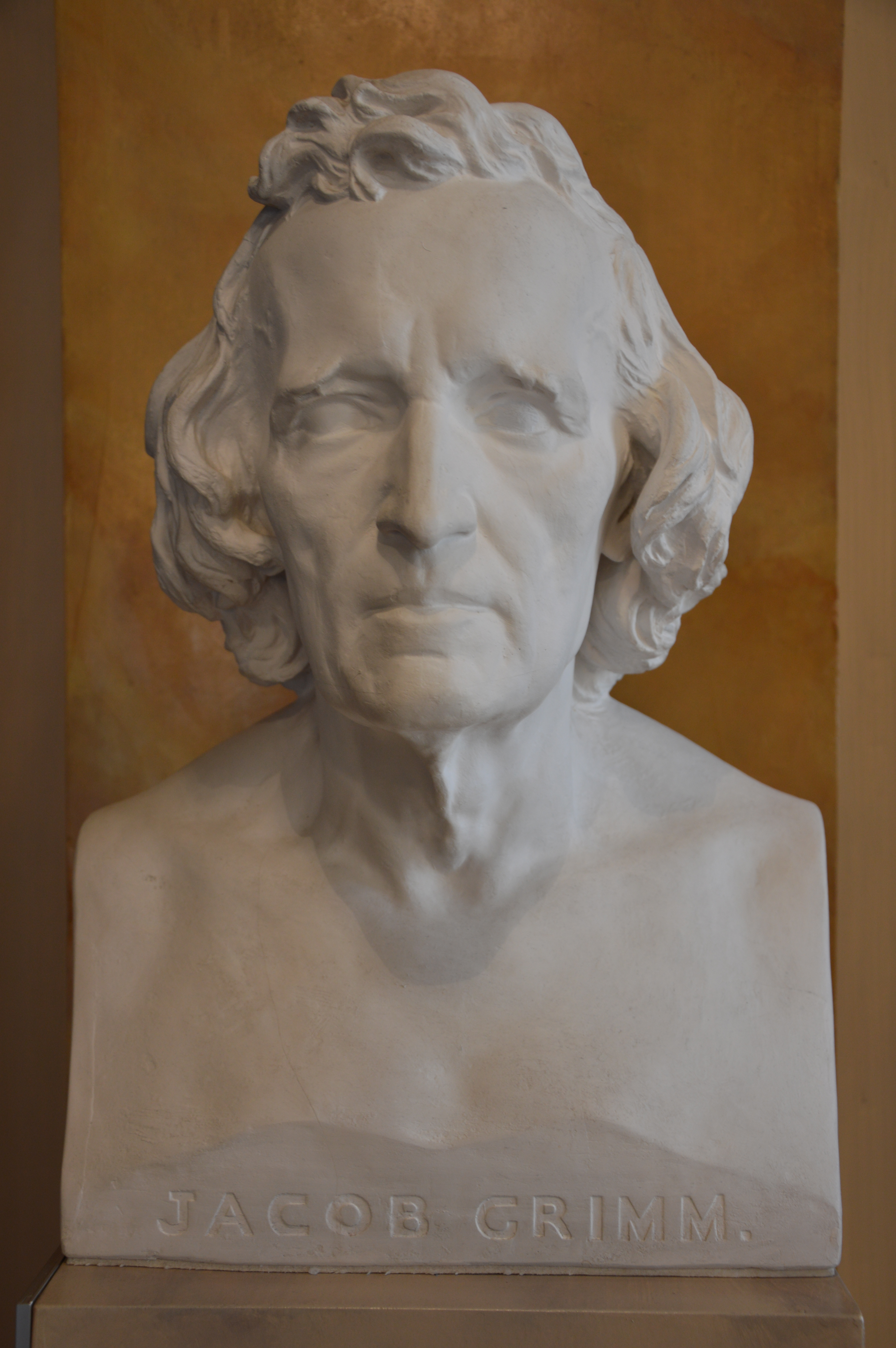
- Plaster copy of the bust at the University of Göttingen
- Artist: Elisabet Ney
- Year: 1858
- Medium: Marble sculpture
- Subject: Jacob Grimm
- Dimensions: 48 cm (19 in)
- Location: Elisabet Ney Museum, Austin, Texas, United States

Jacob Grimm is a sculpture of German philologist Jacob Grimm by sculptor Elisabet Ney. Completed in 1858, the piece is a portrait bust rendered in marble. The bust was modeled and carved in Berlin, but it is now held by the Elisabet Ney Museum in Austin, Texas.

== History ==
As a young artist in 1850s Berlin, Elisabet Ney studied under the prominent sculptor Christian Daniel Rauch. Rauch introduced Ney to various luminaries of the city, including philologist Jacob Grimm, the elder of the two famed Brothers Grimm. Grimm sat for Ney to compose his portrait in 1856, after which she developed the piece until its completion in marble in 1858. The piece is now owned by the Elisabet Ney Museum in Austin, Texas, where Ney moved later in life.

== Design ==
Grimm depicts its subject in his early seventies, unclothed, with bare shoulders and upper chest showing. The front of the base is inscribed with the words "JACOB GRIMM." The piece blends neoclassical elements (such as the neutral pose and unincised eyes) with realistic details, such as wrinkled, sagging skin and a receding hairline; this blending of classicism and realism is an approach to portraiture that reflects the stylistic influence of Ney's mentor, Christian Daniel Rauch. In this respect, Grimm is speculated to be representative of Ney's other works from the period, most of which are now lost (including a bust of Varnhagen von Ense and a medallion portrait of Alexander von Humboldt).
