= Bust of Eilhard Mitscherlich =

Sculpture of Mitscherlich by Elisabet Ney

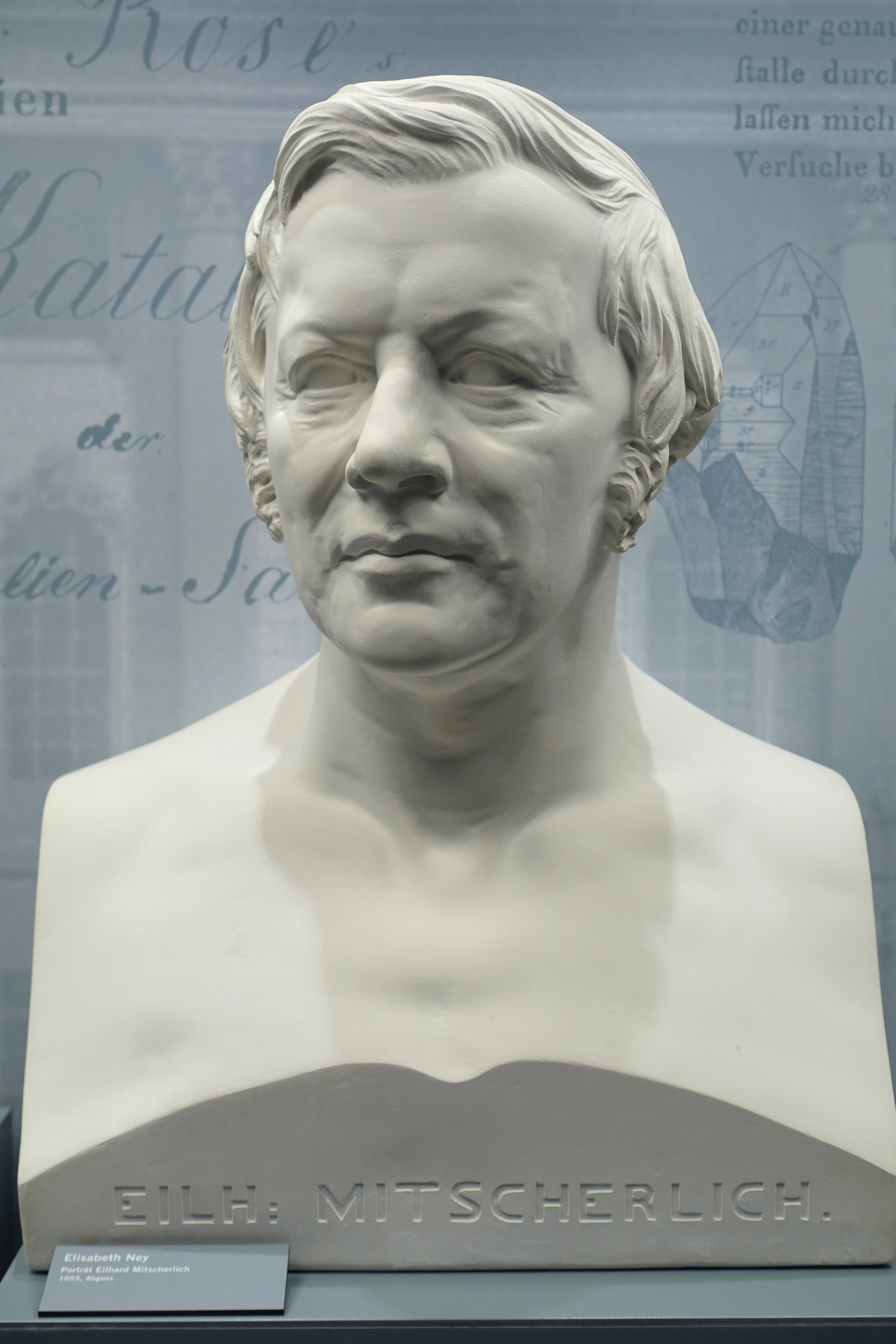
- Bust on display in the Natural History Museum, Berlin
- Artist: Elisabet Ney
- Year: 1863
- Medium: Marble sculpture
- Subject: Eilhard Mitscherlich
- Dimensions: 63 cm × 41 cm × 31 cm (25 in × 16 in × 12 in)
- Location: Natural History Museum, Berlin, Germany

Eilhard Mitscherlich is a sculpture of German chemist Eilhard Mitscherlich by sculptor Elisabet Ney. Completed in 1863, the piece is a portrait bust rendered in marble. The marble bust is now held by the Berlin's Natural History Museum, while the original plaster is displayed in Mitscherlich's mausoleum in Berlin's Alter St.-Matthäus-Kirchhof.

== History ==
In the early 1860s, sculptor Elisabet Ney kept her studio in Berlin, where she had trained under the recently deceased Christian Daniel Rauch. The critical success of her 1859 portrait bust of philosopher Arthur Schopenhauer had led to a commission for a portrait of King George V of Hanover; these two works won Ney a degree of celebrity in German artistic circles.

In 1861 she received a commission for a portrait of the chemist Eilhard Mitscherlich, a prominent and much-decorated researcher at the Frederick William University in Berlin. Ney showed the finished plaster version of the portrait at the Paris Salon of 1861, alongside her portrait of Schopenhauer. She subsequently cut a final version of the piece in marble in 1863. The marble is now held by the Natural History Museum in Berlin, while the plaster original was installed in Mitscherlich's mausoleum in the Alter St.-Matthäus-Kirchhof after his death.

== Design ==
Mitscherlich depicts its subject in his late sixties, unclothed, with bare shoulders and upper chest showing. The figure's head is turned to the right, with a slight smile dimpling the cheeks. The front of the base is inscribed with the words "EILH: MITSCHERLICH." The piece blends neoclassical elements (such as the absence of clothing and unincised eyes) with realistic details, such as wrinkled skin and a receding hairline; this blending of classicism and realism is an approach to portraiture that reflects the stylistic influence of Ney's mentor, Christian Daniel Rauch.
