= Elisabet Ney =

German–American sculptor

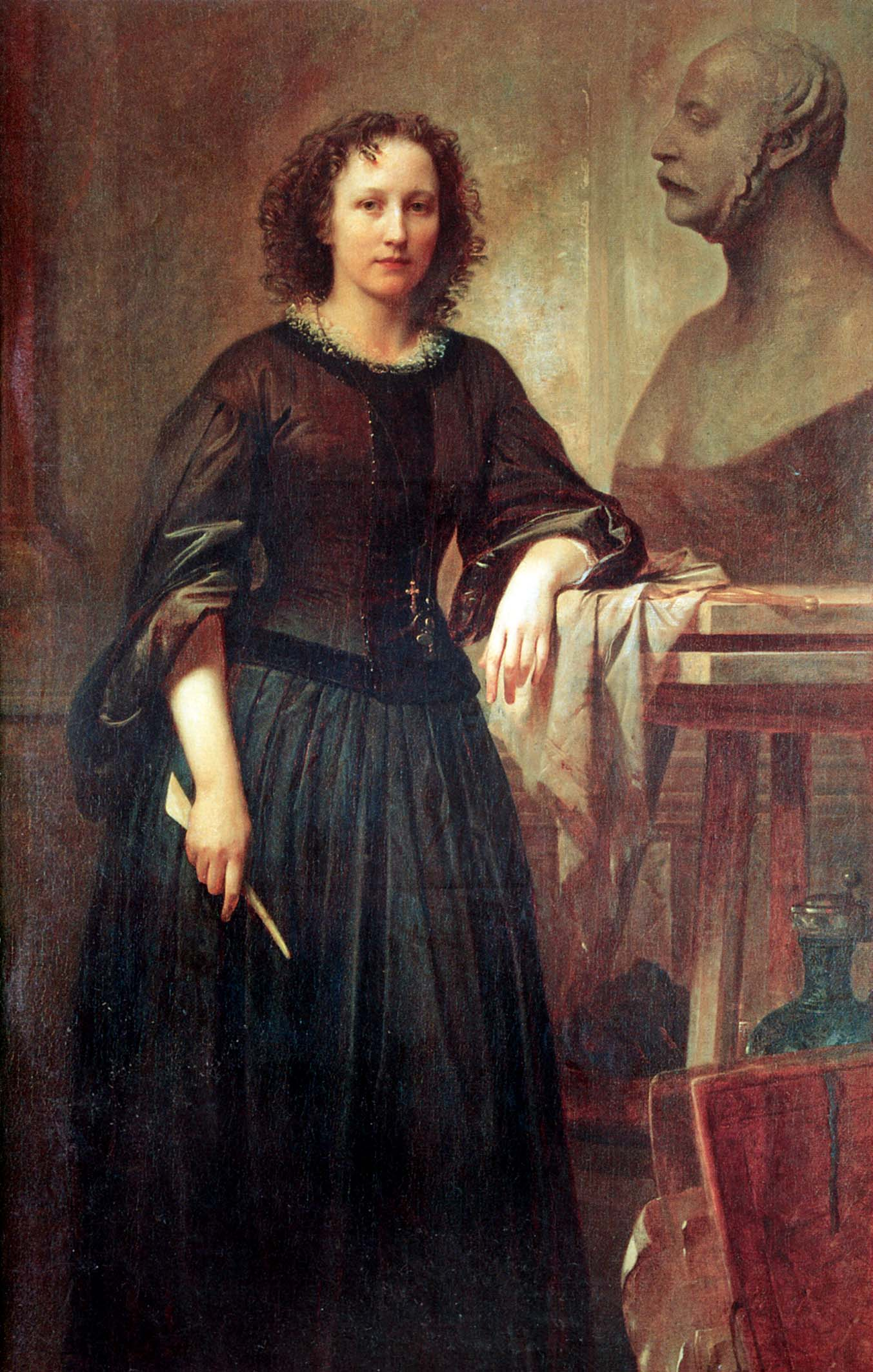
- Elisabet Ney by Friedrich Kaulbach, 1860; With a bust of King George V of Hanover
- Born: Franzisca Bernadina Wilhelmina Elisabeth Ney; January 26, 1833; Münster, Province of Westphalia, Prussia
- Died: June 29, 1907 (aged 74); Austin, Texas, U.S.
- Known for: Sculpture
- Spouse: Edmund Montgomery
- Children: Arthur Montgomery, Lorne Ney Montgomery
- Memorials: Elisabet Ney Museum

Bernadina Wilhelmina Elisabeth Ney (January 26, 1833 – June 29, 1907) was a German-American sculptor who spent the first half of her life and career in Europe, producing portraits of famous leaders such as Otto von Bismarck, Giuseppe Garibaldi and King George V of Hanover. At age 39, she immigrated to Texas with her husband, Edmund Montgomery, and became a pioneer in the development of art there. Among her most famous works during her Texas period were life-size marble figures of Sam Houston and Stephen F. Austin, commissions for the Texas State Capitol. A large group of her works are housed in the Elisabet Ney Museum, located in her home and studio in Austin. Other works can be found in the United States Capitol, the Smithsonian American Art Museum, and numerous collections in Germany.

== Early life ==
Ney was born in Münster, in the Province of Westphalia, to Johann Adam Ney, a stonecarver and alleged nephew of Field Marshal Michel Ney, and Anna Elizabeth (Wernze) Ney on January 26, 1833. The only other surviving child in the Ney family was her older brother, Fritz. Her parents were Catholics of Alsatian-Polish heritage. She was the great-niece of Michel Ney, Marshal of France. Early in life, she declared that her goal was "to know great persons."

== Career ==
=== Europe ===
Ney grew up assisting her father in his work. She went on a weeks-long hunger strike when her parents opposed her becoming a sculptor, prompting her parents to request the assistance of their local bishop. Her parents finally relented and in 1852, she became the first female sculpture student at the Munich Academy of Art under professor Max von Widnmann. She received her diploma on July 29, 1854. After graduating she moved to Berlin to study under Christian Daniel Rauch. Under Rauch she studied realism and the German artistic tradition, and began sculpting her first portraits of the German elite.

Ney opened a studio in Berlin in 1857. The German philosopher Arthur Schopenhauer agreed to sit for a sculpted portrait at the persuasion of Edmund Montgomery, whom she would marry in 1863. It was hailed as an artistic success and led to other commissions, most notably Jacob Grimm of the Brothers Grimm, the Italian military leader Giuseppe Garibaldi, the composer Richard Wagner, Cosima von Bülow (the daughter of Franz Liszt and Wagner's future wife), the Prussian-German political figure Otto von Bismarck, and King George V of Hanover. The latter also commissioned bust portraits of the composer Josef Joachim and his wife, the contralto Amalie Weiss Joachim. Shortly after completing the Bismarck bust, Ney was commissioned in 1868 by Prussian agents to sculpt a full-length portrait of Ludwig II of Bavaria in Munich.

=== United States ===
In the early 1880s, Ney, by then a Texas resident, was invited to Austin by Governor Oran M. Roberts, which resulted in the resumption of her artistic career. In 1892, she built a studio named Formosa in the Hyde Park neighborhood north of Austin and began to seek commissions.

In 1891, Ney was commissioned by the Board of Lady Managers of the Chicago World's Fair Association, and supplemented with US$32,000 by the Texas state legislature, to model figures of Sam Houston and Stephen F. Austin for the Woman's Building at the World's Columbian Exposition World's Fair in 1893. Ney missed the deadline and the sculptures were not shown at the Exhibition. The marble sculptures of Houston and Austin can now be seen in both the Texas State Capitol in Austin and in the National Statuary Hall Collection in the U.S. Capitol in Washington, D.C. She was commissioned to sculpt a memorial to the career military officer and war hero Albert Sidney Johnston for his grave in the Texas State Cemetery. One of her signature works was the figure of Lady Macbeth; the plaster model is in the Elisabet Ney Museum and the completed marble is in the Smithsonian American Art Museum collection. She succeeded in having the orator, three-time presidential candidate, and noted attorney William Jennings Bryan sit for a portrait; she hoped to sell replicas of this bust to debate clubs across the country.

Her 1903 life-size portrait bust of David Thomas Iglehart can be found at Symphony Square in Austin, where it is on permanent loan to the Austin Symphony Society. What is considered to be possible the last known work of Ney, a sculpture of a tousled haired cherub resting over a grave and known as the 1906 Schnerr Memorial, can be found at Der Stadt Friedhof in Fredericksburg, Texas.

In addition to her sculpting activities, Ney was also active in cultural affairs in Austin. Formosa become a center for cultural gatherings and curiosity seekers. The composer Paderewski and the Russian ballerina Anna Pavlova were among her visitors.

== Personal life ==
While visiting friends in Heidelberg in 1853, Ney met a young Scottish medical student, scientist, and philosopher named Edmund Montgomery. They kept in touch, and, although she viewed the institution of marriage as a state of bondage for women, after he established a medical practice in Madeira, they were married at the British consulate there on November 7, 1863.

Ney, however, remained outspoken about women's roles. She refused to use Montgomery's name, often denied she was even married, and once remarked:

Women are fools to be bothered with housework. Look at me; I sleep in a hammock which requires no making up. I break an egg and sip it raw. I make lemonade in a glass, and then rinse it, and my housework is done for the day.

She wore pants and rode her horses astride as men did. She liked to fashion her own clothes, which, in addition to the slacks, included boots and a black artist frock coat.

Montgomery was diagnosed with tuberculosis in 1863. By 1870, the Franco-Prussian War had begun. In autumn of that year, Ney became pregnant with their first child. Montgomery received a letter from his friend, Baron Carl Vicco Otto Friedrich Constantin von Stralendorff of Mecklenburg-Schwerin, who had moved to Thomasville, Georgia with his new wife, Margaret Elizabeth Russell of Boston, Massachusetts, declaring the location "Earth's paradise." On January 14, 1871, Ney and Montgomery, accompanied by their housekeeper, Cenci, immigrated to Georgia, to a colony promoted as a resort for consumptives. Their first son, Arthur, was born there in 1871, but died two years later (possibly of diphtheria, but the cause of death is disputed). Unfortunately, the Thomasville colony did not work out as they had hoped. Baron and Baroness von Stralendorff returned to Wismar, Germany where he died on July 1, 1872.

Ney and Montgomery looked elsewhere in the United States for a place to live, including Red Wing, Minnesota, where their second son, Lorne (1872–1913), was born. Later that year, Ney traveled alone to Texas. With the help of Julius Runge a businessman in Galveston, she was shown Liendo Plantation near Hempstead in Waller County. On March 4, 1873, Montgomery and the rest of the family arrived, and they purchased the plantation. While he tended to his research, she ran it for the next twenty years.

Ney participated in the woman's suffrage movement in Texas, when speaking on behalf of a bill to give women the vote in Texas in 1907. Though Texas had no official suffrage organization at the time, herself and several other women attended the committee hearing at the state capitol and spoke. The resolution failed.

== Death and legacy ==
Ney died in her studio on June 29, 1907, and is buried next to Montgomery, who died four years later, at Liendo Plantation.

Upon her death, Montgomery sold the Formosa studio to Ella Dancy Dibrell. As per her wishes, its contents were bequeathed to the University of Texas at Austin, but were to remain in the building. On April 6, 1911, Dibrell and other friends established the Texas Fine Arts Association (after more than a century in existence, the organization is now known as the Contemporary Austin) in her honor. It is the oldest Texas-wide organization existing for support of the visual arts. Formosa is now the home of the Elisabet Ney Museum. In 1941, the City of Austin took over the ownership and operation.

In 1961, Lake Jackson Primary School in Lake Jackson, Texas was renamed Elisabet Ney Elementary School in her honor.

== Gallery ==
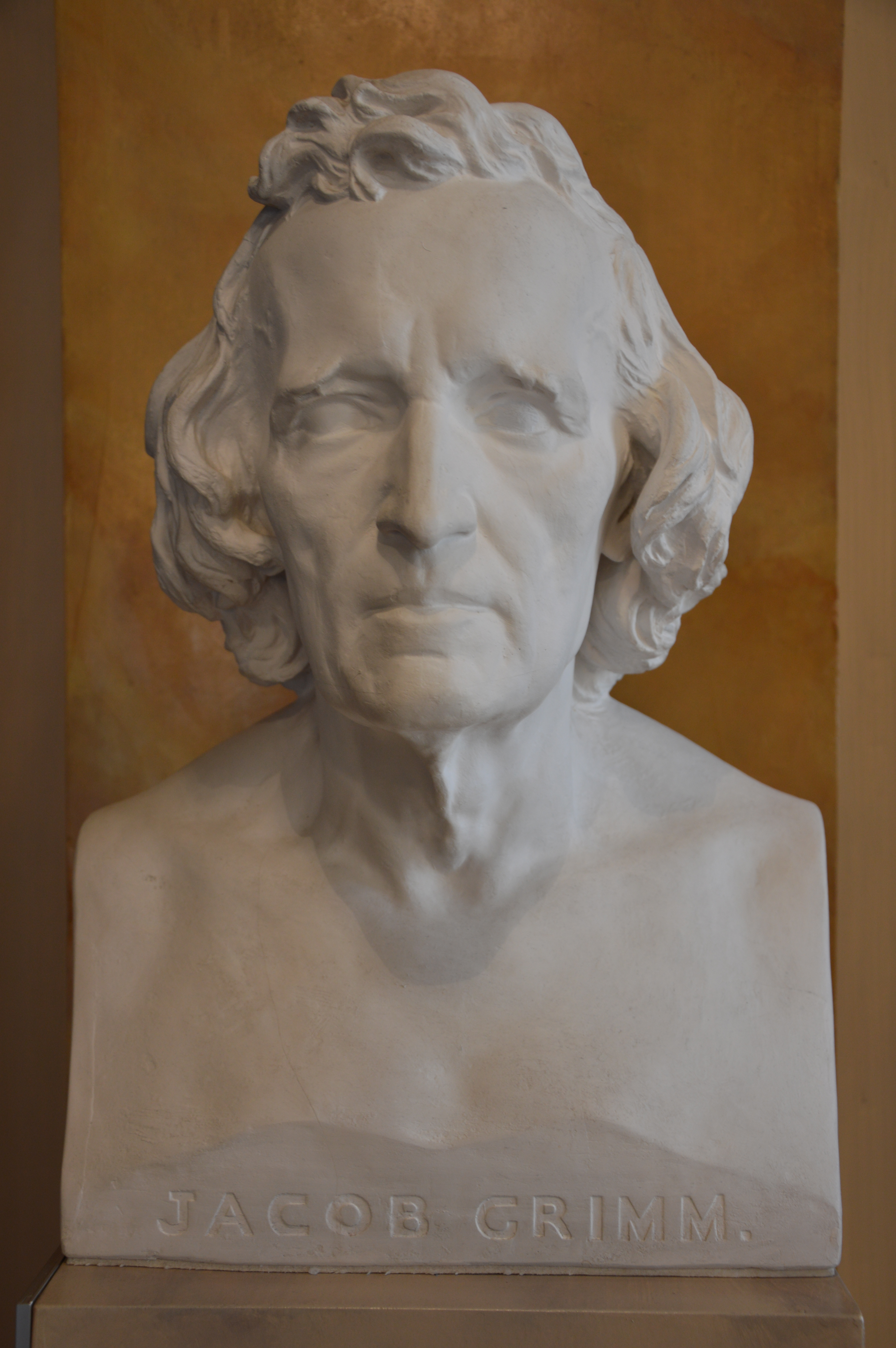
Portrait bust of Jacob Grimm

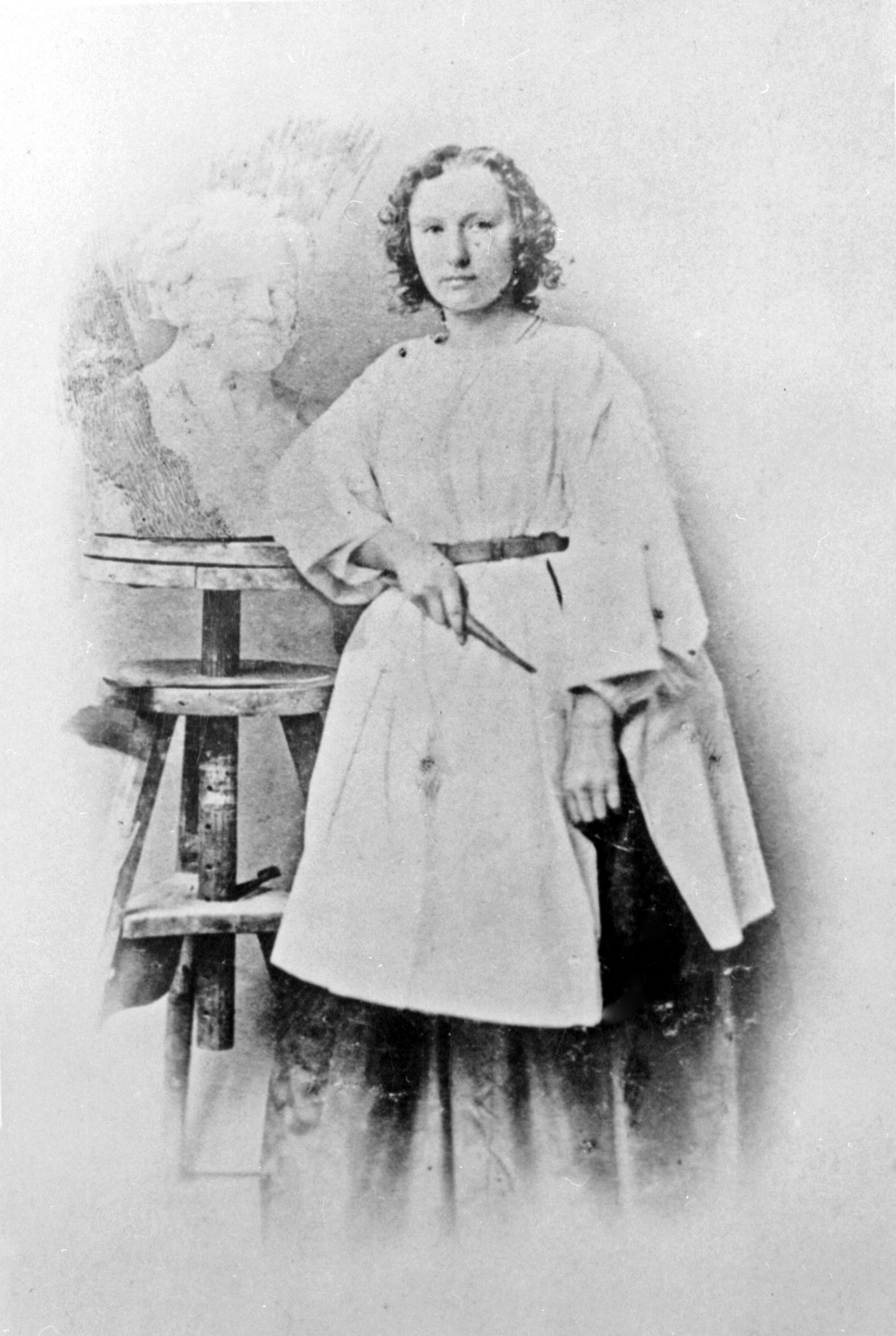
Elisabeth Ney c. 1859 with a bust of Arthur Schopenhauer

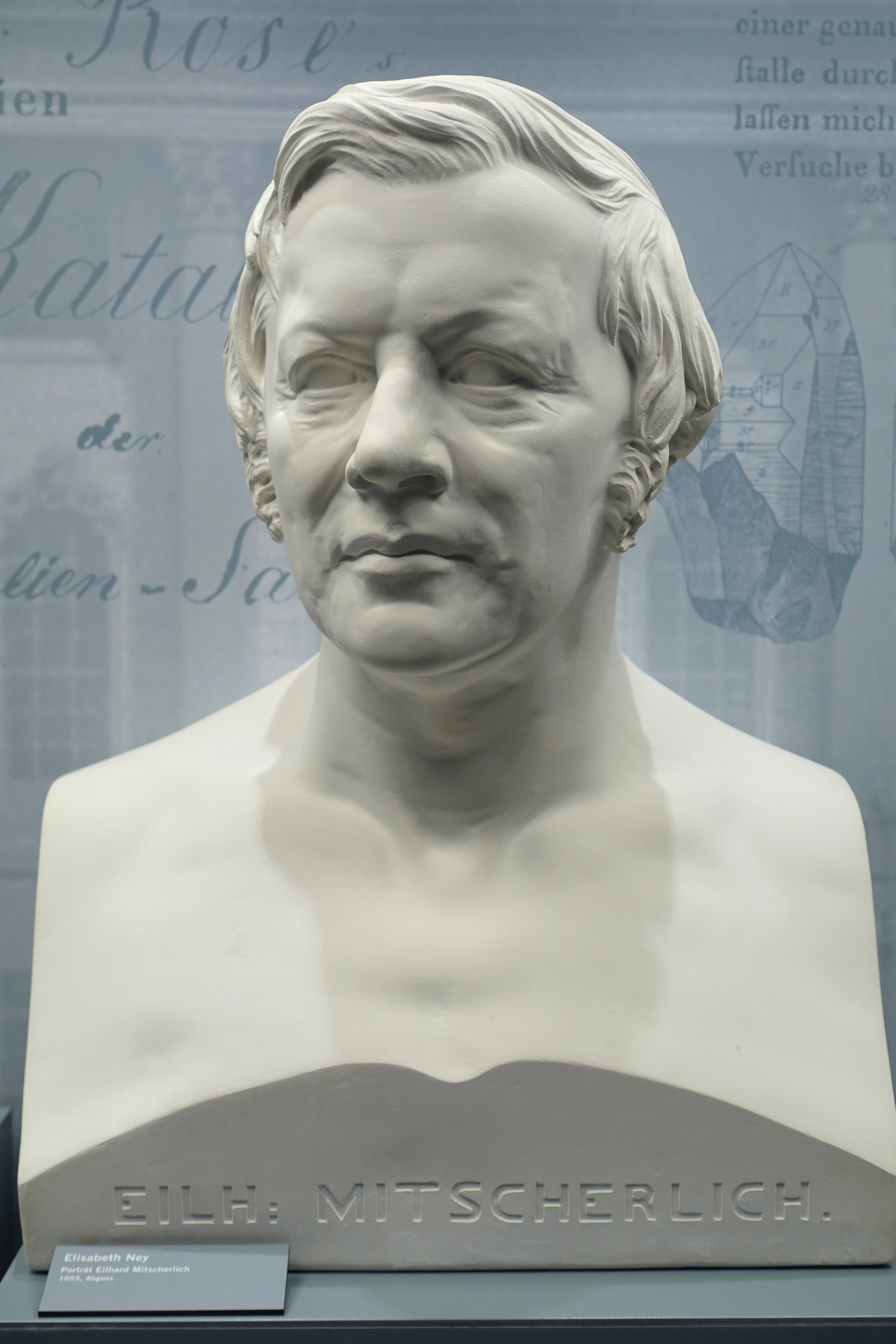
Portrait bust of Eilhard Mitscherlich

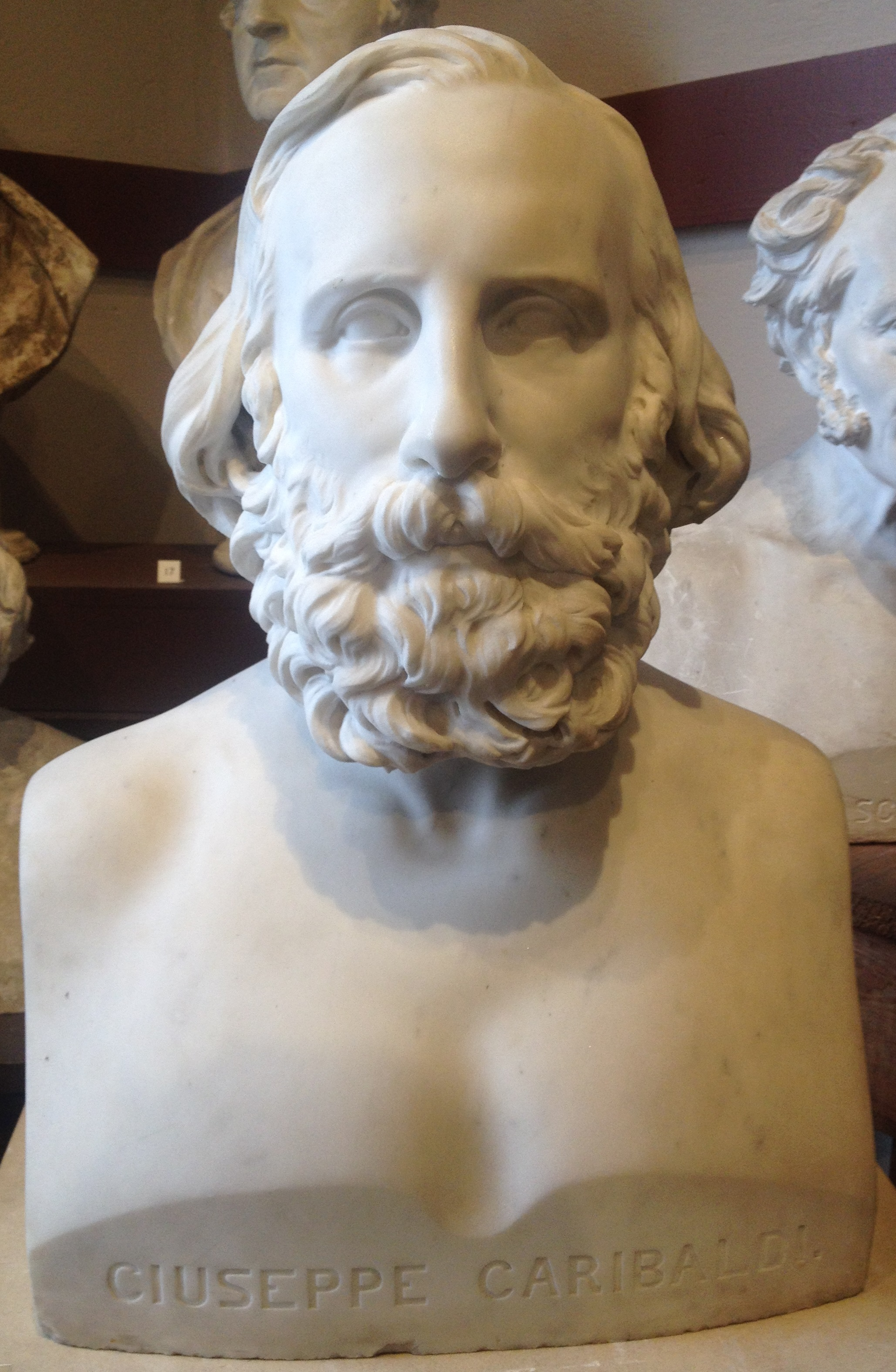
Portrait bust of Giuseppe Garibaldi

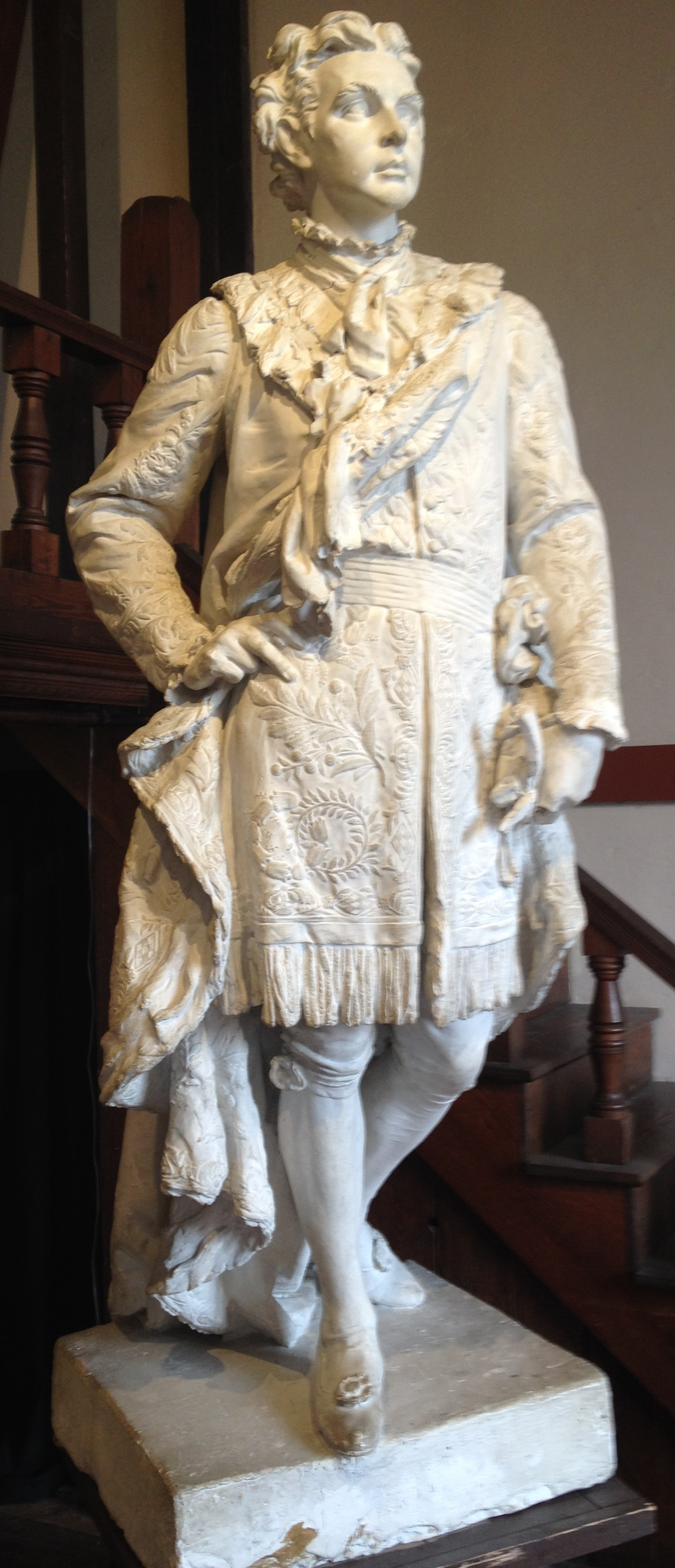
Portrait statue of Ludwig II of Bavaria

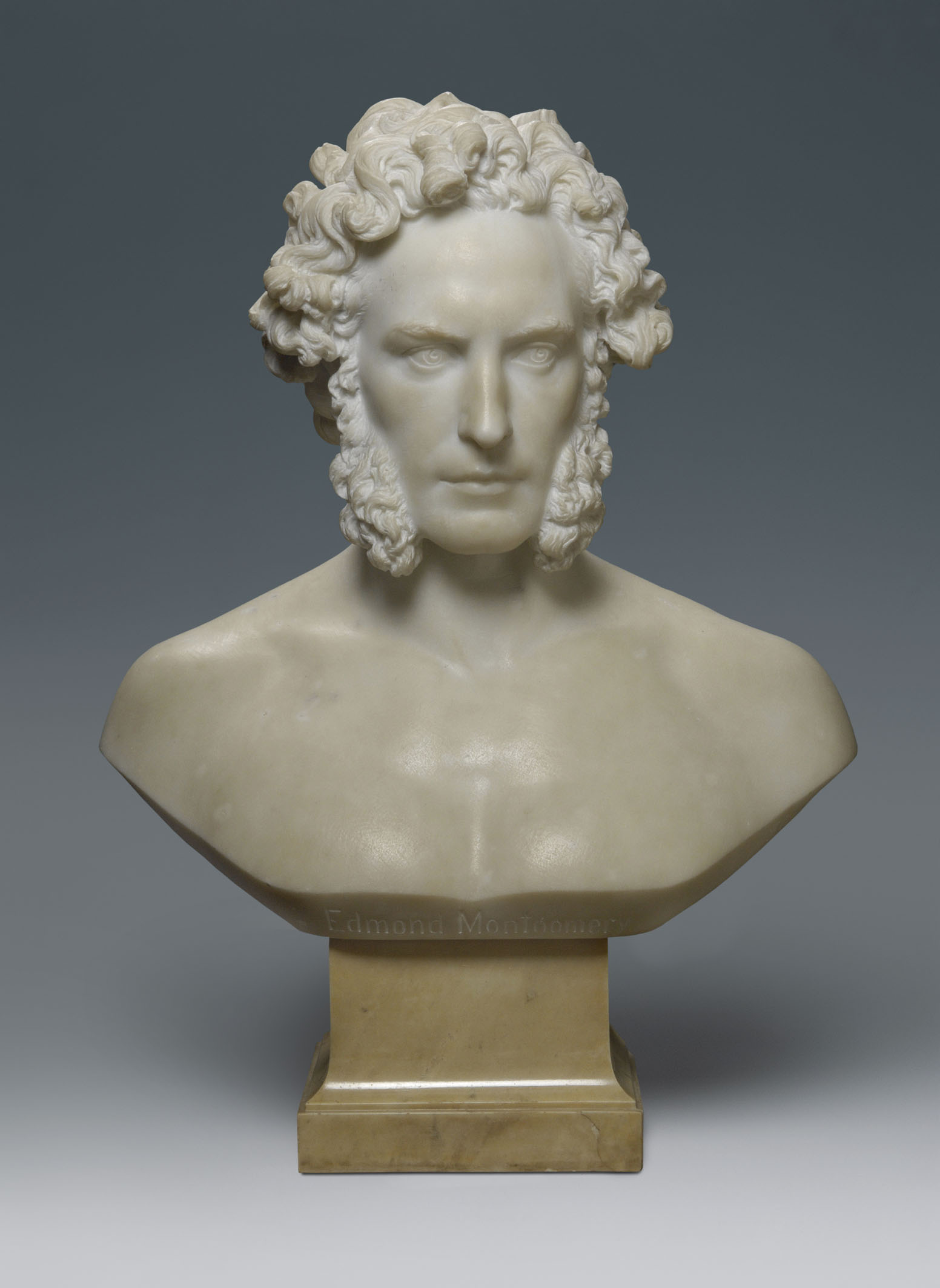
Edmund Montgomery

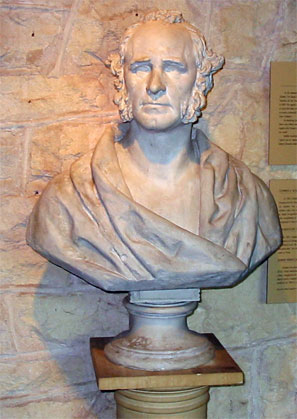
Sam Houston

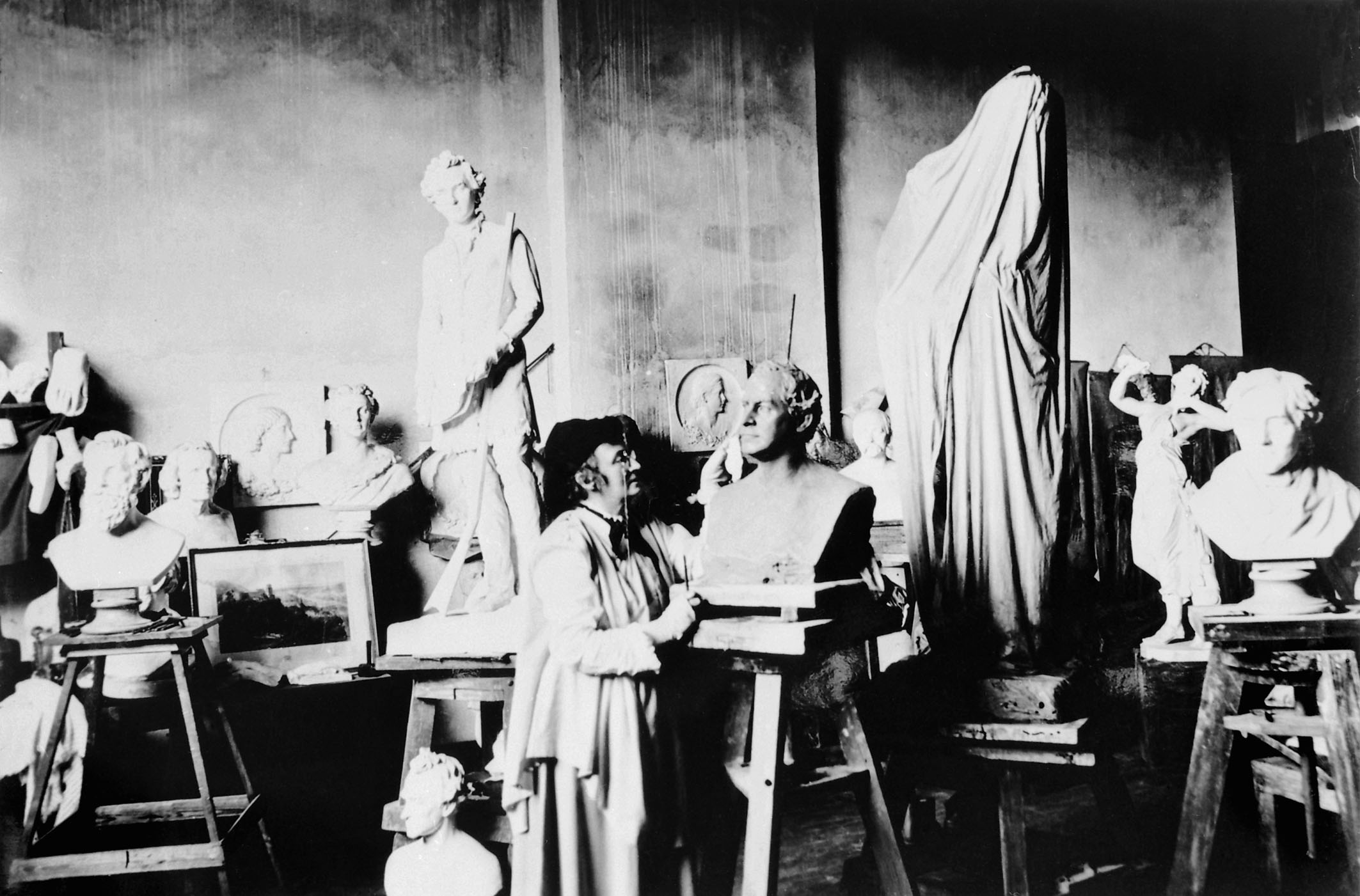
Elisabet Ney in her studio in Texas circa 1900

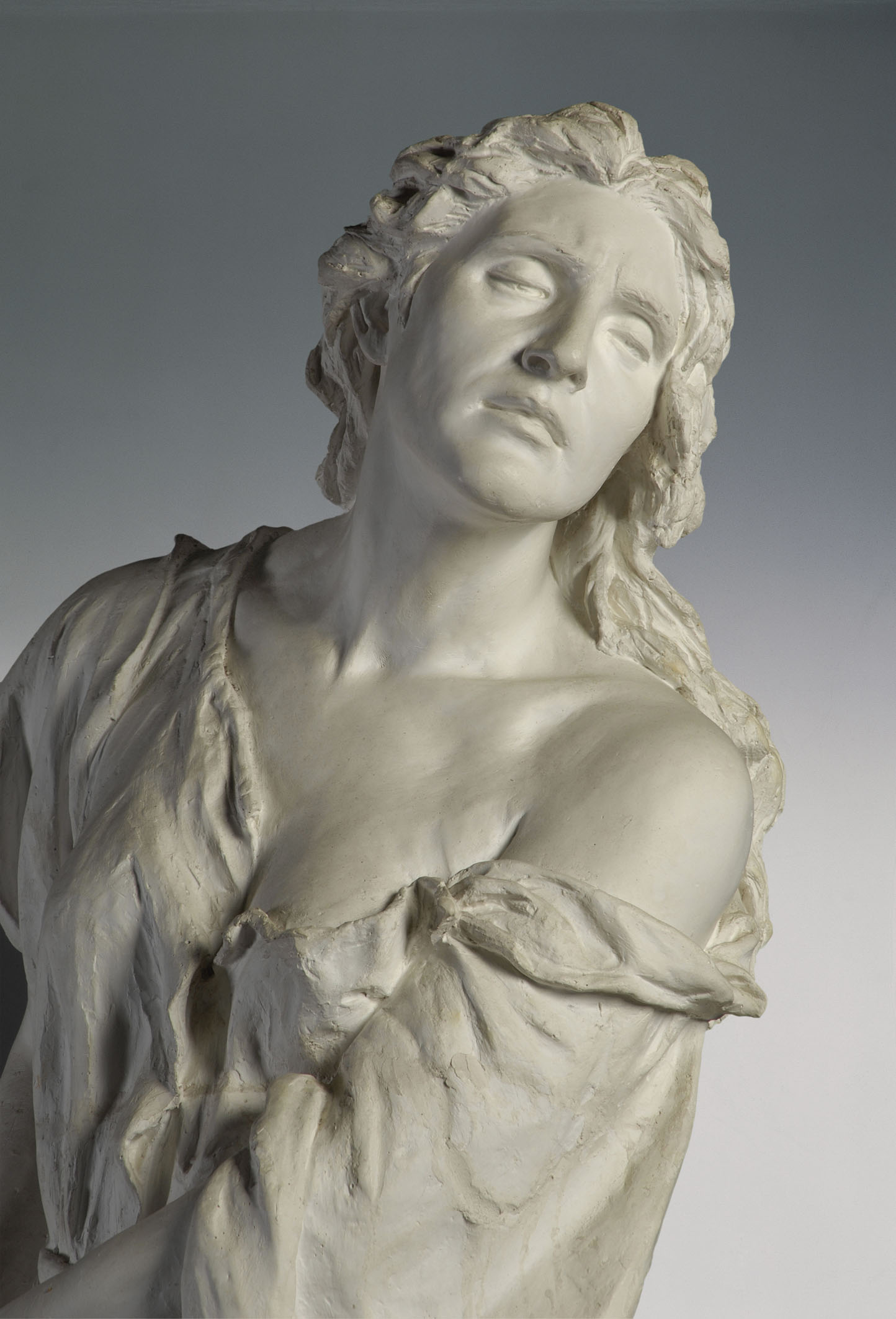
Lady Macbeth

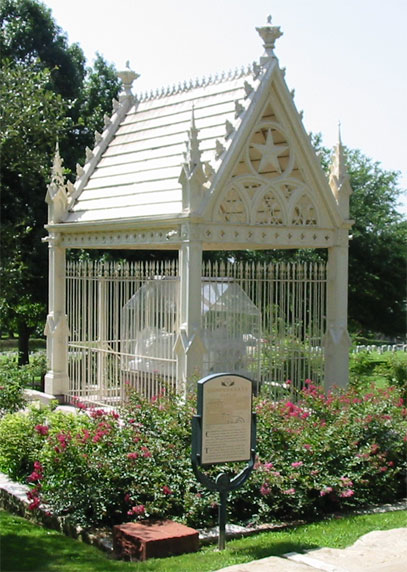
Tomb of Albert Sidney Johnston in the Texas State Cemetery

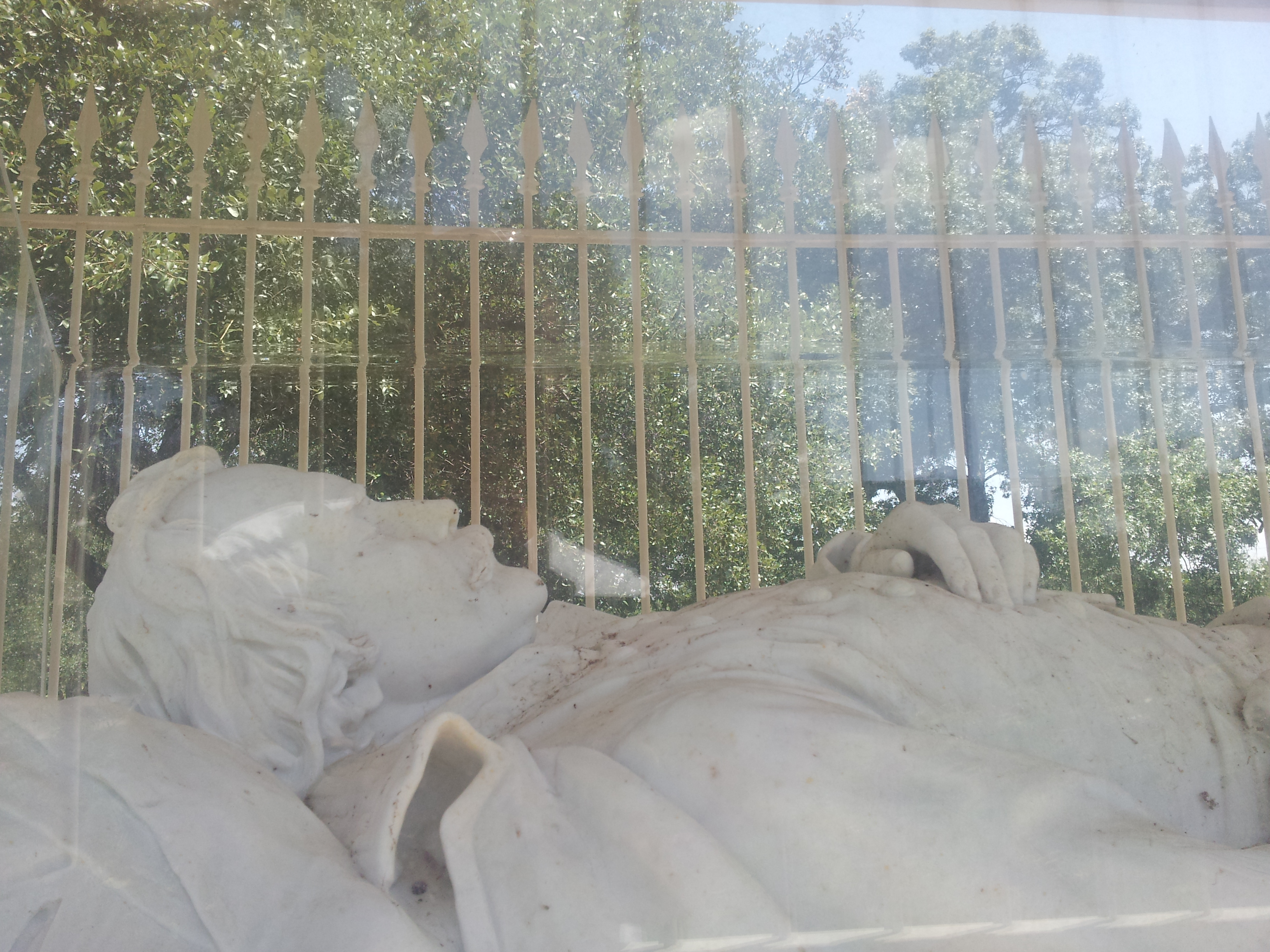
Statue of Albert Sidney Johnston

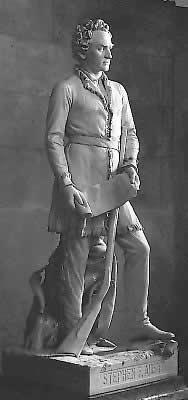
Statue of Stephen F. Austin
Given by Texas to the National Statuary Hall Collection

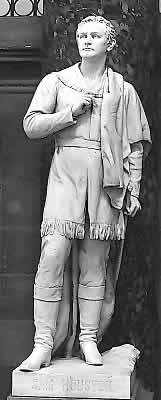
Statue of Sam Houston
Given by Texas to the National Statuary Hall Collection

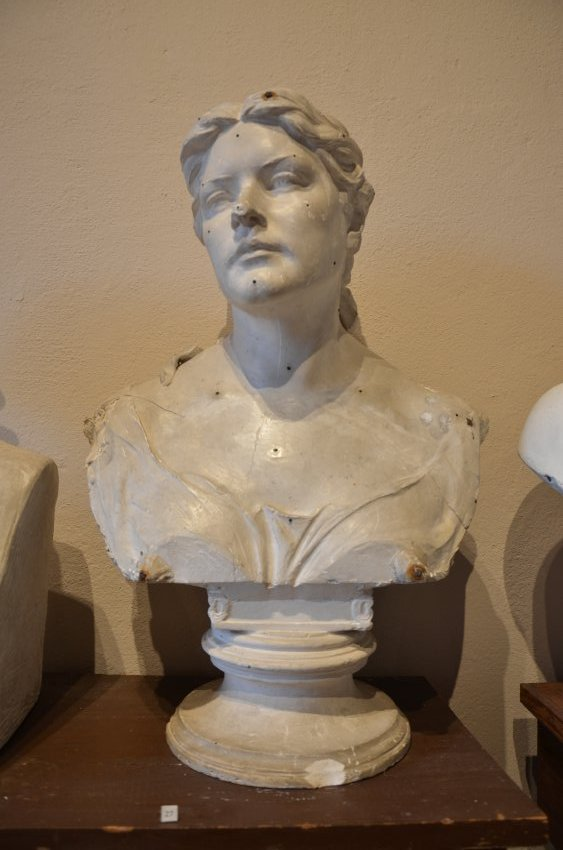
Point plaster bust of Amalie Joachim

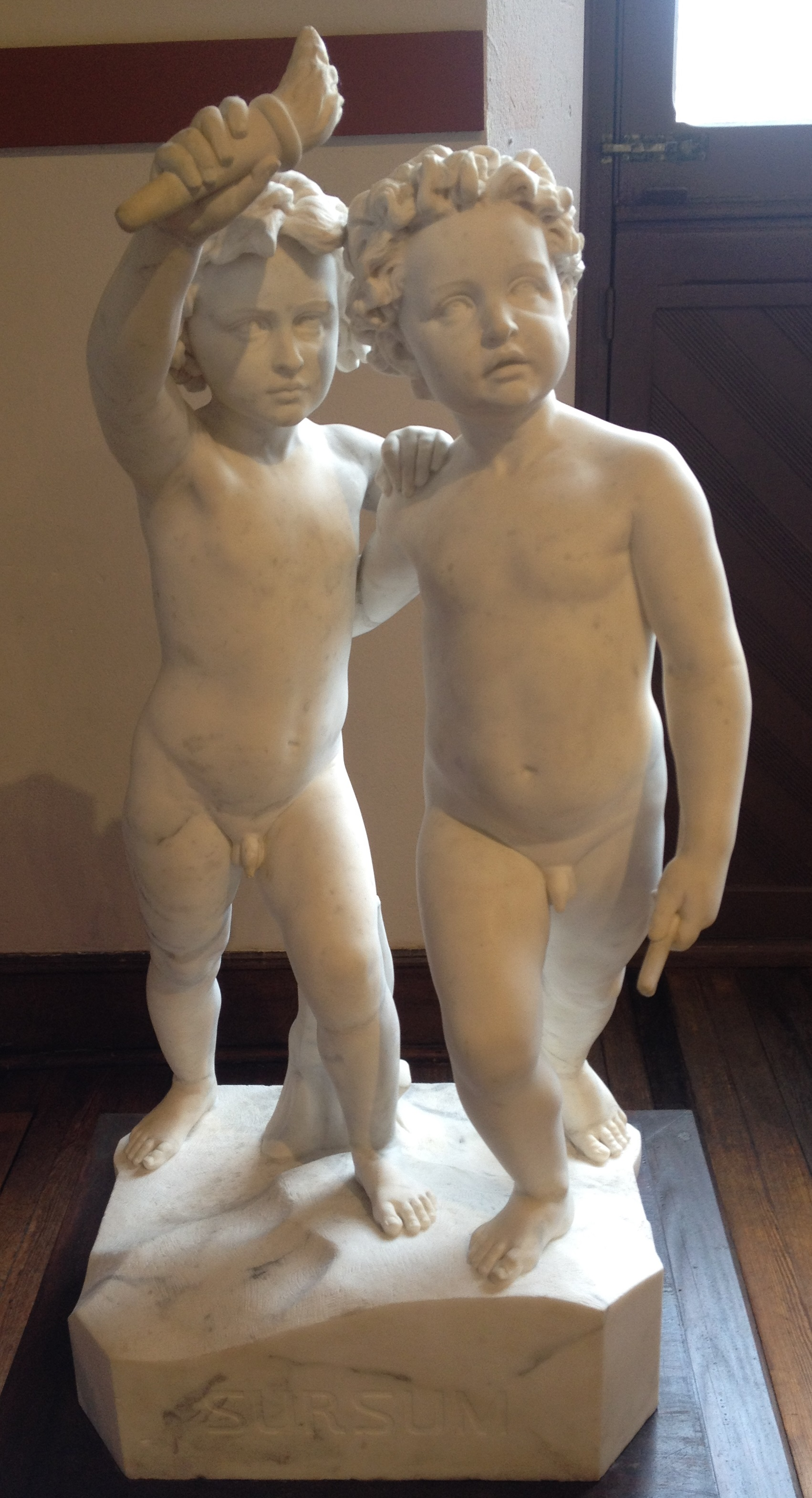
Sursum marble sculpture 1866

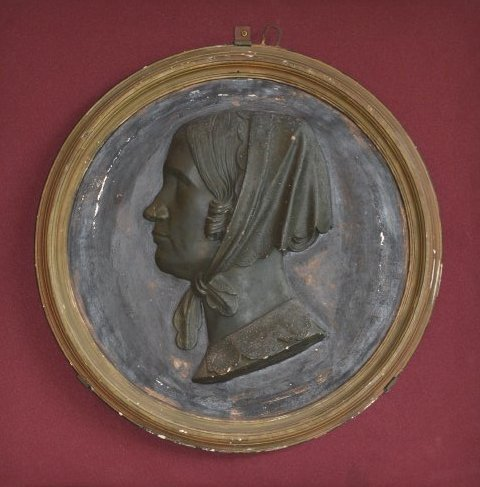
Anna Elizabeth Wernze Ney, plaster medallion 1855

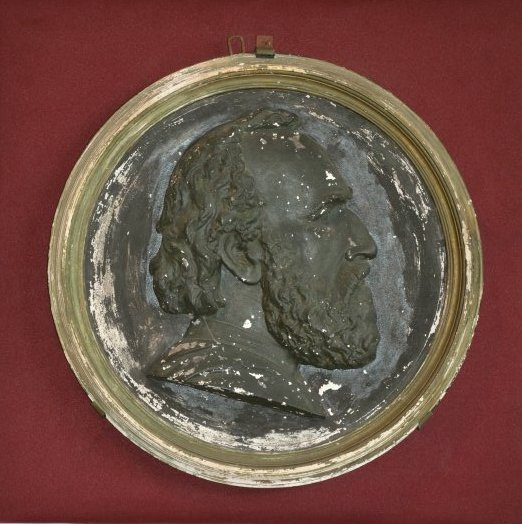
Johann Adam Ney, plaster medallion 1855

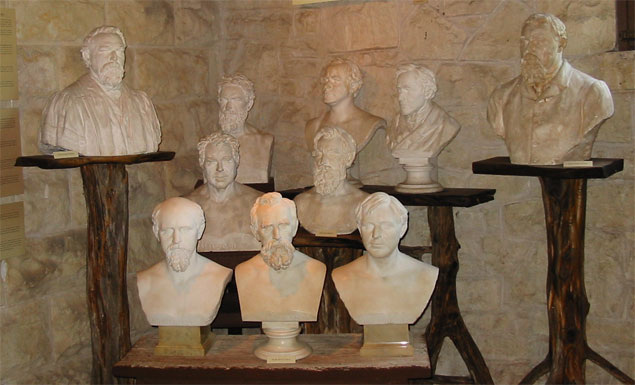
Elisabet Ney Museum

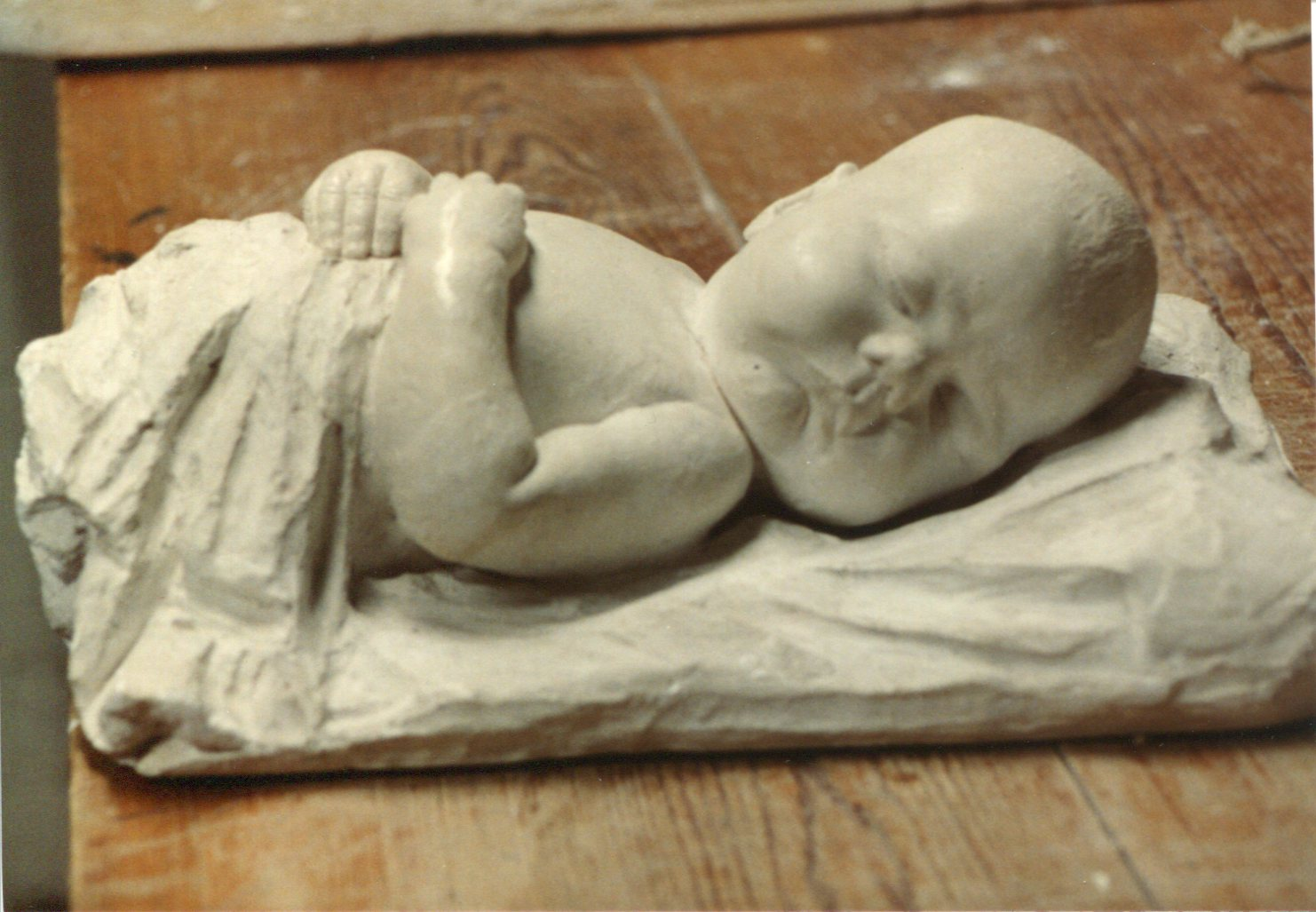
Miller Baby Death Cast by Elisabet Ney 1899

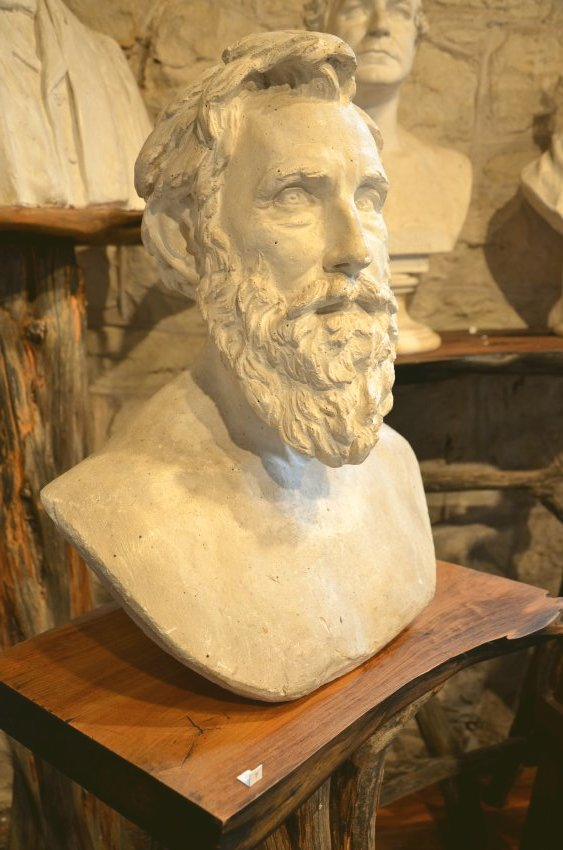
Oran Roberts plaster bust by Elisabet Ney

== Works ==
Below is a partial listing of her works.

Year	Work	Location
1855	Johann Adam Ney - medallion	Munster
1855	Anna Elisabeth Wernze Ney - medallion	Munster
1855	Tyras – Adam Ney's Dog	Munster
1856	Grave Stele Relief	Berlin
1856	Herman Weiss	Berlin
1857	St. Sebastian Martyr – plaster	Munster
1857	St. Sebastian Martyr – marble	Munster
1857	St. Sebastian Resurrected	Munster
1857	Christ Resurrected	Munster
1858	Jacob Grimm – marble	Berlin
1858	Alexander von Humboldt - medallion	Berlin
1858	Cosima von Bülow - medallion	Berlin
1859	Arthur Schopenhauer – plaster	Frankfurt
1859	Arthur Schopenhauer – marble	Frankfurt
1859	King George V of Hanover – medallion	Hannover
1859	King George V of Hanover – bust	Hannover
1859	King George V of Hanover – colossal bust	Hannover
1861	Joseph Joachim	Hannover
1861	Eilhard Mitscherlich - plaster	Hannover
1861	Ernst Herzog von Bayern	Munster
1861	Franz Friedrich von Furstenberg – figure	Munster
1862	Walter von Platenberg – study	Munster
1862	Walter von Platenberg – figure	Munster
1862	Count Englebert Vandermark – study	Munster
1861	Count Englebert Vandermark – figure	Munster
1862	Justus Möser – figure	Munster
1862	Clemens August Graf von Westphalen - bust	Munster
1862	Clemens August von Westphalen - bronze statuette	Private collection
1863	Ricci	England
1863	Elisabet Ney self-portrait	Madeira
1863	Thomas Taylor	England
1863	Genii of Mankind – plaster	England
1863	Self-Portrait – plaster	England
1863	Self-Portrait – marble	Madeira
1863	Eilhard Mitscherlich - marble	Hannover
1864	Edmund Montgomery – plaster	Madeira
1864	Edmund Montgomery – marble	Madeira
1864	Lady Marian Alford	Madeira
1864	Lord Brownlow	Madeira
1864	John William Spencer Egerton-Cust, 2nd Earl Brownlow	England
1864	Genii of Mankind – marble	Italy
1864	Minerva bringing Peace to Cupid and Psyche	England
1865	Giuseppe Garibaldi – statuette	Italy
1865	Giuseppe Garibaldi – plaster	Italy
1865	Giuseppe Garibaldi – marble	Italy
1865	Prometheus Bound	Austria
1867	Otto von Bismarck – plaster	Berlin
1867	Otto von Bismarck – marble	Berlin
1867	Amalie Weiss Joachim	Hannover
1868	Friedrich Woehler – bust	Munich
1868	Friedrich Woehler – colossal bust	Munich
1868	Baron Justus von Liebig – bust	Munich
1868	Baron Justus von Liebig – colossal bust	Munich
1868	Mercury – study	Munich
1868	Mercury – colossal figure	Munich
1868	Iris – study	Munich
1868	Iris – full figure	Munich
1868	Draped Figure – study	Munich
1868	Male Figure – study	Munich
1868	Frieze – study	Munich
1868	Fountain – study	Munich
1868	Count Georg von Werthern	Munich
1868	King Ludwig II – plaster	Munich
1868	King Ludwig II – marble	Munich
1868	King Ludwig II – life-size plaster	Munich
1874	Lorne Ney Montgomery – castings	Texas
1885	Oran M. Roberts – plaster	Texas
1885	Oran M. Roberts – marble	Texas
1886	Lorne Ney Montgomery	Texas
1887	Johanna Runge	Texas
1887	Julius Runge	Texas
1892	Benedette Tobin	Texas
1892	Sam Houston as Young Man – plaster bust	Texas
1892	Sam Houston as Older Man – bronze bust	Texas
1892	Sam Houston – life-size plaster	Texas
1892	Sam Houston – life-size marble	Texas
1892	Stephen F. Austin – study	Texas
1892	Stephen F. Austin – plaster bust	Texas
1893	Stephen F. Austin – life-size plaster	Texas
1893	Stephen F. Austin – life-size marble	Texas
1893	Governor W.P. Hardeman – plaster	Texas
1893	Governor W.P. Hardeman – marble	Texas
1895	Carrie Pease Graham – plaster	Texas
1895	Carrie Pease Graham – marble	Texas
1895	Senator John H. Reagan – plaster	Texas
1895	Senator John H. Reagan – marble	Texas
1895	Governor Francis R. Lubbock – plaster	Texas
1895	Governor Francis R. Lubbock – marble	Texas
1896	Paula Ebers – plaster	Berlin
1896	Paula Ebers – marble	Berlin
1896	Unknown Female Philanthropist	Berlin
1896	Unknown girl	Berlin
1896	Unknown woman	Berlin
1896	Dancing Maenad	Berlin
1897	Bride Neill Taylor – medallion	Texas
1897	Margaret Runge Rose – plaster	Texas
1897	Margaret Runge Rose – plaster	Texas
1897	Margaret Runge Rose – bronze	Texas
1899	Sir Swante Palm – plaster	Texas
1899	Sir Swante Palm – marble	Texas
1899	Lilly Haynie	Texas
1899	Steiner Burleson – plaster	Texas
1899	Steiner Burleson – marble	Texas
1899	William Jennings Bryan – plaster	Texas
1899	William Jennings Bryan – marble	Texas
1900	Guy M. Bryan – medallion	Texas
1901	Senator Joseph Dibrell – plaster	Texas
1901	Senator Joseph Dibrell – marble	Texas
1901	Ella Dancy Dibrell – medallion	Texas
1901	Governor Joseph Sayers – plaster	Texas
1902	Governor Joseph Sayers – marble	Texas
1902	Governor Sul Ross – plaster	Texas
1902	Governor Sul Ross – marble	Texas
1902	Bust of Christ	Texas
1902	Albert Sidney Johnston – bust	Texas
1902	Albert Sidney Johnston – life-size plaster	Texas
1902	Albert Sidney Johnston – life-size marble	Texas
1902	Jacob Bickler – medallion	Texas
1902	Lady Macbeth – study	Texas
1902	Lady Macbeth – life-size plaster	Texas
1902	Lady Macbeth - life-size plaster	Texas
1903	Dr. David Thomas Iglehart – plaster	Texas
1902	Dr. David Thomas Iglehart – bronze	Texas
1903	Miller Baby cast	Texas
1904	Helen Marr Kirby - medallion	Texas
1905	Lady Macbeth – life-size marble	Texas
1905	Dr. William Lambdin Prather	Texas
1906	Schnerr Memorial – wax	Texas
1906	Schnerr Memorial – plaster	Texas
1906	Schnerr Memorial – marble	Texas

== Additional sources ==
- Selected Bibliography, Elisabet Ney Museum
- Cutrer, Emily Fourmy, The Art of the Woman: The Life and Work of Elisabet Ney, University of Nebraska Press, Lincoln, Nebraska, 1988 (ISBN 0-8032-1438-3)
- Fortune, Jan and Jean Barton, Elisabet Ney, Alfred A. Knopf, New York, 1943
- Hendricks, Patricia D. and Becky Duval Reese, A Century of Sculpture in Texas: 1889–1989 (exhibition catalog), Archer M. Huntington Art Gallery, University of Texas Press, Austin, Texas, 1989
- Little, Carol Morris, A Comprehensive Guide to Outdoor Sculpture in Texas, University of Texas Press, Austin, Texas, 1996 (ISBN 0-292-76034-5)
