= Bride Neill Taylor =

American journalist (1858–1937)

- Born: January 12, 1858; Peoria, Illinois, U.S.
- Died: May 29, 1937 (aged 79); Austin, Texas, U.S.
- Resting place: Mount Calvary Cemetery
- Occupations: American writer; educator; civic leader
- Spouse: Thomas Frederick Taylor (m. 1880)

Bride Neill Taylor (January 12, 1858 – May 29, 1937) was an American writer, educator and civic leader. She was known for her short stories written in the tradition of realism. Taylor was also known for her non-fiction writing, which included writing about women's issues. She worked to preserve the studio of Elisabet Ney as a museum, and later wrote a biography of Ney. She was also an early member of the Texas State Historical Association.

== Biography ==
Taylor was born in Peoria, Illinois in 1858 and she and her family moved to Austin in 1871. Taylor's family were immigrants from Ireland, and Taylor was "an articulate Catholic." Her education took place in private schools in Austin, "including several convent schools." She also attended the Nazareth Academy in Kentucky where she graduated in 1876. She married Thomas Frederick Taylor, a civil servant, in April 1880. Taylor's brother, Charles P. Neill, was also a civil servant in Austin. Her husband's work took them to Washington, D.C. shortly after they were married.

Taylor began working as a journalist by starting as a "society editor" and drama critic for a Washington Paper, the Sun Capitol. Later, she became the Washington correspondent for an Austin paper, the Statesman. Taylor and her husband moved back to Austin when her mother became sick in 1883.

In 1883, she went to the University of Texas so that she could teach, and then taught in the public schools in Austin for four years. On December 1, 1893, Taylor and eight other women formed the American History Club. She also had one of her short stories, "When Hester Came," published in Lippincott's Notable Stories in 1893. Taylor was one of three women who took part in the initial gathering for the Texas State Historical Association in 1897. She became a charter member, and stood up for women's involvement in the group. She was involved with the Texas Woman's Press Association, where she was a charter member.

In 1907, Taylor requested that Paulists come to Austin to work with the University of Texas. She championed other Catholic causes in the city as well. Taylor helped found the Seton Infirmary, the St. Vincent's Aid Society, St. Austin's Chapel another mission churches. Taylor also "made many trips to Galveston" in order to alert the bishop, N.A. Gallagher, the head of the diocese, that there was a need for more access to Catholic worship, especially for students.

Taylor worked as a journalist up until her death in Austin on May 29, 1937. She was buried in Mount Calvary Cemetery in Austin.

== Selected works ==
- A Great Texas Artist. Austin, Texas: R.E. McCleary. 1897. OCLC 260095700.
- Neill, Taylor (1916). Elisabet Ney, Sculptor. New York: Devin-Adair. OCLC 39694888.
- Taylor, Bride Neill (July 1929). "The Beginnings of the State Historical Association". The Southwestern Historical Quarterly. 33 (1): 1–17. JSTOR 30237205.
