= Giuseppe Garibaldi (Ney) =

Sculpture of Garibaldi by Elisabet Ney

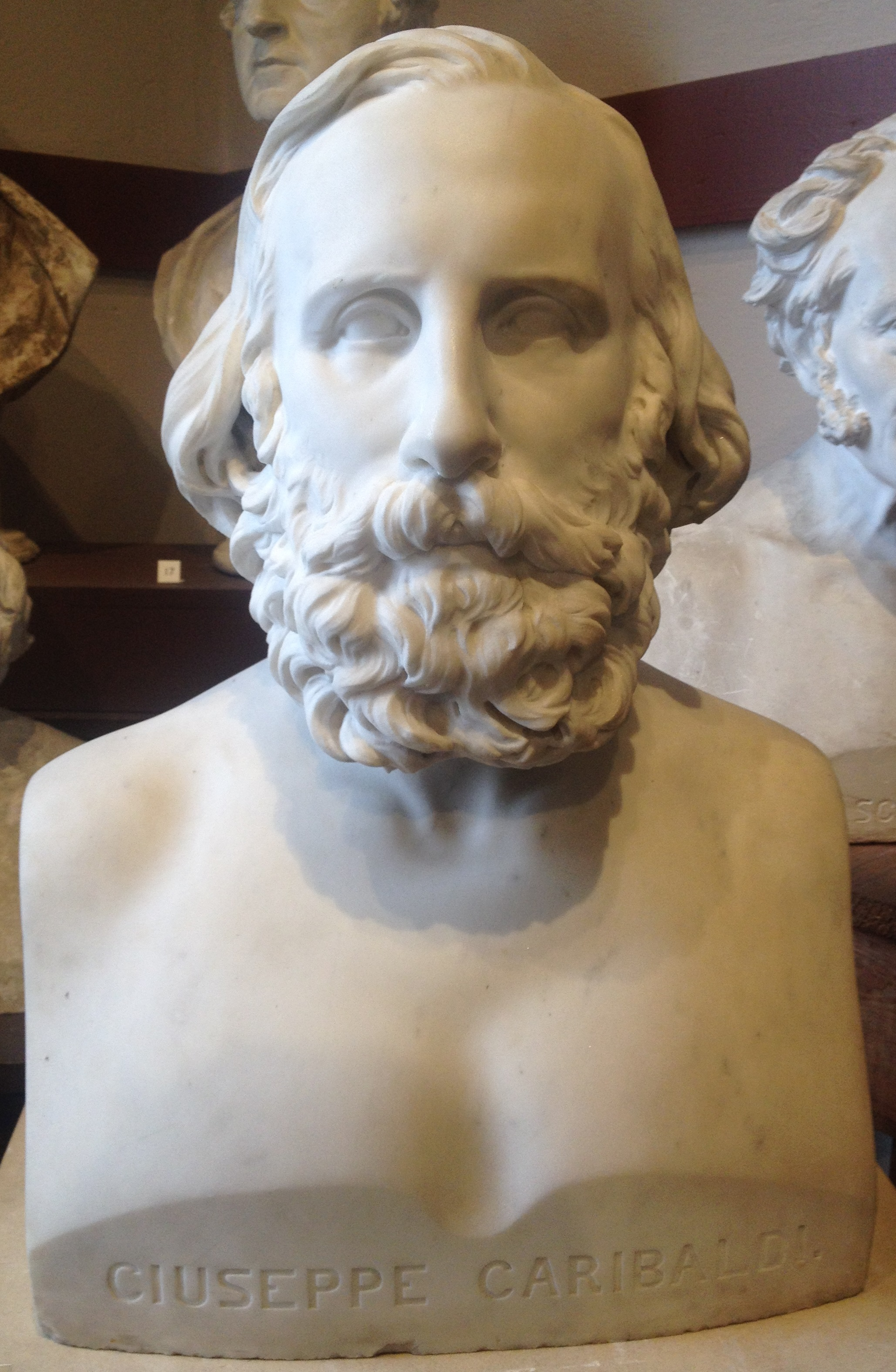
- Bust on display in the Elisabet Ney Museum in Austin, Texas
- Artist: Elisabet Ney
- Year: 1866
- Medium: Plaster
- Subject: Giuseppe Garibaldi
- Dimensions: 52.7 cm (20.75 in)
- Location: Elisabet Ney Museum, Austin, Texas

Giuseppe Garibaldi is a sculpture of Italian revolutionary Giuseppe Garibaldi by German sculptor Elisabet Ney. Completed in 1866, the piece is a portrait bust rendered in marble. The portrait was modeled and carved in Italy. It is on display at the Elisabet Ney Museum in Austin, Texas.

== History ==
In May 1865, German sculptor Elisabet Ney traveled to the small Sardinian island of Caprera to seek out the prominent Italian revolutionary Giuseppe Garibaldi, whose portrait she had decided to sculpt. Garibaldi initially refused to sit for her, but she insisted and finally persuaded him to cooperate. She composed the bust with Garibaldi for at least two weeks, during which time they frequently walked the island together and talked of his political aims and his frustration with the state of Italian politics. Ney remained on Caprera long enough to complete the bust, along with a miniature statuette of the general.

Ney cut the final bust in marble the following year in her studio in Rome, where she and her husband were then living. Later in life, she brought the piece with her to Texas, where it was held for a time after her death by the Fort Worth Art Museum (now the Modern Art Museum of Fort Worth). Today it is displayed in the Elisabet Ney Museum in Austin, Texas.

Ney's relationship with Garibaldi continued after the portrait's completion. In the summer of 1866, as Garibaldi led his Hunters of the Alps fighting against Austria in the Third Italian War of Independence, Ney and her husband were staying in Austrian Tyrol; after Ney's death, her long-time housekeeper revealed that Ney acted as an intelligence source in enemy territory for Garibaldi during this time, feeding him information in a secret correspondence. Some historians have speculated that Ney's covert work for Garibaldi may have led to her next major artistic commission, a portrait bust of Prussian Chancellor Otto von Bismarck (Garibaldi's ally in the war against Austria).

== Design ==
The sculpture is a portrait bust, 20.75 inches (52.7 cm) high, rendered in marble. Garibaldi is depicted in his late fifties, with his characteristic long hair and full, curly beard. The figure is unclothed, showing the subject's bare shoulders and upper chest, and the name "GIUSEPPE GARIBALDI" is inscribed in the front of the base. The figure's pose is neutral, and the facial expression is distant with unincised eyes, reflecting Ney's neoclassical training and sensibilities.
