= Statue of Stephen F. Austin =

Sculpture of Stephen F. Austin by Elisabet Ney

- (Austin, Texas)
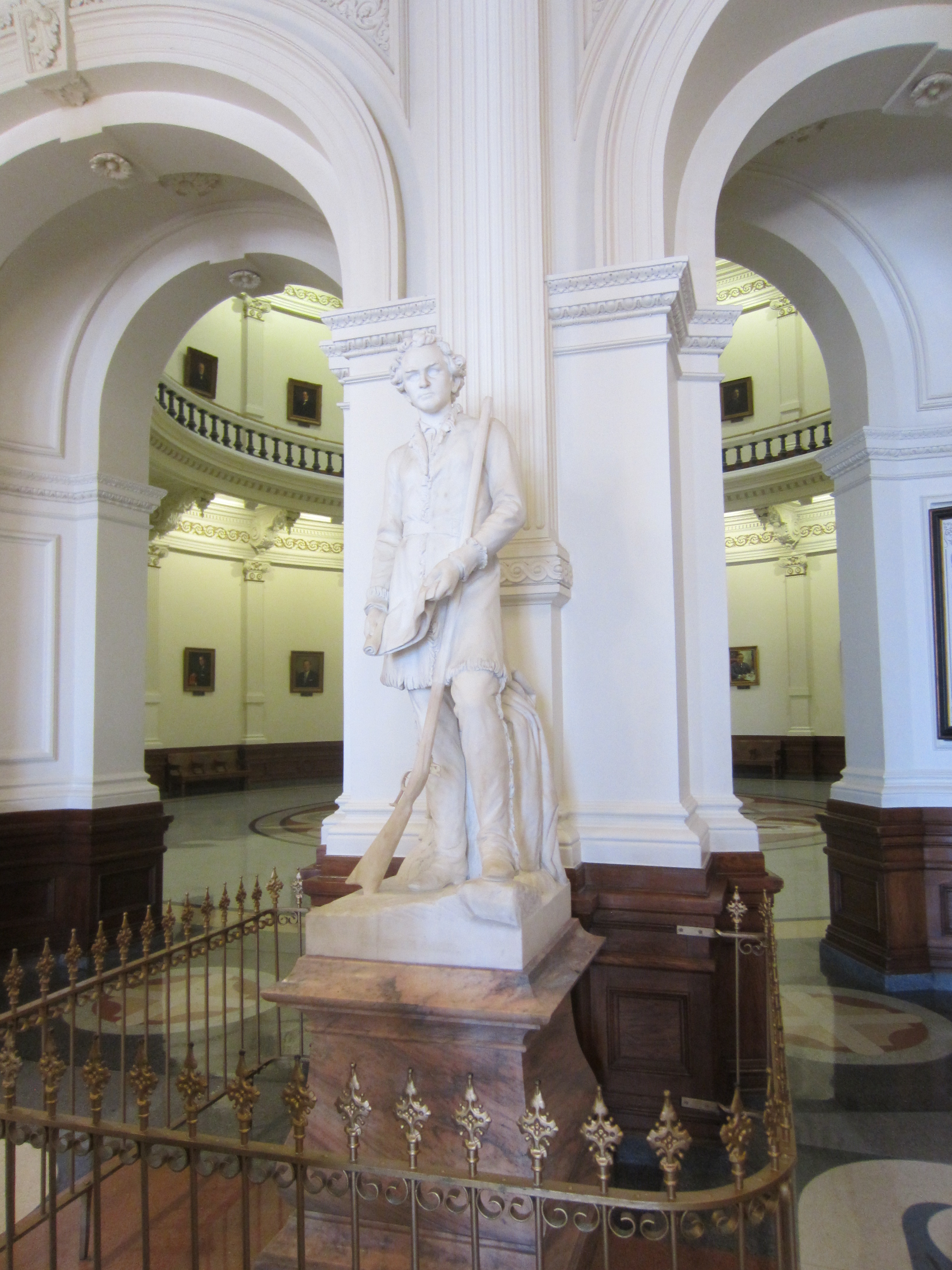
- The statue in the Texas State Capitol
- Artist: Elisabet Ney
- Year: 1903
- Medium: Marble sculpture
- Subject: Stephen F. Austin
- Dimensions: 194 cm (76.5 in)
- Location: Texas State Capitol; Austin, Texas, United States

Statue of Stephen F. Austin
- (Washington, D.C.)
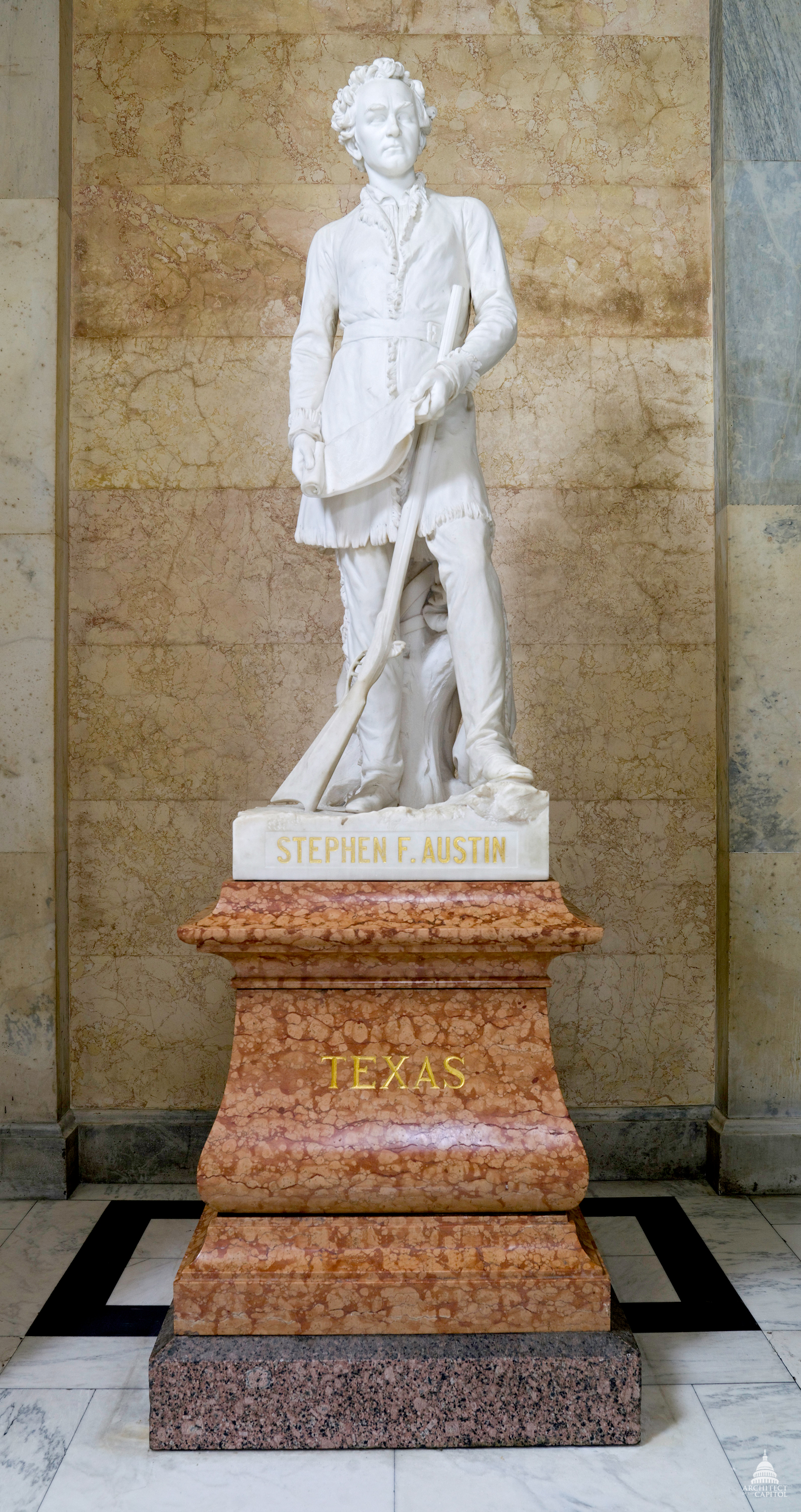
- The statue in the National Statuary Hall Collection
- Artist: Elisabet Ney
- Year: 1905
- Medium: Marble sculpture
- Subject: Stephen F. Austin
- Dimensions: 194 cm (76.5 in)
- Location: National Statuary Hall Collection; Washington, D.C., United States

Stephen F. Austin is a statue of Stephen F. Austin by Elisabet Ney, originally modeled in 1893.

Two carvings exist: one installed in 1903 in the Texas State Capitol, and the other installed in 1905 as one of the two statues from Texas in the National Statuary Hall Collection in the United States Capitol in Washington, D.C. In each case it is accompanied by a second statue, Sam Houston, also by Ney and produced in parallel.

== History ==
In early 1892, the Texas government was preparing materials for a building at the World's Columbian Exposition to be held the following year in Chicago. Texas Governor Oran Milo Roberts recommended that the women's commission charged with fundraising for the exhibit speak with Elisabet Ney, a German–American sculptor residing in Austin, Texas. After a meeting, Ney was invited to sculpt portrait statues of Sam Houston and Stephen F. Austin for the exhibit, though the commission had no funds to pay the artist for her work. Ney agreed and went to work first on the statue of Houston; she began work on Austin's statue in early 1893 and completed a plaster rendering of Austin by that fall.

The statue of Austin was completed too late to be displayed in Chicago, but Ney and the women's commission intended to cut editions of the Houston and Austin statues in marble for permanent display in the Texas State Capitol. It took years to secure the necessary funding, but in 1901 the Texas Legislature appropriated the funds for the carving, and the two statues were unveiled in the Texas Capitol on January 19, 1903. An additional copy of each statue was cut for submission to the National Statuary Hall Collection and unveiled in the United States Capitol in 1905.

== Design ==
Stephen F. Austin is a full-length statue in marble. It shows Austin standing on slightly uneven ground with his left foot forward, looking up and ahead into the distance. The lowered hands hold a partially unrolled scroll, meant to represent a map, while a Kentucky long rifle leans against the left hip and leg. Austin is portrayed as a young explorer dressed in fringed buckskins. The front face of the self base (the marble platform on which the figure stands) is inscribed "STEPHEN F. AUSTIN".

Ney used authentic period objects for reference in developing the details of the sculpture, including the long rifle and scroll map. When critics complained that the Houston statue was 6 feet 2 inches (188 cm) tall while the Austin statue was only 5 feet 7 inches (170 cm), she replied that these had been the actual heights of the men, and that anyone objecting should "take the issue up not with her but with God."

== See also ==
- List of public art in Austin, Texas
