= Statue of Sam Houston (Ney) =

Sculpture by Elisabet Ney in two versions

Sam Houston
- (Austin, Texas)
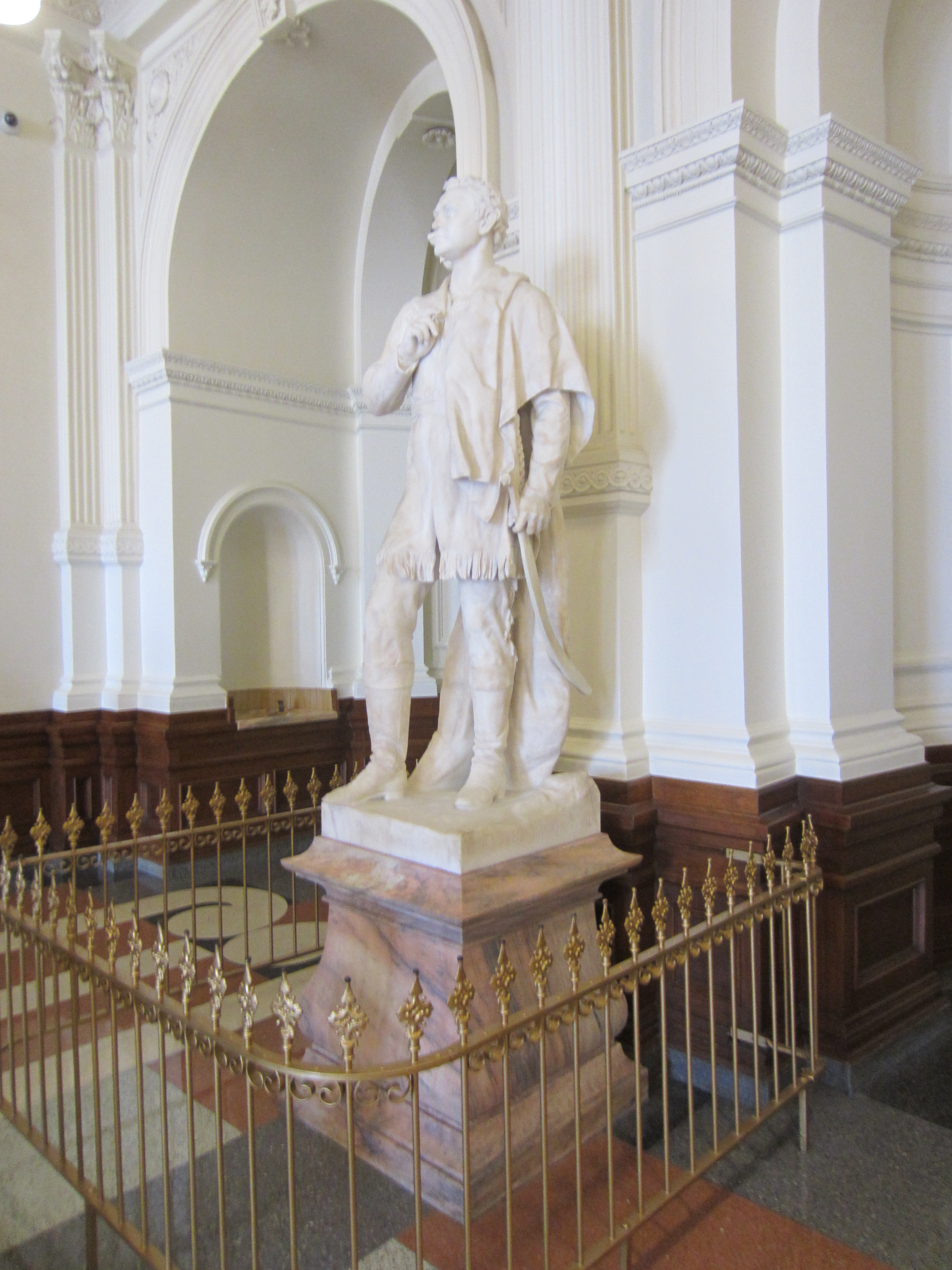
- The statue in the Texas State Capitol
- Artist: Elisabet Ney
- Year: 1903
- Medium: Marble sculpture
- Subject: Sam Houston
- Dimensions: 210 cm (82.5 in)
- Location: Texas State Capitol; Austin, Texas, United States

Sam Houston
- (Washington, D.C.)
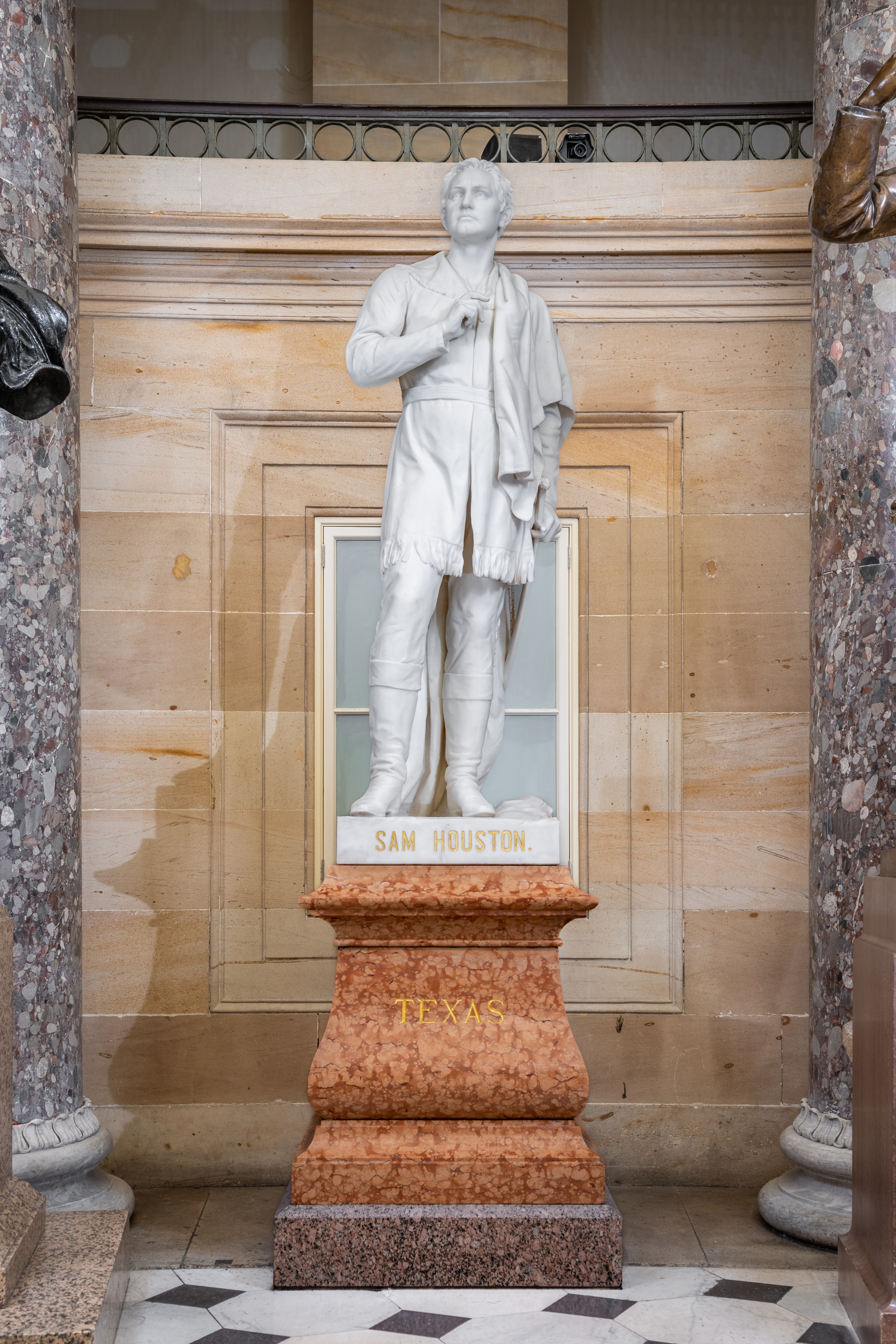
- The statue at the National Statuary Hall in 2023
- Artist: Elisabet Ney
- Year: 1905
- Medium: Marble sculpture
- Subject: Sam Houston
- Dimensions: 210 cm (82.5 in)
- Location: National Statuary Hall Collection; Washington, D.C., United States

Sam Houston is a statue of Sam Houston by Elisabet Ney, originally modeled in 1892.

Two carvings exist: one installed in 1903 in the Texas State Capitol, and the other installed in 1905 as one of the two statues from Texas in the National Statuary Hall Collection in the United States Capitol in Washington, D.C. In each case it is accompanied by a second statue, Stephen F. Austin, also by Ney and produced in parallel.

== History ==
In early 1892, the Texas government was preparing materials for a building at the World's Columbian Exposition to be held the following year in Chicago. Texas Governor Oran Milo Roberts recommended that the women's commission charged with fundraising for the exhibit speak with Elisabet Ney, a German–American sculptor residing in Austin, Texas. After a meeting, Ney was invited to sculpt portrait statues of Sam Houston and Stephen F. Austin for the exhibit, though the commission had no funds to pay the artist for her work. Ney agreed and went to work first on the statue of Houston; by April 1892 she had completed a clay model of the piece and invited some of Houston's family and friends to preview it and assess the likeness. By the following July a plaster rendering of Houston had been finished, and the statue was publicly displayed in Ney's studio (now the Elisabet Ney Museum) prior to its transportation to Chicago for the Exposition.

The statue of Austin was completed too late to be displayed in Chicago, but the Houston statue was well received, with the Exposition's Art Commission even offering the piece a space in the main fine arts building. After the conclusion of the Exposition, Ney and the women's commission intended to cut editions of the Houston and Austin statues in marble for permanent display in the Texas State Capitol, but it took years to secure the necessary funding. In 1901 the Texas Legislature appropriated the funds for the carving, and the two statues were unveiled in the Texas Capitol on January 19, 1903. An additional copy of each statue was cut for submission to the National Statuary Hall Collection and unveiled in the United States Capitol in 1905.

== Design ==
Sam Houston is a full-length statue in marble. It shows Houston standing on slightly uneven ground with his right foot forward, looking up and ahead into the distance. The right hand is held across the chest, while the left rests on the hilt of a saber hanging at the left hip. Houston is portrayed as a young pioneer, dressed in fringed buckskins and calf-length boots, with a Native American sarape thrown over his left shoulder. The front face of the self base (the marble platform on which the figure stands) is inscribed "SAM HOUSTON."

In composing the piece, Ney borrowed Houston's actual saber from his daughter, Maggie Williams, and rendered the weapon in authentic detail. The sarape was also a recreation of a characteristic piece of Houston's wardrobe, modeled on a similar blanket that Ney located for reference. When critics complained that the Houston statue was 6 feet 2 inches (188 cm) tall while the Austin statue was only 5 feet 7 inches (170 cm), she replied that these had been the actual heights of the men, and that anyone objecting should "take the issue up not with her but with God".

== See also ==
- List of public art in Austin, Texas
