= Ray Sadler =

American baseball player (born 1980)

- Outfielder
- Born: September 19, 1980 (age 45); Clifton, Texas, U.S.
- Batted: Right Threw: Right

MLB debut
- May 8, 2005, for the Pittsburgh Pirates

Last MLB appearance
- May 11, 2005, for the Pittsburgh Pirates

MLB statistics
- Batting average: .250
- Home runs: 1
- Runs batted in: 1
- Stats at Baseball Reference

Teams
- Pittsburgh Pirates (2005)

Raymond Lee Sadler (born September 19, 1980) is an American former professional baseball outfielder. He played in Major League Baseball in 2005 for the Pittsburgh Pirates. Sadler bats and throws right handed. His cousin Donnie Sadler has also played Major League Baseball.

== Professional career ==
Sadler played baseball at Clifton High School, and in 1999 the Chicago Cubs selected him with the 920th pick of the June draft, as part of the 30th round. The Cubs did so with the intention of treating him as a "draft and follow" player, and he signed with the Cubs after 2 seasons at Hill College, a junior college in Hillsboro, Texas.

Sadler was traded from the Cubs to the Pittsburgh Pirates on August 17, 2003, in a deadline deal for Randall Simon. When outfielder Craig Wilson injured a tendon in his hand on May 8, 2005, the Pirates turned to Sadler as an emergency replacement, purchasing his contract from the Altoona Curve. He had no time to prepare, but reported immediately to the Pirates' clubhouse, where he was mistaken for a construction worker by surprised manager Lloyd McClendon. Sadler made his major league debut that night, and three days later, he collected his first major league hit: a home run to left field against Giants starter Noah Lowry.

After playing three games in left field, Sadler was optioned back down to the minors on May 13, and he was designated for assignment on September 16. This was the first outright assignment of Sadler's career, so he remained with the Pirates organization after clearing waivers. After the 2006 season, Sadler was acquired by the Houston Astros organization. He played the entire 2007 season as a member of the Corpus Christi Hooks, Houston's AA affiliate, leading the team in home runs and runs batted in while earning Team MVP honors. In 2008, Sadler split time between Corpus Christi and the Triple-A Round Rock Express in the Astros' system.

Sadler became a free agent at the end of the 2008 season and signed a minor league contract with the Tampa Bay Rays in December. On August 6, 2009, Sadler was released by the Rays, and signed a minor league contract with the Houston Astros two days later. He became a free agent again after the season, and in 2010 signed with the Kansas City T-Bones of the independent Northern League. He played for the club in the 2011 season as well.

Sadler played for the Kansas City T-Bones of the American Association of Independent Professional Baseball in 2012. In 2013, Sadler played for the Winnipeg Goldeyes and T-Bones of the American Association of Independent Professional Baseball. Sadler played for the Goldeyes and T-Bones during the 2014 season as well and played for the Sussex County Miners in 2015.
