= Ross Volunteers =

Military escort of the governor of Texas

- Ross Volunteer personnel pictured in 2014 during the Battle of Flowers Parade during Fiesta San Antonio.
- Active: 1887 - present
- Country: United States
- Allegiance: Governor of Texas
- Type: Honor Guard
- Role: Public duties
- Part of: Texas A&M University Corps of Cadets
- Garrison/HQ: College Station, Texas
- Nickname: RVs
- Mottos: "Soldier, Statesman, Knightly Gentleman"

The Ross Volunteer Company (commonly known as the Ross Volunteers or the RVs) is the military escort of the governor of Texas and a unit of the Texas A&M Corps of Cadets.

== History ==
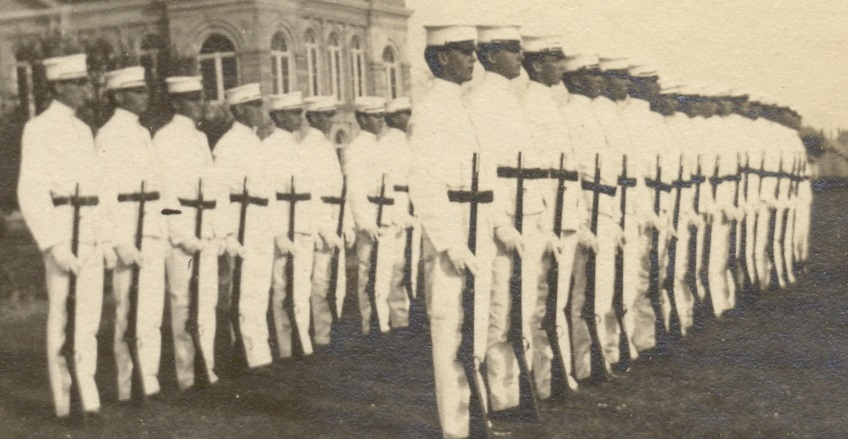
The Ross Volunteer Company pictured in 1920.

=== Establishment and early history ===
The Ross Volunteers were established as a military drill team at the A&M College of Texas in 1887 under the name Scott Volunteers, honoring Col. Thomas M. Scott, the college's business manager. In 1891 the name of the unit was changed to the Ross Volunteers in honor of the college president at the time, Lawrence Sullivan Ross, and later changed to the Foster Guards under the presidency of L. L. Foster, and then the Houston Rifles under the presidency of David F. Houston. In 1905 the name was permanently set as the Ross Volunteers, when Henry Harrington, the son-in-law of Ross, was president.

=== Later history ===
The unit was dormant during World War II but was reactivated in 1948. Among its first public engagements following its reconstitution was to escort Governor of Texas Beauford Jester and General Jonathan Wainwright to that year's Texas A&M vs University of Texas football game; the bearing and discipline of the unit was remarked upon by Wainwright. In 1950 the unit was named military escort to the governor of Texas, a role it continues to perform. In 1985, the Ross Volunteers were opened to female participation following a federal court order.

During the state funeral of George H. W. Bush, the Ross Volunteers formed the guard of honor during the removal of the casket from Bush's funeral train upon its arrival in College Station, Texas. The Ross Volunteers are the oldest cadet organization in existence at Texas A&M University, though the now defunct Stephen F. Austin Literary Society and the Calliopean Society were founded earlier. It has marched in the inaugural parades of Presidents Ronald Reagan (1981), George H. W. Bush (1989), and George W. Bush (2001 and 2005).

== Uniforms ==
Since inception, the uniform of the Ross Volunteers has consisted of white trousers and blouses with gold trim, worn with peaked hats. (Note: From 1907-1908 an alternate uniform was worn, and the unit briefly used tin helmets as cover in lieu of peaked hats.) Officers wear a distinctive, crimson waist sash.

== Organization ==
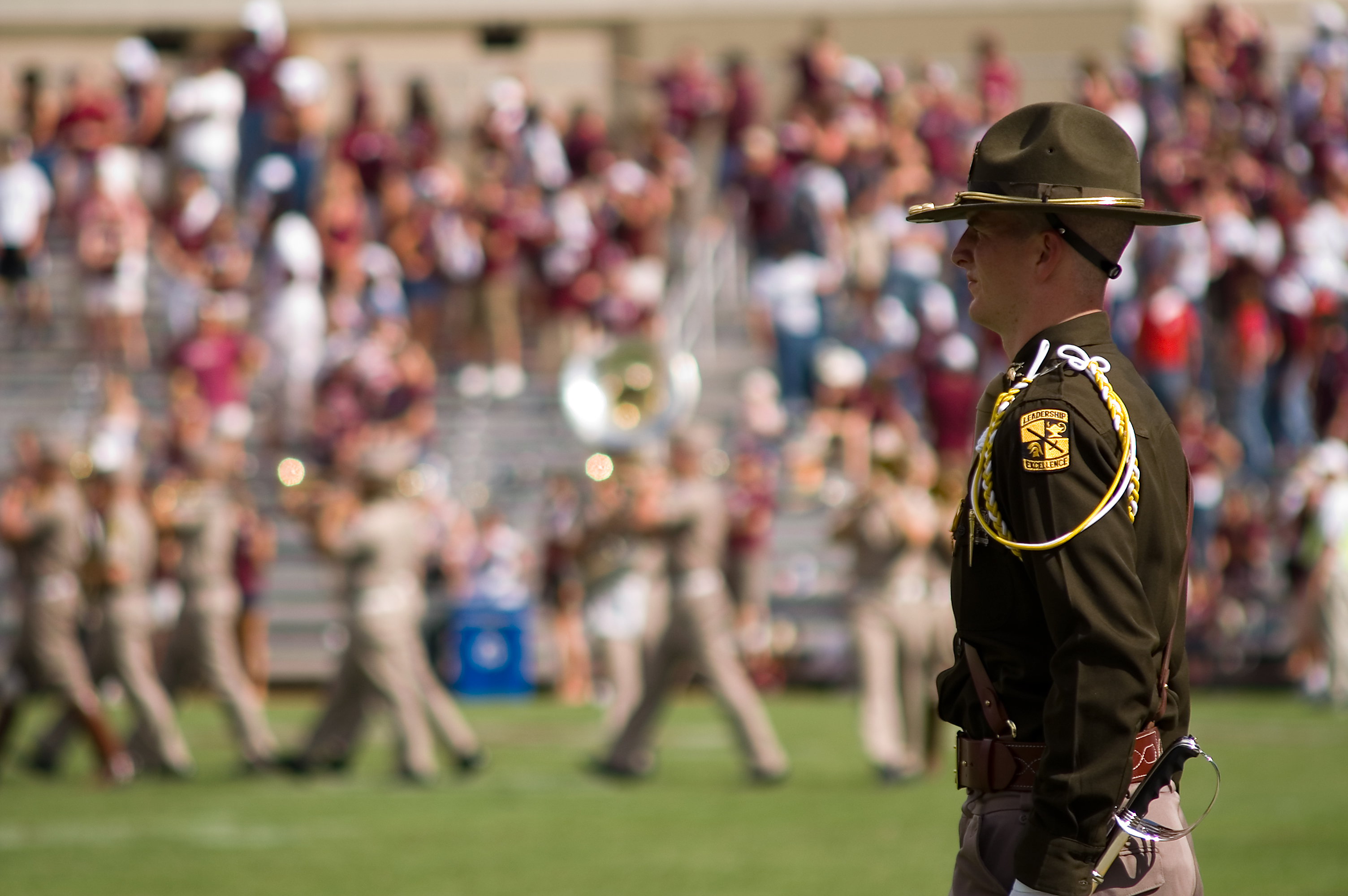
A cadet in the Class A Midnights uniform with the RV cord, indicating membership in the company.

The command of the company consists of the following individuals:

- Commanding Officer
- Executive Officer
- First Sergeant
- Staff Officers
  - Administration
  - Operations
  - Public Relations
  - Historian
  - Armorer

The unit is broken into three of the following platoons based on height:

- Tree Platoon
- Meatball Platoon
- Squat Platoon

Each platoon is further subdivided into four squads.

== Notable personnel ==
- Henry Cisneros, 10th United States Secretary of Housing and Urban Development and former Mayor of San Antonio.
- General Eric Smith, 39th Commandant of the United States Marine Corps
- George F. Moore, commander of the Philippine Coast Artillery during the Battle of Bataan.
- Brigadier General Jake Betty, Commanding General of the Texas State Guard from 2014-2017
- Andrew Davis Bruce, 3rd President of the University of Houston
- Pat Olsen, engineer and namesake of Olsen Field at Blue Bell Park
- Tyson Voelkel, President of the Texas A&M Foundation and Corps Commander from 1995-1996.
- Bill Flores, U.S. Representative for Texas's 17th congressional district from 2011 to 2021.
- Lieutenant General Ormond R. Simpson, commanding general of 1st Marine Division during Vietnam War and deputy chief of staff for manpower at Headquarters Marine Corps.
- Joseph W. Ashy, a retired United States Air Force (USAF) general who was commander in chief of North American Aerospace Defense Command and United States Space Command.
- Michael L. Downs, former Vice Director of the Joint Staff and associate director for military affairs of the Central Intelligence Agency.
- Major General Frank Lozano '93, Company D-2, Commanding Officer
- Brigadier General Jim Lively '96, Squat Platoon Leader
- Major General Todd Erskine '96, Company B-2, Commanding Officer

== Ross Volunteer Association ==
Due to the efforts of RV alumni such as General Jake Betty and Colonel Byron Stebbins, the Ross Volunteer Association (RVA) was established in 2009 to support the RVs.

== See also ==
- 3rd Infantry Regiment
- National Lancers
- Texas Military Forces
