= Clifton High School (Clifton, Texas) =

High school in Clifton, Texas, United States

Location
- 1101 North Avenue Q Clifton, Bosque County, Texas 76634-1029; United States; 31.788671°N 97.590608°W

Information
- School type: Public, high school
- Locale: Town: Distant
- School district: Clifton ISD
- NCES School ID: 481440000931
- Principal: Jimmy Jackson
- Teaching staff: 27.68 (on an FTE basis)
- Grades: 9‍–‍12
- Enrollment: 314 (2023‍–‍2024)
- Student to teacher ratio: 11.34
- Colors: Kelly Green, White & Black
- Athletics conference: UIL Class AAA
- Mascot: Cubs/Lady Cubs
- Yearbook: The Old Mill
- Website: Clifton High School

Clifton High School (CHS) is a public high school located in Clifton, Texas, United States, and classified as a 3A school by the University Interscholastic League. It is part of the Clifton Independent School District located in southern Bosque County. During 2022‍–‍2023, Clifton High School had an enrollment of 312 students and a student to teacher ratio of 11.06. The school received an overall rating of "B" from the Texas Education Agency for the 2024‍–‍2025 school year

== Academics ==
In 2010, CHS students passed the TAKS at rates above that of the state average in all subjects, having 100% passing rates in Grade 11 Social Studies and Grade 11 English Language Arts.

CHS offers extensive dual credit (dual enrollment) course opportunities. Dual credit courses are college courses which provide both high school and college credit. At CHS, these courses are typically offered from University of Texas Permian Basin or Hill College.

== Athletics ==
The Clifton Cubs and Lady Cubs compete in the following sports:

- Baseball
- Basketball
- Cross Country
- Football
- Golf
- Powerlifting
- Softball
- Tennis
- Track and Field
- Volleyball

The CHS athletic program is currently under the leadership of athletic director and head football coach, Brent Finney. The school's teams compete in state championship series tournaments sponsored by the UIL.

=== UIL District Alignment (2022-2023) ===
For football, CHS competes in Conference 3A, Division II, Region 4, District 13:

- Clifton High School
- Buffalo High School
- Elkhart High School
- Lexington High School
- Florence High School
- Rogers High School

For other sports, CHS competes in Conference 3A, Region 3, District 17:

- Clifton High School
- Grandview High School
- Harmony School of Innovation-Waco
- Keene High School
- Maypearl High School
- West High School
- Whitney High School

==== State Bound ====
- Football -
  - 1967(1A)
- Marching Band -
- Appearances: 1982, 1983, 1984, 1986, 1987, 1990, 1991, 1993, 1995, 2001. 2007. 2011. 2014. 2015, 2017, 2019, 2023
- Finals: 1990, 1991, 1993, 1995, 2005, 2007, 2009, 2011, 2013, 2015, 2017, 2023

https://realignment.uiltexas.org/alignments/2020/3AVB2020.pdf

In 1995, the women's volleyball team lost to Jewett Leon (Scores: 15-9; 15-7) in the conference 2A state semi-finals.

== Activities ==
CHS offers a variety of extracurricular activities and promotes student involvement. These activities include:

- UIL Academic Competitions
  - Marching Band
  - Theater (One Act Play)
  - Journalism
  - Speech
  - Debate
  - Science
  - Math
  - English/Literature
- National Honor Society
- L.I.F.E. (Christian Student Organization)
- Student Council
- FFA
- Cheerleading
- Interact (Rotary International)
- Robotics Team
  - BEST Robotics
  - FIRST Lego League Challenge

== Traditions ==
- After winning home football games, each player on the Clifton High School football team takes a turn ringing the victory bell on the north side of Cub Stadium.
- The victory bell on the north side of Cub Stadium is rung by each graduating senior immediately after the graduation ceremony.
- The Clifton High School Fight Song is to the tune of the Notre Dame Victory March. The CHS Fight Song is played frequently at football games, pep-rallies and graduation. Clifton High School does not have words for the CHS Fight Song.
- The Clifton High School Song is an original composition by a Clifton High School student. This song is a slow ballad. With the accompaniment of the CHS band, it is typically sung at all football games and pep-rallies, as well as graduation.

=== Clifton High School song ===
Clifton High School we love you
And your glory we shall sing;
Memories of you we will cherish
And praises to you we will bring

Forever you banner we'll wave
With pride we'll hold it high;
We stand by your side Clifton High School
We'll laud your name to the sky

And in the books of fame
In gold we'll write your name;
We love you, C.H.S.

The Clifton High School yearbook is called "The Old Mill," named after a historic mill built in Clifton on the Bosque River after the American Civil War.

== Notable alumni ==
- Bobby Joe Conrad - former NFL player
- Bernie Erickson - former NFL player
- Josh Grelle - voice actor
- Ray Sadler - former Major League Baseball player
