= Bernie Erickson =

American football player (born 1944)

No. 62, 50
- Position: Linebacker

Personal information
- Born: October 16, 1944 (age 82); Clifton, Texas, U.S.
- Listed height: 6 ft 2 in (1.88 m)
- Listed weight: 240 lb (109 kg)

Career information
- High school: Clifton
- College: Abilene Christian (1963–1966)
- NFL draft: 1967: 5th round, 121st overall pick

Career history
- San Diego Chargers (1967–1968); Cincinnati Bengals (1968)

Career AFL statistics
- Interceptions: 1
- Sacks: 0.5
- Stats at Pro Football Reference

John Bernard Erickson (born October 16, 1944) is an American former professional football player who was a linebacker for two seasons in the American Football League (AFL) with the San Diego Chargers and Cincinnati Bengals. He was selected by the Chargers in the fifth round of the 1967 NFL/AFL draft after playing college football at Abilene Christian College.

== Early life and college ==
John Bernard Erickson was born on October 16, 1944, in Clifton, Texas. He attended Clifton High School in Clifton.

He was a member of the Abilene Christian Wildcats of Abilene Christian College from 1963 to 1966.

== Professional career ==
Erickson was selected by the San Diego Chargers in the fifth round, with the 121st overall pick, of the 1967 NFL/AFL draft. He played in 13 games, starting one, for the Chargers in 1967, recording one interception. He appeared in eight games, starting four, for the team during the 1968 season, posting 0.5 sacks, before being released on November 6, 1968.

Erickson signed with the Cincinnati Bengals on November 9, 1968. He played in five games, starting three, for the Bengals during their inaugural season in 1968. He was released in 1969.
