= Merritt Mauzey =

Merritt Mauzey (1897-1973) was an American lithographer and noted children’s book author and illustrator in the mid-20th century. Associated closely with the Dallas Nine group of artists, Mauzey was a self-taught artist known for his depictions of rural life and the cotton industry in his native Texas.

== Early life ==
Merritt Thomas Mauzey was born November 16, 1897, in Clifton, Texas,. He was the last of nine children born to Henry Clay Mauzey, a Civil War veteran who fought for the Union army, and Amanda Crow Mauzey. The family moved to Oak Creek, south of Sweetwater, Texas, in 1900 to sharecrop cotton; two years later, they bought 160 acres in Decker, a nearby community in Nolan County, to expand their cotton crops. At age 15, Mauzey moved in with a married sister to attend high school in the town of Blackwell. During this time, he took a correspondence class through the Fine Art Institute of Omaha, Nebraska.

Mauzey married Margaret Echols in 1916; their only child, Merritt Jr., was born three years later. In 1920, the new family moved to Sweetwater, the nearest large town, and in 1927 relocated to Dallas, where Mauzey worked as a clerk at a cotton exporting firm.

== Career ==
=== Printmaking ===
Mauzey began studying etching with North Texas printmaker Frank Klepper and life drawing with Dallas Morning News cartoonist John Knott at Dallas Public Evening School at Dallas High School in 1933. A close associate of the Dallas Nine group of Texas Regionalist artists, Mauzey was a charter member of the experimental Lone Star Printmakers group, which formed in 1938. He bought a lithographic press to print his own work and that of his colleagues, leaving his position at the cotton exporting firm to teach lithography and devote more time to his artwork.

Mauzey soon emerged as the “outstanding talent” among the Lone Star Printmakers. The group, whose ranks included notable Texas artists Alexandre Hogue, Otis Dozier, and Dallas Museum of Fine Arts director Jerry Bywaters, showed their work in exhibitions that toured throughout Texas and sold limited edition prints for $5 to $8 each. The Lone Star Printmakers also sold work through noted art historian Carl Zigrosser’s Weyhe Gallery in New York. In 1942, Mauzey was profiled in Zigrosser’s book, The Artist in America: Twenty-four Close-Ups of Contemporary Printmaking. By then a curator at Philadelphia Museum of Art, Zigrosser described Mauzey as "a kind of Rousseau among lithographers" and his work as the “translation of cotton into art”

From 1943 to 1962, Mauzey worked full-time at Firestone Rubber Company and devoted his free time to his art. Suffering from exhaustion and a bleeding ulcer, Mauzey was frequently ill and required hospitalization on numerous occasions. Though Regionalism’s popularity waned after World War II, Mauzey continued to produce prints and focused his efforts on creating children’s books illustrated with his lithography. Between 1955 and 1964, he wrote and illustrated six popular children’s books about farming and rural life.

=== Awards and exhibitions ===
Mauzey had two paintings, Cotton Gin and Cotton Compress, selected for the 1936 Texas Centennial Exposition art exhibition in Dallas; in 1939 alone, his work was also shown at the New York World's Fair, New York Cotton Exchange, Dallas Cotton Exchange, Golden Gate International Exposition in San Francisco, and a solo exhibition at Delphic Studios in New York. In 1942, his work was shown in the Artists for Victory exhibition at the Metropolitan Museum of Art and exhibited at the Pennsylvania Academy of the Fine Arts in 1944. In 1946, Mauzey was the first Texan to be awarded a Guggenheim Fellowship in Fine Arts and spent two months as an artist-in-residence at the Colorado Springs Fine Arts Center studying under printmaker Lawrence Barrett. In 1948, he won the K.F.J. Knoblock Award from the Society of American Graphic Artists.

=== Death and legacy ===
Mauzey died November 14, 1973, in Dallas and is buried at Restland Cemetery beside his wife, Maggie, who died five years earlier. His funeral was held at University Park United Methodist Church, of which he was a charter member. A lifelong Methodist and self-identified “progressive Democrat,” Mauzey was also a Freemason and a member of American Graphic Artists and Audubon Artists, Inc. His autobiography, An Artist’s Notebook: The Life and Art of Merritt Mauzey, was published posthumously in 1979. The Merritt Mauzey Papers are held by the University of Southern Mississippi.

Though the popularity of Regionalist art fluctuates over time, Mauzey's work documents an important period of rural life in Texas and is held in major institutions throughout the United States. Mauzey donated or sold over 1,000 prints and sketches to at least 50 institutions across the country, and his work can be found in the collections of the Library of Congress, Art Institute of Chicago, Metropolitan Museum of Art, Smithsonian American Art Museum, Dallas Museum of Art, and the Washington County Museum of Fine Arts.

== Publications ==
- The Land of Beginning Again: The Romance of the Brazos (1952) (as illustrator)
- Texas Ranch Boy (1955)
- Cotton-Farm Boy (1958)
- Oilfield Boy (1959)
- Rice Boy (1960)
- Rubber Boy (1962)
- Salt Boy (1964)
- The Catalogue of Merritt Mauzey Collection in the Library of the University of Southern Mississippi (1972)
- An Artist's Notebook: The Life and Art of Merritt Mauzey (1979)
