= Bobby Joe Conrad =

American football player (born 1935)

No. 40
- Positions: Wide receiver, defensive back, halfback, placekicker

Personal information
- Born: November 17, 1935 (age 91); Clifton, Texas, U.S.
- Listed height: 6 ft 2 in (1.88 m)
- Listed weight: 194 lb (88 kg)

Career information
- High school: Clifton
- College: Texas A&M (1954–1957)
- NFL draft: 1958: 5th round, 58th overall pick

Career history
- New York Giants (1958)*; Chicago/St. Louis Cardinals (1958–1968); Dallas Cowboys (1969)
- * Offseason or practice squad member only

Awards and highlights
- First-team All-Pro (1963); Pro Bowl (1964); NFL receptions leader (1963)

Career NFL statistics
- Receptions: 422
- Receiving yards: 5,902
- Receiving touchdowns: 38
- Stats at Pro Football Reference

Bobby Joe Conrad (born November 17, 1935) is an American former professional football player who was a wide receiver in the National Football League (NFL) for the Chicago/St. Louis Cardinals and Dallas Cowboys. He played college football for the Texas A&M Aggies. Conrad was known for his versatility. With the Aggies he played halfback, quarterback, fullback and end on offense, and defensive back. On special teams he was a punter, kicked off, and kicked extra point conversions; as well as being both a kickoff and punt returner. During his early years with the Cardinals, he played defensive back and running back before establishing himself at wide receiver; while also serving on special teams as a kickoff and punt returner, place kicker, and handling kickoffs.

In 1963, Conrad led the NFL with 73 receptions and was named first-team All-Pro by the Associated Press (AP) and United Press International (UPI). He was selected to play in the Pro Bowl the following season. In 1968, he set a then-NFL record by having at least one reception in 94 consecutive games; a streak that began in 1961. He played in 148 consecutive games for the Cardinals, never missing a game; and played in a total of 156 NFL games, never missing a game due to injury.

== Early life ==
Conrad was born on November 17, 1935, in the small town of Clifton, Texas. He attended Clifton High School, where he was an All-State quarterback, while leading the team to back-to-back District Championships in 1952 and 1953. In an unusual play during one game, he threw a pass that was blocked by a defensive lineman and Conrad caught the ball when it came back at him for an eight yard loss; being both the passer and receiver on the same play.

Conrad was the first player from Clifton High to be named All-State. He was also named All-District and District Most Valuable Player in 1952 and 1953. As a senior, he scored 207 points and took Clifton to the state semifinals where they lost to the eventual state champion Ranger High School. In 2006, he was inducted into the Texas High School Football Hall of Fame.

== College career ==
Conrad accepted a football scholarship from Texas A&M University to play with the Aggies under head coach Bear Bryant in the Southwest Conference (SWC). He was in Bryant's first recruiting class at Texas A&M, and but for Bryant's becoming the Aggies' coach, Conrad was planning to attend Texas Christian University. He was a two-way player at halfback, quarterback, fullback, and end on offense; and at defensive back. Conrad also was used as a punter and punt returner for the Aggies; and for kickoffs and extra point conversions as a kicker, and as a kickoff returner. He was a member of the school's 1956 SWC Championship team.

Conrad never was a full-time starter in Bryant's offense that used multiple running backs and quarterbacks; with Conrad often used as a substitute running back. As a sophomore (1955), Conrad had 182 rushing yards in 34 carries. He was ninth on the team in carries, sixth in total rushing yards, and third in yards per carry (5.4). In a 1955 game against Baylor, he played fived different offensive positions (end, quarterback, right halfback, left halfback, and fullback).

As a junior (1956), Conrad was sixth in carries (32), seventh in total rushing yards (123), and ninth in yards per carry (3.8); with two rushing touchdowns. He also had two receptions that season. In a late September game against the LSU Tigers, Conrad passed for a touchdown in the Aggies 9–6 win. The following week he scored two rushing touchdowns from the quarterback position in a victory over Texas Tech. In an early November game against the SMU Mustangs, he intercepted a pass and then carried the ball as a running back when the Aggies took over on offense; also kicking an extra point conversion in the same game. The 1956 Aggies had a 9–0–1 record, won the SWC title, and were ranked fifth nationally by the Associated Press (AP) at the end of that football season.

In 1957, the Aggies were 8–3, and finished ninth in the final AP poll. During the regular season, Conrad was fifth on the team in total rushing yards (213), seventh in carries (40), but first in yards per carry (5.3). He also had five receptions for 82 yards. In an early October game against Missouri, Conrad ran a kickoff back 91 yards for a touchdown. The Aggies lost to the Tennessee Volunteers, 3–0, in the 1957 Gator Bowl.

During his college career (1955 to 1957), Conrad had a 4.9 yards per carry rushing average, in 106 attempts. One of his teammates was 1957 Heisman Trophy winner John David Crow, who had 1,465 yards in 295 attempts over the same period. He and Crow would go on to play as teammates in the NFL from 1958 to 1964. He teammates at Texas A&M also included future NFL All-Pro players Jack Pardee and Charlie Krueger.

Conrad participated in the 1958 Chicago College All-Star Game. Although he had never attempted a field goal in college, he was able to make four field goals in the game, along with three extra point conversions; tying the All-Star Game's scoring record with 15 points. His 44-yard field goal was the longest ever by a college all-star in the game at the time. Conrad also intercepted one pass as a safety, and called his team's defensive signals. The collegians upset the 1957 NFL Champion Detroit Lions, 35–19.

== Professional career ==
=== New York Giants ===
The New York Giants traded for the Baltimore Colts' fifth round draft pick in 1958. The Giants selected Conrad with that pick in the 1958 NFL draft, 58th overall. He was drafted to play defensive back and signed by Giants' defensive coach Tom Landry (a future Hall of Fame head coach). On May 10, Conrad was traded along with safety Dick Nolan to the Chicago Cardinals, in exchange for end Pat Summerall and halfback Lindon Crow.

=== Chicago / St. Louis Cardinals ===
Conrad showed similar versatility in professional football to what he did in college. During his early years with the Cardinals, he played defensive back, running back, and wide receiver; while serving on special teams as a kickoff and punt returner, place kicker, and handled kickoffs. In 1958 as a rookie, he was a starter at defensive back and had four interceptions and one fumble recovery. Three of his interceptions came in a single game against the Pittsburgh Steelers and quarterback Bobby Layne. On special teams, he made six out of 17 field goal attempts and returned 19 punts for 129 yards (6.8 yards per return).

In 1959, he was moved to the offensive backfield at right halfback (flanker), playing alongside college teammate John David Crow at left halfback. Conrad started all 12 games that season, with 74 carries for 328 rushing yards and two rushing touchdowns; and 14 receptions for 142 yards, with three receiving touchdowns. He made six out of nine field goal attempts. Conrad also had 18 kickoff returns for 388 yards and 16 punt returns for 133 yards (8.3-yard average) with one touchdown. On September 27, 1959, in the season's first game, Conrad rushed for 140 yards on only 11 carries, with two rushing touchdowns and one receiving touchdown; including 56-yard and 35-yard runs for touchdowns. He successfully kicked seven extra point conversions (including after his own three touchdowns), and had 25 points in the game. On November 22, 1959, Conrad returned a punt 69 yards for a touchdown against the New York Giants.

The Cardinals moved to St. Louis before the 1960 NFL season began. Conrad started only two games that season, playing behind Joe Childress and alternating at right halfback; and was considered a top-flight pass receiver. He had 91 yards in 23 rushing attempts, and seven receptions for 103 yards. Conrad returned eight punts for 86 yards, and 12 kickoffs for 338 yards. He made two field goals in five attempts, and 28 extra point kicks in 29 attempts.

In 1961, Conrad became the starting flanker (right halfback); paired with Sonny Randle as the team's starting wide receivers. In his first start, Conrad had five receptions for 57 yards against the Cleveland Browns. In an early December game, he had four receptions for 128 yards and two receiving touchdowns of 32 and 43 yards. His first touchdown reception that day was thrown by John David Crow. On the season, Conrad registered 30 receptions for 499 yards and two touchdowns. He also had 22 yards in 20 rushing attempts. Over the next eight seasons of his career, Conrad had only one more rushing attempt.

Conrad returned five punts for 103 yards in 1961, and had only one kickoff return that season. In a mid-October game against the Philadelphia Eagles, Conrad had the only Cardinals' touchdown, on a 73-yard punt return. Conrad missed his only field goal attempt of the season; and kicked four extra points. He had only one more field attempt and no extra point attempts over the remainder of his career.

In 1962, Conrad started all 14 games at flanker. He collected 62 receptions (third in the NFL) for 954 yards (ninth in the NFL) and four touchdowns. He had four games with over 100 receiving yards. In December 1962, he had six receptions for 128 yards and two touchdowns against the Dallas Cowboys, including a 72-yard touchdown reception. On that play, Cardinals' quarterback Charley Johnson completed a pass to Sonny Randle who lateralled the ball to Conrad, who then ran the final 20 yards for a touchdown. He returned two punts and no kickoffs that season.

In 1963, Conrad led the NFL with 73 receptions and was named first-team All-Pro by the Associated Press (AP) and United Press International (UPI), and second-team All-Pro by the Newspaper Enterprise Association (NEA). He also had 967 receiving yards (sixth in the NFL) and 10 touchdowns (tied for sixth). In a December 8 game against the Philadelphia Eagles, he had six receptions for 122 yards and two touchdowns. He returned only one punt that season.

In 1964, Conrad posted 61 receptions (fourth in the NFL) for 780 yards and six touchdowns, receiving Pro Bowl honors. The UPI named him second-team All Pro. He led the Cardinals in receptions, receiving yards, and touchdown receptions. He had one kickoff return that season, the last kick return of his career. In 1965, Conrad had 58 receptions (tied for sixth in the NFL) for 909 yards (fifth in the NFL) and five touchdowns. He again led the Cardinals in receptions and receiving yards. However, the Cardinals suffered a number of injuries to key players, including quarterback Charley Johnson and had a 5–9 record.

In 1966, Charley Winner replaced Wally Lemm as the Cardinals' head coach, and brought in a new offensive system; among other things, hoping to improve the team's rushing offense. Conrad later observed Winner's offense also involved throwing more to the tight end. In 1966, Conrad had 34 receptions for 388 yards, while future Hall of Fame tight end Jackie Smith led the Cardinals with 45 receptions for 810 yards. The team had an 8–5–1 record. In 1967, Conrad had 47 receptions for 637 yards, second on the team to Smith in both categories. In 1968, Conrad had 32 receptions for 449 yards (third best on the Cardinals) and four touchdowns; Smith again leading the team in receptions and receiving yards. The Cardinals were 9–4–1 that season, with Jim Hart at quarterback.

Before the 1969 season, it was reported that Conrad considered retirement unless he could be traded to the Dallas Cowboys, because he needed to be near his business interests in Texas, where he had a feed store; and that he also wanted to be closer to his wife and children who lived in Clifton, Texas. Conrad later said that the Cardinals' emphasis on the tight end over wide receivers in their offensive scheme was also a factor in his considering retirement. After Conrad told the Cardinals he would not be coming back to the team the next season; the Cardinals worked out a trade with the Cowboys. On June 26, 1969, Conrad was traded to the Cowboys in exchange for a fifth-round draft choice (No. 127-Barry Pierson).

At the final team meeting before leaving the Cardinals, placekicker Jim Bakken, who had been Conrad's teammate since 1962, presented Conrad with a duck decoy signed by all of his teammates reading "'To Bobby Joe Conrad, Decoy of the Year, 1968'". This was the only memento of his football career that Conrad would later keep in his business office.

In 11 seasons with the Cardinals, Conrad did not miss a game (playing in 148 games). He ended his Cardinals' career with 132 starts; 418 receptions for 5,828 yards and 38 touchdowns; 441 yards in 118 rushing attempts with two touchdowns; 14 field goals and 95 extra points made; four interceptions; 51 punt returns for 462 yards (9.1 yards per return) and two touchdowns, and 33 kickoff returns for 813 yards (24.6 yards per return); and 7,633 all-purpose yards.

=== Dallas Cowboys ===
The Cowboys brought Conrad to the team to back up wide receivers Lance Rentzel and Bob Hayes. They waived Conrad in early September 1969, but no other team claimed him. On September 20, 1969, the Cowboys put the injured Hayes on the "move list" and activated Conrad. Conrad played in eight games for the Cowboys, recording four receptions for 74 yards. Conrad retired after the 1969 season.

== Legacy and honors ==
In 1976, Conrad was inducted into the Texas A&M Athletic Hall of Fame. In 2002, he was inducted into the Texas Sports Hall of Fame. In 2006, he was inducted into the Texas High School Football Hall of Fame.

When Conrad retired, he was the seventh all-time pass receiver in the NFL with 422 receptions (418 with the Cardinals) and had a string of 148 consecutive games played with the Cardinals. He was the Cardinals all-time leading receiver at the time he was traded. Conrad is eighth all-time in Cardinals' history in receiving yards, ninth in receptions, seventh in touchdown receptions, 11th in yards from scrimmage, and tied for 12th in total touchdowns (as of 2026). Overall, he played in 156 games during his career, and never missed a game because of injury.

Conrad was known for having good hands as a receiver. He attributed his ability to catch passes to concentration and his having big hands and long fingers. While with the Cardinals, he had a streak of 94 consecutive games with a pass reception. At the time that streak ended, it was believed to be one game short of Don Hutson's then-NFL record 95 consecutive games with a reception. It subsequently was discovered that Hutson's record was counted erroneously, and that he had streaks of 44 games and 50 games. Therefore, Conrad's 94-game consecutive reception streak from 1961 to 1968 had set the record for most consecutive games with a reception at that time; breaking the actual record of 93 consecutive games with a reception held by Tommy McDonald (accumulated from 1957 to 1964). Conrad's record was exceeded by Lance Alworth of the American Football League in 1969.

== NFL career statistics ==
Legend
	Led the league
**Bold**	Career high

Year	Team	Games		Receiving				
Year	Team	GP	GS	Rec	Yds	Avg	Lng	TD
1959	CRD	12	12	14	142	10.1	25	3
1960	STL	12	4	7	103	14.7	24	0
1961	STL	14	13	30	499	16.6	50	2
1962	STL	14	14	62	954	15.4	72	4
1963	STL	14	14	**73**	**967**	13.2	48	**10**
1964	STL	14	14	61	780	12.8	53	6
1965	STL	14	14	58	909	15.7	71	5
1966	STL	14	14	34	388	11.4	40	2
1967	STL	14	14	47	637	13.6	53	2
1968	STL	14	14	32	449	14.0	**80**	4
1969	DAL	8	0	4	74	**18.5**	34	0
Career		156	135	422	5,902	14.0	80	38

== Personal life ==
Conrad made his home in Clifton, Texas throughout his life; only leaving during the football season. He married his high school sweetheart Betty, with whom he has two children. He worked for the Federal Land Bank, Farmers Home Administration and/or the Texas Land Bank while living in Clifton. He was also a judge in Bosque County for eight years. In 1972, he was made vice president and general manager of the Clifton Chamber of Commerce.
