= Public duties =

Obligations of a public official to the people they represent

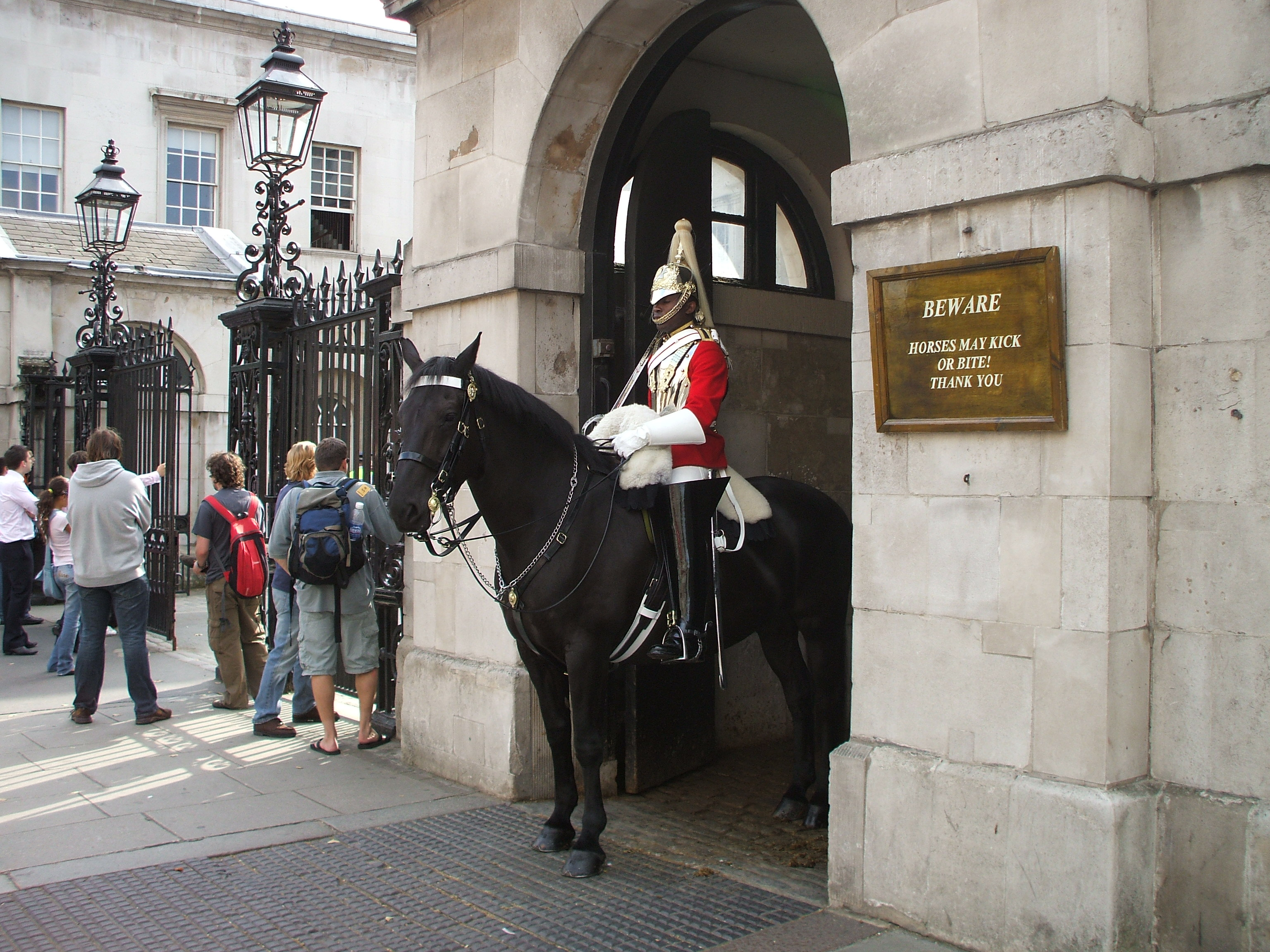
A member of the Household Cavalry standing watch in London

Public duties are performed by military personnel, and usually have a ceremonial or historic significance rather than an overtly operational role.

== Armenia ==
Since September 2018, the Honour Guard Battalion of the Ministry of Defense of Armenia has been responsible for performing public duties at the President's Residence in Yerevan, the national capital. A pair of ceremonial guards are posted at two sentry boxes in the front of the residence and are relieved in a brief guard mounting ceremony and an exhibition drill. Guards are posted every weekend in the afternoon and evening hours and on national holidays.

== Canada ==
The service branches of the Canadian Armed Forces typically maintains one or more public duties detachments and units. Public duties have been performed throughout the country, with public duties having been performed at various provincial capitals, typically at the legislature, or the official residences of the lieutenant governors. However, public duties in Ottawa and Quebec City are the only regularly scheduled performances in the country.

=== Ottawa ===
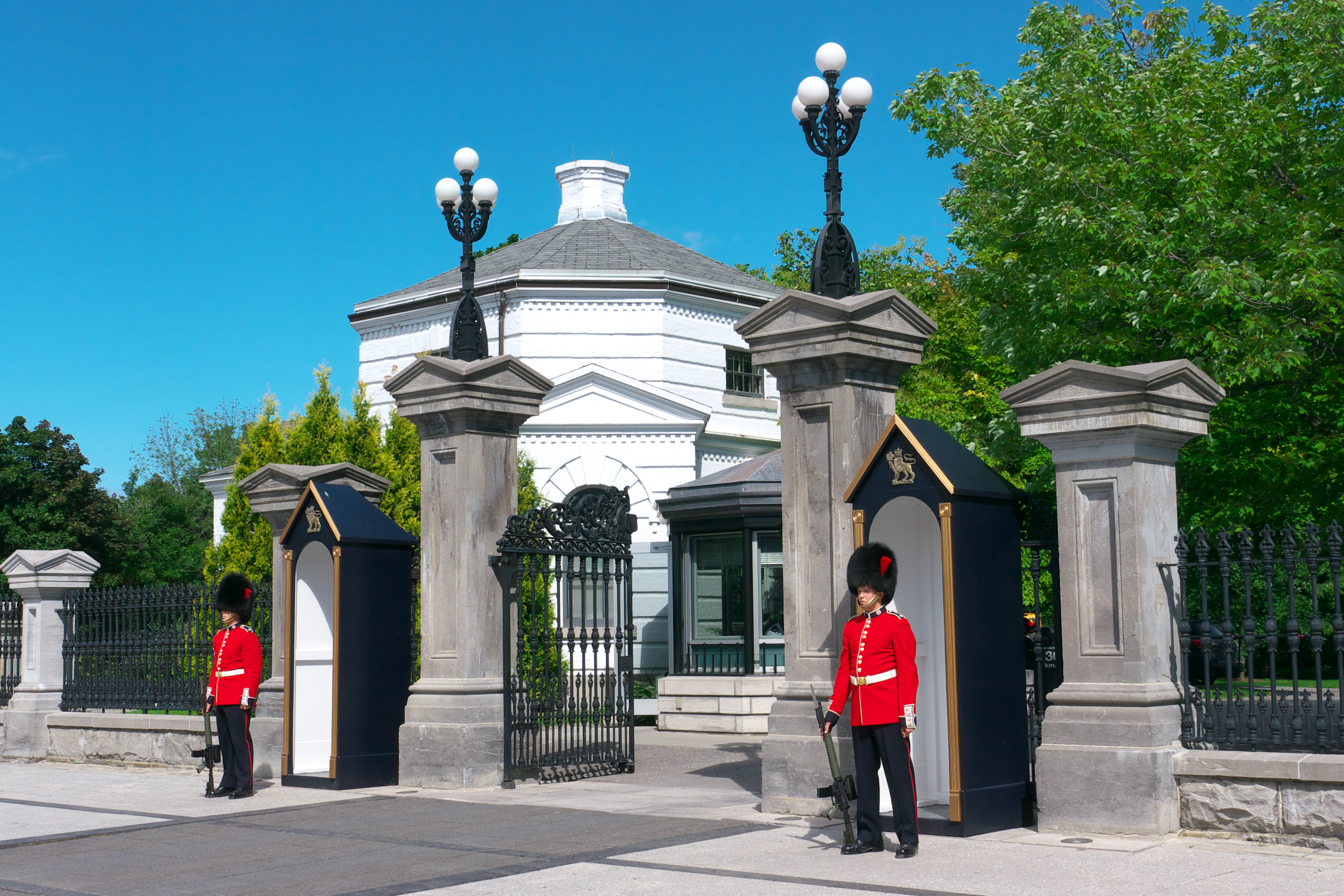
Two Governor General's Foot Guardsmen standing watch at Rideau Hall, an official residence for the Monarch, and the Governor General.

Public duties in Ottawa is formally the responsibility of two regiments of foot guards, the Canadian Grenadier Guards, and the Governor General's Foot Guards; with one of their main tasks being the provision of sentries for public duties in support of the Government of Canada in Ottawa. The two regiments of foot guards, along with the Governor General's Horse Guards, based in Toronto, make up Canada's Household Division. Public duties in which these regiments take part in includes mounting the guard at Parliament Hill; and Rideau Hall, the official residence for the Monarch, and the Governor General of Canada. The two units are also tasked with mounting the guard of honour for visiting dignitaries. Public duties were also performed by the Canadian Guards until 1970, when the unit was reduced to nil-strength, and moved to the Supplementary Order of Battle.

The Canadian Army also operates a summer public duties detachment known as the Ceremonial Guard, which assumes public duties in Ottawa from late-June to late-August. The Ceremonial Guard is made up of regulars or reservists of the Canadian Army, Royal Canadian Air Force, and the Royal Canadian Navy. Public duties undertaken by the Ceremonial Guard includes sentry duties at the National War Memorial, Rideau Hall, as well as performing the Changing of the Guard ceremony in Parliament Hill, and the Fortissimo Sunset Ceremony. Members of the Ceremonial Guard wear the uniforms of the Canadian foot guards, as they have historically staffed the summer public duties detachment, before membership in the Ceremonial Guard was opened to the entire Canadian Armed Forces. The Ceremonial Guard are considered an ad hoc detachment, as its members are drawn from various units of the armed forces, and does not constitute a permanent unit in the Canadian Forces' order of battle.

The Canadian Armed Forces also maintains a National Sentry Program, where its members perform sentry duties at the National War Memorial from early-April to 10 November, the day before Remembrance Day. The program formally falls under the command structure of the Ceremonial Guard, although its volunteers are permitted to wear the ceremonial dress uniforms of their respective units/service while performing public duties at the war memorial.

=== Quebec City ===
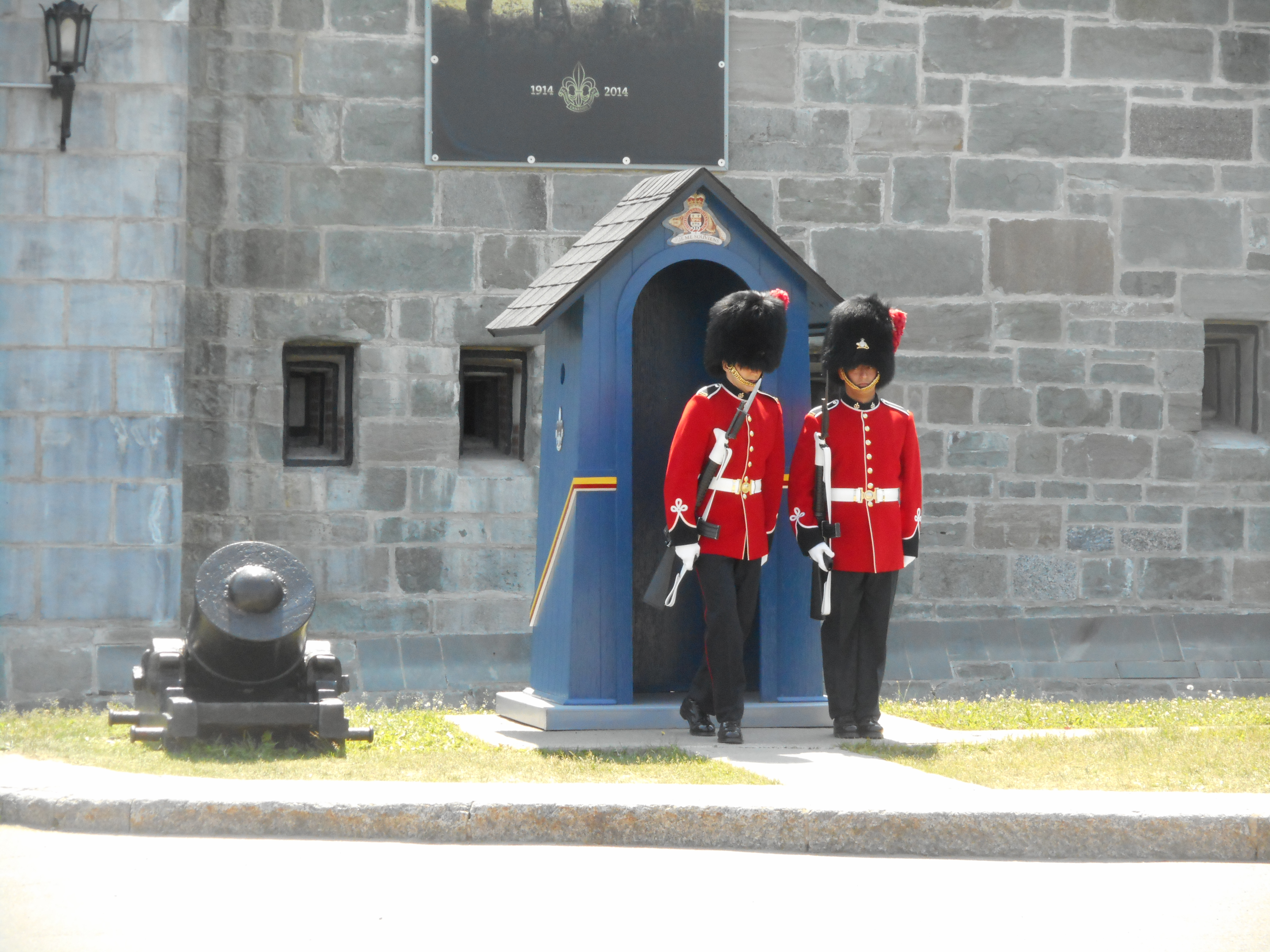
Sentries during the changing of the guard at the Citadelle of Quebec.

Public duties at the Citadelle of Quebec, a military installation in Quebec City, are carried out by the Royal 22nd Regiment. The regiment carries out public duties at the Citadelle of Quebec from late-June to Labour Day, which falls on the first Monday of September.

The military installation serves as the home garrison for the regiment, as well as the secondary official residence for the Monarch, and Governor General of Canada. The regiment has carried out public duties at the Citadelle since 1928, excluding a brief hiatus from 1939 to 1945, due to the Second World War.

== Denmark ==
There are two regiments in Denmark, who provide soldiers for public duties, the Royal Life Guard regiment and Guard Hussar Regiment. The Guard Hussar Regiment Mounted Squadron provide mounted escorts for the Royal family and foreign dignitaries, and carry ceremonial services for the Royal Danish Army.

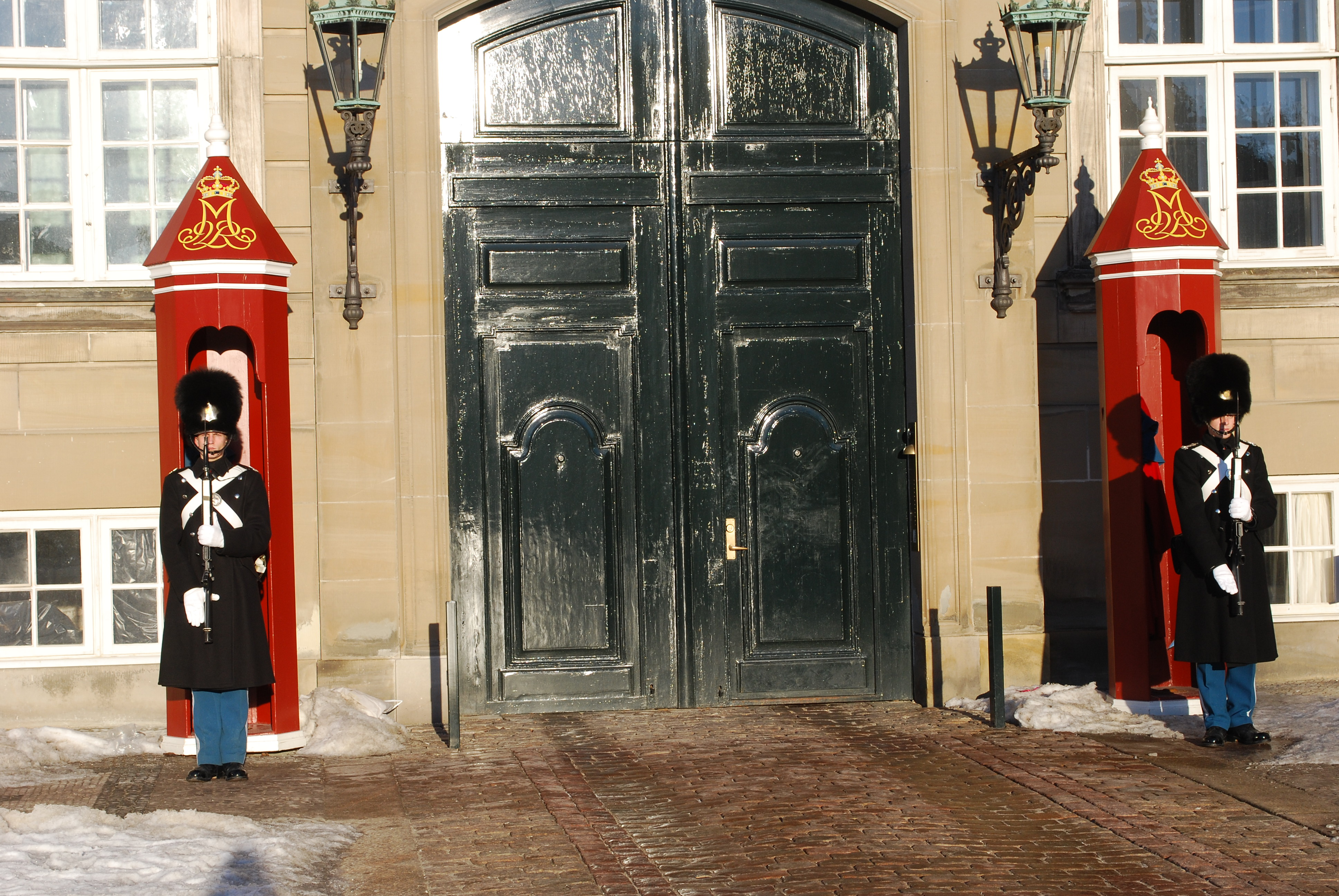
The Danish Royal Life Guard provide permanent guards to Amalienborg Palace.

The Royal Life Guards provide a permanent guard at the Amalienborg Palace, Kastellet (part of the old fortification of Copenhagen), Rosenborg Castle/garrison of the Royal Life Guards in Copenhagen and the garrison of Høvelte. On occasions guard is kept at Fredensborg Palace, Marselisborg Palace, Gråsten Palace, Christiansborg Palace and other locations inside the Danish realm.

== Germany ==
The Wachregiment Berlin was founded in early 1921. In addition to genuine security duties, the unit was used for ceremonial public duties in the capital. The regiment was disbanded in June 1921 and shortly after was revived as Kommando der Wachtruppe (lit. Headquarters Guard Troop).

The Wachtruppe comprised seven companies, each drawn from one of the seven active army divisions. Each company served for three months before returning to its parent division. In this way, the Wachtruppe represented the whole Reichswehr.

The Kommando was based at Moabit Barracks, and every Monday, Wednesday, Friday and Saturday, performed a modest changing of the guard ceremony for the public. On each Sunday, Tuesday and Thursday, the entire Wachtruppe, accompanied by the regimental band, marched from the barracks through the Brandenburg Gate and to the Berlin War Memorial, providing a greater spectacle for public view.

In 1934, the unit was renamed Wachtruppe Berlin and in 1936, a headquarters and administration company were added. In June 1937, the unit was again renamed Wach Regiment Berlin. Postings were now done by individuals, not entire companies, and each man served six-month tours of duty. The unit provided escorts and Guards of Honour for State Visits, Conferences and even the Olympic Games.

In 1939, the unit was reorganized as the Infantry Regiment Großdeutschland. While equipped as a field unit, the regiment also maintained a public duties detachment in the capital. The ceremonial guard was pressed into service during the July bomb plot in 1944 and helped round up conspirators in the capital.

In 1957, the post-war Bundeswehr established the Wachbataillon, a tri-service unit, for ceremonial duties.

== United Kingdom ==
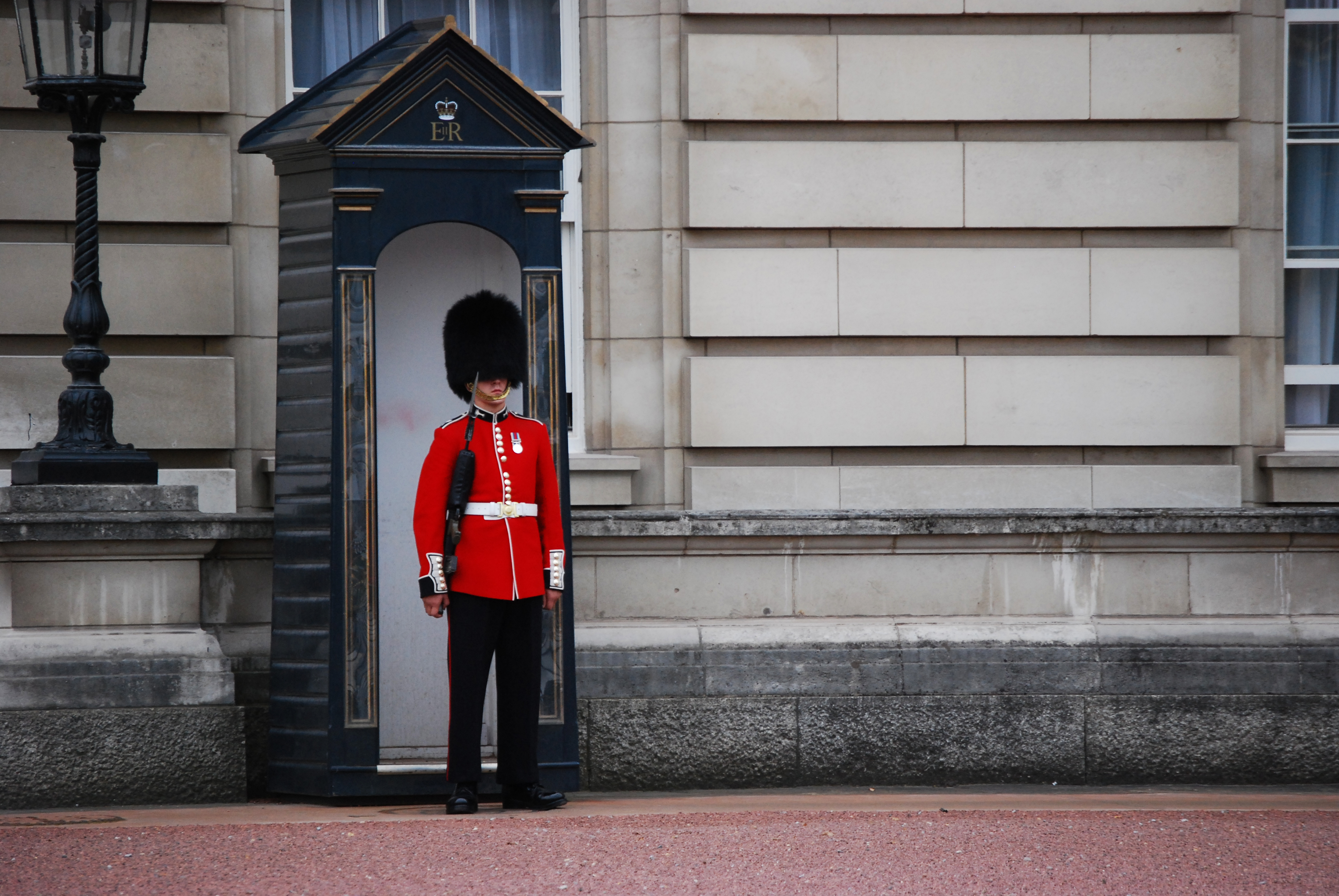
A sentry from the Welsh Guards at the Buckingham Palace, one of several locations watched by the King's Guard.

The Household Cavalry Mounted Regiment, King's Troop Royal Horse Artillery three infantry battalions, incremental companies of the Foot Guards and Balaklava Company, 5 SCOTS (Argyll and Sutherland Highlanders) of the British Army are currently tasked with the provision of Public Duties. Two of these are from the Foot Guards of the Household Division, and two are an infantry battalion. The former are normally based at Wellington Barracks in central London, within a short distance of Buckingham Palace, and at Victoria Barracks in Windsor Castle, while the latter is at the Cavalry Barracks, Hounslow.

Apart from providing the King's Guard at Buckingham Palace and St James's Palace, and the Tower of London Guard, the Public Duties battalions also provide the Windsor Castle Guard, which is otherwise provided by the battalion based at Windsor. From 1783 to 1973, the Guards provided a nightly detachment called the Bank Picquet for guard duty at the Bank of England.

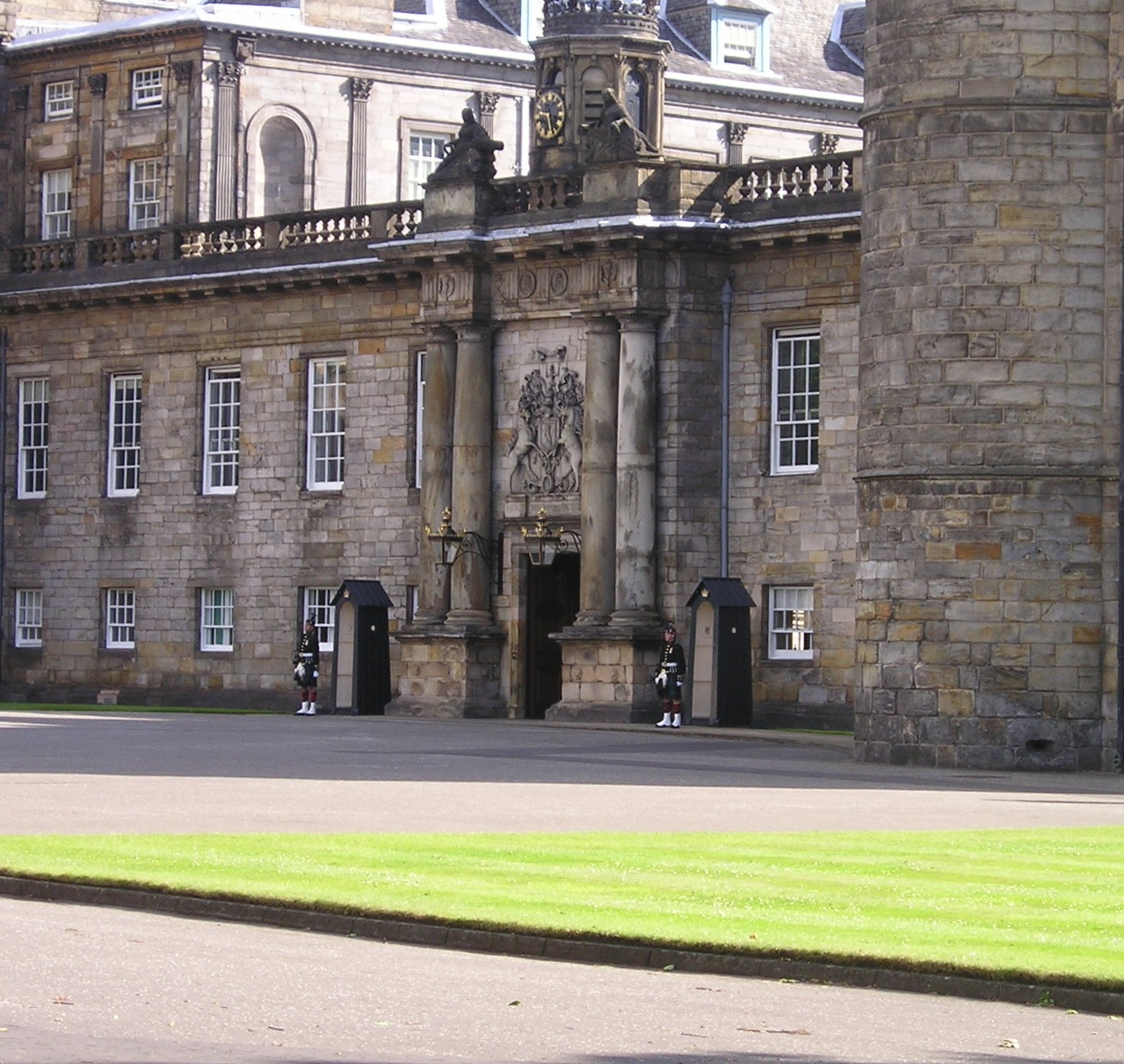
Sentry duties are taken up in Holyrood Palace when the monarch is in Scotland.

Public duties are also carried out in Edinburgh, although not as frequently as in London. Prior to 2002, sentries were permanently stationed at the entrance to Edinburgh Castle, but these were withdrawn due to cost-cutting measures. Today, sentries are posted during the evenings between 6 pm and 9 am, and throughout the week that the monarch spends in Edinburgh at both the castle and the Palace of Holyroodhouse. Sentries are also posted at the castle during the month of the Edinburgh Military Tattoo prior to each performance, with the regiment forming a guard of honour at the end of each performance.

Public duties are performed by the Balaklava Company of the Royal Regiment of Scotland a single incremental company based permanently in Scotland for public duties.

== United States ==
=== Washington, D.C. ===
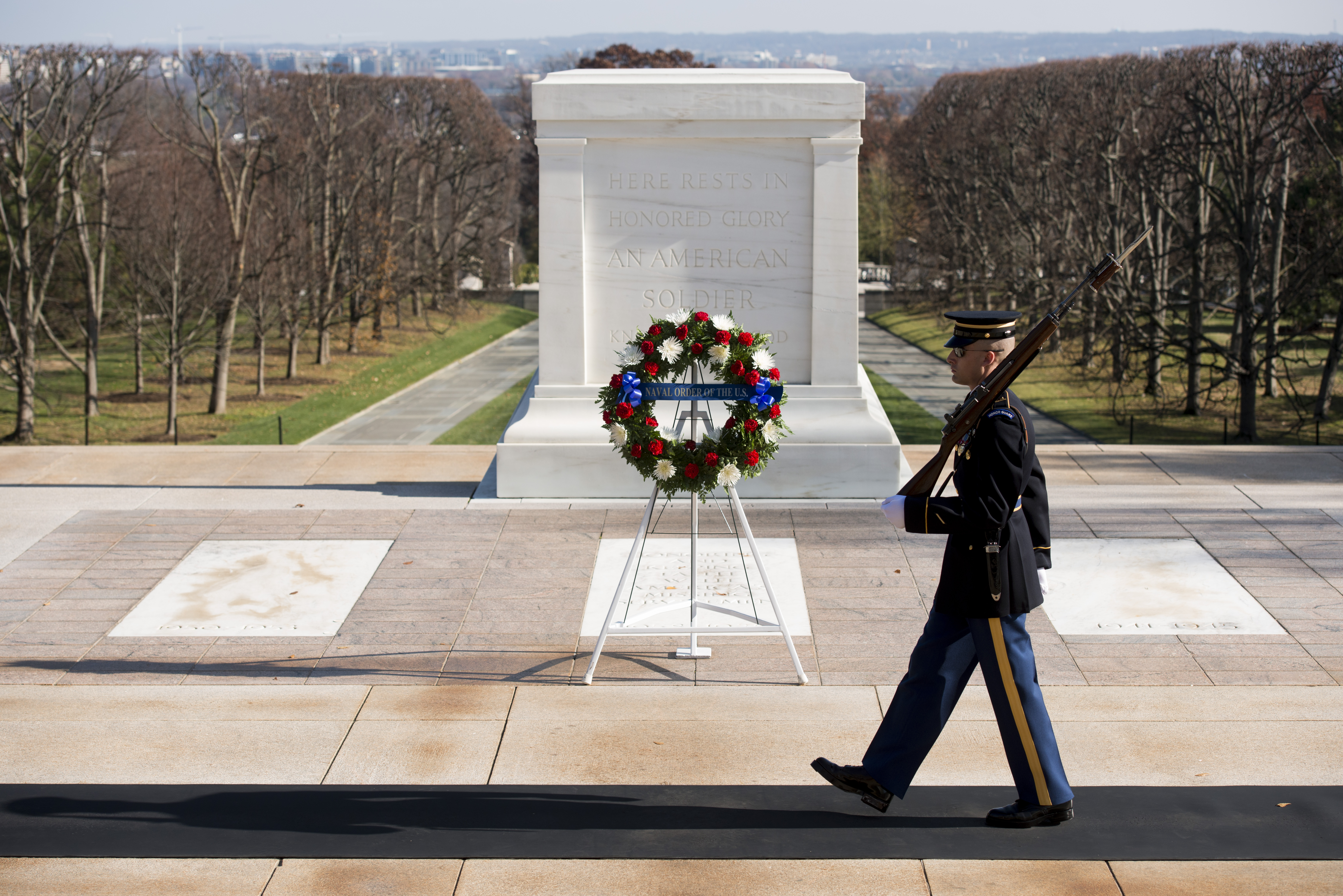
The 3rd U.S. Infantry Regiment provides the sentry for the Tomb of the Unknown Soldier, and other ceremonies in Washington, D.C.

The 3rd U.S. Infantry Regiment is an official ceremonial unit of the United States Army, and has provided the escort for the President of the United States, as well as formally provides security for Washington, D.C. Public duties performed by the regiment includes ceremonies at the White House, the Pentagon, and other national ceremonies throughout the capital and its neighbouring areas. The guard also provide military escorts for military funerals at Arlington National Cemetery, and a perpetual sentry at the Tomb of the Unknown Soldier since 1948. Other service branches of the United States Armed Forces also maintain their own units for public duties in Washington.

=== Other states ===
The United States Army installation, Fort Huachuca, maintains a ceremonial cavalry troop known as B Troop, 4th Cavalry Regiment. It is one of only four remaining in the Army, and participates in mounted ceremonies, parades, and public relations. B Troop, 4th Cavalry Regiment resides at the main post stables and conducts events around the southwestern United States. Troopers are volunteers who are employed at or stationed at Fort Huachuca for their regular duties. Prior to being issued their horse, carbine, and saber, each recruit must undergo a three-to-four month riding school. Once proficient in mounted drill, the recruit must demonstrate a proficiency in saber, and carbine/pistol accuracy. Only then does the recruit become a Trooper and is issued a horse. B Troop was specifically chosen as it was the Troop that captured Geronimo in 1886.

A number of other military units from the United States National Guard, and state militias also maintain units which undertake public duties. The Governor's Guards of Connecticut is another unit which engages in public duties for the state, primarily in the capital of Hartford. Composed of two foot guard units and two horse guard units, the company-sized unit is a part of the Connecticut State Guard, which is a branch of the Connecticut State Militia. Public duties undertaken by the Governor's Guard include presidential, and gubernatorial inaugurations, as well as supporting memorial dedications, local parades, and celebrations for Memorial Day and Veterans Day.

The Royal Guards of Hawaii is a ceremonial reenactment unit made up of members of the Air National Guard, formed in 1963. Public duties performed by the Royal Guards of Hawaii include official state functions involving the Governor of Hawaii, and other public functions for descendants of the House of Kawānanakoa, the descendants of the Hawaiian royal family. The uniforms used by the guards are similar to the uniforms used by the royal bodyguards of the former Kingdom of Hawaii.

The Ross Volunteer Company serves as the guard of honour for the Governor of Texas. Formed in 1897, the unit is composed of junior and senior cadets of the Texas A&M University Corps of Cadets. The unit performs in ceremonial activities from its base at College Station, Texas, and its area of responsibility in Austin.
