= Pat Olsen =

American engineer, entrepreneur, and philanthropist (1902–2000)

Carl Edwin "Pat" Olsen
- Born: August 3, 1902; Clifton, Texas
- Died: May 11, 2000 (aged 97); Kingwood, Texas
- Education: Texas A&M University
- Occupations: Engineer; Philanthropist
- Known for: Olsen Field at Blue Bell Park

Carl Edwin "Pat" Olsen (August 3, 1902 – May 11, 2000) was an American engineer, entrepreneur and philanthropist. He played college baseball at Texas A&M University and was briefly with the New York Yankees organization. He founded a manufacturing and oil exploration company after leaving baseball. Olsen financially supported Texas A&M, his hometown of Clifton, Texas and Major League Baseball. He is the namesake for the baseball field at Texas A&M.

Olsen was named a Distinguished Alumnus of Texas A&M and was inducted into the Texas Baseball Hall of Fame, the Texas A&M Athletic Hall of Fame and the Texas High School Baseball Coaches Association Hall of Fame. After Olsen died, a legal battle ensued between his family and Texas A&M over the rights to his multimillion dollar estate.

== Biography ==
C. E. "Pat" Olsen was born to Norwegian immigrants in Clifton, Texas on August 3, 1902. He had nine siblings; an older brother attended Texas A&M and was a baseball letterman between 1914 and 1916. Olsen was a member of the Ross Volunteers and lettered as a baseball pitcher between 1921 and 1923. Upon his graduation in 1923, Olsen entered professional baseball. He was signed to the New York Yankees organization and was a spring training roommate of Lou Gehrig, but he never made the Yankees major league roster. In October 1923, he married Elsie Duncan, the daughter of the Texas A&M food services director.

Olsen founded Gearench Manufacturing Company in Houston in 1927. The company's earliest product, the Gearench, was a tool for working with small-diameter pipe. Olsen sold the company, which included facilities in Houston and Clifton, in 1978. Pat Olsen donated the first Gearench building in Clifton, the former Clifton Lutheran College, to house the Bosque County Conservatory of Fine Arts (now called the Bosque Arts Center).

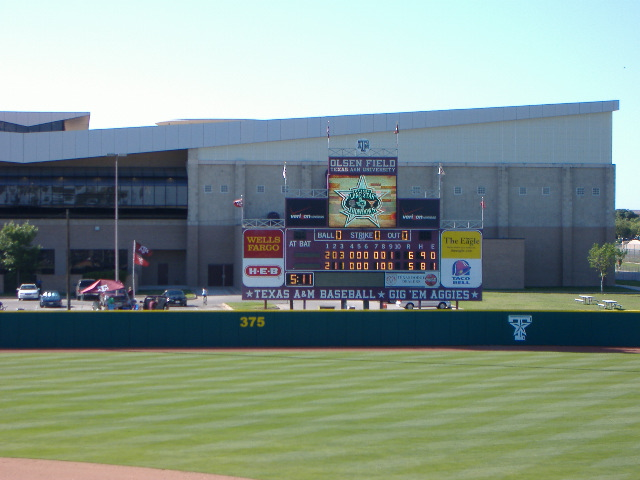
Scoreboard at Olsen Field (2006)

Olsen remained attached to baseball throughout his life and made significant financial contributions to various aspects of the game. In 1978, Olsen Field was dedicated as Texas A&M's baseball field. He was also a member of the New York Yankees Alumni Club and he donated to the Major League Baseball pension plan. By the 1980s, Olsen had attended more than fifty All-Star Games and more than half of the World Series in baseball history. He was asked to throw out the ceremonial first pitch in game one of the 1984 World Series; former Texas A&M pitcher Mark Thurmond was one of the starting pitchers in the game. In 1991, during game 7 of the world series, Atlanta Braves vs Minnesota Twins, Tim McCarver mentioned that this was his 283 consecutive world series game that he had attended.

Olsen is a member of the Texas Baseball Hall of Fame and the Texas A&M Athletic Hall of Fame. He was named a Texas A&M Distinguished Alumnus in 1981. In 1991, he was a member of the second class inducted into the Texas High School Baseball Coaches Association Hall of Fame. Texas A&M awards the C. E. "Pat" Olsen Outstanding Pitcher Award.

Pat Olsen died in Kingwood, Texas on May 11, 2000. In 2002, Olsen's family sued the Texas A&M Foundation in a dispute over the rights to Olsen's estate. The family said that a 1987 will would have left the $1.1 million estate to Olsen's son, but that he had been coerced to amend the will in 1994 and to leave his estate to the university. His son said that the elderly Olsen was mentally incapacitated by 1994. The university said that Olsen and his son were estranged and that Olsen grew more dependent on his friends at the university in his last years. A Harris County probate court ruled in favor of the family in 2002.

In 2010, Blue Bell Creameries pledged $7 million to renovate Olsen Field and to rename it Olsen Field at Blue Bell Park. In May 2013, family members criticized the removal of lettering with Olsen's name that had long been located at the entrance to the field.
