= Dallas Nine =

Artist group from Dallas, Texas active from 1928 to 1945

The Dallas Nine was a group of Dallas, Texas artists active between 1928 and 1945.

== Members ==
The group's core consisted of nine men who had applied to decorate the Hall of State in 1936: Jerry Bywaters, Thomas M. Stell, Jr., Harry P. Carnohan, Otis M. Dozier, Alexandre Hogue, William Lester, Everett Spruce, John Douglass and Perry Nichols. Other members in the 1930s and 1940s included Charles T. Bowling, Russell Vernon Hunter, Merritt T. Mauzey, Florence McClung, Allie Tennant, Dorothy Austin, Don Brown, and Lloyd Goff. The group's range of practices included painting, printmaking and sculpture. Works by many of these artists are held at the Bywaters Special Collections at Southern Methodist University.

== Exhibitions ==
Nine of the group's members exhibited in 1932 at the Dallas Public Art Museum, in a show titled “Nine Young Dallas Artists. They exhibited at the 1936 Texas Centennial Exposition, the 1939 Golden Gate Exposition in San Francisco and in the 1939 New York World's Fair. A special issue of Art Digest featured their work. In 1985 the Dallas Museum of Art presented the exhibition Lone Star Regionalism: The Dallas Nine and Their Circle, 1928-1945.
