= Olsen Field at Blue Bell Park =

Baseball park at Texas A&M University

Coordinates: 30.60575°N 96.34130°W

- "Home of Olsen Magic"
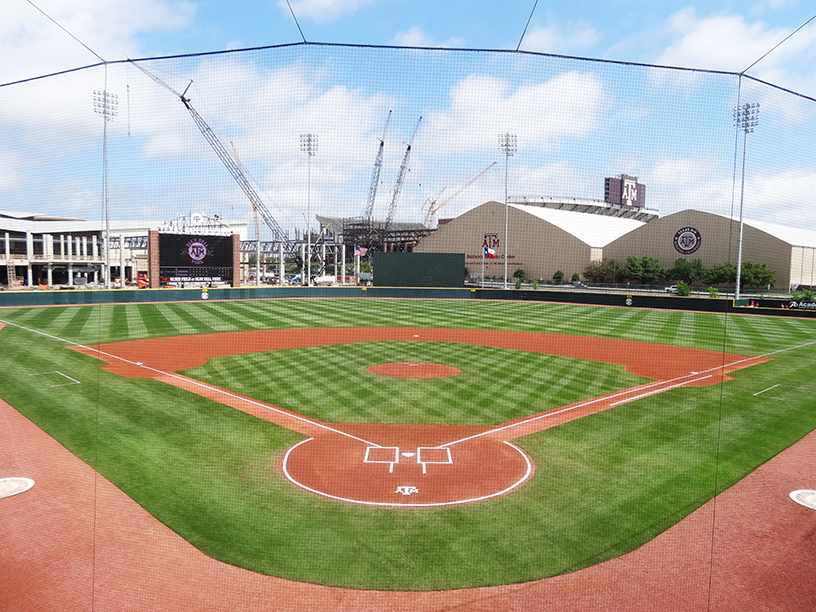
- Interactive map of Olsen Field at Blue Bell Park
- Former names: Olsen Field
- Location: 301 Olsen Boulevard; College Station, Texas 77843
- Owner: Texas A&M University
- Operator: Texas A&M University
- Capacity: 6,100
- Surface: Tifway 419 Bermuda Grass (Outfield); Latitude 36 Bermuda Grass (Infield)
- Record attendance: 8,075 (April 13, 2024 vs Vanderbilt)
- Field size: 330 ft (LF/RF), 375 ft (LC/RC), 400 ft (CF)

Construction
- Groundbreaking: 1977
- Opened: March 21, 1978
- Renovated: February 2012

Tenant
- Texas A&M Aggies baseball (NCAA) (1978–Present)

Olsen Field at Blue Bell Park is a baseball stadium in College Station, Texas, that is home to the Texas A&M baseball program. The stadium was dedicated on March 21, 1978, and is named in honor of C. E. "Pat" Olsen, a 1923 graduate of Texas A&M University and a former baseball player in the New York Yankees minor league system. Olsen Field has served as an NCAA regional site five times and had its 1999 regional attendance ranked second with 53,287. The first NCAA Regional Tournament held at Olsen Field was in 1989. In 2004, Sports Illustrated on Campus ranked Olsen Field "the best college baseball venue."

Olsen Field underwent a major renovation that began on June 7, 2011, funded in part by donations from the owners of Blue Bell Creameries, based in nearby Brenham. In return, Blue Bell gained naming rights. Some new features of the stadium included an expanded concourse and concessions area, luxury suites, a new press box, club seating, two grass berms, expanded locker rooms and coaches offices, a student athletic center, and extended seating closer to the field. However, the seating capacity was decreased from 7,000 to 5,400 to accommodate the changes (although with standing room only will still hold over 7,000). Olsen Field reopened on February 17, 2012, for the first game of the 2012 baseball season even though some projects were not completely finished; the remaining work was completed on non-game days.

In 2015, the Aggies ranked 7th among Division I baseball programs in attendance, averaging 4,857 per home game. On April 13, 2024, a new post-renovation attendance record was set, with 8,075 watching the Texas A&M Aggies defeat the Vanderbilt Commodores by a score of 9-0.

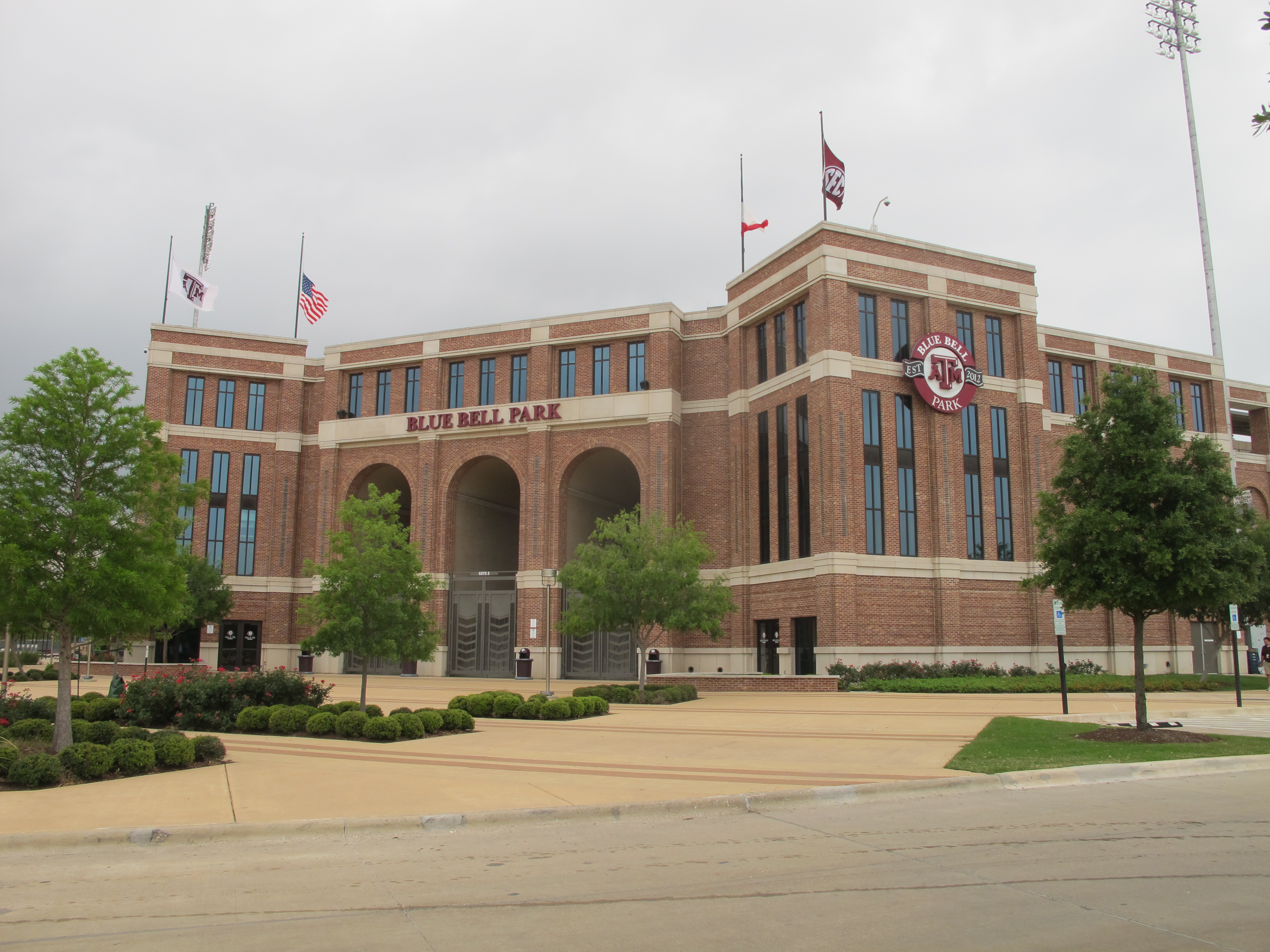
Blue Bell Park, Front Facade

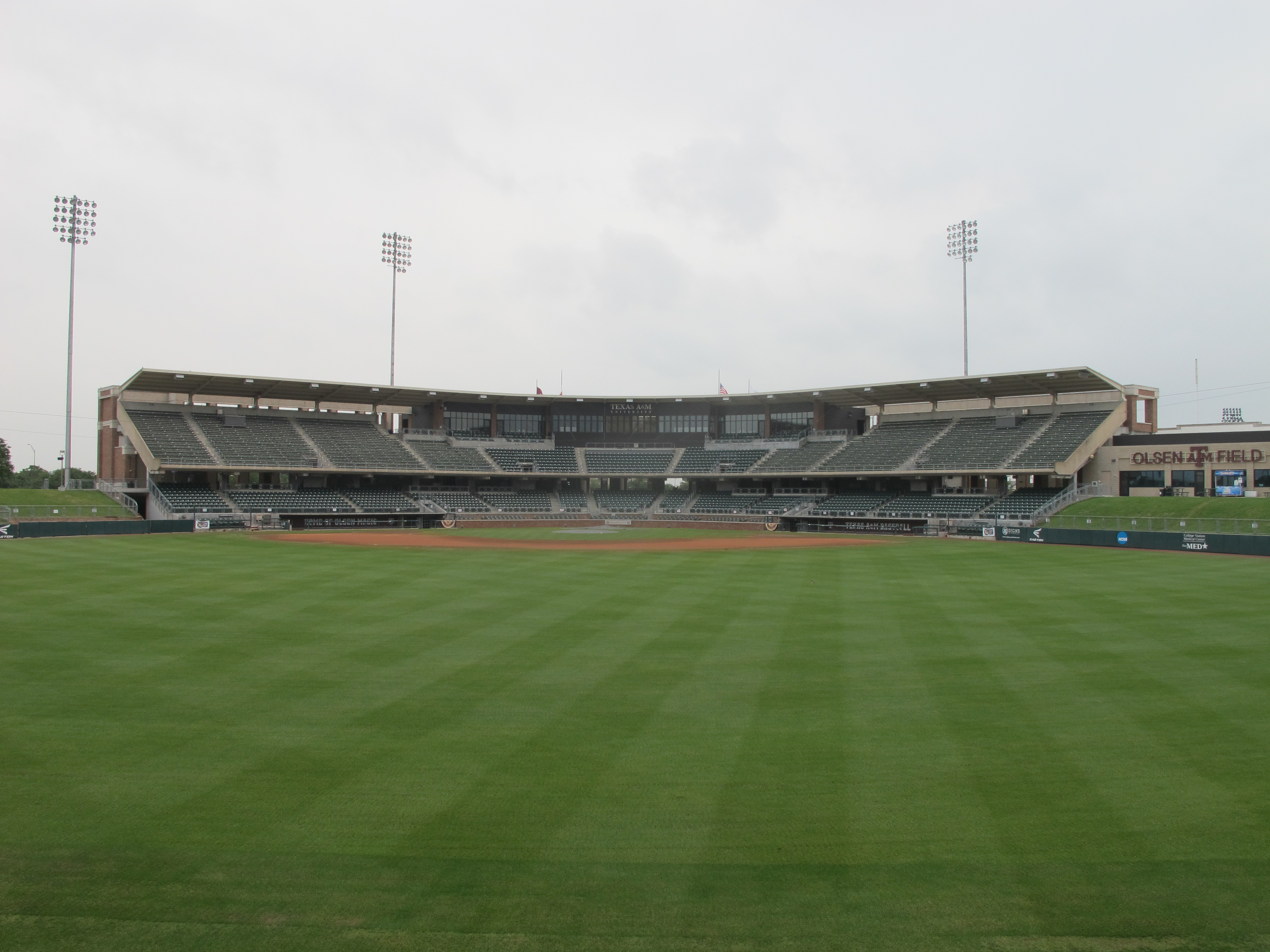
Blue Bell Park, Stands

== See also ==
- List of NCAA Division I baseball venues
