= Clifton, Texas =

City in Bosque County, Texas, United States

- City
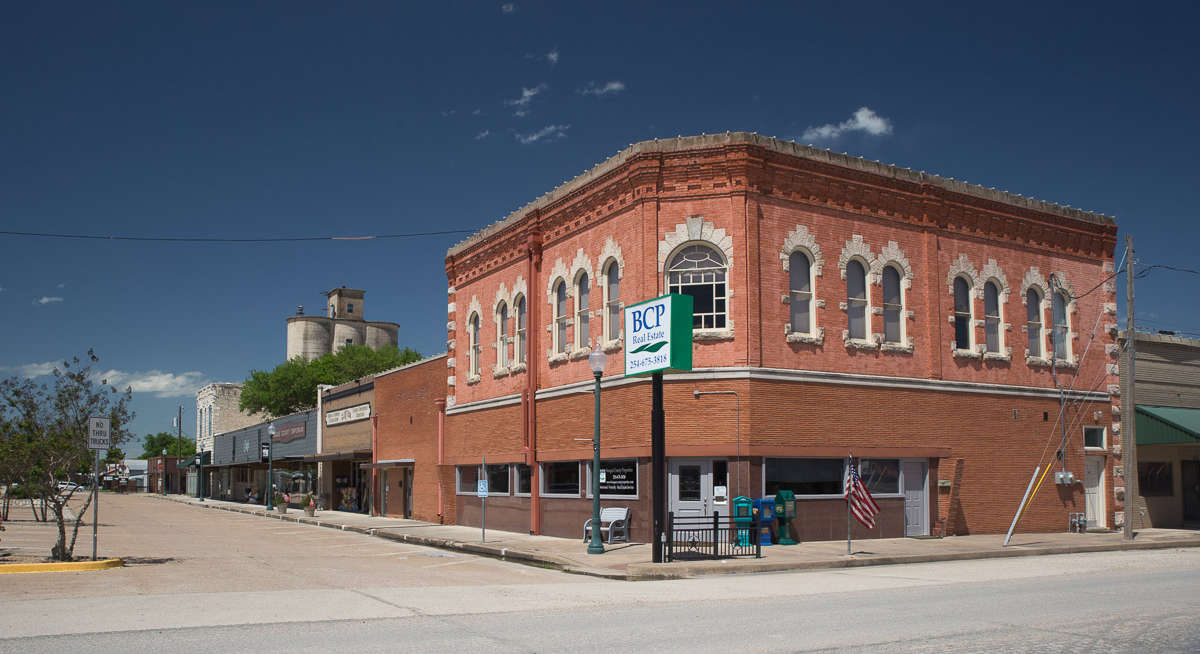
- Downtown Clifton
- Nickname: Norwegian Capital of Texas
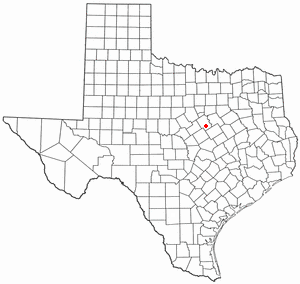
- Location of Clifton, Texas

- Coordinates: 31°46′56″N 97°34′57″W
- Country: United States
- State: Texas
- County: Bosque

Area
  - Total: 2.06 sq mi (5.34 km^{2})
  - Land: 2.05 sq mi (5.31 km^{2})
  - Water: 0.012 sq mi (0.03 km^{2})
- Elevation: 682 ft (208 m)

Population (2020)
  - Total: 3,465
  - Density: 1,690/sq mi (653/km^{2})
- Time zone: UTC-6 (Central (CST))
  - Summer (DST): UTC-5 (CDT)
- ZIP codes: 76634, 76644
- Area code: 254
- FIPS code: 48-15472
- GNIS feature ID: 2409484
- Website: www.cityofclifton.org

Clifton is the largest city in Bosque County, Texas, United States. The city's population was 3,465 at the 2020 census. Clifton and the surrounding area were settled by Norwegian settlers in the mid 1800s. Today, this area is in the National Register of Historic Places as the Norse Historic District.

== History ==
Clifton was founded in the winter of 1852–1853, when the families of Frank Kell, Joseph A. Kemp, Samuel and Monroe Locker, and T. A. McSpadden settled in the vicinity. The town was named Cliff Town after the surrounding limestone cliffs. Over the years, the name was altered to Clifton. The site was originally on the banks of Clear Branch. The Masonic Lodge hall and a log schoolhouse were the first public buildings. The post office was established in 1859. The First Presbyterian Church of Clifton was organized in 1861 and is the county's oldest church in continuous service. The Baptists built the first church building in Clifton in 1884–1885. After the Civil War, Joel Martin Stinnett, the grandfather of Joseph Kemp, built a flour mill powered by the Bosque River. In 1868, this mill was replaced by a limestone mill, which was converted to the electric power plant that provided the first electricity for Clifton homes and businesses. A three-story school known as Rock School was built around 1870 and served the community for more than 20 years. In 1893, a new building was constructed on property donated to the Clifton school system.

In 1880, the Gulf, Colorado and Santa Fe Railway built a station a mile south of Clifton. Merchants moved their businesses closer to the railroad station, and the town thrived as a business and trade center. The Merchant Exchange and Flour Mill, the first steam flour mill in the Bosque valley, was established in 1887 or 1888. The Clifton Record, a newspaper that began publishing in 1895 under the ownership of W. C. O'Brian, continued to serve the community. Clifton served as the county seat between 1890 and 1892. Clifton Lutheran College, later known as Clifton College, opened in 1896. The community was incorporated in 1901. An earlier attempt at incorporation in 1891 failed when the election results were declared invalid. A fire on December 23, 1906, destroyed a large portion of the business district, which was eventually rebuilt. The Clifton Volunteer Fire Department was organized in 1907. The town's need for a hospital was met by Dr. V. D. Goodall and Dr. S. L. Witcher, who formed the Goodall-Witcher Hospital in 1938, which is still operating today, along with the Clifton Clinic. The Lutheran Sunset Home for the elderly was established in Clifton in 1954. In 1991, the Bosque River flooded much of the town due to torrential rains. The town had an estimated population of 204 in 1904 and 3,542 in 2000. It now had a 2020 population of 3,465.

On December 21, 1929, a weather station near Clifton recorded 24 inches of snowfall. This is the greatest daily snowfall recorded anywhere in Texas.

On January 15, 2017, an EF1 tornado struck Clifton, damaging at least 25 homes. Although no injuries were reported, the heaviest damage was near the intersection of Pecan Street and Avenue G.

== Geography ==
According to the United States Census Bureau, the city has a total area of 1.9 sq mi (4.9 km^{2}), all land.

=== Climate ===
The climate in this area is characterized by hot, humid summers and generally mild to cool winters. According to the Köppen climate classification, Clifton has a humid subtropical climate, Cfa on climate maps.

== Demographics ==
Historical population
Census	Pop.	Note	%±
1880	113		—
1890	204		80.5%
1910	1,137		—
1920	1,327		16.7%
1930	1,367		3.0%
1940	1,732		26.7%
1950	1,837		6.1%
1960	2,335		27.1%
1970	2,578		10.4%
1980	3,063		18.8%
1990	3,195		4.3%
2000	3,542		10.9%
2010	3,442		−2.8%
2020	3,465		0.7%
U.S. Decennial Census

=== 2020 census ===
Racial composition as of the 2020 census
Race	Number	Percentage
White	2,351	67.8%
Black or African American	91	2.6%
American Indian and Alaska Native	33	1.0%
Asian	27	0.8%
Native Hawaiian and other Pacific Islander	0	0%
Some other race	424	12.2%
Two or more races	539	15.6%
Hispanics or Latinos (of any race)	1,036	29.9%

As of the 2020 census, Clifton had a population of 3,465, 1,350 households, and 925 families residing in the city. The median age was 45.2 years; 22.9% of residents were under 18 and 27.6% were 65 or older. For every 100 females, there were 88.1 males, and for every 100 females 18 and over, there were 84.2 males 18 and over.

Of the 1,350 households, 29.9% had children under 18 living in them, 44.4% were married-couple households, 16.5% were households with a male householder and no spouse or partner present, and 32.2% were households with a female householder and no spouse or partner present. About 33.7% of all households were made up of individuals, and 21.5% had someone living alone who was 65 or older.

The city had 1,512 housing units, of which 10.7% were vacant. Among occupied housing units, 62.1% were owner-occupied and 37.9% were renter-occupied. The homeowner vacancy rate was 1.6% and the rental vacancy rate was 9.9%.

None of the residents lived in urban areas, while 100.0% lived in rural areas.

=== 2000 census ===
As of the 2000 census, 3,542 people, 1,296 households, and 864 families were residing in the city. The population density was 1,852.2 inhabitants per square mile (715.1/km^{2}). The 1,422 housing units had an average density of 743.6 per square mile (287.1/km^{2}). The racial makeup of the city was 86.02% White, 3.36% African American, 0.34% Native American, 0.17% Asian 8.98% from other races, and 1.13% from two or more races. Hispanics or Latinos of any race were 18.83% of the population.

Of the 1,296 households, 31.9% had children under 18 living with them, 54.2% were married couples living together, 9.9% had a female householder with no husband present, and 33.3% were not families. About 31.3% of all households were made up of individuals, and 20.4% had someone living alone who was 65 or older. The average household size was 2.46, and the average family size was 3.09.

In the city, the age distribution was 25.0% under 18, 6.6% from 18 to 24, 22.3% from 25 to 44, 18.9% from 45 to 64, and 27.2% who were 65 or older. The median age was 42 years. For every 100 females, there were 81.6 males. For every 100 females 18 and over, there were 75.1 males.

The median income in the city for a household was $29,867 and for a family was $41,548. Males had a median income of $27,472 versus $25,154 for females. The per capita income for the city was $14,823. About 9.6% of families and 12.7% of the population were below the poverty line, including 14.0% of those under 18 and 20.0% of those 65 or over.

== Culture ==
In May 1997, the Texas Legislature officially designated Clifton as the Norwegian Capital of Texas. Clifton and the surrounding area were settled by Norwegian immigrants in the mid-19th century. The nearby community of Norse is the final resting place of Cleng Peerson, commonly recognized as the "Father of Norwegian immigration to America." The founder of Norse was Ole Canuteson (Ole Knudsen) from the Stavanger region of Norway.

Visitors to Clifton may explore the vast collection of pioneer Norwegian articles at the Bosque Memorial Museum or take the Cleng Peerson Memorial Highway west to the Norse Historic District. Sites along the route include many 19th-century homes and churches. Among them is Our Savior's Lutheran Church, which was established in 1869. The church is the annual site of the Norse Smorgasbord, a feast of traditional foods introduced to the area by Norwegian settlers. Further down the road, a lutefisk dinner is held annually in Cranfills Gap, near the site of the historic St. Olaf Kirke, often called the Old Rock Church.

Clifton celebrates its Norwegian heritage each year with the Norwegian Country Christmas Tour, held the first Saturday of December. The daylong event features demonstrations of Norwegian crafts, tours of homes and buildings harkening back to the days of the early settlers, and many other related activities. The 1999 tour was a featured Road Trip appearing in the November 1999 issue of Texas Highways.

The City of Clifton was officially designated a Cultural District by the Texas Commission on the Arts and the State of Texas on Saturday, October 22, 2011. Clifton is home to the Bosque Arts Center. Housed in a restored, three-story building that was the former Main Hall of Clifton College, the organization offers a local outlet for visual and performing arts unique for a city of Clifton's size. Among its many offerings are a performing theater, classes in a variety of subjects, an annual photography show, and a nationally recognized art show, the Conservatory Art Classic. Clifton has twice been designated as one of the top 100 small art communities in the nation. It is home to nationally recognized artists, including several members of the prestigious Cowboy Artists of America. Artist Merritt Mauzey received the first Guggenheim Foundation fellowship in fine arts ever awarded to a Texan in 1946. His works are sold locally at the Bosque County Emporium.

== Education ==
Clifton is served by the Clifton Independent School District.

- Clifton High School (grades 9–12)
- Clifton Middle School (grades 6–8)
- Clifton Intermediate School (grades 3–5)
- Clifton Elementary School (prekindergarten-grade 2)

== Local media ==
Clifton and Bosque County are currently listed as part of the Dallas-Fort Worth DMA. However, Bosque County is a neighboring county of the Waco metropolitan area, meaning that all of the Waco/Temple–Killeen market stations also provide coverage for Clifton and Bosque County.

The Clifton Record is the local newspaper.

== Notable people ==
- Dan Campbell, NFL head coach of the Detroit Lions
- Bobby Joe Conrad, NFL wide receiver, Pro Bowl and first-team All-Pro selection
- Zach Duke, MLB pitcher, 2009 All-Star selection
- Bernie Erickson, NFL linebacker
- Jessie James Grelle, anime voice actor
- Merritt Mauzey, printmaker and children's book author/illustrator
- C.E. "Pat" Olsen, founder of Gearench Mfg Co.

== Photo gallery ==
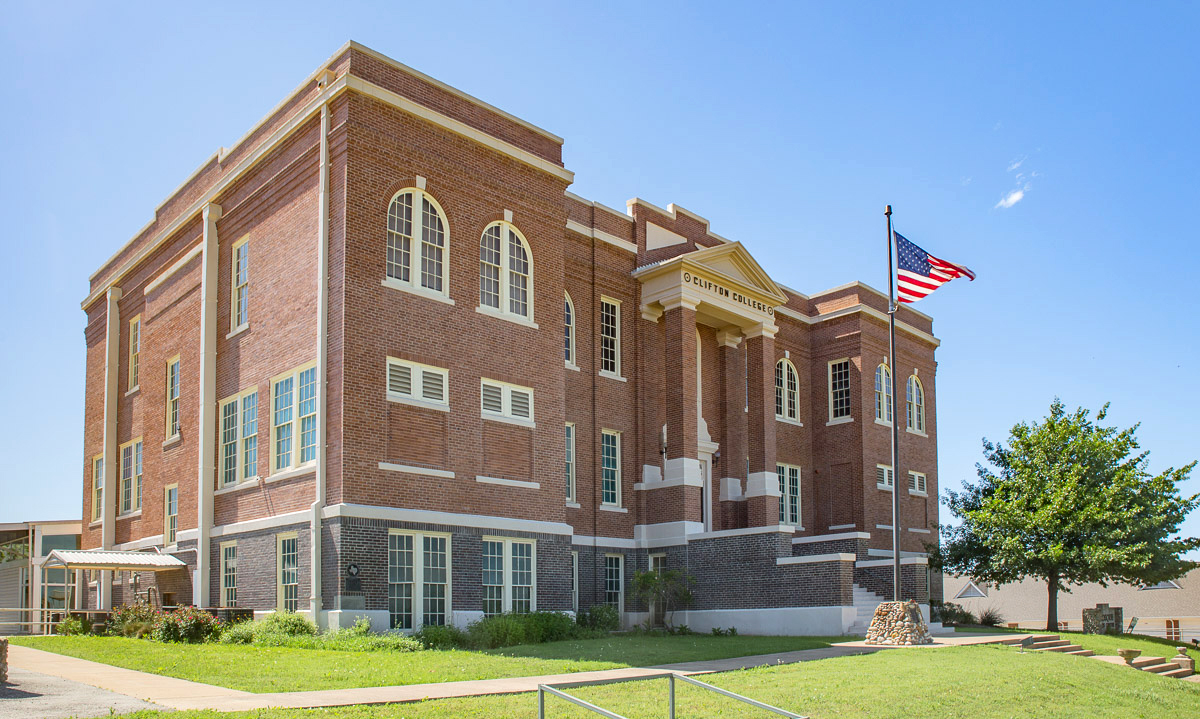
Clifton College Administration Building

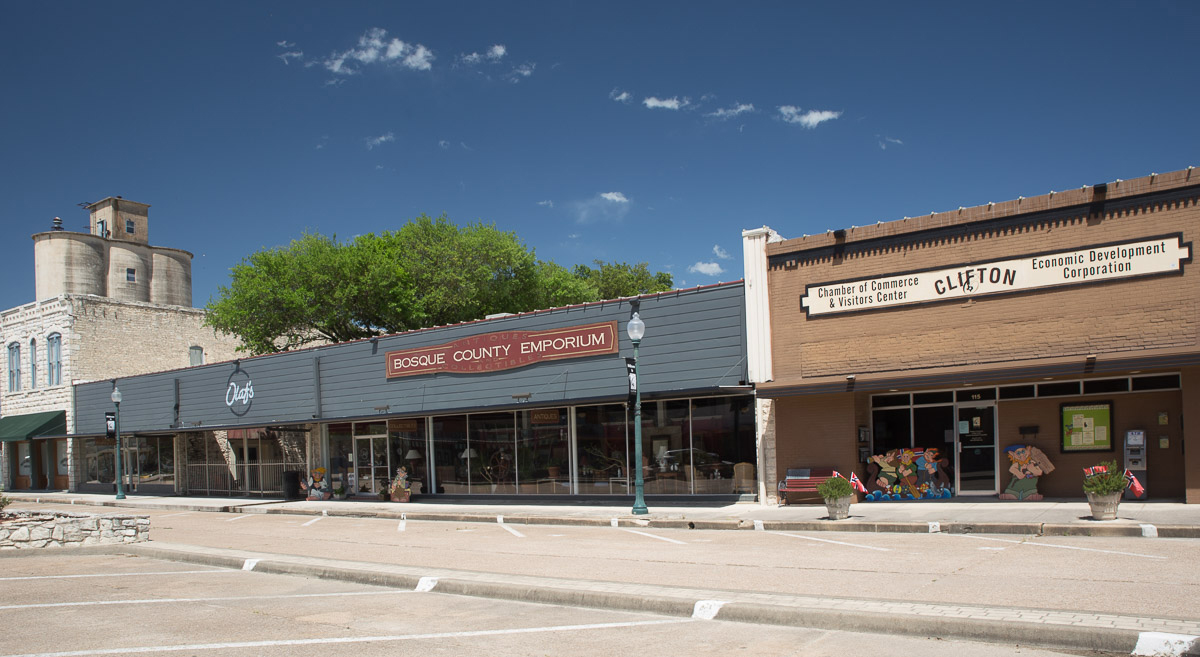
Downtown Clifton

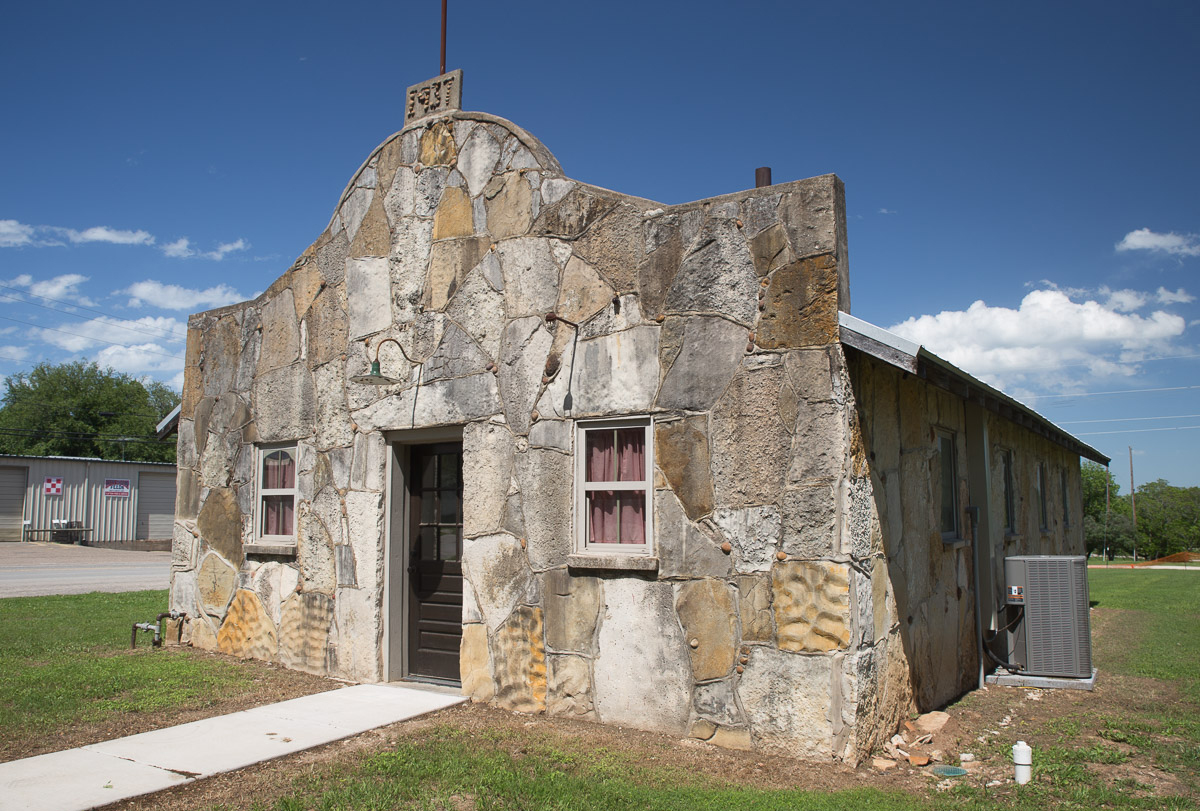
Agricultural and Ranching Complex Building

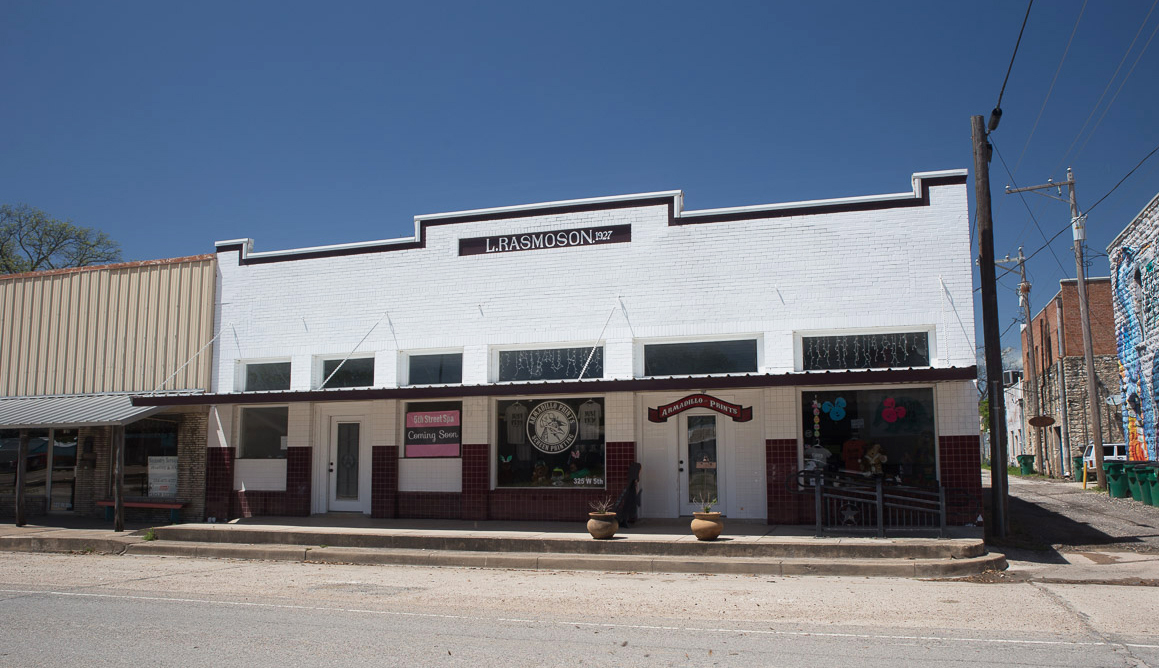
L.Rasmoson Building

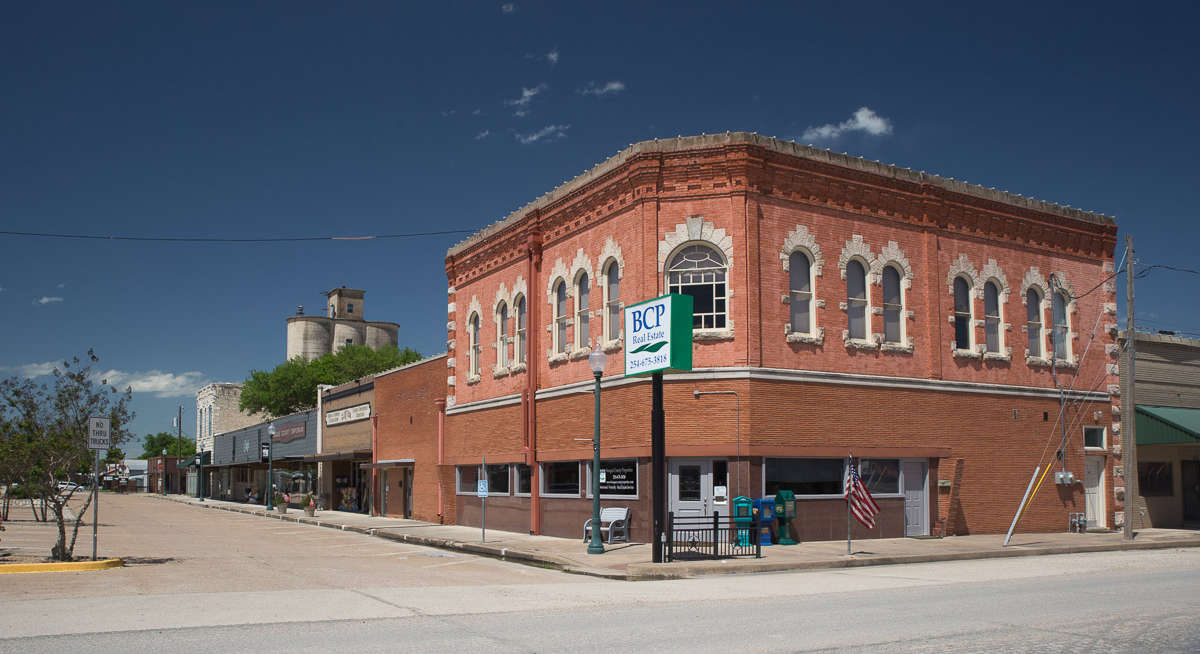
Downtown Clifton

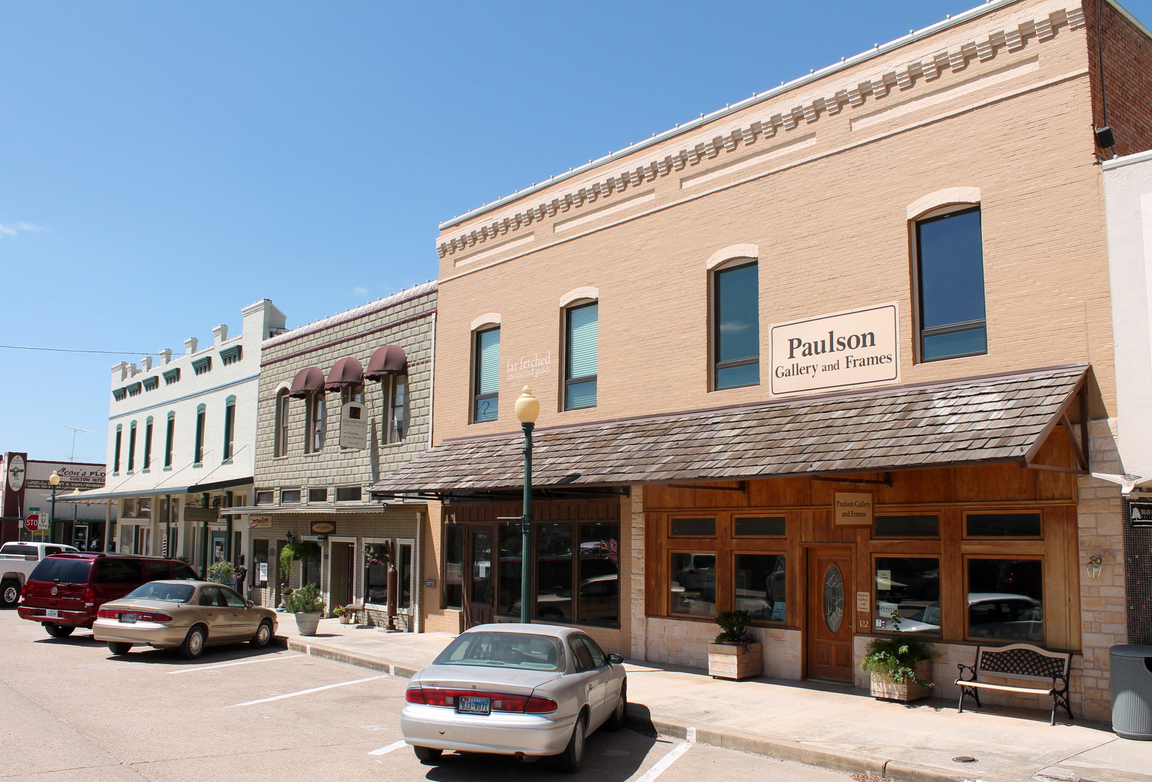
Downtown Clifton

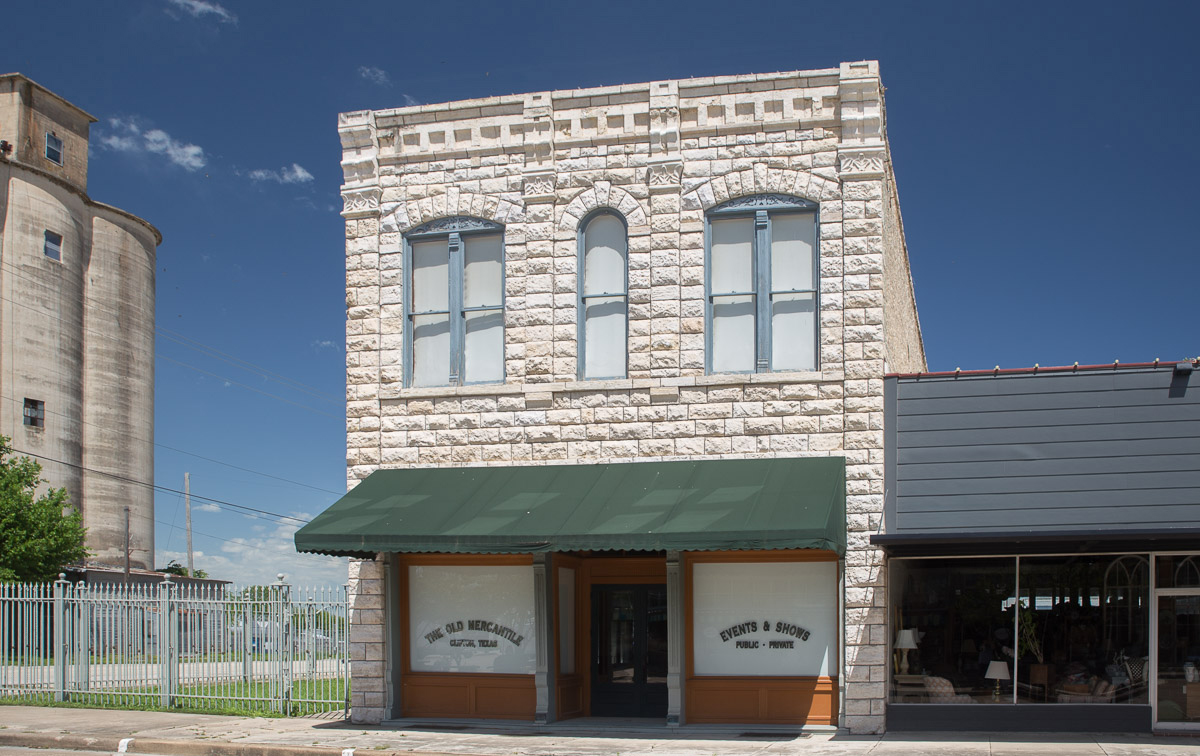
The Old Mercantile Building

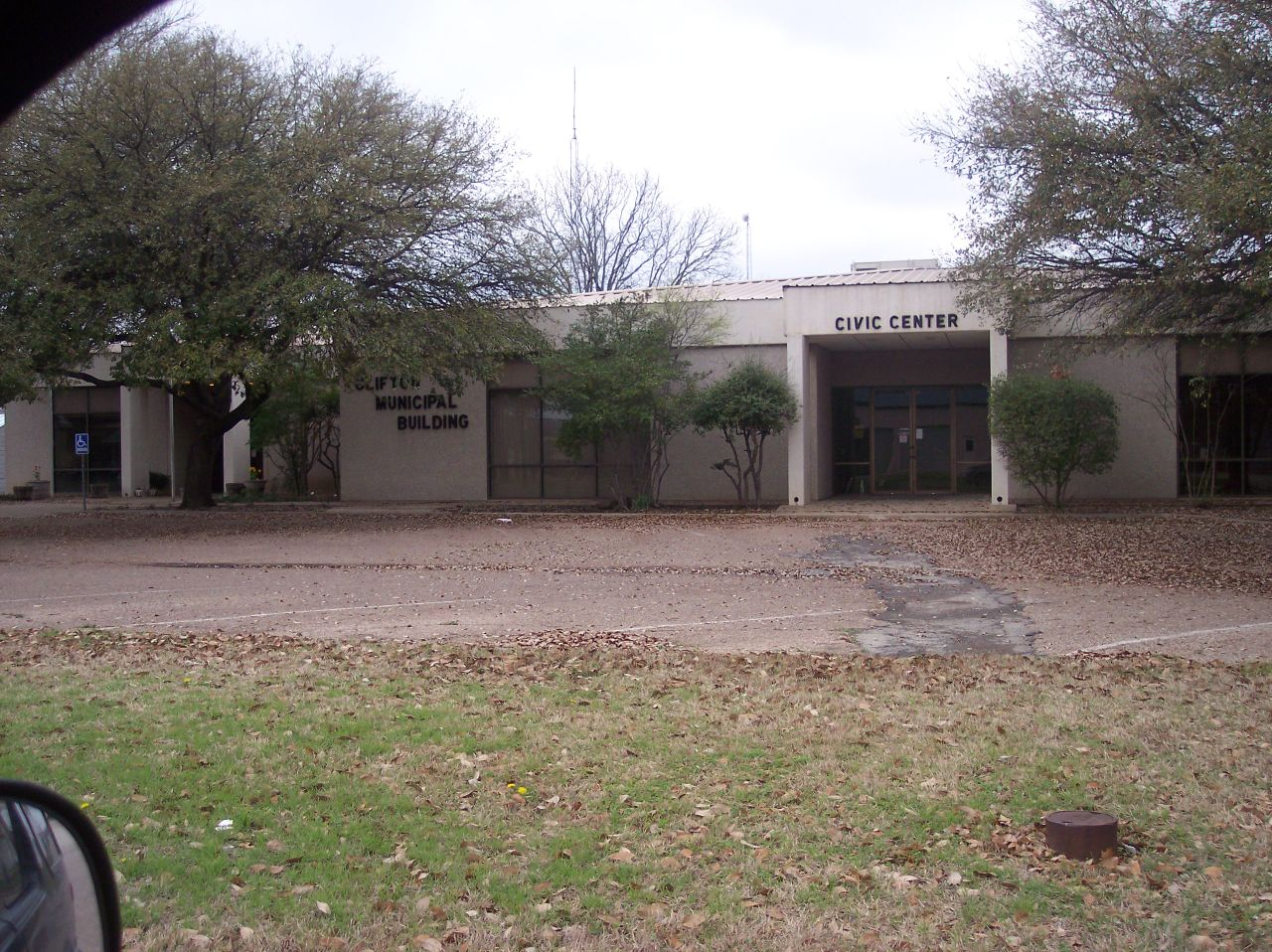
City hall

== See also ==
- List of municipalities in Texas
