= List of museums in North Texas =

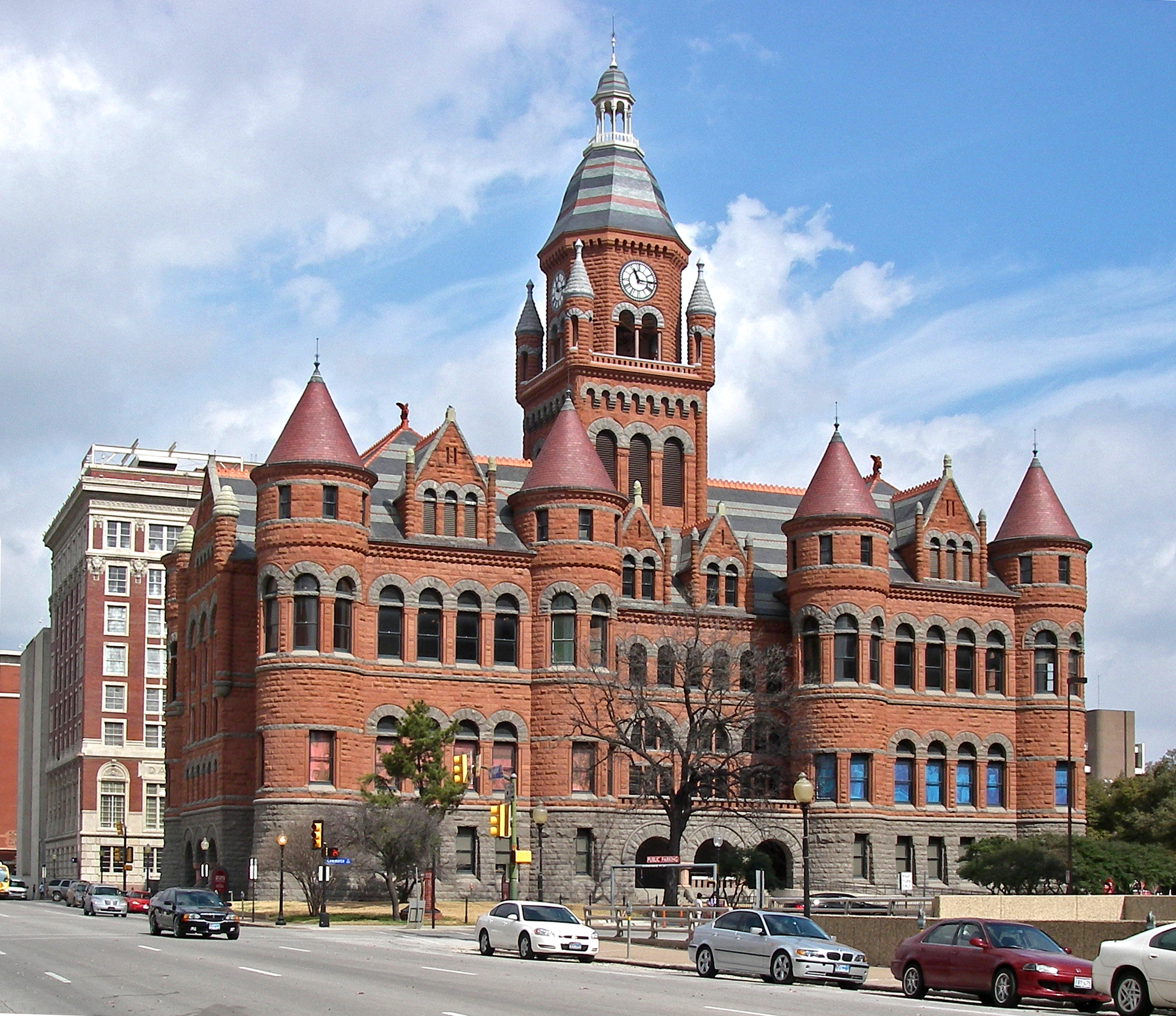
Dallas County Courthouse - Old Red Museum

The list of museums in North Texas encompasses museums defined for this context as institutions (including nonprofit organizations, government entities, and private businesses) that collect and care for objects of cultural, artistic, scientific, or historical interest and make their collections or related exhibits available for public viewing. Also included are non-profit art galleries and exhibit spaces. Museums that exist only in cyberspace (i.e., virtual museums) are not included.

== North Texas ==
North Texas (also commonly called North Central Texas, Northeastern Texas and Nortex) is a distinct cultural and geographic area forming the central-northeastern section of the U.S. state of Texas. North Texas is generally considered to include the area south of Oklahoma, east of Abilene, and north of Waco. North Texas by this definition is more precisely the northern part of the eastern portion of Texas.

Although the terms "Northeastern Texas" or "North Texas" are not official state designations, there are three groups, totaling 30 counties, generally counted as being in this shared North Texas area: the North Central Texas Council of Governments, with 16 counties; the Nortex Regional Planning Commission, with 11 counties; and the Texoma Council of Governments, with 3 counties. For a full list, in one article, see North Texas#Counties.

== Museums in North Texas, listed by county ==
=== Archer - Cottle ===
List of museums in Archer - Collin counties, Texas
Museum name	City	County	Notes	Refs
Allen Heritage Center	Allen	Collin	Local history, photos, clothing, located in a replica depot	
Archer County Historical Museum	Archer City	Archer	National Register of Historic Places listings in Archer County, Texas, State antiquities landmark	
ArtCentre of Plano	Plano	Collin	Non-profit organization supporting the creative arts in and around the Plano area	
Bain-Honaker House	Farmersville	Collin	Operated by the Farmersville Historical Society	
Baylor County Historical Museum	Seymour	Baylor	Local history	
Chestnut Square Historic Village	McKinney	Collin	Historic structures built 1853 to 1918	
Clay County 1890 Jail Museum	Henrietta	Clay	Historic jail and keeper's residence, Recorded Texas Historic Landmark	
Celina Area Heritage Museum	Celina	Collin	Area history	
Heritage Village at Chestnut Square	McKinney	Collin	Recorded Texas Historic Landmark	
Collin County History Museum	McKinney	Collin	Includes Civil War, pioneer life and farming exhibits, operated by the Collin County Historical Society	
Dallas Cowboys World Corporate Headquarters at The Star	Frisco	Collin	Team history and memorabilia	
Frisco Heritage Center	Frisco	Collin	Local history exhibits, period room and industry displays, Heritage Center village of historic homes, a log cabin, one room school house and church	
Heard Natural Science Museum and Wildlife Sanctuary	McKinney	Collin	Natural history	
Heard-Craig Center for the Arts	McKinney	Collin	Texas Recorded Historic Landmark, 1987 NRHP listing	
Heritage Farmstead Museum	Plano	Collin	Blackland Prairie farm culture and history from about 1890 to 1920	
Interurban Railway Museum	Plano	Collin	Transportation	
Museum of the American Railroad	Frisco	Collin	Steam, diesel and passenger railroad equipment	
North Texas Masonic Historical Museum and Library	Plano	Collin		
National Soccer Hall of Fame	Frisco	Collin	Located in the Toyota Stadium	
National Videogame Museum	Frisco	Collin		
Whiteside Museum of Natural History	Seymour	Baylor	Area Permian period fossils, live reptiles and amphibians	
Morton Museum	Gainesville	Cooke	History of Cooke County, operated by the Cooke County Heritage Society, Recorded Texas Historic Landmark	
Muenster Museum	Muenster, Texas	Cooke	AKA Ben and Aggie Fette Seyler Muenster Museum, German heritage artifacts and books	
Santa Fe Depot & Museum	Gainesville	Cooke	Restored depot with related memorabilia	
City-County Heritage Museum	Paducah	Cottle	Exhibits include antiques, farming, ranching and retail businesses	

=== Dallas ===
List of museums in Dallas County, Texas
Museum name	City	County	Notes	Refs
A.W. Perry Homestead Museum	Carrollton	Dallas	Early 20th-century pioneer homestead	
African American Museum of Dallas	Dallas	Dallas	Includes African American folk art, African masks, sculptures, gold weights, and textiles, art reflecting African American culture and history	
The Ann and Gabriel Barbier-Mueller Museum	Dallas	Dallas	Samurai armor collection	
Bath House Cultural Center	Dallas	Dallas	Includes a fine arts gallery and the White Rock Lake Museum with exhibits of natural history	
Cedar Hill Museum of History	Cedar Hill	Dallas	Local history	
Commemorative Air Force Wing	Lancaster	Dallas	Aviation, located at Lancaster Airport	
Crow Collection of Asian Art	Dallas	Dallas	Arts and cultures of China, Japan, India and Southeast Asia	
Dallas Contemporary	Dallas	Dallas	Contemporary art gallery exhibitions	
Dallas Firefighters Museum	Dallas	Dallas	Located in the former fire station opposite Fair Park	
Dallas Heritage Village	Dallas	Dallas	Portrays life in North Texas from 1840 to 1910, located in the Cedars district	
Dallas Holocaust and Human Rights Museum	Dallas	Dallas	History of the Holocaust and the moral and ethical response to prejudice, hatred and indifference for the benefit of all humanity	
Dallas Museum of Art	Dallas	Dallas	Art	
Farmers Branch Historical Park	Farmers Branch	Dallas	27 acres, includes 1856 Gilbert House, a train depot, school, 1930s Dodson House, 1885 Victorian cottage, 1890s church	
Florence Ranch Homestead	Mesquite	Dallas	Late 19th-century settler's homestead	
Frontiers of Flight Museum	Dallas	Dallas	History behind the earliest aviators to modern astronauts, balloons and Zeppelins, the Wright brothers, World War I & II commercial and general flight and the ongoing space program	
Garland Landmark Museum	Garland	Dallas	in Garland's former Santa Fe depot	
Hall of State	Dallas	Dallas	Exhibits of city history and culture, operated by the Dallas Historical Society	
Heritage House	Irving	Dallas	Early 20th-century period house, operated by the Irving Heritage Society	
ICR Discovery Center for Science & Earth History	Dallas	Dallas	Owned by the Institute for Creation Research	
International Museum of Cultures	Duncanville	Dallas	Anthropology, contemporary indigenous world cultures	
Irving Arts Center	Irving	Dallas	Four galleries and a sculpture garden	
Jesuit Dallas Museum	Dallas	Dallas	Part of the Jesuit College Preparatory School of Dallas, art from 5 continents and 25 countries, spanning 2000 years	
Juanita J. Craft Civil Rights House	Dallas	Dallas	Home of Juanita Craft, area civil rights pioneer	
Latino Cultural Center	Dallas	Dallas	Latino art and culture with an art gallery	
The MAC	Dallas	Dallas	Contemporary art	
Mary Kay Museum	Addison	Dallas	Career of Mary Kay Ash	
Meadows Museum	Dallas	Dallas	Spanish art, part of Southern Methodist University	
Mesquite Arts Center	Mesquite	Dallas	Performing and cultural art center with gallery	
Museum of Biblical Art	Dallas	Dallas	Features art with a Biblical theme, includes the National Center for Jewish Art	
Museum of Earth History	Dallas	Dallas	Young Earth creationist museum based on fundamentalist Christian theology	
Museum of Geometric and MADI Art	Dallas	Dallas	Madí and geometric abstract art	
Mustangs of Las Colinas	Irving	Dallas	One of the largest equestrian sculptures in the world, adjacent museum about the work's creation	
Nasher Sculpture Center	Dallas	Dallas	Modern and contemporary sculpture museum and garden	
Old Red Museum	Dallas	Dallas	County history and culture, located in the former Dallas County Courthouse	
Penn Farm Agricultural History Center	Cedar Hill	Dallas	Located in Cedar Hill State Park, working farm with reconstructed and historic buildings from the mid-1800s through the mid-1900s	
Perot Museum of Nature and Science	Dallas	Dallas	Natural history, science, children's exhibits; formerly Dallas Museum of Nature & science	
Ripley's Believe It or Not!	Grand Prairie	Dallas	Amusement	
Rooming House Museum	Dallas	Dallas	Temporary residence of Lee Harvey Oswald at the time of the John F. Kennedy assassination	
Ruth Paine House Museum	Irving	Dallas	1963 period house where alleged JFK assassin Lee Harvey Oswald spent the night before the assassination	
Sachse Historical Society Museum	Sachse	Dallas	Local history	
Sixth Floor Museum at Dealey Plaza	Dallas	Dallas	Life, times, death and legacy of U.S. President John F. Kennedy, building where alleged assassin Lee Harvey Oswald worked and shot Kennedy	
Texas Fashion Collection	Dallas	Dallas	Fashion exhibitions at the UNT Artspace	
Texas Musicians Museum	Irving	Dallas	Texas musicians and related memorabilia	
UNT ArtSpace Dallas	Dallas	Dallas	Part of the University of North Texas College of Visual Arts and Design, includes the Texas Fashion Collection, located in the University Center Building	

=== Denton ===
List of museums in Denton County, Texas
Museum name	City	County	Notes	Refs
Sue S. Bancroft Women's Leadership Hall	Denton	Denton	Temporarily closed. Located at Texas Woman's University	
Barney Smith's Toilet Seat Art Museum	The Colony	Denton	Collection of toilet seats, originally located in San Antonio. After Smith's 2019 death, the new owner moved the collection to Denton County	
Bayless-Selby House Museum	Denton	Denton	Victorian period home in Denton Historical Park	
Courthouse-on-the-Square Museum	Denton	Denton	Recorded Texas Historic Landmark, National Register of Historic Places	
Denton County African American Museum	Denton	Denton	African American history in Denton County, features early 20th century medical office collection	
Denton Firefighters' Museum	Denton	Denton	Firefighting	
Patterson-Appleton Center for Visual Arts	Denton	Denton	Art, operated by the Greater Denton Arts Council, includes the Meadows and Gough Galleries	
Roanoke Visitor Center and Museum	Roanoke	Denton	Recorded Texas Historic Landmark, Local history, located in a former saloon	
Texas Women's Hall of Fame	Denton	Denton	Women's history, located on the Denton campus of Texas Women's University	
Texas Women's University Art Galleries	Denton	Denton	East and West Galleries in the Fine Arts Building	
UNT Galleries	Denton	Denton	Part of the University of North Texas College of Visual Arts and Design, includes the University of North Texas Art Gallery, Cora Stafford Gallery, Lightwell Gallery and North Gallery	

=== Ellis - Erath ===
List of museums in Ellis and Erath counties, Texas
Museum name	City	County	Notes	Refs
Ellis County Museum	Waxahachie	Ellis	Recorded Texas Historic Landmark, National Register of Historic Place	
Ennis Railroad and Cultural Heritage Museum	Ennis	Ellis	Local history, railroad memorabilia	
Ben Hogan Museum	Dublin	Erath	Life and career of golfer Ben Hogan	
Dublin Bottling Works	Dublin	Erath	Historic working bottling works with W.P. Kloster Museum of Dr. Pepper memorabilia	
Dublin Historical Museum	Dublin	Erath	Local history and memorabilia, operated by the Dublin Historical Society, exhibits include Ben Hogan, collection Big Little Books, military artifacts	
Dublin Rodeo Heritage Museum	Dublin	Erath	American West, Rodeo photos, saddles, media related to when Dublin, Texas hosted one of the biggest rodeo companies in world during the late 1930s, 1940s and 1950s	
Stephenville Historical House Museum	Stephenville	Erath	Recorded Texas Historic Landmark, National Register of Historic Places. 19th-century buildings furnished with period furniture and artifacts, including log cabins, a ranch house, a rock cottage, a two-story Victorian house, a chapel, and a school house	
The National Health and Public Safety History Museum	Dublin	Erath	History of America's health and public safety records	
W.K. Gordon Center for Industrial History of Texas	Mingus	Erath	Affiliated with Tarleton State University	
W. K. Gordon Center for Industrial History of Texas	Thurber	Erath	Operated by Tarleton State University, development of the coal, brick, and petroleum industries in the Thurber area	

=== Fannin - Foard ===
List of museums in Fannin and Foard counties, Texas
Museum name	City	County	Notes	Refs
Creative Arts Center	Bonham	Fannin	Community arts center with exhibits	
Fannin County Museum of History	Bonham	Fannin	Local history	
Fort Inglish	Bonham	Fannin	Replica mid 19th-century fort, includes a frontier cabin, a trading post, and blacksmith shop, open seasonally	
Leonard Historic Museum	Leonard	Fannin	Local history Photos, antique Native American pottery	
Mama Muriel's Doll Museum	Leonard	Fannin	Dolls dating back to the mid-1800s	
Sam Rayburn Museum	Bonham	Fannin	Life of former Texas congressman and Speaker of the United States House of Representatives Sam Rayburn, operated by the Dolph Briscoe Center for American History	
Samuel T. Rayburn House	Bonham	Fannin	20th century home of Sam Rayburn, NRHP listing in Fannin County	
Whitewright Historical and Nature Park	Whitewright	Fannin	Turn of the century home and museum	
Fire Hall Museum	Crowell	Foard	Local history and general area community support	

=== Grayson ===
List of museums in Grayson County, Texas
Museum name	City	County	Notes	Refs
C.S. Roberts House Museum	Sherman	Grayson	1896 Eastlake-Stick Style house, operated by the Sherman Preservation League	
Eisenhower Birthplace State Historic Site	Denison	Grayson	Recorded Texas Historic Landmark, Subject Marker, Local Designation, restored 1890s birthplace of President Dwight Eisenhower	
Grayson County Frontier Village	Denison	Grayson	Recreated frontier village with many historic houses	
Harber Wildlife Museum	Sherman	Grayson	Collection of big game animals in dioramas and African artifacts	
Outlaw Trails Museum	Sherman	Grayson	Antiques and memorabilia	
Perrin Air Force Base Historical Museum	Denison	Grayson	History of the Perrin Air Force Base	
Red River Railroad Museum	Denison	Grayson	Railroad artifacts, equipment, memorabilia, photos, caboose and railroad cars	
Sherman Jazz Museum	Sherman	Grayson	Memorabilia of jazz LPs, videos, music player antiques	
Sherman Museum	Sherman	Grayson	aka the Old Sherman Public Library, Recorded Texas Historic Landmark, National Register of Historic Places	
Van Alstyne Historical Museum	Van Alstyne	Grayson	Historical artifacts and information, operated by the Van Alstyne Historical Society	

=== Hardeman - Hunt ===
List of museums in Hardeman - Hunt counties
Museum name	City	County	Notes	Refs
Hardeman County Historical Jail Museum	Quanah	Hardeman	Historic jail and keeper's residence, Recorded Texas Historical Landmark	
Medicine Mound Museums	Medicine Mound	Hardeman	Recorded Texas Historic Landmark, National Register of Historic Places	
Quanah Acme & Pacific Railroad Museum	Quanah	Hardeman	Designed b Charles Henry Page and his brother Louis Charles Page	
Granbury Doll House Museum	Granbury	Hood	Children's museum	
Hood County Jail Museum	Granbury	Hood	Built in 1885	
Aviation Unmanned Vehicle Museum	Caddo Mills	Hunt County	Military drone museum	
Audie Murphy American Cotton Museum	Greenville	Hunt County	The Audie L. Murphy Memorial VA Hospital transferred its Murphy memorabilia here	
Northeast Texas Children's Museum	Commerce	Hunt County	Hands-on exhibits for children	

=== Jack - Kaufman ===
List of museums in Jack- Kaufman counties
Museum name	City	County	Notes	Refs
Fort Richardson State Park and Historic Site	Jacksboro	Jack	Restored post-Civil War fort buildings	
Jack County Museum	Jacksboro	Jack	Built in 1882, 19th century artifacts at the Jack County Museum, including the Powell log cabin and furnishings.	
The Chisholm Trail Outdoor Museum	Cleburne	Johnson	AKA Big Bear Native American Museum	
Gone With the Wind Remembered Museum	Cleburne	Johnson	Memorabilia related to the movie	
Johnson County Courthouse Museum	Cleburne	Johnson	Historic artifacts and records	
Layland Museum of History	Cleburne	Johnson	Recorded Texas Historic Landmark, National Register of Historic Places. Located in the NRHP 1904 Carnegie Library Building	
No. 1 British Flying Training School Museum	Terrell	Kaufman	World War II related	
Spellman Museum of Forney History	Forney	Kaufman	Memorabilia	
Terrell Heritage Museum	Terrell	Kaufman	Located in the former Carnegie Library	

=== Montague - Navarro ===
List of museums in Montague - Navarro counties
Museum name	City	County	Notes	Refs
Horton Classic Car Museum	Nocona	Montague		
International Artillery Museum	Saint Jo	Montague	deactivated military equipment	
Stonewall Saloon	Saint Jo	Montague	Located on the Chisholm Trail	
Tales 'N' Trails Museum	Nocona	Montague	Native American artifacts and European trade goods	
Lefty Frizzell Museum	Corsicana	Navarro	Country western music	
The Pearce Collections at Navarro College	Corsicana	Navarro	American western art and Civil War collections	
Pelham Community History Museum	Pelham	Navarro	African American culture	
Pioneer Village	Corsicana	Navarro	Life in the early settlement days of Corsicana	

=== Palo Pinto - Somervell ===
List of museums in Palo Pinto - Somervell counties
Museum name	City	County	Notes	Refs
Gordon Community Library & Museum	Gordon	Palo Pinto	Local history	
Old Jail Museum	Palo Pinto	Palo Pinto	Recorded Texas Historic Landmark, NRHP, Subject Marker	
Doss Heritage and Culture Center	Weatherford	Parker		
Museum of the Americas (Texas)	Weatherford	Parker	Multi-cultural artifacts, crafts, and folk art	
National Vietnam War Museum	Weatherford	Parker		
Vintage Car Museum	Weatherford	Parker		
Rockwall County Courthouse Museum	Rockwall	Rockwall	Local history	
Rockwall County Historical Foundation Museum	Rockwall	Rockwall	Local history	
Zaner Robison Historical Museum	Royse City	Rockwall	Recorded Texas Historic Landmark, National Register of Historic Places	
Barnard's Mill Art Museum	Glen Rose	Somervell		
Creation Evidence Museum	Glen Rose	Somervell		
Dinosaur Valley State Park	Glen Rose	Somervell	National Natural Landmark	
Somervell County Museum	Glen Rose	Somervell	Local history	

=== Tarrant ===
List of museums in Tarrant County, Texas
Museum name	City	Notes	Refs
1895 Room, Tarrant County Courthouse	Fort Worth	Recorded Texas Historic Landmark, National Register of Historic Places	
American Airlines C.R. Smith Museum	Fort Worth	Aviation, history of American Airlines and the air transportation industry	
Amon Carter Museum of American Art	Fort Worth	Paintings, sculptures and photography. Named for Fort Worth publisher Amon G. Carter, founded in 1961 by his children Amon Jr. and Ruth Carter Stevenson	
Arlington Museum of Art	Arlington	Contemporary Texas art exhibitions	
Ball-Eddleman-McFarland House	Fort Worth	National Register of Historic Places in Tarrant County	
Bull Riding Hall of Fame	Fort Worth	To recognize bull riders, bullfighters, bulls, stock contractors, and other notables	
Cattle Raisers Museum	Fort Worth		
Christian Arts Museum	Fort Worth	Works of art created by mother and daughter sculptors	
DFW Elite Toy Museum	Haltom City		
Euless Heritage Museum	Euless	Historical artifacts dating 1880–1990	
Fielder House	Arlington	Local history, operated by the Arlington Historical Society	
Fort Worth Aviation Museum	Fort Worth	North Texas aviation, includes WWII aircraft, some of which were built in Fort Worth	
Fort Worth Museum of Science and History	Fort Worth	Local history	
Fuller House	Euless	Great Depression era house built by former Euless mayor Homer Fuller	
Gallery at UTA	Arlington	Part of the Fine Arts building of the University of Texas at Arlington	
Grand and Tower Galleries	Grapevine		
Grapevine Commercial Historic District	Grapevine	NRHP, local history, including the Torian Cabin Museum	
Himes log house	Euless	Restored 1850s log cabin	
International Bowling Museum	Arlington	Sports, bowling history, includes the International Bowling Hall of Fame	
Kimbell Art Museum	Fort Worth	Created by the estate of entrepreneur Kay Kimbell	
Knapp Heritage Park	Arlington	Operated by the Arlington Historical Society	
Lake Worth Museum	Lake Worth		
Leonard's Department Store Museum	Fort Worth	Memorabilia	
Lenora Rolla Heritage Center Museum	Fort Worth	African-American	
Log Cabin Village	Fort Worth	Living history museum	
Lone Star Hi-Railers Model Train Exhibit	Grapevine	Railroad memorabilia located in a restored depot	
Mansfield Historical Museum	Mansfield	Local history, operated by the Mansfield Historical Society	
Military Museum of Fort Worth	Fort Worth	Artifacts and history of veterans and combat units connected to Texas from the 20th century through today, including World War I, World War II, Korea, Vietnam, and the Gulf Wars. Featured is a gallery of "Hometown Heros" that tells the story of notable Fort Worth natives including Amon G. Carter Jr., Clarence Brewster, Howard Scott and more	
Modern Art Museum of Fort Worth	Fort Worth	Post WWII art	
Nash Farm	Grapevine	Mid 19th-century working farm	
National Cowgirl Museum and Hall of Fame	Fort Worth	American West, famous cowgirls, memorabilia	
National Multicultural Western Heritage Museum	Fort Worth	Cowboy contributions of Hispanic Americans, Native Americans, European Americans, and African Americans	
Settlement to City Museums	Grapevine	Features three historic period buildings, the 1888 Keeling House Museum with local history displays, the 1910 Cotton Ginner's Museum about the area cotton industry, and the 1900 Donald Schoolhouse	
Sid Richardson Museum	Fort Worth	Works of Frederic Remington and Charles Russell and other works about the American West	
Stockyards Museum	Fort Worth	History of the Fort Worth Stockyards Company and the meatpacking industry	
Tandy Leather Museum & Gallery	Fort Worth	Leather art	
Texas Civil War Museum	Fort Worth	Opened in 2006 by oilman Ray Ritchey	
Texas Cowboy Hall of Fame	Fort Worth	American West, established in 1997, moved to the Fort Worth Stockyards in 2000	
Texas Rodeo Cowboy Hall of Fame	Fort Worth	Founded in 1975. Located in the Cowtown Coliseum in the Fort Worth Stockyards	
Texas Trail of Fame	Fort Worth	Located at Fort Worth Stockyards, it honors individuals who have contributed to the American West	
Torian Cabin Museum	Grapevine	Recorded Texas Historic Landmark	
Vintage Flying Museum	Fort Worth	Restored historic aircraft	
White Settlement Historical Museum	White Settlement	Local history	

=== Wichita-Wilbarger-Wise ===
List of museums in Wichita-Wilbarger-Wise Counties, Texas
Museum name	City	County	Notes	Refs
Kell House Museum	Wichita Falls	Wichita	Recorded Texas Historic Landmark, historic house	
Kemp Center for the Arts	Wichita Falls	Wichita	Arts center with exhibit galleries, performing arts, operated by the Arts Council of Wichita Falls Area	
Museum of North Texas History	Wichita Falls	Wichita	Includes Native American artifacts, cowboy hat collection, oil industry memorabilia, wedding gowns, ship models, period displays, model trains,	
Professional Wrestling Hall of Fame and Museum	Wichita Falls	Wichita	History of professional wrestling	
Sheppard Air Force Base Heritage Center	Wichita Falls	Wichita		
Wichita Falls Fire & Police Museum	Wichita Falls	Wichita	Historic fire engines, equipment and police cruisers, open the 1st Saturday of the month	
Wichita Falls Museum of Art	Wichita Falls	Wichita	Part of Midwestern State University	
Wichita Falls Railroad Museum	Wichita Falls	Wichita	Railroad memorabilia, closed due to Covid	
Red River Valley Museum	Vernon	Wilbarger	Includes mounted wild game displays, ranching, pioneer and period business displays, Roy Orbison and Jack Teagarden exhibits, sculptures of Electra Waggoner Biggs	
Wilbarger County Historical Museum	Vernon	Wilbarger	Local history	
Wise County Heritage Museum	Decatur	Wise	Local history: operated by the Wise County Historical Society	
Bridgeport Heritage Museum	Bridgeport	Wise	Local history: coal mining, railroads, natural gas, housed in the lower floor of the Bridgeport Visitors	

=== Young ===
List of museums in Young County, Texas
Museum name	City	County	Notes	Refs
Fort Belknap Museum and Archives	Newcastle	Young	NRHP	
Old Post Office Museum & Art Center	Graham	Young	Local history and art	
Olney Heritage Museum	Olney	Young	Founded by the L.F. and Carla Perry Foundation to preserve local culture	
Robert E. Richeson Memorial Museum	Graham	Young	World War II memorabilia including munitions, uniforms, items of everyday military life and model aircraft, open by appointment	
Young County Museum of History and Culture	Graham	Young	Local History and Cultures. Operated by the Wichita Falls Alliance for Arts and Culture	

== Defunct museums ==
- The American Museum of the Miniature Arts, Dallas
- Arlington Sewing Machine Museum, Arlington
- Cavanaugh Flight Museum, Addison, closed in 2024
- Conspiracy Museum, Dallas, closed in 2006
- Fire Station No.1, Fort Worth, former satellite museum of the Fort Worth Museum of Science and History, closed in 2016
- Hangar 10 Flying Museum, Denton
- Hayden Museum of American Art, Paris, closed in 2010
- Owens Spring Creek Farm, Richardson, operated by Bob Evans Farms, Inc., closed in 2013
- Pate Museum of Transportation, Cresson, closed in 2009
- Texas Civil War Museum, White Settlement, the largest American Civil War museum west of the Mississippi River, closed in 2024
- The Women's Museum, Dallas, closed in 2011

== See also ==
- List of museums in Texas
- List of museums in East Texas
- List of museums in the Texas Gulf Coast
- List of museums in Central Texas
- List of museums in the Texas Panhandle
- List of museums in South Texas
- List of museums in West Texas
