= Greater Texas & Pan-American Exposition =

1937 World's Fair held in Texas, US

The Greater Texas & Pan-American Exposition was a World's Fair held at Fair Park in Dallas, Texas (USA). The exhibition promoted the city of Dallas as the cultural and economic capital of an emerging Pan-American civilization stretching from Tierra del Fuego to Alaska. It followed the successful Texas Centennial Exposition, which was held to celebrate the centennial anniversary of Texas in 1936. Every exhibition building constructed for the 1936 fair (except the Hall of Negro Life, which was demolished) were simply redecorated for the event, but most major exhibitors (such as General Motors, Ford and Chrysler) did not return in 1937. The event also included the Pan American Olympics, pitting the nations of North, Central, and South America against one another in a series of interracial contests and which led as a precursor for the eventual establishment of the Pan American Games. The sports featured were athletics, boxing and wrestling, among others. This program was considered a success and a meeting of Olympic officials from the Americas was held.

The exhibition ran from June 12, 1937, through October 1937. The exposition failed to live up to expectations, attracting only 2 million visitors (compared to over 6 million for the Texas Centennial).

== See also ==
- Texas Centennial Exposition
- Fair Park
- Hall of State
- History of Dallas, Texas
- History of Dallas, Texas (1930–1945)
