= Polly Smith =

Polly Smith may refer to:

- Polly Smith (inventor), (born 1949), American costume designer and inventor of the sports bra
- Polly Smith (photographer) (1908–1980), American photographer
