= Troop sleeper =

Type of military railroad passenger car

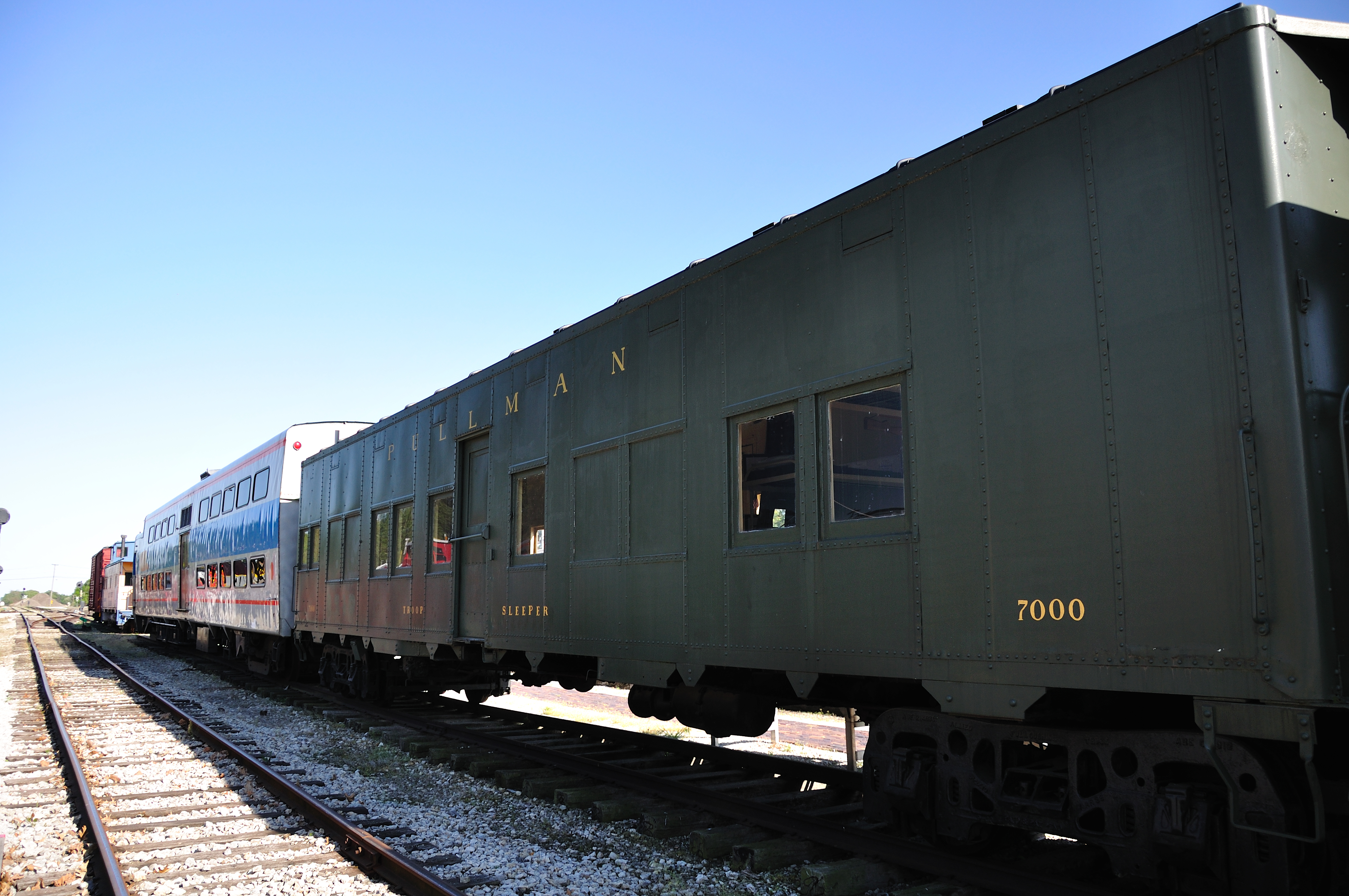
A Pullman-built troop sleeper at the Hoosier Valley Railroad Museum.

In United States railroad terminology, a troop sleeper was a railroad passenger car which had been constructed to serve as something of a mobile barracks (essentially, a sleeping car) for transporting troops over distances sufficient to require overnight accommodations. This method allowed part of the trip to be made overnight, reducing the amount of transit time required and increasing travel efficiency.

== History ==
=== Background and development ===
Between December 1941 and June 1945 U.S. railroads carried almost 44 million armed services personnel. In spring 1943, about half of the Pullman Company's 7,000 sleeper cars were being used to transport troops. As there were not enough cars and coaches available to meet the massive need for troop transit created by World War II, in late 1943 the U.S. Office of Defense Transportation contracted with the Pullman Company to build 2,400 troop sleepers, and with American Car and Foundry to build 440 troop kitchen cars.

This new rolling stock was either converted from existing boxcars or built from scratch based on Association of American Railroads standard 50 feet (15.2 m) single-sheathed steel boxcar designs, and were constructed entirely out of steel with heavily reinforced ends. In some instances baggage cars were converted into temporary kitchen cars before ACF could complete its order. The cars were painted the standard Pullman Green and affixed with gold lettering. Along the Atchison, Topeka and Santa Fe Railway's "Surf Line," trains consisting of 10-12 former Southern Pacific interurban trailer cars, owned by the U.S. Maritime Commission but bearing Santa Fe markings, were fitted with conventional knuckle couplers at each end of the trainset and pressed into service to handle the additional passenger loads.

Equipped with special Allied Full Cushion high-speed swing-motion trucks, Pullman troop sleepers were designed to be fully interchangeable with all other passenger equipment. The units came equipped with end doors similar to those found on standard railway cars, but had no vestibules. Loading and unloading of passengers was accomplished via wide doors positioned on each side at the center of the cars with built-in trap doors and steps. Light and ventilation was provided by ten window units mounted on each side, each equipped with rolling black out shades and wire mesh screens.

Troop sleepers, generally intended for use by enlisted personnel, were equipped with bunks stacked 3-high, and slept 29 servicemen plus the Pullman porter. Every passenger was provided with a separate Pullman bed, complete with sheets and pillowcases that were changed daily. The berths were laid out in a cross-wise arrangement that placed the aisle along one side of the car, as opposed to down the center. Though the upper berths were fixed, the middle and lower sections could be reconfigured into seating during the daytime. Weapon racks were provided for each group of berths. Four washstands (two mounted at each end of the car) delivered hot and cold running water. The cars also came outfitted with two enclosed toilets and a drinking water cooler.

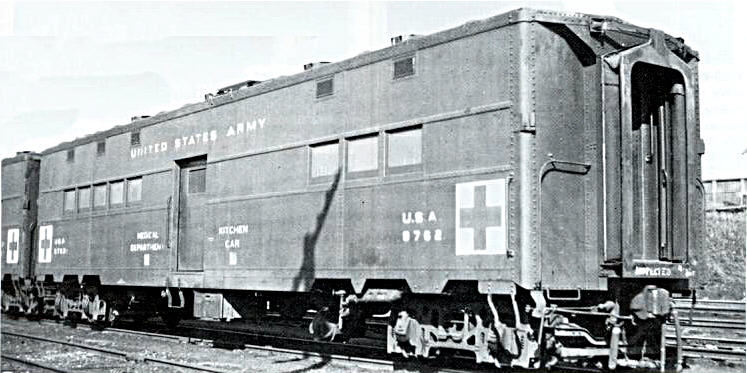
United States Army "Medical Department Kitchen Car" #8762 sits at the Lafayette, Indiana shops of the Monon Railroad on April 17, 1947.

=== Troop kitchens ===
Troop kitchens, rolling galleys, also joined the trains to provide meal service en route (the troops took their meals in their seats or bunks). As the cooking was performed by regular U.S. Army cooks, the cars were outfitted with two Army-standard coal ranges. The cars were also equipped with a pair of 200-US-gallon (760 L; 170 imp gal) cold water tanks and a 40-US-gallon (150 L; 33 imp gal) hot water tank; supplies were stocked on open shelves with marine-type railings, a bread locker, a large refrigerator, and a series of built-in cabinets and drawers. The cars served approximately 250 men each, and were typically placed in the middle of the train so that food could be served from both ends.

Troop hospital cars, also based on the troop sleeper carbody, transported wounded servicemen and typically travelled in solid strings on special trains averaging fifteen cars each. Each had 38 berths for patients, 30 of which were arranged in the central section of the car in three tiers on each side. There was also a section with six berths which could be used for isolation cases as well as private compartments for special cases. Each unit was ice air-conditioned and came fitted with a shower room along with a modern kitchen with the latest equipment.

=== Afterlife and preservation ===
Troop cars saw service through 1947, after which many were declared surplus and sold by the U.S. Army Transportation Corps to the railroads and were subsequently converted into baggage cars, express service boxcars, refrigerator cars, and cabooses, while others remained in sleeper configuration for use as bunk cars by maintenance of way crews. None were converted into Tourist Sleeper use, due to the post-war decline of Tourist Sleepers. the Several Kitchen Cars remained in Department of Defense service, being converted into Guard Cars to accompany sensitive military rail movements, such as military unit equipment deployments, and the Strategic Air Command's mobile B-52 and KC-135 cockpit simulators.

Subsequent conflicts have not created the need for such an arrangement, partially due to the much smaller level of manpower involved but primarily due to the wider use of aircraft for long-distance transportation of troops. Today, preserved troop sleepers and kitchen cars can be seen at several railroad museums and tourist railroads across the United States.

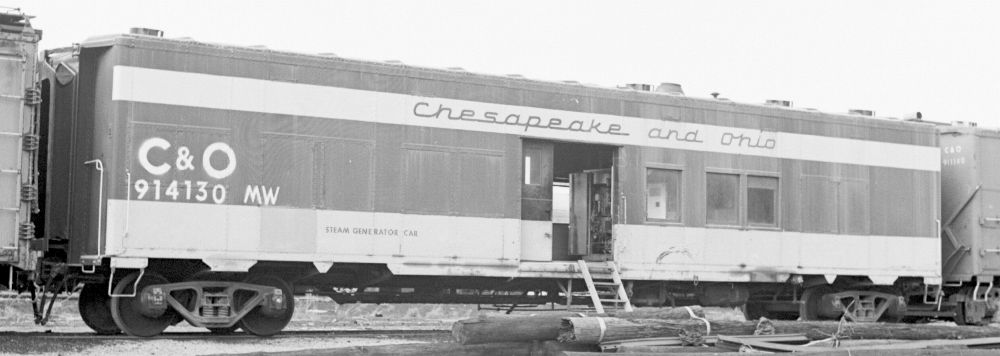
Chesapeake and Ohio Railway #914130, a troop sleeper that has been converted to a steam generator car.

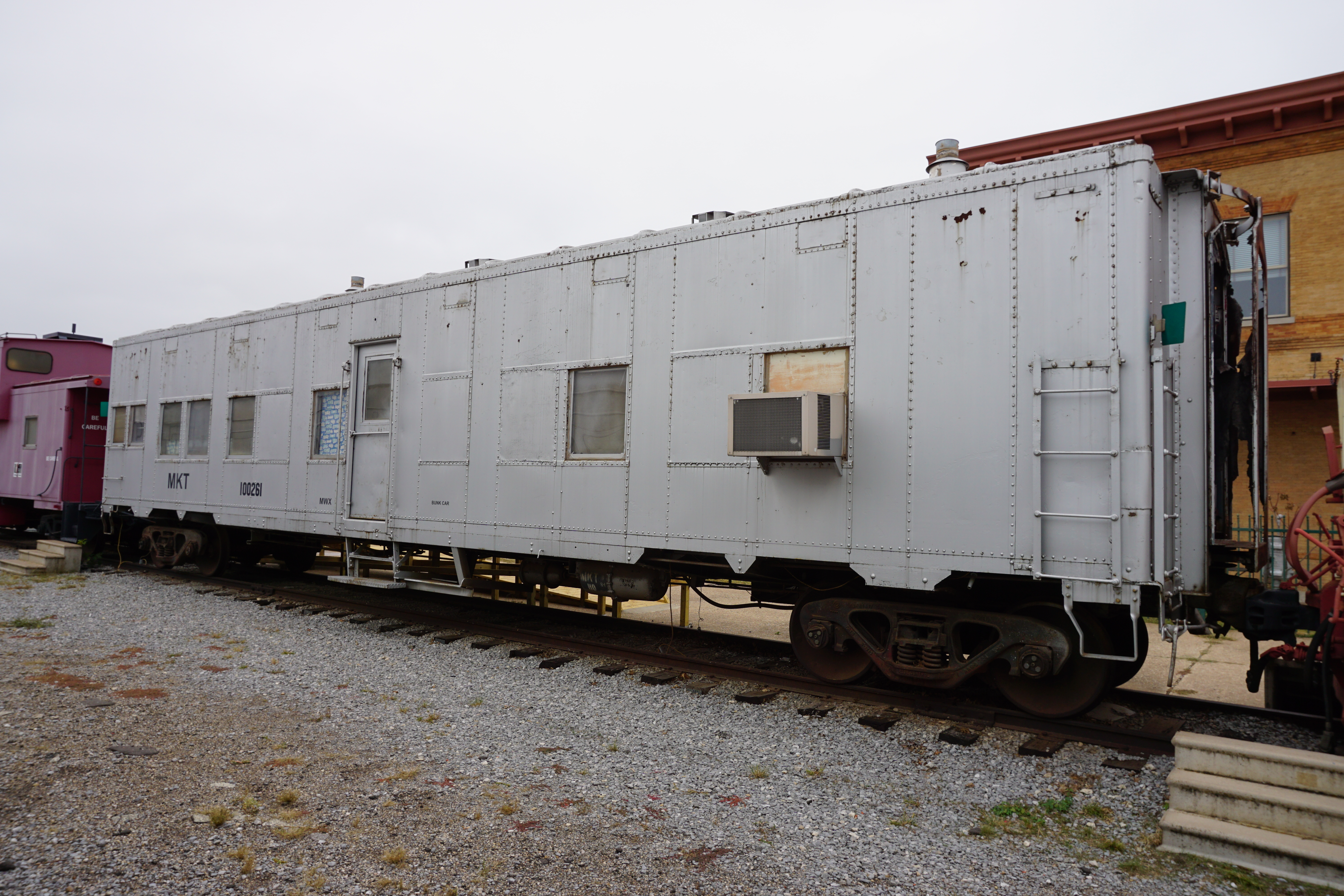
Missouri–Kansas–Texas Railroad #100261, a troop sleeper that is on display at the Wichita Falls Railroad Museum.

Troop sleeper #7437 is on display at the Baltimore & Ohio Railroad Museum in Baltimore, MD. It was purchased as surplus by the Western Maryland Railroad and used on work trains as crew quarters. The museum has restored it to its original outside appearance. The inside has half the beds put back and the other half has displays about B&O's services during the war.

== See also ==
- Forty-and-eights
- U.S. Army Transportation Museum

== References and notes ==
=== Sources ===
- Hediger, Jim. (2002). "Troop kitchen cars." Model Railroader 69 (2) 80–82.
- McGuirk, Marty. (2001). "Troop sleepers." Model Railroader 68 (12) 89–92.
- Pearce, Bill. (2005). "Express Reefer from troop sleeper in N." Model Railroader 72 (12) 62–65.
- Signor, John R., ed. (2004). "Troop Sleepers." The Warbonnet 10 (4) 31.
- Wider, Patrick C. (2001). "Troop cars." Classic Trains 2 (4) 84–87.
