= Texas Centennial Exposition =

1936 exhibition held in Dallas, Texas

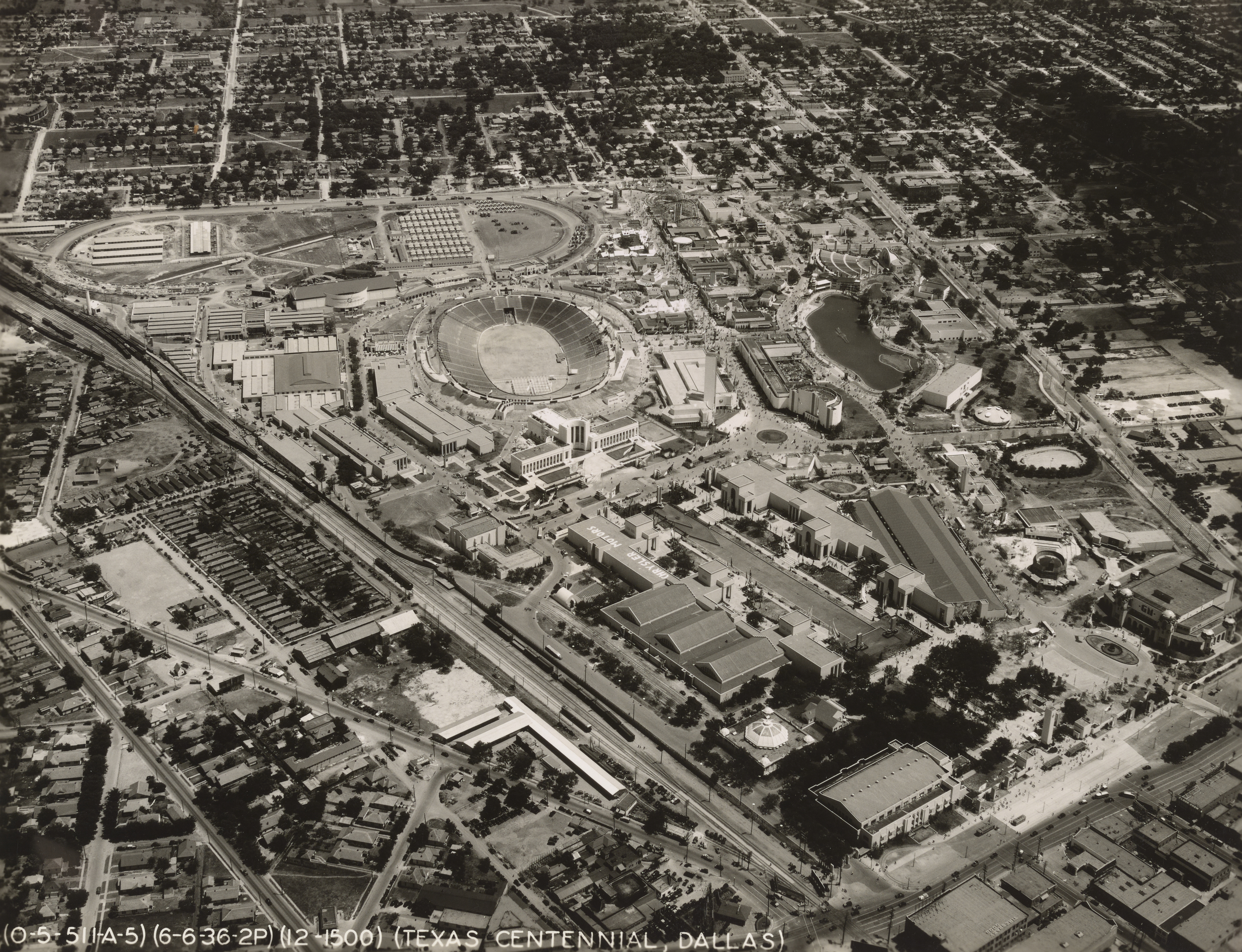
- Aerial view of the Texas Centennial Exposition

Overview
- BIE-class: Unrecognized exposition
- Name: Texas Centennial Exposition
- Visitors: 6 million

Location
- Country: United States
- City: Dallas, Texas

Timeline
- Opening: June 6, 1936
- Closure: November 29, 1936

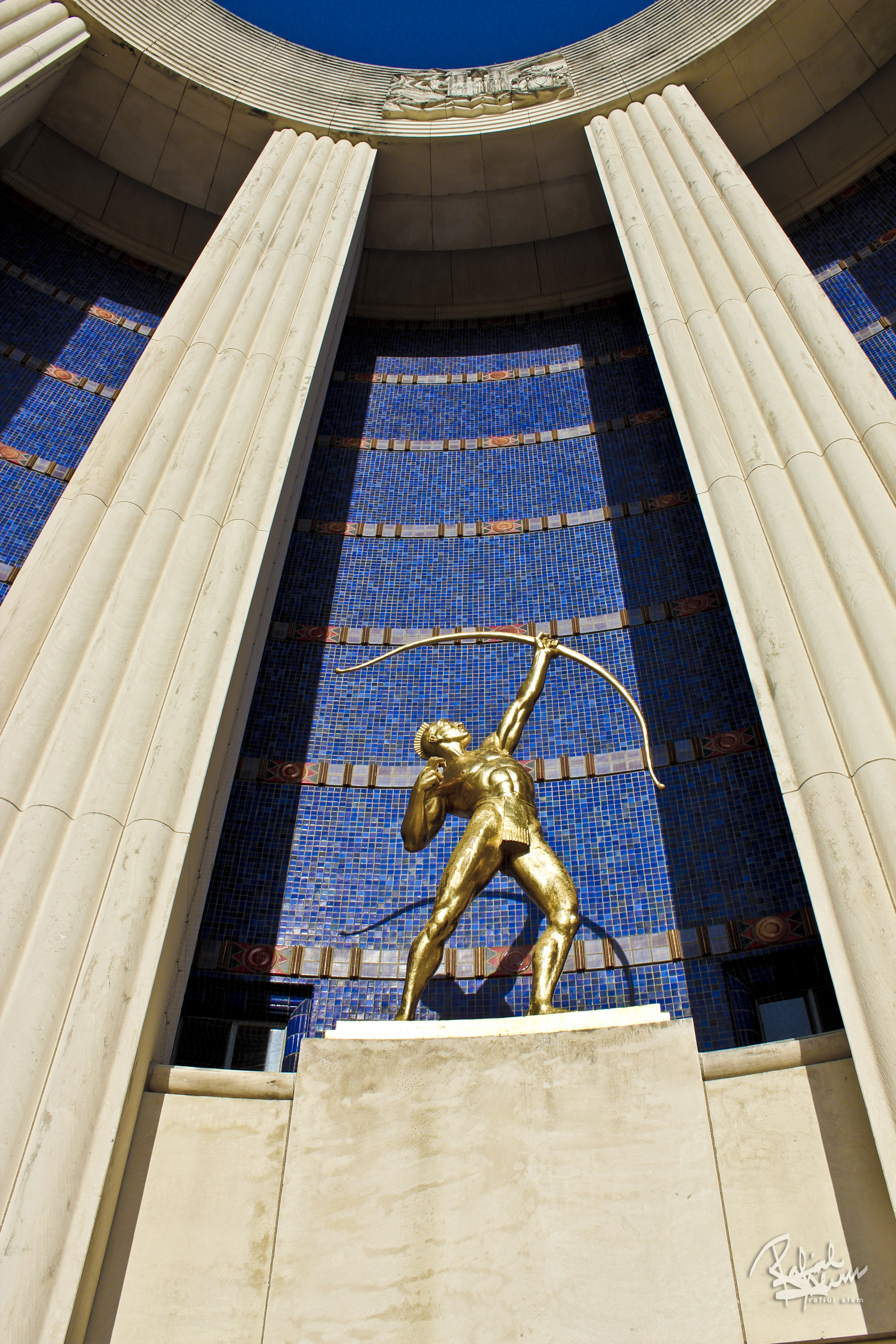
Entrance to the Hall of State (1936), one of the more than 50 buildings constructed for the Texas Centennial Exposition

The Texas Centennial Exposition was a world's fair presented from June 6 to November 29, 1936, at Fair Park, Dallas, Texas. A celebration of the 100th anniversary of Texas's independence from Mexico in 1836, it also celebrated Texas and Western American culture. More than 50 buildings were constructed for the exposition, and many remain today as notable examples of Art Deco architecture. Attracting more than six million people including US President Franklin Roosevelt, the exposition was credited with buffering Dallas from the Great Depression.

== Background ==
The Texas Centennial Exposition was held at Fair Park in Dallas, to celebrate the 100th anniversary of Texas's independence from Mexico in 1836. It was also a celebration of Texas and Western culture. Three Texas cities (Dallas, Houston, and San Antonio) competed to host the exposition, with Dallas receiving the nod from the Texas Centennial Commission because it offered the largest cash commitment ($7,791,000), the existing facilities of the State Fair of Texas, and a strong group of leaders. The bid, which also included a city bond package, was put together by Dallas businessmen led by the banker Robert L. Thornton.

George Dahl was director general of a group of architects who designed the more than 50 buildings constructed for the exposition at Fair Park, a landscaped expanse then comprising 178 acres. Some 30 of the structures remain, representing one of the largest intact groupings of world's fair buildings and open spaces remaining in the United States. Chief among these buildings is the Texas Hall of State, which was not completed until after the opening of the exposition.

== Event ==
Texas Centennial Exposition flag celebrating the 100th anniversary of Texas independence

The Texas Centennial Exposition was held at Fair Park in Dallas, June 6 – November 29, 1936. The event attracted 6,353,827 visitors, and cost around $25 million. The exposition was credited for buffering Dallas from the Great Depression, creating over 10,000 jobs and giving a $50 million boost to the local economy. It did not recover its cost, though the city gained national recognition and income from visitors spending money elsewhere in Dallas.

"Lone Star State Selects Beauties for 100 Year Pageant" (1935 Universal newsreel)

The Cavalcade of Texas, a historical pageant covering four centuries of Texas history, was one of the most popular attractions at the Exposition.

The Hall of Negro Life was another popular attraction and is believed to be the first recognition of African-American culture at a world's fair. The Hall was decorated with four murals by the celebrated painter Aaron Douglas.

The Texas Centennial Olympics, held in the Cotton Bowl, hosted the first integrated public athletic competition in the history of the South. Universal produced a newsreel of preparations for the Centennial beauty pageant, which shows models attempting to fit into life-sized cutouts of the Texas Centennial Committee's concept of the "perfect figure".

The Federal Theatre Project production of Macbeth, adapted and directed by Orson Welles with an all-black cast, was featured August 13–23 in the new band shell and 5,000-seat open-air amphitheatre. The production was one of the most talked-about features of the exposition and drew large audiences. For many it was their first opportunity to see a professional dramatic performance by African American actors. Integrated seating was a unique experience for theatergoers in Dallas.

President Franklin D. Roosevelt visited the exposition in a widely publicized event on June 12. He and Eleanor Roosevelt drew a crowd of 500,000.

Gene Autry's film The Big Show was filmed on location and shows many of the buildings and events of the event.

The Centennial Exposition required a massive publicity effort, but the promotion department was stymied by a lack of photographs. Never before had the state been photographed for advertising purposes. The Centennial Exposition hired Polly Smith to travel the state and tell the story of Texas through photos.

After a successful five-month run, the Texas Centennial Exposition was closed. The exhibits changed and reopened the following year as the Greater Texas & Pan-American Exposition.

== Legacy ==
The Fair Park Texas Centennial Buildings were designated a National Historic Landmark in 1986.

In October 2010, the National Building Museum in Washington, D.C., opened an exhibition titled Designing Tomorrow: America's World's Fairs of the 1930s. This exhibition, which was available for view until September 2011, prominently featured the Texas Centennial Exposition.

== See also ==
- Fair Park
- Hall of State
- History of Dallas, Texas (1930–1945)
