= History of Dallas (1930–1945) =

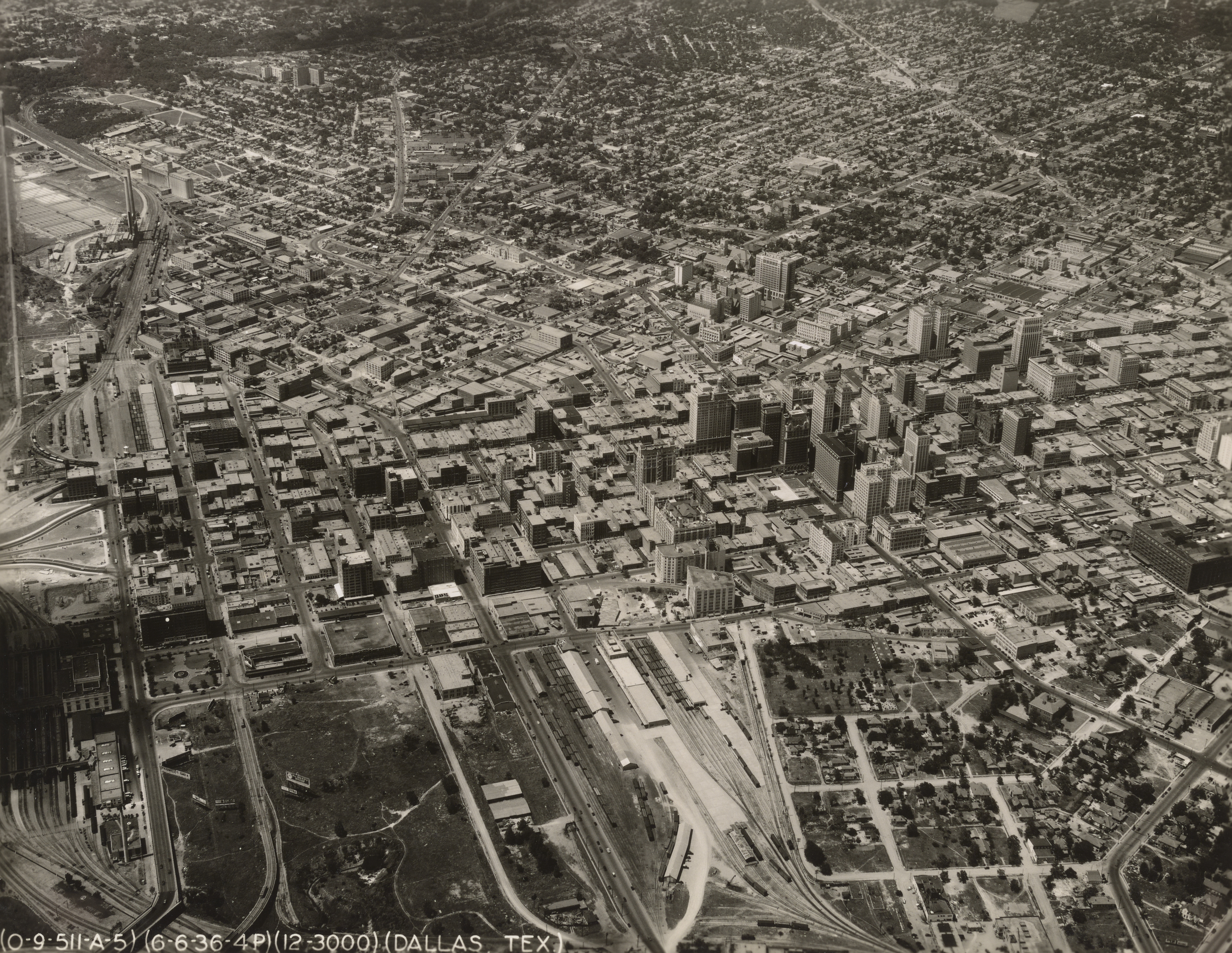
Dallas skyline in 1936

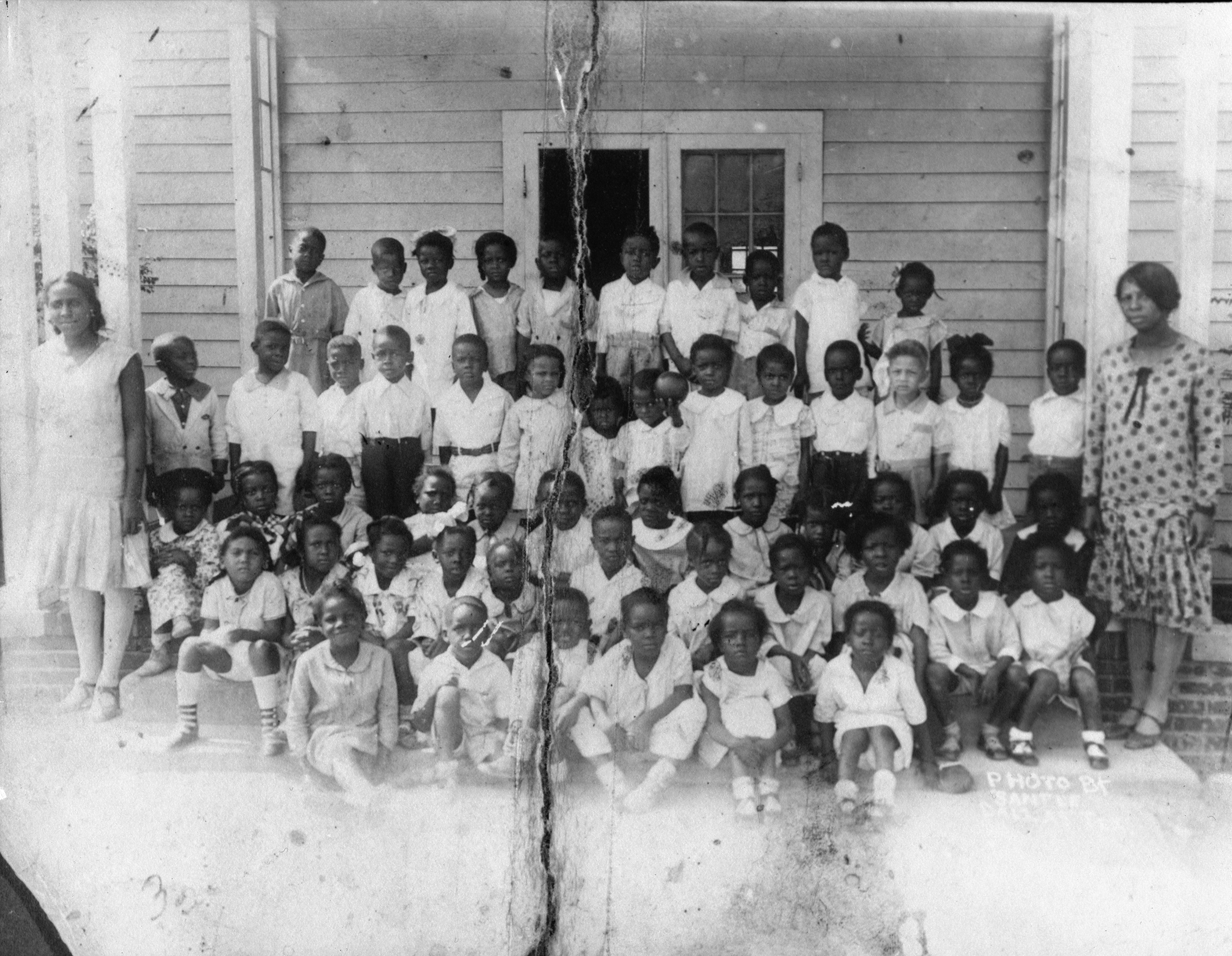
Kindergarten class in Dallas, circa 1930s

The history of Dallas, Texas, United States, from 1930 to 1945 documents the city's emergence from the Great Depression, its economic boom after several local oil discoveries, its hosting of the Texas Centennial Exposition, and its existence during wartime.

== Great Depression and oil ==
Despite the onset of the Great Depression, business in construction was flourishing in 1930. That year, Columbus Marion "Dad" Joiner struck oil 100 miles (160 km) east of Dallas in Kilgore, spawning the East Texas oil boom, part of the larger Texas Oil Boom of the early 1900s. Dallas quickly became the financial center for the oil industry in Texas and Oklahoma. In the first months of 1931, 28 petroleum-related businesses either moved to or formed in Dallas. Banks made loans to develop the oil fields, and Dallas became the financial center for all oil fields in the Texas Panhandle, the Permian Basin, East Texas, Gulf Coast, and Oklahoma. This put off most thoughts of depression until the middle of 1931, when falling prices and overproduction affected the city economy negatively. By then, more than 18,000 people in the city were unemployed. Before the New Deal policy began, the city had a work-for-food program that helped many.

== Trinity River channeling ==
By 1931, the city had not completed the rerouting of the Trinity River and the construction of an extensive levee system based on George Kessler's Kessler Plan.

== Texas Centennial Exposition ==
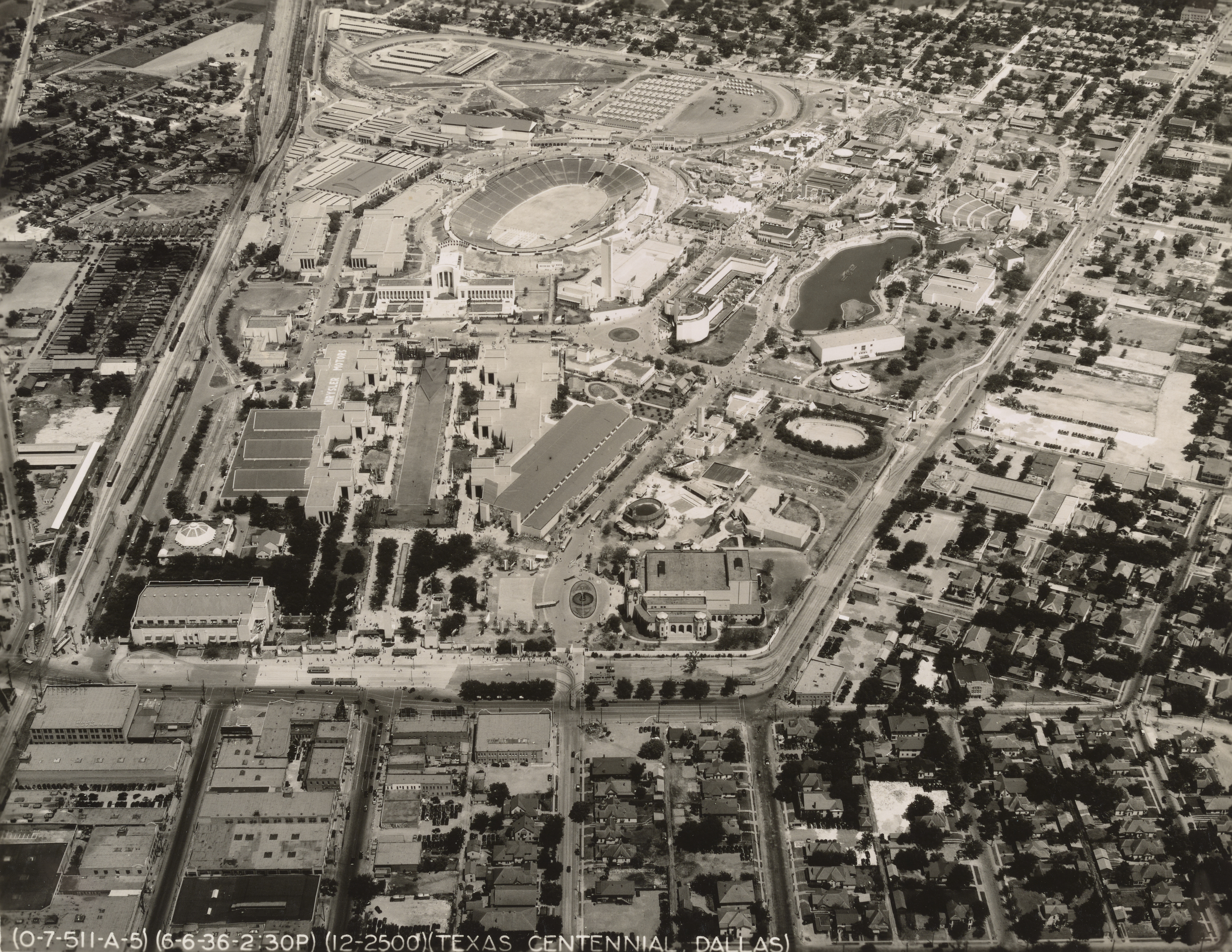
Texas Centennial Exposition

After a long campaign in the years leading up to 1936, the state of Texas chose Dallas as the site of the 1936 Texas Centennial Exposition. More than fifty buildings were built for the Exposition in Fair Park, and 10 million visitors came to see the US$25 million spectacle.

== World War II ==
During World War II, Dallas served as a manufacturing center for the war effort. By 1940, the population of the city of Dallas had reached 294,734. In 1942, the Ford Motor plant in Dallas converted to war-time production, producing only jeeps and military trucks. In 1943 the city began war rationing, with 376,085 ration books distributed. University of Texas Southwestern Medical School was also established this year.
