= Wichita Falls Railroad Museum =

Railroad museum in Texas

Coordinates: 33.9129°N 98.4882°W

The Wichita Falls Railroad Museum is a Railroad museum in Wichita Falls, Texas. It was founded in 1980 to establish a museum of railroad, streetcar, and pioneer history. Starting its existence in the town's historic Depot Square, it changed locations over time, but since 1992 has been located back in Depot Square.

Rolling stock includes the Fort Worth and Denver Railway No. 304 steam locomotive, and the Missouri–Kansas–Texas Railroad (also referred to as the 'KATY') diesel switcher No. 1029, as well as Commuter Cars, Pullman Troop Sleepers, Dining Cars, Post Office and Baggage Cars, Cabooses and more.

== History ==
It was founded in 1980 to establish a museum of railroad, streetcar, and pioneer history. Starting its existence in the town's historic Depot Square, it changed locations over time, but since 1992 has been located back in Depot Square, atop the site of the former Wichita Falls Union Station.

The museum was closed in November 2020 because of the COVID-19 pandemic. Museum officials originally agreed with the City of Wichita Falls, which owned the museum building, to terminate the lease and, by the end of 2021, ship the contents to the Museum of North Texas History, also in Wichita Falls. However, by May 2022, no final plan regarding what to do with the artifacts had been approved by the City of Wichita Falls, and the artifacts remained behind locked gates in their old location. In 2023, the museum board was granted a lease of one year after a unanimous vote with the Wichita Falls city council.

Another lease was granted to the museum in 2024. As part of a plan to revitalize the museum, special events such as staged bank robberies, shootouts, murder mysteries, and other things such as Christmas parades were proposed as a way to generate engagement with the non-profit. Progress since then has been made, such as restoration projects and fundraisers. The museum is on track to a full reopening, but is still looking for volunteers and donations to help them expedite the process. Plans to build a brick platform have also been proposed as the museum is on the former site of the Wichita Falls Union Station.

== Artifacts ==
=== Fort Worth & Denver No. 304 ===
No. 304 is a B-4-R type locomotive built in 1906 by the Brooks Locomotive Works, for the Fort Worth and Denver Railway. It was converted to burn oil in 1929, but still looks practically Identical to other B-4-R locomotives delivered to the Colorado and Southern Railway, the parent company of the Fort Worth and Denver Railway. No. 304 was donated to the Wichita Falls Rotary Club in 1955, and later donated to the Wichita Falls Railroad Museum where it remains today.

=== Missouri-Kansas-Texas Railroad No. 1029 ===
No. 1029 is an EMD NW2 type locomotive built in 1947 for the Missouri–Kansas–Texas Railroad, and saved by Steve Goen and his wife. No. 1029 was the first Diesel Switcher on the Missouri–Kansas–Texas Railroad to be assigned in Wichita Falls. No. 1029 currently lacks a drive assembly, as the Missouri–Kansas–Texas Railroad had sold the Locomotive to scrappers who had wanted the engine and traction motors. The railroad purchased No. 1029 back so the locomotive could be donated to the Wichita Falls Railroad museum, but gave the scrap merchants the engine and traction motors, leaving it a dummy unit.

== Gallery ==
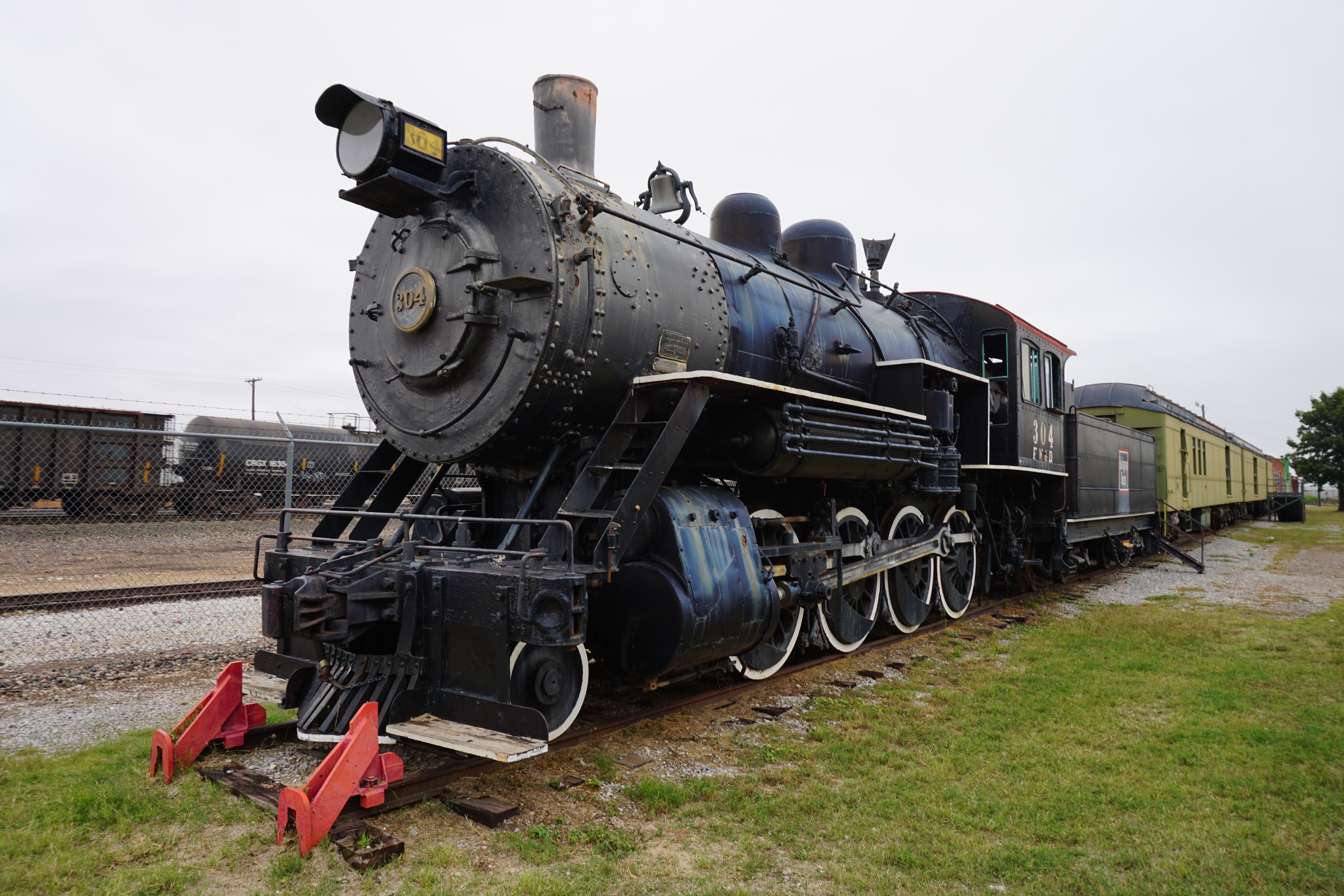
Fort Worth & Denver ALCO 2-8-0 No. 304

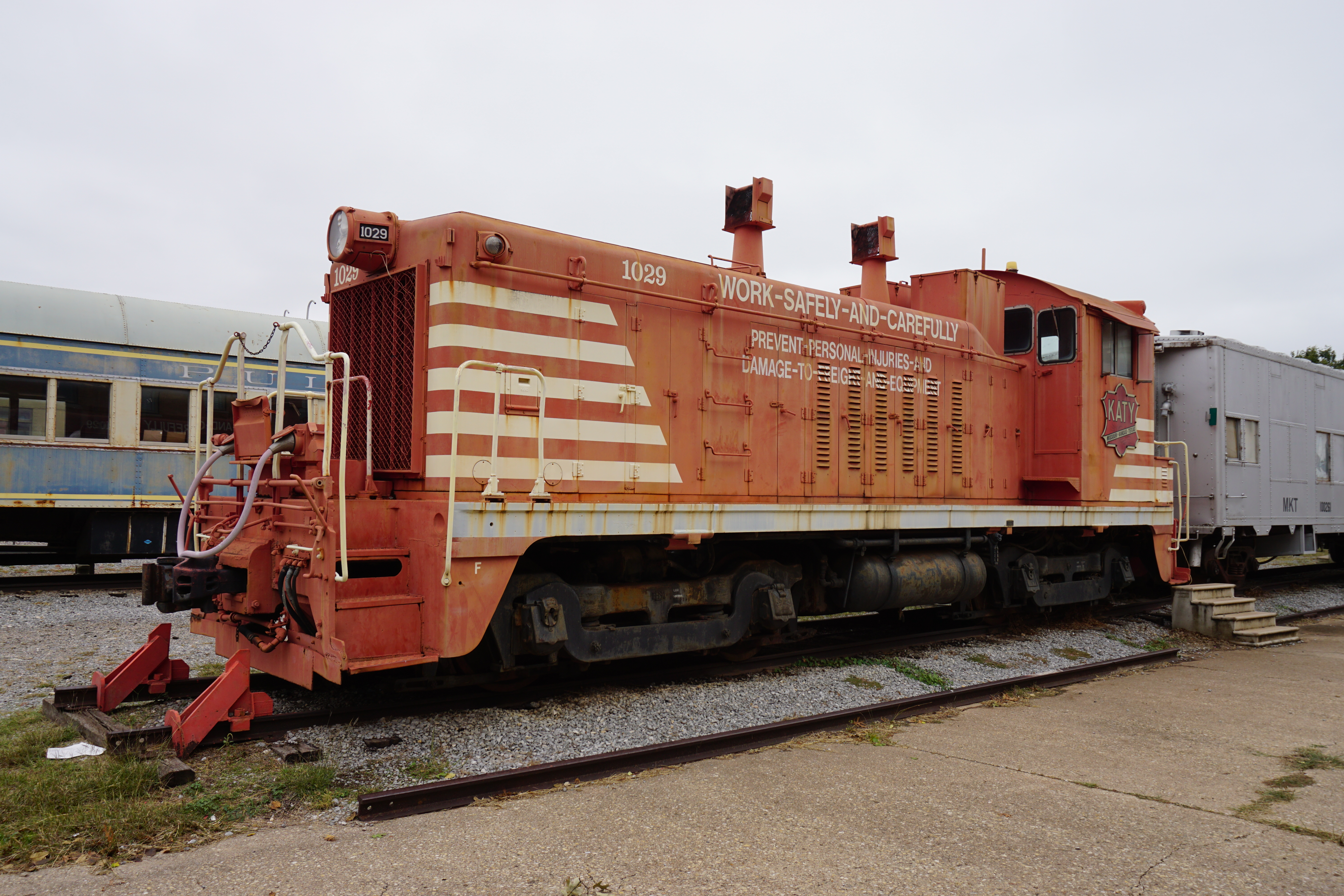
MKT EMD NW2 No. 1029

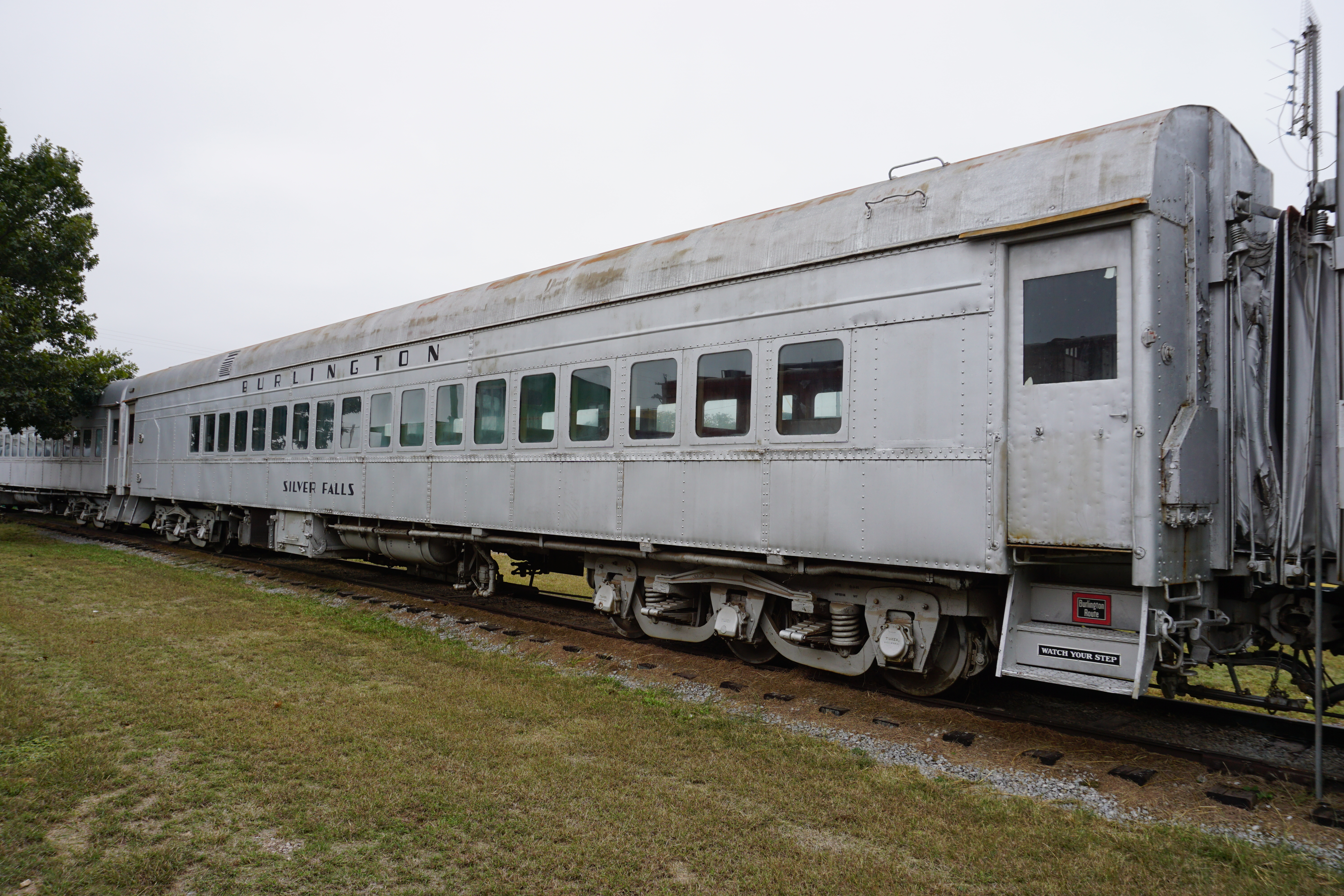
Chicago, Burlington and Quincy Railroad coach Silver Falls

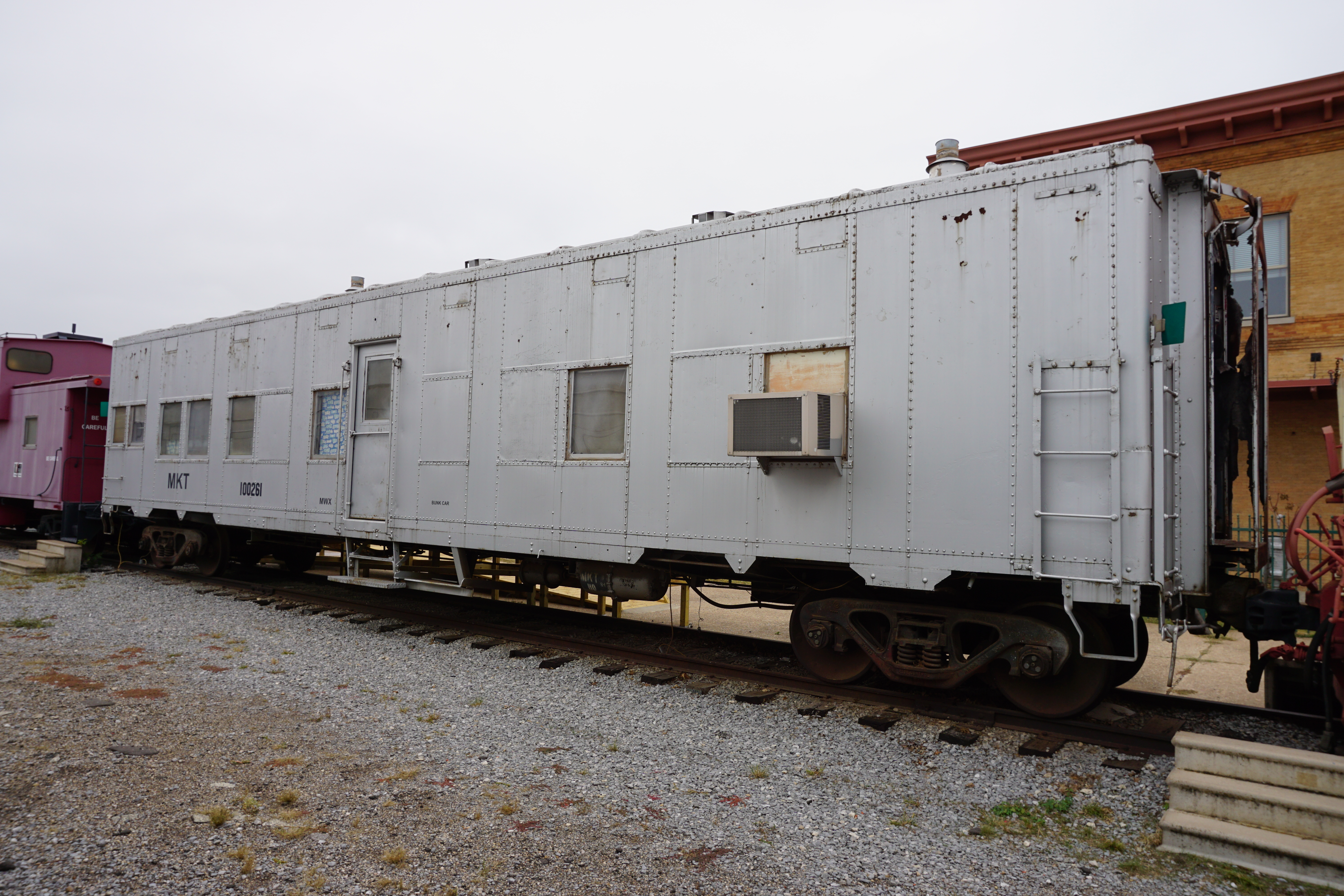
MKT troop sleeper No. 100261

== See also ==
- List of heritage railroads in the United States
