= Polly Smith (photographer) =

American photojournalist (1908–1980)

- Polly Smith in 1925
- Born: Frances Sutah Smith; December 29, 1908; Ruston, Louisiana, U.S.
- Died: June 18, 1980 (aged 71); Auburn, California, U.S.
- Known for: Photography

Signature
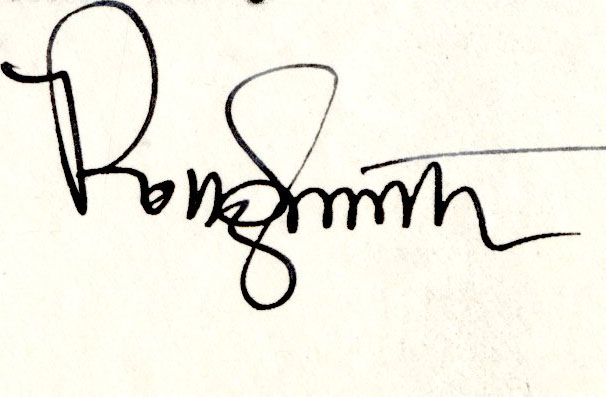

Frances Sutah "Polly" Smith (December 29, 1908 – June 18, 1980) was an American documentary and commercial photographer, best known for her images of Texas taken for the Texas Centennial Exposition in 1936. Smith's photographs are considered some of the first taken of Texas for marketing and publicity use.

== Early life ==
Polly Smith, born in Ruston, Louisiana, was the daughter of Roy Egerton Smith, a farmer and salesman, and Marion (Minnie) Burck, a former schoolteacher and United States census supervisor. Her brother, C. R. Smith, became the CEO of American Airlines. After growing up in various Texas towns, she graduated from Austin High School in 1925. For a while, she worked as a keypunch and tabulator operator for the Texas State Highway Department.

In 1933, Smith briefly attended the University of Texas at Austin to study photography with John Kuehne. She withdrew from classes early to study photography at the Clarence Hudson White School of Photography in New York City. She studied there for two years.

== Career ==
=== Texas Centennial Exposition ===
In October 1935, Smith was hired as a freelance photographer by the Texas Centennial Exposition publicity department. She travelled alone across Texas for approximately eight months and drove over 3,600 miles. Her assignment was to document Texas life in her photographs and to make an "adequate and complete file of representative Texas photos".

Using her 5X7 Home Portrait Graflex camera, she initially took photographs in Austin and East Texas, areas familiar to her. In December 1935, Smith headed to the Rio Grande Valley. During this time, she would take photographs and then develop them later, while staying in hotels throughout the state.

In February 1936, she took photographs of San Antonio. Around this time her camera was stolen. but she was able to purchase new equipment with an advance from the Centennial promotion department. She also purchased a new Ford truck and had a dark room installed on the back. This let her develop photographs on the side of the road. In March 1936, she returned to San Antonio. After that, she headed to Houston, and then Dallas. Her final stops were at Alpine and Fort Davis, Texas.

On July 6, 1936, Smith's contract ended due to the opening of the Texas Centennial Exposition. During this time, she did freelance photography work for Chrysler, which was an exhibitor at the Centennial.

Smith's Texas Centennial photographs were widely published, in both trade and commercial magazines. Some of these include Architectural Forum, Farm Implement News, Furniture Age, House Beautiful, Peanut Journal & Nut World, Pictorial Review, and Texas Parade. Additionally, several Dallas businesses, such as Neiman Marcus and the Adolphus Hotel, displayed her work before and during the Centennial.

=== Other work ===
After her work for the Texas Centennial Exposition, she did freelance work. From 1939 to 1942, she did publicity for the Dallas Aviation School. She also worked for Delta Air Lines, Falstaff Brewing, and the Matador Ranch. In the spring of 1945, Smith moved to New York City and worked for American Airlines.

During World War II, she formed the volunteer group, The Liberty Belles, with several friends in Dallas, Texas. The group raised money for troops by selling war bonds, stamps, and working extra jobs.

In Spring 1948, she moved back to Austin to attend the University of Texas. She studied painting and sculpture.

== Later years ==
Smith moved to California in the late 1960s to live with her sister. During this time, she battled breast cancer. She continued to work on her painting and sculptures until her death from cancer. She died in Auburn, California, on June 18, 1980.

== Legacy ==
In December 1938, Texas Parade, called Smith "one of Texas' finest artists with a camera. . . . Miss Smith uses a vivid imagination that gives her photographs a unique distinction in the pictorial arts". Her work has been called "remarkable for unique blend of the realistic and artistic".

Today, some of her photos are permanently mounted in East Texas and North Texas rooms in the Hall of State at Fair Park in Dallas, Texas.
