= Museum of North Texas History =

History museum in Texas, US

Coordinates: 33.9129°N 98.4882°W

The Museum of North Texas History in Wichita Falls, Texas depicts the history of the area with exhibits, pictures, clothing and artifacts, striving to show the rich heritage of North Texas. Permanent exhibits include the Bill English Military Collection, the Heritage Hall which is home to an amazing collection of western hats known as "Nat's Hats", old Medical equipment, the Mary Thomas Doll & Toy Collection, and, at the Wichita Falls Regional Airport, the Jenny to Jets Exhibit which runs from an old Jenny biplane to a modern T-38 jet trainer of Sheppard Air Force Base.

With the closure of the Wichita Falls Railroad Museum across town in March 2020 because of the COVID-19 pandemic, the Museum of North Texas History agreed to take responsibility for that collection. The Museum inventoried the collection in place, and expected to finish by the end of 2021. By May 2022, no proposal regarding what to do with the artifacts had been approved by the City of Wichita Falls, and the artifacts remained behind locked gates in their old location.

Admission is $5.00 for Visitors 14+, $2.00 for Children 6 & up, 5 & under are free.
