= The American Museum of the Miniature Arts =

Museum in Dallas, Texas, USA

Coordinates: 32.7845°N 96.8082°W

The American Museum of the Miniature Arts was a non-profit museum in Dallas, Texas (USA) that focused on miniature art. Much of the museum's collection was previously on display in the Sharp Gallery at the Hall of State at Fair Park.
