= Hall of State =

Historic building in Dallas, Texas, USA

- U.S. Historic district – Contributing property
- Texas State Antiquities Landmark
- Recorded Texas Historic Landmark
- Dallas Landmark Historic District; Contributing Property
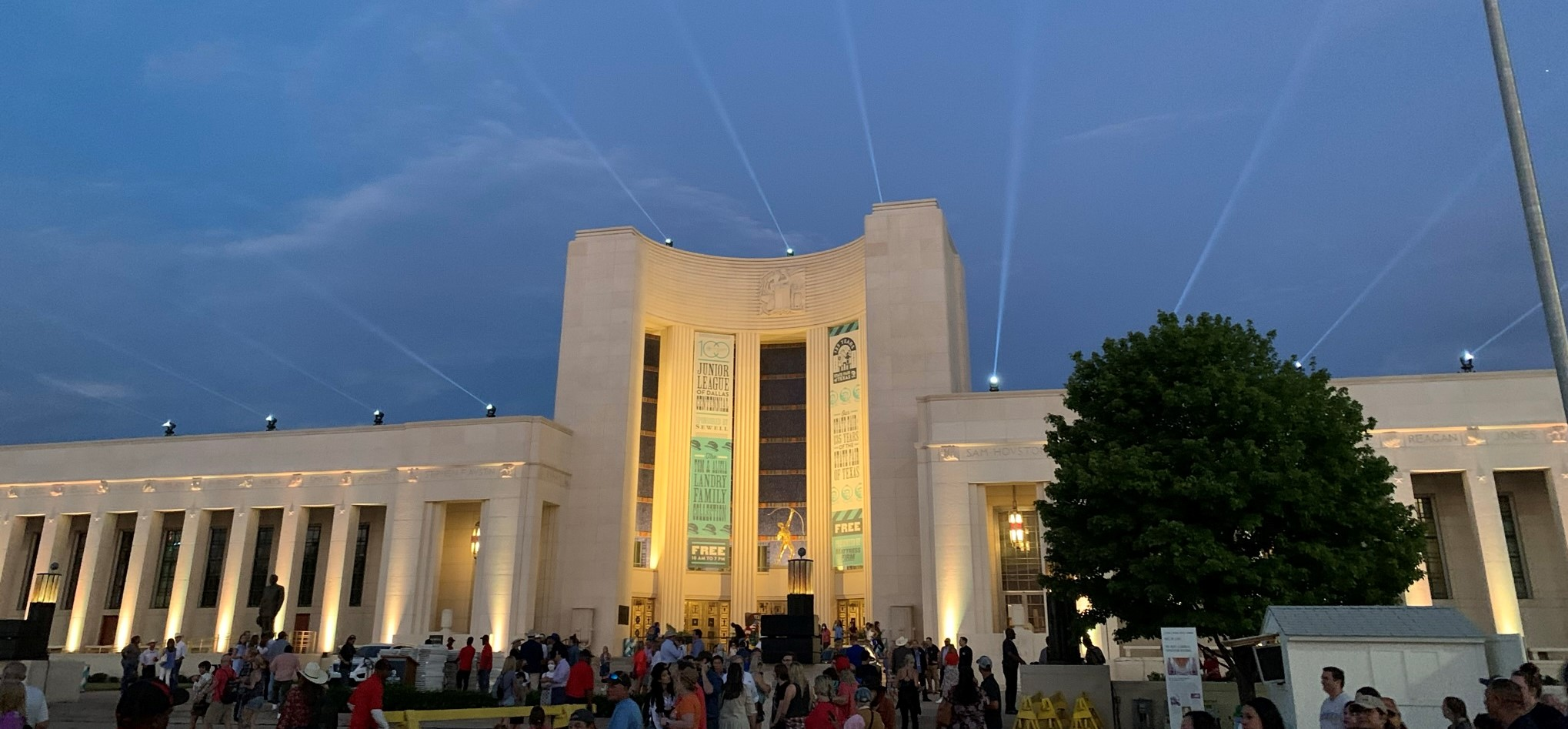
- Exterior of the Hall of State

- Location within Texas Location within the United States
- Location: 3939 Grand Ave., Dallas, Texas
- Coordinates: 32°46′51″N 96°45′40″W
- Built: 1936
- Architect: Donald Barthelme, Adams & Adams, et al
- Architectural style: Art Deco
- Part of: Texas Centennial Exposition Buildings (1936-1937) (ID86003488)
- TSAL No.: 8200000213
- RTHL No.: 6732
- DLMKHD No.: H/33 (Fair Park)

Significant dates
- Designated CP: September 24, 1986
- Designated TSAL: January 1, 1984
- Designated RTHL: 1981
- Designated DLMKHD: March 4, 1987

The Hall of State (originally the State of Texas Building) is a building in Dallas's Fair Park that commemorates the history of the U.S. state of Texas and is considered one of the best examples of Art Deco architecture in the state. It was designed and built for the Texas Centennial Exposition.

== Site ==
The Hall of State is located at Fair Park, an 80-acre fairground in East Dallas. It is located at the west end of the 1,500-foot (460 m) long Esplanade of State which is flanked by six exhibition pavilions and features a long reflecting pool.

The Dallas State Fair (later the State Fair of Texas) has been held at Fair Park since 1886.

City leaders, such as R. L. Thornton, Fred Florence, and George Waverley Briggs, wanted Dallas to be chosen as the host city for the Texas Centennial Exposition. They worked on building public support and hired architect, George Dahl, to draw up preliminary plans. Dallas was chosen as the host city in September 1934. City officials offered the land at Fair Park and promised $8 million would go towards the Centennial, even if they did not get any state or federal funds.

In spring 1935, Texas House Bill 11 passed, which allocated $1,000,000 towards buildings for the Texas Centennial Exposition on the State Fair of Texas fairgrounds plus $200,000 to "equip and furnish the structure."

== Design and architecture ==
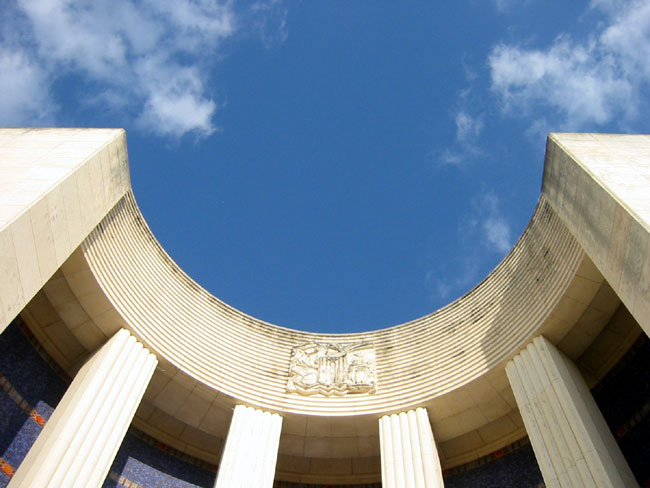
The curved exedra at the entrance of the Hall of State

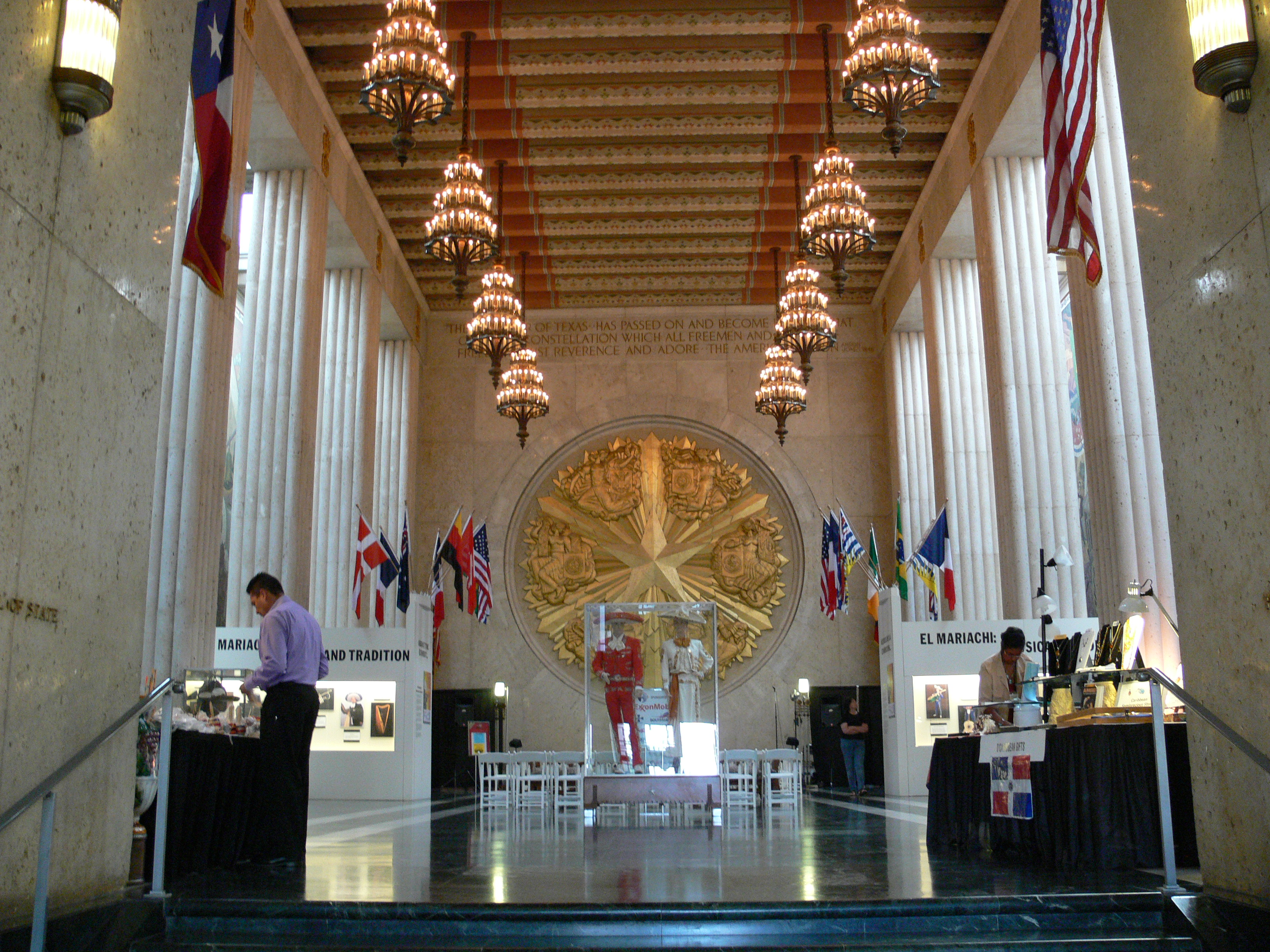
Interior Great Hall

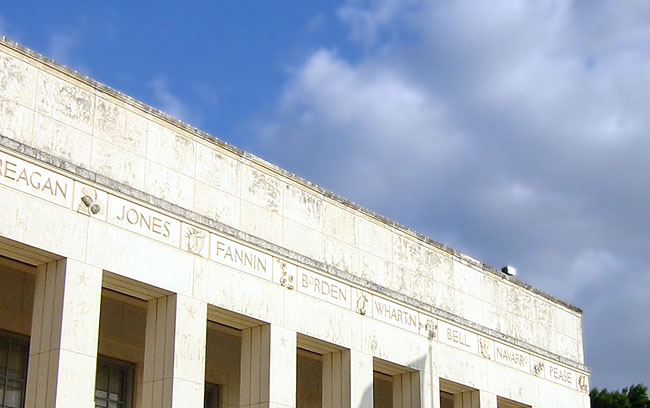
The exterior frieze of the Hall of State honors 59 Texas historical figures. Displayed here are John Reagan, Anson Jones, James Fannin, Gail Borden, William H. Wharton, Peter Bell, Jose Navarro and Elisha M. Pease.

=== Architects ===
In September 1934, when Dallas submitted its bid to become the host city for the Centennial Exposition, George Dahl’s conceptual sketches for the State of Texas building were presented to the Texas Centennial Commission. This version included a cylindrical tower with a gold star on top in the center of the building with pavilions on each side. By June 1935, these plans, minus the tower, were published in the Dallas Morning News. Dahl’s design was approved by the Exposition Commission and the Texas Centennial Commission.

Around June 20, the Centennial Board of Control, a group established by the Texas Legislature to oversee and disburse money set aside for the Centennial, contracted the Texas Centennial Architects, Associated to design the building. This group included ten prominent Dallas architects, such as Mark Lemmon, Hal Thomson, Roscoe DeWitt, Marion Foosher, Anton Korn, Ralph Bryan, Walter Sharp, and Arthur Thomas. On June 24 and 29, 1935, this group presented their designs for the State of Texas building.

These new designs attempted to bring the building’s costs down to the amount set by the Texas Legislature ($1 million). By July 3, 1935, none of these designs had been approved.

The next day, Mark Lemmon offered Donald Barthelme the position of chief designer for the State of Texas building. By July 9, Barthelme presented his designs, which were approved by the State Board of Control in Austin. The final revisions to his design was approved on July 20, 1935. All three entities involved—the Texas Centennial Central Exposition Corporation, the Texas Centennial Commission, and the Centennial Board of Control—approved his design.

=== Construction ===
The formal groundbreaking ceremony for the Hall of State was on October 12, 1935. The original building plans included two additional rooms, the Hall of 1836 and the Hall of 1936. To keep costs down, they were not built, although their foundations were poured. By February 1936, the building's steel framework was up, but only the exterior of the building was ready when the Centennial opened on June 6, 1936. The building was officially dedicated as the State of Texas building on September 6, 1936. The building's cost totalled $1.2 million.

=== Exterior ===
==== Grounds ====
The grassy area around the building contains several sculptures:

- "R. L. Thornton" statue (1969) by Waldine Tauch.
- "Little Lady Liberty," donated to Fair Park by the Boy Scouts of America in the 1950s.
- "Berlin Bear/Berliner Bar" (1970) by Hildebert Kliem.

==== Portico Tejas ====
The curved exedra at the entrance to the Hall of Texas features 76-foot (23 m) tall limestone pillars sit in front of blue tiles designed to evoke the state's flower, the bluebonnet (Lupinus texensis). In the center, above the entrance is an 11-foot (3.4 m) bronze with gold leaf statue called the "Tejas Warrior" by Allie Tennant. The archer holds high a bow without an arrow, meant to symbolize peace.

The archer statue points to the symbolic seal of Texas designed by Donald Barthelme and carved by Harry Lee Gibson. This carving depicts the Lady of Texas holding a shield with the Texas flag on it and a torch. To her right is an owl, a key, and pecan leaves. Gibson also carved the century plant fountains outside of the building and shapes of domestic animals such as steer, pronghorn antelope, mountain lion, bighorn sheep, and bison over the balcony doors.

The bronze front doors were designed by Donald Barthelme and include figures representing industry and agriculture in Texas: lariats, cattle, cow ponies, wheat sheaves, cotton bolls, saw blades, pinecones, oil rigs, and gushing oil.

==== Frieze ====
The names of the following 60 prominent historical figures in Texas' history are on the exterior frieze of the Hall of State:

Edward Burleson	Branch Tanner Archer	Thomas Jefferson Rusk	William B. Travis
James Stephen Hogg	Richard Ellis	Mirabeau B. Lamar	Ben Milam
David G. Burnet	John Coffee "Jack" Hays	James Smith (Texas General)	Albert Sidney Johnston
Stephen F. Austin	James Bonham	Davy Crockett	Sam Houston
J. Pinckney Henderson	Oran M. Roberts	Lorenzo de Zavala	James Bowie
John Reagan	Anson Jones	James Fannin	Gail Borden
William H. Wharton	Peter Bell	José Antonio Navarro	Elisha M. Pease
Samuel May Williams	Ben McCulloch	James W. Robinson	Matthew Caldwell
James Collinsworth	John Hemphill	George Childress	Thomas Green
R.T. Wheeler	William B. Franklin	Henry Wax Karnes	Moseley Baker
Walter P. Lane	Patrick Churchill Jack	Francisco Vásquez de Coronado	Alonso Alvarez de Pineda
Alonso de León	Alvar Nuñez Cabeza de Vaca	Hamilton Prieleaux Bee	William Read Scurry
Memucan Hunt Jr	Frank Johnson	Samuel Price Carson	Sidney Sherman
Abner Smith Lipscomb	George Washington Hockley	Henry Weidner Baylor	Robert McAlpin Williamson
William Menefee or John Menefee	Thomas Jefferson Chambers	Isaac Van Zandt	Thomas S. Lubbock

The front frieze is designed so that if you look at the first letters, architect's name is spelled out (Barthelme).

=== Interior ===
The building is designed in the shape of a T, and has four interior rooms representing regions found in Texas: West, East, North and South. Each room includes artwork representative of the region. The bottom floor includes an auditorium, offices, and archives.

Hall of Heroes

The main, semi-circular entry area inside the Hall of State is called the Hall of Heroes. This area features six bronze statues of James Fannin, Mirabeau B. Lamar, Stephen F. Austin, Sam Houston, Thomas Jefferson Rusk and William B. Travis sculpted by Pompeo Coppini. The statue subjects were chosen by historians and the Centennial Commission to represent key figures in Texas history. A bust of Chester Nimitz sculpted by Felix de Weldon was added in 1964 as part of a planned expansion to the Hall of Heroes. Carvings near the top of the walls in this area list locations important to Texas' fight for independence.

This area also contains bronze plaques that commemorate the Battle of the Alamo and the Battle of San Jacinto.

East Texas Room

The design of this room focuses on the East Texas region. The wood panelling is made from the East Texas gum tree. Orotones by Polly Smith capture scenes from this region, including cotton and oil field workers, and farm life. Two paintings by Olin Travis are in this room. The first, called "Pre-Oil Texas," depicts cotton ginning and lumber manufacturing. At the bottom of the painting, symbolic characters that Travis called "Sleeping Giants" hide in the soil. The other painting, called "Post-Oil Texas," shows an oil derrick with the "Sleeping Giants" coming up through it. Oil refineries and skyscrapers are in the background.

West Texas Room

This room decor draws inspiration from West Texas region. The walls are covered in adobe-like plaster with cattle ranch brand designs imprinted in them.The window treatments are made of lariats, horseshoes, and horsetails. The tile designs on the walls were created by Ethel Wilson Harris and the Mexican Arts and Crafts Workshop in San Antonio, Texas. The eight panels depict people in a West Texas town such as a sheriff, horse wrangler, sheep herder, and prospector.

The cowboy statue in the rear of the room was sculpted by Dorothy Austin Webberley out of white pine The wall behind the statue is covered in cowhides laced with rawhide strips. The two paintings in this room are by Tom Lea. The first painting is called "Frontier Family," and depicts a man, woman, and child sitting in a wagon with a town in the background. The second, "Cowboy," shows a ranch scene with a cowboy in the foreground.

The West Texas room is currently the G. B. Dealey Library.

==== The Great Hall ====
This main room in the building is forty-six feet high, ninety-four feet long, and sixty-eight feet wide. The columns are reeded Cordova Cream shell stone, a quarried Texas limestone.

==== North Texas Room ====
This room includes wood carvings depicting wheat and cotton by Lynn Ford over the doors and eight photographs by Polly Smith. The only fresco in this building is in this room. It is entitled "Old Man Texas" and was painted by Arthur Starr Niendorff, who worked with Diego Rivera. Old Man Texas was a cartoon character created by John Knott for the Dallas Morning News in the early 20th century.

==== South Texas Room ====
The walls of this room are covered in aluminum leaf with black Pyrenees marble wainscotting. The artwork in this room includes wood carvings by Lynn Ford depicting history and romance and eight shields designed by James Owen Mahoney, Jr. The mural in this room, entitled "Allegorical View of South Texas" was also painted by Mahoney.

== Reception and impact ==
The State of Texas building was called a “permanent memorial to Texas patriots”.

== Landmark status ==
The building became a Recorded Texas Historic Landmark in 1981.

== Current use ==
The Dallas Historical Society has been responsible for managing the Hall of State since 1938. The Hall of State is listed on the National Register of Historic Places as a part of Fair Park. In 1986, the building was restored at a cost of approximately $1.5 million, and the G.B. Dealey Library was opened.

The G.B. Dealey Library, located in the West Texas room of the Hall of State, holds more than ten thousand bound volumes and three million historic documents, including Sam Houston's handwritten account of the battle of San Jacinto.

The Dallas Historical Society rents the Hall of State for events and provides guided tours to school groups.

The American Museum of the Miniature Arts was previously located at the Hall of State.

== See also ==
- National Register of Historic Places listings in Dallas County, Texas
- Recorded Texas Historic Landmarks in Dallas County
- List of Dallas Landmarks
