= Bradfield Elementary School =

Public primary school in Texas, United States

Coordinates: 32.8364°N 96.8079°W

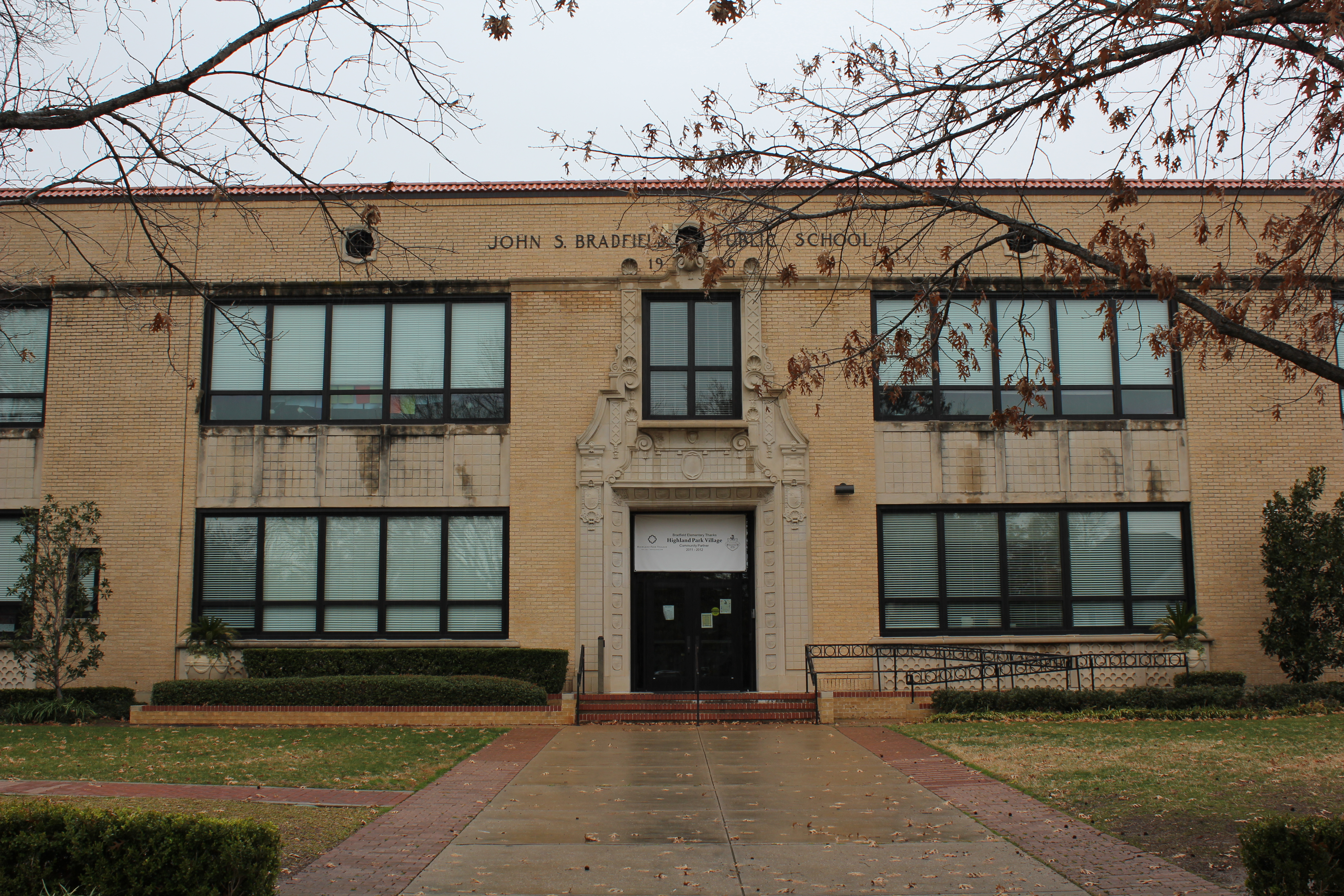
- Highland Park, Texas; United States

Information
- Type: Public primary school

John Sherman Bradfield Elementary School is a public primary school located at 4300 Southern Avenue, Highland Park, Texas, United States. The school, a part of the Highland Park Independent School District, serves pre-K through fourth grade. The school serves sections of Highland Park and University Park.

== History ==
The school was the site of a fatal airplane crash on September 27, 1967. An Aero Commander 560E, registration number N3831C, was on approach to Dallas Love Field when its left wing broke in half, sending the plane plummeting into the middle of adjacent Mockingbird Lane. Flaming wreckage tore through the school playground and narrowly missed the school building. The crash occurred during normal school hours, but the students had been sent home early so that teachers could hold a meeting; a lone boy was reportedly playing in the playground at the time, but he saw the approaching airplane in time to run to safety, and some boys playing football nearby were far enough from the crash site to avoid serious harm. The aircraft, owned by Ling-Temco-Vought, was occupied by a professional pilot and six US military servicemen being ferried to Love Field; all seven were killed. An investigation attributed the crash to metal fatigue in the plane's wing.

For the 1989–1990 and 2005 school years Bradfield was named a National Blue Ribbon School.
