= Scotland Yard (disambiguation) =

Scotland Yard is the headquarters of the Greater London Metropolitan Police.

Scotland Yard may also refer to:

== Places ==
- Great Scotland Yard, the street where the original London Metropolitan Police headquarters was located in the mid-19th century
- Norman Shaw Buildings, the original New Scotland Yard (1890–1967)
- New Scotland Yard (building), in Westminster, London
- Scotland Yard (Highland Park), a baseball park in Texas

== Art, entertainment and media ==
- Scotland Yard, a 1929 play by Denison Clift
  - Scotland Yard (1930 film), starring Joan Bennett, based on the play
  - Scotland Yard (1941 film), an American crime drama based on the play
- Scotland Yard (film series), a series of British cinema film shorts (1953–1961)
- Scotland Yard (TV series), a 1960 British crime series
- Scotland Yard (board game), 1983
- "Scotland Yard", a John Cale song from Shifty Adventures in Nookie Wood
- New Scotland Yard (TV series), a 1972–1974 British crime series

== Other uses ==
- Scotland Yard, a metonym for the Greater London Metropolitan Police
