= Park Cities, Texas =

Two communities in Dallas County, Texas

Park Cities is a term used in reference to two communities in Dallas County, Texas – the Town of Highland Park and the City of University Park. The two municipalities, which share a border, are surrounded by the city of Dallas and comprise an enclave.

As of the 2010 census, the Park Cities had a population of 31,632.

The Park Cities have among the highest per capita incomes in the Dallas–Fort Worth metroplex and Texas.

In 2000, the Robb Report presented a report which stated that the Park Cities ranked No. 9 in a list of communities with the highest quality living in the USA.

== Demographics ==
- Total Population: 31,632
- Total Households: 11,590
- Total Families: 7,703
- Racial makeup:
  - 95.14% White
  - 3.00% Hispanic or Latino of any race
  - 1.84% Asian
  - 1.14% African American
  - 0.89% from other races
  - 0.77 from two or more races
  - 0.20% Native American
  - 0.02% Pacific Islander
- Per Capita Income: $80,211
- Median Household Income: $121,084
- Median Income (Males): In excess of $100,000
- Median Income (Females): $43,801

In terms of formal education, the Park Cities rank as Texas' first and second most educated communities. 82.8% of adults in University Park age 25 years or older possess an associate degree or higher, and 80.5% obtained a baccalaureate degree or higher. 76.6% of adults in Highland Park age 25 years or older possess an associate degree or higher, and 74.7% obtained a baccalaureate degree or higher.

== Culture ==
In 1982, the Park Cities Historical Society, which is intended to preserve the community, was founded.

== Education ==
The Highland Park Independent School District serves most of the Park Cities. A small portion of Highland Park (areas west of Roland Avenue) is zoned to the Dallas Independent School District.

University Park is home to Southern Methodist University.

=== Schools ===
- Boone Elementary
- Armstrong Elementary
- McCulloch Intermediate and Highland Park Middle School
- University Park Elementary
- Hyer Elementary
- Bradfield Elementary
- Highland Park High School

== Media ==
- The Dallas Morning News is the Dallas citywide newspaper.
- Park Cities News is the official community newspaper since 1938.
