= Highland Park High School (University Park, Texas) =

Public, co-educational high school in Dallas County, Texas, United States

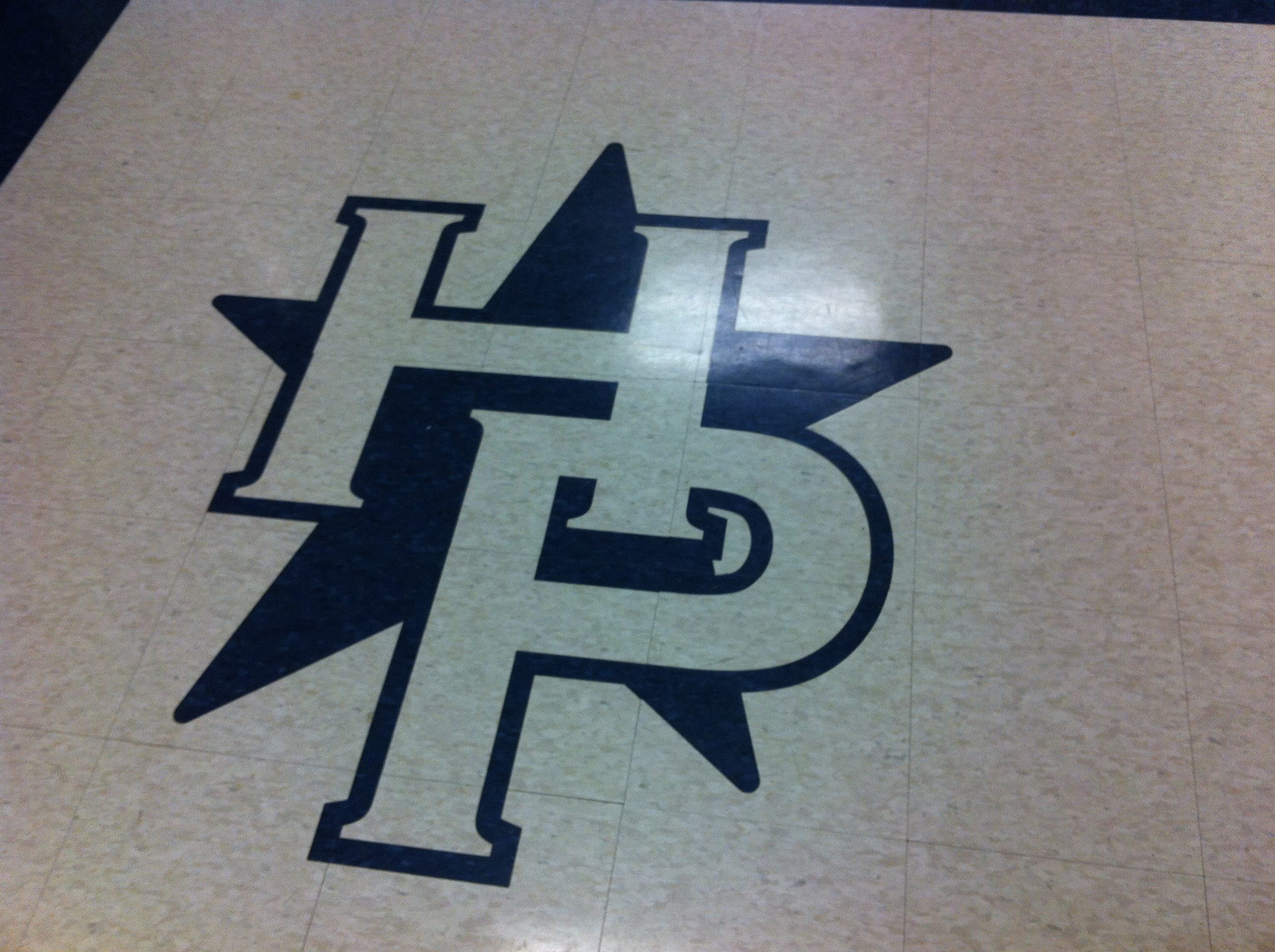

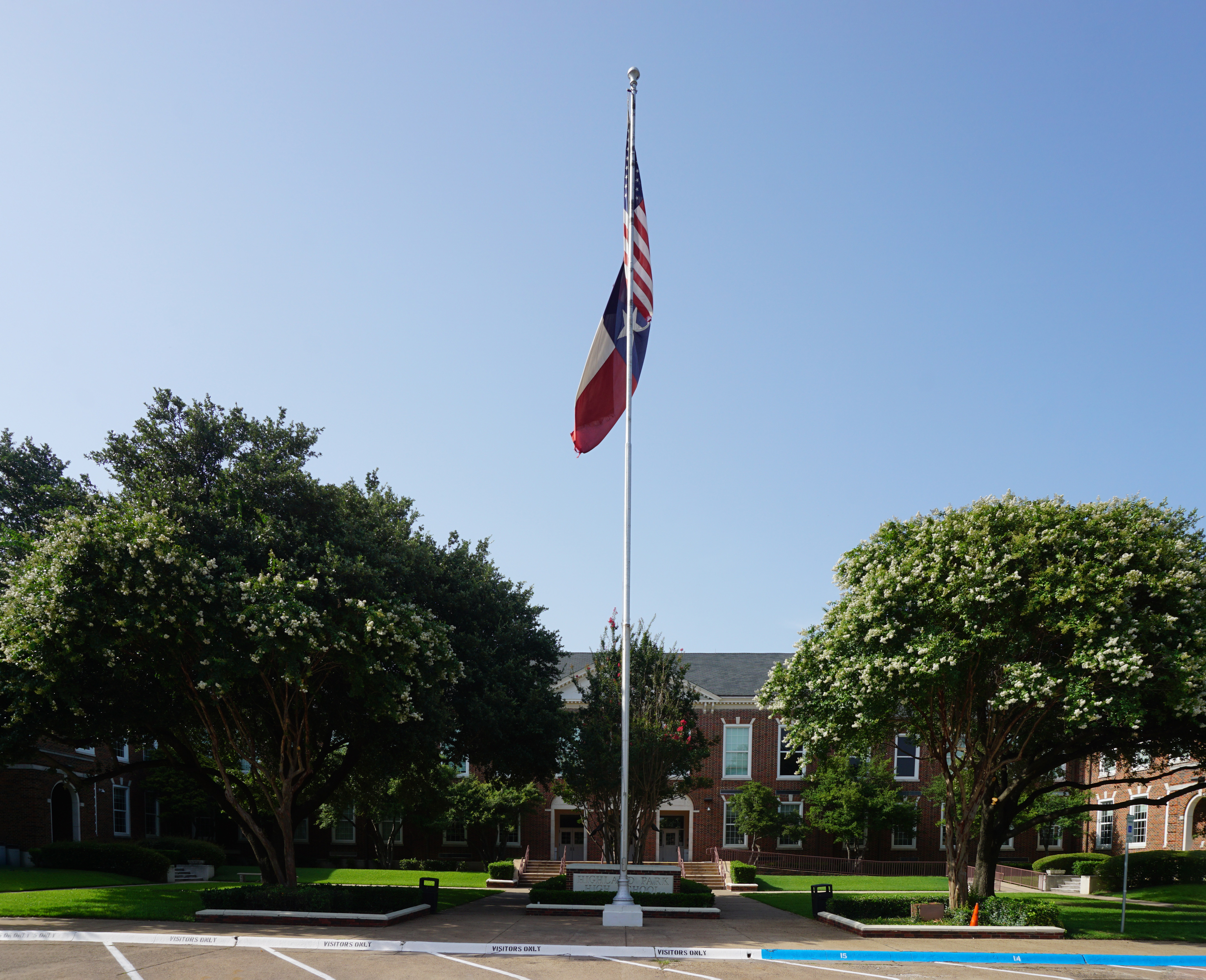

Location
- 4220 Emerson Avenue; Dallas, (Dallas County), TX 75205; United States; 32.84735°N 96.80761°W

Information
- School type: Public high school
- Motto: Enter to Learn, Go Forth to Serve
- Established: 1922
- Status: Currently operational
- School board: Highland Park ISD Board of Trustees
- School district: Highland Park Independent School District
- NCES District ID: 4210920
- Superintendent: Mike Rockwood
- School code: TX-057911-057911001
- CEEB code: 441740
- NCES School ID: 482325002357
- Staff: 144.24 (on an FTE basis)
- Grades: 9–12
- Gender: Coeducational
- Enrollment: 2,177 (2023-2024)
  - Grade 9: 514
  - Grade 10: 536
  - Grade 11: 564
  - Grade 12: 563
- Student to teacher ratio: 15.09
- Campus type: Suburb: Large
- Colors: Gold; Dark Blue
- Athletics: Yes
- Athletics conference: UIL Division I Region 2 District 6-5A
- Nickname: Scots
- USNWR ranking: 281
- Newspaper: The Bagpipe
- Yearbook: The Highlander
- Budget: $216 million (2023-2024)
- Communities served: University Park
- Feeder schools: Highland Park Middle School
- Band: Highlander Band
- Drill Team: Highland Belles
- Website: hs.hpisd.org

Highland Park High School (often shortened HPHS or HP) is a public, co-educational high school immediately north of downtown Dallas in University Park, Texas. It is a part of the Highland Park Independent School District, which serves approximately 32,200 residents who are predominantly college-educated professionals and business leaders. It serves all of University Park, most of the town of Highland Park, and portions of Dallas.

As of the 2023-2024 school year, the school had an enrollment of 2,177 students and 144.6 classroom teachers (on an FTE basis), for a student–teacher ratio of 15.6:1. There were four students (0.2% of enrollment) eligible for free lunch and none eligible for reduced-cost lunch. Its CEEB code is 441740. The campus code for TEA reporting purposes is 057911001 (based on the HPISD code of 057911).

== History ==
A yellow brick schoolhouse, the Armstrong School, opened on October 12, 1915. It served children only through ninth grade. In 1922, the school moved to Normandy Avenue after HPISD purchased 11 lots in 1920. Tenth grade was added in 1922, and 11th grade in 1923. In 1924, 34 students became the first graduating class of the Highland Park Independent School District when they participated in HPISD's first high school graduation ceremony on June 2, 1924 (at that time, only 11 years of school were required before college; 12th grade was added in 1937). The school's yearbook for that year, the 1924 Highlander, had a paragraph reading:

Many schools live merely on the momentum and traditions they have gathered in the more flourishing days of past. We are proud of our short past, but we are prouder of the Highland Park High School that is to be.

This first location (at the corner of Normandy Avenue and High School Avenue) later became the district's middle school in 1937 when the current Highland Park High School building was erected on Emerson Avenue. The old building became Highland Park Junior High School, later renamed Arch H. McCulloch Middle School. The school added the fifth grade and split into Highland Park Middle School for grades 7 and 8 and Arch H. McCulloch Intermediate School for grades 5 and 6 upon moving to a new facility; the old building was demolished. The street adjacent to the current middle school is named High School Avenue to this day.

Eugene Lawler was the first principal. The complete list of principals through the present day is as follows:

Principals of Highland Park High School
Years active	Name
1923–28	Eugene Lawler
1928–63	Ben Wiseman
1963–66	C. D. Bowlby
1966–73	Everett Hart
1973–82	E. A. Sigler
1982–86	Tom Munroe
1986–90	Jim Gibson
1990–94	Don O'Quinn
1994–95	Linda Springer
1995–98	Jean Rutherford
1998–2000	Robert Albano
2000–02	Robert Jolly (interim)
2002–10	Patrick Cates
2010–20	Walter Kelly
2020–2024	Jeremy Gilbert
2024–Current	Kevin Hunt

Wiseman Sr. was principal for 34 years, retiring in 1962. He was a decorated Captain in the United States Army and served in combat during World War II. Wiseman was featured in Look Magazine's May 1960 edition. He is credited for developing the first language laboratory in a U.S. public school. Convinced that students learned quickly by ear, he solicited funds from several prominent Highland Park business owners to provide the reel-to-reel tape recorders needed to record and replay the daily lesson plan. He then created a language lab. Wiseman had the first remedial reading classes in a U.S. public school for the condition known today as dyslexia. He tutored his grandson.

In 1987, the HPISD school board voted not to petition the University Interscholastic League (UIL) to keep Highland Park High School in athletic class 5A; the UIL had the power to demote Highland Park High School to athletic class 4A as part of its biannual reclassification. Since then, a joke told around the UIL's biannual reclassification is that the cutoff for Class 4A is "Highland Park plus two", though, in practice, the school's enrollment has been well below the normal cutoff. In the 2014 reclassifications, the school moved up to 6A (a new classification the UIL added as part of a larger reclassification). In the 2016 reclassifications, the school moved down to 5A. In the 2022 reclassifications the school returned to the 6A division, but after the 2024 reclassifications it is now back in 5A. The average class size is 30 students per teacher, with about 550 students per grade.

In 2003, a four-year remodeling of the school was completed that added a new wing to provide more classroom space and allow for a new, larger cafeteria. In 2015, a $361.4 million bond package passed HPISD board approval and citizens' vote that allowed for new parking spaces and renovations to the attached tennis center and natatorium—eventually eliminating the natatorium and replacing it with classrooms.

Highland Park High School is the only high school in the Highland Park Independent School District. Other schools in the district include University Park Elementary, Robert S. Hyer Elementary, John S. Armstrong Elementary, John S. Bradfield Elementary, and Michael M. Boone Elementary. These five schools feed into Arch H. McCulloch Intermediate School and Highland Park Middle School, both of which are in the same building.

=== Recent events ===
In 1999, Dallas police issued 200 alcohol and curfew violation citations to Park Cities teens partying in a Deep Ellum warehouse. CNN picked up the story, and after it emerged that parents had rented the facility and contracted a bus company to deliver students to and from the party safely, the Alliance on Underage Drinking (ALOUD) started the "Parents Who Host, Lose the Most" campaign, which informs parents about health, safety and legal ramifications of serving alcohol to underage people.

In 2004, Simon & Schuster published Francine Pascal's The Ruling Class, a teen drama set at Highland Park High School. The school's newspaper, The Bagpipe, published community reactions to the book.

In 2005, The Dallas Morning News published a story about the Friday of Highland Park's homecoming spirit week, on which several seniors dressed as thugs, Mexicans, maids, and other caricatures of racial minorities. Some pointed to this as support for the general perception of HPHS and the Park Cities as a "bubble" (as the area is known in the Dallas-Fort Worth Metroplex). The article ignited a storm of letter-writing and editorializing to and in the Morning News. Soon after it was published, two swastikas were spray-painted on a sign in front of the school.

In 2005 and 2006, Highland Park students received a multitude of state and national awards and set several new records in Texas. The UIL Science Team, under the leadership of AP Chemistry teacher Wenzen Chuang, won state for the second time in school history. In 2005, The Bagpipe received the Gold Crown Award for excellence in journalism. Later that year, HPHS was one of 15 high schools in the country to win an NSPA Pacemaker. Also in 2005, the school's yearbook, The Highlander, was chosen as a finalist for the NSPA Pacemaker award, and Highland Park Television was chosen as a finalist for the NSPA Broadcast Pacemaker; Highland Park Television won the award the following year. The Bagpipe received a second Gold Crown Award in 2011 for the previous year's newspaper. The Highlander has won several awards, including a Gold Crown Award in 2018 and a Pacemaker award in 2019.

In the winter of 2012 and spring of 2013, numerous bomb threats were found across the campus. Students and faculty were released three times early, and the FBI was eventually called in. An arrest was made in April 2013.

In 2013, the stage of the high school's auditorium (Palmer Auditorium) was honorarily named after Linda Raya, a longtime drama teacher at the school. Raya's 40+-year career at Highland Park saw countless theatrical productions, which now continue on the newly named Linda Raya Stage.

In 2014, HPISD, HPHS, and Superintendent Dawson Orr received national attention for the controversial banning of seven books previously used in high school English studies after a group of parents protested the books' contents. The books were The Art of Racing in the Rain, by Garth Stein; The Working Poor: Invisible in America, by David K. Shipler; Siddhartha, by Hermann Hesse; The Absolutely True Diary of a Part-Time Indian, by Sherman Alexie; An Abundance of Katherines, by John Green; The Glass Castle, by Jeannette Walls; and Song of Solomon, by Toni Morrison.

On September 29, 2014, Orr reversed his decision to ban the books, writing in an email to parents, "I made the decision in an attempt to de-escalate the conflict, and I readily admit that it had the opposite effect. I take full responsibility for the decision, and I apologize for the disruption it has caused."

In 2015, Orr retired and was replaced by Tom Trigg, who had previously served as the superintendent of Blue Valley Unified School District in Overland Park, Kansas. Trigg's salary upon hiring was notable for its size, coming in at a base of $325,000 (compared to Dallas ISD's superintendent salary of $306,000).

== Admissions ==
According to The Dallas Morning News, in 2005, the high school's ethnic makeup was about 99% white. In 2014, 90.3% of the graduating class was white; in 2015, 89.1% of the graduating class was white. In the 2015–16 school year, 88.4% of the Highland Park High School student body was white.

In the 2010–11 school year, HPHS had no low-income students. By the 2015–16 school year, that number remained at 0.0% economically disadvantaged students for the entire district. In 2010–11, 7.9% of the students were considered "at risk," but in 2015–16, that rose to 11.4%. About 80% of students participate in extracurricular activities, and over 50% participate in athletic teams.

The Park Cities (Highland Park and University Park) are often called "The Bubble." The Texas Education Agency campus profiles state that the funds spent per student at Highland Park are similar in amount to those spent per student at Woodrow Wilson High School. The average teacher's salary at HPHS was $60,770 compared to the state average of $51,891.

== Curriculum ==
Although students are only required to complete 50 hours of community service to graduate, the graduating class of 2017 averaged 150 hours per senior.

=== Standardized testing ===
==== National Merit Scholarship program ====
HPHS students take the PSAT in grades 10 and 11 and thus qualify for National Merit Scholarship Program awards. The following table summarizes recent years' awards:

NMSP Awards by Graduating Year
	2014	2015	2016	2017	2018	2019	2020	2021	2022	2023	2024	2025
Finalists	7	14	14	26	14	25	11	13	14	16	12	-
Semifinalists	8	14	16	27	14	26	12	13	14	16	13	15
Commended	39	36	47	36	40	24	35	32	28	25	30	36
Hispanic Scholars	6	6	7	5	9	14	3	5	14	14	10	8
Indigenous Scholars							0	0	1	7	5	1
African American Scholars								2	2	2	2	0
First Generation Scholars								0	0	0	0	2

==== SAT/ACT ====
About 99% of HPHS students take the SAT or ACT. The average SAT score in 2015–16 was 1833 (out of 2400) compared to a national average score of 1243. The average ACT score in 2015–16 was 27.6 (out of 36) compared to a national average score of 20.6.

==== Advanced Placement (AP) and International Baccalaureate (IB) ====
Most HPHS students take AP courses; HPHS does not offer IB courses. HPHS offers open enrollment for more than 20 AP courses. The school requires all students in AP courses to take the corresponding AP exam. 78.6% of HPHS students took an AP class and the ensuing exam in May 2015, compared to the state average of 24.9%. In May 2017, 1,093 Highland Park students took a combined 2,900 AP exams. In May 2015, 78.9% of exams were passed, meaning the student scored three or higher. That compares to a state passing rate of 49.1% in May 2015 and a national passing rate of 67% in May 2017.

=== College ===
HPHS has a graduation rate consistently above 98%, compared to the state average of 89.0% in 2015. The six-year longitudinal graduation rate was 99.8% compared to the state average of 90.9%. 86.0% of HPHS graduates in 2015 were rated college-ready in both English language arts and mathematics by the TEA compared to a state average of 35.0%. Scholarships offered to the graduating class of 2016 exceeded a comparable monetary value of $14,500,000—almost $30,000 per senior. After graduation, 94% of the class of 2016 matriculated to a four-year college, including Harvard, Stanford, West Point, and Air Force. Other HPHS graduates have attended Princeton, Yale, and Dartmouth.

A 2011 The Dallas Morning News report stated that 93% of HPHS students were "college-ready" (ready to attend post-secondary educational institutions).

== Extracurricular activities ==
=== Athletics ===
In 2005, Sports Illustrated listed HPHS as Texas's best sports program (and 16th in the U.S.).

==== Baseball ====
The baseball team's games are held at Scotland Yard (Highland Park), immediately north of the high school campus.

==== Swimming and diving ====
The Highland Park girls' swimming and diving team holds the UIL record with ten consecutive state titles.

==== Gymnastics ====
In 1995, the Highland Park men's gymnastics team won state with Burton Rhodes finishing 1st in the Floor event. In 1990, 1991. and 1992, Peter Hegi finished 1st in All-Around.

==== Tennis ====
As of the end of the 2020 season, the school's tennis team has won 21 state titles, making it the school's most successful sport. From the start of the 2008 season until November 2015, the team kept an unbroken winning streak of 174 matches. It was broken on November 11, 2015, when HPHS lost to New Braunfels in the 6A semifinals, marking the first time since 1999 that HPHS did not compete in the state championship. From 2008 through 2014, the team won eight consecutive state titles. The team returned to win the 2016, 2017, 2018, 2019, and 2020 state titles.

==== Football ====
Football Records by Year
Season	Conf	Dist	Head coach	Overall record	District record	Playoff outcome
2004	4A-I	10	Randy Allen	8-2	5-0	Lost Bidistrict
2005	4A-I	10	Randy Allen	15-0	5-0	Won Championship
2006	4A-I	10	Randy Allen	11-1	7-0	Lost Area
2007	4A-II	10	Randy Allen	16-0	7-0	Lost Championship
2008	4A-I	10	Randy Allen	11-2	6-1	Lost Regional
2009	4A-I	10	Randy Allen	11-2	7-1	Lost Regional
2010	4A-II	10	Randy Allen	12-1	7-0	Lost Regional
2011	4A-I	10	Randy Allen	12-2	7-0	Lost Regional
2012	4A-I	10	Randy Allen	9-2	7-0	Lost Bidistrict
2013	4A-I	10	Randy Allen	14-2	7-0	Lost SF
2014	6A-II	10	Randy Allen	10-2	6-1	Lost Area
2015	6A-II	10	Randy Allen	10-2	7-0	Lost Area
2016	5A-I	15	Randy Allen	14-2	6-1	Won Championship
2017	5A-I	15	Randy Allen	15-1	7-0	Won Championship
2018	5A-I	6	Randy Allen	16-0	7-0	Won Championship
2019	5A-I	6	Randy Allen	11-3	7-0	Lost Regional
2020	5A-I	7	Randy Allen	10-2	5-1	Lost QF
2021	5A-I	7	Randy Allen	10-2	6-0	Lost Area
2022	6A-II	7	Randy Allen	11-1	8-0	Lost Area
2023	6A-II	7	Randy Allen	11-2	7-1	Lost Regional
2024	5A-I	7	Randy Allen	14-2	6-0	Lost Championship
2025	5A-I	7	Randy Allen	12-2	6-0	Lost QF

===== 20th century =====
In the 1920s, Bryan Street High School players called the HPHS football team the "silk stocking boys." Games between the two schools caused so many riots among the spectators that they were banned from playing each other. H. B. Howard was the football coach at the time. Shirley Hodges, a Dallas pediatrician, served on the HPISD school board and was the team's first doctor.Coached by Rusty Russell (1942–45) and led by Doak Walker and Bobby Layne, the Scots made it to the championship game in 1944 and 1945. After losing 20-7 to Port Arthur in 1944, Highland Park tied Waco 7-7 in the 1945 state championship in front of a record 45,790-person crowd at the Cotton Bowl, becoming co-champion. In 1947, HPHS lost the state final 22-13 to San Antonio Brackenridge. In 1957, HPHS defeated Port Arthur 21-9 under the guidance of Thurman Jones.

===== 21st century =====
The HPHS football team is now coached by Randy Allen, who holds a 467-99-6 record as of 2025, making him Texas's winningest active high school football coach and its second-winningest of all time. Allen received the 2013 Grant Teaff Fellowship of Christian Athletes Lifetime Achievement Award, joining such coaching greats as Tony Dungy and Bobby Bowden. As of the end of the 2018 season, Allen has led the Scots to four state titles in 2005, 2016, 2017, and 2018.

In 2005, Matthew Stafford led Highland Park to an undefeated season for the 4A Division I state championship, playing behind center and future major league baseball pitcher Clayton Kershaw. The 2005 season was HPHS's only undefeated, untied season ever. The team beat Marshall 59-0, the largest margin of victory ever in a UIL 11-man state championship football game.

In 2007, the Scots went undefeated into the state final against Lake Travis High School but lost 36-34. As of 2007, Highland Park Scots football teams had made a state-record 49 playoff appearances.

In 2016, the Scots won the Division I 5A state final against Temple, Texas, 16-7.

In 2017, the Scots won the Division I 5A state final against Manvel Prep High School, 53-49 on December 22 in front of 24,975 people at AT&T Stadium. The Scots overcame a 10-point deficit in the game's last three minutes and won just as Manvel was one yard from scoring again. This marked the school's first-ever back-to-back state championships. The 2017 season broke the school record for the most points scored in a single season, with 732 points in 16 games. As of 2017, they have had eight state finals appearances (and won five of them).

In 2018, Highland Park won its third straight state championship in a game against Shadow Creek and completed a perfect 16-0 record.

In 2019, the Scots were the Division I 5A divisional champions.

==== Cross country ====
The Highland Park girls' cross country team has set numerous records, sending a runner to the state meet every year since the program was created. The team has won more state championships than any other cross-country team in Texas.

==== Lacrosse ====
As of the close of the 2017 season, the Highland Park boys' lacrosse team has won seven Division I and four Division II Texas High School Lacrosse League (THSLL) state championships. This includes two years (2012 and 2015) when the DI and DII teams won their titles simultaneously. DII titles are notable because many Texas high schools do not compete at the DI level, making DII titles the highest achievement for many schools. The team has included 23 US Lacrosse All-Americans since 2004.

As of 2018, HPHS has fostered the development of 28 players who went on to play Division I NCAA lacrosse.

Three of the seven DI state titles were victories over St. Mark's School of Texas (2009, 2010, and 2012), and two were over the Episcopal School of Dallas (ESD) (2005 and 2008). St. Mark's and ESD are both in Dallas near Highland Park. Other rivals include Jesuit College Preparatory School of Dallas (another Dallas-based team), which beat HPHS in the 2016 and 2017 DI title games.

In 2022, Mike Pressler was named head lacrosse coach upon his retirement from the Bryant Bulldogs. He had also previously coached the Duke men's lacrosse team.

Unique among Highland Park High School's sports, the lacrosse team is not school-run because lacrosse is not a UIL-sanctioned sport. It runs as a private organization.

==== Highland Belles ====
The drill team at Highland Park High School is called the Highland Belles. The Belles perform dance routines at halftime during football games, and Basketball Games. The team also makes appearances at other community events such as; Elementary school fundraisers, the Fourth of July Parade and other local events. The Highland Belles compete in the XL division at local and national competitions. At the 2024 Independence High School Crowd Pleasers regional competition the Belles placed 1st in the XL category and 1st overall at the competition. The Belles also compete in Walt Disney World at Contest of Champions and in 2024, were named XL division national champions and 7th place overall. They also had the highest scoring Kick routine at the competition. The Belles were founded in 1983–84. Angie Harmon, a Highland Park graduate, credits Wheat with inspiring her to have confidence as an actress.

==== Field hockey ====
While it is not an official school sport, HPHS has a field hockey team. Founded in 2009, it is considered a club team. Tryouts are held every spring for both the junior varsity and varsity teams. The field hockey season runs from August to November. The team plays against other teams in the Dallas-Fort Worth Metroplex.

==== State titles ====
- Baseball
  - 1998(4A)
- Girls Cross Country
  - 1981(5A), 1982(5A), 1988(4A), 1989(4A), 1992(4A), 1997(4A), 1998(4A), 1999(4A), 2001(4A), 2002(4A), 2004(4A), 2010(4A), 2011(4A), 2012(4A)
- Football
  - 1945(All), 1957(ALL), 2005(4A), 2016 (5A DI), 2017 (5A DI), 2018 (5A D1)
- Boys Golf
  - 1950(2A), 1951(2A), 1977(4A), 1989(4A), 1990(4A), 1991(4A), 1992(4A), 1993(4A), 2001(4A), 2002(4A), 2003(4A), 2005(4A), 2006(4A), 2008(4A), 2010(4A), 2013(4A), 2019(5A)
- Girls Golf
  - 1998(4A), 1999(4A), 2000(4A), 2008(4A)
- Boys Lacrosse
  - Division I: 2004, 2005, 2008, 2009, 2010, 2012, 2015
  - Division II: 2008, 2012, 2015, 2018
- Girls Soccer
  - 1994 (All), 1996 (All), 2000 (4A), 2002 (4A), 2012(4A), 2016 (5A)
- Gymnastics
  - 1995
- Boys Swimming
  - 2000(4A), 2017(5A), 2018 (5A)
- Girls Swimming
  - 2001(4A), 2002(4A), 2003(4A), 2004(4A), 2005(4A), 2006(4A), 2007(4A), 2008(4A), 2009(4A), 2010(4A)
- Team Tennis (22)
  - 1982–83 (5A), 1989–90 (4A), 1990–91 (4A), 1991–92 (4A), 1997–98 (4A), 2001–02 (4A), 2003–04 (4A), 2004–05 (4A), 2005–06 (4A), 2006–07 (4A), 2008–09 (4A), 2009–10 (4A), 2010–11 (4A), 2011–12 (4A), 2012–13 (4A), 2013–14 (4A), 2014–15 (6A), 2016–17 (5A), 2018–19 (5A), 2019-2020 (5A), 2020-2021 (5A, 2021-2022 (5A)
- Boys Track
  - 1940(All)
- Boys Wrestling
  - 1999(All), 2000(All), 2003(All), 2005(All), 2006(All)
- Volleyball
  - 2025(5A/D1)

Highland Park holds the UIL record for most athletic state titles by one school: 77 (in all classes).

In 2025, Highland Park won the 5A D2 Boys Soccer state championship game, but their win was vacated hours later after the school self-reported having used an ineligible player.

=== Band ===
The Highlander Band's performance includes making its first-ever UIL State Marching Band finals appearance in 2017 where the band made the top ten. Their success continued into 2019 when they earned 2nd place in the UIL State Marching Band finals, marking the highest state placement of the band in its history. In 2021, the Highlander band returned to the UIL State Marching Band Contest, making finals and placing 5th overall. State Marching Band Contest Archives

The Highland Park Wind Ensemble ranked 4th in 2018 and 2nd in the 2020 TMEA Honor Band under the direction of Reagan Brumley.

=== Literary festival ===
In 1995, the first Highland Park Literary Festival began as a collaboration between interested parents and the English Department. The event has become an annual festival where HPHS students have enjoyed meeting, working with, and learning from distinguished writers, including George Plimpton, Doug Wright, Michael Chabon, Marion Winik, Scott Simon, Tim O'Brien, Russell Banks, Anchee Min, Billy Collins, Tobias Wolff, and Jamie Ford.

=== Speech and Debate ===
The Highland Park Speech and Debate team is highly successful having attained titles in various formats. Team success includes multiple qualifications and high placements at the Texas Forensic Association (TFA) and UIL State tournament as well as the Tournament of Champions (TOC).

==== Team Success ====
===== UIL =====
The team won UIL State Policy Debate Championships in 2026, 2025, and 2001 with another finals appearance in 1928. They also were in the semis in 2018, 2011, and 1996. In Lincoln-Douglas the team has semi-finals showings in 2022, 2021, 2010 and 2004.

===== TFA =====
In Policy Debate the team won championships in 2013 and 2004. They also attained back to back championships in Duet Interpretation in 1998 and 1999. In 1981 the team also won the Dramatic Interpretation championship.

===== TOC =====
In Lincoln-Douglas the team placed second at the 2006 Tournament of Champions and in 2019 the team placed in the quarters of the policy division.

== Awards and recognition ==
In the September 1981 issue of Money Magazine, Highland Park was ranked as one of the top twelve public high schools in the United States; in January 1984, Parade Magazine listed Highland Park as among the top fifteen schools in the United States. In 2008, Highland Park was ranked 15th in Newsweek Magazine's list of the top public high schools in the United States, based on the Challenge Index by Jay Mathews. Highland Park High School has been named a National Blue Ribbon School on two occasions, in 1984-85 and again in 2007. In 2012, Highland Park was ranked 8th out of the top 10 high schools in North Texas by Children at Risk, a research and advocacy institute dedicated to helping children. In 2016, Highland Park was named one of "America's Best High Schools" by Newsweek Magazine and earned a spot on U.S. News & World Report's Gold Medal list of top high schools. In 2019, U.S. News & World Report ranked Highland Park the 210th best high school in the U.S. and 35th in Texas.

== Notable alumni ==
=== Arts/sciences/academics ===
- Donald D. Clayton, Class of 1953, prize-winning astrophysicist, SMU Distinguished Alumnus, American Academy of Arts and Sciences Fellow
- James Cronin, 1980 Nobel Prize-winning physicist
- Carol Hall, 1954, composer and lyricist
- Angie Harmon, 1991, actress, star of TV series Rizzoli & Isles, Law & Order
- Robert H. Jackson, 1952, Pulitzer Prize-winning photographer of Lee Harvey Oswald's assassination
- Wendy Kopp, 1985, founder of Teach for America
- Dorothy Malone, actress, 1956 Academy Award for Best Supporting Actress
- Jayne Mansfield, actress, star of films including Will Success Spoil Rock Hunter?, Promises! Promises!
- L. Lowry Mays, 1954, Chairman of the Joint Board, National Association of Broadcasters, Chairman, Board of Regents, Texas A&M University
- Stephanie March, 1993, actress, star of TV series Law & Order: Special Victims Unit
- Holland Roden, Class of 2006, actress, star of TV series Teen Wolf
- Megan Mylan, 2008 Academy Award-winning documentarian
- Willis Alan Ramsey, Class of 1969, singer/songwriter
- Phillip Sandifer, 1977 singer/songwriter
- Stark Sands, Class of 1997, film, stage, and television actor
- Elliot See, Class of 1945, Project Gemini astronaut, killed in the 1966 NASA T-38 crash
- Elizabeth L. Silver, novelist and attorney
- Doug Wright, Pulitzer Prize- and Tony Award-winning playwright
- Robert M. Young, Darwin scholar and Kleinian psychotherapist
- Pierce Brown, author

=== Athletics ===
- Fred Benners, quarterback for NFL's New York Giants
- David Browning, 1952 Olympic gold medalist in 3-meter springboard diving
- Hudson Clark, college football safety for the Arkansas Razorbacks
- Harrison Frazar, professional golfer
- Mike Heath, swimmer, three gold medals and one silver at 1984 Olympics
- Shaun Jordan, two-time Olympic gold medalist with 400-meter free-relay teams at 1988 Olympics and 1992 Olympics
- Clayton Kershaw, World Series Champion (2020, 2024, 2025) pitcher for Los Angeles Dodgers, 3-time Cy Young Award winner (2011, '13, '14), National League MVP (2014)
- Hank Kuehne, PGA Tour golfer and 1998 U.S. Amateur champion
- Kelli Kuehne, LPGA golfer and two-time U.S. Women's Amateur champion
- Trip Kuehne, 2007 U.S. Mid-Amateur Golf champion and 3-time NCAA golf All-American
- Bobby Layne, quarterback, 3-time NFL champion, Pro Football Hall of Fame inductee
- Lance McIlhenny, winningest quarterback in Southern Methodist University and Southwest Conference history
- Chandler Morris, quarterback for the North Texas Mean Green
- Richard Quick, Auburn University swim coach and 5-time U.S. Olympic coach
- Dave Richards, NFL offensive lineman
- John Roach, quarterback, defensive back, and punter for NFL's Green Bay Packers, Dallas Cowboys
- Al Rose, American football player
- Nick Rose, American football placekicker
- Kyle Rote Jr., NASL soccer star, son of Kyle Rote
- Scottie Scheffler, PGA golfer, 2022, 2024 Masters champion
- Anthony Schlegel, former linebacker for NFL's New York Jets, Cincinnati Bengals
- Bo Schultz, baseball pitcher
- Daniel Sepulveda, two-time Ray Guy Award winner, punter for Pittsburgh Steelers
- Matthew Stafford, former quarterback for Georgia Bulldogs, Detroit Lions, starting quarterback for Los Angeles Rams, NFL Super Bowl Champion (2022), NFL Most Valuable Player (2025)
- Doak Walker, 1948 Heisman Trophy winner, College and Pro Football Hall of Fame inductee
- Texie Waterman, choreographer for the Dallas Cowboys Cheerleaders
- Kyle Williams, offensive tackle for Seattle Seahawks
- Chris Young, MLB pitcher for 2015 World Series champion Kansas City Royals

=== Government ===
- James A Baker, justice of the Texas Supreme Court
- Chris Bell, U.S. representative
- Bill Clements, governor of Texas
- Starke Taylor, mayor of Dallas, cotton investor
- Brandon Williams, U.S. representative
- Christopher Ashby, United States Ambassador to Uruguay.

=== Other ===
- John Hinckley Jr., attempted assassin of President Ronald Reagan
- Trevor Rees-Jones, founder of Chief Oil & Gas
- George Seay, businessman, co-founder and CEO of Annandale Capital, philanthropist, and conservative political activist
