= Elizabeth L. Silver =

American writer and attorney (born 1978)

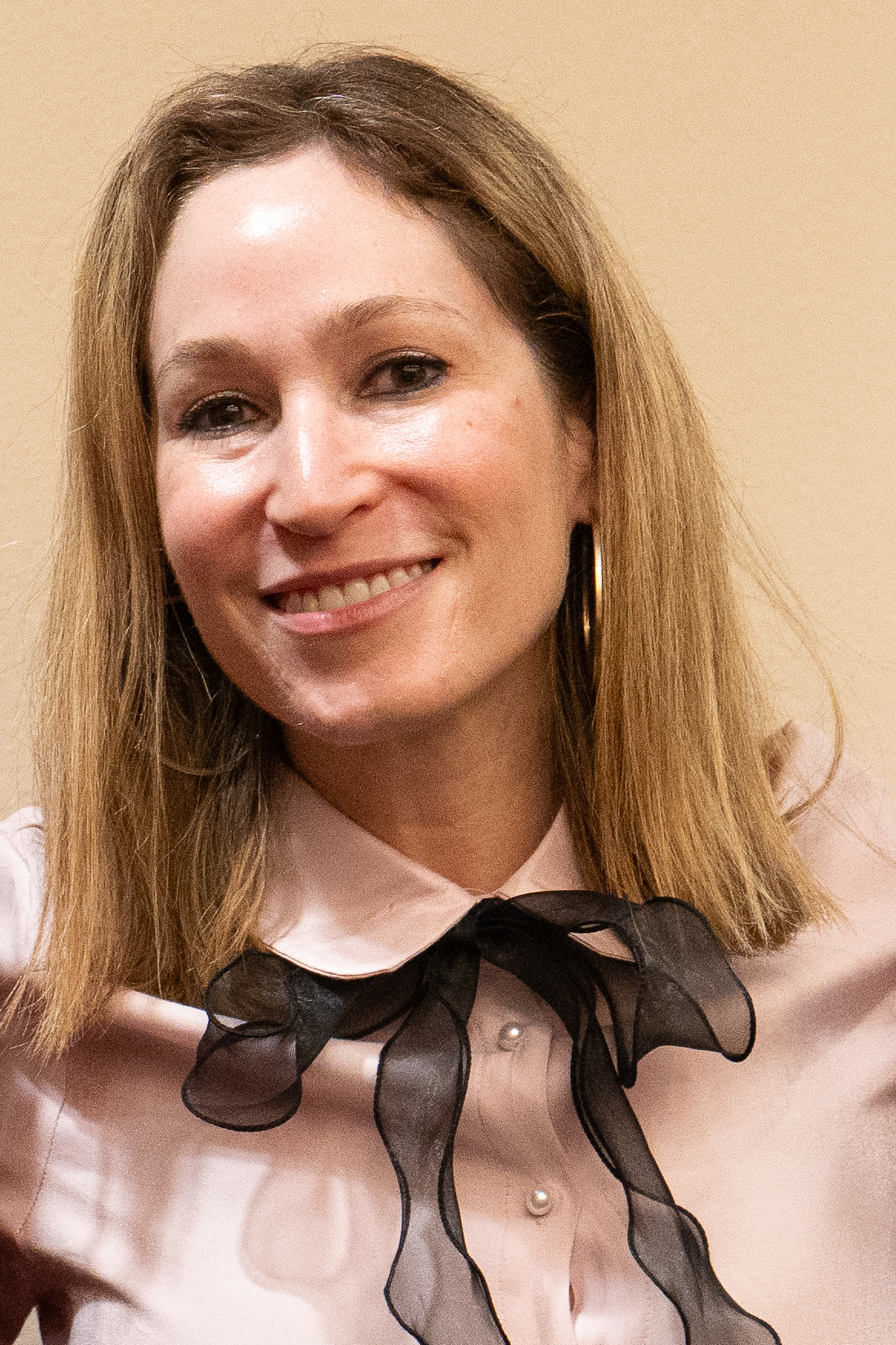
- Silver at AWP 2026
- Born: October 27, 1978 (age 47); New Orleans, Louisiana, USA
- Education: University of Pennsylvania; University of East Anglia; Temple University
- Occupations: Novelist; memoirist
- Spouse: Amir Moldovan (m. 2006)
- Children: 2
- Writing career
- Years active: 2013–present
- Website: www.elizabethlsilver.com

Elizabeth L. Silver (born October 27, 1978) is an American writer, attorney, and creative writing teacher. She has published two novels with legal themes, The Execution of Noa P. Singleton (2013) and The Majority (2023), as well as a medical memoir, The Tincture of Time: A Memoir of (Medical) Uncertainty (2017). She lives in Los Angeles with her family.

== Life and career ==
Born in New Orleans and raised in New Orleans and Dallas, Silver comes from a Jewish family, and her father worked as a surgeon. Her father and grandparents were Holocaust survivors; her grandmother was saved by Folke Bernadotte and her grandfather by Oscar Schindler. She attended Highland Park High School in Dallas and the University of Pennsylvania in Philadelphia, graduating in 2001 with a degree in English. After college, she taught English as a second language in Costa Rica and worked in book publishing in New York. She subsequently earned a master's degree in creative writing from the University of East Anglia in 2004.

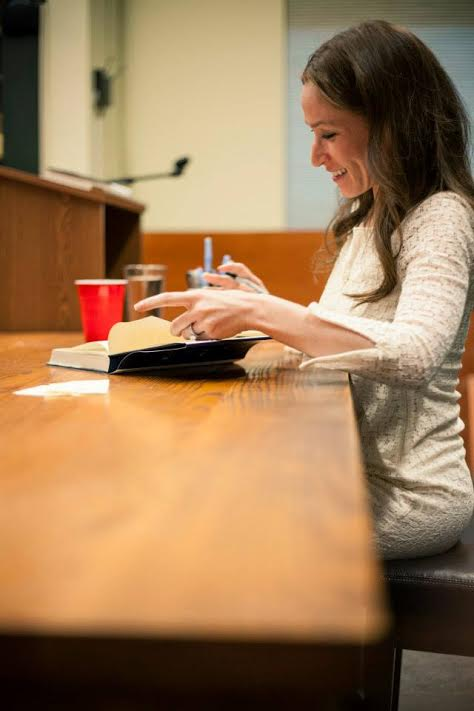
Silver in 2014

Silver attended law school, earning a Juris Doctor (J.D.) degree in 2008 from the Temple University Beasley School of Law. Stating that she "very quickly fell in love with criminal law", she worked for two years as a research attorney for the Texas Court of Criminal Appeals, an experience that helped inspire her first published novel, The Execution of Noa P. Singleton. She continues to work occasionally in the legal field. During Donald Trump's first term as president, she spent a week working as a volunteer attorney for asylum seekers at the Mexico–United States border.

Silver married Amir Moldovan, a rheumatologist, on May 28, 2006. The couple live in Los Angeles with their two children. In addition to her own writing projects, Silver teaches creative writing at the University of California, Los Angeles (UCLA) and is the founder and director of Onward Literary, which provides mentorship to aspiring writers.

Diagnosed with breast cancer in July 2022, Silver had a double mastectomy in February 2023, accompanied by chemotherapy and radiation treatment. She wrote articles for The Guardian and Ms. magazine highlighting the inadequacy of mammograms for screening women with dense breast tissue.

== Writing ==
Silver has published two novels, both inspired by her legal training and experience. Her first novel, The Execution of Noa P. Singleton, centers on a 35-year-old woman who has spent ten years on death row for murdering her father's pregnant girlfriend. The novel explores the evolving relationship between the murderer and the victim's mother, a Philadelphia attorney, who offers to convince the state governor to commute Noa’s sentence to life imprisonment if Noa will reveal why she carried out the killing. It has been translated into six languages. Her second novel, The Majority, focuses on the fictional 83-year-old Sylvia Olin Bernstein as she reflects on her life and career on the Supreme Court of the United States. It is a fictionalization of the life of Ruth Bader Ginsberg, who served as an associate justice on the Supreme Court from 1993 until her death in 2020.

Additionally, Silver has published a medical memoir, The Tincture of Time: A Memoir of (Medical) Uncertainty, chronicling her experience as a parent within the medical system after her six-week-old daughter suffered an intracerebral hemorrage and was admitted to the newborn and infant critical care unit at Children’s Hospital Los Angeles. Silver's writing has also been published in The Washington Post, New York magazine, Harper's Bazaar, The Los Angeles Review of Books, Lilith, McSweeney's, and elsewhere.

== Notable works ==
- The Execution of Noa P. Singleton (Crown Publishing Group, 2013)
- The Tincture of Time: A Memoir of (Medical) Uncertainty (Penguin Press, 2017)
- The Majority (Riverhead Books, 2023)
