= George Seay =

American businessman

- Born: 1967 (age 58–59); Dallas, Texas, U.S.
- Education: Highland Park High School
- Alma mater: University of Texas at Austin; Southern Methodist University
- Occupation: Businessman
- Spouse: Gretchen
- Children: 3

George Seay is an American Dallas-based businessman, co-founder and chairman of Annandale Capital, and conservative political leader. Seay was Texas finance chairman for Texas Governor Rick Perry's 2012 Presidential campaign, and a senior adviser to Marco Rubio's 2016 Presidential campaign. Seay is a seventh-generation Texan and the grandson of Bill Clements, who was the first Republican governor of Texas since Reconstruction. He is on numerous boards and philanthropic groups, including The University of Texas McCombs School of Business Advisory Board, The Clements Center for National Security, The Texas-Israel Alliance, 7th Generation Foundation, New Covenant Foundation, Hope Through Healing Hands and the Southwestern Medical Foundation.

== Early life ==
George Seay was born in Dallas, Texas in 1967, the son of Nancy Clements Seay and George Edward Seay Jr. He attended St. Mark's School of Texas and Highland Park High School (University Park, Texas), where he was co-captain of the Highland Park Football team, was the 1984-1985 Student Council President and recipient of the prestigious Blanket Award for exemplifying the four pillars of the National Honor Society: scholarship, character, leadership, and service. He was close friends with future congressman Brandon Williams, whom he met in 5th grade at St. Mark's.

After receiving opportunities to attend Princeton University and Stanford University, he chose to attend the University of Texas at Austin, where he received a Bachelor of History degree (summa cum laude). He also received his MBA from UT Austin, with a Dean's Award for Academic Excellence. He attended Southern Methodist University Law School where he graduated with his J.D. degree (cum laude). While at SMU, he was the president of the SMU Law Review Association and member of the Order of the Barristers (limited to the top 11 law students based upon leadership, scholarship, service and character).

== Career ==
Seay began his career working as a campaign aide to his grandfather, Texas Governor William Clements, during his 1986 campaign for re-election. His other political and policy roles include time spent as an aide to United States Deputy Secretary of State Lawrence Eagleburger in the U.S. State Department in Washington.

Following graduation from SMU, Seay worked as an attorney in Dallas at the office of Locke Purnell Rain Harrell. From 1994 to 1996, he was employed as a commercial litigator in areas including transportation law, commercial contracts, mediation, aviation law, and appellate law. Following this, he moved to Austin, TX to start his own law practice, while simultaneously pursuing his MBA at the University of Texas at Austin.

In 1998, at his great uncle's urging, Seay founded Seay Stewardship and Investment Company, specializing in U.S. stocks and bonds. Seay w s chief executive officer from 1998 to 2008, as the firm branched out to a broader range of investments including oil and gas, real estate, private equity and venture capital.

Following this, Seay co-founded with Cullum Clark and Lee Blaylock, his second investment firm Annandale Capital, LLC, in 2005 which manages money for high net worth individuals, families, and institutional clients.

== Politics ==
Seay is an active participant in Republican Party politics, having been on the campaign team for Mitt Romney's presidential run in 2008, as a senior adviser and financial supporter. In 2012, he was Texas Finance Chairman for then-Texas Gov. Rick Perry in his run for president. Since then, he supported Florida Senator Marco Rubio, in his 2016 run for president, including hosting fundraisers at his home.

Seay is also the co-founder of Legacy, a national fellowship of business and civic leaders committed to policy, philanthropy, and political engagement.

Seay is the chairman of the Texas-Israel Alliance.

== Personal life ==
Seay resides in Dallas, Texas with his wife Gretchen, his three children, and three step-children. In his free time, he enjoys time spent with family, specifically "in the San Juan mountains of southwestern Colorado and the Texas Hill Country", as well as hunting and fishing.
