= Scotland Yard (Highland Park) =

Baseball park in Highland Park, Texas, US

Coordinates: 32.85061°N 96.80769°W

Scotland Yard is a baseball park located in Highland Park, Texas, and was the home field of TCL Highland Park Blue Sox from 2004 to 2005 before moving to Plano, Texas for the 2006 season. It is the home field of the Highland Park Scots baseball team.
