= University Park, Texas =

- City
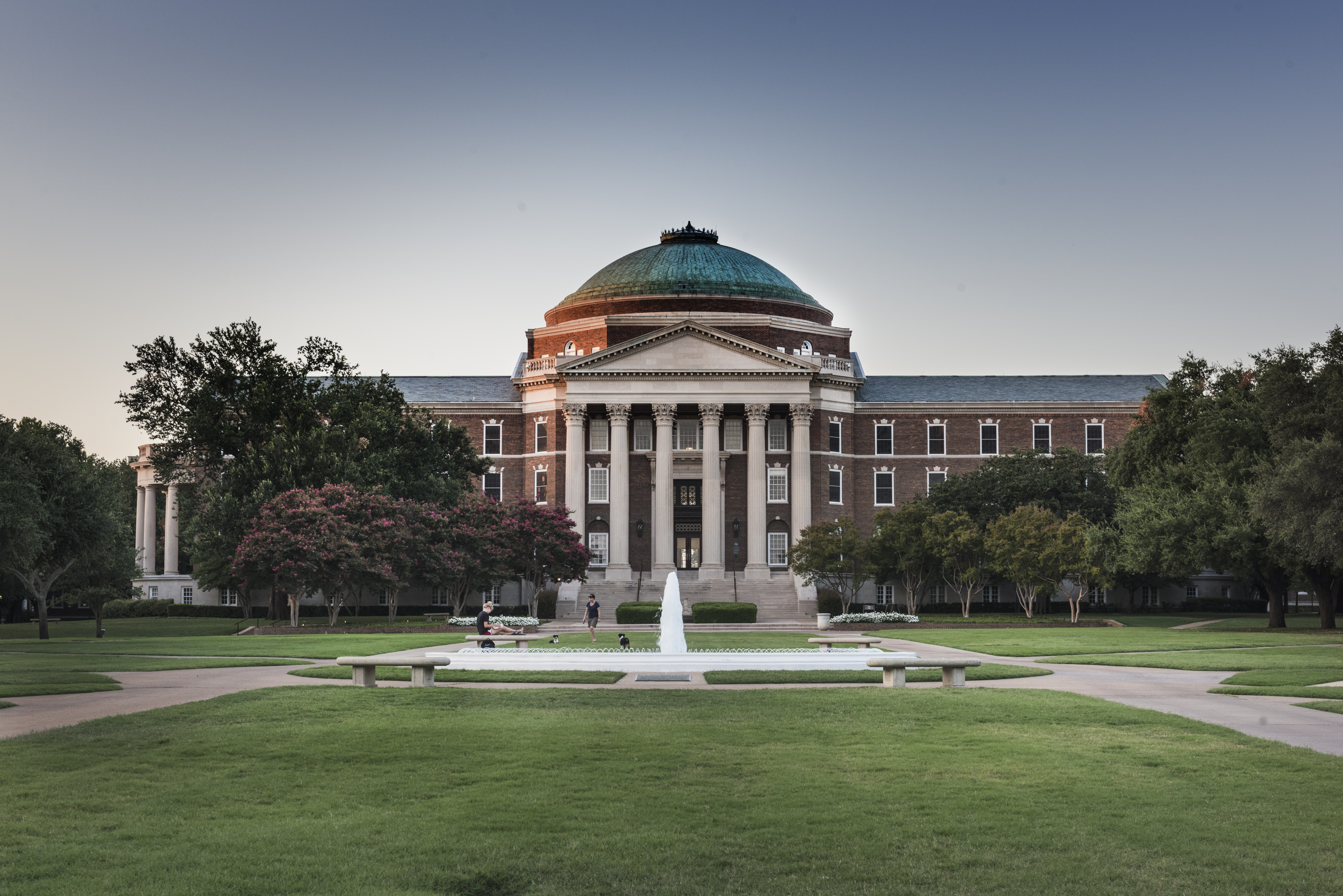
- Dallas Hall, on the campus of Southern Methodist University

- Logo

- Location of University Park in Dallas County, Texas
- Interactive map of University Park, Texas
- Location in Texas
- Coordinates: 32°50′58″N 96°47′31″W
- Country: United States
- State: Texas
- County: Dallas

Government
  - Type: Council-Manager
  - City Council: Mayor Randy Biddle; Liz Farley; Mark Aldredge; Bob Myers; Phillip B. Philbin
  - City Manager: Robbie Corder

Area
  - Total: 3.69 sq mi (9.57 km^{2})
  - Land: 3.69 sq mi (9.55 km^{2})
  - Water: 0.0077 sq mi (0.02 km^{2})
- Elevation: 548 ft (167 m)

Population (2020)
  - Total: 25,278
  - Density: 6,857.8/sq mi (2,647.83/km^{2})
- Time zone: UTC-6 (Central)
  - Summer (DST): UTC-5 (Central)
- ZIP code: 75205 & 75225
- Area codes: 214, 469, 945, 972
- FIPS code: 48-74492
- GNIS feature ID: 1377191
- Website: uptexas.org

University Park is a city in Dallas County, Texas, United States, in suburban Dallas. The population was 25,278 at the 2020 census. The city is home to Southern Methodist University.

University Park is bordered on the north, east and west by Dallas and on the south by the town of Highland Park. University Park and Highland Park together comprise the Park Cities, an enclave of Dallas.

Addresses in University Park may use either "Dallas, Texas" or "University Park, Texas" as the city designation, although the United States Postal Service prefers the use of the "Dallas, Texas" designation for the sake of simplicity. The same is true for mail sent to Highland Park.

== History ==
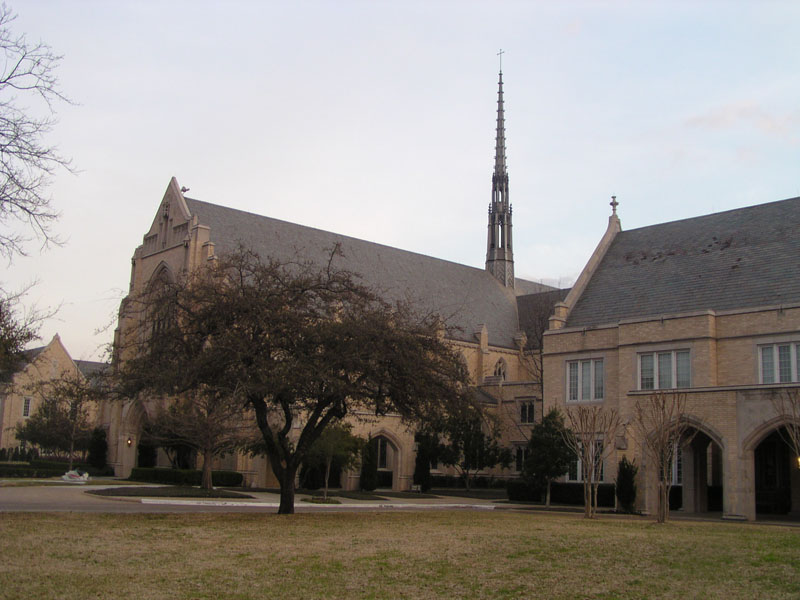
Highland Park Presbyterian Church (HPPC) in University Park

University Park began as a cluster of homes surrounding the fledgling Southern Methodist University, which was founded in the then-rural Dallas County in 1915. The university supplied these homes with utility service until 1924, when the growing population could no longer be supported by the school's utilities. In response, the area's homeowners first sought annexation into the town of Highland Park, but were refused due to the high cost that would have been required to provide the necessary utility and safety services. Shortly thereafter, Dallas also refused a request for annexation on similar grounds.

Community leaders organized to incorporate as a separate individual city. According to state law, incorporation required that area residents hold an election on the issue before the new city could be officially formed and recognized. On April 24, 1924, voters approved the measure by a 5:1 margin. Operating under the commission form of government, the city began the work of shaping the new government and addressing the pressing need to establish basic municipal services. To provide for the financial needs of the city, another election was held soon thereafter to authorize the issuance of municipal bonds. Passing by a near unanimous margin, the $150,000 bond issue funded the installation of a new water supply system, street paving, and the construction of a new city hall and fire station. When first incorporated, the city encompassed 515 acres (2.08 km^{2}), 380 homes, and 1200 residents.

As a result of efforts to build and improve the city, University Park grew to a population of over 20,000 residents by 1945 and had become one of the most prestigious locations in the area. In fact, the community's attractiveness and tax value had risen to such an extent that the city of Dallas now wanted to annex University Park into its boundaries. At the time of the election, even the Board of Commissioners favored the annexation. In the largest voter turnout to that date and still one of the largest in city history, the annexation was denied by a 53% to 47% margin.

In 1946 an election to adopt a Home Rule Charter was held, but the measure failed and the city continued to operate as a General Law city. In 1989, voters approved a Home Rule Charter which officially adopted a council-manager form of government and expanded the three member board of Commissioners into a five-member city council.

Since the 1940s, the population and area of University Park has stabilized at 24,000 residents and 2,350 acres (4.7 square miles). The city is now surrounded by Dallas on three sides and the town of Highland Park to the south.

Originally University Park was a middle class community. Highland Park residents spearheaded the creation of the Highland Park Independent School District and asked the neighbors to the north to become a part of the district; taxes were lower since the district included University Park's population. HPISD had no racial diversity in the 1950s and 1960s, when other Dallas-area school districts dealt with racial integration and white flight. The federal court orders to integrate had no effect in HPISD since it did not receive federal money. As a result, values of HPISD-zoned properties in University Park rose dramatically and the demographic makeup became wealthier, with smaller houses being replaced by larger ones circa the 1970s.

== Geography ==
According to the United States Census Bureau, the city has a total area of 3.7 square miles (9.6 km^{2}), of which 3.7 square miles (9.6 km^{2}) is land and 0.27% is water.

== Demographics ==
Historical population
Census	Pop.	Note	%±
1930	4,200		—
1940	14,458		244.2%
1950	24,275		67.9%
1960	23,202		−4.4%
1970	23,498		1.3%
1980	22,254		−5.3%
1990	22,259		0.0%
2000	23,324		4.8%
2010	23,068		−1.1%
2020	25,278		9.6%
U.S. Decennial Census

=== 2020 census ===
As of the 2020 census, University Park had a population of 25,278. The median age was 26.0 years, 27.3% of residents were under the age of 18, and 10.0% were 65 years of age or older. For every 100 females there were 96.6 males, and for every 100 females age 18 and over there were 95.1 males age 18 and over.

100.0% of residents lived in urban areas, while 0.0% lived in rural areas.

There were 7,129 households in University Park, of which 49.3% had children under the age of 18 living in them. Of all households, 69.5% were married-couple households, 10.6% were households with a male householder and no spouse or partner present, and 18.0% were households with a female householder and no spouse or partner present. About 14.3% of all households were made up of individuals and 5.7% had someone living alone who was 65 years of age or older.

There were 7,598 housing units, of which 6.2% were vacant. The homeowner vacancy rate was 0.9% and the rental vacancy rate was 9.8%.

Racial composition as of the 2020 census (NH = Non-Hispanic) (Note: Note: the US census treats Hispanic/Latino as an ethnic category. This table excludes Latinos from the racial categories and assigns them to a separate category. Hispanics/Latinos can be of any race.)
Race	Number	Percent
White	20,782	82.2%
Black or African American	350	1.4%
American Indian and Alaska Native	71	0.3%
Asian	1,944	7.7%
Native Hawaiian and Other Pacific Islander	6	0.0%
Some other race	384	1.5%
Two or more races	1,741	6.9%
Hispanic or Latino (of any race)	1,423	5.6%

== Politics ==
The city of University Park has consistently supported Republican presidential candidates in recent years. The seven most recent campaigns from 1996 to 2020 each earned over 60% of the city's vote, with the best showing being the 81.44% of the vote won by Texas native George W. Bush in 2000. However, the city's vote total is getting progressively more competitive, with Donald Trump receiving less than 70% of the vote in all three of his runs.

University Park city vote by party in presidential elections
Year	Democratic		Republican		Third Parties	
2024	32.1%	4,164	66.8%	8,661	1.1%	140
2020	36.1%	4,966	62.7%	8,624	1.3%	174
2016	30.7%	3,542	64.9%	7,498	4.5%	515
2012	18.2%	2,102	80.6%	9,296	1.1%	132
2008	23.4%	2,695	75.7%	8,707	0.9%	102
2004	20.7%	2,422	78.5%	9,197	0.9%	105
2000	15.8%	1,766	81.4%	9,106	2.8%	309
1996	29.3%	1,312	63.1%	2,824	7.6%	339

== Education ==
=== Primary and secondary schools ===
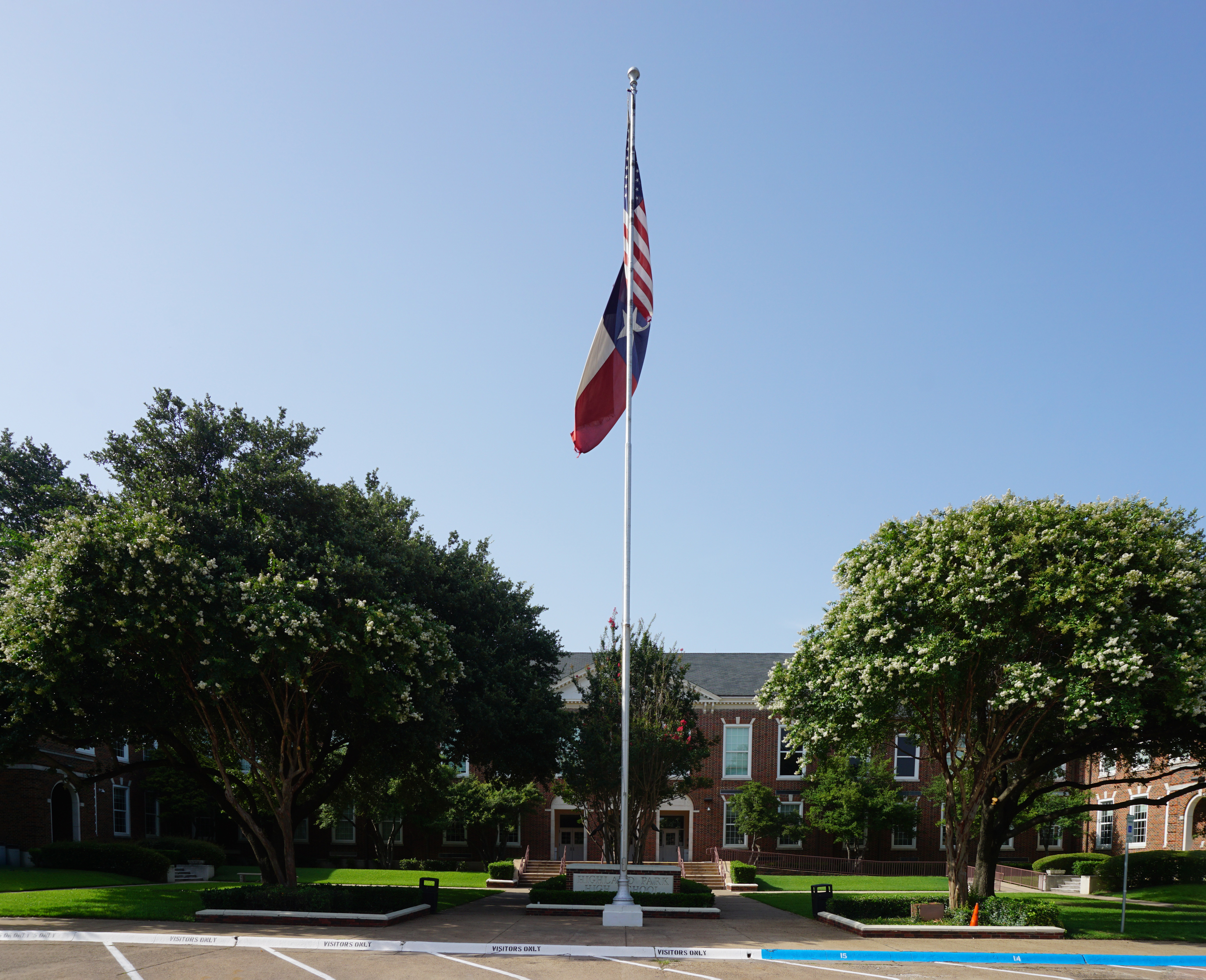
Highland Park High School

University Park is served by the Highland Park Independent School District (HPISD). As such, it is served by the HPISD's McCulloch Intermediate School and Highland Park Middle School (which share a campus located partially in Highland Park and partially in University Park), and Highland Park High School located in University Park. There are two HPISD elementary schools located in University Park (Hyer and University Park), two HPISD elementary schools located in neighboring Highland Park (Armstrong and Bradfield) and one elementary school located in the city of Dallas (Michael M. Boone Elementary). All five elementary schools serve sections of the UP city limits.

A small portion of University Park east of North Central Expressway is in the Dallas Independent School District. It is however not zoned for residential purposes.

=== Colleges, universities, and institutions ===
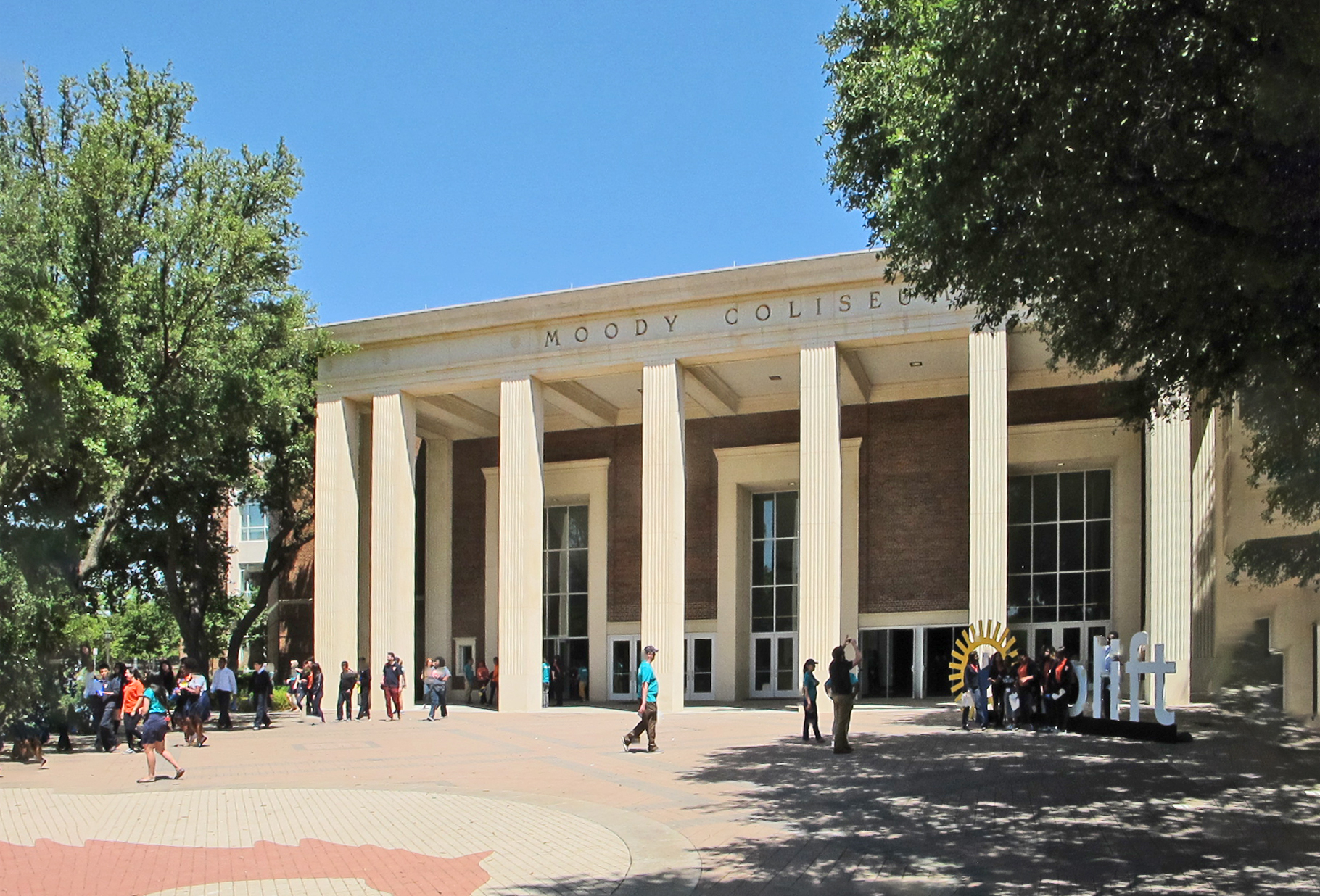
Moody Coliseum

Southern Methodist University is located in the city of University Park. The Meadows Museum, which houses the largest collection of Spanish art in the United States, can be found on the campus. The George W. Bush Presidential Center, the presidential library for George W. Bush, can also be found on the campus, and was opened in 2013.

All of Dallas County (University Park included) is in the service area of Dallas College (formerly Dallas County Community College).

=== Public libraries ===
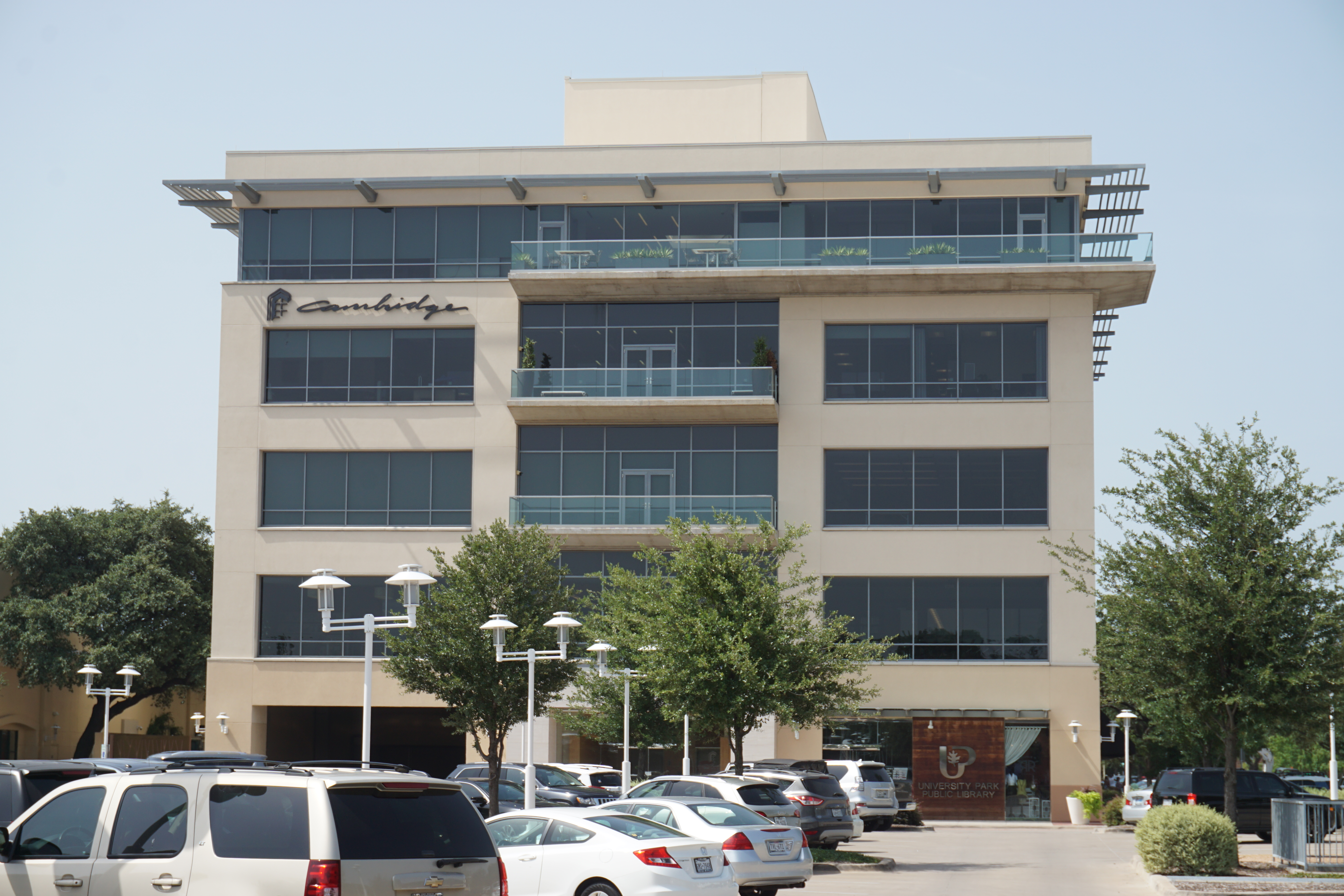
Preston Center Plaza, which houses the University Park Public Library

The new University Park Public Library location is the second floor of Preston Center Plaza. The old location was the first floor of a Chase Bank building at the southern end of Snider Plaza, at the intersection of Daniel and Hillcrest. The owner of the former building, Albert Huddleston, charged the city $1 per year to use the building space, as of 2009.

The library opened on June 7, 2001, as the University Park Book Bank in Snider Plaza. Before this, the town had no library. Residents could pay to use the Highland Park Public Library or the Dallas Public Library. On April 1, 2002, the book bank became a municipal library.

== Parks and recreation ==
The City of University Park operates several parks. They include Burleson Park, Caruth Park, Coffee Park, Curtis Park, Elena's Children's Park, Germany Park, Goar Park, Linear Park, Smith Park, and Williams Park.

Burleson Park was named after James B. Burleson, who served as the Mayor Pro-tem and the city commissioner. University Park mayor H. E. Yarbrough dedicated the park on September 5, 1947. Elena Children's Park was named after Mary Elena Franklin, a girl who died at the age of three in an automobile accident on August 2, 1997. Over 500 corporations, families, and foundations contributed to the park.

The Holmes Aquatic Center, within Curtis Park, has a 50-meter (160 ft) pool, 1-meter (3.3 ft) and 3-meter (10 ft) diving boards, a water slide, and an accessibility ramp. The park also has a pool for younger children and a 1,500-square-foot (140 m^{2}) sprayground. University Park residents and residents of the Highland Park Independent School District are permitted to use the park. The city operates six tennis courts available only to University Park residents. Parks with tennis courts include Burleson, Caruth, Curtis, Germany, Smith, and Williams.

The Moody Family YMCA is in University Park. It was formerly known as the Park Cities-North Dallas Branch YMCA. Circa 2014 its previous building was to be demolished, and the YMCA leased 15,000-square-foot (1,400 m^{2}) in Preston Center for the period until its new building would open. It received its current name after the Moody Foundation donated $8 million in 2013 with the new name on the new building.

== Infrastructure ==
=== Public transit ===
University Park is a founding member of Dallas Area Rapid Transit. The city is primarily serviced by bus, including one fixed route along Preston Road and two shuttle services to Southern Methodist University, DART's GoLink microtransit service, and paratransit. There is no light rail service in the city, but there are two stations, SMU/Mockingbird and Lovers Lane, directly across Central Expressway that provide access to the Red, Orange, and Blue lines. University Park contributes a one cent sales tax to DART in order to be a member. In 2026, citing concerns over the disparity between the level of service provided by DART and the city's financial contribution to it, city leaders called an election to ask voters whether to withdraw from DART. The residents narrowly voted 54–46 to remain a member of DART.

== Gallery ==
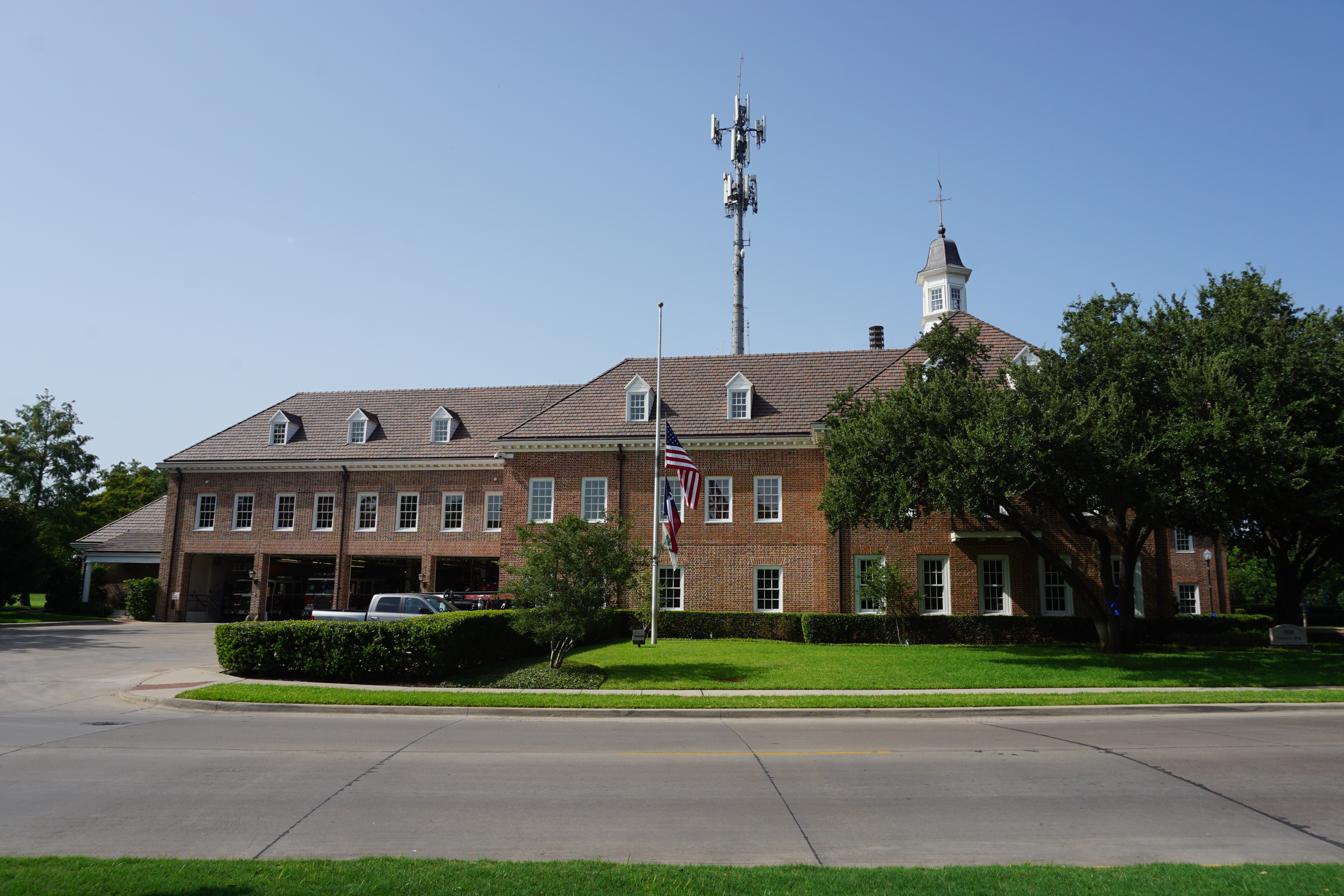
City Hall

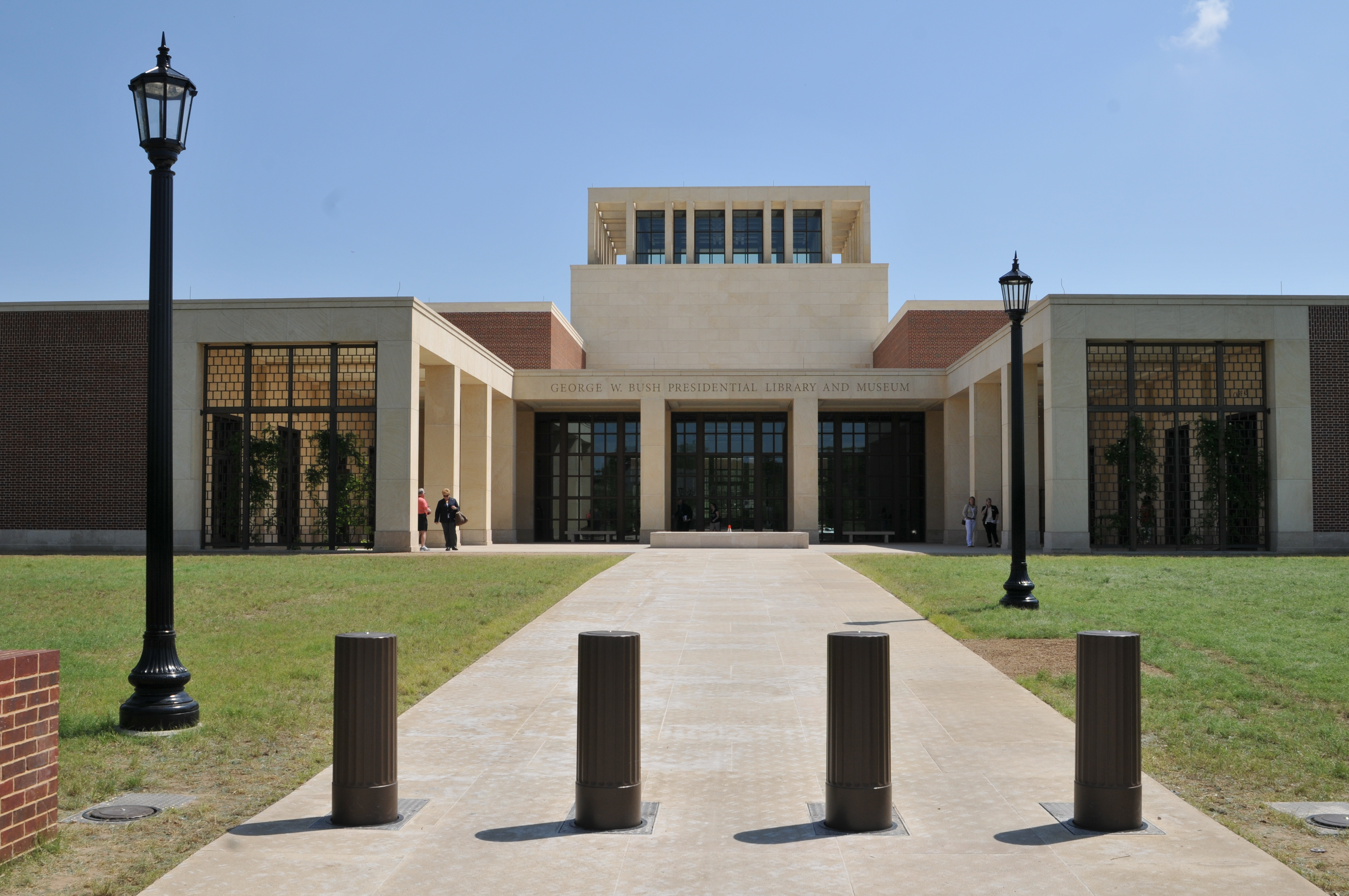
George W. Bush Presidential Center

== Notable people ==
- John Hinckley Jr., would-be assassin of President Ronald Reagan grew up in University Park and a graduate of Highland Park High School
- Colin Ridgway
- Doak Walker, 1948 Heisman Trophy winner at SMU, 1945 graduate of Highland Park High School
- Annie Julia Wyman, screenwriter, co-creator of television series The Chair, graduate of Highland Park High School
