= Wilbur David Cook =

American landscape architect

- Born: 19 June 1869; Atlanta, Georgia, U.S.
- Died: 27 February 1938 (aged 68)
- Occupation(s): Landscape architect, urban planner
- Known for: Master plans for Beverly Hills, California and Highland Park, Dallas, Texas

Wilbur David Cook (June 19, 1869 – February 27, 1938), or Wilbur D. Cook Jr., was an American landscape architect and urban planner from Atlanta. He designed the master plans for the city of Beverly Hills, California, and the city of Highland Park in Dallas, Texas.

== Career ==
=== Overview ===
According to a report by the Environmental Planning Branch of Caltrans,

Cook was the first trained landscape architect/city planner to work in the Los Angeles area. Cook had worked for the Olmsted Brothers, and participated with the Olmsteds and Daniel Burnham in the plan for San Francisco. Just prior to his move to Southern California he had worked with Charles Mulford Robinson on the park plan for the City of Oakland Cook's master plan for Beverly Hills was a radical departure from the monotonous grid patterns of [Henry] Huntington's and other developments on the one hand, and the somewhat exotic plans such as those for Naples and Venice [California] on the other. His plan was firmly based on the concepts of the City Beautiful Movement.

=== Projects ===
With the Olmstead firm, Cook had worked on Palos Verdes Estates, and the Panama–California Exposition in Balboa Park, San Diego, California.

His other work included Exposition Park in Los Angeles, and other city parks in Monrovia, Anaheim, and Fullerton, California.

Cook also designed the original grounds of the Beverly Hills Hotel, with Elmer Grey as the architect.

With George Duffield Hall (1877–1961), Cook formed the firm Cook & Hall, Landscape Architects and City Planners. When Ralph D. Cornell (1890–1972) joined it became Cook, Hall & Cornell (1924–1933).
