= Highland Park Middle School =

Highland Park Middle School can refer to:

- Highland Park Middle School (Texas) in Highland Park, Texas, part of the Highland Park Independent School District
- Highland Park Middle School in St. Paul, Minnesota, part of St. Paul Public Schools
- Highland Park Middle School in Highland Park, New Jersey, part of the Highland Park Public School District
- Highland Park Middle School in Beaverton, Oregon, part of the Beaverton School District
