= Highland Park Independent School District =

School district in Texas, United States

Location
- 7015 Westchester Dr. Dallas, TX 75205-1061 Dallas–Fort Worth metroplex, Texas United States
- Coordinates: 32.8506°N 96.8068°W

District information
- Motto: "Enter to learn. Go forth to serve."
- Grades: PreK–12
- Established: 1914
- Superintendent: Mike Rockwood
- Schools: 7
- NCES District ID: 4823250

Students and staff
- Students: 6,840 (2018–19)
- Teachers: 440
- Student–teacher ratio: 15.53

Other information
- Website: www.hpisd.org

Highland Park Independent School District (HPISD) is a public school district based in University Park, Texas, within the Dallas–Fort Worth metroplex, serving most of the town of Highland Park, all of the city of University Park, and two small portions of Dallas, one that is north of Greenbrier Drive, south of Northwest Highway, east of the Dallas North Tollway, and west of Douglas Avenue; and one that is west of Preston Road and north of Colgate Avenue. The Dallas Independent School District surrounds HPISD on all sides.

HPISD administers seven schools and seven campuses. The District is run by a school board consisting of seven elected, unpaid members. The District's number for TEA reporting purposes is 057911.

== History ==
Businessman John Armstrong was one of the major founders of the town of Highland Park, having in 1906 purchased 1,400 acres of prairie land north of downtown Dallas which would go on to become the town. After his death on April 26, 1908, his widow and sons-in-law—Edgar Flippen and Hugh Prather—took over his work. On April 14, 1914, the newly incorporated town of Highland Park petitioned the Dallas County Judge to allow them to establish an independent school district. From 1909 until this time, children wishing to attend school had attended classes in a little red frame house operating under the name of "Highland Park School" that had been moved to the 4700 block of Abbott by community leader Michael Costello and a group of citizens. However, the judge granted the petition for an independent school district on May 5, 1914, and HPISD was born. Once the school district held an election for the first Board of Trustees, the Board began searching for a suitable location for the new school. Mrs. Alice Armstrong, widow of the late John S. Armstrong, generously donated the needed land in the area bounded by Cornell Avenue, Byron Avenue, and St. John's Drive in memory of her husband, thus helping found the HPISD and its first school, appropriately named Armstrong. The Board of Trustees approved $30,000 in bonds to build the new Armstrong School on July 16, 1914.

Highland Park residents spearheaded the creation of the HPISD and asked the neighbors to the north to become a part of the district; taxes were lower since the district included University Park's population. Initially the district did not receive funds from the U.S. federal government. Its student body was entirely white, and the servants' quarters in the houses did not have black children as the wealthy white families did not hire servants with families. As a result, HPISD had no black children in the 1950s and 1960s, when other Dallas-area school districts dealt with racial integration and white flight. The federal court orders to integrate had no effect in HPISD since it did not receive federal money. As a result, values of HPISD-zoned properties in University Park rose dramatically and the demographic makeup became wealthier, with smaller houses being replaced by larger ones circa the 1970s.

=== Schools ===
==== Armstrong ====
HPISD first opened its doors on October 12, 1914, with John S. Armstrong School, a one-story cream-yellow brick building on Cornell Avenue with only four rooms and a basement. The staff at the time included one principal, Belle Francis, and two teachers. The fourth room was not needed and thus served as a Sunday school room. There being no easy transportation system, students simply walked to school each morning across the open fields that would later become residential areas of Highland Park. After the passage of a couple years to 1916, the staff had grown in size to include twelve teachers, most without college degrees, and the student enrollment had grown to 140 students, ranging from kindergartners to high school sophomores. Students wishing to complete high school had to go to Bryan Street High School in Dallas (originally called Dallas High School and later Crozier Tech). Some of the Armstrong School staff at the time included Francis herself as well as Mary Inis (kindergarten), Katherine Mansfield (first grade), and Anne Rose McLean (second grade). To accommodate these increases in size, a second story was added to the original Armstrong School building in 1916 which allowed for an additional four classrooms, a clinic, and an office. The first-ever HPISD yearbook was published following the 1916–1917 school year under the title The Highlander, a name which remains to this day. It was dedicated to Mrs. Armstrong with the following inscription:

TO HER who has ever proven in every way a faithful friend of our beloved school, and an ardent sympathizer in and promoter of its best interest, to Mrs. John S. Armstrong, this, our first volume is affectionately dedicated.

After the approval of a 2015 bond package, Armstrong Elementary School received important addition and renovations.

==== Middle School & Intermediate School ====
In 1922, a second school was added to the district: a new building between Normandy Avenue and Granada Avenue which would house Highland Park High School. Grades eight and above moved to the new high school, and the first class graduated from Highland Park High School in 1924. Superintendent Gable moved his office from Armstrong School to the high school. After the addition of the high school building on Emerson Avenue, this building turned the home of Highland Park Junior High School for students in grades seven through nine. Eventually it would come to house Highland Park Middle School and Arch H. McCulloch Intermediate School (MIS) and collectively serve grades five through eight. The approval of the 2015 bond package, allowed the school to receive a parking garage built underneath the existing athletics fields and In 2025, the school tore out its existing grass and inputed turf on both the athletic fields, and the playground.

==== Bradfield ====
As the student body size increased, the district added another school in 1926, Bradfield Elementary, located between Southern Avenue and Mockingbird Lane. The funds for the school came from a 1925 bond election for $250,000 to build the Bradfield Elementary and University Park Elementary Schools. To conserve money, both schools had identical blueprints: two-story brick structures with 12 rooms each. Named after former HPISD board president John S. Bradfield, Bradfield Elementary School is located in Block 150 of Highland Park West, and uses a Spanish Colonial Revival style. Foshee & Creek designed the school building with a cost of $68,200. The building permit was filed in 1930. Following the approval of the 2015 bond package, Bradfield Elementary School will be torn down and rebuilt beginning in the summer of 2018.

==== University Park ====
In 1928, the District added University Park Elementary School on Lovers Lane with the remaining funds from the 1925 bond election discussed above. Following the approval of the 2015 bond package, University Park Elementary School closed its doors in mid-2017 and was then completely demolished. A new building for the UP Elementary School, with a parking garage underneath, was built by Stantec Inc. and Balfour Beatty Construction, opening for the 2018–2019 school year.

==== High school ====
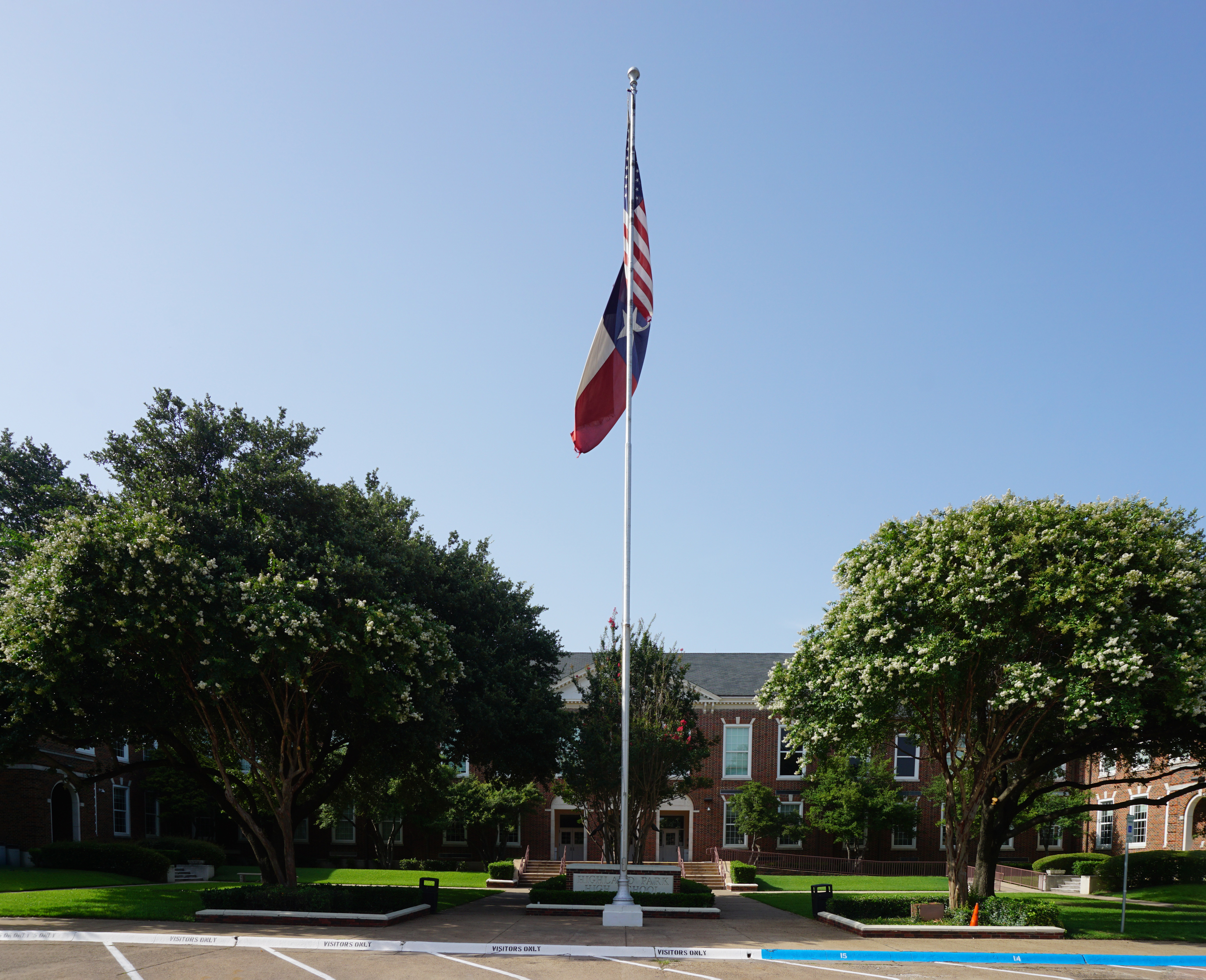
Highland Park High School in 2016.

In 1937, a new building on Emerson Avenue opened its doors and became the home of Highland Park High School. It cost taxpayers approximately $400,000 at the time. At around the same time, the education system added a twelfth grade, so the new Highland Park High School served students in grades ten through twelve. The old high school building on Normandy Avenue became a junior high school for students in grades seven through nine. The new building featured 32 classrooms, 2 gyms, 2 auditoriums, a library, a cafeteria, an armory, a clinic, offices, a public address system, tennis courts, a greenhouse, and a football field with permanent seats. In 1951, a new administration building near the high school campus opened. Today, Highland Park High School features three large plaques just inside the main entrance on Emerson Avenue which list the names of all HPHS alumni who went on to serve in the U.S. Armed Forces.

==== Hyer ====
From 1947-1949, yet another elementary was built: Hyer Elementary School, which opened for classes in January 1949. The building would have opened in 1941 if not for a steel shortage caused by World War II which delayed the construction. The Hyer Elementary School building was designed by architect Mark Lemmon and cost $408,000. Hyer Elementary School was named after Dr. Robert Stewart Hyer, a pioneer in education in Texas and the president of Southwestern University in Georgetown, Texas, from 1898 to 1911. Dr. Hyer is also well known for helping to found nearby Southern Methodist University and serving as its first president from 1911 to 1920. Newton L. Manning was the first principal of Hyer and frequently brought chickens, goats, and other animals to entertain the students. Following the approval of the 2015 bond package, Hyer Elementary School was torn down and rebuilt, opening in 2019.

The HPISD administration decided that the new Hyer will only have two stories instead of three after members of the community expressed opposition to a three-story design.

==== Michael M. Boone Elementary ====
In 2017 following a $361.4 million bond package approval which funded its land purchase and building, the most recent elementary school building between Wentwood Drive and Northwest Highway was added. The building currently serves as the home of the University Park Elementary School for the 2017–2018 school year. Because it was the first new school to be built in HPISD in nearly 70 years, much thought went into the design of the school. Key elements included larger classrooms, flexible group learning spaces, an underground parking garage, and an exterior appearance that mimicked that of the existing HPISD schools. Construction started in 2016, and was completed in 2017. Balfour Beatty Construction served as general contractor for the building process.

=== District ===
The HPISD district serves: all of the city of University Park, most of the town of Highland Park, and portions of Dallas.

The District comprises seven campuses: five elementary school buildings, one middle school building, and one high school building, with an enrollment of approximately 7,000 students employing 750 people, including more than 430 teachers. In 2009, the school district was rated "exemplary" by the Texas Education Agency.

HPISD and Highland Park High School received national attention in September 2014 for the banning of seven books previously used in high school English studies, after a group of parents protested the contents of these books. The seven books were: The Art of Racing in the Rain by Garth Stein; The Working Poor: Invisible in America by David K. Shipler; Siddhartha by Hermann Hesse; The Absolutely True Diary of a Part-Time Indian by Sherman Alexie; An Abundance of Katherines by John Green; The Glass Castle by Jeannette Walls; and Song of Solomon by Toni Morrison. Superintendent Orr eventually reversed the decision to suspend the books, stating in an email to parents, "I made the decision in an attempt to de-escalate the conflict, and I readily admit that it had the opposite effect. I take full responsibility for the decision, and I apologize for the disruption it has caused." He would retire shortly after the controversy ended.

In 2015, a $361.4 million bond package passed board approval and a citizens' vote. The package allowed for major renovations to all six existing campuses; the addition of a parking garage at Highland Park Middle School; the addition of new surface parking at Highland Park High School; the demolition of the high school's natatorium; and renovations to the Seay Tennis Center, the Multi-Use Building, and Highlander Stadium. Stantec Inc. and Balfour Beatty Construction were eventually hired to oversee most of the design and construction that ensued. In February 2016, the District sold $225 million in bonds with a 20-year amortization at an interest rate of 2.95%. Tax rates increased within the District to cover the additional costs.

==== Leadership ====
The HPISD is run by a seven-member school board of trustees who are elected to three-year terms each May.

The school board works with a paid superintendent. From 1914–2017, HPISD has been led by eight superintendents as follows:

Superintendents of HPISD
Years active	Name
1920-1945	H. E. Gable
1945-1954	William Buell Irvin
1954-1974	Frank Monroe
1974-1990	Winston Power
1990-2001	John P. Connolly
2001-2008	Cathy Bryce
2008-2015	Dawson Orr
2015–2023	Tom Trigg
2023-present	Mike Rockwood

== Academics ==
In 2016, the Moody Foundation presented Highland Park ISD with a grant of $5.8 million (equivalent to $7,780,782 in 2025) to fund Science, Technology, Engineering, Arts and Mathematics (STEAM) education in the district. The district named the initiative the Moody Innovation Institute to bring a focus on STEAM education to all students in the district. HPISD hired Dr. Geoffrey Orsak, former Dean of SMU's Lyle School of Engineering, to serve as the Executive Director of the Moody Innovation Institute in March 2017. Currently, plans are in the offing to use part of the funds to create a redesigned internship experience for students at Highland Park High School. Teachers across the District have formed a joint Design Team to implement the Moody Innovation Institute's programs in classrooms.

HPISD offers an elementary school Spanish learning program in each of its four elementary schools. The overall program is called Foreign Language in Elementary Schools (FLES), but since Spanish is the main focus of the FLES program another name is often used: Passport to Spanish. Passport to Spanish begins second-language Spanish instruction for all HPISD students at the Kindergarten level and runs through fourth grade.

In the 2016–2017 school year, Highland Park High School had 27 students named National Merit Semifinalists, its highest number of students to earn the honor in the District's history, dating back to 1958. To be recognized for National Merit Honors, students must take the PSAT, and only 16,000 students out of a pool of more than 1.6 million entrants (1%) are recognized as National Merit Semifinalists.

The 2017 TEA Accountability Report for HPISD said that every single campus, and thus the District as a whole, had "Met Standard." The four indexes calculated by the TEA put HPISD ahead of the state targets: 97 on Student Achievement (target of 60), 50 on Student Progress (target of 22), 68 on Closing Performance Gaps (target of 28), and 94 on Post-secondary Readiness (target of 60). HPISD earned a distinction in post-secondary readiness, making it one of just 58 districts in the state to do so.

== Athletics ==
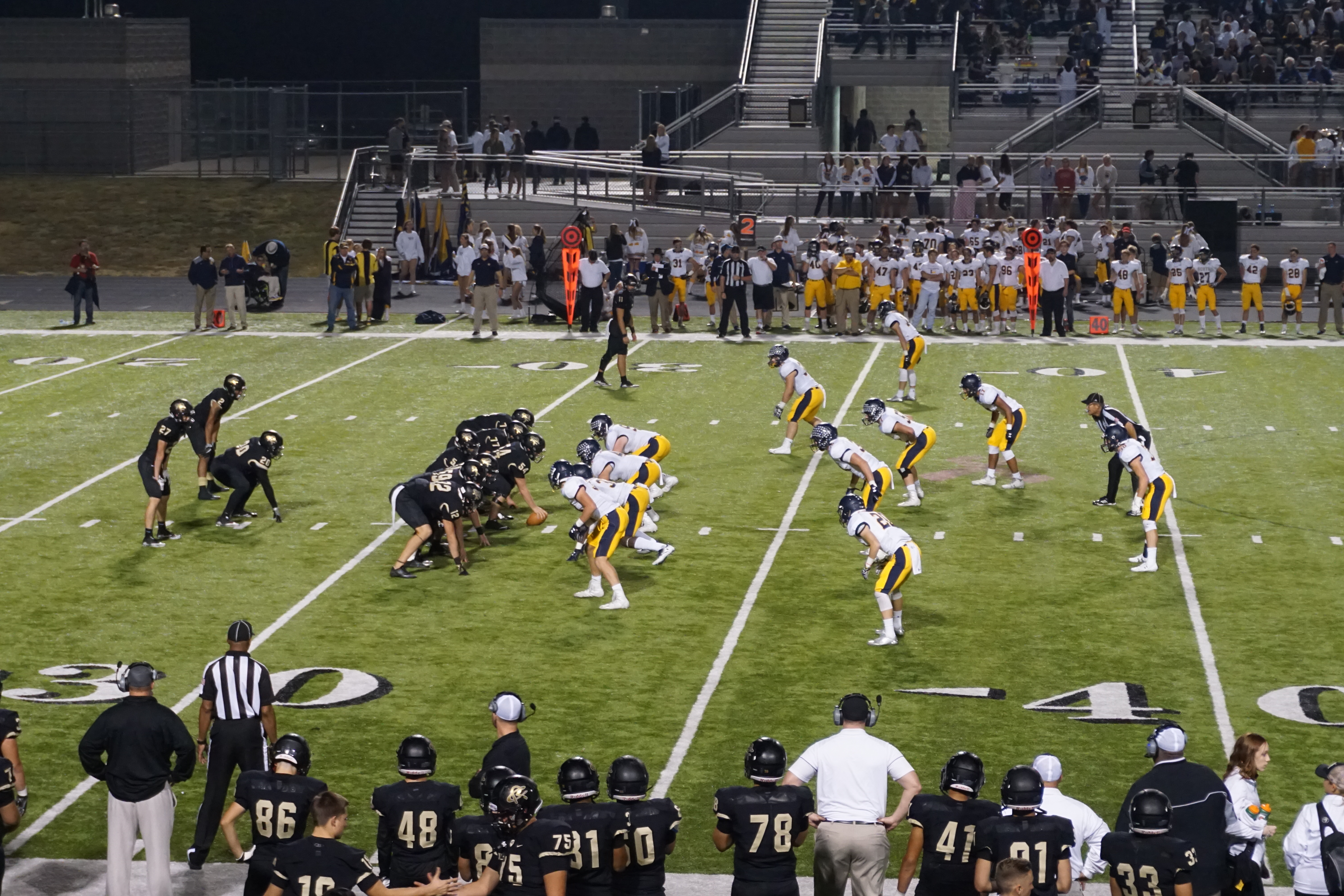
The Highland Park High School Scots football team plays Royse City in 2017.

During the 2016–2017 school year, Highland Park High School won UIL State Championships in tennis, football, boys swimming and diving, girls soccer, and boys golf. The Highland Park Scots football team is the winningest program in Texas high school football history with 802 wins. The Scots have won six football state championships in school history: 1945, 1957, 2005, 2016, 2017 and 2018.

== Schools ==
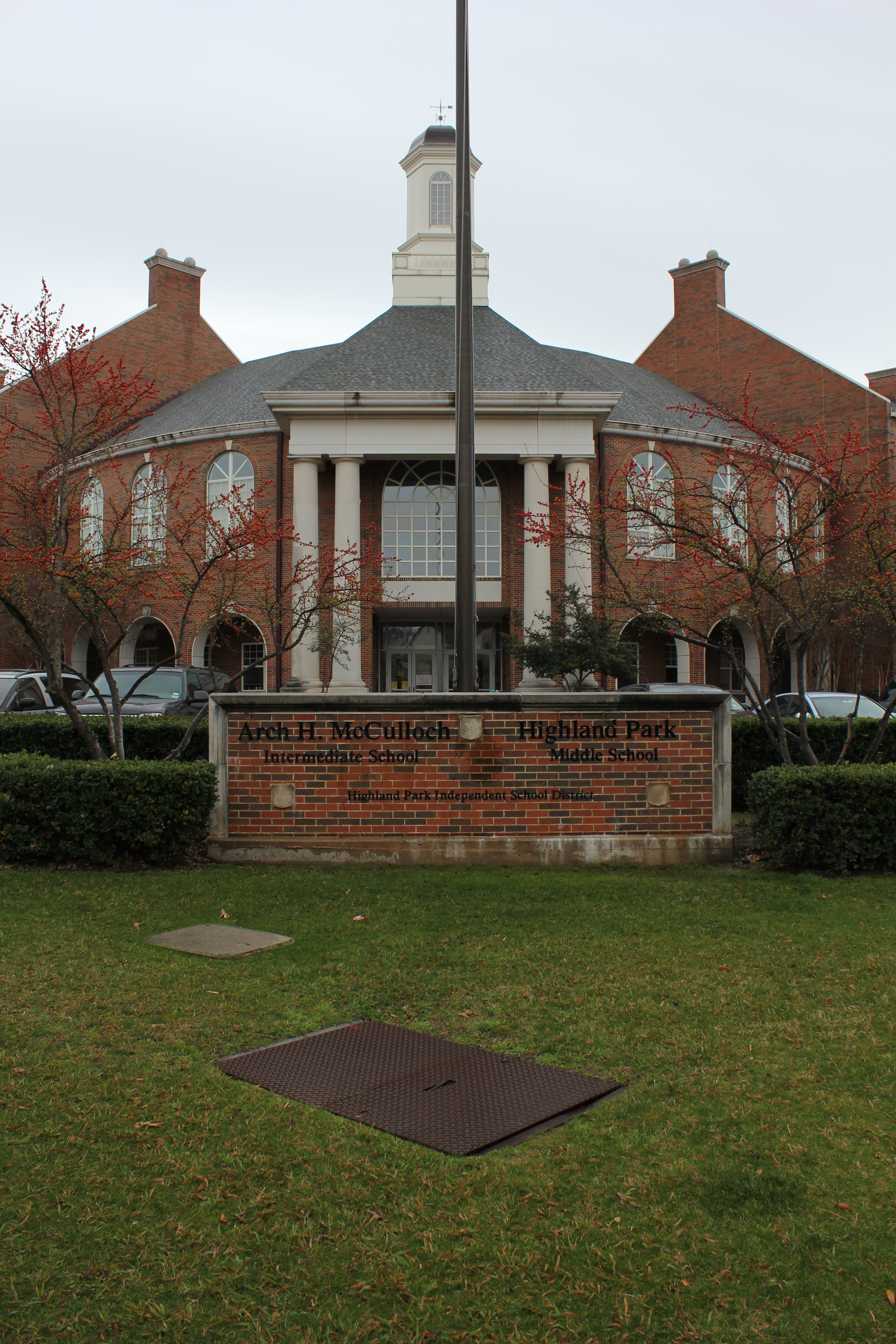
McCulloch Intermediate School and Highland Park Middle School

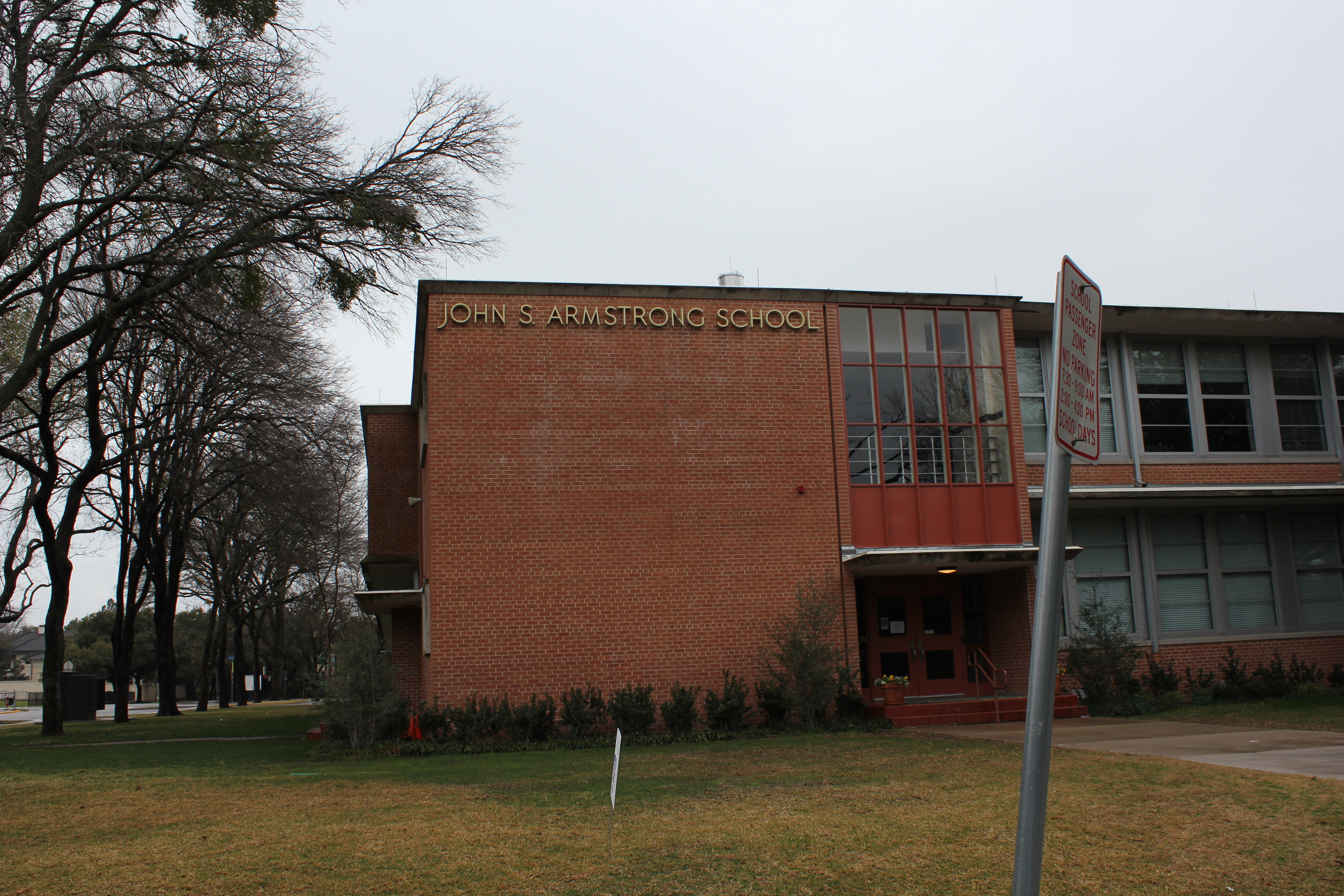
Armstrong Elementary School

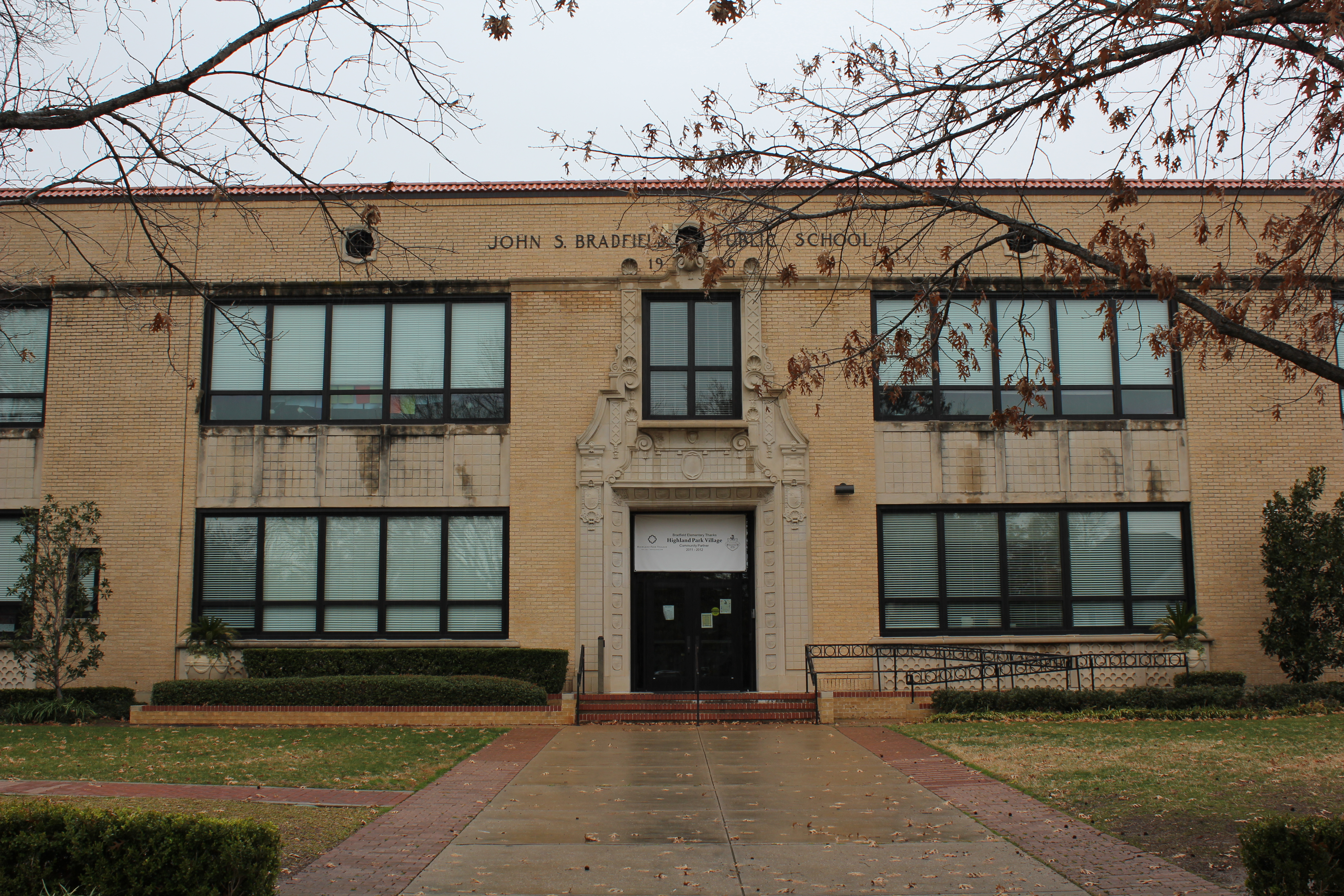
The Old Bradfield Elementary School (Now Demolished)

=== Secondary schools ===
- Highland Park High School (University Park)(Scots)
  - Grades 9-12
- Highland Park Middle School (Highland Park and University Park)(Raiders)
  - Grades 7-8
- Arch H. McCulloch Intermediate School (Highland Park and University Park)(Raiders)
  - Grades 5-6

Note: Highland Park Middle School and McCulloch Intermediate School occupy separate wings of the same building. The original building was the original home of the high school in the early 20th century. That building was demolished and the current HPMS/MIS was built on the same lot.

=== Elementary schools ===
- John S. Armstrong Elementary School (Highland Park)(Eagles)
  - National Blue Ribbon School in 1985 and 1986
- John S. Bradfield Elementary School (Highland Park)(Broncos)
  - National Blue Ribbon School in 1989-90 and 2005
- Robert S. Hyer Elementary School (University Park)(Huskies)
  - National Blue Ribbon School in 1993-94 and 2005
- University Park Elementary School (University Park)(Panthers)
  - National Blue Ribbon School in 1987-88 and 2006
- Michael M. Boone Elementary School (Dallas)
  - It is the district's fifth elementary school. The building, in the Dallas city limits on property formerly owned by Northway Christian Church opened in August 2017, but the building initially functioned as temporary homes to students from the other four elementary schools on a rotational basis until renovations were completed on the other four campuses. Eventually the new elementary school opened as its own school.

== Student body ==
In the 2015–2016 school year, HPISD had a student population of 7,171 people, of whom 2,114 were at Highland Park High School. The areas from which HPISD draws, Highland Park and University Park, have a reputation for being affluent, predominantly white areas. From 1997 to 2016 the number of non-Hispanic white students increased and the district never gained any significant low income population, contrasting with the white flight and increase in low income students in other Dallas County districts.

== Middle School Rebranding ==
In 2026, a new packaged plan allowed McCulloch Intermediate School and Highland Park Middle School to rebrand from the Raiders to the Scots and renovations were completed in August of 2026.

== See also ==
- List of school districts in Texas
