= Highland Park, Texas =

- Town
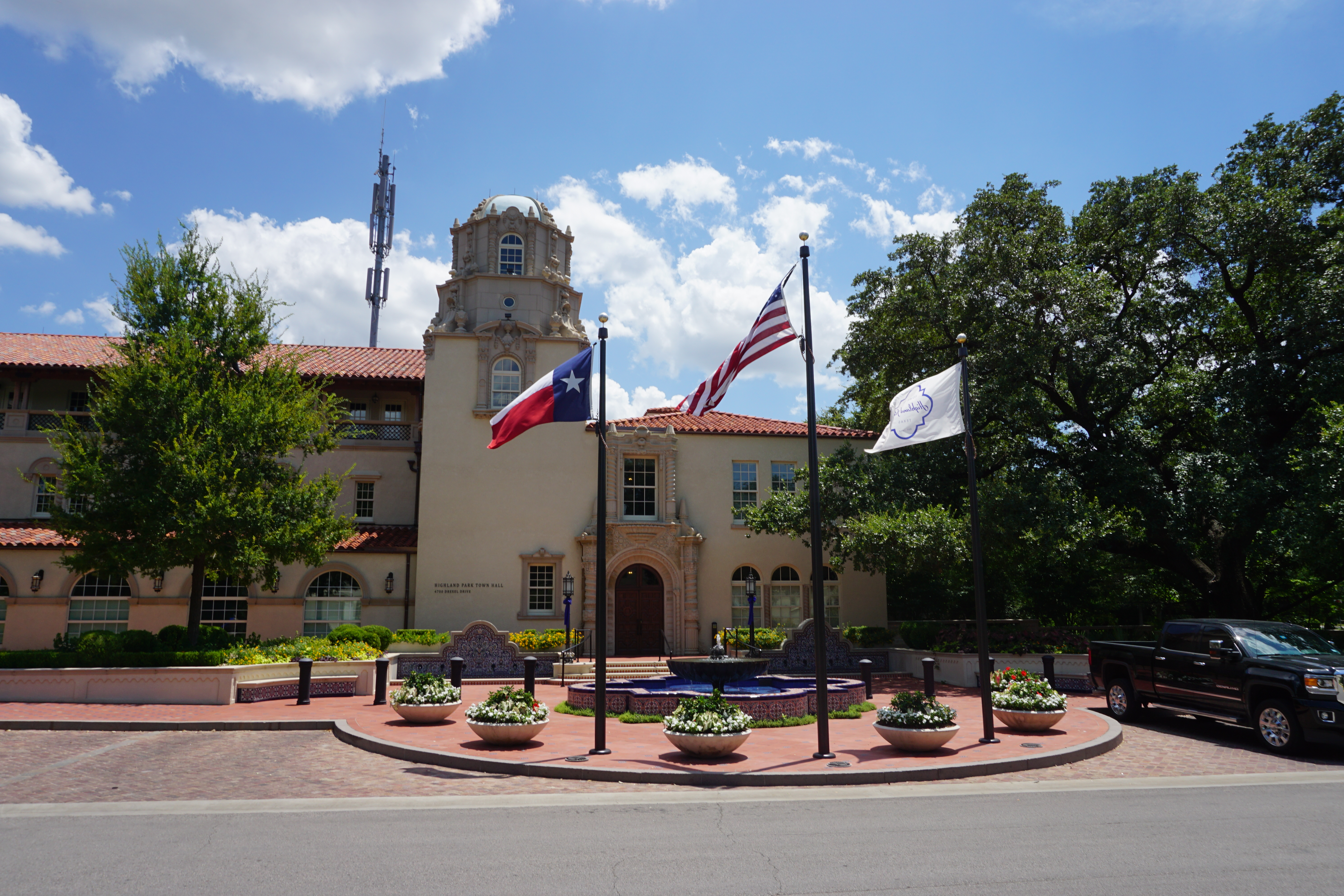
- Town Hall

- Flag Logo
- Interactive map of Highland Park, Texas
- Location in Texas
- Coordinates: 32°49′49″N 96°48′4″W
- Country: United States
- State: Texas
- County: Dallas

Government
  - Mayor: Margo Goodwin

Area
  - Total: 2.24 sq mi (5.81 km^{2})
  - Land: 2.24 sq mi (5.81 km^{2})
  - Water: 0 sq mi (0.00 km^{2})
- Elevation: 528 ft (161 m)

Population (2020)
  - Total: 8,864
  - Density: 3,950/sq mi (1,530/km^{2})
- Time zone: UTC-6 (Central)
  - Summer (DST): UTC-5 (Central)
- ZIP codes: 75205, 75209, 75219, 75225
- Area codes: 214, 469, 945, 972
- FIPS code: 48-33824
- GNIS feature ID: 1388240
- Website: Official website

Highland Park is a town in central Dallas County, Texas, United States, with a population estimated to be 8,719 in 2022, dropping from the previously recorded 8,864 in 2020. It is located between the Dallas North Tollway and U.S. Route 75 (North Central Expressway), 4 miles (6 km) north of downtown Dallas.

Highland Park is bordered on the south, east and west by Dallas and on the north by the city of University Park. Highland Park and University Park together comprise the Park Cities, an enclave of Dallas. Highland Park has been referred to as "a 2.2-square-mile residential island city".

== History ==
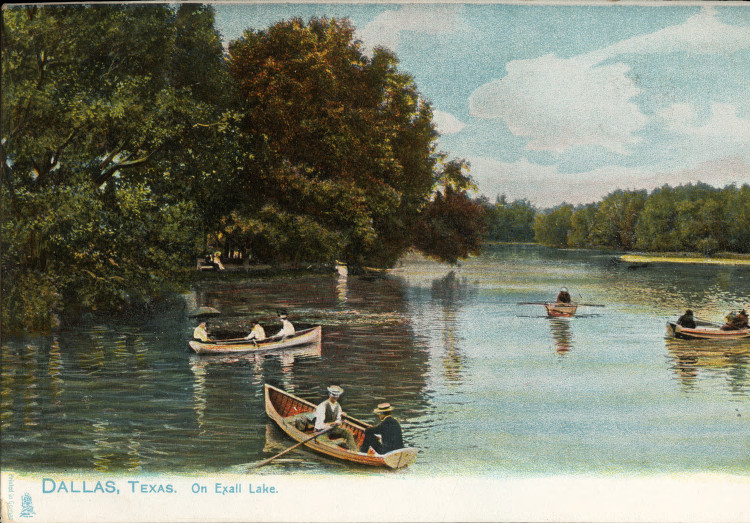
Exall Lake, Dallas, Texas (postcard, c. 1901–1907)

The land now known as Highland Park was bought in 1889 by a group of investors from Philadelphia, Pennsylvania, known as the Philadelphia Place Land Association, for an average price of $377 an acre, with a total of $500,000. Henry Exall, an agent, intended to develop the land along Turtle Creek as "Philadelphia Place", exclusive housing based on parkland areas in Philadelphia. He laid gravel roads, and dammed Turtle Creek, forming Exall Lake, before the Panic of 1893 brought a blow to his fortunes, halting development. In the 1890s, Exall Lake was a common picnic destination for Dallas residents.

In 1906, John S. Armstrong (the former partner of Thomas Marsalis, the developer of Oak Cliff), sold his meatpacking business and invested his money in a portion of the former Philadelphia Place land, to develop it under the name of "Highland Park", choosing this name as it was located on high land that overlooked downtown Dallas. Wilbur David Cook, the landscape designer who had planned Beverly Hills, California, and George E. Kessler, who had previously planned Fair Park and most of downtown Dallas, were hired to design its layout in 1907. Notably, twenty percent of the original land was set aside for parks. When Armstrong died in 1908, his widow and sons-in-law—Edgar Flippen and Hugh Prather continued his work, and Armstrong is considered the founder of Highland Park. A second development in Highland Park was developed in 1910.

In 1913, Highland Park petitioned Dallas to cede itself, but was refused. The 500 Highland Park residents voted to incorporate on November 29, 1913, and incorporation was granted in 1915, when its population was 1,100. The first mayor of Highland Park was W. A. Fraser. A third and fourth development were added to the town in 1915, and 1917, respectively; the final major land development occurred in 1924. In 1919, the city of Dallas sought to annex Highland Park, beginning a lengthy controversy that lasted until 1945; J. W. Bartholow and William Chloupek led the fight to resist the annexation. In 1931, Highland Park Village was constructed, the first shopping center of its kind in the United States.

Because of its location near Dallas, Highland Park had, by the early 1930s, developed a moderately large (8,400) population, with a few businesses. Eventually the school districts and newspapers of Highland Park and University Park were combined. In the 1940s, after the failure to annex Highland Park, Dallas began annexing the land surrounding it. Reaching a population high of just under 13,000 in the late 1950s, Highland Park afterwards grew only by building houses on the remaining vacant lots, and by the destruction of old buildings. Since 1990, Highland Park has maintained strict zoning ordinances.

== Geography ==
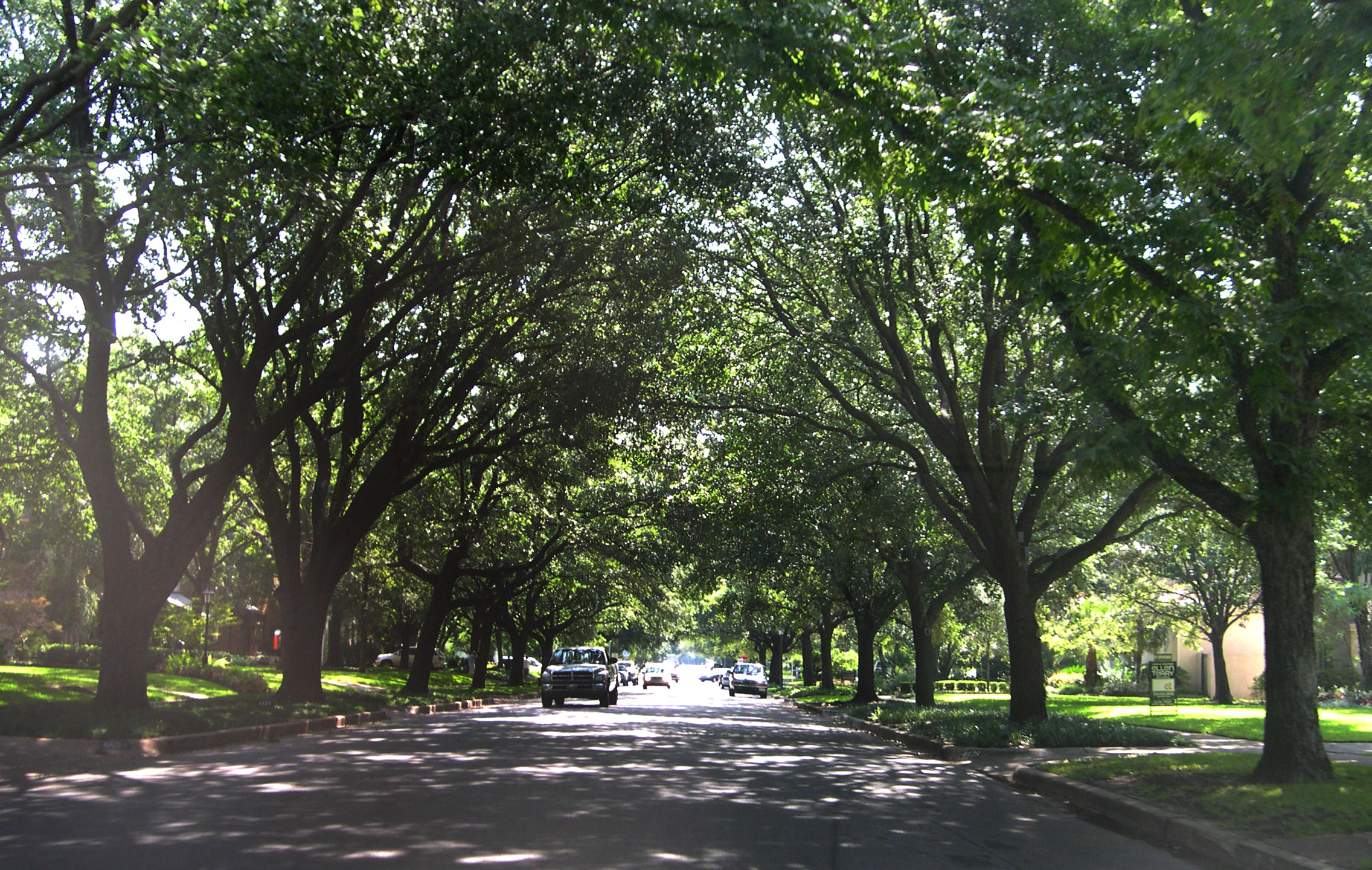
Tree-lined street in Highland Park

According to the United States Census Bureau, the town has a total area of 2.2 square miles (5.7 km^{2}), all land. Highland Park is approximately 3 miles (4.8 km) north of the center of Dallas.

=== Neighborhoods ===
Highland Park was first developed as Old Highland which is made up of the First Section, Second Section, Turtle Creek Acreage, Acreage Section, Third Section, Fourth Section, and the Hackberry Creek Acreage of Old Highland Park. And then the Highland Park Neighborhoods West of Preston were developed.

=== Parks and recreation ===
Dallas Country Club is located here. Highland Park also has a swimming pool, and tennis courts.

=== Climate ===
The climate in this area is characterized by hot, humid summers and generally mild to cool winters. According to the Köppen Climate Classification system, Highland Park has a humid subtropical climate, abbreviated "Cfa" on climate maps.

== Demographics ==
Historical population
Census	Pop.	Note	%±
1920	2,321		—
1930	8,422		262.9%
1940	10,288		22.2%
1950	11,405		10.9%
1960	10,411		−8.7%
1970	10,133		−2.7%
1980	8,909		−12.1%
1990	8,739		−1.9%
2000	8,842		1.2%
2010	8,564		−3.1%
2020	8,864		3.5%
U.S. Decennial Census

Highland Park racial and ethnic composition as of 2020 (NH = Non-Hispanic) (Note: Note: the U.S. Census treats Hispanic/Latino as an ethnic category. This table excludes Latinos from the racial categories and assigns them to a separate category. Hispanics/Latinos can be of any race.)
Race	Number	Percentage
White (NH)	7,553	85.21%
Black or African American (NH)	74	0.83%
Native American or Alaska Native (NH)	2	0.02%
Asian (NH)	405	4.57%
Some Other Race (NH)	18	0.2%
Mixed/Multi-Racial (NH)	347	3.91%
Hispanic or Latino	465	5.25%
Total	8,864	

In 2020, the racial and ethnic makeup was 85.21% non-Hispanic White, 0.83% Black, 0.02% Native American or Alaska Native, 4.57% Asian, 0.2% some other race or ethnicity, 3.91% multiracial, and 5.25% Hispanic or Latino residents of any race.

According to the 2010 U.S. census, there were 8,564 people, 3,411 households, and 2,426 families residing in the town. At the 2020 United States census, there were 8,864 people, 3,398 households, and 2,562 families residing in the town.

Among the population in 2010, the racial makeup was 94.4% White, 0.5% African American, 0.0% Native American, 2.8% Asian, 0.0% Pacific Islander, 1.0% from other races, and 1.1% from two or more races. In addition, Hispanic or Latino residents of any race were 4.0% of the population.

== Arts and culture ==
Highland Park Village Shopping Center

Highland Park Village shopping center is located in the municipality. The Highland Park Centennial Literary Festival is held in the community.

== Government ==
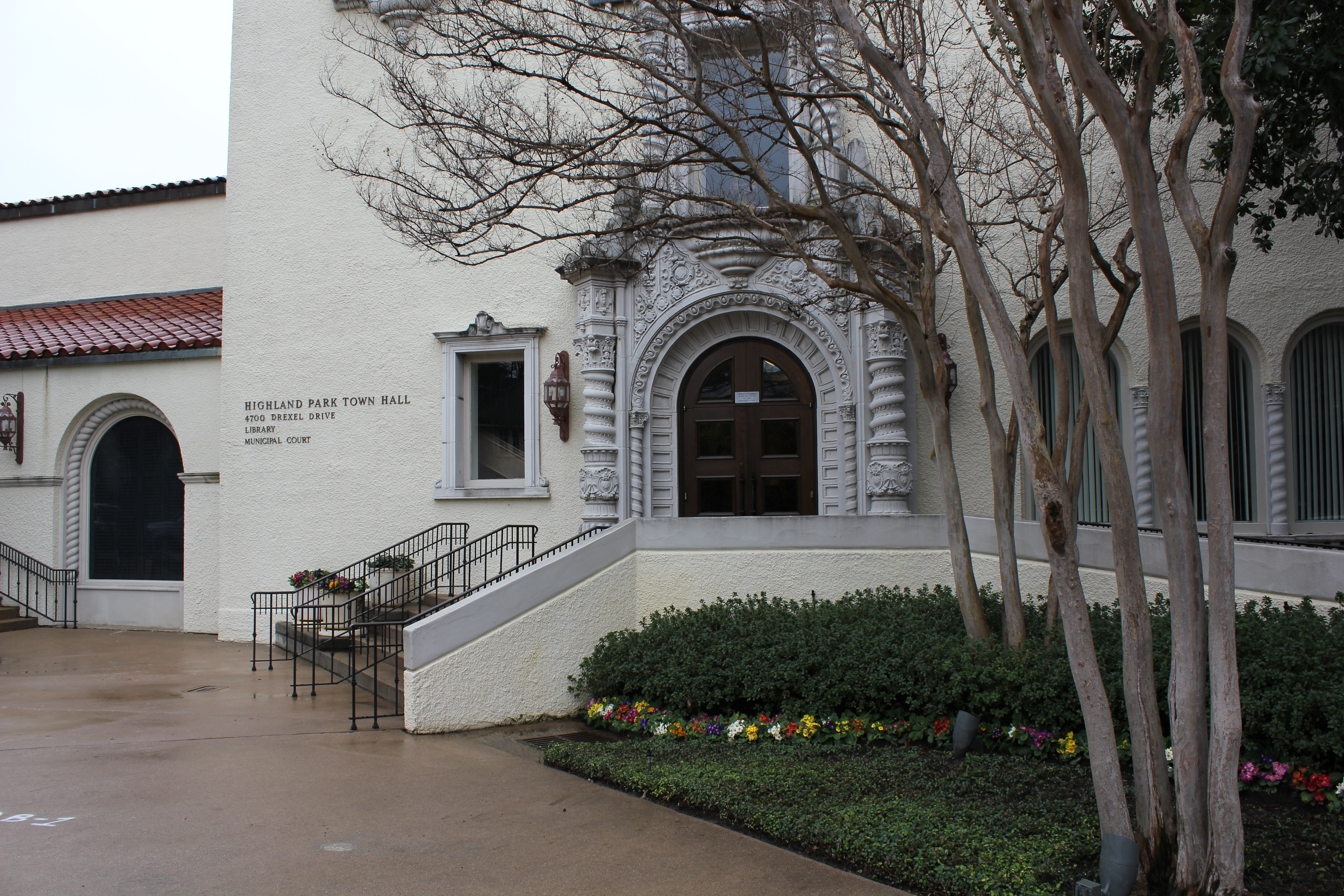
Highland Park Library, Town Hall, and Municipal Court

The Highland Park Town Hall houses municipal services. The Spanish Colonial architecture building was designed by architects Lang & Witchell.

== Education ==
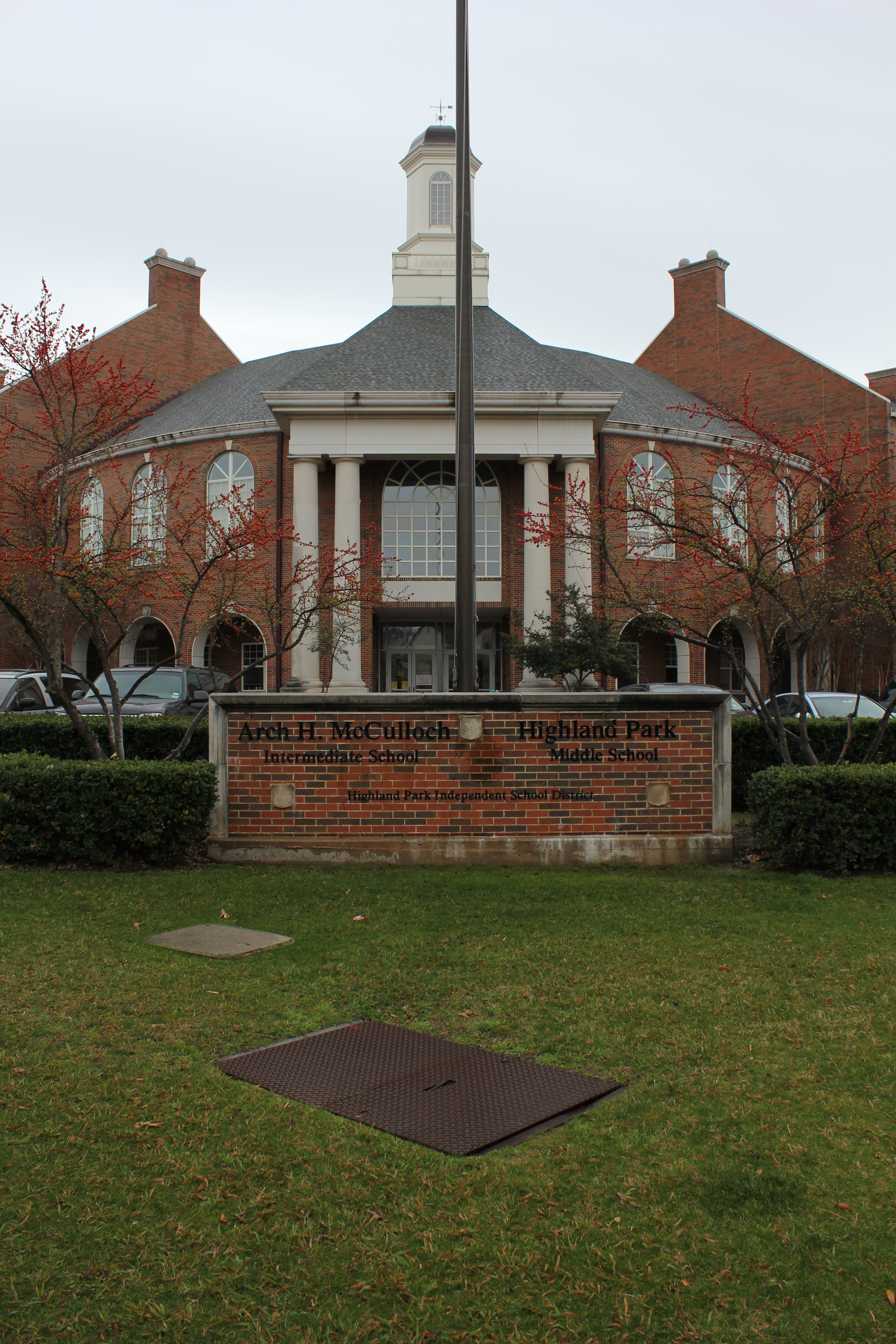
McCulloch Intermediate School and Highland Park Middle School

=== Primary and secondary schools ===
The majority of Highland Park (areas east of Roland Avenue) is within Highland Park Independent School District. The HPISD portion is served by Arch H. McCulloch Middle School and Highland Park Middle School, which share a campus located partially in Highland Park and partially in University Park. Two elementary schools in Highland Park ISD, Armstrong and Bradfield, both in the Highland Park city limits, serve sections of the town of Highland Park.

A portion of Highland Park (areas west of Dallas North Tollway) is within the Dallas Independent School District. DISD schools with attendance boundaries that have western Highland Park include Maple Lawn Elementary School, Rusk Middle School, and North Dallas High School.

== Media ==
- The Dallas Morning News is the Dallas citywide newspaper.

The Highland Park Public Library is adjacent to the Highland Park Town Hall. The library building and art gallery first opened in 1930. As time passed, the art gallery was repurposed as town council chambers and a portion of the library. In 2008 the library underwent major renovations.

=== In popular culture ===
==== Film ====
1996 Wes Anderson film Bottle Rocket featured the Highland Park Soda Fountain, among other locations in Dallas.

==== Television ====
The television show Dallas used Highland Park as a filming location.

The fictional character Claire Underwood from House of Cards (U.S. TV series) was raised in Highland Park.

== Infrastructure ==
The town council authorized the purchasing of a fire engine and the construction of a fire house after the 1913 incorporation. The town hall was built in 1924. During the same year, a new fire station opened next to town hall. The town hall has received several renovations. Connected the town hall is the public safety building. In 2003 a portion of the public safety building was razed, and a new facility was built in its place.

Highland Park employs a public safety department instead of separate police and fire/EMS departments. The public safety officers are certified as firefighters, peace officers, and paramedics. They work 24-hour shifts (with the next two days off), varying their role during the shift. EMS medical direction is provided by the BioTel system through UT-Southwestern Medical School, which provides this service to the majority of fire/EMS departments in Dallas County.

== Notable people ==
- Russell Bentley, pro-Russia figure in the War in Donbas
- Bill Clements, 42nd and 44th Governor of Texas
- Armie Hammer, actor who starred in Call Me By Your Name lived in Highland Park as a child
- Angie Harmon, Rizzoli & Isles actress, was born in Highland Park
- Gino Hernandez, former American professional wrestler
- John Hinckley, Jr., attempted assassin of Ronald Reagan moved to Highland Park at age four
- Clark Hunt, chairman and co-owner of the Kansas City Chiefs of the National Football League (Note: The 4 children of Lamar Hunt (Including Clark) have owned the Chiefs since his death in 2006. Lamar's Widow Norma Hunt previously owned a 50% share in the team until her death in 2023)
- Jerry Jones, owner of the Dallas Cowboys of the National Football League
- Clayton Kershaw, pitcher for the Los Angeles Dodgers of Major League Baseball
- Bobby Layne, quarterback for the Detroit Lions of the National Football League
- Jayne Mansfield, model, actress, mother of actress Mariska Hargitay
- Mariano Martinez, inventor, entrepreneur, restaurateur, and creative artist
- Peter O'Donnell, investor, philanthropist, Republican Party state chairman from 1962 to 1969, reared in Highland Park
- Scottie Scheffler, PGA Tour golfer, winner of four major championships
- Matthew Stafford, quarterback for the Los Angeles Rams of the National Football League
- Marty Turco, Canadian Hockey player who played with the Dallas Stars for 9 seasons, lives in Highland Park
