= Umphrey Lee =

President of Southern Methodist University from 1939 to 1954

1st Chancellor of Southern Methodist University
- In office 1954–1958
- Preceded by: Position Established

4th President of Southern Methodist University
- In office 1939–1954
- Preceded by: Charles Claude Selecman
- Succeeded by: Willis M. Tate

Personal details
- Born: March 23, 1893 Oakland City, Indiana
- Died: June 24, 1958 (aged 65) Dallas, Texas
- Education: Trinity University (BA); Southern Methodist University (MA); Columbia University (PhD)

Umphrey Lee (March 23, 1893 – June 23, 1958) was a Methodist theologian and historian who served as the fourth president of Southern Methodist University from 1939 to 1954. Lee, who had been SMU's first undergraduate student body president, succeeded religious hard-liner C. C. Selecman, and is remembered for fostering an intellectual environment conducive to free research and learning. Along with Dean Merrimon Cuninggim, he was also the driving force behind the effort to begin desegregating SMU in 1952—years before other southern colleges and fellow Methodist universities, Duke University and Emory University.

Lee, a leading scholar on John Wesley and Methodist theology, was a member of the Medieval Academy of America, the American Historical Society, the American Society of Church History, and the Philosophical Society of Texas.

== Early life and education ==
Lee was born in Oakland City, Indiana on March 23, 1893, to Josephus A. and Esther (Davis) Lee. His father was a farmer and Methodist minister; both of his parents were from Kentucky.

Lee attended Daniel Baker College from 1910 to 1912, and received a B.A. from Trinity University in 1914. He received his M.A. from Southern Methodist University two years later, and his PhD from Columbia University in 1931. He worked as a Methodist pastor.

== Career ==
In 1919, Lee accepted the Wesley Bible Chair at the University of Texas. In 1923, he became the pastor of Highland Park Methodist Church, on the Southern Methodist University campus, and taught homiletics. While at Highland Park Methodist Church, now Highland Park United Methodist Church, Dr. Lee instituted a new mission program. Beginning in 1929 at the start of the U.S. Great Depression, Highland Park Methodist Church undertook a new missionary outreach in China, with Rev. Hubert Lafayette Sone as their “Special” representative. “During the four years that the Rev. Hubert L. Sone has been our Special we have come to regard him as much a part of the ministry of this church as our preacher in charge.”, From 1937 to 1939, he was Dean of the School of Religion at Vanderbilt University in Nashville, Tennessee.

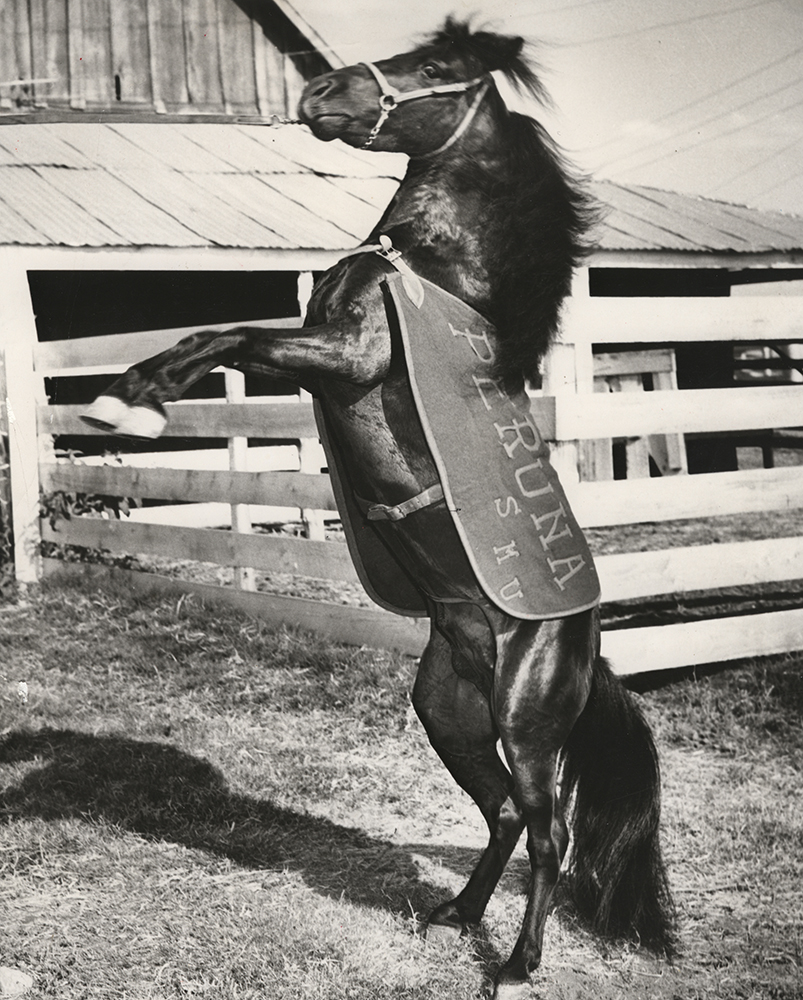
SMU mascot Peruna, sometime during Lee's tenure in the 1940s

=== Southern Methodist University ===
In 1939, Lee was named the fourth president of Southern Methodist University. In his inaugural address, he compared SMU, a university that had only existed for a couple decades, favorably with the country's much older elite institutions:

"We can take advantage of a century of educational experience without having to live through it. If one or the other must be chosen, it is better to have a future than a past."

Lee signaled a new direction for the university in part by identifying and praising faculty for scholarly publications. In his first years, he also called for increasing the library budget, lifted the ban on dances, launched the university's annual funding campaign (led by former SMU president Hiram Boaz), and ended the compulsory chapel attendance.

In 1943, Lee was caught up in a national controversy when the former Mayor of Akron, Ohio, C. Nelson Sparks, published a book featuring a letter that purported to show the SMU president's involvement in a plot by high-level Democrats to make Wendell Willkie the Republican nominee for president in 1944. The anti-Willkie Nelson, supported by Senator William Langer, claimed that the letter was proof that Roosevelt advisor Harry Hopkins had conspired with Lee, and that for his part in the scheme, Lee would receive Hopkins' help when he challenged Tom Connally for his seat in the U.S. Senate. Hopkins and Lee denounced the letter, in which Lee's name was misspelled, as a forgery, leading to the involvement of the Federal Bureau of Investigation. In January 1944, a grand jury indicted George N. Briggs, suspended assistant to Interior Secretary Harold Ickes, for forgery.

After the Second World War, Lee accommodated an influx of GI Bill students with a small village of temporary buildings called "Trailerville." In 1949, Lee brought a chapter of Phi Beta Kappa to campus. That same year, his 10th as president, he was feted by a grateful faculty. Knowing that Lee missed teaching, history professor Herbert Gambrell and Dean Hemphill Hosford surprised the president by adding him to the faculty of the Department of History. That fall, Lee taught a seminar, "Religion in Eighteenth-century England."

In November 1950, Lee approached the Board of Trustees with a proposal to amend the university admissions policy to permit the matriculation of Black students. Whereas similar proposals would be rejected at Duke and Emory during the decade, SMU's board concurred with their president. Lee's motivation for approaching the board appears to have been twofold. On the one hand, he believed that desegregation was inevitable and would cause greater issues if the question of admission were not settled early. On the other, he was keen raise the national profile of the Perkins School of Theology—the SMU college that would be integrated first. In 1951, Perkins had an expensive new campus and Lee offered the deanship to Methodist theologian and Rhodes Scholar Merrimon Cuninggim. Cuninggim replied that he would not accept the position unless SMU had plans to desegregate. Lee is said to have responded, "The way is open now. You can start working on it the day you come." If Lee had made desegregation a goal, Cuninggim made it a reality.

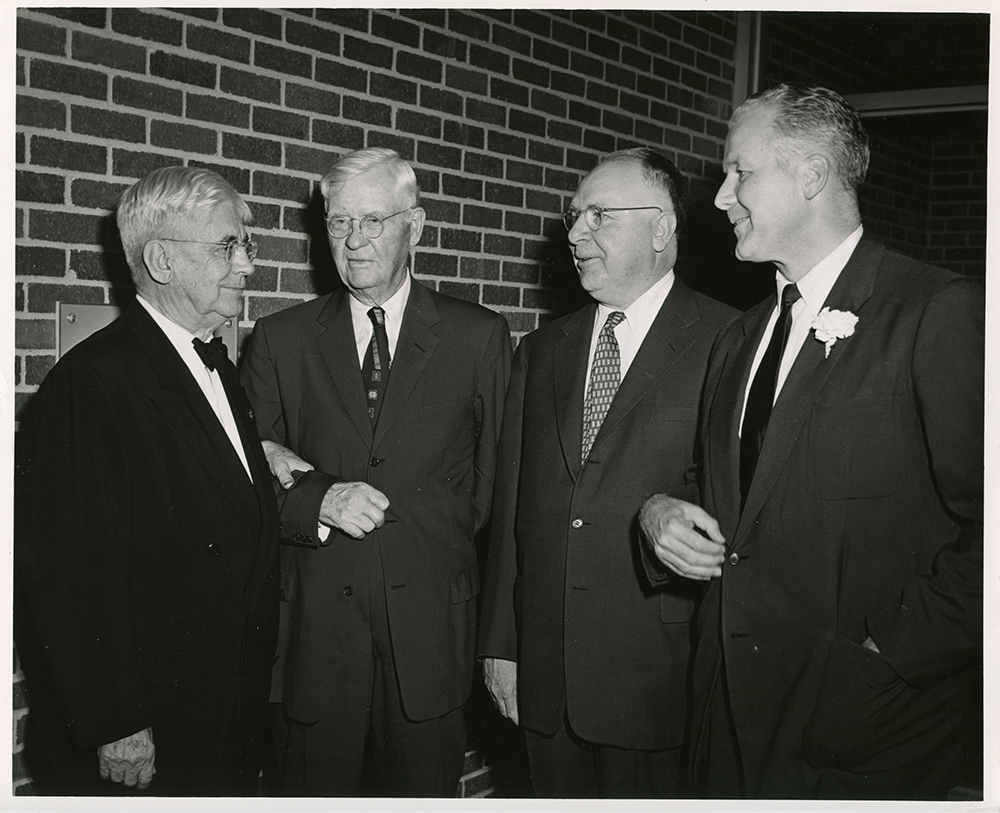
Four SMU Presidents: CC Selecman, Hiram Boaz, Umphrey Lee, and Willis M. Tate

After suffering a heart attack in 1953, Lee resigned the presidency and became the university's first chancellor. He Lee remained an active scholar until the end of this life. In fact, Lee was in his office in SMU's Fondren Library at work on a tenth book, Our Fathers and Us: The Heritage for Methodism, when he suffered a fatal heart attack, dying on the way to the hospital. He was 65.

== Legacy ==
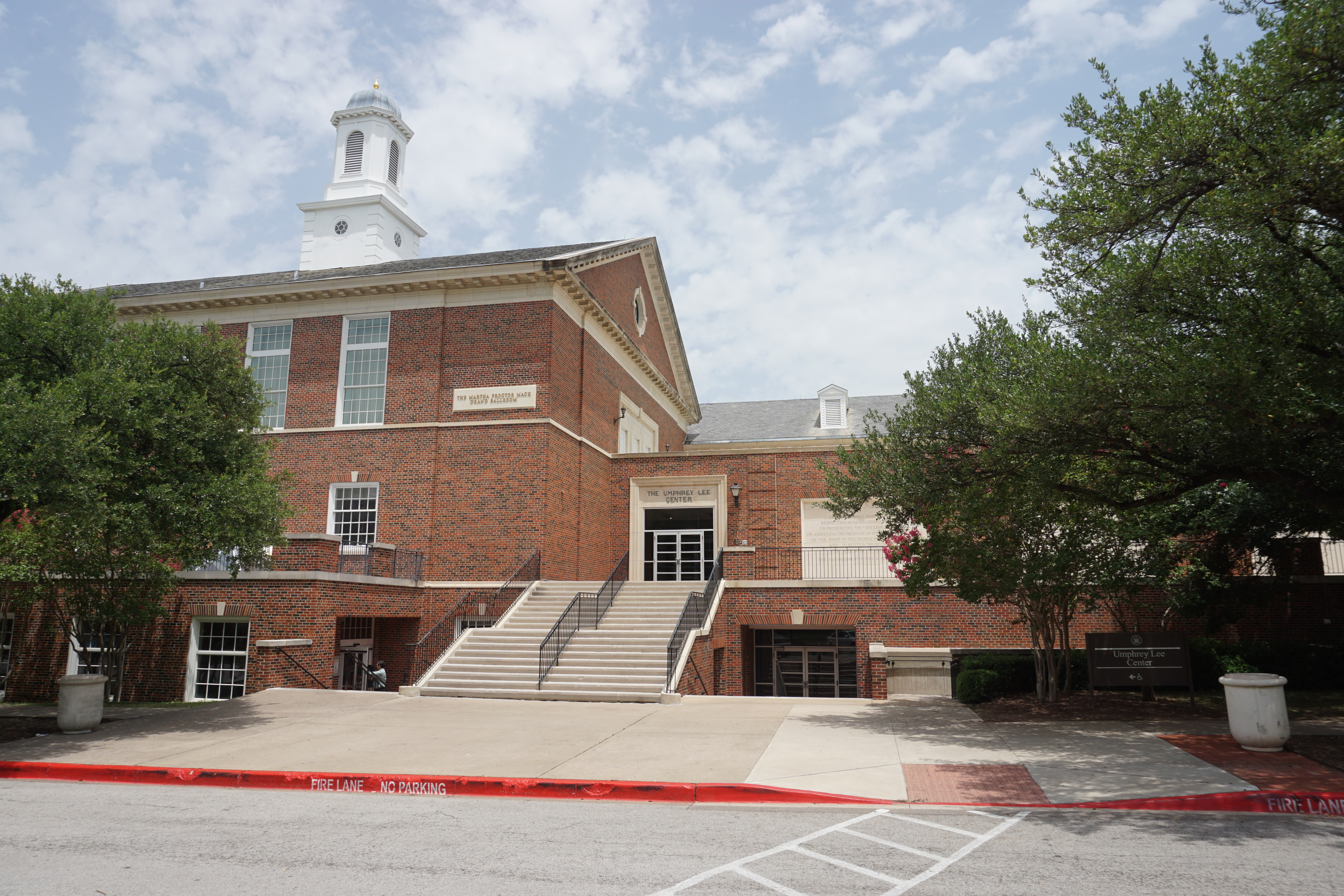
The Umphrey Lee Center at Southern Methodist University

Lee was a national figure in his lifetime. At SMU, he was welcomed with great fanfare after the austere, discordant tenure of CC Selecman. In contrast to his predecessor, Lee was scholarly and personable leader who, like SMU's first president, Robert Stewart Hyer, believed that the university could be far more than a small religious college in Texas. He commended his faculty for their publications, invested heavily in the school of theology, and, most importantly, initiated the process of desegregation—years before other southern universities were legally forced to do so.

At the same time, Lee had his shortcomings. A biographer would write that "Lee's great reluctance to do anything to hurt another person" ultimately "limited his effectiveness as an administrator." This perhaps explains his glaring failure to clamp down on SMU English professor and notorious antisemite John O. Beaty before his conspiratorial writing brought national—and highly negative—attention to SMU. It may also account for his deference to conservative donors when they asked him to stop a small group of liberal faculty from holding a private, off-campus rally for presidential candidate Adlai Stevenson—something Lee's administration sheepishly agreed to do.

== Bibliography ==
- The Lord's Horseman (1928)
- John Wesley and Modern Religion (1936)
- Our Fathers and Us (The Heritage of the Methodists) (1958)
