= Alumni and staff of The Westminster Schools =

== Alumni ==
Notable alumni of Westminster include:

- Margaret Mitchell (Washington Seminary, 1918), author, Gone with the Wind
- Evelyn Greenblatt Howren (North Avenue Presbyterian School, 1934), pioneering woman aviator
- Dorothy Kirby (Washington Seminary, 1938), sportscaster and golf champion
- Lynne Rudder Baker (1962), philosopher, University of Massachusetts Amherst
- Jeff Galloway (1963), Olympic 10k runner 1972
- Taylor Branch (1964), historian and author
- James H. Shepherd, Jr. (1969), chairman of the board, Shepherd Center, the United States' largest catastrophic care hospital
- Daniel R. White (1971), author
- Bill Nuss (1972), producer and writer The A-Team, 21 Jump Street, Pacific Blue, Hawaii Five-O
- Clark Howard (1973), consumer advocate and nationally syndicated radio talk show host
- Helen Ballard (1973), founder and chief executive officer of Ballard Designs; independent director of Oxford Industries
- Michael McChesney (1974), founder and chairman, Security First Network Bank
- Lisa Borders (1975), president of WNBA (Women's National Basketball Association), Atlanta City Council; serves as trustee of school
- Jennifer Chandler (1977), Olympic gold in 3 meter springboard diving, 1976 Summer Olympics
- Hannah Storm (1979), co-host of The Early Show and anchor for ESPN's SportsCenter
- Stan Whitmire (1980), GMA Dove Award-winning pianist and recording artist
- Phillip Alvelda (1982), co-founder, chairman and CEO, MobiTV
- Shuler Hensley (1985), Broadway actor
- Laurie Dhue (1986), Fox News Channel anchor (2000–2008)
- Lauren Myracle (1987), author
- Marc Lipsitch (1987), professor at the Harvard T.H. Chan School of Public Health
- Rob Kutner (1990), writer, The Daily Show
- Brian Baumgartner (1991), actor, The Office
- Ed Helms (1992), actor, The Daily Show, The Office, The Hangover
- Brooke Baldwin (1997), news anchor, CNN
- Sedrick Hodge (1997), NFL linebacker
- Jennifer Stumm (1997), concert violist
- Morgan Jahnig (1998), stand-up bassist, Old Crow Medicine Show
- Kaki King (1998), musician
- Will Welch (1999), editor-in-chief of GQ
- Ansley Cargill (2000), professional tennis player, WTA Tour
- Julian Dorio (2000), musician, The Whigs
- Sarah Hawkins Warren (2000), justice, Supreme Court of Georgia
- Sada Jacobson (2000), 2008 Summer Olympics silver medalist and 2004 Summer Olympics bronze medalist, sabre
- Noah Britton (2001), of Asperger's Are Us
- Parker Gispert (2001), musician, The Whigs
- Charles Judson Wallace (2001), professional basketball player
- Hamilton Jordan, Jr. (2002), musician
- Carter Hawkins (2003), general manager for the Chicago Cubs
- Emily Jacobson (2004), 2004 Olympic fencer
- Gordon Beckham (2005), professional baseball player, 2009 winner of The Sporting News Rookie of the Year Award
- Kathleen Jordan (2007), television writer and creator of Netflix series Teenage Bounty Hunters and The Decameron
- Thomas Fellows (author) (2008), author of Forget Self-Help: Re-Examining the Golden Rule
- Sanjena Sathian (2009), author of Gold Diggers
- Harrison Butker (2013), three-time Super Bowl Champion kicker for Kansas City Chiefs of the National Football League
- Tyler Mitchell (2013), photographer who was the first African-American to shoot the cover of Vogue
- Will Benson (2016), baseball player for Cincinnati Reds of Major League Baseball, selected 14th overall in 2016 MLB draft
- Blake Gillikin (2016), punter for Pennsylvania State University and the Arizona Cardinals of the National Football League
- Arthur Guo (2024), chess prodigy and chess grandmaster

== Faculty ==
- Cynthia Potter, Olympic bronze in 3 meter springboard diving, 1976
- Mike Swider, head football coach at Wheaton College, 1995–2019; coach at Westminster 1978-1985 (including Class AAA State title in 1978 and state playoffs in three other seasons)
