= Thomas Fellows =

Thomas Fellows may refer to:

- Thomas Howard Fellows (1822–1878), English rower and an Australian politician and judge
- Thomas Fellows (author), American author
- Thomas Fellows (activist)

== See also ==
- Thomas Fellowes (disambiguation)
