= Herbert Gambrell =

American historian (1898–1982)

- Born: June 15, 1898; Tyler, Texas
- Died: December 30, 1982 (aged 84); Dallas, Texas
- Resting place: Texas State Cemetery

Academic background
- Education: Southern Methodist University (BA, MA); University of Texas (PhD)

Academic work
- Discipline: History
- Sub-discipline: Texas history
- Institutions: Southern Methodist University

Herbert Pickens Gambrell (July 15, 1898 - December 30, 1982) was an American historian known for his writing on Texas history, as well as his central roles in the Texas Centennial Exposition, Texas Institute of Letters, Texas State Historical Association, Dallas Historical Society, Southwest Review, and Southern Methodist University Press. He was a professor at Southern Methodist University, where he chaired the history department from 1947 to 1964. A colleague would later remember that Gambrell, a popular and influential member of the faculty, was "the chief Wag and Wise Man of SMU for many years."

During his lifetime, Gambrell's writing on Texas and its prominent figures was widely read. His 1948 biography of former Texas president Anson Jones, for instance, reached the New York Times bestseller list and won the Carr P. Collins Texas Book of the Year award. His friend J. Frank Dobie called it "high art." For his work on the French role in Texas history, he was made an Officier d'Académie. In 1982, he was awarded an honorary degree by SMU for being "an indispensable leader in the institution's strivings to achieve its lofty ideals of academic excellence and scholarly accomplishment," as well as "the dean of Texas historians of his generation." He is buried at the Texas State Cemetery in Austin alongside his wife, Virginia Leddy Gambrell.

== Early life and education ==
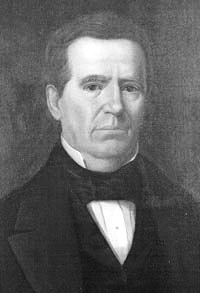
Gambrell's biography of Texas president Anson Jones brought him to national attention

Gambrell was born on July 15, 1989 in Tyler, Texas. His parents were Victoria (Pickens) and Joel Halbert Gambrell, a Baptist minister. Gambrell attended Dallas High School, graduating in 1915. He enrolled at Baylor University the following year and was elected class president in 1920. Gambrell had not completed his degree, however, and transferred to Southern Methodist University, receiving a BA in 1921 and MA in 1923. More than twenty years later, he would complete his PhD at the University of Texas in 1946. His dissertation, "A Life of Anson Jones," would form the basis for his 1948 biography, Anson Jones: The Last President of Texas.

== Career ==
Gambrell began teaching at Southern Methodist University in 1923. The following year he was recruited by Jay B. Hubbell to join the newly-acquired Southwest Review as the journal's first managing editor. He would remain in that position from 1924 to 1927.

During the 1920s, Gambrell was part of a clique of young faculty who opposed the draconian policies of then-president C.C. Selecman. They called themselves the "Hotheads." Some of them, including the future director of the Dallas Museum of Art Jerry Bywaters and future SMU provost Hemphill Hosford, would also form a spoof group called "Martha Sumner University"—the name given to SMU in Charles W. Ferguson's 1929 satirical novel Pigskin. Gambrell and other faculty members would organize to try and remove Selecman in 1932, when the president—who was known for firing professors with no due process—asked faculty to make a "voluntary" contribution to the university to cover a budgetary shortfall. The faculty failed in their aims but Selecman was chastened somewhat.

Gambrell's historical exhibitions were displayed at Fark Park's Centennial Hall

1936 brought the Texas Centennial Exposition to Dallas. Gambrell was given responsibility for the historical exhibitions in Centennial Hall. Gambrell was flooded by offers from private collectors to show their artifacts—including Santa Anna's last will and testament and documents signed by King Ferdinand and Queen Isabella. The following year, he managed the historical exhibitions for the less successful Greater Texas & Pan-American Exposition.

Gambrell served as President of the Texas State Historical Association between 1951 and 1953.

Gambrell retired in 1964. In the 1970s, he reconvened Martha Sumner University at his house for the first time since 1959. There, Gambrell, the "chancellor" of MSU, chose SMU professor Marshall Terry as his successor, gave him his mock regalia, and asked him to keep the subversive group going. Terry would not succeed.

== Legacy ==
Gambrell, a product of SMU in its earliest days, became a pillar of the university for four decades. By all accounts, the six-foot-six-inch tall historian was almost a model faculty member: a charismatic teacher, serious scholar, courageous peer, and good-humored raconteur. One former colleague remembered him as one of the "enlightened conservatives" at SMU when Dallas was in the throes of McCarthyism. His letters and reminisces, held in the archives of SMU and the Dallas Historical Society, have proven invaluable for historians of the university's first fifty years.

Today, Gambrell is the namesake of both the "Gambrell Motion"—an accelerated recognition of degree candidates in the Dedman College of Humanities and Sciences—and the annual Herbert Pickens Gambrell Award for Outstanding Academic Achievement, given to history students at SMU.

== Writings ==
- A Social and Political History of Texas (1932), co-author
- Mirabeau Bonaparte Lamar: Troubadour and Crusader (1934)
- Anson Jones: The Last President of Texas
- A Pictorial History of Texas
