= Oakbrook Center =

Shopping center in Oak Brook, Illinois

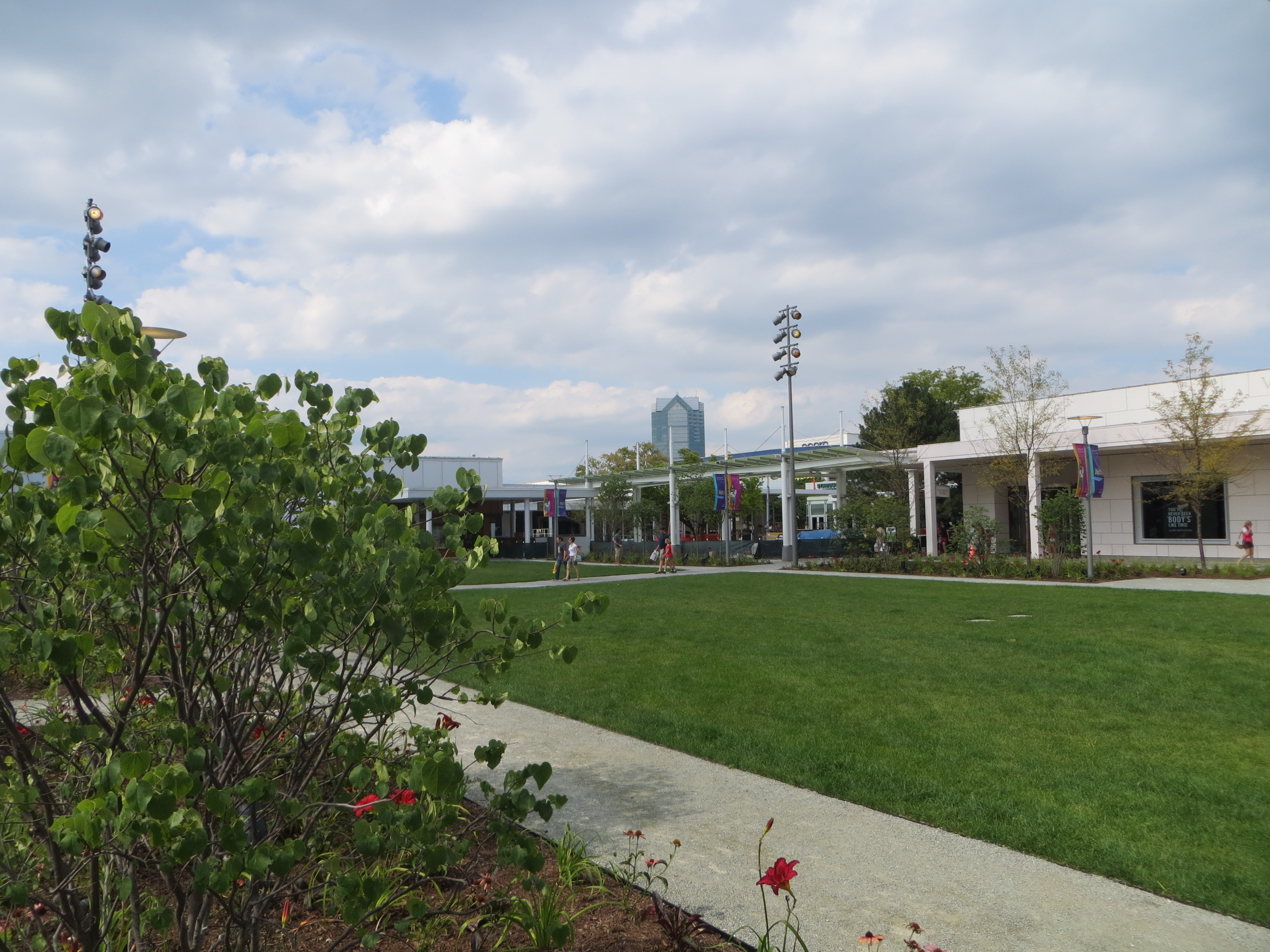
- View of the grassy mall center
- Location: Oak Brook, Illinois, United States
- Coordinates: 41°51′2″N 87°57′11″W
- Address: 100 Oakbrook Center
- Opened: 1962; 64 years ago
- Developer: Philip M. Klutznick
- Manager: GGP
- Owner: GGP and CalPERS
- Architect: Richard Marsh Bennett of Loebl, Schlossman and Bennett
- Num. of stores: 175
- Num. of anchor tenants: 3
- Floor area: 2,018,000 sq ft (187,500 m^{2})
- Floors: 3 (4 in Macy’s)
- Public transit: Pace
- Website: oakbrookcenter.com

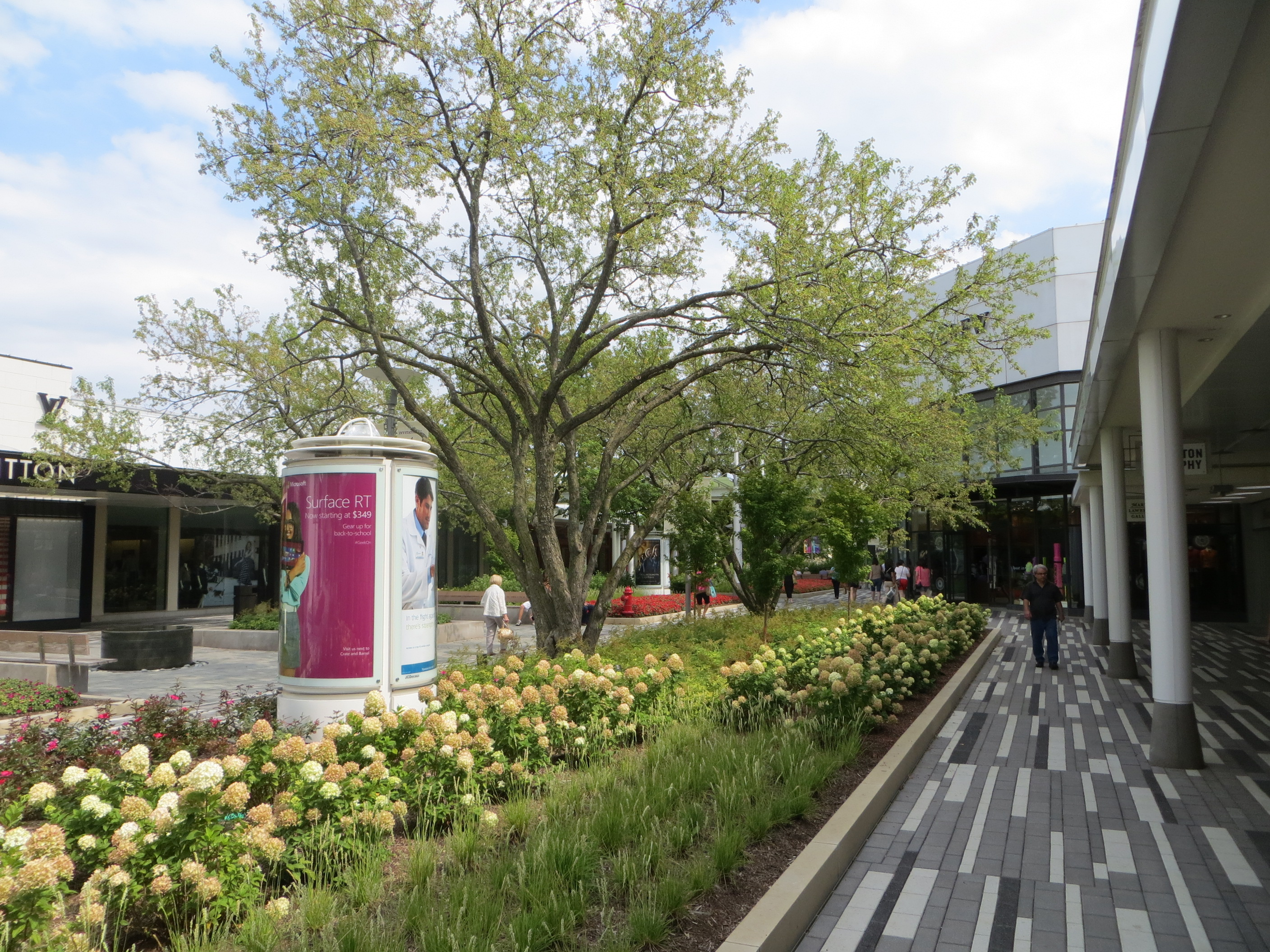
The Louis Vuitton store can be seen on the left.

Oakbrook Center is a shopping center established in 1962 and in Oak Brook, Illinois near Interstate 88 and Route 83. It is the second largest shopping center in the Chicago metropolitan area by gross leasable area, only surpassed by Woodfield Mall in Schaumburg, Illinois. The mall has retail anchor tenants including Macy's, Nordstrom, and Neiman Marcus, and specialty retailers such as Apple, Lucid, Google, Altar'd State, Tory Burch, Pottery Barn, Arc'teryx, Golden Goose, Fabletics, Rhone, and Warby Parker.

== History ==
Oakbrook Center, which was originally to be named Oakbrook Terrace (but the name was changed when a town near the mall took that name), opened in 1962 with Sears and Marshall Field's, as well as a Jewel Food Store. Bonwit Teller was later added, as was Lord & Taylor in 1973. I. Magnin, Saks Fifth Avenue, and Neiman Marcus joined the center in a 1981-1982 expansion that doubled the physical size of the center with a new southeast court.

On Christmas Day 1964, a single-screen movie theater operated by Balaban & Katz Corporation was opened at the Oakbrook Center near Saks Fifth Avenue. On its twenty-third year of operation in 1987, the single screen theater was split into four screens when Cineplex Odeon Corporation took it over. Cineplex Odeon also added another four screens, topped by additional retail (including a bookstore), near the Saks Fifth Avenue anchor; these screens closed in 2001 and then reopened in 2018. Bonwit Teller closed their location in 1990, while I. Magnin was shuttered in January 1991, with its former site subdivided in 1994 for specialty stores, including Eddie Bauer and Tiffany & Company. In 1991, a new two-story, open-air addition opened northeast of Sears. Built on top of a parking garage, it added 210,000 sq ft (20,000 m^{2}) of mall retail and a 220,000 sq ft (20,000 m^{2}) Nordstrom which opened on April 5 that same year. Maggiano's Little Italy opened that same year. Corner Bakery Cafe opened to customers on December 3, 1992. In 1998, Wildfire Restaurant opened.

The Rouse Company acquired the majority of Urban Retail Properties/Rodamco North America's assets, including Oakbrook Center, in May 2002 following a joint venture with Simon Property Group and Westfield Group.

Saks Fifth Avenue closed its store in 2002 and sold the location to Federated Department Stores, which used the site to open a 90,000-square-foot, three-story Bloomingdale's Home store on September 12, 2003. Cheesecake Factory opened in August 2004. Marshall Field's adopted the Macy's name on September 8, 2006, with Macy's buying the parent company. On November 12, 2008, Barnes & Noble opened. A year later, in 2009, American Apparel (which closed in 2017) opened. In 2010, Gibson's Bar and Steakhouse opened across the street from the mall. Pandora opened its doors in 2011.

Pinstripes opened as a stand-alone location in the mall parking lot in 2012. In November 2013, Perry's Steakhouse opened in the former basement level of Neiman Marcus.

On January 4, 2012, Bloomingdale's announced that it would shutter its Oakbrook Home store by March of the year. Two years later in 2014, that structure was reconstructed to feature six inline tenants: The Container Store on the first level; Lululemon Athletica, Tommy Bahama, Hugo Boss, and Aritzia on the second level.

In August 2014, Le Méridien opened a 172 guest-room hotel in a former Renaissance Hotel, which was originally a Stouffer Hotel. This is their first in the state of Illinois.

On October 13, 2016, AMC Theatres opened a new 12-screen cinema in a remodeled section of the Nordstrom wing; this remodeling also included a new food hall named "The District."

On June 20, 2017, Sears announced that its Oakbrook Center outpost would be reconstructed to feature additional stores. It shuttered in September 2017 and reopened on October 5, 2018, in a smaller new store format on the first level of the mall. Ballard Designs and L.L. Bean, opened in the center in Fall 2018.

In February 2018, Lord & Taylor announced they would close their anchor store.

On April 22, 2019, it was announced Sears would close its reduced anchor store.

Puttshack opened on November 3, 2021.

In September 2021, a three-story Restoration Hardware store opened, featuring a restaurant and winery on its top floor.

Joss & Main opened in 2023.
