= Henry Nash Smith =

American literary critic

- Born: September 29, 1906; Dallas, Texas
- Died: June 6, 1986 (aged 79); Elko, Nevada
- Spouse: Elinor Lucas
- Children: 3

Academic background
- Education: Southern Methodist University (BA); Harvard University (MFA, PhD)

Academic work
- Discipline: English
- Sub-discipline: American Studies
- Institutions: Southern Methodist University; University of Texas at Austin; University of Minnesota; University of California, Berkeley
- Notable works: Virgin Land: The American West as Symbol and Myth, 1950 (reprint Vintage Books, 1957; Harvard University Press, 1970)

Henry Nash Smith (September 29, 1906 – June 6, 1986) was a scholar of American culture and literature. He is recognized as one of the founders of the academic discipline American studies. He was also a noted Mark Twain scholar, and the curator of the Mark Twain Papers. The Handbook of Texas reported that an uncle encouraged Smith to read at an early age, and that the boy developed an interest in the works of Rudyard Kipling, Robert L. Stevenson and Mark Twain.

== Early life and education ==
Smith was born in Dallas, Texas to a father, an accountant who was a native of Kentucky, and a mother who was a native of Alabama. In 1922, he enrolled in Southern Methodist University (SMU), where he studied under John Hathaway McGinnis. In 1926, Smith received his Bachelor's degree at SMU, then enrolled at Harvard University, where he earned the Master of Fine Arts degree.

== Academic career ==
=== Southern Methodist University ===
Smith, who did not yet have a PhD, returned to Southern Methodist University in 1927 and began teaching in the English Department. He was also appointed as editor of the Southwest Review, a position he held until 1937. Smith, who devoted himself almost entirely to the Review during its difficult years in the 1930s, is largely credited with the publication's survival. He would remember his experience on the Review as "a sort of super-graduate seminar, an Institute of Higher Studies."

At the same time, his editorial work almost proved to be the end of his promising academic career: in 1932, Smith wrote the preface to William Faulkner's short story "Miss Zilphia Gant" and published it through the Book Club of Texas. One of Smith's colleagues, John O. Beaty, was scandalized and demanded that SMU president C. C. Selecman fire Smith. Though encouraged by the president to resign, Smith refused to do so. Lon Tinkle, Smith's friend and colleague, offered to give Smith his comparative literature courses, and so to appease Beaty, Selecman moved Smith the Comparative Literature department.

In 1937, Smith enrolled again at Harvard to complete a doctorate. He received his PhD in 1940 and returned to teaching at SMU, where he developed a new program, "History of American Civilization." He lasted only a year in Dallas before deciding to leave for a faculty position at the University of Texas at Austin.

=== University of Texas at Austin ===
Smith joined the University of Texas a professor of both American history and English. He was reportedly happy with his work, his colleagues and his students. In 1944, however, university president Homer P. Rainey was fired after protesting against the board's weakening of academic freedom, and Smith was drawn into the controversy when he wrote a paper for the Students Association, "The Controversy at the University of Texas, 1939–1945." Though Smith did not formally leave the University of Texas until 1947, he departed Austin in 1945 for a temporary teaching position at Harvard.

=== University of Minnesota ===
Smith accepted a position as professor of English at the University of Minnesota in 1947, where he joined the American Studies program. During this time, Smith would continue to engage with questions of academic freedom, writing an essay, "Legislatures, Communists and State Universities," that argued against firing faculty members who had become members of the communist party.

=== University of California, Berkeley ===
The Smith family left Minneapolis in 1953, when Henry accepted a position at the University of California, Berkeley. He served as chairman of the Berkeley English Department from 1957 to 1961, and also served a term as national president of the Modern Language Association in 1969. A decade after he moved to Berkeley, Smith immersed himself in a series of political actions, including the Free Speech movement and the anti-Vietnam war protests. He retired from Berkeley in 1974.

== Virgin Land ==
Smith's most well-known work is Virgin Land: The American West as Symbol and Myth. Published in 1950, the book gave its name to the Myth and Symbol School, and became a foundational text for the interdisciplinary field of American Studies. The book's topic was the collective perception of the 19th-century American West. Smith used sources such as dime novels and other items of popular culture. He was associated with Leo Marx and John William Ward.

== Personal life and death ==
Smith married Elinor Lucas in 1956. They had three children: Harriet Elinor Smith, Janet Carol Smith, and Mayne Smith.

Smith died at the age of 79 on June 6, 1986, following an automobile accident on May 30, 1986, near Elko, Nevada.

== Awards and honors ==
- 1981 elected member of the American Philosophical Society
- 1974 Guggenheim Fellowship - Awarded to individuals who have already demonstrated exceptional capacity for productive scholarship or exceptional creative ability in the arts.]
- 1961 elected member of the American Academy of Arts and Sciences
- 1951 Bancroft Prize
- 1950 John H. Dunning prize - Prize established in 1929 by the American Historical Association for the best book in history related to the United States. Smith was the 12th author to receive this biennial award.

== Works ==
- Virgin Land: The American West as Symbol and Myth, 1950 (reprint Vintage Books, 1957; Harvard University Press, 1970, ISBN 978-0-674-93955-4)
- Mark Twain of the Enterprise, 1957
- Mark Twain: The Development of a Writer, Belknap Press, 1962
- Mark Twain's Fable of Progress: Political and Economic Ideas in A Connecticut Yankee, Rutgers University Press, 1964
- Popular Culture and Industrialism, 1865-1890, 1967
- Democracy and the Novel, 1978
