= Liza Wieland =

American novelist

Liza Wieland (born 1960) is an American novelist, short story writer and poet. Wieland has received fellowships from the National Endowment for the Arts, the Christopher Isherwood Foundation, and the North Carolina Arts Council, and her work has been awarded two Pushcart Prizes. Her novel A Watch of Nightingales won the 2008 Michigan Literary Fiction Award. Wieland earned her B.A. in English from Harvard and her M.A. and Ph.D. from Columbia University. She graduated high school in 1978 from The Lovett School in Atlanta. She has taught at Colorado College and California State University-Fresno, and has been a Professor of English at East Carolina University since 2007. She is married to Daniel Stanford.

== Works ==
=== Novels ===
- Land of Enchantment. Syracuse: SU P, 2015. ISBN 978-0-81561-046-5
- A Watch of Nightingales. Ann Arbor: U of Michigan P, 2009. ISBN 978-0-472-11672-0. The book gives an in-depth view of relationship dynamics as they change over time, especially emphasizing how they are culturally influenced. Wieland uses the Sikh culture to develop certain characters and weave an intricate plot. Each character, who is able to triumph over calamitous circumstances and find beauty through their process of healing, symbolizes a nightingale—because nightingales only sing at night, after sunset and at the end of the day.
- Bombshell. Dallas: SMU P, 2001. ISBN 978-0-87074-462-4
- The Names of the Lost. Dallas: SMU P, 1992. ISBN 978-0-87074-337-5

=== Stories ===
- Quickening. Dallas: SMU P, 2011. ISBN 978-0-87074-564-5
- You Can Sleep While I Drive. Dallas: SMU P, 1999. ISBN 978-0-87074-441-9
- Discovering America. New York: Random House, 1994. ISBN 978-0-679-42459-8

=== Poetry ===
- Near Alcatraz. Cincinnati: Cherry Grove, 2005. ISBN 978-1-932339-74-1
