= George E. Stratemeyer =

US Air Force general (1890–1969)

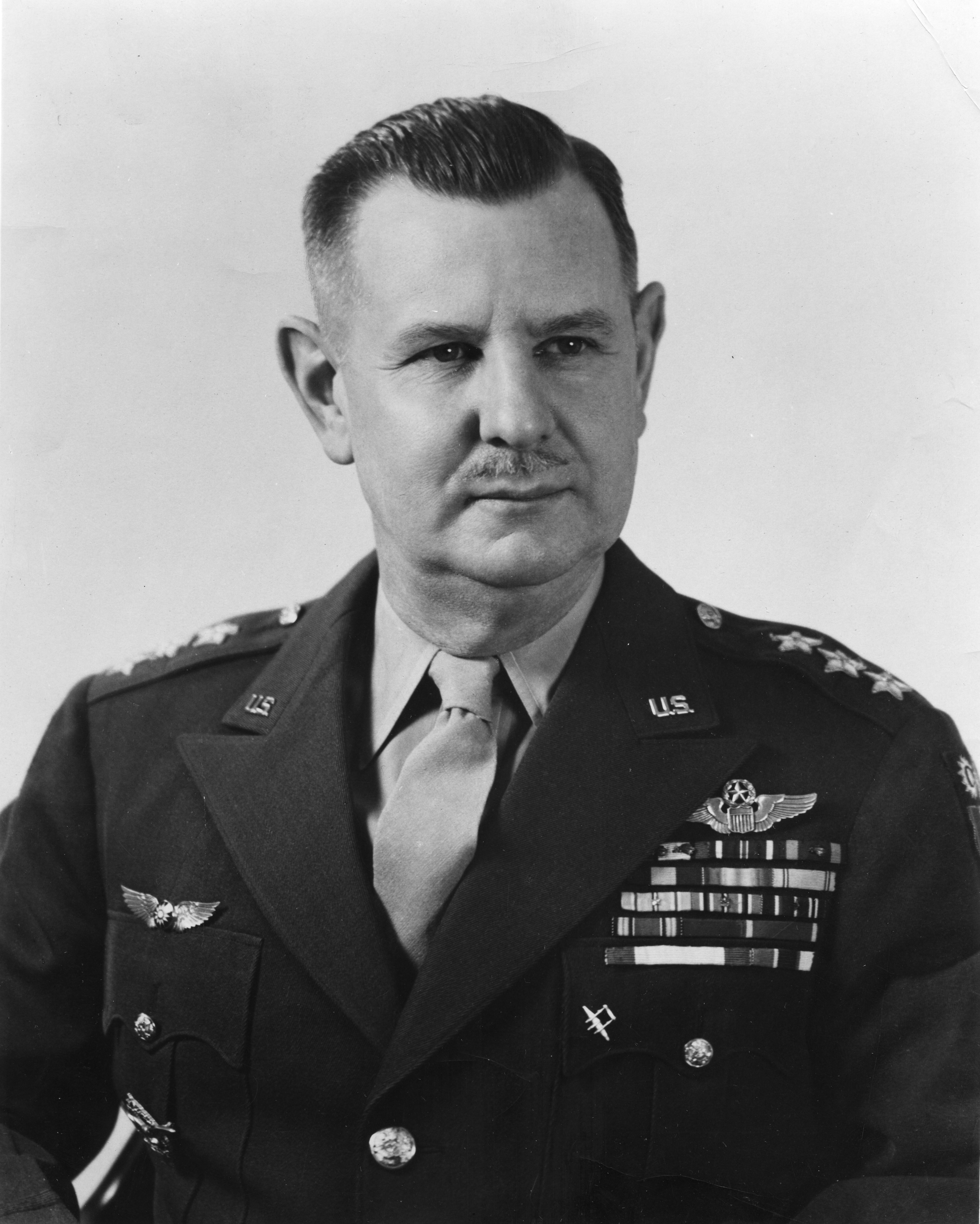
- Born: 24 November 1890; Cincinnati, Ohio, U.S.
- Died: 9 August 1969 (aged 78); Winter Park, Florida, U.S.
- Burial place: United States Air Force Academy Cemetery
- Military career
- Allegiance: United States
- Branch: United States Army; United States Air Force
- Service years: 1915–1952
- Rank: Lieutenant General
- Commands: Far East Air Forces; Continental Air Command; Air Defense Command; Eastern Air Command, South East Asia Command; 7th Bomb Group
- Conflicts: World War II; Korean War
- Awards: Distinguished Service Cross; Army Distinguished Service Medal (4); Distinguished Flying Cross; Air Medal (2)

Lieutenant General George Edward Stratemeyer (24 November 1890 – 9 August 1969) was a senior commander in the United States Air Force. He held senior command appointments in the China Burma India Theater of World War II and was Far East Air Forces commander during the first year of the Korean War.

== Early career ==
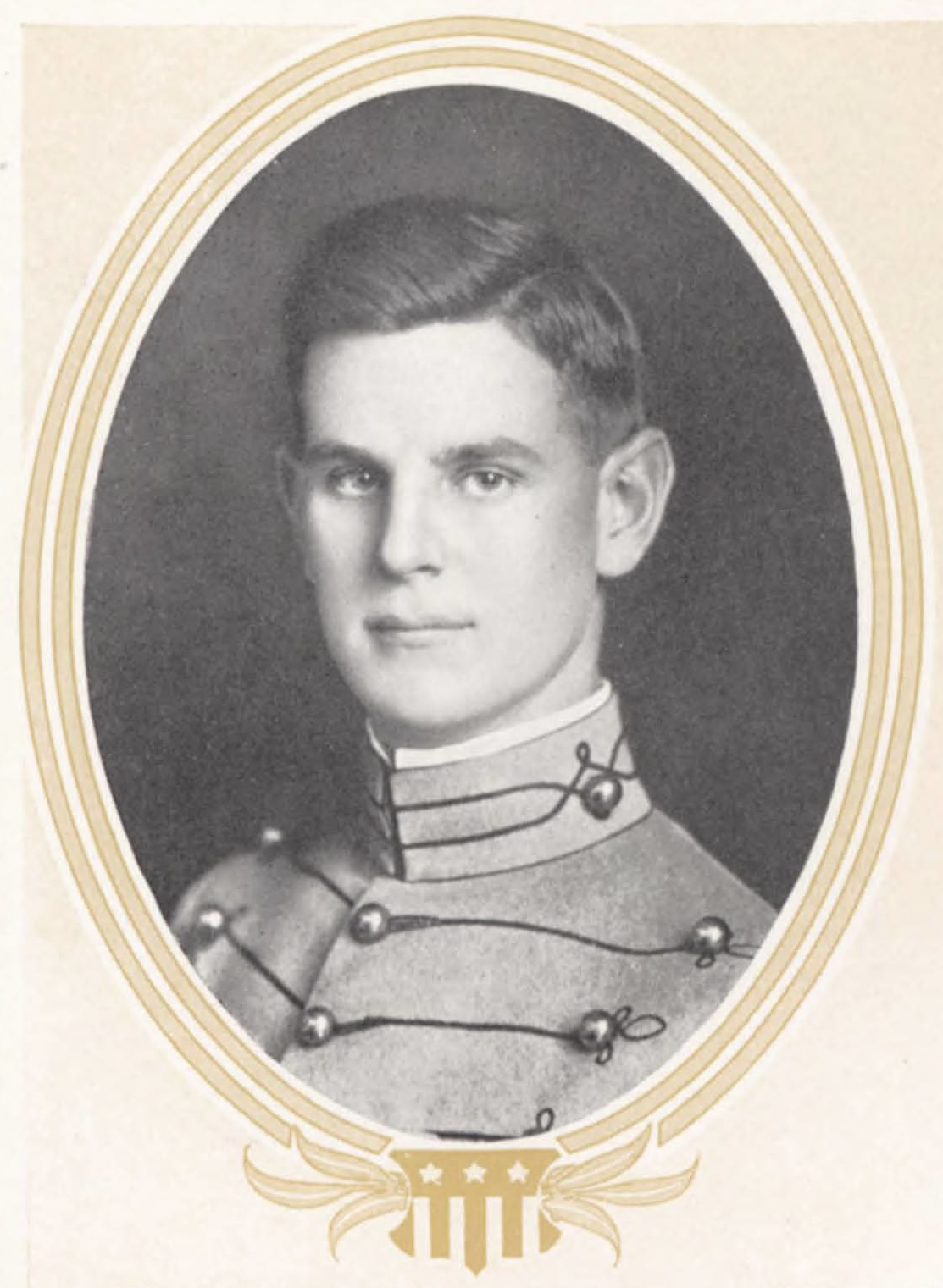
At West Point in 1915

Stratemeyer was born in Cincinnati, Ohio, in 1890. He graduated from the United States Military Academy in June 1915 ("the class the stars fell on") as a second lieutenant of Infantry. He served with the 7th and 34th Infantry regiments in Texas and Arizona until September 1916 when he was detailed to the Aviation Section, U.S. Signal Corps, for flying training at Rockwell Field, San Diego, California. Stratemeyer became a first lieutenant in June 1916. He became commanding officer of the United States Army Air Service Flying and Technical Schools at Kelly Field, Texas in May 1917. He became a captain in August 1917, assigned as school commandant of the School of Military Aeronautics Division ground school at Ohio State University, and later commanding officer of Chanute Field, Illinois. Stratemeyer was promoted to major in August 1918. With official transfer to the Air Corps from the Infantry in 1920 he went to Luke Field, Hawaii as commanding officer of the 10th Air Park.

Stratemeyer returned to West Point in August 1924 as instructor in tactics. He graduated from the Air Corps Tactical School at Langley Field, Virginia, in June 1930 and from the Command and General Staff School at Fort Leavenworth, Kansas, in 1932. He remained at Leavenworth as an instructor for the next four years. Stratemeyer was promoted to lieutenant colonel in June 1936 and assigned to command the 7th Bomb Group at Hamilton Field, California. He graduated from the Army War College in 1939 and went to the office of the Chief of the United States Army Air Corps as head of the Training and Operations Division, with promotion to colonel in March 1940.

A year later Stratemeyer became executive officer to General Henry H. Arnold, the chief of the Air Corps, and in August he was promoted to brigadier general. Stratemeyer commanded the Southeast Air Corps Training Center at Maxwell Field, Alabama, for five months and returned to Washington in June 1942 as chief of Air Staff for General Arnold. He had been promoted to major general in February 1942.

== World War II ==
Stratemeyer went to the China Burma India Theater in mid-1943, appointed Commanding General of the Army Air Forces' India-Burma Sector, deputy Air Commander Southeast Asia, and commander of the Eastern Air Command, South East Asia Command (SEAC). Although officially air advisor to General Joseph Stilwell, his status was comparable to that of Stilwell.

Part of Stratemeyer's command, the Tenth Air Force, had been integrated with the RAF Third Tactical Air Force in India in December 1943 and was operating under Lord Louis Mountbatten, Supreme Allied Commander of SEAC. Another part of it, the Fourteenth Air Force in China, was under the jurisdiction of Generalissimo Chiang Kai-shek as commander of the China Theater. And although the India-China Wing, Air Transport Command received its allocations of tonnage requirements for the Hump airlift from Stratemeyer as Stilwell's deputy, control of ICWATC resided with Headquarters ATC, in Washington. One of Stratemeyer's favorite cartoons showed him sitting at his desk surrounded by pictures of his eight bosses (Stilwell, Mountbatten, General George C. Marshall, Chiang, Arnold, Royal Air Force Air Marshal Sir Richard Peirse, Major General Daniel I. Sultan, and FDR), all of whom could give him orders in one or another of his capacities.

Stratemeyer was promoted to lieutenant general in May 1945 and from April 1944 until March 1946 was commander of the Army Air Forces in the China Theater with headquarters at Chongqing. Stratemeyer was a major figure in the retaliatory maneuvering after Stilwell's recall to force General Claire Chennault out as commander of the 14th Air Force, headquartered in Kunming.

After the war, Stratemeyer commanded the Air Defense Command at Mitchel Field, New York, and the Continental Air Command, which was organized there in November 1948. At both positions, Stratemeyer tried to improve America's warning system.

== Korean War ==
Stratemeyer went to Tokyo in April 1949 as commanding general of Far East Air Forces, which he led through the first year of the Korean War. His units responded rapidly to the North Koreans' invasion of the South and provided South Korea and General Douglas MacArthur with the vital air arm. General Stratemeyer had a serious heart attack in Tokyo in May 1951 and was confined to the Air Force hospital at nearby Tachikawa Air Base.

Stratemeyer retired on 31 January 1952. He died in Winter Park, Florida on 9 August 1969.

== Reputed Antisemitism ==
In the mid-1950s, Stratemeyer endorsed John O. Beaty's Iron Curtain Over America, in which Beaty characterized American Jews as "obsessed with its own objectives, which are not those of Western civilization," and blamed Jews for communism and World War II. He confirmed his endorsement after the Anti-Defamation League reported that a flyer had been distributed by the Christian Nationalist Crusade, using the general's name and photograph as having endorsed the book.

== Decorations ==
Stratemeyer awards include the Distinguished Service Cross, Distinguished Service Medal with three oak leaf clusters; Distinguished Flying Cross; Air Medal with oak leaf cluster; Mexican Border Service Medal; World War I Victory Medal; American Defense Service Medal; Asiatic-Pacific Campaign Medal with five service stars; European-African-Middle Eastern Campaign Medal with service star; American Campaign Medal with service star; World War II Victory Medal; National Defense Service Medal; Korean Service Medal with four service stars; Knight Commander of the Order of the British Empire; British Companion of the Order of the Bath; Ho-Tu Medal of Chinese Air Force; Tashou Cloud Banner (Chinese); Chinese Special; Polish Order of Polonia Restituta Commander's Cross; United Nations Service Medal Korea and Pilot's badges from China and Yugoslavia.

== Effective dates of promotion ==
Insignia	Rank	Date
	Lieutenant general	May 28, 1945
	Major general	February 16, 1942
	Brigadier general	August 4, 1941
	Colonel	March 1, 1940
	Lieutenant colonel	January 1, 1937
	Major	August 20, 1920
	Captain	May 15, 1917
	First lieutenant	July 1, 1916
	Second lieutenant	June 12, 1915
