= Southwest Review =

- Discipline: Literary journal
- Language: English
- Edited by: Greg Brownderville

Publication details
- Former name: Texas Review (1915–1924)
- History: 1915–present
- Publisher: Southern Methodist University (United States)
- Frequency: Quarterly

Standard abbreviations
- ISO 4: Southwest Rev.

Indexing
- ISSN: 0038-4712
- JSTOR: southwestreview

Links
- Journal homepage

The Southwest Review is a literary journal published quarterly at Southern Methodist University campus in Dallas, Texas. Founded in 1915 as the Texas Review, it is the third oldest literary quarterly in the United States. The current editor-in-chief is Greg Brownderville.

The Southwest Review has featured work by many well-known contributors, including: Quentin Bell, Amy Clampitt, Margaret Drabble, Natalia Ginzburg, James Merrill, Iris Murdoch, Howard Nemerov, Edmund White, Maxim Gorky, Cleanth Brooks, and Robert Penn Warren, Ann Harleman, Thomas Beller, Ben Fountain, and Jacob M. Appel.

== History ==
=== Texas Review ===
The Southwest Review was founded as the Texas Review in 1915 by Stark Young, professor of general literature at the University of Texas at Austin. Jay B. Hubbell, the Southern Methodist University professor who would bring the Review to Dallas in 1924, later reflected on the goals of Young's new journal:

"Young's ambition was to put out a literary magazine, not a critical review like the Sewanee Review or the South Atlantic Quarterly. What he particularly desired was excellent verse and light essays; he did not want learned articles by college professors."

When Young left for Amherst College, editorship of the journal passed to Young's colleague at the University of Texas, Robert Agder Law, an authority on Shakespeare. The Texas Review languished under Law and seemed doomed—a sentiment he expressed to SMU's Hubbell in 1921. After conferring with his colleagues, Hubbell offered to bring the journal to SMU. Law replied that the University of Texas would not permit the journal to move. Three years later, however, they relented. The transfer involved no movement of materials or personnel—Hubbell received only a list of the journal's sixteen subscribers, one of which was the Southwestern Insane Asylum.

=== Southwest Review ===
At SMU, the Texas Review became the Southwest Review, and embraced a regional identity and focus. Hubbell, assisted by English scholar George Bond and historian Herbert Gambrell, edited the journal from 1924 to 1927. The journal was published out of the basement of Dallas Hall, where the editors would sometimes be visited by SMU's founding president, Robert S. Hyer. The Review received acclaim but struggled financially, and at one point Hubbell even wrote to Law to ask if, in the event it became impossible to continue, the University of Texas would take it back. Law said it would. In 1927, however, SMU's administration agreed to allocate $1,000 for the journal in the coming year—enough to keep it going.

When Hubbell and Bond left SMU in 1927, John McGinnis, an English professor, became editor. Henry Nash Smith, then a young instructor in the English department, would recall that the Southwest Review flourished under McGinnis—who taught a full schedule and contributed regularly to the Dallas Morning News—because he turned the production of the journal into a kind of seminar where senior students and junior colleagues collaborated closely throughout the editorial process. Less than a decade after coming to SMU, the Southwest Review had nearly 1000 paid subscribers.

The Great Depression brought various difficulties. Due to financial strain, the Southwest Review was published jointly by SMU and Louisiana State University between 1931 and 1935. The collaboration ended when the LSU side secured funding for their own magazine, the Southern Review. The Southwestern Review survived the decade, largely thanks to its younger staff, including Henry Nash Smith, John Chapman, and Lon Tinkle. A frequent contributor during this era was artist and future director of the Dallas Museum of Fine Art, Jerry Bywaters.

McGinnis continued editing the Southwest Review until 1942. His successor, Donald Day, had a Ph.D. in English but was not on the faculty at SMU. This began a long period of non-faculty editorial leadership. Day managed the publication until 1946. It was then edited by Allen Maxwell until 1963. From 1962 until 1982, it was edited by Margaret Hartley.

In 1984, the Southwest Review, which had never left SMU, appointed its first faculty editor since McGinnis. English professor Willard Spiegelman, working with managing editor Betsey McDougall, would push the journal in a more literary, cosmopolitan direction. Spiegelman would be awarded the PEN/Nora Magid Award for Magazine Editing in 2005.

In 2016, Spiegelman was succeeded by Greg Brownderville, poet and SMU professor of English. Under Brownderville's leadership, the Southwest Review has developed a significant web presence.

== Honors and awards ==
- Ann Harleman's story, Meanwhile, received an O. Henry Award in 2003.
- Ben Fountain's story, Fantasy for Eleven Fingers, won an O. Henry Award in 2005.
- Barbara Moss Klein's story, Little Edens, was short-listed for the O. Henry Award in 2005.
- Merritt Tierce's story, Suck It, was included in Best New Stories from the South 2008.
- Jacob Appel's story, Rods and Cones, was short-listed for Best American Nonrequired Reading in 2008.

== See also ==
- List of literary magazines
- Southern Methodist University Press
