= Charles Claude Selecman =

American Methodist minister and educator (1874–1958)

C. C. Selecman
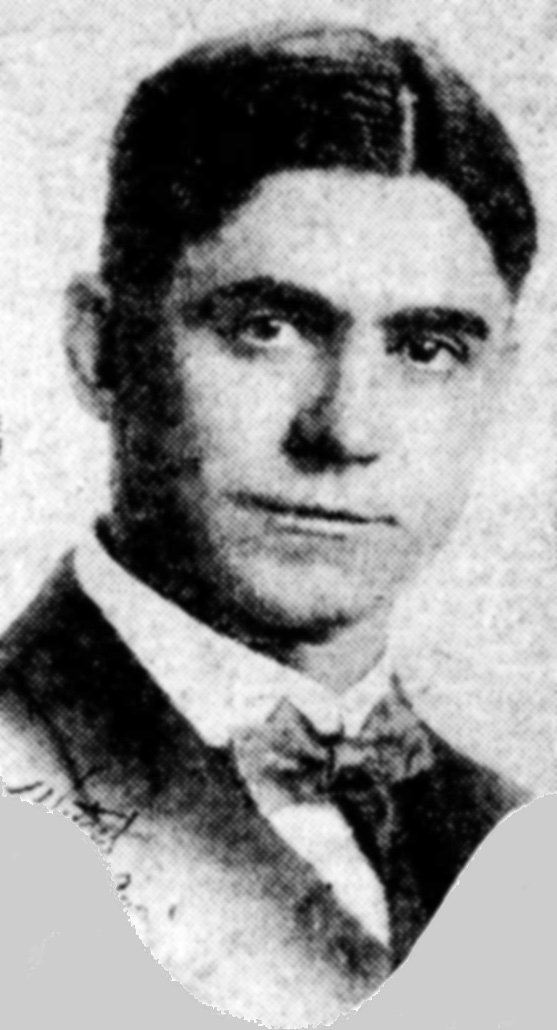
- Selecman in 1919

3rd President of Southern Methodist University
- In office 1923–1938
- Preceded by: Hiram Boaz
- Succeeded by: Umphrey Lee

Personal details
- Born: October 13, 1874 Savannah, Missouri, U.S.
- Died: March 27, 1958 (aged 83) Dallas, Texas, U.S.
- Education: Central College

Charles Claude Selecman (October 13, 1874 – March 27, 1958) was an American Methodist pastor and the third president of Southern Methodist University from 1923 to 1938. Selecman entered office during a difficult financial time for SMU and managed to put the university on sounder footing while expanding the campus and growing the enrollment. These achievements would largely be overshadowed, however, by his chilling effect on SMU's intellectual and social environment.

Selecman was a religious fundamentalist and opponent of secular education who banned dances, shuttered student groups he opposed, and fired faculty with whom he disagreed, including theologian and future Vanderbilt chancellor Harvie Branscomb. In Charles Ferguson's 1929 satirical novel Pigskin, a character based on Selecman is described as "a cross between the Apostle Paul and Benito Mussolini."

In 1938, Selecman was elected as a bishop in the Methodist Episcopal Church, South and departed SMU. In this capacity, he would lead both the Oklahoma Conference and the North Texas Conference. He would ascend to the Methodist Church's highest office, becoming president of the Council of Bishops in 1945.

== Early life and education ==
Charles Claude Selecman was born on October 13, 1874, in Savannah, Missouri. In 1882, he attended Central College in Fayette, Missouri, but never graduated.

== Career ==
Selecman worked as a pastor in Pattonsburg, Missouri, in 1898. Later, he was a missionary in Louisiana and Missouri. In 1913, he was a pastor in Los Angeles, California. By 1914, he became the pastor of the newly built Trinity Auditorium in Downtown Los Angeles.

Selecman moved to Dallas, Texas, in 1920, where he became the pastor of the newly built First Methodist Church, South. The Ku Klux Klan was ascendant in Dallas at this time, and in 1921 Selecman offered his "qualified endorsement" of the white supremacist organization, saying that,

"provided these groups of men are good men, provided they are of good intentions and provided their activities have good effect, I am going to be one of the last to reprimand them for their efforts to check disobedience to the law, disloyalty and indecency."

=== Southern Methodist University ===
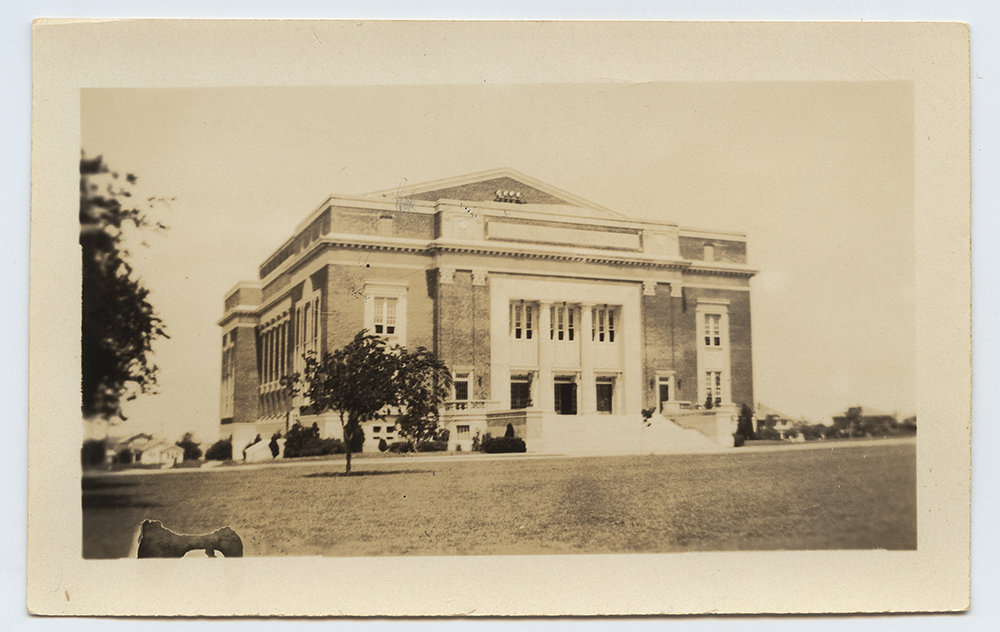
McFarlin Auditorium, built during Selecman's presidency

In 1923, Selecman was appointed as the third President of Southern Methodist University, after at least two other candidates declined the position. Though backed by Dallas Methodists, Selecman was a controversial choice, as he lacked a college degree and had no experience in university administration.

Selecman arrived at the university as it was in the midst of an ideological struggle between fundamentalism and liberalism. The latter represented a small but vital current among faculty and moderate Methodist clergy, who became the targets of fundamentalists like Baptist preacher and Searchlight publisher J. Frank Norris.

In 1923, Norris led an attack on a popular SMU professor, Mims Thornburg Workman, for alleged heresy. In 1925, Selecman fired Workman, who that same year had been chosen by the students as their favorite teacher. When Harvie Branscomb, a rising star on the faculty, expressed his public disapproval of what had happened to Workman in the Dallas Morning News, he was also immediately fired by Selecman. In another incident, Selecman engineered the removal of Joseph D. Doty, instructor and former Rhodes Scholar, for allowing two students to publish a joke about the president's "high-handed methods" and "big stick policy" in the yearbook. In 1932, Selecman, encouraged by English professor and notorious antisemite John O. Beaty, tried and failed twice to get Henry Nash Smith , who would later become "the most distinguished mind of the American Studies movement," to resign for writing the preface to a story by William Faulkner for the Texas Book Club. Jay B. Hubbell, SMU's first professor to have an endowed chair, would later remember of this era:

"SMU was being torn apart by athletic rows and ecclesiastical politics. The dean was almost incompetent, and the autocratic president, whose real ambition was to be bishop, had little understanding of the functions of a university."

By 1930, the financial situation at SMU deteriorated due to the Great Depression. Selecman, who had been given a 25% salary raise, asked his professors and instructors to make a voluntary contribution to cover the budgetary shortfall. The following year, nearly half of the faculty, including three deans, unsuccessfully petitioned for a meeting with the board of trustees to discuss Selecman's future at the university—an event that would be remembered as "The Faculty Rebellion of 1931." Though Selecman survived the rebellion, it led to the creation of the University Council, which would curtail his power somewhat.

Though Selecman was widely disliked by faculty and students, he enjoyed the backing of the Dallas business community, thanks to his support of utilitarian education and college football. He was also involved with fundraising—SMU's endowment grew from US$883,000 to US$2,300,000 during his term—and the campus expanded from two to seven buildings, including future landmarks like McFarlin Memorial Auditorium.

=== Bishop of the Methodist Church ===
Selecman had long wanted to be made a bishop in the Methodist Church and was greatly disappointed when he lost the election at the 1930 General Convention. He was successfully elected to the position in 1938, however, promptly resigned his presidency to move to Oklahoma City. He moved back to Dallas in 1944. In 1945, he was elected President of the Council of Bishops of the Methodist Church. He also served as the President of the Methodist General Board of Evangelism. He retired in 1948, and was elected to the Methodist Hall of Fame in philanthropy in 1951.

Selecman died on March 27, 1958, in Dallas, Texas.

== Legacy ==
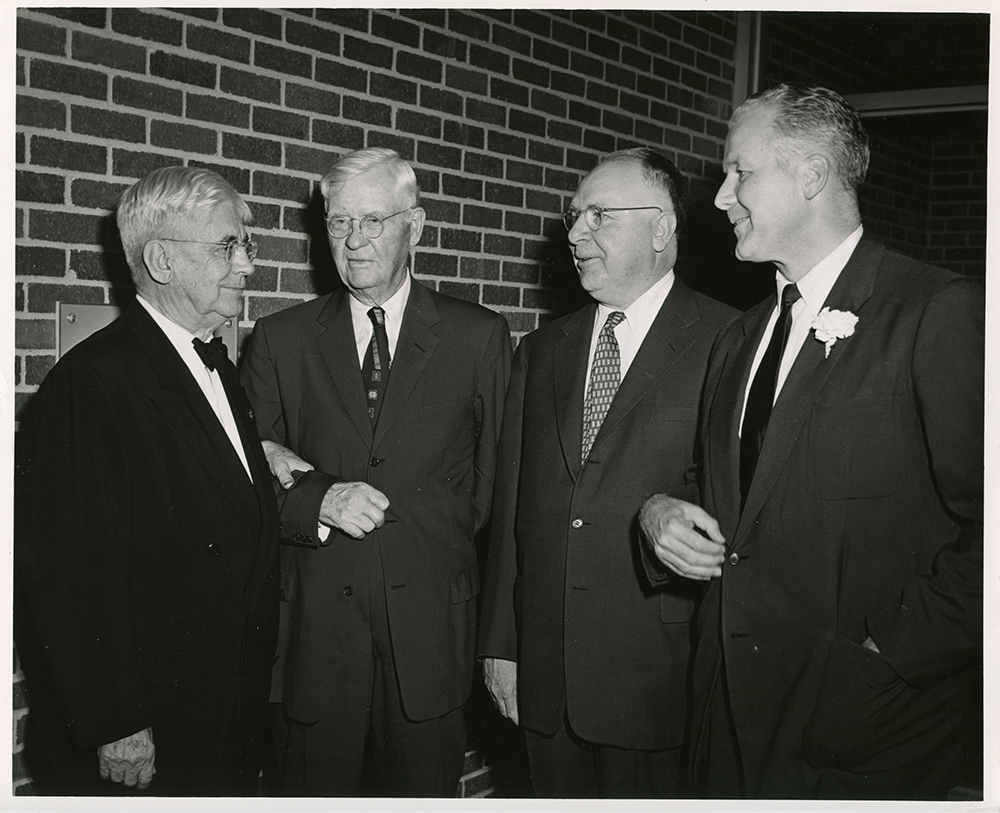
CC Selecman (first on left) with three other SMU presidents, Hiram Boaz, Umphrey Lee, and Willis Tate

Selecman was SMU's first president to hold office for more than a decade, and under his leadership the university embraced its identity as a religious institution. He also expanded the campus, grew the endowment, invested in athletics, championed utilitarian subjects (e.g. engineering, business), and opposed modernism. For this, he enjoyed a good deal of support from reactionary elements in the Methodist church and Dallas' business community.

But he achieved what he did—many faculty and students believed—at the expense of SMU's scholarly mission. Selecman stifled free inquiry and would not hesitate to eliminate even his best professors—like Workman and Branscomb—if they did not conform to his fundamentalist vision of what the university should be. Meanwhile, he abetted an anti-intellectual reactionary—and later full-blown antisemitic conspiracy theorist—John O. Beaty, who created a campus uproar through his frantic efforts to fire a peer for his involvement in the publication of a Faulkner short story. Historian Mary Martha Thomas writes of Selecman:

"As a minister Selecman always emphasized the Christian aspect of education and was anxious to make it felt at SMU. He desired a completely Christian faculty, who would present a Christian view of the world in every class. He felt that moral standards and a sense of right and wrong were nearly lost to his generation...In dealing with the faculty Selecman used high-handed and dictatorial methods, not unlike those of Mussolini."

Selecman's successor, Umphrey Lee, was a renowned Wesley scholar and advocate of the liberal arts who believed that SMU could rival universities like Vanderbilt and Duke. In contrast to Selecman, Lee was the board's unanimous first choice and enjoyed a hearty welcome by both the SMU community and population of Dallas.

== Personal life ==
Selecman married Bess Kyle Beckner on April 27, 1899. They had a son, Dr. Frank Selecman, who married Eloise Olive and had two children. Bess died in 1943 and Selecman married his second wife, Jackie (Mrs. Pierre D. Mason of Hollywood, California,) in June 1948.

== Publications ==
- The Methodist First Reader "On Being a Christian", by Charles Claude Selecman
- The Methodist Primer, by Charles Claude Selecman

== See also ==
- List of bishops of the United Methodist Church
