= Miles Redd =

American interior designer

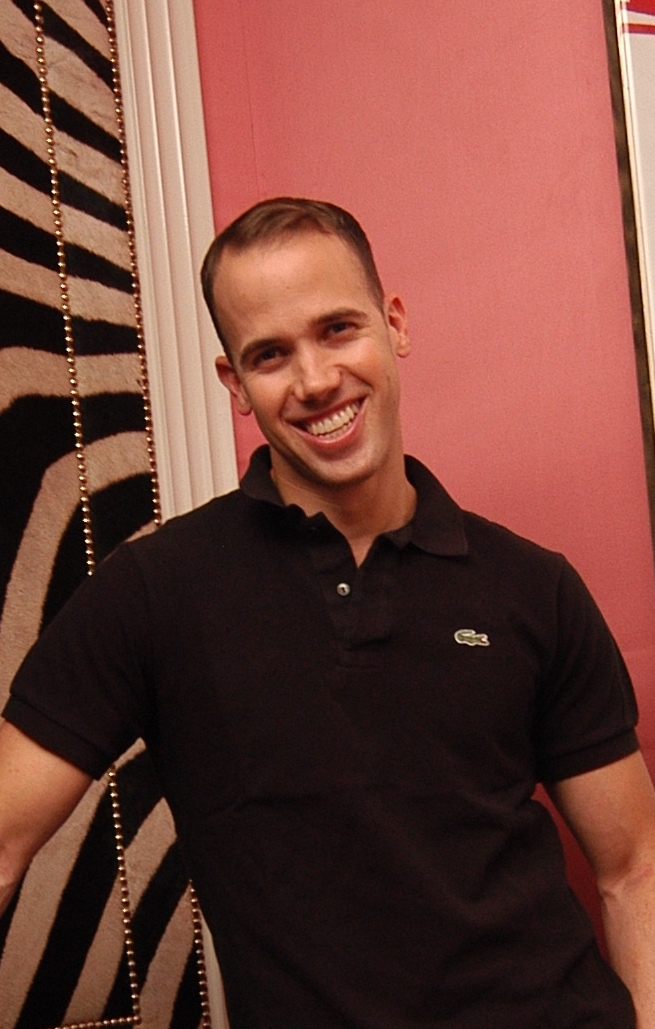
- Born: Atlanta, Georgia, U.S.
- Education: New York University; Parsons School of Design
- Occupation: Interior designer
- Years active: 1998–present
- Known for: Creative director, Oscar de la Renta Home (2003–2013)
- Website: milesredd.com

Miles Redd is an American interior designer based in New York City.

== Early life and education ==
Redd grew up in Atlanta, Georgia and graduated from The Lovett School in 1987. He studied fashion design at the Parsons School of Design and film at New York University.

== Career ==
Redd started his interior design practice in 1998 after training with antiques dealer John Rosselli and decorator Bunny Williams. He served as creative director of Oscar de la Renta Home from 2003 to 2013.

Redd is on Elle Decor's "A-List of Interior Designers" and is a member of Architectural Digest's "AD100," which names "the world's preeminent architects and designers." His work has been featured in Architectural Digest, House Beautiful, Veranda, and Vogue.

In January 2019, Redd announced his new business partner, David Kaihoi, and renamed his firm Redd Kaihoi. The firm is based in the Chelsea neighborhood of Manhattan and works on residential design projects for international clients.

== Product design ==
Redd has designed fabric, wallcovering, and textile collections for Schumacher, as well as rugs for their sister company Patterson Flynn & Martin. In Fall 2017, Redd partnered with Ballard Designs on a collection of furniture, accessories, and lighting; outdoor furniture was added in 2018.

== Publications ==
The Big Book of Chic (2012), published by Assouline, is Redd's first book. His work has also been published in Inspired Design: The 100 Most Important Designers of the Past 100 Years by Jennifer Boles, Interiors: The Greatest Rooms of the Century by Phaidon Press, and Making Rooms Your Own by Editors of the New York Social Diary.

== Media appearances ==
Redd has appeared in video content including simultaneous house tours of his New York and Fire Island Pines residences for The New York Times T Magazine, as well as videos by Architectural Digest and the decorating blog Quintessence.
