= Thomas Fellowes =

Thomas Fellowes may refer to:

- Thomas Fellowes (Royal Navy officer, born 1827) (1827–1923)
- Thomas Fellowes (Royal Navy officer, born 1778) (1778–1853)

== See also ==
- Thomas Fellows (disambiguation)
