= Charles F. Marsh =

American economist

7th President of Wofford College
- In office 1958–1968
- Preceded by: Francis Pendleton Gaines
- Succeeded by: Paul Hardin III

Personal details
- Born: August 18, 1903 Antigo, Wisconsin, U.S.
- Died: January 15, 1984 (aged 80) Williamsburg, Virginia, U.S.
- Education: Lawrence University; University of Illinois

Charles Franklin Marsh (August 18, 1903 – January 15, 1984) was an American economist and academic.

After graduating from Lawrence University in Appleton, Wisconsin in 1925, he went to University of Illinois to receive a Master of Arts in 1926, and a Ph.D. in 1928. He began his academic career as a faculty member at American University, and later was appointed professor of economics at the College of William and Mary, Williamsburg, from 1939 to 1958. From 1952 to 1958 he also served as Dean of the Faculty. Between 1958 and 1968 he was the seventh president of Wofford College and returned to teach at the Graduate School in Williamsburg after his tenure as president ended.

During his time in Williamsburg, Marsh was involved in local civic affairs and served on several economic planning agencies. He also was an active member of the methodist church community and held a seat on the University Senate of the Methodist Church. Furthermore, he was involved with Southern Association of Colleges and Schools, and sat on their Executive Council at the time of the integration crisis at the University of Mississippi.
