= Lovett School =

Private school in Atlanta, Georgia, US

The Lovett School
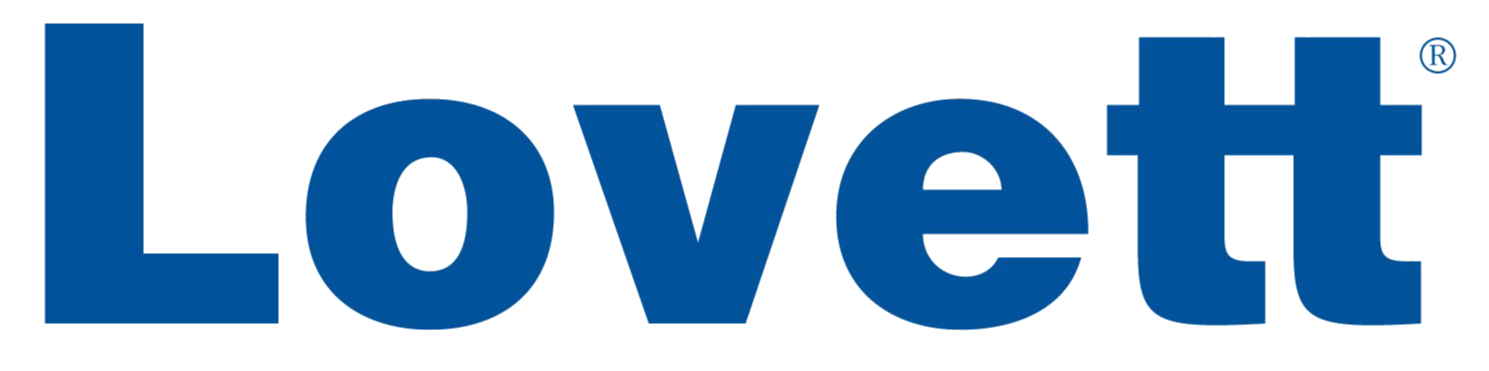

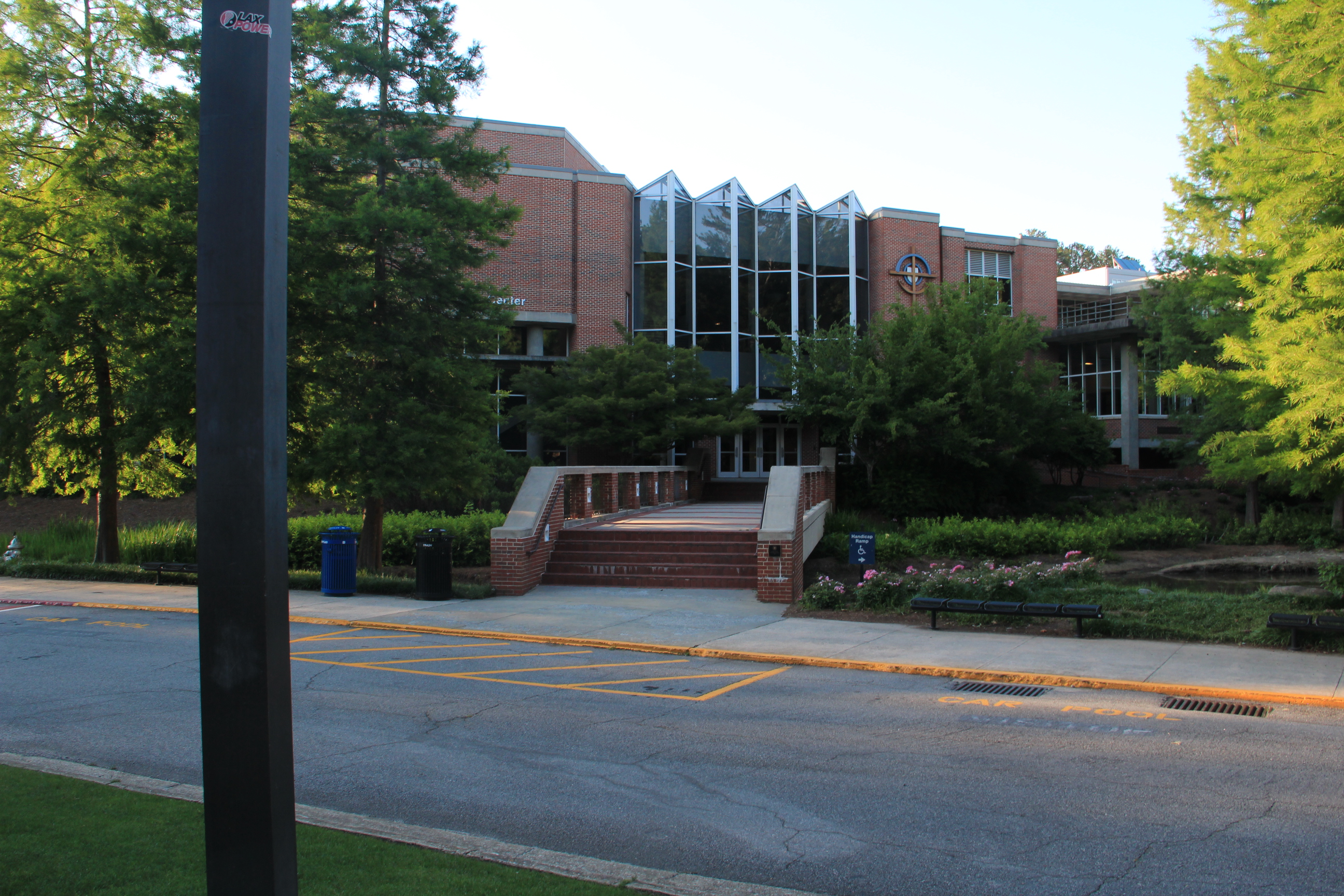
- Lovett School visitor center (now under construction)

Location
- 4075 Paces Ferry Road; Atlanta, Georgia 30327; United States; 33°51′42″N 84°27′09″W

Information
- Motto: Omnia ad Dei Gloriam
- Religious affiliation: Non-denominational
- Established: 1926
- Head of school: Meredyth Cole
- Chaplain: Rev. Steve Allen
- Faculty: 269
- Teaching staff: 214.9 (FTE) (2023–24)
- Grades: K–12
- Gender: Co-educational
- Enrollment: 1,627 (2023–24)
- Student to teacher ratio: 7.6 (2023–24)
- Campus size: 100 acres
- Campus type: Suburban
- Colors: Blue and white
- Mascot: The Lovett Lion
- Accreditations: Southern Association of Colleges and Schools; Southern Association of Independent Schools
- Publication: Lovett Magazine
- Newspaper: The OnLion
- Yearbook: The Leonid
- Tuition: $27,675- $32,130
- Website: lovett.org

The Lovett School is a coeducational kindergarten through twelfth grade independent school located in north Atlanta, Georgia, United States.

== History ==
In September 1926, Eva Edwards Lovett opened the Lovett School with 20 boys and girls in first through third grades in Midtown Atlanta. By 1936, Lovett had become a day school, with a move to a wooded campus north of the city off West Wesley Road.

In 1960-61, Lovett opened at 4075 Paces Ferry Road—Lovett's current location, with an enrollment of 1,024 students, representing all grades except the 12th. By 1964, both the elementary and high schools were accredited by the Georgia Commission of Accreditation (and each year subsequently), and the upper school was accredited by the Southern Association of Colleges and Schools.

In 1992, the school purchased 320 acres of cloud forest, known as Siempre Verde, in Ecuador to set up a research and education center.

The school celebrated its 75th anniversary in 2000-01 with events such as a history exhibition and a reunion for former alumni, faculty, staff and friends of the school.

The school is celebrating its centennial anniversary in 2026-2027 with events such as choosing mascot names, and a picture of the whole school in the shape of the number 100.

In 2017, the school announced that Meredyth Cole would replace retiring headmaster William S. Peebles IV at the end of the 2017–18 school year.

== Integration struggles ==
In 1963, the Lovett School became the focus of a desegregation controversy when it rejected the applications of three black students. In 1963, Coretta Scott King contacted the school and asked if it had a racially nondiscriminatory admissions policy. When the school responded that it would admit a black student, her son, Martin Luther King III applied. However, there was not a guarantee that any particular student would be admitted. King was rejected. The Episcopal Diocese then distanced itself from the school.

At the center of this long ago debate were the school's ties to the Episcopal Diocese of Atlanta, which had been established in 1954. The national Episcopal Church had issued directives to its member dioceses to integrate their institutions; the Lovett School's refusal to do so placed the bishop of Atlanta, the Rt. Rev. Randolph Claiborne Jr., in a difficult situation. After a number of pickets at the school organized by the Episcopal Society for Cultural and Racial Unity, the diocese and school attempted to resolve the situation by severing ties with each other. In later years, the school reportedly revised its admission policy with regards to race.

== Notable alumni ==
- Brent Abernathy (1996), Major League Baseball infielder, 1995 Dial Award winner, outfielder, gold medalist in the 2000 Olympics (baseball)
- David I. Adelman (1982), United States ambassador to the Republic of Singapore, 2010–2013.
- Knox Culpepper (1981), linebacker for the Georgia Bulldogs
- Wes Gordon (2005), fashion designer
- Jeff Greenstein, television writer, producer, and director
- Grant Haley (2014), NFL player
- Gale Harold (1987), actor, Queer as Folk, Vanished, numerous movies and TV appearances
- Mary Louise Kelly (1989), broadcaster and author
- Shane Kimbrough (1985), NASA Astronaut
- Christine Lakin (1997), actress; played "Al" on Step By Step as a child
- Charlotte Laws (1978), author, talk show host, former Los Angeles politician, animal rights advocate, anti-revenge porn activist (often called "the Erin Brockovich of revenge porn")
- George Lombard (1994), Major League Baseball outfielder
- Whit Marshall, NFL player
- Read Montague (1978), neuroscientist and author
- Eric Nam (2007), Korean-American singer, featured on Birth of a Great Star 2 in 2012
- Adam Nelson (1993), silver medalist in the 2000 Olympics and gold medalist at the 2004 Olympics (shot put)
- Tivon Pennicott (2004), Grammy Award winning saxophonist
- Miles Redd (1987), interior designer
- Aaron Schunk (2016), baseball player
- Kabir Sehgal (2001), author and Grammy-winning producer
- Jens Söring (1984), German citizen convicted for the 1985 double murderer of his then girlfriend's parents
- Mark Stringer (1982), conductor
- Maggie Thrash (2003), author
- Liza Wieland (1978), author
- Burke Whitman (1974), Major General, United States Marine Corps
