= Paul Hardin III =

American academic administrator

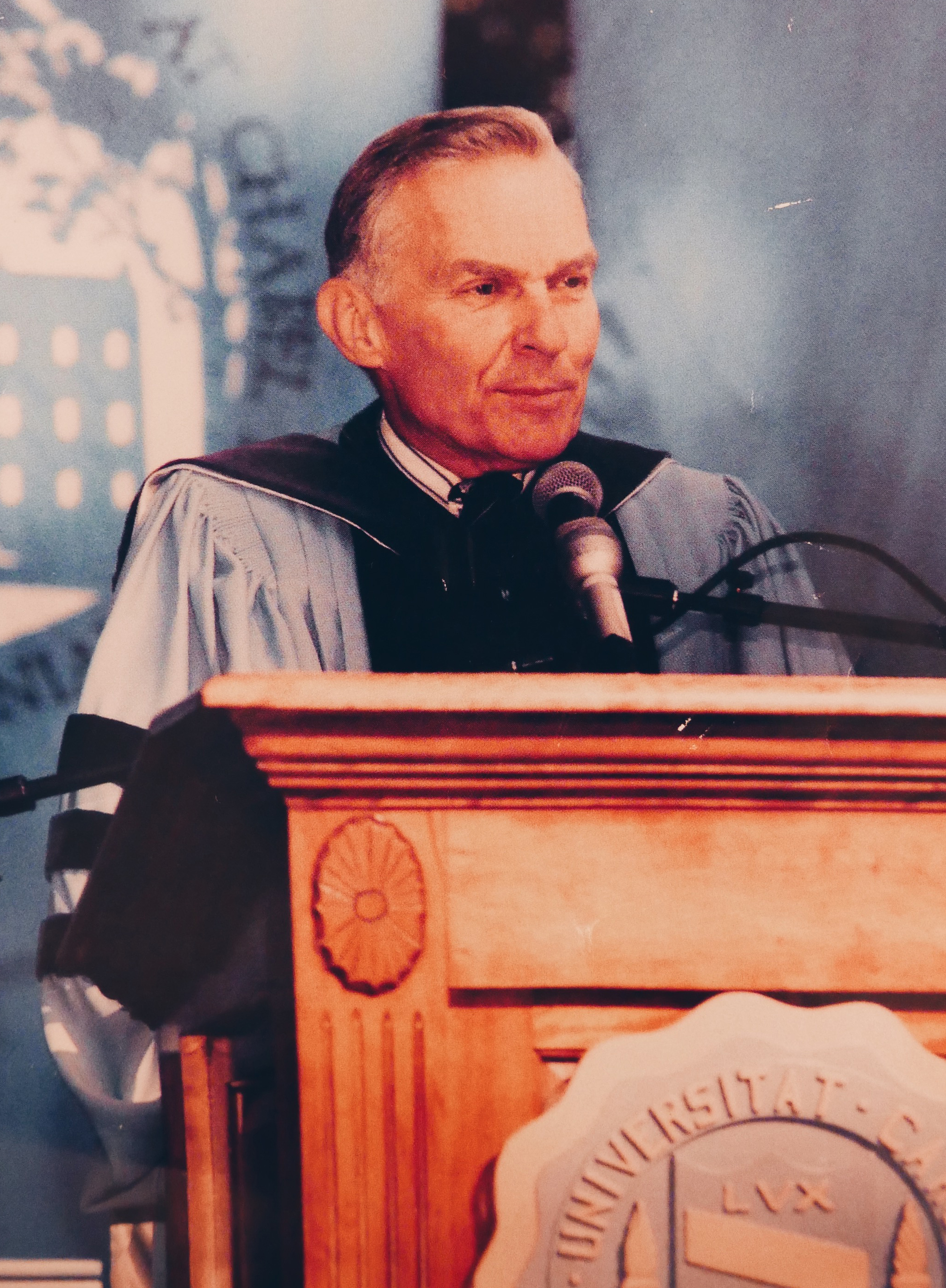
- Paul Hardin III, Chancellor of the University of North Carolina at Chapel Hill, addresses the UNC community on University Day, 1993.

7th Chancellor of the University of North Carolina at Chapel Hill
- In office 1988–1995
- Preceded by: Christopher Columbus Fordham
- Succeeded by: Michael Hooker

8th President of Wofford College
- In office 1968–1972
- Preceded by: Charles F. Marsh
- Succeeded by: Joe Lesesne

6th President of Southern Methodist University
- In office 1972–1974
- Preceded by: Willis M. Tate
- Succeeded by: James Zumberge

President of Drew University
- In office 1974–1988

Personal details
- Born: June 11, 1931 Charlotte, North Carolina, U.S.
- Died: July 1, 2017 (aged 86) Chapel Hill, North Carolina, U.S.
- Education: Duke University
- Occupation: Lawyer

Paul Hardin III (June 11, 1931 – July 1, 2017) was an American academic administrator who spent 27 years as a leader in higher education. He was the chancellor of the University of North Carolina at Chapel Hill from 1988 to 1995, president of Wofford College from 1968 to 1972, of Southern Methodist University from 1972 to 1974, and of Drew University from 1974 to 1988. He was trained as a lawyer at Duke University and at the Duke University Law School.

== Early life and education ==
The son of Paul Hardin Jr., a Methodist bishop, and Dorothy Reel Hardin, Paul Hardin III was born in Charlotte, North Carolina, on June 11, 1931, and grew up in Concord, Waynesville, Wadesboro, Asheboro, Shelby and High Point, North Carolina. He earned both his bachelors and law degrees from Duke University, where he was inducted into Phi Beta Kappa, finished first in his law school class, served as editor-in-chief of the Duke Law Journal, and played on the golf team.

Hardin fell in love with Barbara Stone Russell, whose father was also a Methodist minister, the summer before his junior year at Duke (Barbara was a rising freshman at Duke) while they were both vacationing at Lake Junaluska, in the North Carolina mountains. In 1954, he declined an invitation to compete for a Rhodes Scholarship due to his desire to stay at Duke with Barbara. He received his law degree on the same day that Barbara completed her AB, and the two were married the day after graduation in 1954.

After service in the US Army Counter Intelligence Corps, Hardin practiced law in Birmingham. He returned to Duke Law School where he served on the faculty for ten years before becoming President of Wofford College at the age of 37.

== Academic administration career ==
=== Wofford College (1968-1972) ===
Hardin assumed the presidency of Wofford College in the late 1960s—a time of student unrest across the country. He is credited with championing openness on campus, introducing an open speakers policy and assuring free student expression. He spearheaded continued efforts to desegregate the student body, and he hired the first African-American administrator at Wofford.

=== Southern Methodist University (1972-1974) ===
Hardin went on to serve as President of Southern Methodist University, in Dallas, Texas. Two years into his tenure, he discovered infractions within the SMU football program involving coaches, boosters and university trustees. Hardin reported the violations to the NCAA, a move that was applauded by some, but eventually led to his forced resignation at the hands of powerful members of the SMU Board of Governors. After his departure, the malfeasance continued into the 1990s, eventually leading to the Southern Methodist University football scandal.

Hardin did not view the event as a setback. In fact, he considered it a jumping off point for a successful career in academic administration.

I think some people flinched and they were the people who later got that university into such trouble that they incurred the only death penalty in the history of the NCAA," Hardin said. "So I tried to curb this before it got under way and they really suggested that I go elsewhere. And that's when my career really perked up.

=== Drew University (1974-1988) ===
After his ouster from Dallas, Hardin moved to New Jersey to lead Drew University. He built a reputation as a charismatic fundraiser and an energetic leader. Among his legacies at Drew are the United Methodist Church Archives Center, the remodeled Learning Center and the Research Institute for Scientists Emeriti (RISE) program. While at Drew, he worked to bolster the sciences at the small liberal arts campus. In 1983, long before it was widespread practice, Drew assigned a personal computer to every student.

=== University of North Carolina at Chapel Hill (1988-1995) ===
To those familiar with the Tobacco Road rivalry, Hardin may have seemed an unlikely candidate to become Chancellor at North Carolina. But in spite of his Duke pedigree, and after stints at several smaller private institutions, he took the reins at the large public research university in 1988. The Chapel Hill campus offered stark contrast against the backdrop of the tiny, private Wofford and Drew communities, and Hardin encountered the understandable culture shock of operating as an administrator in the public sector.

Hardin was hired to lead UNC into its third century, first by spearheading the largest capital campaign in school history. He led the effort with his characteristic enthusiasm and gusto. In the end the campaign raised $440 million, well over its goal of $300 million. The Bicentennial Observance culminated in a University Day celebration in 1993, during which Hardin conferred an honorary degree upon President Bill Clinton. The 130 events of the Bicentennial Observance was chronicled by executive director Steven Tepper in a book published by the university in 1998.

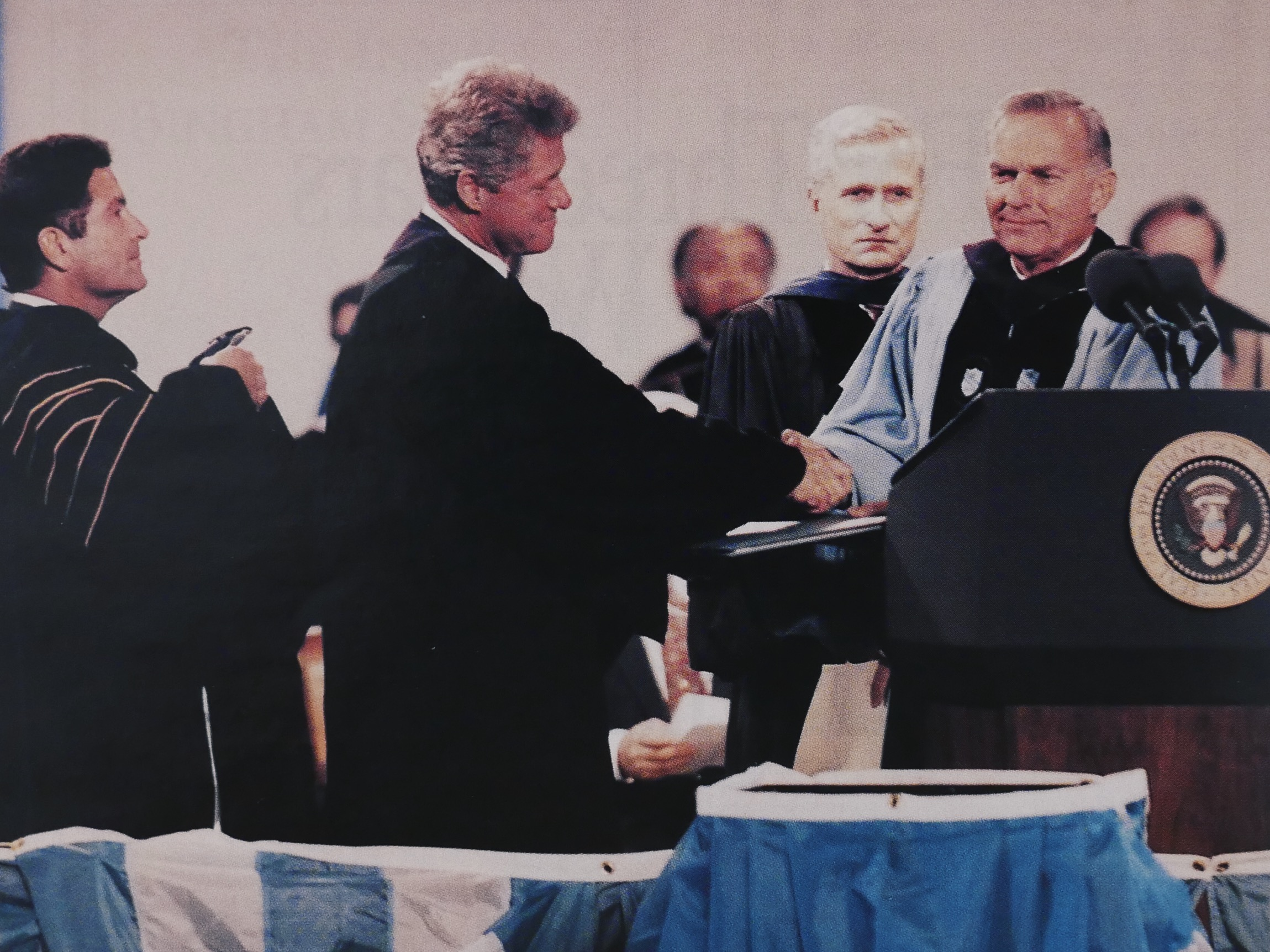
Chancellor Paul Hardin of the University of North Carolina at Chapel Hill confers an honorary degree upon President Bill Clinton at University Day, 1993

Hardin's time at UNC was not without conflict. In 1992 he refused student demands to build a freestanding Black Cultural Center on campus, recommending instead to expand the BCC's current space within the existing Student Union. He believed that a freestanding center would promote separatism, but proponents of the idea believed he was degrading the importance of black culture on campus. Emphasizing his position, Hardin stated, "We want a forum, not a fortress." The disagreement led to the largest demonstration movement on campus since Vietnam. The protests garnered national attention, with Rev. Jesse Jackson and filmmaker Spike Lee coming to Chapel Hill to support the cause. In 1993, Hardin appointed a planning committee to assess the situation and recommend a course of action. The committee concluded that a freestanding center was appropriate, but supported Hardin in his belief that the center should be a working classroom building controlled by the Office of the Provost, rather than a separate student union under the Department of Student Affairs. The Sonja Haynes Stone Black Cultural Center opened in 2004.

Hardin deemed the period "the greatest personal anguish" of his career. Hardin was active in civil rights issues, and even ran for mayor of Durham in 1967, losing in part due to his liberal views on race relations. He worried that he was being portrayed as a "60s liberal who stopped growing," while in fact throughout his career he worked to promote underrepresented groups and opinions on campuses and in his administrations.

I had always championed diversity and had taken steps to establish diversity on this campus and had said that if you satisfy me that you're establishing an institution that would be open and that will be constructive, I will support it to the hilt."

In the midst of politics, state budget constraints and other roadblocks, his triumphs outweighed his hardships. When he retired in 1995, Hardin left the university with a larger student body, a healthier budget and an endowment that had more than doubled.

== Professional and personal legacy ==
Hardin was a figure in higher education known for his work in university leadership and fundraising. He was awarded several honorary degrees, served on corporate boards, and held leadership roles within the United Methodist Church and various community organizations. An amateur golfer, he competed in the 1962 British Open and remained active in the sport throughout his life.

Paul Hardin III died at his Chapel Hill home of amyotrophic lateral sclerosis on July 1, 2017, at age 86.
