= Whit Marshall =

American football player (born 1973)

No. 58, 54, 55
- Positions: Linebacker, long snapper

Personal information
- Born: January 6, 1973 (age 53); Atlanta, Georgia, U.S.
- Listed height: 6 ft 2 in (1.88 m)
- Listed weight: 247 lb (112 kg)

Career information
- High school: The Lovett School (Atlanta)
- College: Georgia (1991–1995)
- NFL draft: 1996: 5th round, 147th overall pick

Career history
- Philadelphia Eagles (1996); Indianapolis Colts (1998); Frankfurt Galaxy (1999); Atlanta Falcons (1999)

Awards and highlights
- World Bowl champion (1999); Second-team All-SEC (1995)

Career NFL statistics
- Total tackles: 2
- Stats at Pro Football Reference

Thomas Whitfield Marshall (born January 6, 1973) is an American former professional football player who was a linebacker for two seasons in the National Football League (NFL) with the Philadelphia Eagles and Atlanta Falcons. He was selected by the Eagles in the fifth round of the 1996 NFL draft after playing college football for the Georgia Bulldogs. Marshall also played for the Frankfurt Galaxy of NFL Europe.

== Early life and college ==
Thomas Whitfield Marshall was born on January 6, 1973, in Atlanta, Georgia. He attended The Lovett School in Atlanta.

Marshall played college football for the Bulldogs of the University of Georgia. He redshirted in 1991 and was a four-year letterman from 1992 to 1995. He earned Associated Press second-team All-SEC honors his senior year in 1995. Marshall graduated in 1995 with a degree in consumer economics.

== Professional career ==
Marshall was selected by the Philadelphia Eagles in the fifth round, with the 47th overall pick, of the 1996 NFL draft. He officially signed with the team on July 15. He was released on August 25 and signed to the team's practice squad on August 28. Marshall was promoted to the active roster on November 19 and played in one game for the Eagles during the 1996 season. He also appeared in one playoff game that year. He was released on August 19, 1997.

Marshal signed with the Indianapolis Colts on March 3, 1998. He was released on September 7, 1998.

Marshall played in all ten games, starting ten, for the Frankfurt Galaxy of NFL Europe in 1999, recording 34 defensive tackles, two special team tackles, three sacks, one pass breakup, and one forced fumble. The Galaxy finished the season with a 6–4 record and won World Bowl '99 against the Barcelona Dragons by a score of 38–24.

Marshall was signed by the Atlanta Falcons on July 7, 1999. He played in 15 games in 1999, totaling two solo tackles and one kick return for two yards. He was also a long snapper while with the Falcons. Marshall was released on August 18, 2000.

== Personal life ==
Marshall entered the real estate business after his NFL career.
