= Willis M. Tate =

President of Southern Methodist University

5th President of Southern Methodist University
- In office 1954–1971
- Preceded by: Umphrey Lee
- Succeeded by: Paul Hardin III

Personal details
- Born: May 18, 1911 Denver, Colorado
- Died: October 1, 1989 (aged 78) Colorado
- Education: Southern Methodist University (BA, MA)

Willis McDonald Tate (May 18, 1911 – October 1, 1989) was an academic administrator who served as the 5th President of Southern Methodist University from 1954 to 1971 and again in an interim capacity from July 1974 to October 1975. Tate's era at SMU is remembered for its openness and commitment to academic freedom. During his presidency, SMU fully integrated its student body, declined to ban books on communism, and hosted then-controversial speakers, including John Gates and Martin Luther King Jr.

In the 1950s and 1960s, Tate was reviled by some conservative elements in Dallas as a "Communist dupe" and a "pinko." His devotion to free inquiry also won him plaudits, however, and in 1965, he was honored by the American Association of University Professors with the Alexander Meiklejohn Award.

Tate was himself an alumnus of SMU, where he had studied sociology and been an all-conference tackle and honorable mention All-American in 1931, a during which the SMU Mustangs won the Southwest Conference Championship. Tate was inducted into the SMU Athletics Hall of Fame in 1982.

== Early life and education ==
Willis M. Tate was born in Denver, Colorado. He attended Southern Methodist University, receiving a B.A. in 1932 and an M.A. in Sociology in 1935.

== Academic career ==
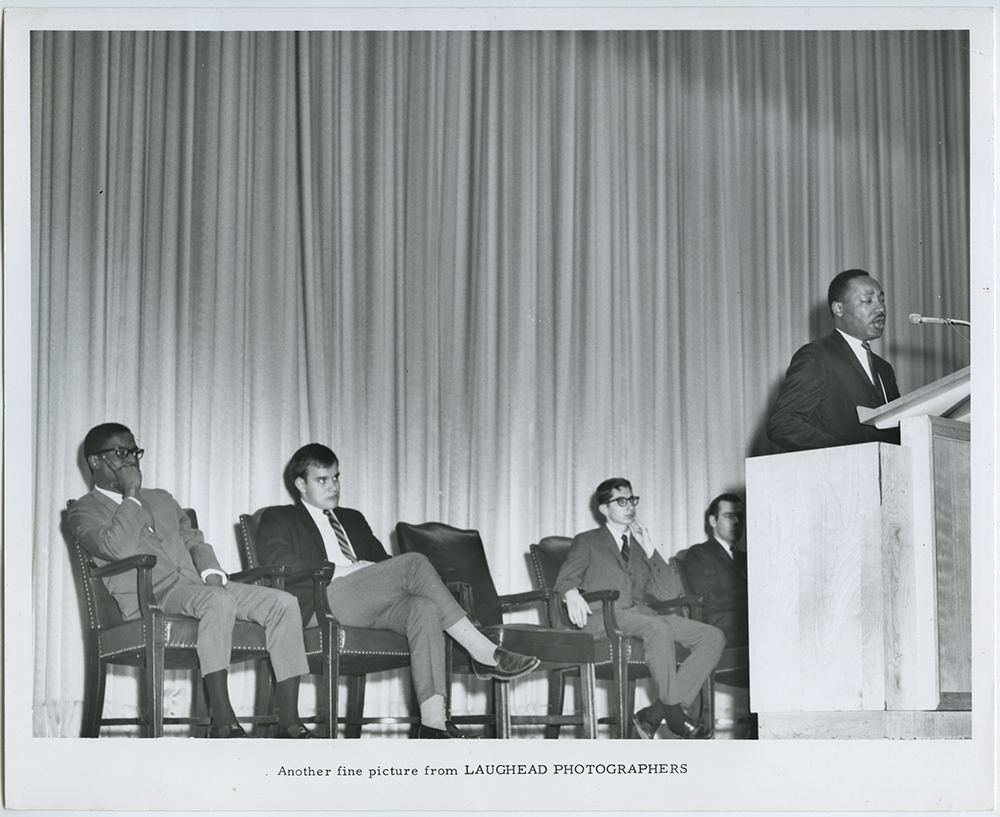
Martin Luther King Jr. speaks at SMU in 1966

After graduating, Tate worked as a teacher and school principal in San Antonio, Texas. In 1945, returned to Southern Methodist to work as assistant dean of students. He served as its president from 1954 to 1975, with a one-year hiatus in 1974.

He died of a heart attack in Colorado in 1989.

He served as chairman of the Independent College Funds of America and president of the National Association of Schools and Colleges of the Methodist Church. He was also a member of the Lambda Chi Alpha fraternity and Cycen Fjodr. In 1965, he received the Alexander Meiklejohn Award of the American Association of University Professors for support of academic freedom.

== Legacy ==
At SMU, Tate presided over an era of relative openness. In the conservative Dallas of the 1950s and early 1960s, his commitment to academic freedom was striking and not without risk.
