= Jay B. Hubbell =

American academic (1885–1979)

Jay Broadus Hubbell (May 8, 1885 – February 13, 1979) was an American academic who specialized in the literature of the Southern United States.

Born in Virginia, he studied at Richmond College and Harvard University before beginning his teaching career. He taught at Southern Methodist University for several years and at Duke University for almost thirty years. Hubbell served as editor of several journals and was the founding editor of the MLA-affiliated American Literature.

== Early life and education ==
Jay Broadus Hubbell was born in Smyth County, Virginia, on May 8, 1885. His mother was Ruth Eller Hubbell and his father was David Shelton Hubbell, a Baptist minister who served in churches across Virginia. His brother Paul Edgar Hubbell was a history professor at Michigan State Normal College and his sister Ruth Anne Hubbell was a librarian in Washington, D.C.

Hubbell received his undergraduate degree from Richmond College (later University of Richmond) in 1905. His father had been educated at the same school. In 1908, Hubbell received a master's degree from Harvard University. Over the next ten years, Hubbell taught at Wake Forest University, University of North Carolina, and Southern Methodist University (SMU) in Dallas, Texas.

During the First World War, Hubbell served as an artillery officer. He later received a PhD from Columbia University in 1922.

== Academic career ==
Hubbell continued teaching after the First World War, becoming chair of the English department and E. A. Lilly Professor English at SMU. In 1927, he joined the faculty at Duke University. Over the next three decades, Hubbell taught summer sessions at the University of Colorado, Columbia University and UCLA. He took part in two exchange professorships at the University of Vienna in 1949 and 1950, and one with the University of Athens in 1953.

Hubbell left Duke in 1954, but continued teaching at schools including Clemson University, University of Virginia, Hebrew University, Columbia University, Texas Tech and the University of Kentucky. He officially retired from teaching in 1961.

== Group membership and journal editing ==
From 1924 until 1927, Hubbell was editor of the Southwest Review.

Hubbell was the first Honorary Member of the Poe Studies Association.

=== Modern Language Association ===
Hubbell was an early member of the American Literature section of the Modern Language Association (MLA), serving as its chairman from 1924 until 1927. In 1928, he became the founding editor of the MLA-affiliated journal American Literature. He served as its editor for 25 years, being described in its obituary of him as the "founder, father [and] pilot".

Hubbell served on the executive council of the MLA from 1947 to 1949, being elected its vice president in 1951.

In 1964, the MLA's American Literature section began awarding the Jay B. Hubbell Medallion for lifetime achievement. The first recipient was Hubbell himself.

== Writing career ==
In the 1920s, Hubbell worked with John O. Beaty to compile and publish two anthologies: An Introduction to Poetry, published in 1922; and An Introduction to Drama, published in 1927.

In 1936, Hubbell published a two-volume anthology called American Life in Literature. It was reprinted during the Second World War for use by the United States Armed Forces Institute. In 1954, he published the book The South in American Literature. He published Southern Life in Fiction in 1960.

Hubbell continued to publish books after his retirement in 1961, releasing the essay collection South and Southwest in 1965 and Who Are the Major American Writers? in 1972.

Hubbell's published works also include a memoir of his wife and a history of the Yates Baptist Church in Durham, North Carolina.

== Personal life ==
While teaching at SMU in the 1910s, Hubbell met Lucinda Smith: she had been studying his course on English literature. The pair married in 1918 and had two sons (Jay Jr. and David Smith).

== Death and legacy ==
Hubbell died on February 13, 1979. He was 93 years old.

In 1967, Hubbell received a Festschrift of 23 essays titled Essays in American Literature in Honor of Jay B. Hubbell. In 1976, his former colleagues at Duke University founded the Jay B. Hubbell Center for American Literary Historiography, a depository of papers by scholars in the field of American literature.

In his obituary of Hubbell, Rayburn S. Moore described him as "a pioneer in the scholarly study of American literature".

== Awards and honors ==
- Jay B. Hubbell Medallion from the Modern Language Association's American Literature section (1964)
- Festschrift (1967)
- Honorary degree from Southern Methodist University
- Honorary degree from University of Richmond
- Honorary degree from Clemson University
