= Thomas Fellows (activist) =

Founder of Colorado Ped Patrol

- Born: Thomas Fellows; September 7, 1981 (age 45)
- Years active: 2021–present
- Organization: Colorado Ped Patrol
- Known for: Predator catching

Thomas Ray Fellows is the founder of Colorado Ped Patrol, a predator catching group that monitors online dating platforms for adults who send sexual messages to minors.

== Biography ==
Fellows had worked at his friend owned window cleaning company before he started carrying out predator sting operations in 2021. His confrontations with the suspects are livestreamed on his YouTube channel Colorado Ped Patrol, and have led to arrests being made. Fellows has worked with online grooming survivor Celeste Hilton, who works as a "decoy" for Colorado Ped Patrol by posing as a teenager on social media websites.

Most of Fellows' predator catches occur in Colorado, but he has conducted stings in other states including Texas, New Jersey, Nevada, Georgia, Kansas, Missouri, Illinois, Indiana, Ohio, New York, and Wyoming.

In 2023, an associate of Fellows known as "Vanessa" created her own predator catching organization inspired by Fellows', called "Child Ped Patrol WV". In 2024, another associate of Fellows known by his online alias "Cooley" created a Colorado Ped Patrol offshoot called "CPP New York". Cooley was present in many Colorado Ped Patrol videos, often recording Fellows' confrontations with alleged child predators.

As of January 2025, Fellows claimed that Colorado Ped Patrol has conducted 500 confrontations and 250 arrests. Colorado Ped Patrol remains actively uploading predator confrontations on YouTube, despite their accounts being banned by YouTube multiple times.

== Controversy ==
In 2022, Fellows drew criticism for allegedly misrepresenting his organization, Colorado Ped Patrol, as a non-profit 501(c)(3). At the time, Fellows had received $55,000 from his supporters in YouTube live chat donations. Many of his supporters believed that their donations were tax deductible due to false claims about Colorado Ped Patrol's non-profit status.

Despite his frequent involvement with police during his investigations, Fellows has also faced criticism from law enforcement. David Porter of the Weld County Sheriff's Office in Colorado said that Fellows' confrontations with suspected child predators are dangerous and could lead to violence.

== Lawsuits ==
In August 2023, Fellows was charged with child abuse, a misdemeanor, under the suspicion of having evicted his two children from his house and telling them not to return.

On December 1, 2023, Juleon Duran filed a lawsuit against Fellows and Colorado Ped Patrol after he was accused of being a child predator on a Colorado Ped Patrol YouTube livestream. Duran was arrested by Westminster police shortly after his confrontation with Fellows. In his lawsuit, Duran alleges that Fellows accusations were false and that Fellows had used an unrelated phone number to link Duran to a person who had sent sexual messages to a minor. Duran was ultimately released from police custody without charges.

In 2024, a Weld County judge granted Fellows a permanent protection order after finding that one of Fellows' online critics, had made a death threat in a satirical video published on the internet. In the same year, YouTube banned Fellows' channel, as well as other channels that he had created for purposes of ban evasion. When asked, a spokesperson for YouTube stated that the website does not allow the broadcasting of sex sting operations on the platform. At the time of his deplatforming, Fellows was facing a misdemeanor charge under the suspicion of having punched a former supporter of his during a livestream.
