= Hiram Abiff Boaz =

Hiram Boaz
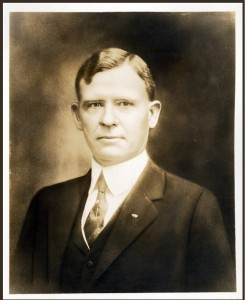

2nd President of Southern Methodist University
- In office 1920–1922
- Preceded by: Robert Stewart Hyer
- Succeeded by: Charles Claude Selecman

Personal details
- Born: December 18, 1866 Murray, Kentucky
- Died: January 2, 1962 (aged 95) Dallas, Texas
- Education: Sam Houston Normal Institute

Hiram Abiff Boaz (1866–1962) was the President of Polytechnic College (now Texas Wesleyan University) from 1902 to 1911, and of Southern Methodist University from 1920 to 1922. He then became an American bishop in the Methodist Episcopal Church, South.

== Early life and education ==
Hiram Abiff Boaz was born in Murray, Kentucky, on December 18, 1866. He graduated from the Sam Houston Normal Institute in 1887, and Southwestern University, from which he received a B.S. in 1893 and an M.A. in 1894. In 1894, he married Carrie Browne, daughter of a Methodist preacher. They met while both were attending Sam Houston Normal School; the couple later had three daughters. He was a member of the Kappa Alpha Order. He became a Methodist pastor and served in Fort Worth, Abilene, and Dublin.

== Academic career ==
From 1902 to 1911, Boaz served as the president of Polytechnic College in Fort Worth, Texas. In 1911, he briefly became the first vice-president of Southern Methodist University before returning to Polytechnic College for five more years. From 1918 to 1920, he served as the secretary of the Methodist Board of Church Extension in Louisville, Kentucky. From 1920 to 1922, he served as the second president of Southern Methodist University.

In 1922, Boaz became a bishop in the Methodist Episcopal Church, South. He served in the Far East, Arkansas, Oklahoma, Texas, and New Mexico. He retired in 1938, and became a trustee of Southern Methodist University and Southwestern University.

== Personal life ==
Boaz was a freemason and later affiliated his masonic membership to Hillcrest Lodge, which at that time was located on Hillcrest Avenue across the street from SMU.

== Bibliography ==
- Fundamentals of Success: Or, Making the Most of Life (1923)
- The Essentials of an Effective Ministry (1937)
- Eighty-four Golden Years (1951)

== See also ==
- List of bishops of the United Methodist Church
