= Thomas Fellows (author) =

American author

- Education: Samford University; The Westminster Schools
- Occupation: Author
- Notable work: Forget Self-Help: Re-Examining the Golden Rule
- Website: www.thfellows.com

Thomas Fellows is an American author of non-fiction self-help books.

== Early life and education ==
He attended The Westminster Schools as well as Samford University, in Birmingham, Alabama.

== Career ==
Fellows is the self-styled Founder and Principal of CommenceAI, a venture of unclear scale or impact. He contributes occasional opinion pieces to the business section of The Virginian-Pilot., typically centering on his own philosophies.

He has independently published four books that attempt to blend biblical scripture, historical references, and literary allusions—often relying more on assertion than coherence: He Spoke with Authority: Get, the Give the Advantage of Confidence,The Criminal: The Power of an Apology, and Mrs. Dubose's Last Wish: The Art of Embracing Suffering.His writing frequently leans on popular films and music, suggesting a preference for broad cultural name-dropping over original insight. Fellows credits his bipolar diagnosis for his creativity in his writing and has discussed how treatment for ADHD improved his ability to focus and work productively.

=== Writing ===
Fellows started his first book, Forget Self-Help: Re-Examining the Golden Rule, at age twenty while he was a counselor at a summer camp in Mentone, Alabama. Based upon the Golden Rule found in Matthew 7:12, the book examines the actions of characters in To Kill a Mockingbird and Uncle Tom's Cabin as well as the writings of Robert E. Lee and Martin Luther King Jr. Fellows not only encourages the reader to follow the Golden Rule, but says that the Golden Rule is lost in modern-day Christianity. It also gives tips for overcoming clinical depression which Fellows has struggled with since he graduated high school.

While the book is grounded in scripture, the author commented in the Newnan Times Herald that he "didn't just write it for Christians." Faye Daysen of The Pilot writes that "Fellows uses scripture, but doesn't hit readers over the head with it."

His second book, He Spoke with Authority: Get, then Give the Advantage of Confidence, explores the connection between confidence, humility and empathy. Fellows wrote the majority of the first edition of the book in 45 days, while working at a Walmart store in the midtown neighborhood of Atlanta. By using characters such as Jay Gatsby in The Great Gatsby, and Jane in Jane Eyre, he argues confidence is important to have in interpersonal relationships and in life. From a historical lens, he uses George Washington and Abraham Lincoln. Lastly, the book explores the role that confidence played in the life of Bill McDermott, former CEO of SAP, who Fellows says has "taught [him] more about life than sales."

The Criminal: The Power of An Apology, examines the Criminal on the Cross found in Luke 23:29-43, who gave an unprovoked apology next to Jesus before he died. Fellows examines the humility and vulnerability displayed in the scene and uses classic novels, popular movies and popular music to make his case. In a review by The Valdosta Daily Times, Dean Poling says, "The Criminal looks at the empowerment behind well-known concepts: It takes a big person to apologize. There is power in humility. Less is more."

Mrs. Dubose's Last Wish: The Art of Embracing Suffering was inspired by a character in To Kill a Mockingbird named Mrs. Dubose, who suffers on purpose to rid herself of a morphine addiction and by the writing David Brooks did in "The Road to Character". Drawing on examples in classic literature, popular music, movies, history and the Bible, Fellows makes the claim that the more suffering one goes through, the more empathy they can build. The book also describes the rags-to-riches story of Bill McDermott. A review in the Laredo Morning Post described the book as "short, meaningful and spiritual". The foreword was written by Nassir Ghaemi.

=== Workforce commentary ===
Fellows regularly appears on local media outlets across the country on workforce related issues such as how artificial intelligence will affect the workforce, the degree to which colleges prepare students for the workforce, and unions.

=== Economic commentary ===
Fellows appears frequently on local affiliate TV stations across the country discussing economic matters such as how tariffs will affect specific city's businesses and consumers.
