= Southern Methodist University Press =

University publishing house

- Parent company: Southern Methodist University
- Status: Defunct
- Founded: 1937
- Successor: Bridwell Press at SMU, founded 2022
- Country of origin: United States
- Headquarters location: University Park, Texas
- Publication types: Books

Southern Methodist University Press (or SMU Press) was a university press that is part of Southern Methodist University. It was established in 1937 and released eight to ten titles each year and was known for its literary fiction. It was scheduled to suspend operations on June 1, 2010. The provost of SMU announced in 2011 plans to reorganize the press with a smaller budget and different goals. It closed again in 2015. In 2022, a new publishing operation at SMU began, Bridwell Press.

== History ==
The first book published by the press was Samuel Wood Greiser's Naturalists of the Frontier (1937). However, the unofficial start of the SMU Press was in 1924, when the Southwest Review was moved from Austin to Dallas. John H. McGinnis served as the unpaid, unofficial editor-in-chief of the Southwest Review from 1927 to 1943 and played an essential role in founding the press. McGinnis acted as the unofficial director of the press during its first five years, in which only three titles were published. In 1939 Maxwell Allen was the first to become a paid employee of the press. From 1942 to 1945, Allen served in the Navy and then returned on January 1, 1946, as the director of the SMU Press. He continued as director until his retirement in 1981. The press reached its 100th title published in 1964.

== Bridwell Press at SMU ==
In 2022, Anthony J. Elia, Director of SMU’s Bridwell Library founded a new academic press called the Bridwell Press, an open access e-publishing operation with print-on-demand hard copies. As of December 2025, the Bridwell Press has published 15 titles, ranging from poetry and photography to books on Italian religious history and translations of 18th century Greek letters to John Wesley. Discussions about publishing at SMU continued for several years and an opportunity arose to consider new ways of knowledge production in Bridwell Library. The new Bridwell Press sought to explore novel ways of approaching publishing, encouraging different areas of scholarship and promoting new poetry. In the first year the press published two books, including the popular The Antediluvian Librarians' Secrets for Success in Seminary and Theology School by Jane Lenz Elder, Duane Harbin, and David Schmersal (and illustrated by Rebecca Howdeshell). The book was a collaboration by Bridwell and Perkins School of Theology staff, who had several years of experience working with student writing success. The other book was a book of recipes by the renowned theologian Schubert Ogden. In 2023, two books were published by distinguished scholars Roberto Mangabeira Unger of Harvard University and Marc H. Ellis (1952–2024), retired university professor of Jewish Studies at Baylor University.

In 2024, three titles were published within the new Methodist Studies series: Mixing Oil and Water: the Beginnings of Chautauqua at Fair Point by Richard P. Heitzenrater; John Heyl Vincent's Reminiscences by Timothy S. Binkley; and The Autobiography of the Rev. William Stevenson edited by Ted Campbell. Around the same time, Bridwell Press partnered with the SMU English Department and its poetry division, under the leadership of Dr. David Caplan, who founded the new initiative called Project Poëtica. In Fall 2024, initial talks began with the NYU Global Italian Religious Networks (GLIRN) initiative to consider Bridwell Press as the publisher for the international research collective. GLIRN comprises more than 15 institutional partners, many in Italy, who work on a variety of research projects related to Italian religious history, but more specifically according to their mission: GLIRN "promotes the academic study and public discussion on the history of Italian religious cultures and their global implications. It investigates Italian religious history as a continuous dialogue between Italy and the outside world and, as such, it aims to reconstruct the movements of peoples and ideas that have shaped it." By December 2024, GLIRN approved Bridwell Press as its official publisher, and in October 2025, Bridwell Press published its first double-blind peer reviewed GLIRN title, The Ruin of Souls: A Religious History of Italian Catholic Immigrants in the United States (1853–1921) by Massimo Di Gioacchino.

With the collaboration with both Project Poëtica and GLIRN, the operations of Bridwell Press accelerated, along with other partnerships, initiatives, and series. The number of series now includes more than a dozen topical divisions, of which more than half have been established with standing Editorial Boards run by academic specialists in their fields rather than traditional acquisitions editors. There is one journal in church music, Journal of Praise & Worship, which was officially launched at Oxford University on August 5, 2025, and will publish its first annual issue in spring 2026. The other established series include: East and Central Asian Studies; Sources for Translation in Christian Studies; Early Spanish Colonial Texts in Translation; Cambodian Cultural Heritage & Language; Travels in Translation; and Medieval Japanese Classics. Recent books of poetry have been reviewed in the Bay Area Reporter (Tilt / Beautiful People) and the Harvard Divinity Bulletin (Erase Genesis). Luisa Muradyan's poem “When I Say I Am Not the Speaker of My Poems," featured in her book published by Bridwell Press (I Make Jokes When I'm Devastated, 2025) won the Copper Nickel Editor's Choice Prize for Issue 40. In December 2025, Bridwell Press published its first book of photography, by distinguished Dallas photographer Carolyn Brown, titled Time: Sojourns in Stone and Light, which had an accompanying exhibit and book launch at the Dallas Architecture and Design Exchange (ADEX) on December 2.

The Press is currently staffed by the founding director, Anthony Elia, the operations manager, and the managing editor, who oversee daily operations. In June 2026, Bridwell Press formerly joined the Library Publishing Coalition, and was a co-sponsor at the 2026 LPC conference in Seattle, WA.

In 2027, several major works, including the definitive English translation of a medieval classic Campaigns of Chinggis Qan (trans. by Christopher P. Atwood, 2,400 pp. Vols I-IV) will be published.

== See also ==
- List of English-language book publishing companies
- List of university presses
