= Robert Stewart Hyer =

1st President of Southern Methodist University
- In office 1911–1920
- Succeeded by: Hiram Boaz

4th President of Southwestern University
- In office 1898–1911
- Preceded by: John H. McLean
- Succeeded by: Charles M. Bishop

Personal details
- Born: October 18, 1860 Oxford, Georgia
- Died: May 29, 1929 (aged 68) Dallas, Texas
- Spouse: Maggie Hudgins
- Education: Emory College

Robert Stewart Hyer (October 18, 1860 – May 29, 1929) was an educator and researcher in Texas noted for experimenting with early X-ray and telegraphy equipment. He served as president of Southwestern University before becoming the first president of Southern Methodist University. Hyer Elementary School in University Park, Texas, is named in his honor.

== Early life and education ==
Robert Stewart Hyer was born in Oxford, Georgia, in 1860. He attended elementary school in Atlanta before receiving a bachelor's and master's degree at Emory College in 1881 and 1882 where he was a Member of the Chi Phi fraternity. He later received honorary degrees from Central Methodist University and Baylor University.

== Academic career ==
=== Hyer at Southwestern ===
Hyer followed fellow Emory graduates Claude C. Cody and Morgan Callaway, Jr. to Southwestern University in Georgetown, Texas, where he served as a physics professor from 1882 to 1911. In 1894, Hyer built and tested a device that transmitted wireless messages from his laboratory to the city jail. (This early work on the wireless telegraph was contemporaneous with and independent of Guglielmo Marconi's work in Italy and Nikola Tesla's work in New York). He also experimented with X-ray technology and demonstrated it to scientific and medical conferences across Texas in 1896 and 1897.

Hyer became university president in 1897 and oversaw a major construction campaign, the university's move to its current location east of Maple Street, increases in the endowment and student population, and the establishment of a fine arts school and medical college. When the Methodist Episcopal Church, South approached Southwestern with a proposal to relocate the university to Dallas, Texas, in the early 1910s, Hyer strongly supported relocating the university, even as trustees and faculty grew hostile to the proposal. When Southwestern rejected relocation, Hyer resigned as president in 1911 and moved to Dallas to work toward establishing a new university.

=== Founding of Southern Methodist ===
Serving as one of the founders of Southern Methodist University, Hyer set to work planning the campus, selecting the school colors, and directing the architectural design of the university's first building, Dallas Hall. He served as university president from 1911 until 1920 when he was asked to resign amid financial uncertainties. He continued teaching physics at SMU until his death in 1929.

Before his death, Hyer applied for a patent for the "resistograph" he invented to locate oil in West Texas and was elected a member of the Phi Beta Kappa chapter at Emory University in recognition of his scientific achievements.
