= Ballard Designs =

American retail company

- Formation: 1983
- Headquarters: 1670 Defoor Ave. NW, Atlanta, GA 30318-7562
- President: Karen Mooney
- Website: https://www.ballarddesigns.com

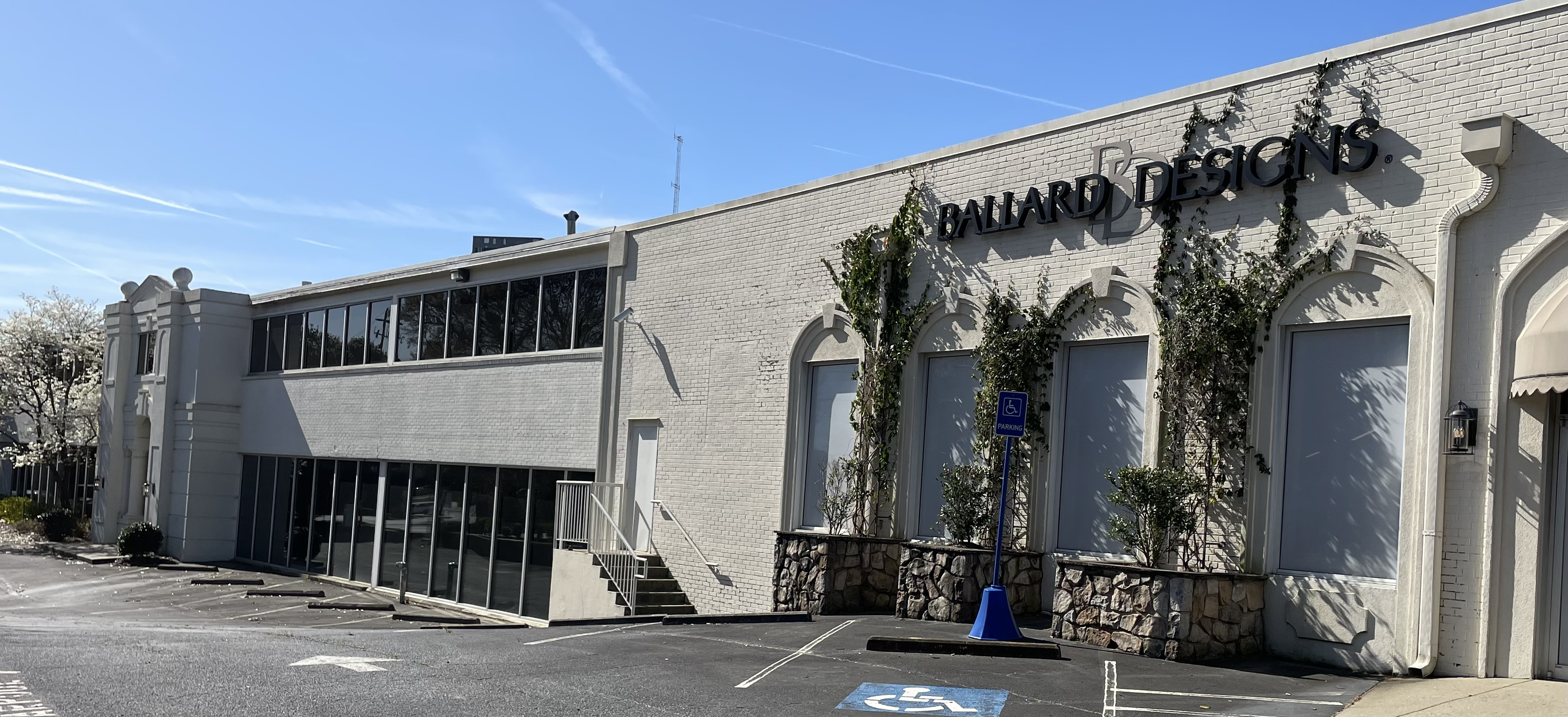
Ballard Designs corporate headquarters located in west Atlanta.

Ballard Designs is an omnichannel retail company that designs and sells home furniture and accessories with a European influence. Formally part of Cornerstone Brands, a subsidiary of HSN Inc. (NASDAQ: HSNI), the company is now one of the Qurate Retail portfolio brands, collectively owned by Qurate Retail Group (NASDAQ: QRTEA, QRTEB). There are currently 17 retail stores: Three in Florida (Tampa, Jacksonville and a design studio concept in West Palm Beach), Oak Brook, Illinois, King of Prussia, Pennsylvania, Natick, Massachusetts, Atlanta, Georgia (where the company's flagship store opened in 2018), Mount Pleasant, South Carolina, Denver, Colorado, Tysons Corner, Virginia, Garden City, New York, Charlotte, North Carolina, Nashville, Tennessee, and four in Texas (Dallas, Fort Worth, Houston, and Austin). There are also three outlet stores: one near its corporate headquarters in Atlanta, Georgia, one near its distribution center in West Chester, Ohio, and a third in Louisville, Kentucky. The company's Margate, Florida outlet closed in 2020. Other locations are slated to open in 2024 including Greenville, South Carolina.

== History ==
Ballard Designs was founded in 1983 by Helen Ballard. Ballard got her start in the retail industry after winning Metropolitan Home magazine's home decorating contest. When the photos of her Ansley Park condo were published, more than 500 readers contacted the magazine asking where they could buy Ballard's furniture and accessories, especially a dolphin-based table. A year later, Ballard quit her job, sold her home and started Ballard Designs. The first catalog was a two-page black-and-white brochure featuring a replica of the dolphin-based table from her home. It became Ballard Designs' first big seller.

In 1996 Ballard Designs merged with Cornerstone Brands, publisher of several home and apparel catalogs, including Frontgate, Garnet Hill and Smith+Noble. Cornerstone Brands was acquired by IAC/InterActive Corp in 2005 and later became a subsidiary of HSN, Inc. In 2007, Ballard Designs opened its first retail store in Tampa and expanded less than a year later to Jacksonville.

Ballard continued to serve as Chief Executive Officer of Ballard Designs until she retired in 2002. She also served as a member of the Board of Directors of Cornerstone Brands.

In 2010, the company partnered with designer Suzanne Kasler to create its first designer collection. In December 2012, Ballard Designs launched the Ballard+ app, an augmented reality shopping application developed by Marxent Labs which allows consumers to interact with the Ballard Designs catalog using their iOS device. The app has since been discontinued and replaced with an online 3D room planning tool enabling customers to see what Ballard Designs products will look like in their space. In 2014, renowned interior designer and entertaining expert, Bunny Williams, became the second major designer to offer a signature collection under the Ballard Designs brand. Internationally noted designer Miles Redd was welcomed by the brand in 2017 with a collection of furniture and accessories inspired by classic architecture and old Hollywood. That same year, Ballard's parent company, HSN Inc., was acquired by Liberty Interactive, owner of QVC Home Shopping Network. Liberty Interactive was renamed Qurate Retail Group in 2018.

Today, Ballard Designs circulates more than 19 million catalogs annually, operates an e-commerce website, and maintains a decorating blog and podcast under the name, How To Decorate. Since its premiere in October 2016, the podcast as recorded more than 290 episodes featuring leading designers, taste makers, and the latest trends in interior design.

On April 15, 2026, parent company QVC Group warned that it was preparing to file for Chapter 11 bankruptcy as soon as the end of that day, citing steadily viewer declines and debt burdens. QVC Group plans to enter a prepackaged restructuring support agreement with its creditors and exit Chapter 11 bankruptcy within no later than 90 days, or by around July 2026. On April 16, QVC Group filed for Chapter 11 bankruptcy protection in the United States District Court for the Southern District of Texas with plans to reduce over $5 billion in long-term debt, which will allow for the company to continue operating while having over $1 billion in debt remaining.
