= John O. Beaty =

American academic and anti-communist activist (1890–1961)

John Owen Beaty (December 22, 1890 – September 9, 1961) was an American academic, anti-communist, and antisemitic activist.

== Biography ==
Beaty was born in Crow, West Virginia. He studied for his B.A. and M.A. at the University of Virginia, and completed a Ph.D. in philosophy at Columbia University in 1921. He taught English at Southern Methodist University (SMU), from 1919 (becoming a full professor in 1922) until his retirement in 1957, having been appointed by SMU's first president, Robert Hyer. Beaty served in active duty during World War II in the Military Intelligence Service, and became a Lieutenant Colonel in the U.S. Army. He was a member of Phi Beta Kappa, the Texas Institute of Letters, the American Legion, and was president of the Conference of College Teachers of English.

He married Josephine Mason Powell in 1920; they had four children. He was a Baptist and a member of the Order of the White Cross, the Masonic Order, and the Woodmen of the World. After retirement he moved to Barboursville, Orange County, Virginia, and died in September 1961.

== Views and controversies ==
His 1951 book, The Iron Curtain over America (hailed by Gerald L.K. Smith as "the greatest of its kind ever to appear in print") and an anti-communist pamphlet, How to Capture a University were controversial during the early 1950s. Beaty was accused of antisemitism and bad scholarship. He argued that Communism was a Jewish conspiracy, that the Truman administration was not doing enough to counter it, and that universities (including his own Southern Methodist University (SMU) were being infiltrated by Communist and "powerful, non-Christian elements in our population." The Jewish Telegraphic Agency described The Iron Curtain as a "violently anti-Semitic volume":

The book, which denies that Jews stemming from East Europe are descendants of Abraham, Isaac and Jacob, questions Israel's bid for restitution from Germany and seeks to deny that the Nazis exterminated most of European Jewry. The bulk of East European Jews, according to Prof. Beaty, escaped ahead of the Nazis into Soviet Russia. Some of them today, he said, may be part of “the Jewish force on the Iranian frontier.” Others, he asserts, “form the hard core of the new ruling bureaucracy in satellite countries.”

He also alleged that Israel's 1948 war of independence was Soviet-backed and displaced 880,000 Palestinians. According to Time magazine, the book promoted the Khazar hypothesis:

the Khazars also practically captured the Democratic Party, helped drive the U.S. into an "unnecessary war" with Germany ("the historic bulwark of Christian Europe"), watched with cruel calm the slaughter of "as many as possible of the world-ruling and Khazar-hated race of 'Aryans.'"

According to Beaty, "the Khazar Jews were responsible for all of America's – and the world's ills," beginning with World War I. The book was promoted by former Wall Street broker and oil tycoon J. Russell Maguire.

How to Capture a University asked, "Are the minds of our students to be guided by B'nai B'rith... or by Soviet Moscow... or by assorted devotees of the little world power which usurps the name of 'Israel'?" His teaching was also reported to be antisemitic. His claims were about universities were investigated by a committee at SMU and found to be baseless and antisemitic, the university's board of trustees subsequently voted to censure him.

Beaty also wrote the introduction to a 1953 antisemitic pamphlet by California State Senator Jack B. Tenney, Zion's Trojan Horse. He wrote another antisemitic pamphlet in 1954, The Cry of "Anti-Semitic", which alleged that his accusers were acting in bad faith.

== Bibliography ==
Beaty published fourteen books, including Race and Population, Their Relation to World Peace (1928), Swords in the Dawn (1937), Image of Life (1940), The Iron Curtain over America (1951, Wilkinson Publishing, Dallas, Texas) and Crossroads. He co-edited Facts and Ideas and Famous Editions of English Poets and worked with the Modern Language Association of America and the Dictionary of American Biography. Russel B. Nye reviewed Image of Life favorably, describing its thesis that Anglo-Saxon ideals were under threat from "decadent sentimentalism" as "controversial".
