= Wright Amendment =

Act of Congress

- Long title: An Act to amend the Federal Aviation Act of 1958 in order to promote competition in international air transportation, provide greater opportunities for United States air carriers, establish goals for developing United States international aviation negotiating policy, and for other purposes.
- Acronyms (colloquial): IATCA
- Enacted by: the 96th United States Congress
- Effective: February 15, 1980

Citations
- Public law: 96-192
- Statutes at Large: 94 Stat. 35 aka 94 Stat. 48

Codification
- Acts amended: Federal Aviation Act of 1958
- Titles amended: 49 U.S.C.: Transportation
- U.S.C. sections amended: 49 U.S.C. § 40102 aka § 1301

Legislative history
- Introduced in the Senate as S. 1300 by Howard Cannon (D-NV) on June 7, 1979; Committee consideration by Senate Commerce, Science, and Transportation, House Public Works and Transportation; Passed the Senate on September 29, 1979 (passed); Passed the House on November 13, 1979 (passed, in lieu of H.R. 5481); Reported by the joint conference committee on December 19, 1979; agreed to by the Senate on January 31, 1980 (agreed) and by the House on February 4, 1980 (agreed); Signed into law by President Jimmy Carter on February 15, 1980

The Wright Amendment of 1979 was a United States federal law that governed traffic at Dallas Love Field, an airport in Dallas, Texas, to protect Dallas Fort Worth International Airport (DFW) from competition. The amendment—enacted in reaction to the refusal of Southwest Airlines to vacate Love Field and move to DFW—prohibited carriers from operating full-size airliners between Love Field and destinations beyond Texas and its four neighboring states. Further amendments in 1997 and 2005 added new states and relaxed aircraft rules for longer range service. The law was partially repealed in 2006 and then fully repealed in 2014.

== Background ==
By the early 1960s, Love Field was reaching the limits of its terminal and parking capacity despite repeated expansion projects, and its runways were too short to accommodate new intercontinental jets. Greater Southwest International Airport (GSIA or GSW) had been constructed in Fort Worth in the 1950s, but efforts to share the new airport had proven unsuccessful due to the entrenched rivalry between the two cities. The situation was inefficient and hampered airline service to both cities, and in 1964, the Civil Aeronautics Board (CAB) ordered Dallas and Fort Worth to find a site for a new joint regional airport. However, many Dallas residents remained satisfied with Love Field, and an attempt to establish an independent Dallas Fort Worth Regional Airport Authority—despite strong backing from the Dallas Chamber of Commerce and Dallas mayor J. Erik Jonsson—failed when Dallas voters rejected the proposal by a narrow margin. After further negotiation, the cities instead established an appointed airport board consisting of seven members from Dallas and four from Fort Worth, and were able to persuade all eight existing air carriers at Love and GSW to move to the new regional airport.

To protect the regional airport from competition and thereby protect bond investments, the cities of Dallas and Fort Worth signed the Regional Airport Concurrent Bond Ordinance on 12 November 1968, which reads in part:

It is acknowledged and understood by the cities that they, in Love Field, Redbird, GSIA and Meacham Field, own and operate airports which by their nature are potentially competitive with the operation of the Regional Airport (...) Accordingly the cities (...) shall take such steps as may be necessary, appropriate and legally permissible, to provide for the orderly, efficient and effective phase-out at Love Field, Redbird, GSIA and Meacham Field, of any and all certified air carrier services, and to transfer such activities to the Regional Airport effective upon the beginning of operations at the Regional Airport.

This effort culminated in the closure and ultimate demolition of GSW, the 1974 opening of Dallas-Fort Worth International Airport (originally named Dallas-Fort Worth Regional Airport, or DFW for short), the closure of Love Field to certified air carriers, and a corresponding effort to redevelop Love to be used primarily for corporate aviation.

Southwest Airlines (originally Air Southwest) was founded after the 1968 agreement between the airlines and cities to relocate to DFW; it was not a party to the agreement and felt that its business model, which emphasized convenience, would be hindered by a long drive to the new airport. Before DFW's opening, Southwest filed suit to remain at Love Field, claiming that no legal basis existed to close the airport to commercial service and that it was not bound by an agreement it did not sign. In 1971, Southwest obtained an operating certificate from the Texas Aeronautics Commission (TAC) for intrastate flights, claiming that the CAB had no authority over flights that did not cross state borders; however, Southwest was quickly sued by Dallas, Fort Worth, and the DFW Airport Board, who contested this assertion, claiming that the 1964 CAB ruling also applied to the new carrier. In 1973, a federal district court ruled that Southwest's proposed intrastate service fell outside of CAB jurisdiction, and so long as Love Field remained open, the City of Dallas could not preclude Southwest from operating there.

When DFW opened in 1974, every airline except Southwest moved to the new airport, drastically reducing commercial flights at Love Field.

== Passage of the Wright Amendment ==
After the Airline Deregulation Act was enacted in 1978, Southwest Airlines announced plans to begin interstate service in 1979 with flights to New Orleans, a proposal that was quickly endorsed by the CAB. However, Texas officials—particularly those from Fort Worth—thought that increased traffic at Love Field could draw flights away from DFW Airport and threaten its financial stability. To protect the new airport, Jim Wright, member of the U.S. House of Representatives serving Fort Worth, sponsored and helped pass an amendment to the International Air Transportation Act of 1979 in Congress that restricted passenger air traffic at Love Field in the following ways:

- Passenger service flown with larger mainline jet aircraft could be provided only to airports within Texas and its four neighboring U.S. states: Arkansas, Louisiana, New Mexico and Oklahoma. At the time, all existing and planned Southwest Airlines routes were contained within this region, so the law had no immediate effect on Southwest.
- Flights to other states were allowed only on aircraft with 56 seats or fewer, in an attempt to prohibit mainline passenger service outside of the five-state region.
- Airlines could not offer connecting flights, through service on another airline, or through ticketing beyond the five-state region.

While the law deterred major airlines from starting (or resuming) service out of Love Field, Southwest quickly expanded its Love Field operation by undercutting the high fares charged by legacy airlines to fly to smaller, underserved airports in the five-state region. This had the effect of increasing local traffic to non-Wright Amendment-impacted airports such as Houston/Hobby Airport, El Paso International Airport, Albuquerque International Sunport, and New Orleans International Airport.

The through-ticketing and connecting flight restrictions in the law were not seriously explored until Continental Airlines proposed in 1985 to begin service between Love Field and Houston. Dallas, Fort Worth, and the D/FW Airport Board attempted to bar the airline from Love Field on the grounds that it offered interline through-ticketing, a service not offered by Southwest. However, the United States Department of Transportation (USDOT) decreed that an airline was merely disallowed from through-ticketing flight segments to or from Love Field. Additionally, the USDOT ruled that selling a passenger a separate ticket on a connecting flight at another airport—a practice known as double ticketing—was perfectly legal provided that the airline was not "advertising, promoting, or otherwise affirmatively soliciting double ticketing passengers." An airline was thus allowed to sell a connecting ticket provided that it was requested by the traveler rather than being solicited by the ticket agent. Following this ruling, a sophisticated Southwest passenger could work the system and get around the Wright Amendment's restrictions by flying from Dallas to another airport in the five-state region, changing planes, and then flying on a separate ticket to any city Southwest served.

== Alterations and bypass efforts ==
=== 1989 alteration proposal ===
The Wright Amendment became controversial in Dallas; some argued that it unfairly restricted airline competition by discouraging carriers other than Southwest from serving Love Field, while others supported it to mitigate jet noise and protect property values near the airport. By late 1989, Dallas City Council member Jerry Bartos emerged as a leader of the effort to repeal Wright, gaining the backing of mayor Annette Strauss, and Kansas U.S. House Rep. Dan Glickman sponsored a bill calling for the amendment's repeal. In September of that year, the Dallas City Council approved a compromise resolution calling for the amendment's four-state limit to be changed to a 650 mi (1,050 km) perimeter limit allowing direct flights to Denver and Nashville. By 1990, Southwest was supportive of the resolution, but it had galvanized opposition by local property owners, and DFW Airport supporters were alarmed by a declaration by American Airlines that it could cancel a proposed terminal project there and move many flights to Love. In early July, Texas members of the U.S. House Rules Committee blocked Glickman's bill, Strauss withdrew her support, and the City Council rescinded their 1989 vote.

=== Legend Airlines and Shelby Amendment ===
In 1996, Dallas aviation company Dalfort Aviation announced the launch of Legend Airlines, a new air carrier that would operate long-range flights from Love Field using jets with 56 seats—the maximum number allowed for long-haul flights under Wright. The new airline would be headed by T. Allan McArtor and would use refurbished McDonnell Douglas DC-9s or Boeing 727s—aircraft that normally carried 90 or more passengers—with an all-first class configuration and the excess space used for cargo. McArtor and Dalfort chief executive Bruce Leadbetter claimed that buying new regional jets with 56 or fewer seats was too expensive and would not provide Dalfort with much-needed overhaul business. However, the USDOT general counsel ruled in September 1996 that the 56-seat restriction applied to the "designed capacity" of an airliner rather than to the number of seats actually installed, prompting Legend to seek a change in the law; Texas Rep. Joe Barton was soon calling for the U.S. House to address the 56-seat requirement.

By July 1997, McArtor had enlisted the help of Senator Richard Shelby of Alabama, who proposed to change to Wright restrictions to allow Legend to start service using the refurbished planes; however, he was opposed by Texas senator Kay Bailey Hutchison. On 7 October 1997, despite fierce opposition from Hutchison and Rep. Kay Granger of Fort Worth, Shelby's efforts culminated in the passage of a Senate funding bill that included his amendment to allow unrestricted flights to Alabama, Kansas, and Mississippi and to allow nationwide flights using aircraft reconfigured with 56 seats. On 9 October 1997, the U.S. House overwhelmingly approved the transportation funding bill containing the Shelby Amendment, with President Bill Clinton expected to promptly sign it into law.

=== Legal actions ===
The passage of the Shelby Amendment prompted a flurry of lawsuits. Within a month, Fort Worth and Dallas had sued each other, with Fort Worth arguing for upholding the 1968 bond agreement and Dallas arguing that it could no longer be enforced. A few months later, American Airlines joined Fort Worth in suing Dallas, and McArtor accused American of masterminding Fort Worth's original lawsuit to attain American's goal of stopping Legend. By February 1998, Mesa Airlines, which had begun intrastate service from Meacham Field in May 1997, had joined Fort Worth, and Southwest Airlines joined the Dallas lawsuit at the behest of Legend.

On 19 May 1998, Continental Airlines—a party to the original 1968 bond agreement—and its regional affiliate Continental Express sued both cities over their refusal to allow interstate service at Love Field using 50-seat Embraer ERJ-145s, which fit within the 56-seat restriction. The lawsuit argued that the cities no longer had the authority to block long-haul service that complied with federal law. This in turn prompted DFW Airport to preemptively sue American Airlines to prevent them from likewise operating from Love, even though the airline denied having plans to do so.

McArtor argued that Fort Worth was also violating the bond agreement by allowing Mesa and FedEx Express to operate from Meacham and the recently constructed Fort Worth Alliance Airport respectively. In October 1998, Legend sued Fort Worth, accusing the city of a "double standard" in its simultaneous support for Alliance and opposition to expansion at Love. However, State District Judge Bob McCoy dismissed the suit later that month on the grounds that Legend was not a party to the 1968 DFW bond agreement and thus lacked standing to sue.

=== New service starts ===
Dallas and Fort Worth's efforts to block Continental Express were unsuccessful; the carrier began intrastate flights between Love Field and George Bush Intercontinental Airport in Houston on 11 June 1998, becoming only the third airline to start new service at Love after the 1968 bond agreement, following Southwest and the defunct Muse Air. On 10 February 2000, a federal judge lifted an injunction against the airline's proposed interstate service to Cleveland, and the airline announced that the service would begin on 1 June.

On 5 April 2000, after further legal battles against Fort Worth and American Airlines and delays in gaining final approval from the FAA, Legend began the first long-haul service from Love Field since 1974 with a flight to Washington Dulles International Airport in a refurbished 56-seat McDonnell Douglas DC-9. Legend soon operated scheduled passenger service nonstop from Love Field to Los Angeles (LAX), New York LaGuardia Airport (LGA), Las Vegas (LAS), and Dulles (IAD). On 1 May 2000, American Airlines launched a direct challenge to Legend with its first flights from Love Field since 1974, starting service with Fokker 100s specially refitted with 56 first-class seats and offering flights to Chicago and Los Angeles.

On 29 June 2000, the United States Supreme Court declined to review a federal appeals court decision allowing long-haul flights from Love, effectively ending the last attempt by Fort Worth, the D/FW Airport Board, and American Airlines to stop such flights. Board officials stated that they would not pursue further legal action.

Despite the Shelby Amendment, Southwest did not add flights to the new states, citing a lack of demand.

=== Missouri added ===
In 2005, Senator Kit Bond of Missouri attached an amendment to a transportation spending bill to exempt his state from the Wright restrictions. Soon after the bill's passage, Southwest began nonstop flights from Love Field to St. Louis and Kansas City on 13 December 2005. The same day, American Airlines responded with an announcement that it would start service from Love Field to the same Missouri airports on 2 March 2006, along with flights to the Southwest strongholds of San Antonio and Austin, Texas.

== Repeal efforts ==
In late 2004, Southwest Airlines announced its opposition to the Wright Amendment. Shortly thereafter, the company began trying to garner public support for the repeal of the Wright Amendment by launching a massive public relations campaign. Print media, the Internet, billboards, and TV spots were all used, directing the viewer or reader to visit the Set Love Free website, created by Southwest Airlines. In response, a group opposed to the repeal of the amendment, spearheaded by the DFW Airport Board and American Airlines, launched their own media campaign directing visitors to their Keep DFW Strong site.

Critics of the amendment asserted that the restrictions on long-haul travel from Dallas Love Field were anti-competitive. They asked for the "freedom to fly" from Love Field to any destination. They also argued that the restrictions on full use of Love Field artificially inflated fares at the DFW Airport. They believed that eliminating the amendment, and thus allowing any airline to fly long-haul service out of Love Field, would allow the so-called "Southwest effect" to occur, where new, inexpensive capacity will increase traffic at both airports (assuming that the market effect of low fares on flights into and out of Love Field will serve to drive down fares on corresponding routes at DFW); these projections are based upon historic results in other air travel markets in which low-fare carriers, most frequently, Southwest, have initiated service. Wright opponents also argued that DFW's main tenant, American Airlines, could charge high prices out of DFW because with AA controlling in excess of 80% of air carrier traffic at DFW, there was little competition on most routes, a problem that has recently been attributed to Delta Air Lines discontinuing its usage of DFW as a hub.

Supporters of the amendment said that DFW Airport is the economic engine of the metroplex area, and did not wish for a competing airport to either take traffic from DFW or drive the prices down there, although they did concede that American's fares are often higher than from other airports. DFW Airport had also completed construction of a $2.5-billion people mover system to transport passengers between terminal buildings. The DFW Airport Authority stated concerns that the financial burdens caused by large infrastructure projects such as the people mover project and the removal of Delta Air Lines' hub status would hamper airport profitability and sustainability if a direct competitor to DFW were introduced into the Dallas-Fort Worth Metroplex. A primary concern of many in the DFW area was that American was the largest employer in the North Texas area and associates of DFW and American Airlines were reluctant to put any jobs at risk, especially when considering the chronic financial difficulties that modern airlines, other than Southwest, face. Another concern of people in the immediate area of the airport was that of noise and traffic; the area near Love Field, especially the incorporated "Park Cities" (University Park and Highland Park) and the "Uptown" section of Dallas, has become high-value real estate, and developers and residents feared that increased air and street traffic into the airport, and increased fuel loads for interstate flights requiring higher takeoff throttles and lower rates of ascent, would lessen the desirability and thus land values of the area.

=== Repeal compromise ===
On June 15, 2006, it was announced that American, Southwest, DFW Airport and the cities of Dallas and Fort Worth had all agreed to seek full repeal of the Wright Amendment, with several conditions. The ban on nonstop flights outside the Wright zone would stay in place until 2014; through-ticketing to domestic and foreign airports (allowing connecting flights to long-haul destinations without requiring the previous workaround of buying separate tickets) would be allowed immediately; Love Field's maximum gate capacity would be lowered from 32 to 20 gates; and Love would handle only domestic flights non-stop.

The proposed compromise was opposed by JetBlue Airways and other low-fare carriers, who argued that the gate reductions at Love would harm their ability to begin service there, and by area congressmen who opposed provisions of the deal that they believed would restrict competition in passenger service at other airports within an 80-mile (130 km) radius of DFW and Love, including Collin County Regional Airport in the nearby city of McKinney. The compromise was also opposed by Love Field Terminal Partners, owners of the old Legend Airlines terminal. They claimed that the announcement of the compromise prevented them from selling the six gate terminal to Pinnacle Airlines who had shown interest in purchasing or leasing the gates and have several lawsuits to prevent the compromise's implementation.

On July 25, 2006, a leaked memorandum from an employee of the United States Department of Justice Antitrust Division raised concerns about airline competition in North Texas and urged legislators to force a renegotiation of the deal. It also stated that the removal of gates and a cap of 20 gates for the airport would violate federal antitrust legislation. This capping of gates would affect the other airlines that might be attracted to getting gates at Dallas Love Field airport.

Sen. Kay Bailey Hutchison responded to the memorandum by stating "They [Justice] are not taking a position at all on the legislation... That memo did not go through the channels. And it probably was one person's view, but it's not the Justice Department's."

House Judiciary Committee Chairman James Sensenbrenner also had some complaints about the antitrust issues that he thought would arise from the proposed legislation since Southwest would be able to operate from 16 gates, American 2 gates, and Continental 2 gates without further gates available for other carriers.

After extensive negotiations with the House and Senate Judiciary Committees, the compromise bill passed both Houses of Congress on Friday, September 29, 2006, just before the 109th Congress adjourned for the November elections. Hutchison led the effort to pass the bill in the Senate while Rep. Kay Granger led a bipartisan Texas House coalition to see the bill through to a successful conclusion in the House. President George W. Bush signed the bill into law on October 13, 2006, including the 20-gate cap. Southwest and American then required approval from the Federal Aviation Administration to begin one-stop flights from Love Field to destinations outside the Wright limits.

While non-stop flights were restricted until October 16, 2014, Southwest Airlines announced on October 17, 2006, that it would begin direct flight (same plane with one stop) and connecting service between Love Field and 25 destinations outside the Wright zone on October 19, 2006. American Airlines also made indirect connecting travel between Love Field and locations outside the Wright zone available by October 18, 2006.

== Expiration ==
On October 13, 2014, the Wright Amendment domestic flight restrictions ended, allowing airlines to fly from Love Field to anywhere in the U.S. The event was marked by the arrival of Southwest Airlines Flight 1013 from Denver at 7:51 am that day.

Although the major restrictions on domestic flights were lifted, Love Field continues to be governed by the complex Five Party Agreement executed in 2006 between the cities of Dallas and Fort Worth, DFW Airport, Southwest Airlines, and American Airlines as a precondition of their mutual support for the amendment's repeal. The total number of gates at Love Field is restricted to only 20 and the city of Dallas agreed to formulate a new airport master plan and demolish all gates in excess of that number "as soon as practical"; Southwest and American were given preferential leases to the remaining gates. Dallas agreed to impose a noise curfew prohibiting airline flights at Love Field between 11 pm and 6 am local time. Until 2025, airlines may only operate international flights to the Dallas–Fort Worth metroplex from DFW, and if Southwest Airlines or any of its codeshare agreement partners offer flights from any airport within an 80-mile (130 km) radius of Love Field (which encompasses DFW Airport), Southwest must surrender Love Field gates. The parties agreed to oppose the initiation of passenger service from any other airport within the metroplex before that time.

The repeal of the amendment had an immediate and substantial effect on traffic at Love Field; emplanements at the airport rose sharply from 8.4 million in 2013 to 14.5 million in 2015.

== Text of amendment ==
The original text of the Wright Amendment (from International Air Transportation Competition Act):

(a) Except as provided in subsection (c), notwithstanding any other provision of law, neither the Secretary of Transportation, the Civil Aeronautics Board, nor any other officer or employee of the United States shall issue, reissue, amend, revise, or otherwise modify (either by action or inaction) any certificate or other authority to permit or otherwise authorize any person to provide the transportation of individuals, by air, as a common carrier for compensation or hire between Love Field, Texas, and one or more points outside the State of Texas, except (1) charter air transportation not to exceed ten flights per month, and (2) air transportation provided by commuter airlines operating aircraft with a passenger capacity of 56 passengers or less.

(b) Except as provided in subsections (a) and (c), notwithstanding any other provision of law, or any certificate or other authority heretofore or hereafter issued thereunder, no person shall provide or offer to provide the transportation of individuals, by air, for compensation or hire as a common carrier between Love Field, Texas, and one or more points outside the State of Texas, except that a person providing service to a point outside of Texas from Love Field on November 1, 1979 may continue to provide service to such point.

(c) Subsections (a) and (b) shall not apply with respect to, and it is found consistent with the public convenience and necessity to authorize, transportation of individuals, by air, on a flight between Love Field, Texas, and one or more points within the States of Louisiana, Arkansas, Oklahoma, New Mexico, and Texas by an air carrier, if (1) such air carrier does not offer or provide any through service or ticketing with another air carrier or foreign air carrier, and (2) such air carrier does not offer for sale transportation to or from, and the flight or aircraft does not serve, any point which is outside any such State. Nothing in this subsection shall be construed to give authority not otherwise provided by law to the Secretary of Transportation, the Civil Aeronautics Board, any other officer or employee of the United States, or any other person.

(d) This section shall not take effect if enacted after the enactment of the Aviation Safety and Noise Abatement Act of 1979.
