= KAFW =

KAFW may refer to:

- the ICAO code for Fort Worth Alliance Airport
- KAFW-LP, a defunct low-power television station (channel 48) formerly licensed to Abilene, Texas, United States
