= Legend Airlines =

United States airline

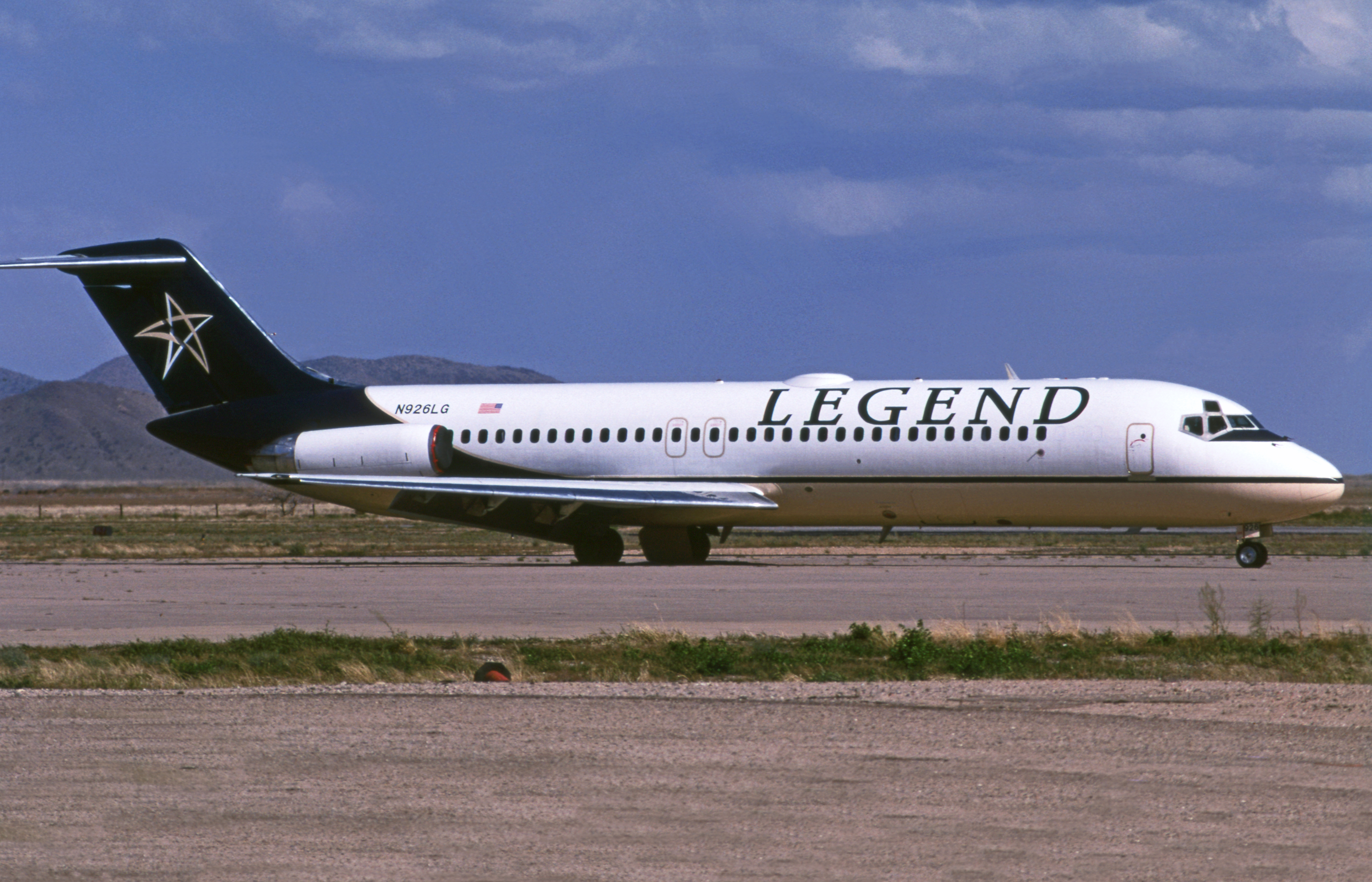
- Former Legend Airlines McDonnell Douglas DC-9-32 in storage at Kingman Airport in August 2001
IATA	ICAO	Call sign
LC	LGD	LEGENDARY
- Founded: 1996; 30 years ago
- Commenced operations: April 5, 2000; 25 years ago
- Ceased operations: 2001; 25 years ago
- Hubs: Dallas
- Fleet size: 7
- Destinations: 5
- Headquarters: Dallas Love Field; Dallas, Texas
- Key people: T. Allan McArtor
- Employees: 400
- Website: http://legendairlines.com

Legend Airlines was an airline headquartered at Dallas Love Field in Dallas, Texas, United States. Legend operated nonstop flights from its Love Field hub to Washington, D.C.; Las Vegas; Los Angeles; and New York City, the first carrier to fly from Love Field to destinations beyond the Wright Amendment five-state region after the opening of Dallas/Fort Worth International Airport in 1974. Legend's aircraft were limited to 56 passenger seats by the Wright Amendment, so the aircraft were outfitted in a spacious all-business class layout, aiming at the lucrative business travel market.

Legend's initial flights were substantially delayed by lobbying to persuade Congress to modify the Wright Amendment, court battles instigated by American Airlines and the city of Fort Worth, and by difficulties obtaining operational approval from the Federal Aviation Administration (FAA). Flights began in April 2000, but were suspended indefinitely in December 2000 due to mounting losses, with the airline filing for bankruptcy. Efforts to secure additional financing and restart flights came to naught; the airline surrendered its air operator's certificate and was liquidated in mid-2001.

The airline's private Love Field terminal—which was independently owned and leased to the carrier—was condemned under eminent domain and the gates razed after the 2006 Wright Amendment repeal imposed a 20-gate cap at the airport. These events triggered a series of lawsuits that were not fully settled until 2016.

== History ==
=== Background ===
By the early 1960s, Love Field was reaching the limits of its capacity, and efforts to share Greater Southwest International Airport (GSW) in Fort Worth had proven unsuccessful. The situation was inefficient, and in 1964, the Civil Aeronautics Board (CAB) ordered Dallas and Fort Worth to establish a new joint regional airport. The cities and airlines ultimately agreed, signing a 1968 bond ordinance obligating all existing carriers to move to the new regional airport and prohibiting the operation of competing municipal airports. The effort culminated in the demolition of GSW, the 1974 opening of Dallas/Fort Worth International Airport (DFW), the closure of Love Field to certified air carriers, and a corresponding effort to redevelop Love for general aviation.

Southwest Airlines was founded after the 1968 bond ordinance; it was not a party to the agreement and felt that its business model would be affected by the long drive to the new airport. Dallas and Fort Worth sued Southwest but were unsuccessful in dislodging the airline from Love Field. After the Airline Deregulation Act in 1978, Southwest announced plans to begin interstate service in 1979. However, Texas officials—particularly those from Fort Worth—thought that increased traffic at Love Field could draw flights away from DFW Airport and threaten its financial stability. Acting on their behalf, Jim Wright, member of the U.S. House of Representatives serving Fort Worth, sponsored and helped pass an amendment to the International Air Transportation Act of 1979 in Congress that restricted passenger service out of Love Field in the following ways:

- Service using larger mainline airliners could be provided from Love Field only to airports within Texas or to four neighboring U.S. states: Arkansas, Louisiana, New Mexico and Oklahoma.
- Airlines could not offer connecting flights, through service on another airline, or through ticketing beyond the five-state region.
- Flights to other states were allowed only on aircraft with 56 seats or fewer, in an attempt to prohibit mainline passenger service outside of the five-state region.

By the mid-1990s, Southwest Airlines' business within the five-state region had burgeoned, but no carrier had seriously attempted to exploit the 56-seat exemption. Factions in Dallas had begun to view the Wright Amendment as anti-competitive and harmful to local business interests, but its restrictions were backed by Fort Worth and American Airlines to protect DFW Airport, and by local property owners who wanted to reduce jet noise and street traffic around Love Field. Attempts to modify the restrictions had become mired in lawsuits and controversy.

=== Founding and early history ===
Legend Airlines was the brainchild of T. Allan McArtor, former Federal Aviation Administration (FAA) Administrator, Federal Express executive and a U.S. Air Force pilot who had been a member of the Air Force precision flying team, the Thunderbirds. McArtor served as airline's President and chief executive officer (CEO).

In 1996, Dallas aviation company and Legend partner Dalfort Aviation announced that Legend would fly from Love Field using jets with 56 seats—the maximum number allowed for long-haul flights under Wright. Dalfort would refurbish older McDonnell Douglas DC-9s or Boeing 727s—aircraft that normally carried 90 or more passengers—with an all-first class configuration. McArtor and Dalfort CEO Bruce Leadbetter said that buying new regional jets with 56 or fewer seats was too expensive and would not provide Dalfort with much-needed overhaul business. However, the United States Department of Transportation ruled in September 1996 that the 56-seat restriction applied to the "designed capacity" of an airliner rather than to the number of seats actually installed, prompting Legend to seek a change in the law; at Legend's behest, Texas Rep. Joe Barton was soon calling for the U.S. House of Representatives to change the 56-seat requirement.

By July 1997, McArtor had enlisted the help of Senator Richard Shelby of Alabama, who proposed to change the Wright restrictions to allow Legend to use reconfigured aircraft. On 7 October 1997, despite fierce opposition from the Texas congressional delegation, the United States Senate passed a transportation funding bill including Shelby's amendment to allow nationwide flights using reconfigured 56-seat aircraft and add three U.S. states to the Wright Amendment region. On 9 October 1997, the U.S. House overwhelmingly approved the bill.

Within a month, Fort Worth was suing Legend and the city of Dallas, arguing for upholding the 1968 DFW bond agreement; Dallas and Legend argued that it could no longer be enforced. American Airlines joined Fort Worth in suing Dallas to stop the Shelby Amendment from taking effect, and McArtor accused American of quietly orchestrating the entire effort in order to block Legend. By February 1998, Southwest Airlines joined the Dallas lawsuit at the behest of Legend.

McArtor argued that Fort Worth was also violating the bond agreement by allowing Mesa Airlines and FedEx Express to operate from Meacham Field and the recently constructed Fort Worth Alliance Airport respectively. In October 1998, Legend sued Fort Worth, accusing the city of a "double standard" in its simultaneous support for Alliance and opposition to expansion at Love. However, State District Judge Bob McCoy dismissed the suit later that month on the grounds that Legend was not a party to the 1968 DFW bond agreement and thus lacked standing to sue.

=== Service begins ===
On 5 April 2000, after further legal battles against Fort Worth and American Airlines and delays in gaining operating approval from the FAA, Legend began the first long-haul service from Love Field since 1974 with a flight to Washington Dulles International Airport (IAD). Legend Airlines soon operated nonstop service to IAD, Las Vegas McCarran International Airport (LAS) and Los Angeles International Airport (LAX). LaGuardia Airport (LGA) in New York City was then added as a fourth destination.

Despite continuing to argue in court that long-haul service from Love Field should be blocked, American Airlines, in a competitive move, reconfigured several of its Fokker 100 jets with 56 seats in a similar business class-like configuration and operated nonstop service from Love Field starting on 1 May 2000 to Chicago O'Hare Airport (ORD), LAX, and LGA.

On 29 June 2000, the United States Supreme Court declined to review a federal appeals court decision allowing long-haul flights from Love, effectively ending the last attempt by Fort Worth, the D/FW Airport Board, and American Airlines to stop Legend in the courts.

=== Demise ===
Legend spent more than most new airlines prior to starting flights; figures range from $21 million to $29 million. Its aircraft had languished on the ground for three years. Although its flights to New York and Washington averaged almost two-thirds capacity, the airline lost $25 million during its first six months of operation, being afflicted by high start-up costs, high fuel costs, and intense competition from other airlines.

Legend suspended flights indefinitely on 3 December 2000 after failing to secure additional financing, and announced that it would be filing for Chapter 11 bankruptcy protection. In early 2001, Legend laid off all of its Dallas employees, surrendered its air operator's certificate, and announced that it would enter Chapter 7 liquidation. In May, McArtor left Legend to head the North American unit of Airbus, and the airline's physical assets were auctioned in June 2001, including an estimated $1 million in DC-9 spares, but not the aircraft themselves, which were leased. By late 2002, two of the airline's former DC-9s were being operated by Southeast Airlines, one had been purchased by the Columbus Blue Jackets hockey team, and the other four had been mothballed in Kingman, Arizona, awaiting new buyers.

In 2016, journalist Robert Wilonsky described the airline's downfall as the result of a conspiracy by American Airlines, Southwest Airlines, the D/FW Airport Board, and the cities of Dallas and Fort Worth to "break Legend before it ever got off the ground."

Despite its failure to establish a viable aviation business, industry observers credited Legend Airlines with engineering the first substantive change to the controversial Wright Amendment and with introducing competition to Southwest Airlines at Love Field; when Legend ceased operation, American, Continental Express, and Delta Connection affiliate Atlantic Southeast Airlines had all begun operating from the airport to compete with the startup carrier. Legend's activities prompted other aviation interests to seriously consider using regional jets on long-haul flights from Love Field and to more openly back changes to the Wright Amendment, ideas that seemed infeasible beforehand. The Wright Amendment region was subsequently expanded again in 2005, and the law was partially repealed in 2006 and fully repealed in 2014.

== In-flight services ==
Aiming for the lucrative full-fare business travel market, Legend Airlines provided a high level of service, with all seats in a business class configuration. Two wide seats were installed on each side of the generous center aisle (known as a 2-2 arrangement), and legroom was ample due to the removal of several entire rows of seats from its DC-9 airliners, which usually carried 100 or more passengers in a 2-3 arrangement. Fresh flowers adorned aircraft interiors and the executive terminal at Love Field; the latter was set up so passengers could exit their aircraft and board a taxi in less than a minute. Legend was the first airline to offer live in-flight television on seat-back monitors; the DirecTV service was soon offered by JetBlue as well, but Legend offered it for free rather than charging travelers $5 to use it. Seats were also equipped with an AT&T Airfones and laptop computer charging ports. The lavish meals, described as "celebrity-chef crafted", were commissioned from several Dallas-area chefs and were served on real china with silverware, fresh fruit, and individual pats of real butter, rather than the plastic trays, plastic utensils, and packaged condiments and fruit generally offered by other carriers. Meals came with a ribbon-tied box of chocolate truffles and wines selected to complement the food. All of these amenities were offered for fares comparable to rival airlines' coach-class tickets.

== Executive terminal ==
Legend operated a separate executive passenger terminal at the perimeter of Love Field, at 7777 Lemmon Avenue near Lovers Lane, rather than using the primary central passenger terminal. The Legend terminal's compact size and efficient layout allowed passengers to board flights only a few minutes after arriving at curbside. The terminal cost $20 million to construct and reflected the airline's upscale image, with leather seats, fresh flowers, and gates designed to resemble private executive clubs.

The complex was built by and leased from a private investment group loosely affiliated with Legend and Dalfort but not directly controlled by either company. Upon Legend's collapse, the owners immediately sought new tenants, subleasing one gate to Atlantic Southeast Airlines and entering into talks with American and Continental Express, who were then sharing the only two gates in the main terminal that were not controlled by Southwest Airlines. Despite the owner's efforts, the gates were vacant by the summer of 2002, although some office and parking garage space had been leased to non-aviation businesses.

In late 2005, the owners were publicly backing an effort to repeal the Wright Amendment, hoping to boost the lease value of the still-vacant gates; however, Dallas mayor Laura Miller was openly campaigning for the structure to be torn down. In June 2006, the cities of Dallas and Fort Worth, DFW Airport, Southwest Airlines, and American Airlines executed a complex agreement as a condition of their mutual support for the repeal of the Wright Amendment. Among other provisions, the agreement imposed a permanent 20-gate cap at Love Field and obligated Dallas to revise its airport master plan and demolish all gates in excess of that number "as soon as practical". After the partial repeal of the Wright Amendment became effective in October 2006, the Dallas City Council immediately approved using eminent domain to seize and raze the Legend gates to comply with the cap. This effectively ended negotiations to sell the facility to Pinnacle Airlines, and the gates were subsequently condemned by the federal government and torn down, with the owners receiving nothing in return.

The owners filed a lawsuit challenging the Wright Amendment repeal on antitrust grounds but the suit was thrown out by the federal courts in late 2007. However, the owners filed another suit in 2008 accusing the federal government of having condemned the structure without just compensation, and in April 2016, Federal Claims Judge Margaret M. Sweeney sided with owners Love Terminal Partners and Virginia Aerospace, ordering the government to pay them $133 million plus interest for having destroyed the property's economic value.

== Fleet ==
- 7 McDonnell Douglas DC-9-32 - all obtained secondhand from other airlines and configured with 56 seats

== Destinations ==
Legend Airlines served the following destinations during its existence:

- Dallas, Texas: Love Field (DAL) - airline headquarters and hub
- Las Vegas, Nevada: McCarran International Airport (LAS)
- Los Angeles, California: Los Angeles International Airport (LAX)
- New York City, New York: LaGuardia Airport (LGA)
- Washington, D.C.: Washington Dulles International Airport (IAD)

== See also ==
- List of defunct airlines of the United States
