= Dallas Love Field =

Municipal airport in Dallas, Texas, United States

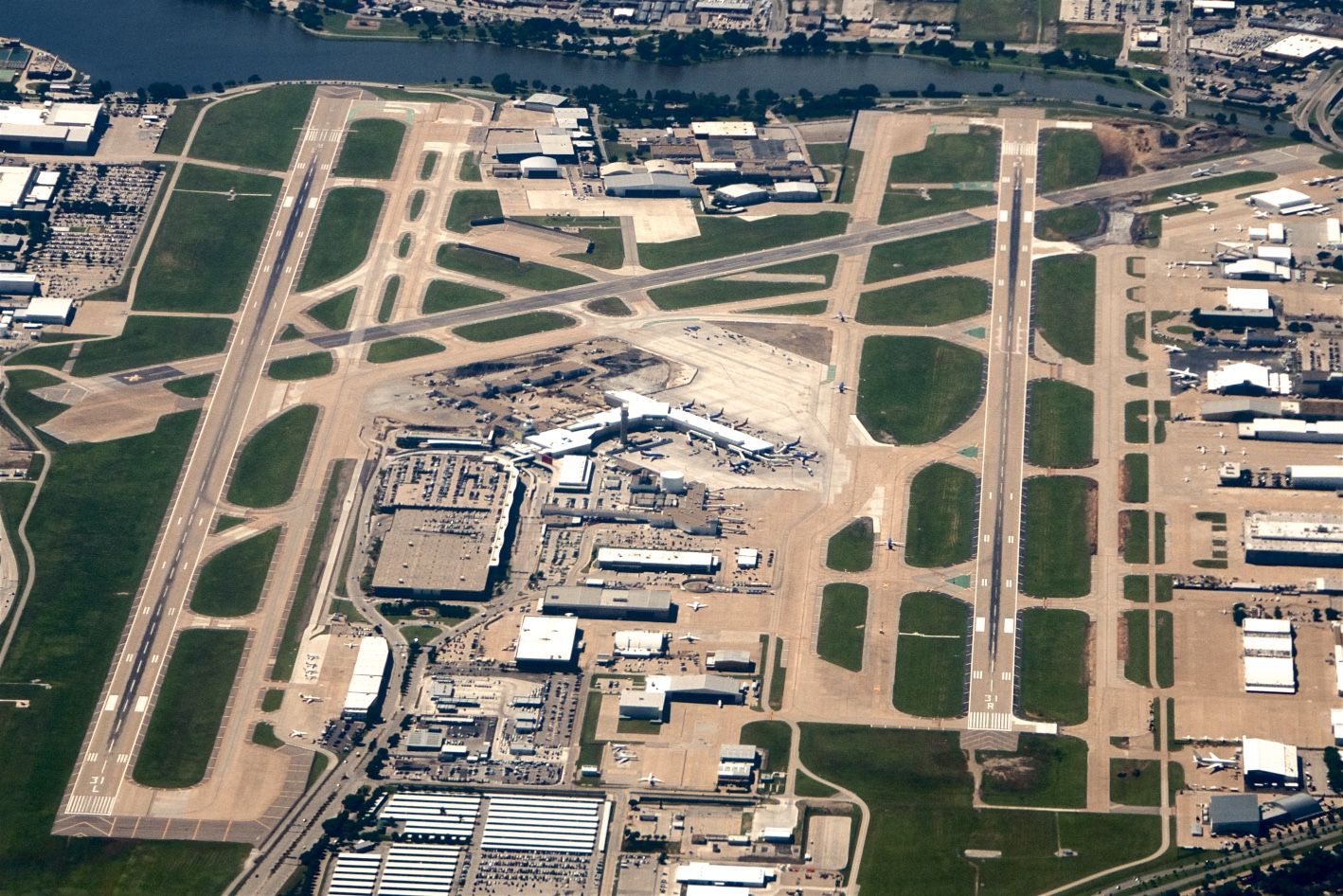
- 2013 aerial photo, before diagonal runway 18/36 (top right to middle left) was removed
- IATA: DAL; ICAO: KDAL; FAA LID: DAL; WMO: 72258

Summary
- Airport type: Public
- Owner: City of Dallas
- Operator: Dallas Department of Aviation
- Serves: Dallas–Fort Worth metroplex
- Location: Love Field, Dallas, Texas, United States
- Opened: October 19, 1917; 109 years ago
- Operating base for: JSX; Southwest Airlines
- Elevation AMSL: 487 ft (148 m)
- Coordinates: 32°50′50″N 096°51′06″W
- Website: www.dallas-lovefield.com

Maps
- Interactive map of Dallas Love Field

Runways
Direction	Length		Surface
Direction	ft	m	Surface
13L/31R	7,752	2,363	Concrete
13R/31L	8,800	2,682	Concrete

Statistics (2025)
- Total passengers: 16,899,203 ▼5.5%
- Enplanements: 8,434,765
- Deplanements: 8,464,438
- Source: Federal Aviation Administration

Dallas Love Field (IATA: DAL, ICAO: KDAL, FAA LID: DAL) is a city-owned public airport in the neighborhood of Love Field, about 6 miles (10 km; 5 nmi) northwest of downtown Dallas, Texas, United States. It was Dallas' main airport until 1974 when Dallas Fort Worth International Airport (DFW) opened and now serves as a secondary. Love Field covers an area of 1,300 acres (530 ha) at an elevation of 487 feet (148 m) above mean sea level and has two runways.

Love Field is the birthplace, corporate headquarters, and a major operating base of Southwest Airlines; as of August 2021, Southwest has a 95% market share at the airport. Several full-service fixed-base operators (FBOs) provide general aviation services: fuel, maintenance, hangar rentals, and air charters. The City of Dallas Department of Aviation headquarters is on the airport grounds.

== History ==
Dallas Love Field is named after Moss L. Love, who, while assigned to the U.S. Army 11th Cavalry, died in an airplane crash near San Diego, California, on September 4, 1913, becoming the tenth fatality in U.S. Army aviation history. His Wright Model C biplane crashed during practice for his Military Aviator Test. Love Field was named by the United States Army on October 19, 1917.

=== World War I ===
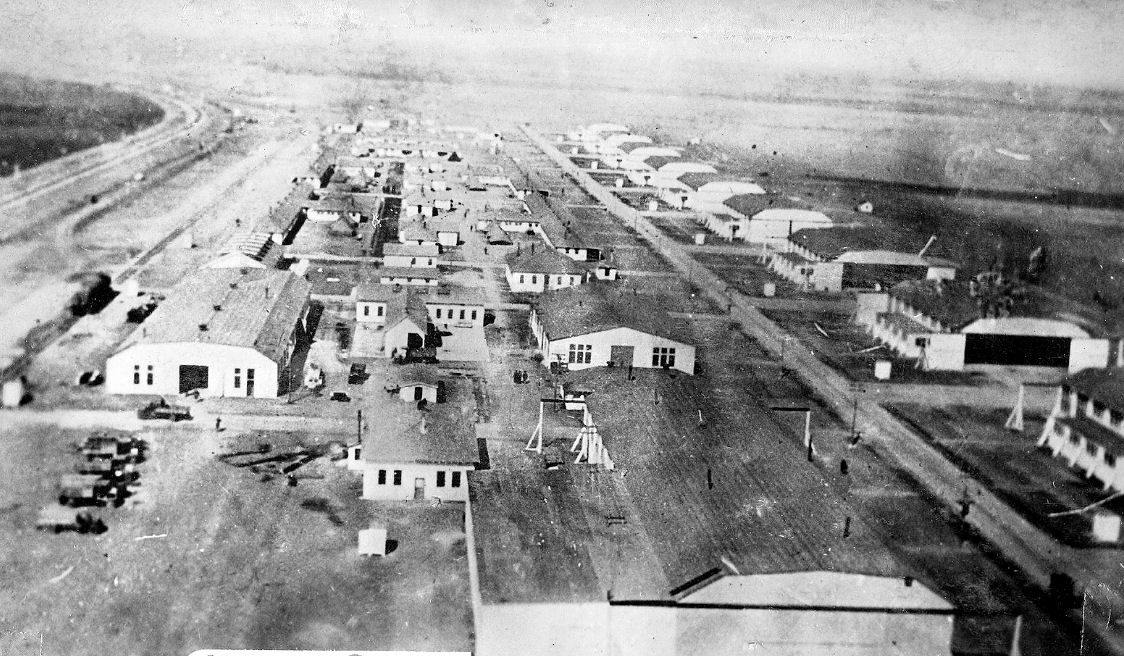
Love Field in 1918 during World War I

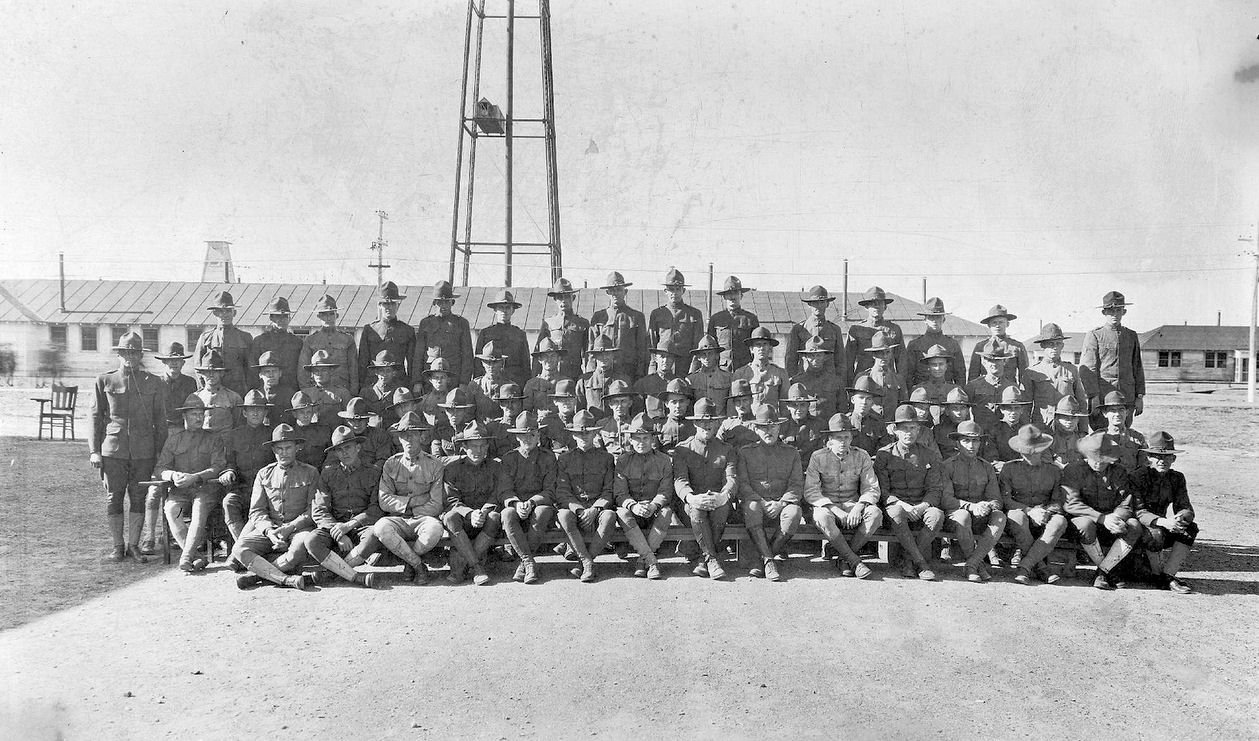
136th Aero Squadron (Later Squadron "C") Love Field Texas, 1918

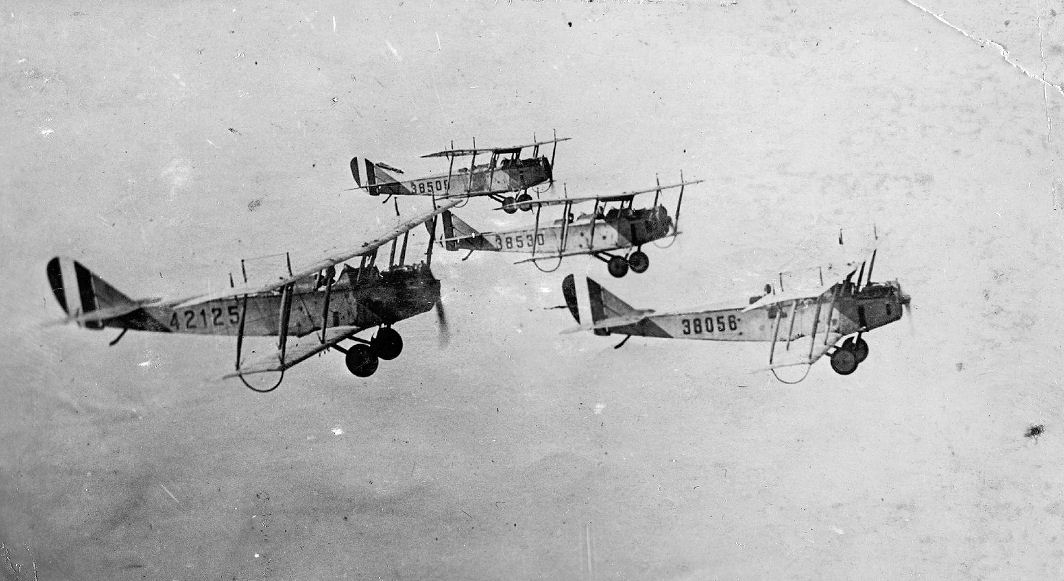
Training flight of 4 Curtiss JN-4Ds from Love Field

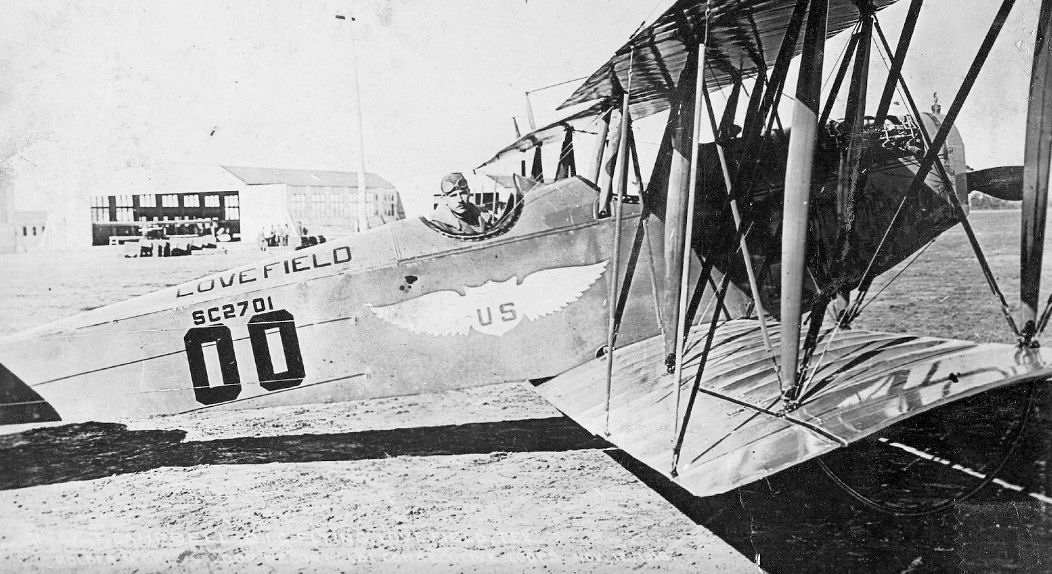
Instructor pilot sitting in a Curtiss JN-4

Dallas Love Field originated in 1917 when the Army announced it would establish a series of camps to train prospective pilots after the United States entered into World War I. The airfield was one of 32 new Air Service fields. It was constructed just southeast of Bachman Lake, and it covered over 700 acres and could accommodate up to 1,000 personnel. Dozens of wooden buildings served as headquarters, maintenance, and officers' quarters. Enlisted men had to bivouac in tents.

Love Field served as a base for flight training for the United States Army Air Service. In 1917, flight training occurred in two phases: primary and advanced. Primary training took eight weeks and consisted of pilots learning basic flight skills under dual and solo instruction. After completing their primary training at Love Field, flight cadets were transferred to another base for advanced training.

After officially opening on October 19, 1917, the first unit stationed at Love Field was the 136th Aero Squadron, transferred from Kelly Field, south of San Antonio, Texas. Only a few U.S. Army Air Service aircraft arrived with the 136th Aero Squadron, and most of the Curtiss JN-4 Jenny aircraft to be used for flight training were shipped in wooden crates by railcar. Training units assigned to Love Field during World War I were:

- Post Headquarters, Love Field, October 1917 – December 1919
- 71st Aero Squadron (II), February 1918

Re-designated as Squadron "A", July–November 1918

- 121st Aero Squadron (II), April 1918

Re-designated as Squadron "B", July–November 1918

- 136th Aero Squadron (II), November 1917

Re-designated as Squadron "C", July–November 1918

- 197th Aero Squadron, November 1917

Re-designated as Squadron "D", July–November 1918

- Flying School Detachment (Consolidation of Squadrons A-D), November 1918 – November 1919

The 865th Aero Squadron (Repair) was formed at Love Field in March 1918 as a JN-4 aircraft repair and maintenance support unit. It was assigned to the Aviation Repair Depot, Dallas, Texas (at Love Field), in April 1918 and demobilized in March 1919.

With the sudden end of World War I in November 1918, the future operational status of Love Field was unknown. Many local officials speculated the U.S. government would keep the field open because of the outstanding combat record established by Love-trained pilots in Europe. Locals also pointed to the optimal weather conditions in the Dallas area for flight training. On November 11, 1918, cadets in flight training were allowed to complete their training; however, no new cadets were assigned to the base. The separate training squadrons were consolidated into a single Flying School detachment, as many of the personnel assigned were being demobilized.

=== Inter-war years ===
In December 1919, Love Field was deactivated as an active duty airfield and converted into a storage facility for surplus De Havilland and JN-4 aircraft, some of the latter having been repurchased by the Curtiss Aeroplane and Motor Company in the spring of 1919. In what was called "the largest recruiting mission in the spring and summer of 1919", Lt. Col. Henry B. Clagett began with seven DH-4s departing Dallas and flying as far as Boston. A small caretaker unit was assigned to the facility for administrative reasons, and it was used intermittently to support small military units.

In January 1921, 1st Lt William D. Coney attempted to fly from San Diego to Jacksonville with just one stop—at Love Field. In 1921, the aviation repair depot next to Love Field moved to Kelly Field in San Antonio to consolidate with the supply depot at Kelly and form the San Antonio Intermediate Air Depot. In 1923, Dallas was a route point between Muskogee and Kelly Field on the southern division of the model airway. However, by 1923, the decision had been made to phase down all activities at the new base in accordance with sharply reduced military budgets, and it was closed. The War Department had ordered the small caretaker force at Love Field to dismantle all remaining structures and to sell them as surplus. The War Department leased out the vacant land to local farmers and ranchers.

In 1928, Dallas purchased Love Field, which opened for civilian use (the first passenger service was by the National Air Transport company). On April 9, 1932, the first paved runways at the airfield were completed. In March 1939, the airfield had 21 weekday airline departures: 9 American, 8 Braniff and 4 Delta. On October 6, 1940, Love Field's Lemmon Avenue Terminal Building opened on the east side of the airfield.

=== World War II ===
"On 6 June 1939, the War Department approved...nine civil school detachments", including one at Dallas (cf. a 1940 school approved for Ft Worth's Hicks Field, a new 1942 Ft Worth Airfield–Tarrant Field at the government plant and that had a four-engine pilots' school,) and a Ferrying Command control center at Dallas's Hensley Field.

By October 1940 at the Texas Army Airfields, classes had entered the Dallas Texas Aviation School, which provided basic (level 1) flight training using Fairchild PT-19s as the primary trainer. The Gulf Coast ACTC school later moved to Brady, Texas; and Love Field also had an Air Materiel Command modification center. In September 1942, the Air Transport Command activity at Hensley Field moved to Love Field. ATC's 5th Ferrying Group, consisting of Women's Auxiliary Ferrying Squadrons (WAFS) ferried PT-17s, AT-6s and twin-engine Cessna AT-17s; and Love Field was also used by the San Antonio Air Service Command for aircraft overhauls. The 2d Ferrying Squadron of the 5th Ferrying Group was moved by Air Transport Command from Love Field to Fairfax Field at Kansas City on April 15, 1943.

In September 1943, a new north–south runway 18/36 and northwest–southeast runway 13/31 were completed. Air Force facilities closed at the end of World War II except for Love Field's automatic tracking radar station (call sign Dallas Bomb Plot) for Radar Bomb Scoring that had been established by June 6, 1945 (transferred to Strategic Air Command on March 21, 1946, 10th RBSS Det 1 by 1957).

=== Post-war ===
Postwar aerial view with Lemmon Ave. terminal and Runway 7/25 prior to closure, March 11, 1949

On November 29, 1949, American Airlines Flight 157, a Douglas DC-6 en route from New York City to Dallas and Mexico City with 46 passengers and crew, slid off Runway 36 after the flight crew lost control on final approach. The airliner struck buildings (Note: The crash occurred in the neighborhood northwest of Love Field and southeast of Bachman Lake; many of the buildings and streets in this area were later removed to accommodate Runway 13R/31L.) and caught fire, killing 28. It was the deadliest air disaster in Texas history at the time and, according to modern reference sources, remains the deadliest crash at the airfield.

Pioneer Air Lines moved its base from Houston to Love Field in 1950.

In 1953, Fort Worth opened Amon Carter Field, which would later become Greater Southwest International Airport, to compete with Love Field. Fort Worth had attempted to negotiate with Dallas to collaborate on the new airport, but Dallas repeatedly declined those attempts. Upon completion, all of the passenger airlines were transferred from Fort Worth's previous airline airport, Meacham Field, to Greater Southwest, leaving Love Field and Greater Southwest as the only air transportation options for the Dallas–Fort Worth area.

The February 1953 C&GS diagram shows Runway 7 (4,301 ft (1,311 m)), Runway 13 (6,201 ft (1,890 m)) and Runway 18 (5,202 ft (1,586 m)). On June 1, 1954, Runway 7/25 was closed; it was later removed to allow terminal expansion. Love Field then had two runways: Runway 13/31, the main runway, and the shorter 18/36.

The April 1957 Official Airline Guide shows 52 weekday departures on Braniff, 45 on American, 25 Delta, 21 Trans-Texas, 12 Central and 9 Continental. Three nonstops a day to Washington DC, three to New York/Newark, six to Chicago, five to California and 12 a week to Mexico City.

=== Jet age ===
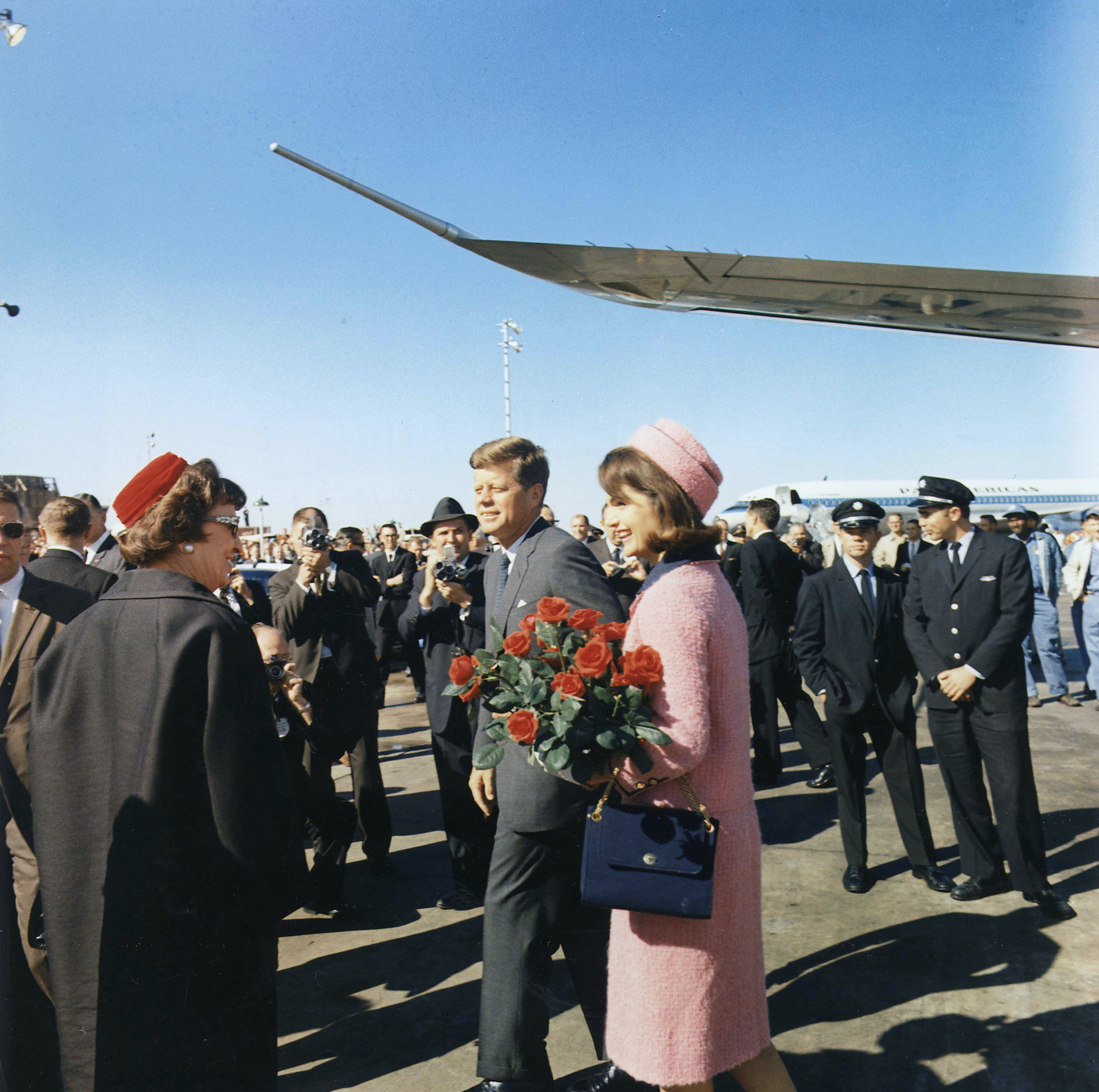
United States President John F. Kennedy and Jacqueline Kennedy arrive at Love Field hours before JFK's assassination, November 22, 1963

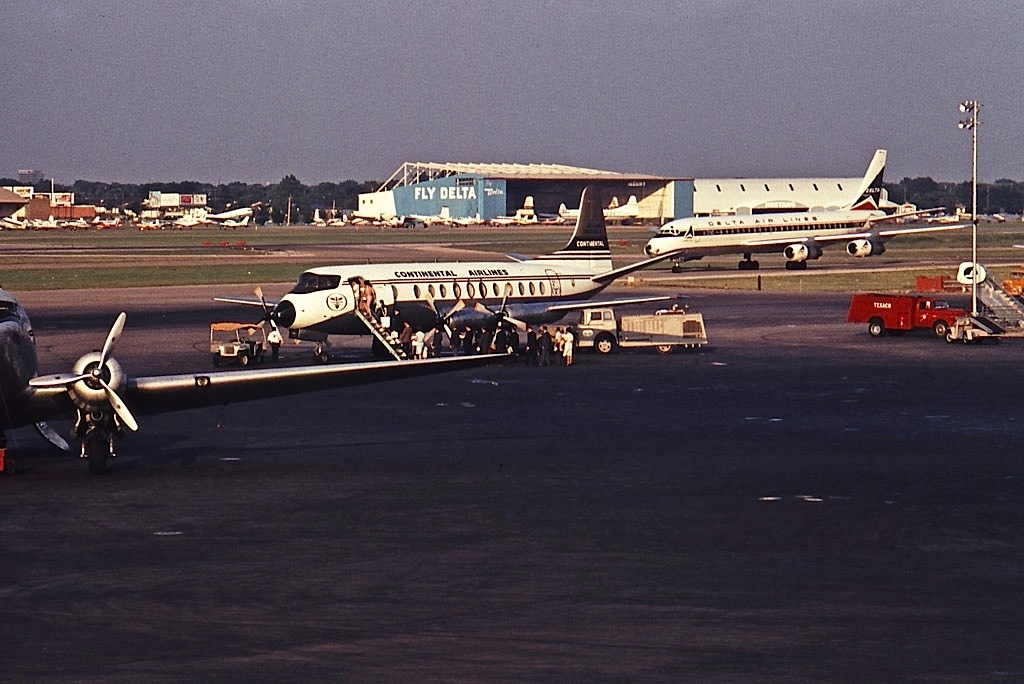
A Continental Vickers Viscount turboprop and a Delta Douglas DC-8 jet at Love Field in 1966, shortly before terminal modernization began. An Eastern Airlines staircase is also visible

Love Field's new terminal (the third terminal, designed by Donald S. Nelson) opened to the airlines on January 20, 1958, with three one-story concourses, 26 ramp-level gates and the world's first airport moving walkways. Air carriers serving the airport at the time included American Airlines, Braniff International Airways (which was based in Dallas), Central Airlines (which was based in nearby Fort Worth), Continental Airlines, Delta Air Lines and Trans-Texas Airways (which later changed its name to Texas International Airlines).

Turbine-power flights began on April 1, 1959, when Continental Airlines introduced the Vickers Viscount turboprop. Jet airline flights began on July 12, 1959, when American Airlines started Boeing 707 flights to New York. By 1963, Love Field had direct, no change of plane Boeing 707 jet service to London and Frankfurt jointly operated daily by Braniff International and Pan American World Airways (Pan Am). The trips were conducted via an interchange agreement between the two airlines, with these flights making an intermediate stop at Chicago O'Hare Airport.

In 1961, Mr. and Mrs. Earle Wyatt gave a large bronze statue titled One Riot, One Ranger for display in the airport's new terminal. Famed Texas-born sculptor Waldine Tauch created the piece. The inscription refers to an incident in which a single Texas Ranger was supposedly dispatched to quell a riot. The statue was removed from the airport in June 2020 after it was revealed that the ranger who modeled for the statue had been dispatched to the Dallas area in 1956 to help white supremacist protesters defy lawful efforts to end racial segregation of local public schools.

On November 22, 1963, United States President John F. Kennedy arrived at Love Field on Air Force One and was assassinated in Dealey Plaza less than one hour later while his motorcade was traveling from Love Field to the Dallas Trade Mart and died at Parkland Memorial Hospital. Texas Governor John Connally was riding in the presidential limousine and was seriously wounded. Ninety minutes later, Vice President Lyndon B. Johnson was sworn in as president aboard Air Force One before it departed from Love Field to Washington, D.C.

On April 2, 1965, the 8,800 ft (2,700 m) parallel Runway 13R/31L opened (Runway 13/31 became Runway 13L/31R). The project had been vexed by legal wrangling; safety concerns were raised regarding its proximity to schools and its minimal safety areas, while nearby residents attempted to stop the anticipated increase in jet noise and the removal of homes and businesses adjacent to the airport to accommodate the project.

Several terminal expansion programs were fueled by the boom in air travel during the 1960s. American Airlines expanded its concourse in 1968, and Braniff opened its "Terminal of the Future." The expansion, showcasing Alexander Girard, Herman Miller and Ray and Charles Eames designs, featured the first rotunda concourse, jet bridges, and several airport innovations. Braniff connected their new terminal to new remote parking lots with the Jetrail monorail system in 1970. Texas International expanded their concourse in 1969, and Delta's concourse was expanded in 1970. By 1972, American used 14 gates on the west end of the terminal, Delta used 13 gates, Braniff International and Ozark together used 13 gates on the east end of the terminal, and Texas International used seven gates. According to the Official Airline Guide (OAG), both Braniff International and Delta were operating Boeing 747-100 jumbo jet service from Love Field during the early 1970s with Braniff flying the 747 nonstop to Honolulu and Delta flying 747 nonstops to both Atlanta and Los Angeles.

In 1964, the Civil Aeronautics Board (CAB), tired of funding competing commercial airports in Dallas and Fort Worth, gave the two cities a six-month period to plan a new regional airport. In 1968, they finalized an agreement to build Dallas/Fort Worth Regional Airport (now Dallas Fort Worth International Airport or DFW) and to restrict air-carrier operations at their respective municipal airports to promote the new facility. All carriers then operating at Love Field—American, Braniff, Continental, Delta, Eastern, Frontier, Ozark, and Texas International—simultaneously agreed to shift all commercial flights to DFW Airport when it opened in early 1974.

In 1971, Southwest Airlines—arguing that the CAB had no jurisdiction over purely intrastate flights—received an air operator's certificate from the State of Texas to operate from any airport in the Dallas–Fort Worth metroplex, and began quick, no-frills flights between Love Field, Houston, and San Antonio. Southwest had not signed the 1968 regional airport agreement, and the airline's founders felt that Dallas residents would find the long drive to DFW Airport inconvenient and contrary to the notion of a quick trip. The cities of Dallas and Fort Worth and the Dallas–Fort Worth Regional Airport Board sued, arguing that the 1968 agreement gave them the authority to force Southwest to fly from DFW; however, the courts ruled in Southwest's favor, stating that the cities could not block the airline from using Love Field so long as it remained open as an airport.

In 1972, Love Field saw an aircraft hijacking. On January 12, 1972, Billy Gene Hurst Jr., a resident of Houston, hijacked Braniff Flight 38, a Boeing 727, as it departed William P. Hobby Airport in Houston bound for Dallas. After the plane landed at Love Field, Hurst allowed all 94 passengers to deplane but continued to hold the seven crewmembers hostage. Hurst insisted on flying to South America and made a variety of other demands, including food, cigarettes, parachutes, jungle survival gear, US$2,000,000 (equivalent to $15,393,795 in 2025), and a handgun. After a 6-hour standoff, police gave Hurst a package containing parachutes and some other items, and the hostages escaped while he was distracted examining the package's contents. Police stormed the craft soon afterward and arrested him without serious incident. He was later sentenced to 20 years in prison.

In 1973, Love Field, which had more than 70 gates and saw frequent Boeing 747 service, reached record enplanements at 6,668,398 and ranked as the eighth busiest airport in the United States. On January 13, 1974, DFW Airport opened, ending most passenger service at Love Field. Greater Southwest International Airport, which was located just south of DFW Airport and lay in its flight path, was permanently closed and subsequently demolished.

In early 1974, to capitalize on a perception among Dallas residents that Love Field was more convenient than DFW Airport, Metroflight Airlines inaugurated flights between Love and DFW using de Havilland Twin Otters. Airfare was only $10 ($65.28 in 2025), which was advertised as less than a typical one-way taxi fare between Dallas and DFW Airport. However, the service proved unprofitable, and it was discontinued in September 1975.

With the drastic reduction in flights and only 467,212 enplanements in 1975, Love Field decommissioned several of its concourses.

The city of Dallas attempted to use these dormant facilities by leasing some to Wesley Goyer, who opened the Llove Entertainment Complex in November 1975. The main lobby at the front of a former terminal was transformed into movie theaters, an ice rink, a roller rink, huge video arcades, restaurants, and a bowling alley. During its first two weeks, the Llove center saw 800 people on weekdays and more than 4,000 during the weekend, exceeding Goyer's expectations. Llove seemed especially suited for the pre-teen and teen crowd, who could spend the day for a single admission charge of about $2.95 ($17.65 in 2025). After exceeding expectations initially, by the end of the first full year of operation, Llove's attendance rates had drastically dropped, leading to the complex being closed in May 1978.

=== Wright Amendment ===
After deregulation of the U.S. airline industry in 1978, Southwest Airlines announced plans to start interstate service in 1979, a proposal quickly endorsed by federal regulators. This upset local officials, who feared increased commercial traffic at Love Field could threaten DFW Airport's financial stability. To protect DFW Airport from significant competition at Love Field, Fort Worth-based U.S. Representative (later Speaker of the House) Jim Wright pushed a law through Congress, the Wright Amendment, which restricted air service at Love Field in the following ways: Passenger service on regular mid-sized and large aircraft could only be provided from Love Field to locations within Texas and four neighboring states (Louisiana, Arkansas, Oklahoma, and New Mexico). Airlines could not offer connecting flights, through service on another airline, or through ticketing beyond the five-state region. Long-haul service to other states was only allowed using aircraft with 56 or fewer passenger seats.

The amendment dissuaded major airlines from starting service out of Love Field, which freed Southwest from direct competition, and the airline continued to build its Love Field operation by offering convenient short-haul flights. This success eventually prompted other airlines to consider using the airport for short-haul trips. Southwest co-founder Lamar Muse started Muse Air, a short-haul competitor operating McDonnell Douglas DC-9 and McDonnell Douglas MD-80 jets between Love Field and Houston in 1982. Muse Air was unable to operate profitably at Love Field and was purchased by Southwest in 1985, renamed TranStar Airlines, and ultimately shut down in 1987. Continental Airlines proposed to fly out of Love Field in 1985, which led to years of court battles over the interpretation of the Wright Amendment, as Fort Worth and DFW Airport sought to prevent expansion at Love Field. Although Continental's proposal was ultimately stillborn, it led to a United States Department of Transportation (USDOT) ruling that the Wright Amendment only prohibited through-ticketing specific flight segments to or from Love Field, and that selling a passenger a separate ticket on a connecting flight at another airport—a practice known as double ticketing—was legal if the second ticket was not offered until the traveler asked for it. This further benefited Southwest by allowing a sophisticated passenger to work the system and bypass the Wright ticketing restrictions by flying from Love Field to another airport in the five-state region, changing planes, and then flying on a separate ticket to any city Southwest served.

In the early 1990s, a faction led by Dallas city councilman Jerry Bartos lobbied for the repeal of the Wright Amendment, but the effort soon became mired in lawsuits and was halted by Dallas mayor Steve Bartlett following negotiations with Fort Worth. However, in 1996, Love-based upstart Legend Airlines said it would operate long-haul flights under the 56-passenger exemption, using McDonnell Douglas DC-9-30 jets modified in a 56-seat all-business class configuration. (Note: A DC-9-30 has a typical passenger capacity of 115 in an all-economy configuration.) However, the USDOT ruled in September 1996 that the 56-seat restriction applied to the "designed capacity" of an airliner rather than to the number of seats actually installed, prompting Legend to seek a change in the law; Texas Rep. Joe Barton was soon calling for the U.S. House to change the 56-seat rule.

By July 1997, Legend CEO and former FAA administrator T. Allan McArtor had enlisted the help of Senator Richard Shelby of Alabama, who proposed an amendment to allow Legend to use the refurbished planes. In 1997, the Shelby Amendment was passed by Congress; a compromise of sorts, the new law allowed Love Field flights to three more states: Kansas, Mississippi, and Alabama, and amended the definition of 56-passenger jets that could fly to other states to include any aircraft weighing less than 300,000 lb (140,000 kg) with 56 or fewer seats.

The Shelby Amendment prompted other airlines to consider flying 56-passenger jets out of Love Field, including Continental and Delta. Fort Worth immediately sued Dallas to prevent the Shelby Amendment from going into effect. American Airlines, headquartered at DFW, joined the lawsuits against Dallas, but also said if other airlines were allowed to fly out of Love Field, it would have no choice but to offer competing service. In 1998, after a year of legal decisions and appeals, Continental Express became only the fourth airline to fly out of Love Field since 1974 with service to George Bush Intercontinental Airport in Houston; however, federal courts blocked the airline's proposed interstate service. Despite the Shelby Amendment, Southwest did not add flights to the new states, citing a lack of demand.

On February 10, 2000, a federal judge lifted the injunction against Continental Express' proposed interstate service to Cleveland, and the airline announced that flights would begin on June 1. After further legal battles and delays in gaining final approval from the FAA, Legend began the first long-haul service from Love Field since 1974 with a flight to Dulles International Airport (IAD) on April 5, 2000, using a refurbished 56-seat DC-9-30. Legend soon operated scheduled passenger service nonstop from Love Field to Los Angeles (LAX), New York LaGuardia Airport (LGA), Las Vegas (LAS), and Dulles. Although continuing their legal efforts, American Airlines launched a direct challenge to Legend with its first flights from Love Field since 1974, starting service on May 1 with Fokker 100 jets reconfigured with 56 seats with nonstop flights to Chicago (ORD) and Los Angeles (LAX).

In 2000, several federal appeals court decisions struck down all lawsuits against the Shelby Amendment. Fort Worth and American Airlines appealed to the U.S. Supreme Court, which refused to review the case. These decisions opened the door to increased long-haul flights out of Love Field using 56-passenger jets, including new service by Delta, whose regional affiliate Atlantic Southeast Airlines began flights to Delta's Atlanta hub in July. The majority of this 56-passenger jet market was composed of business travelers making day trips to other cities. However, Legend was unable to operate profitably; it suspended flight operations indefinitely in early December and dissolved a few months later.

In November 2004, Southwest announced their active opposition to the Wright Amendment, claiming that the law was anti-competitive and outdated – it placed banners throughout the airport grounds declaring, Wright is wrong. In November 2005, Senator Kit Bond of Missouri attached an amendment to a transportation spending bill to exempt his state from the Wright restrictions. Soon after the bill's passage, Southwest began nonstop flights from Love Field to St. Louis and Kansas City on December 13, 2005. The same day, American Airlines announced that it would start service from Love Field to the same Missouri airports on March 2, 2006, along with flights to the Southwest strongholds of San Antonio and Austin.

On June 15, 2006, a compromise was reached between American, Southwest, DFW Airport and the cities of Dallas and Fort Worth to repeal the Wright Amendment with several conditions. Among them: the ban on nonstop flights outside the Wright zone would remain until 2014; through-ticketing to domestic airports (connecting flights to long-haul destinations) would be allowed immediately; Love Field's gate count would be permanently reduced from 32 to 20; and Love Field would handle only domestic flights non-stop. Southwest would be able to operate from 16 gates, American 2 gates, and Continental 2 gates. U.S. Senator Kay Bailey Hutchison led the effort to pass the bill in the Senate while Rep. Kay Granger led a bipartisan Texas House coalition to see the bill through to a successful conclusion in the House. President George W. Bush signed the bill into law on October 13, 2006. Along with the 20-gate cap, the repeal prohibits international commercial flights from the airport, and if Southwest begins flights from any other North Texas airport before 2025, it must give up one Love Field gate.

On October 17, 2006, Southwest Airlines announced it would begin one-stop or connecting service between Love Field and 25 destinations outside the Wright zone on October 19, 2006. American Airlines made travel between Love Field and locations outside the Wright zone available by October 18, 2006.

In early 2009, a plan to modernize Love Field was announced. The $519 million master plan would replace the terminals with a new 20-gate concourse and expanded baggage facilities. The project also called for a $250M people mover system to connect to Dallas Area Rapid Transit's Burbank Station, but this was eliminated in favor of a cheaper bus connection to Inwood Station.

=== Recent history ===
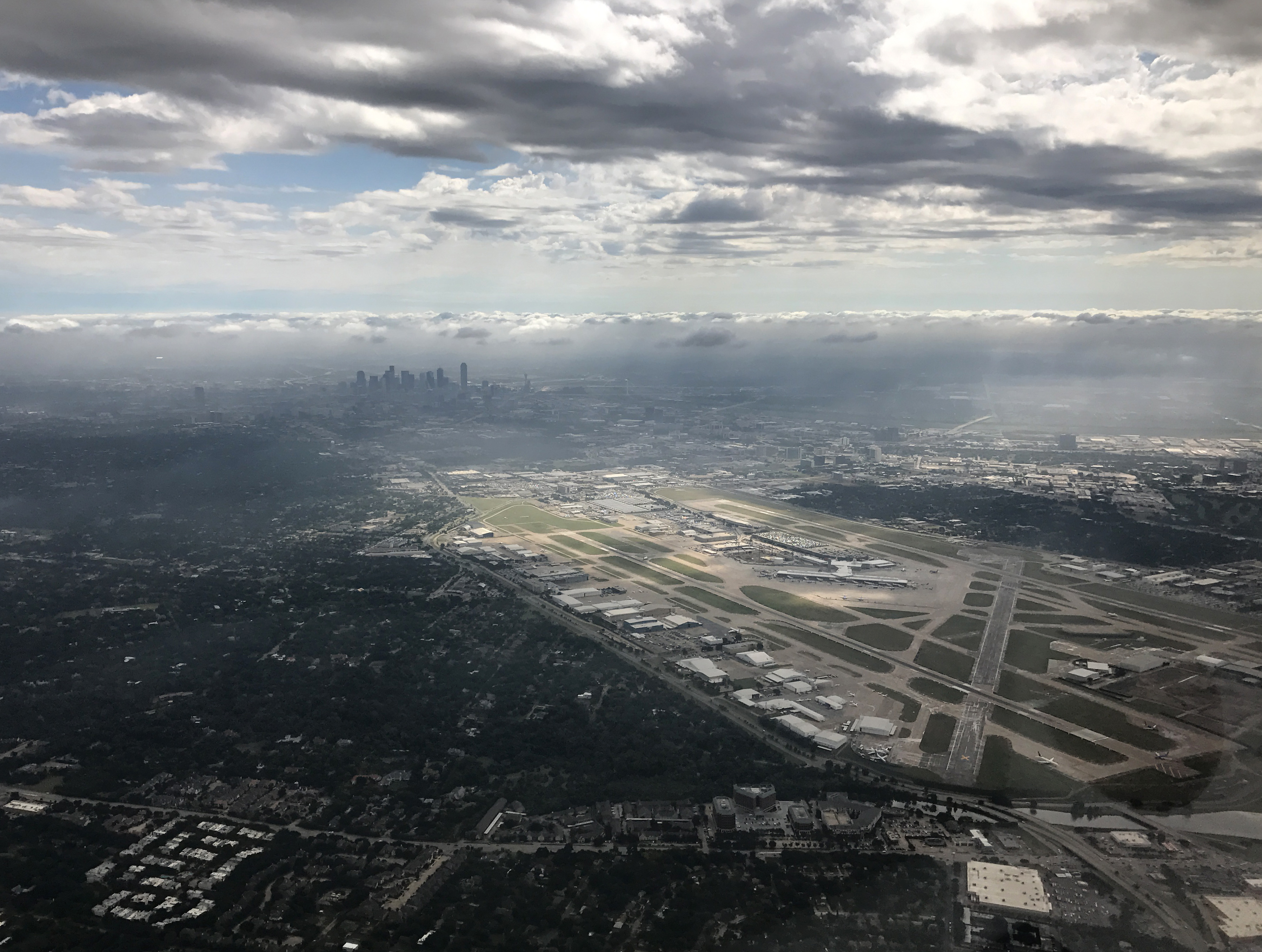
Aerial photo of Dallas Love Field, looking South with downtown Dallas in the distance.

Southwest Airlines added Baltimore, Denver, Las Vegas, Orlando, Washington–Reagan and Chicago–Midway on October 13, 2014, the day the repeal went into effect. The first flight to operate outside of the Wright Amendment restricted area was Southwest Airlines flight 1013 to Denver (the flight number of which was named after the date). On November 2, 2014, Southwest added new service to Atlanta, Nashville, Fort Lauderdale, Los Angeles, New York–LaGuardia, Phoenix, San Diego, Orange County (California) and Tampa.

In the early 2010s, the airport saw two significant perimeter security breaches by vehicles. In 2010, a man crashed a pickup truck through a chain-link perimeter fence while being pursued by Dallas police vehicles outside the airport, leading police on a chase around airport grounds until a police vehicle crashed into his truck; the driver was arrested and imprisoned. In the second incident in 2013, a man drove an SUV along a taxiway at high speed after an aviation company employee opened a gate to ask him what he wanted; the man was found sitting in a hangar and was arrested. Airport authorities said that steps would be taken to prevent future incursions.

To get its merger with US Airways approved by the Department of Justice (DOJ), American Airlines was forced to give up its 2 gates at Love Field. Delta Air Lines, Southwest Airlines and Virgin America all expressed interest, while the DOJ indicated a low cost carrier should receive the gates. The former American Airlines gates were granted to Virgin America on October 13, 2014, thus denying the gates to Delta and Southwest. In 2018, Virgin America merged into Alaska Airlines, and the two gates assigned to Virgin were transferred to Alaska.

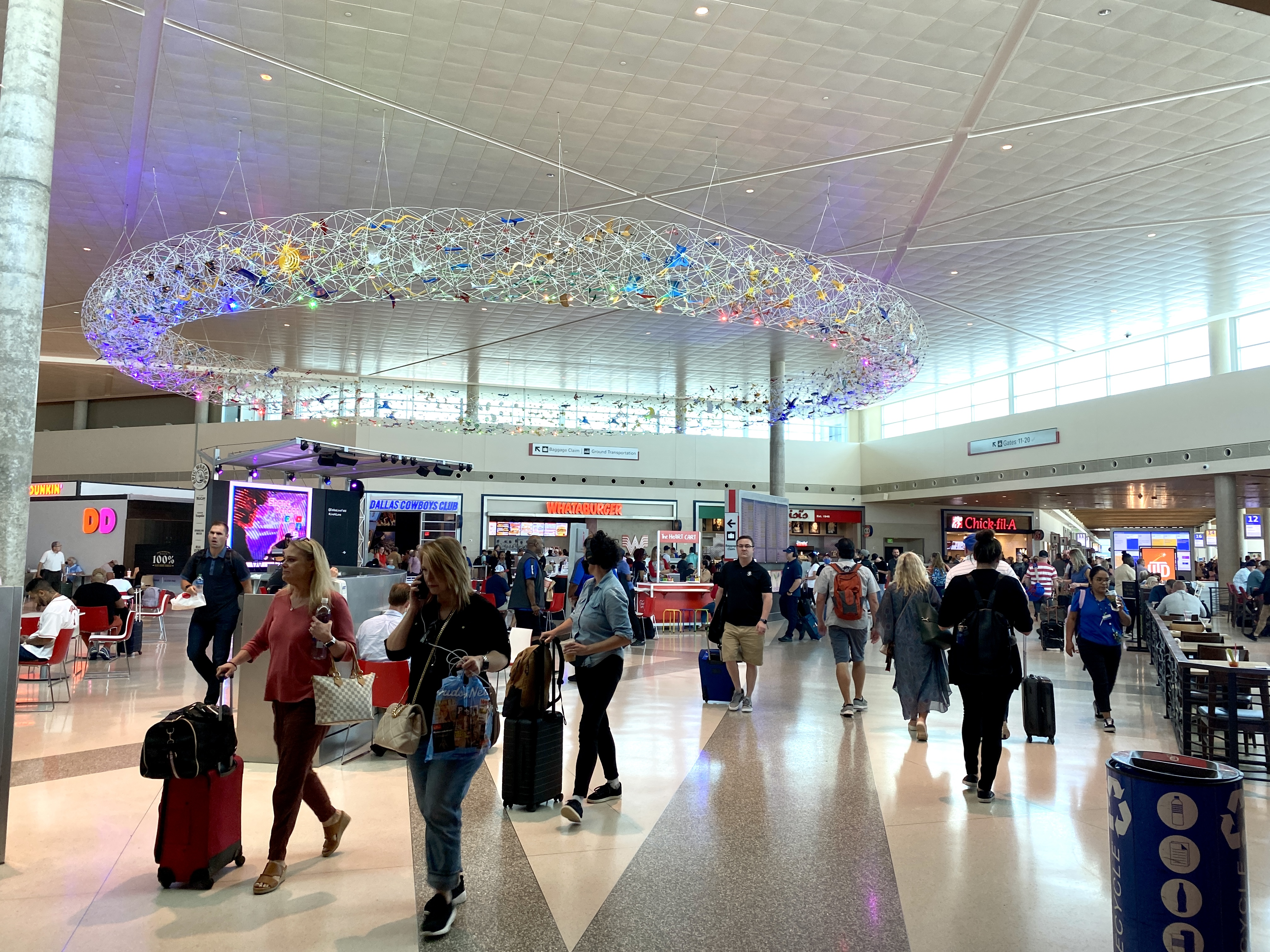
Interior of the renovated terminal

Until 2014, Delta served Love Field by subleasing the use of American's gates. After being notified it would have to cease service at Love, Delta threatened to sue the city of Dallas. Southwest agreed to a temporary resolution by agreeing to sublease gate space to Delta until January 2015. When this agreement expired, United Airlines agreed to allow Delta to use one of its gates until July 2015. United had previously agreed to transfer its gate rights to Southwest. The city of Dallas brought a lawsuit against all parties in June 2015 to resolve the issue in court. In January 2016, Delta won a preliminary injunction to continue service at Love Field using Southwest gate rights. In 2022, the airport settled the lawsuit by leasing back one of the two gates controlled by Alaska Airlines, which had sharply cut its schedule at the airport from 13 flights per day in 2019 to just two in 2022. That gate was then leased to Delta until September 2028. With the settlement in place, Delta announced that it would expand service beyond Atlanta, adding flights to Los Angeles and New York–LaGuardia.

On June 10, 2016, a police officer intervening in a domestic altercation shot and wounded a suspect who rushed at him with a large stone in the vehicle loading zone near the baggage claim. Travelers hearing gunshots stampeded through the security checkpoint, prompting a brief evacuation of the terminal, which in turn caused the cancellation of about 30 flights. This is believed to have been the first shooting ever to take place at the airport.

In 2017, runway 18/36 was converted to a taxiway after low usage due to close proximity to homes.

In November 2020, the carrier JSX began passenger service from Love Field to Houston Hobby, adding competition to the route dominated by Southwest Airlines. JSX operates from a private terminal on the north side of the airport rather than using the main concourse.

On April 22, 2021, the airport initiated a $141 million project to completely demolish and rebuild runway 13R/31L, which was last repaved in 1990 using concrete designed to last 20 years at lighter Wright Amendment traffic levels. The project temporarily left Love Field with only a single usable runway. Airport leaders had hoped to repave the runway while air traffic was reduced by the COVID-19 pandemic, but the project was postponed due to pandemic-related funding uncertainties. The project was completed on June 28, 2022.

On July 25, 2022, a woman drew a gun near the ticket counters outside of the security checkpoint. A nearby Dallas police officer ordered her to drop the weapon; she then fired twice into the air, and was shot in the "lower extremities" in a brief exchange of gunfire with the officer, disabling her. She was then apprehended and hospitalized. The incident prompted an evacuation of the terminal and a ground stop, resulting in the cancellation of over 105 flights. No motive for the woman's actions was identified but she had a history of mental illness and arrests on various charges. She was charged with aggravated assault against a public servant but was found not guilty for reasons of insanity.

On February 11, 2025, Alaska Airlines announced that it would discontinue flights to Love Field on May 14, 2025.

After Alaska Airlines departed from Love Field, Southwest became the only carrier flying out of Alaska's unleased gate 13, with some of their flights having been out of that gate even before the 14th. On August 8, 2025, Love Field noted in their updated competition plan to the FAA that Alaska Airlines entered into a reciprocal licensing agreement with Southwest for them to operate out of the former Alaska gate. The term for that gate expires October 1, 2028, at which time the gate will no longer be eligible for preferential use by Southwest. It will either become a common use gate or be assigned to another airline that isn’t Southwest. The airport is planning on the former.

== Facilities ==
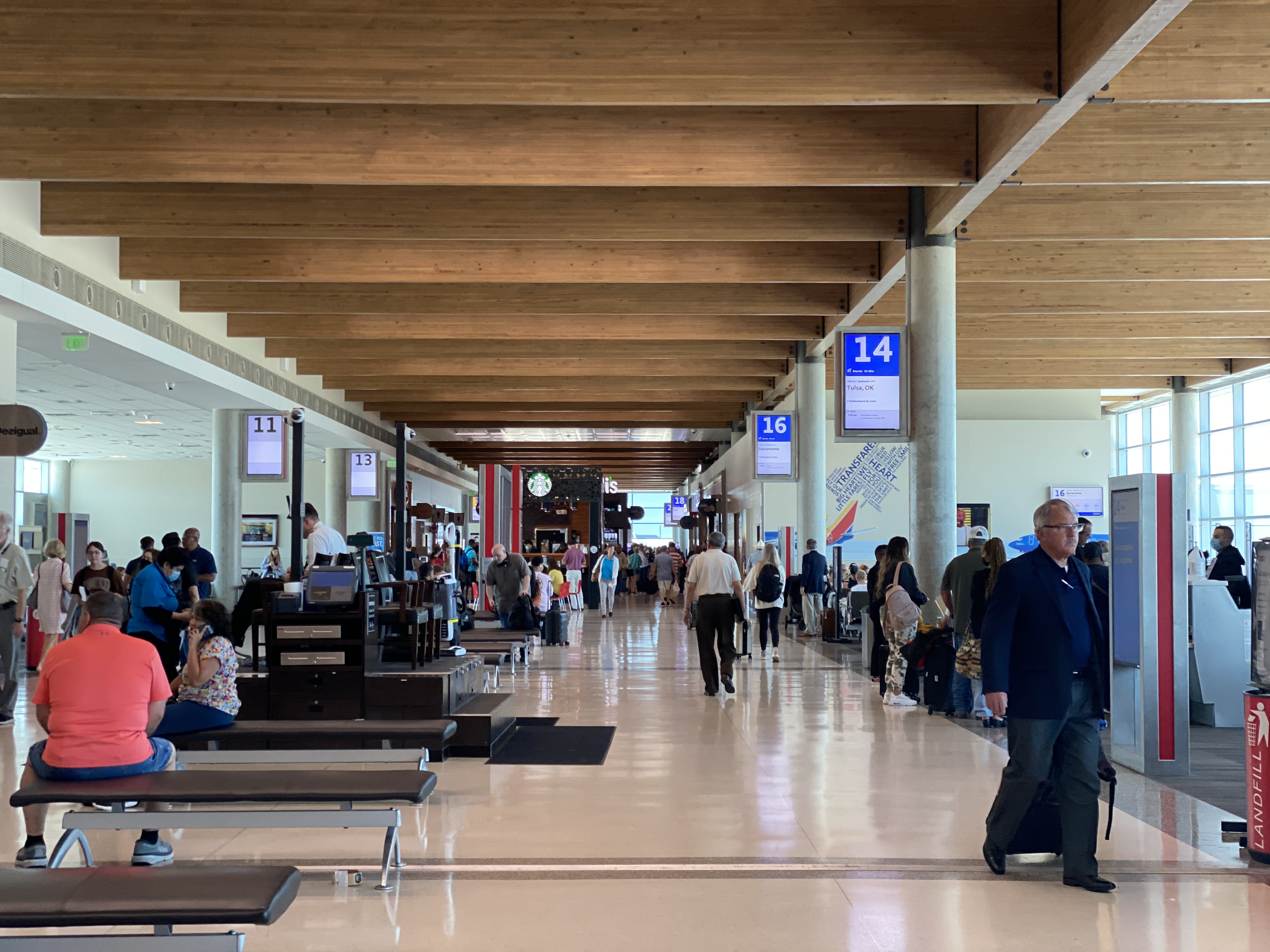
Interior of the departure gates concourse

=== Terminal ===
Dallas Love Field has a single terminal with 20 gates, numbered 1-20. Delta Air Lines leases one gate, while Southwest leases the remaining nineteen gates.

JSX operates from a private terminal on the south side of the airport rather than using the main terminal.

In 2015, a bronze plaque was placed at the inauguration location on the aircraft ramp at Love Field. Donated by historian Farris Rookstool III, a duplicate of it was also placed in the terminal, near a window overlooking the location where Air Force One was parked. A light which can be seen from the window indicates the exact location of the plaque.

=== Ground transportation ===
Dallas Area Rapid Transit (DART) operates the Love Link shuttle, which provides service between the airport terminal and nearby Inwood/Love Field station, which is served by DART's Orange and Green light rail lines. No fares are collected for trips on Love Link shuttles departing the airport terminal.

== Airlines and destinations ==
=== Passenger ===
Airlines	Destinations
Delta Air Lines	Atlanta
JSX	Cabo San Lucas, Denver–Centennial, Hobbs, Houston–Hobby, Lajitas, Las Vegas, Miami–Opa Locka; Seasonal: Destin–Executive, Gunnison/Crested Butte, Scottsdale, Taos
Southwest Airlines	Albuquerque, Amarillo, Atlanta, Austin, Baltimore, Birmingham (AL), Boston, Burbank, Charleston (SC), Charlotte, Chicago–Midway, Cleveland (begins March 11, 2027), Colorado Springs, Columbus–Glenn, Denver, Destin/Fort Walton Beach, Detroit (begins March 11, 2027), El Paso, Fort Lauderdale, Harlingen, Hartford, Houston–Hobby, Indianapolis, Jacksonville (FL), Kansas City, Knoxville, Las Vegas, Little Rock, Long Beach, Los Angeles, Louisville, Lubbock, Memphis, Miami, Midland/Odessa, Milwaukee, Nashville, New Orleans, New York–LaGuardia, Oakland, Oklahoma City, Omaha, Ontario, Orange County, Orlando, Panama City (FL), Pensacola, Philadelphia, Phoenix–Sky Harbor, Pittsburgh, Portland (OR), Raleigh/Durham, Sacramento, Salt Lake City, San Antonio, San Diego, San Francisco, San Jose (CA), Savannah, Seattle/Tacoma, St. Louis, Tampa, Tulsa, Washington–National; Seasonal: Boise, Bozeman, Buffalo, Fort Myers, Fresno, Hayden/Steamboat Springs, Minneapolis/St. Paul, Montrose, Myrtle Beach, Norfolk, Palm Springs, Providence, Reno/Tahoe, Sarasota, Spokane, Tucson

== Statistics ==
=== Passenger numbers ===
Annual passenger traffic at DAL, 1996–present
Year	Passengers	Year	Passengers	Year	Passengers
1996	7,943,085	2006	7,621,787	2016	15,766,840
1997	7,640,832	2007	8,847,017	2017	15,879,390
1998	7,523,453	2008	9,051,693	2018	16,283,754
1999	7,617,246	2009	8,291,149	2019	16,805,145
2000	7,887,188	2010	8,451,810	2020	7,906,545
2001	7,322,642	2011	8,644,160	2021	13,492,008
2002	6,233,725	2012	8,680,886	2022	16,215,036
2003	6,148,927	2013	8,723,917	2023	17,793,529
2004	6,480,860	2014	9,701,413	2024	17,643,336
2005	6,557,239	2015	14,838,496	2025	16,612,267

=== Airline market share ===
Largest airlines at DAL (June 2025 – May 2026)
Rank	Airline	Passengers	Share
1	Southwest Airlines	16,086,864	96.8%
2	Delta Air Lines	339,091	2.0%
3	JSX	144,557	0.9%
4	Eastern Air Express	14,321	0.1%
5	Allegiant Air	10,648	0.1%

=== Top destinations ===
Busiest domestic routes from DAL (June 2025 – May 2026)
Rank	City	Passengers	Carriers
1	Houston–Hobby, Texas	397,758	JSX, Southwest
2	Las Vegas, Nevada	382,953	JSX, Southwest
3	Denver, Colorado	367,534	Southwest
4	Phoenix–Sky Harbor, Arizona	352,780	Southwest
5	Orlando, Florida	351,209	Southwest
6	Atlanta, Georgia	327,035	Delta, Southwest
7	San Antonio, Texas	287,893	Southwest
8	Nashville, Tennessee	282,681	Southwest
9	Chicago–Midway, Illinois	274,805	Southwest
10	New Orleans, Louisiana	230,620	Southwest

== Accidents and incidents ==
- December 23, 1936: A Braniff Airways Lockheed Model 10 Electra airliner, registration number NC-14905, suffered an engine failure during a go-around while conducting a non-scheduled test flight. The aircraft entered a spin and crashed on the northern shore of Bachman Lake when the pilot attempted to turn back toward Love Field. All six Braniff employees aboard died in the crash and ensuing fire.
- November 29, 1949: American Airlines Flight 157, a Douglas DC-6, was on final approach to Runway 36 when the flight crew lost control, causing the airliner to slide off the runway and strike buildings. 26 passengers and two flight attendants died in the crash and ensuing fire; the pilot, co-pilot, flight engineer, and 15 others survived.
- June 28, 1952: A Temco Swift private plane collided with American Airlines Flight 910, a Douglas DC-6 on final approach to Love Field from San Francisco, California; the DC-6 landed safely with no injuries to the 55 passengers and five crew. Both occupants of the Swift died on impact with the ground.
- July 9, 1953: A Southern Air Transport Curtiss-Wright C-46 Commando cargo transport, carrying a crew of two, skidded off the runway and flipped over after a hard landing. The pilot suffered significant injuries; the co-pilot escaped safely.
- May 14, 1960: The pilot of a Beechcraft Bonanza private plane suffered an apparent heart attack and fell unconscious while en route from Fort Worth to Dallas. The pilot's wife and sole passenger, who was not a trained pilot, managed to guide the Bonanza to Love Field but crashed while attempting to land. Both occupants suffered severe injuries and the pilot was pronounced dead, but it is unclear whether his death resulted from the heart attack or from injuries sustained during the crash.
- September 14, 1960: An airline maintenance inspector lost control of a Braniff International Airways Douglas DC-7 during a taxi test and crashed into a hangar at high speed. The inspector died and five of the six mechanics aboard were injured.
- April 18, 1962: A Douglas DC-3 operated by an aviation company affiliated with Purdue University, registration number N3588, crashed immediately after taking off to test a newly installed engine. The craft exploded into flames, killing all three people aboard. The crash was attributed to insufficient airspeed at takeoff, and the National Transportation Safety Board noted that the pilot was not properly qualified to fly a DC-3.
- April 19, 1963: A Beechcraft Bonanza private plane crashed short of the runway on final approach, killing both occupants.
- February 10, 1967: A Beechcraft D18S, registration number N7388, crashed at Love Field after a propeller blade separated during takeoff; the pilot and both passengers died.
- September 27, 1967: All seven occupants of an Aero Commander 560E, registration number N3831C, died after the left-hand wing broke during the landing approach, sending the plane plummeting into Mockingbird Lane in Highland Park, Texas. Wreckage tore through the playground of Bradfield Elementary School. The school was not in session and nobody on the ground was seriously harmed.
- September 29, 1970: After a scheduled flight from Denver, Colorado, the landing gear of a Braniff International Airways Boeing 720, registration number N7080, collapsed during landing. The automatic gear extension mechanism had failed in flight and the flight crew manually lowered the gear but neglected to lock it in the "Down" position. The airliner slid to a halt on the runway, suffering significant damage. There were no injuries to the 47 passengers and seven crew.
- June 7, 1971: A Dallas Police Department Bell 47G-5 helicopter, registration number N2022W, was destroyed when heavy winds blew the craft into an airfield fence during landing; the observer suffered minor injuries and the pilot escaped safely.
- December 26, 1973: The pilot of a Tricon International Airlines Beechcraft C-45H cargo transport, registration number N118X, lost control while circling Love Field for a precautionary landing after being unable to raise the landing gear during takeoff. The C-45 struck two houses southeast of the airport, killing the pilot and injuring a person on the ground. The crash was attributed to insufficient airspeed and improper loading.
- April 18, 1975: A Cessna 310F, registration number N5818X, ran off the end of the runway, struck a fence, and burned after losing engine power during takeoff. The craft's two occupants, a student pilot and flight instructor, escaped with minor injuries. The crash was attributed to fuel starvation: the student pilot had mishandled the fuel control valve (known as the fuel selector) and taken off with the fuel tanks disconnected from the engines.
- June 8, 1976: The pilot of a Cessna 175, registration number N9259B, executed an emergency landing on nearby Mockingbird Lane soon after takeoff from Love Field, striking a telephone pole and a moving automobile. The aircraft was substantially damaged, but there were no serious injuries to the aircraft's four occupants or to the driver of the car. The crash was attributed to insufficient airspeed and overloading.
- April 20, 1990: A Beechcraft Baron 58, registration number N770X, crashed short of Runway 31L, destroying the aircraft and killing the pilot, who was the sole occupant. The pilot had requested permission to return to the airport immediately after takeoff, and a witness reported hearing the engines "sputtering and misfiring" before the crash. NTSB investigators determined that the fuel boost pump controls were set improperly, which would have caused a loss of engine power. The accident was attributed to "The pilot's improper use of the fuel boost pumps for take [sic], and his failure to maintain airspeed above the minimum single engine control speed (V_{MC}), which resulted in a loss of aircraft control."
- January 27, 2000: After its tailplane deicing system failed during the landing approach, a Mitsubishi MU-300 business jet, registration number N900WJ, touched down on Runway 31R at higher-than-normal speed as recommended for such a situation. When it became evident that the aircraft was going to overrun the runway due to the high speed and poor braking action on the slush-covered pavement, the pilot intentionally steered the jet into an embankment to avoid striking light poles past the far end of the runway. There were no injuries to the four passengers or two crew, but the aircraft was written off.
