= Burbank station (DART) =

DART rail station in Dallas, Texas

Burbank
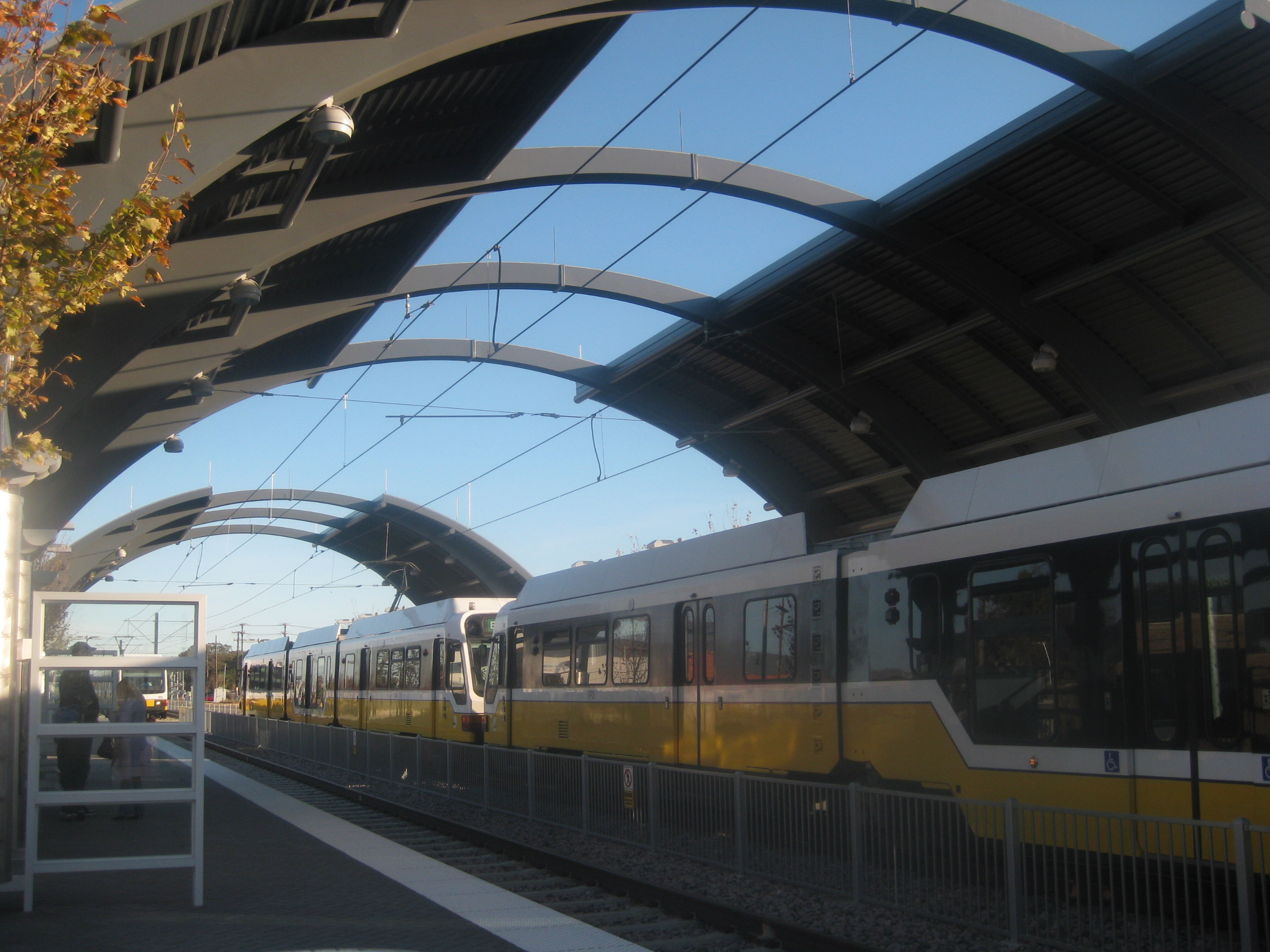
- Green Line train at Burbank station

General information
- Location: 8851 Denton Drive; Dallas, Texas
- Coordinates: 32°50′34″N 96°51′43″W
- System: DART rail
- Owner: Dallas Area Rapid Transit
- Platforms: 2 side platforms
- Tracks: 2

Construction
- Structure type: At-grade
- Cycle facilities: 2 lockers, 1 rack
- Accessible: Yes

History
- Opened: December 6, 2010

Passengers
- FY 2025: 223 (avg. weekday) ▲15.5%

Services
| Preceding station | DART | Following station |
|---|---|---|
| Bachman toward North Carrollton/Frankford | Green Line | Inwood/Love Field toward Buckner |
| Bachman toward DFW Airport Terminal A | Orange Line | Inwood/Love Field toward LBJ/Central or Parker Road |
Location

Burbank station is a DART rail station in Dallas, Texas. The station is served by the Green Line and Orange Line. It is located along Denton Drive, the western barrier road of Dallas Love Field, and serves the headquarters of Southwest Airlines, as well as an adjacent residential neighborhood.

As of the 2025 fiscal year, the station has the lowest ridership of all Green Line stations, with an average of 223 riders on weekdays, 164 riders on Saturdays, and 150 riders on Sundays.

== History ==
Burbank station was originally proposed as Love Field station, a subway station under Dallas Love Field (much like Cityplace/Uptown station), but a 2004 study showed that costs would be well beyond acceptable levels and jeopardize a federal grant. The City of Dallas officials and transit agency agreed to a nearby surface-level station on March 12, 2007. When the Green Line opened in 2010 Inwood/Love Field station was designated for bus service to the airport.
