= Perot Field Fort Worth Alliance Airport =

Airport in Fort Worth, Texas, United States

- FAA airport diagram
- IATA: AFW; ICAO: KAFW; FAA LID: AFW

Summary
- Airport type: Public
- Owner: City of Fort Worth
- Serves: Dallas–Fort Worth metroplex
- Location: Fort Worth, Texas, U.S.
- Opened: December 14, 1989; 36 years ago
- Hub for: FedEx Express
- Focus city for: Amazon Air
- Elevation AMSL: 723 ft (220 m)
- Coordinates: 32°59′25″N 097°19′10″W
- Website: www.allianceairport.com

Map
- Location of airport in Texas AFW/KAFW/AFW (the United States)

Runways
Direction	Length		Surface
Direction	ft	m	Surface
16L/34R	11,000	3,353	Concrete
16R/34L	11,125	3,391	Concrete

Statistics (2023)
- Aircraft operations (year ending 3/31/2023): 109,652
- Based aircraft: 22
- Source: Federal Aviation Administration

Perot Field Fort Worth Alliance Airport (IATA: AFW, ICAO: KAFW, FAA LID: AFW) is a public airport 14 miles (23 km) north of the central business district of Fort Worth, Texas, United States. The airport is owned by the City of Fort Worth and managed by Alliance Air Services, a subsidiary of Hillwood Development, and is, in size, the second-largest airport facility in North Texas, behind only Dallas/Fort Worth International Airport (DFW).

The airport is mainly focused on cargo operations, and serves as a southern regional hub for FedEx Express and focus city for Amazon Air. It provides no major commercial passenger airline service, though it does provide general aviation services. It formerly served as a maintenance hub for Fort Worth-based American Airlines, until the bankruptcy filing and subsequent restructuring of its parent AMR Corporation.

== History ==
Billed as the world's first purely industrial airport, it was developed in a joint venture between the City of Fort Worth, the Federal Aviation Administration and the Hillwood Development Company, a real estate development company owned by Ross Perot Jr.

The official groundbreaking ceremonies were held in July 1988, and the airport officially opened on December 14, 1989. (Note: "History". Fort Worth Alliance Airport. Archived from the original on 2022-06-08.)

Alliance Airport was an occasional source of friction between the cities of Dallas and Fort Worth prior to the repeal of the Wright Amendment, which imposed long-distance flight restrictions at Dallas Love Field after non-compete clauses in the 1968 DFW Concurrent Bond Ordinance signed by Dallas and Fort Worth failed to stop Southwest Airlines from beginning service from Love. The bond agreement prohibited both cities from offering municipal airport services that are "potentially competitive" with DFW. (Note: Zimmerman, Ann (1997-11-06). "Hypocritic oath". Dallas Observer. ISSN 0732-0299. OCLC 7095491.) Fort Worth officials long asserted that, unlike Love Field, Alliance is not a direct competitor to DFW as no attempt was ever made to initiate passenger service there and the FedEx and American Airlines bases would never have been located at DFW.

In the early 1990s, factions in Dallas were calling for Wright Amendment restrictions to be lifted to enhance local airline service. On February 21, 1992, Dallas city leaders threatened to block a proposed US$120 million expansion of Alliance, accusing Fort Worth leaders of undermining support for other local airport projects; Dallas councilman Jerry Bartos, an influential repeal proponent, was accused of trying to make Alliance a negotiating point in his campaign to repeal the Wright Amendment. On February 25, Dallas leaders dropped their objections when it became clear that the planned expansion would not jeopardize federal funding for other local airport projects. On April 8, the city of Fort Worth sued the City of Dallas, accusing Dallas leaders of violating the non-compete clause by scheduling a City Council vote on the Wright Amendment. The 1992 repeal proposal and lawsuit were later dropped after negotiations between the cities, but it was revealed in 1997 that, during a private meeting held on May 11, 1992, influential Fort Worth politicians and civic leaders were seriously concerned that their support for Alliance could give Dallas grounds to countersue Fort Worth for also violating the bond agreement.

In 1993, Russian flag carrier Aeroflot proposed opening a cargo base at Alliance as part of a proposed joint venture with the Perots to expand cargo operations at three airports in Russia. On May 6, 1993, a group of Russian officials negotiating for the proposal arrived at Alliance in an Ilyushin Il-96, the first U.S. visit by the new passenger jet.

In 1998, the Wright Amendment issue resurfaced when Fort Worth and American Airlines sued Dallas, Continental Airlines, Continental Express, and Legend Airlines for supporting the Shelby Amendment, which lifted Wright Amendment restrictions on flights to Alabama, Kansas, and Mississippi. On October 1, 1998, Legend countersued Fort Worth, accusing the city of a "double standard" in its simultaneous support for Alliance and opposition to expansion at Love. Lead Fort Worth attorney Lee Kelly contested the accusations, saying that "neither passenger service, nor any other service, believed to be competitive with the services or interests of [DFW] currently exists [at Alliance]," while Fort Worth mayor Kenneth Barr dismissed attacks on the all-cargo airport as "a bunch of nonsense." On October 29, 1998, State District Judge Bob McCoy dismissed the lawsuit on the grounds that Legend was not a party to the 1968 DFW bond agreement and thus lacked standing to sue.

Alliance stood in for Los Angeles International Airport during the filming of the pilot episode of the short-lived 2004 TV drama LAX.

A US$260 million runway and taxiway extension project was completed in April 2018 to allow heavily loaded cargo aircraft to take off from either runway in hot and high Texas summer weather conditions and reach Europe unrefueled. The project had been under construction since 2003 and required the relocation of nearby sections of Farm to Market Road 156 and a BNSF Railway line. Runways 16R/34L and 16L/34R were previously 8,200 feet (2,500 m) and 9,600 feet (2,900 m) long, respectively. (Note: Dickson, Gordon (2018-04-22). "Will a longer runway at this Fort Worth airport help land more jobs?". Fort Worth Star-Telegram. ISSN 0889-0013.)

In December, 2022, the airport name was changed to Perot Field Fort Worth Alliance Airport in honor of Ross Perot, Sr.

== Facilities and aircraft ==
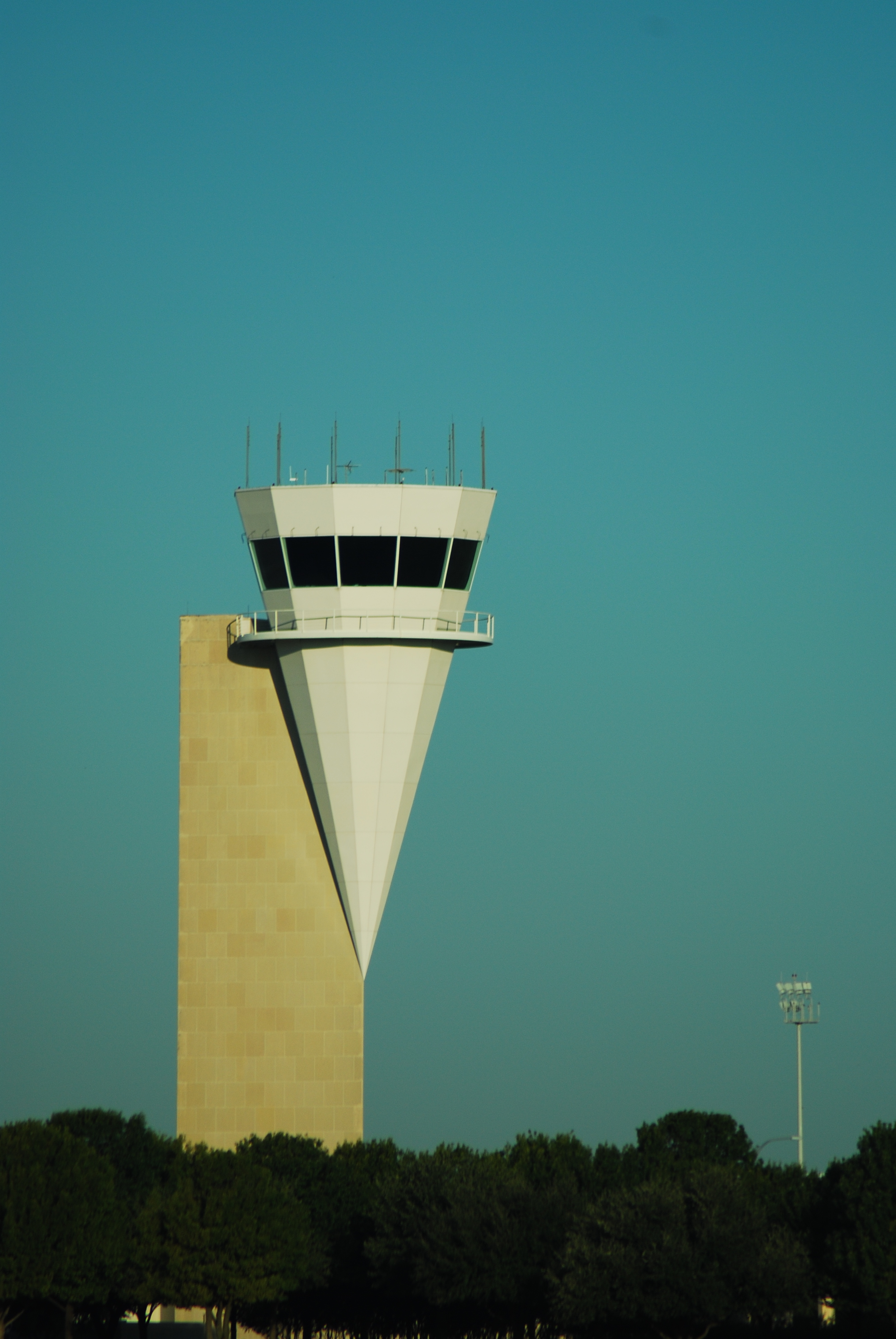
The control tower at Alliance

Fort Worth Alliance Airport covers an area of 1,198 acres (485 ha) and has two concrete runways: 16L/34R measuring 11,000 ft × 150 ft (3,353 m × 46 m) and 16R/34L measuring 11,125 ft × 150 ft (3,391 m × 46 m).

For the year ending March 31, 2023, the airport had 109,652 aircraft operations, averaging 300 per day: 61% general aviation, 18% air carrier, 10% military, and 11% air taxi. As of March 31, 2023, there were 22 aircraft based at this airport: 1 single-engine, 5 multi-engine, 8 jet and 8 helicopter.

== Airlines and destinations ==
=== Cargo ===
Airlines	Destinations
Amazon Air	Allentown, Atlanta, Boise, Charlotte, Chicago–O’Hare, Hartford, Los Angeles, Lakeland, Las Vegas, Manchester (NH), Minneapolis/St. Paul, Mobile–International, Miami, New Orleans, Nashville, New York–JFK, Ontario, Portland (OR), Richmond, San Francisco, Seattle/Tacoma, Toledo
FedEx Express	Atlanta, Chicago–O'Hare, Denver, Fort Lauderdale, Harlingen, Houston–Intercontinental, Indianapolis, Kansas City, Laredo, Los Angeles, Memphis, Minneapolis/St. Paul, Newark, Oakland, Phoenix, San Antonio Seasonal: St. Louis, Tulsa
Fedex Feeder operated by Empire Airlines	Lubbock, Midland
Fedex Feeder operated by Baron Aviation	Austin, Midland

Cargo destinations map
- Cargo destinations from Perot Field Fort Worth Alliance Airport

== Major tenants ==
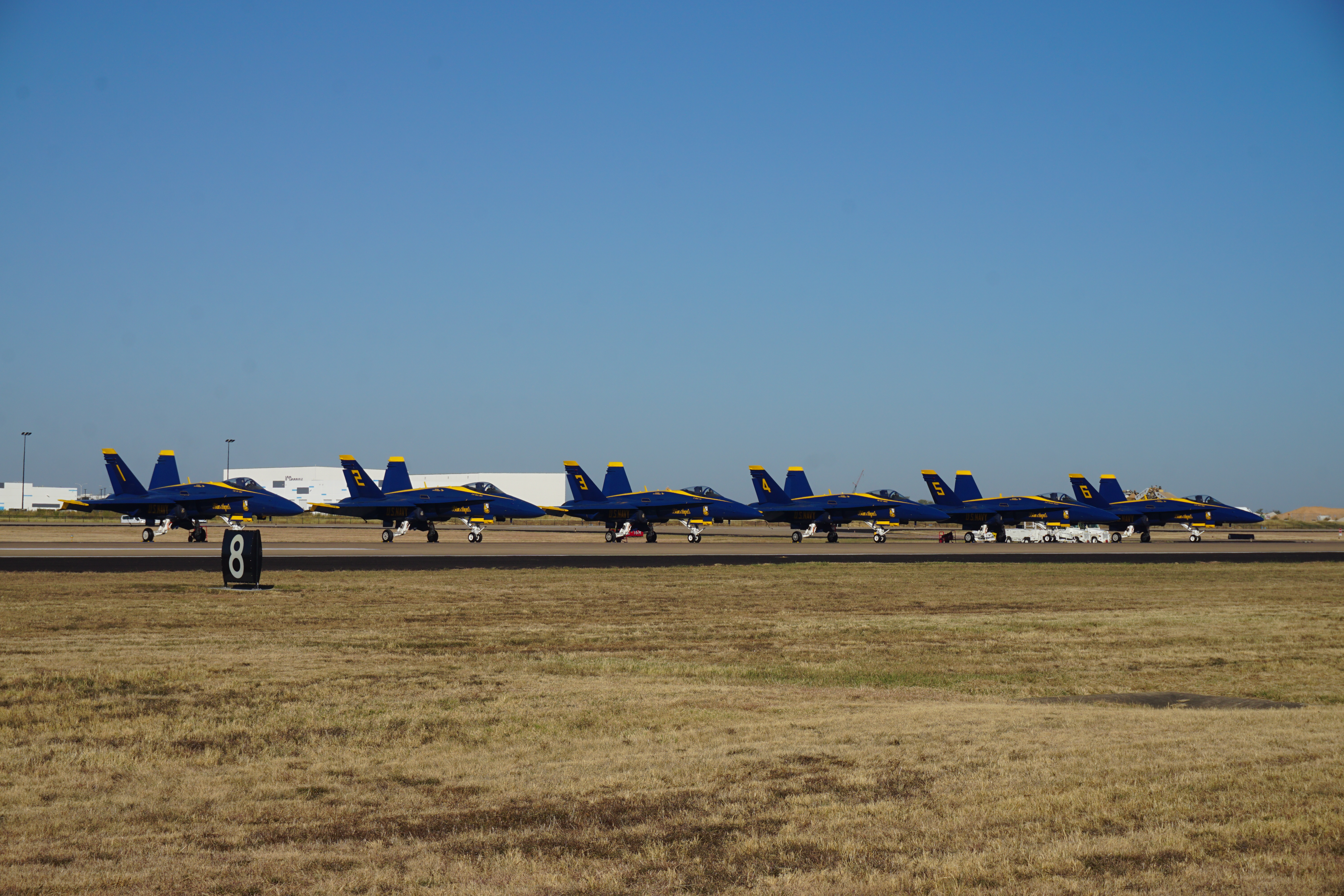
Blue Angels F/A-18 Hornets at the 2019 Fort Worth Alliance Air Show

American Airlines was previously the largest tenant at the airport, operating a major maintenance base which closed in December 2012 as part of AMR's Chapter 11 reorganization. Current major tenants include:

- Amazon Air (new hub opened on October 2, 2019)
- BNSF Railway (Alliance intermodal facility)
- Bell Helicopter Textron (customer acceptance center)
- Drug Enforcement Administration (aviation operations center)
- DynCorp International (main operations center)
- FedEx (southwest regional sorting hub; FedEx also operates from Dallas/Fort Worth International Airport's east cargo facility)
- Aspire MRO (aircraft modification company currently occupying the ex-American Airlines facility) (Note: https://finance.yahoo.com/news/aspire-mro-announces-launch-widebody-140100148.html)
- Tarrant County College – Aviation Learning Center (2014) (Note: Collins, Mike (2015-04-05). "Happy Anniversary, Alliance". AOPA. Archived from the original on 2023-04-25.)
- Gulfstream Aerospace (Maintenance Service Center)

== Accidents and incidents ==
- April 8, 1992: A student pilot in a Cessna 150, registration number N67816, became lost during a nighttime solo cross-country flight and initiated an emergency landing at Alliance when the aircraft began losing power; the aircraft struck power lines and a tree on approach, causing substantial aircraft damage and minor injuries. The accident was attributed to fuel exhaustion caused by the pilot's failure to refuel the aircraft during an earlier stop; a factor was the pilot's inadvertent disorientation. (Note: This article incorporates public domain material from National Transportation Safety Board Aviation Accident Final Report. National Transportation Safety Board. (FTW92FA107).)
- February 17, 2001: A Piper PA-32, N8355L, was on approach when propeller RPM suddenly increased and engine instruments indicated zero oil pressure. The aircraft lost power and was substantially damaged during the subsequent off-airport forced landing; one pilot suffered serious injuries, while a second pilot and two passengers suffered minor injuries. The accident was attributed to the improper installation of engine oiling parts by unknown persons; a contributing factor was a lack of suitable terrain for the forced landing. (Note: This article incorporates public domain material from National Transportation Safety Board Aviation Accident Final Report. National Transportation Safety Board. (FTW01LA068).)
- May 29, 2011: The owner-pilot and a flight instructor in a Eurocopter AS350 Écureuil, N747CH, lost control during low-altitude practice maneuvers with the hydraulic assist for the flight controls switched off. The aircraft crashed and caught fire and all three occupants suffered minor injuries. Investigators found that Eurocopter advised against attempting low-altitude, low-speed maneuvers without hydraulic assistance. The accident was attributed to the pilot's loss of control, and to inadequate supervision and delayed remedial response by the flight instructor. (Note: This article incorporates public domain material from National Transportation Safety Board Aviation Accident Final Report. National Transportation Safety Board. (CEN11FA359).)

== See also ==
- List of airports in Texas
