= T. Allan McArtor =

American government official

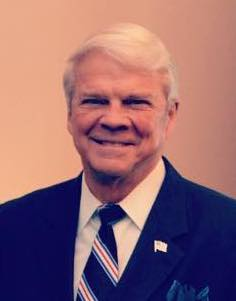
T. Allan McArtor in 2018

Trusten Allan McArtor (born July 3, 1942) was the Administrator of the U.S. Federal Aviation Administration from 1987 to 1989.

Born in St. Louis, Missouri in 1942, McArtor is Chairman of Airbus North America Holdings, Inc., parent company of Airbus North America Sales, Inc. and Airbus North America Customer Services, Inc., all located in Herndon, Virginia, and Airbus North America Engineering in Wichita, Kansas. Named Chairman in June 2001, McArtor oversees the activities of Airbus in the United States and Canada in several key areas, including governmental affairs. Airbus functions in North America include marketing and sales support for airlines and other customers, as well as product and technical support, and training for pilots, flight attendants and maintenance specialists.

Before joining Airbus, McArtor was founder, chairman and chief executive officer of Legend Airlines, a scheduled passenger air carrier operating jet aircraft that was based at Dallas Love Field, Texas. Prior to that, McArtor held a series of leadership and senior management positions in the military, civil and government sectors.

From 1979 to 1994, McArtor served on the senior management team of Federal Express Corporation - except for two years (1987-1989) when President Ronald Reagan appointed McArtor to serve as the Administrator of the Federal Aviation Administration (FAA). During that time, McArtor was credited with helping to regain public confidence in air transportation in the U.S., while accelerating the modernization of air traffic control (ATC). He was also active in gaining increased FAA funding for ATC and other critical programs, including Extended Twin OperationS (ETOPS) and Traffic Collision Avoidance System (TCAS). In addition, McArtor created the standards for “Aging Aircraft” regulations and issued the industry's Stage III noise regulations.

While at Federal Express, McArtor's responsibilities included oversight of maintenance, operation, training, scheduling and planning for the carrier's global airline operations, including the successful merger of the Flying Tigers air cargo airline into the Federal Express operations and the development of the long-range fleet plan, which first introduced Airbus A300-600R freighters. Also at Federal Express, McArtor served as Senior Vice President for Telecommunications.

McArtor is a 1964 graduate of the U.S. Air Force Academy (BSE) and was the Cadet Wing Commander. In addition, he holds a master's degree (MSE) from Arizona State University.

McArtor was a highly decorated combat fighter pilot in Vietnam, an Associate Professor of Engineering Mechanics at the Air Force Academy, and capped his Air Force career as a pilot with the U.S. Air Force “Thunderbirds” Aerial Demonstration Team. McArtor continues to hold a Commercial Pilot's license (instrument rating, multi-engine) and is a member of Tau Beta Pi (engineering honorary society).

McArtor serves on the Board of Directors of: EADS North America, Inc.; The European Institute; Washington Area Airports Authority; Aviation Safety Alliance; GKN Aerospace Transparency Systems; Committee for Economic Development; and Platinum Research Organization, LLC. He is a member of the International Policy Committee and Homeland Security Committee, U.S. Chamber of Commerce. He has also served on the boards of: Excel Communication, Inc.; Teleglobe of Canada; Learjet, Inc.; Fairchild Space and Defense Company (a MATRA company); and Angel Technologies. McArtor serves on the boards of a number of civic, industry, charity and educational groups, including the Falcon Foundation Executive Committee, Sabre Society, Air Force Memorial Foundation Board of Trustees, and St. Jude Children's Research Hospital Professional Advisory Board.

Allan and Grace McArtor have two sons and five grandchildren.

Government offices
Preceded by Donald D. Engen	Administrator of the Federal Aviation Administration; 1987–1989	Succeeded by James B. Busey
