= Renat =

Renat is a masculine given name and a surname.

It is derived from the Latin name Renatus.

In Russia it is found as Russian: Ренат and is cognate to Rinat.

Notable people with the given name include:

- Renat Ataullin (born 1965), Russian footballer
- Renat Baratov (born 1991), Russian footballer
- Renat Dadashov (born 1999), Azerbaijani footballer
- Renat Dubinskiy (born 1979), Kazakhstani footballer
- Renat Gafurov (born 1982), Russian motorcycle rider
- Renat Gagity (born 1995), Russian footballer
- Renat Heuberger (born 1976), Swiss businessman
- Renat Kuzmin (born 1967), Ukrainian politician
- Renat Mamashev (born 1983), Russian ice hockey player
- Renat Mirzaliyev (born 1982), Ukrainian judoka
- Renat Mochulyak (born 1998), Ukrainian footballer
- Renat Nelli (1906-1982), French author
- Renat Sabitov (born 1985), Russian footballer
- Renat Saidov (born 1988), Russian judoka
- Renat Sokolov (born 1984), Russian footballer
- Renat Yanbayev (born 1984), Russian footballer

Notable people with the surname include:

- Elisabet Renat (d. 1752), Swedish industrialist
- Grace Renat (born 1949), Mexican actress
- Johan Gustaf Renat (1682-1744), Swedish cartographer
