= Renato =

Renato is a masculine given name. It is derived from the Latin name Renatus.

Notable people with the name used mononymously include:

- San Renato, a saint of the Catholic Church
- Renato (footballer, born 1940) (Renato Pires da Silva), Brazilian footballer
- Renato (footballer, born 1944) (Renato Cunha Valle), Brazilian footballer
- Renato (footballer, born 1957) (Carlos Renato Frederico), Brazilian footballer
- Renato (footballer, born 1979) (Renato Dirnei Florêncio Santos), Brazilian footballer
- Renato (footballer, born 1998) (Renato Barbosa Vischi), Brazilian footballer

Notable people with the name include:

- Carlos Renato de Abreu (born 1978), Brazilian footballer
- Renato Aragão (born 1936), Brazilian comedian and actor
- Renato Archer (1922–1996), Brazilian naval officer and politician
- Renato Augusto (born 1988), Brazilian footballer
- Renato Bartilotti (born 1976), Mexican actor
- Renato Beghe (1933–2012), United States Tax Court judge
- Renato Birolli (1905–1959), Italian painter
- Renato Borghetti (born 1963), Brazilian folk musician and composer
- Renato Brunetta (born 1950), Italian economist and politician
- Renato Caccioppoli (1904–1959), mathematician
- Renato Canova, athletics coach
- Renato Capecchi, Italian opera singer
- Renato Carosone, Italian pianist
- Renato Casaro (1935–2025), Italian movie poster artist
- Renato Cellini, Italian conductor
- Renato Cesarini (1906–1969), Italian-Argentine footballer and coach
- Renato Chiantoni, Italian actor
- Renato Constantino (1919–1999), Filipino historian
- Renato Corona (1948–2016), Filipino lawyer and Supreme Court chief judge
- Renato Corsetti (born 1941), president of the World Esperanto Association
- Renato Curcio (born 1941), former leader of the Italian Red Brigades
- Renato D'Aiello, Italian saxophonist
- Renato de Albuquerque, Brazilian civil engineer and entrepreneur
- Renato de Villa (born 1935), Filipino political figure
- Renato del Prado (1940–2013), Filipino actor
- Renato Dulbecco (1914–2012), virologist
- Renato Fratini (1932–1973), Italian commercial artist
- Renato Gaúcho (born 1962), Brazilian footballer
- Renato Guttuso (1911–1987), Italian expressionist painter
- Renato Janine Ribeiro, Brazilian political philosopher
- Renato Jorge (born 1973), Portuguese footballer and coach
- Renato López (born 1983), Mexican television show host and musician
- Renato Leduc, Mexican poet and newspaper writer
- Renato Machado (1943–2026), Brazilian newscaster and journalist
- Renato Malavasi, Italian actor
- Renato Martino, Italian Cardinal Deacon
- Renato Micallef (born 1951), Maltese pop singer
- Renato Migliorini, Brazilian physician and scientist
- Renato Naranja, Chess master
- Renato Núñez, Baseball player
- Renato Pagliari, Italian singer
- Renato Peduzzi (1839–1884), Italian sculptor
- Renato Pirocchi (1933–2002), Italian race car driver
- Renato Pozzetto, Italian comedian
- Renato Ribeiro, Brazilian footballer
- Renato Eduardo de Oliveira Ribeiro (born 1985), Brazilian footballer
- Renato Rosaldo, American anthropologist
- Renato Ruggiero (1930–2013), Italian politician
- Renato Ruiz, Mexican wrestler
- Renato Russo (born 1960–1996), Brazilian singer and composer
- Renato M. E. Sabbatini (born 1947), Brazilian scientist and writer
- Renato Salvatori, Italian movie actor
- Renato Sanches (born 1997), Portuguese footballer
- Renato Sobral (born 1975), Brazilian MMA fighter
- Renato Soru (born 1957), Italian entrepreneur
- Renato Tapia, Peruvian footballer
- Renato Terra, Italian actor and poet
- Renato Ulrich (born 1983), Swiss freestyle skier
- Renato Vallanzasca, Italian mobster
- Renato Villalta (born 1955), Italian basketball player
- Renato Zanelli, Chilean baritone and tenor

== See also ==
- Renata
