= Renatus =

Renatus is a first name of Latin origin which means "born again" ("natus" = "born").

The name has a spiritual meaning, i.e., to be born again with baptism, i.e., from water and the Holy Spirit. It was extensively adopted by early Christians in ancient Rome, due to the importance of baptism. The onomastic is Saint Renatus, a martyr, Bishop of Sorrento in the 5th century, who is celebrated on 6 October.

In Persian Mithraism, which spread widely in the West as a religion of the soldiers and officials under the Roman Empire, persons initiated into its mysteries were designated renatus (with the meaning of regenerated).

Notable people with this forename include:

- Renatus Cartesius (1596–1650), also known as René Descartes, French philosopher, mathematician, scientist and writer
- Publius Flavius Vegetius Renatus, Later Roman Empire writer (4th century)
- Renatus Profuturus Frigeridus, historian (5th century)
- Renatus of Châlon (1519–1544), Prince of the House of Orange
- Renatus Harris (1652–1724), English master organ maker

== Derived names ==
In Italian, Portuguese and Spanish it exists in masculine and feminine forms: Renato and Renata.

In French they have been translated to René and Renée.

Renata is a common female name in the Czech Republic, Croatia, Lithuania, Poland and Slovakia.

The feminine Renate is common in German, Dutch and Norwegian.

In Russia the names Renat (Russian: Ренат) (usually as Rinat) and Renata (Russian: Рената) are widespread among the Tatar population.
