= Renate (disambiguation) =

Renate is a feminine given name.

Renate may also refer to:

- Renate, Lombardy, the Italian municipality
- 575 Renate, the minor planet
- AC Renate, Italian association football club
