= Peduzzi =

Peduzzi is a surname, originating from Northern Italy.

- Anna Maria Peduzzi (1912–1979), Italian racing driver
- Émile-Gustave Cavallo-Péduzzi (1851–1917), French painter
- Renato Peduzzi (active 19th Century, died 1894), Italian sculptor
- Richard Peduzzi (born 1943), French scenographer
