= Renata =

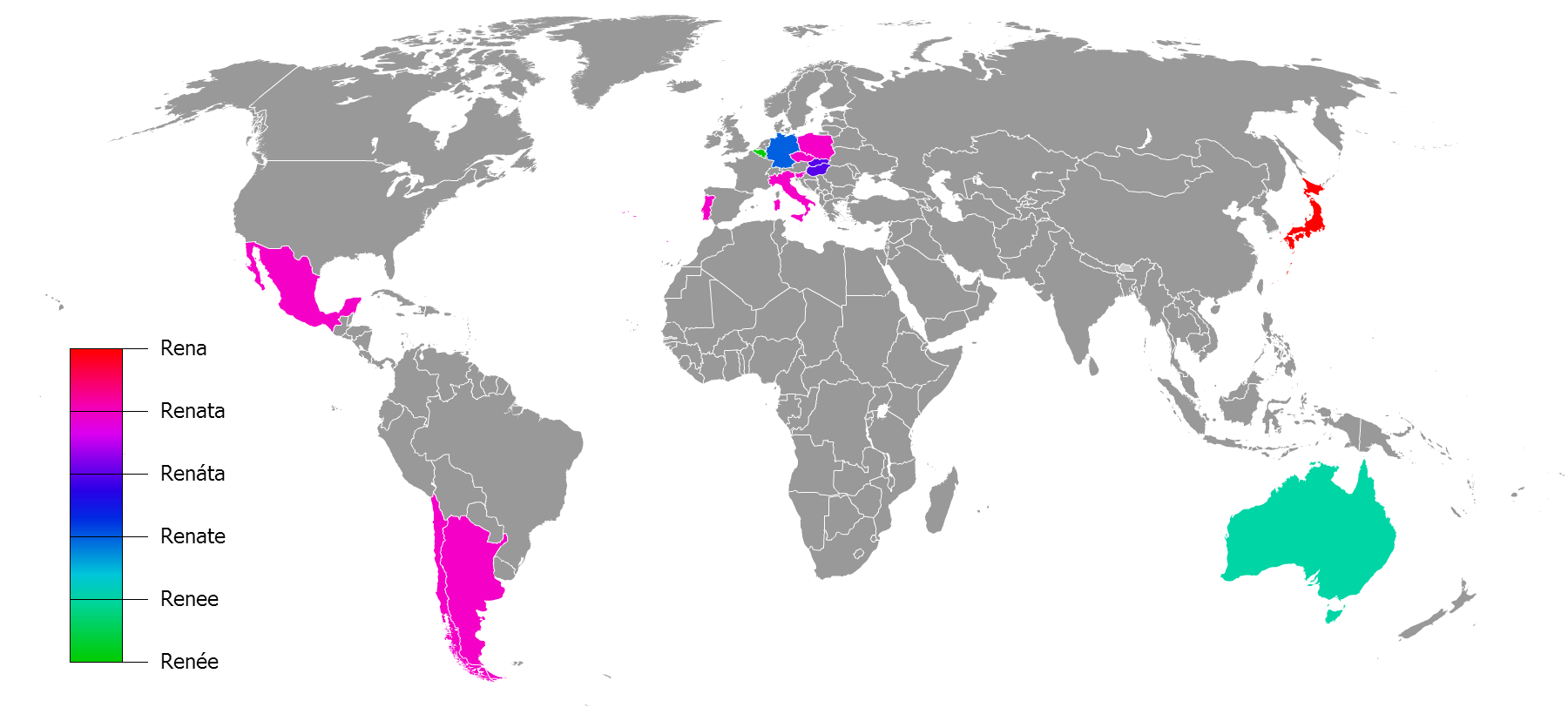
Popularity of the name Renata

Renata is a feminine given name of European origin, and a Maori surname.

The name is of Latin origin of Renatus.

The cognate names include Renée and Renate.

Notable people with the given name Renata include:

- Renata Adler (born 1938), American author, journalist and film critic
- Renata Alt (born 1965), Slovakian born German politician
- Renata Beger (born 1958), Polish politician
- Renata Berková (born 1975), Czech triathlon athlete
- Renata Borgatti (1894–1964), concert pianist
- Renata Briano (born 1964), Italian politician
- Renata Bueno (born 1979), Brazilian-Italian politician
- Renata Burgos (born 1982), Brazilian swimmer
- Renata Carvalho (born 1981), Brazilian actress, playwright and theater director
- Renáta Csay (born 1977), Hungarian canoeist
- Renata Dancewicz (born 1969), Polish actress
- Renata Diniz (born 2008), Brazilian rhythmic gymnast
- Renata Dominguez (born 1980), Brazilian actress and television presenter
- Renata Fast (born 1994), Canadian hockey player
- Renata Flambe, fictional opera diva on A Prairie Home Companion, played by Renée Fleming
- Renáta Fučíková (born 1964), Czech book illustrator, artist and author of children's books
- Renata Huerta (born 2004), Mexican professional footballer
- Renata Jamrichova (born 2007), Slovak tennis player
- Renata Janik (born 1965), Polish politician
- Renata Jaworska (born 1979), Polish artist
- Renata Katewicz (born 1965), Polish discus thrower
- Renata Kallosh (born 1943), Ukrainian-American theoretical physicist
- Renata Kolarova (born 1966), Swiss former speed skier
- Renata Končić (born 1977), Croatian singer
- Renata Lavagnini (born 1942), Italian Neo-Hellenist and Byzantinist
- Renata Masciarelli (born 1997), Mexican footballer
- Renata Nielsen (born 1966), Danish long jumper
- Renata Przemyk (born 1966), Polish singer-songwriter
- Renata Ruiz (born 1984), Chilean model
- Renata Salecl (born 1962), Slovene philosopher, sociologist and legal theorist
- Renata Scotto (1934–2023), Italian soprano and opera director
- Renata Shakirova (born 1995), Uzbek ballerina at Mariinsky Theatre
- Renata Silveira (born 1989), Brazilian sports commentator and journalist
- Renata Soñé (born 1982), Dominican Republic beauty queen and actress
- Renata Sorrah (born 1947), Brazilian actress
- Renata Strašek (born 1972), Slovenian javelin thrower
- Renata Tebaldi (1922–2004), Italian opera singer
- Renáta Tolvai (born 1991), Romanian Hungarian singer, dancer and model
- Renata Vaca (born 1999), Mexican and Nicaraguan actress and singer
- Renata Vasconcellos (born 1972), Brazilian journalist
- Renata Vesecká (born c. 1960), Czech lawyer
- Renata Voráčová (born 1983), Czech tennis player
- Renata Wentzcovitch, Brazilian condensed matter physicist
- Renata Zarazúa, (born 1997), Mexican tennis player
- Cecilia Renata of Austria (1611–1644), Archduchess, daughter of Ferdinand II, Holy Roman Emperor

Notable people with the surname Renata include:

- Trent Renata (born 1988), New Zealand rugby player
