= Renatinho =

Renatinho is a hypocorism of the name Renato and means "Little Renato" or "Renato Jr." in Portuguese.

Renatinho may refer to:

- Renatinho (footballer, born 1981), Brazilian football forward
- Renatinho (footballer, born 1987), Brazilian football forward
- Renatinho (footballer, born May 1988), Brazilian football defender
- Renatinho (footballer, born October 1988), Brazilian football midfielder
- Renatinho (footballer, born 1991), Brazilian football midfielder
- Renatinho (footballer, born 1992), Brazilian football midfielder

== See also ==
- Renato
