= Born again =

Evangelical Christian term

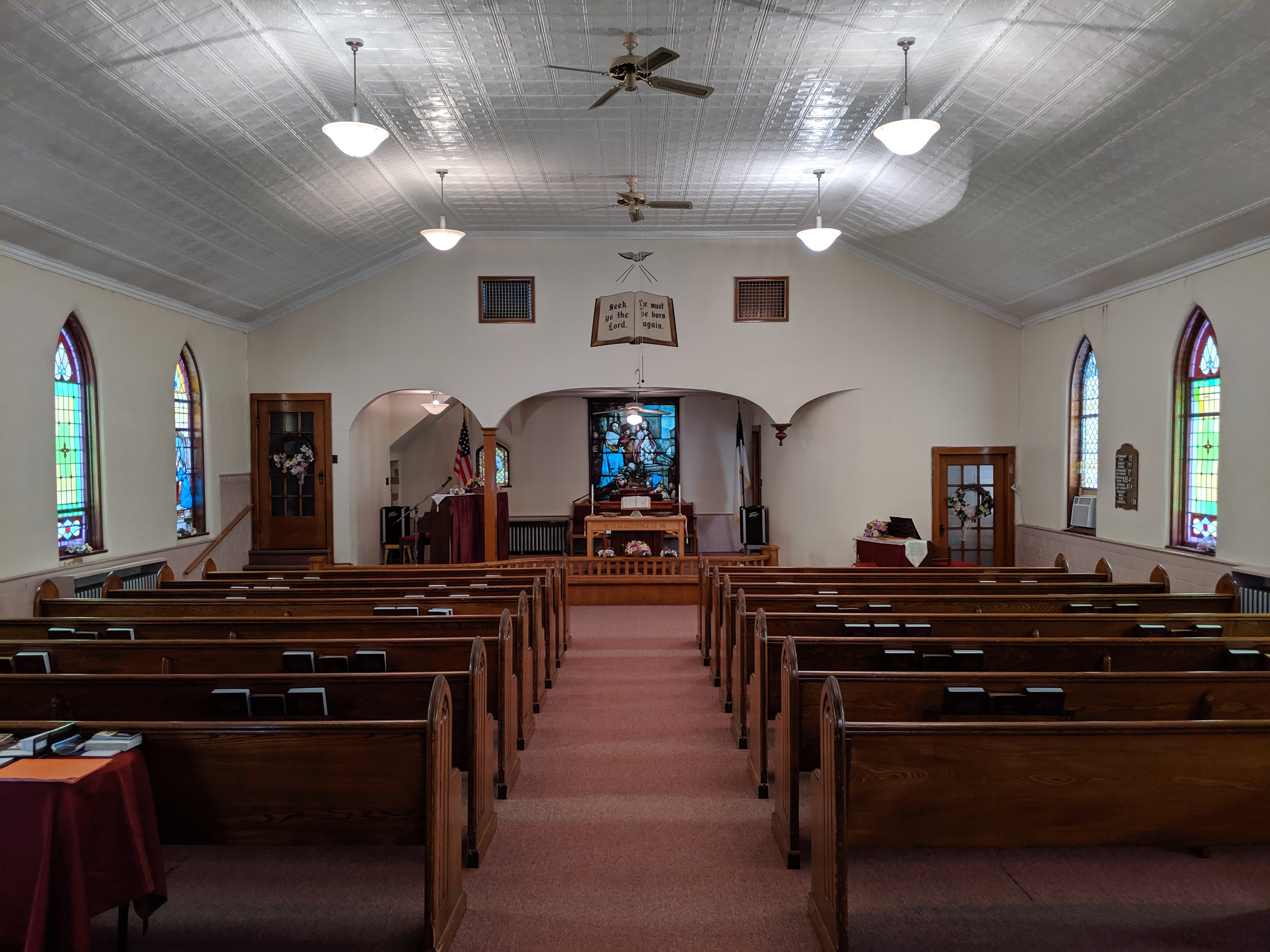
Artwork on the chancel arch of White Memorial Wesleyan Methodist Church in Struthers, Ohio depicting the biblical verse on the New Birth (first work of grace): "Ye must be born again" (John 3:7), a core Methodist doctrine

To be born again, or to experience the new birth, is a phrase, particularly in evangelical Christianity, that refers to a "spiritual rebirth", or a regeneration of the human spirit. In contrast to one's physical birth, being "born again" is distinctly and separately caused by the operation of the Holy Spirit. It occurs when one accepts Jesus Christ as their personal Lord and Savior, upon which point they are said to have "died" to their sinful state and been born into a new, saved life. While all Christians are familiar with the concept from the Bible, it is a core doctrine of the denominations of the Moravian, Methodist, Plymouth Brethren, Pentecostal and Radical Pietist churches along with other evangelical Christian denominations, such as evangelical Quakers and Baptists. These churches stress Jesus's words in the Gospels: "Do not be astonished that I said to you, 'You must be born from above.'" (John 3:7). (Note: In some English translations, the phrase "born again" is rendered as "born from above".) Their doctrines also hold that to be "born again", and thus "saved", one must have a personal and intimate relationship with Jesus Christ.

The term born again has its origin in the New Testament. In the First Epistle of Peter, the author describes the new birth as taking place from the seed which is the Word of God. In the Gospel of Luke, Jesus himself refers to the Word of God as the seed.

In contemporary Christian usage and apart from evangelicalism, the term is distinct from similar terms which are sometimes used in Christianity in reference to a person who is, or is becoming, a Christian. This usage of the term is usually linked to baptism with water and the related doctrine of baptismal regeneration. Individuals who profess to be "born again" (meaning born in the "Holy Spirit") often state that they have a "personal relationship with Jesus Christ".

== Origin ==
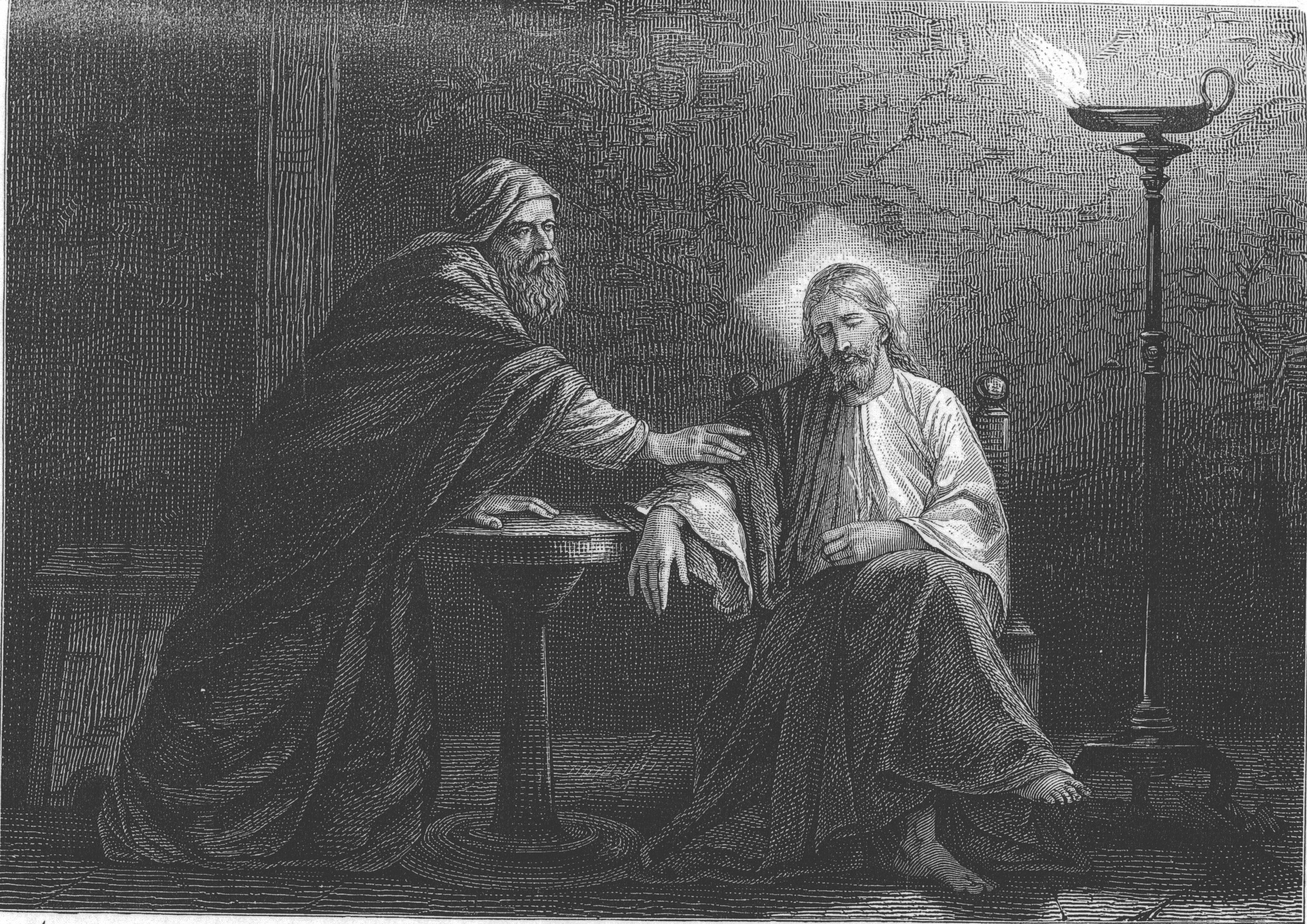
Jesus and Nicodemus, painting by Alexandre Bida, 1874

The term is derived from an event in the Gospel of John in which the words of Jesus were not understood by a Jewish Pharisee, Nicodemus:

Jesus replied, "Very truly I tell you, no one can see the kingdom of God unless they are born again." "How can someone be born when they are old?" Nicodemus asked. "Surely they cannot enter a second time into their mother's womb to be born!" Jesus answered, "Very truly I tell you, no one can enter the kingdom of God unless they are born of water and the Spirit."

— Gospel of John, chapter 3, verses 3–5, New International Version

The Gospel of John was written in Koine Greek, and the original text is ambiguous which results in a double entendre that Nicodemus misunderstands. The word translated as 'again' is ἄνωθεν (ánōthen), which could mean either 'again', or 'from above'. The double entendre is a figure of speech that the gospel writer uses to create bewilderment or misunderstanding in the hearer; the misunderstanding is then clarified by either Jesus or the narrator. Nicodemus takes only the literal meaning from Jesus's statement, while Jesus clarifies that he means more of a spiritual rebirth from above. English translations have to pick one sense of the phrase or another; the NIV, King James Version, and Revised Version use "born again", while the New Revised Standard Version and the New English Translation prefer the "born from above" translation. Most versions will note the alternative sense of the phrase ánōtʰen in a footnote.

Edwyn Hoskyns argues that "born from above" is to be preferred as the fundamental meaning and he drew attention to phrases such as "birth of the Spirit", "birth from God", but maintains that this necessarily carries with it an emphasis upon the newness of the life as given by God himself.

The final use of the phrase occurs in the First Epistle of Peter, rendered in the King James Version as:

Seeing ye have purified your souls in obeying the truth through the Spirit unto unfeigned love of the brethren, [see that ye] love one another with a pure heart fervently: / Being born again, not of corruptible seed, but of incorruptible, by the word of God, which liveth and abideth for ever.

— 1 Peter 1:22–23

Here, the Greek word translated as 'born again' is ἀναγεγεννημένοι (anagegennēménoi).

=== Interpretations ===
The traditional Jewish understanding of the promise of salvation is interpreted as being rooted in "the seed of Abraham"; that is, physical lineage from Abraham. Jesus explained to Nicodemus that this doctrine was in error – that every person must have two births – natural birth of the physical body and another of the water and the spirit. This discourse with Nicodemus established the Christian belief that all human beings – whether Jew or Gentile – must be "born again" of the spiritual seed of Christ. This understanding is further reinforced in 1 Peter 1:23. The Catholic Encyclopedia states that "[a] controversy existed in the primitive church over the interpretation of the expression the seed of Abraham. It is [the First Epistle of Peter's] teaching in one instance that all who are Christ's by faith are Abraham's seed, and heirs according to promise. He is concerned, however, with the fact that the promise is not being fulfilled to the seed of Abraham (referring to the Jews)."

Charles Hodge writes that "The subjective change wrought in the soul by the grace of God, is variously designated in Scripture" with terms such as new birth, resurrection, new life, new creation, renewing of the mind, dying to sin and living to righteousness, and translation from darkness to light.

Jesus used the "birth" analogy in tracing spiritual newness of life to a divine beginning. Contemporary Christian theologians have provided explanations for "born from above" being a more accurate translation of the original Greek word transliterated ánōtʰen. Theologian Frank Stagg cites two reasons why the newer translation is significant:

1. The emphasis "from above" (implying "from Heaven") calls attention to the source of the "newness of life". Stagg writes that the word 'again' does not include the source of the new kind of beginning;
2. More than personal improvement is needed; "a new destiny requires a new origin, and the new origin must be from God."

An early example of the term in its more modern use appears in the sermons of John Wesley. In the sermon entitled A New Birth he writes, "none can be holy unless he be born again", and "except he be born again, none can be happy even in this world. For [...] a man should not be happy who is not holy." Also, "I say, [a man] may be born again and so become an heir of salvation." Wesley also states infants who are baptized are born again, but for adults it is different:

our church supposes, that all who are baptized in their infancy, are at the same time born again. [...] But [...] it is sure all of riper years, who are baptized, are not at the same time born again.

A Unitarian work called The Gospel Anchor noted in the 1830s that the phrase was not mentioned in any of the Gospels, (Note: Though the canonical gospels are traditionally attributed to the Four Evangelists, modern scholarship views all four as anonymously written, and later attributed to the Evangelists.) nor by any Epistles except in that of 1 Peter. "It was not regarded by any of the Evangelists but John of sufficient importance to record." It adds that without John, "we should hardly have known that it was necessary for one to be born again." This suggests that "the text and context was meant to apply to Nicodemus particularly, and not to the world."

=== Historicity ===
Scholars of the historical Jesus, who attempt to ascertain how closely the stories of Jesus match the historical events they are based on, generally treat Jesus's conversation with Nicodemus in John 3 with skepticism. It details what is presumably a private conversation between Jesus and Nicodemus, with none of the disciples seemingly attending, making it unclear how a record of this conversation was acquired. In addition, the conversation is recorded in no other ancient Christian source other than John and works based on John. According to Bart Ehrman, the larger issue is that the same problem English translations of the Bible have with the Greek ἄνωθεν (ánōtʰen) is a problem in the Aramaic language as well: there is no single word in Aramaic that means both 'again' and 'from above', yet the conversation rests on Nicodemus making this misunderstanding. As the conversation was between two Jews in Jerusalem, where Aramaic was the native language, there is no reason to think that they would have spoken in Greek. This implies that even if based on a real conversation, the author of John heavily modified it to include Greek wordplay and idiom.

"Personal relationship with Jesus" was essentially unheard of, prior to 1960.

== Denominational positions ==
=== Anabaptism ===
Anabaptist denominations, such as the Mennonites, teach that "true faith entails a new birth, a spiritual regeneration by God's grace and power; 'believers' are those who have become the spiritual children of God." In Anabaptist theology, the pathway to salvation is "marked not by a forensic understanding of salvation by 'faith alone,' but by the entire process of repentance, self-denial, faith rebirth, and obedience." Those who wish to "tarry this path" are baptized after the new birth.

=== Anglicanism ===
The phrase "born again" is mentioned in the 39 Articles of the Anglican Church in article 15, entitled "Of Christ alone without Sin". In part, it reads, "sin, as S. John saith, was not in Him. But all we the rest, although baptized and born again in Christ, yet offend in many things: and if we say we have no sin, we deceive ourselves, and the truth is not in us."

Although the phrase "baptized and born again in Christ" occurs in article 15, the reference is clearly to John 3:3.

The Baptism Office of the 1662 Book of Common Prayer directly connects baptism with new birth, affirming a baptismal regeneration view of the meaning of the phrase "born again", not a conversion experience.

Before the baptism, the prayers include: "None can enter into the kingdom of God, except he be regenerate and born anew of Water and of the Holy Ghost; I beseech you to call upon God the Father, through our Lord Jesus Christ, that of his bounteous goodness he will grant to these persons that which by nature they cannot have; that they may be baptized with Water and the Holy Ghost, and received into Christ's holy Church, and be made lively members of the same."

And: "Beloved, ye hear in this Gospel the express words of our Saviour Christ, that except a man be born of water and of the Spirit, he cannot enter into the kingdom of God. Whereby ye may perceive the great necessity of this Sacrament, where it may be had."

And after baptism: "yield thee humble thanks, O heavenly Father, that thou hast vouchsafed to call us to the knowledge of thy grace, and faith in thee; Increase this knowledge, and confirm this faith in us evermore. Give thy Holy Spirit to these persons; that, being now born again, and made heirs of everlasting salvation, through our Lord Jesus Christ, they may continue thy servants, and attain thy promises; through the same Lord Jesus Christ thy Son, who liveth and reigneth with thee, in the unity of the same Holy Spirit, everlastingly. Amen."

=== Baptists ===
Baptists teach that people are born again when they start believing that Jesus "died for their sins", was buried, and rose again and that by believing/trusting in Jesus' death, burial, and resurrection, eternal life shall be granted as a gift by God. Those who have been born again, according to Baptist teaching, know that they are "[children] of God because the Holy Spirit witnesses to them that they are" (cf. assurance).

=== Roman Catholicism ===
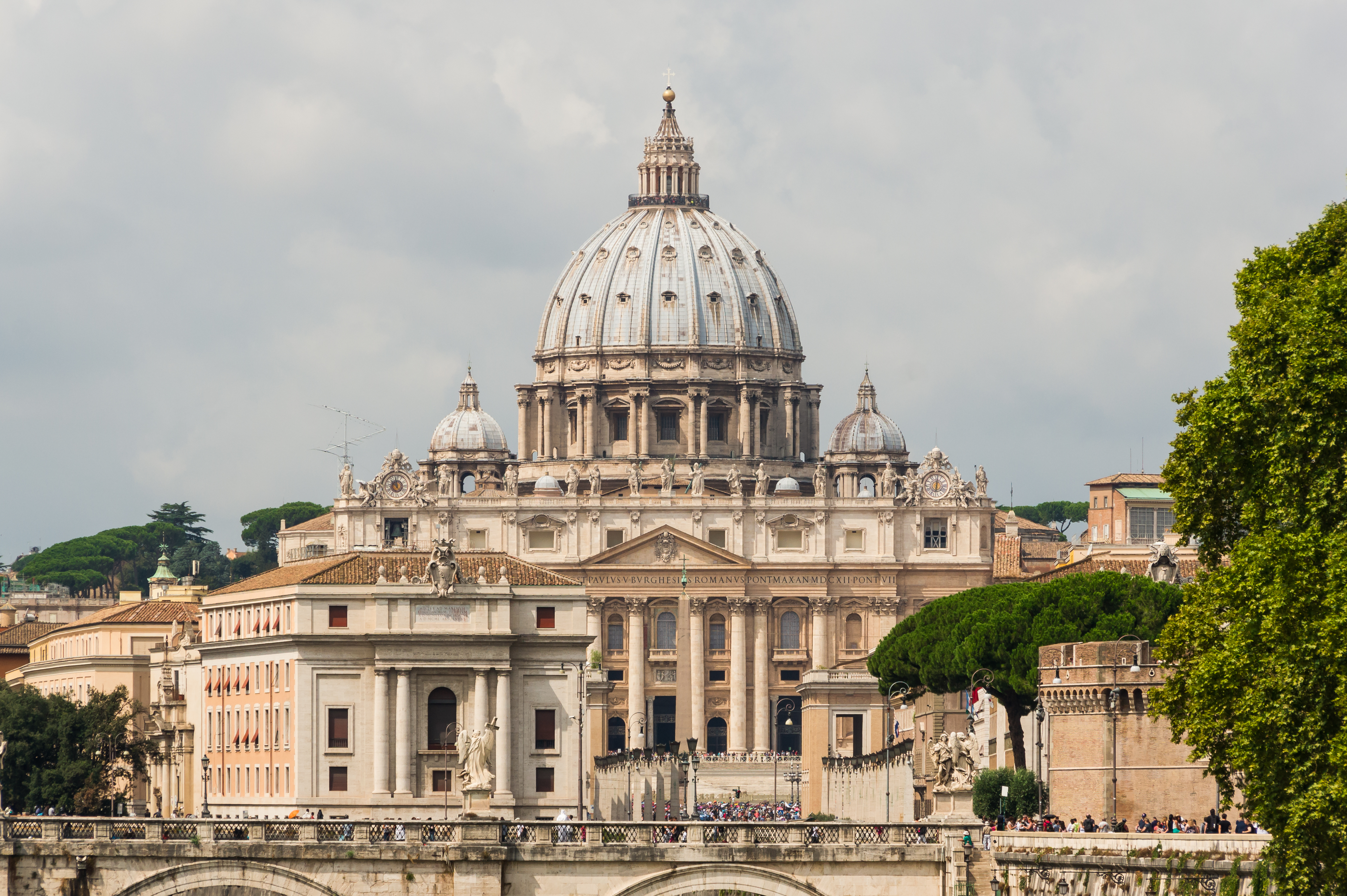
Saint Peter's Basilica façade, Rome, Italy

Historically, the classic text from John 3 was consistently interpreted by early Church Fathers as a reference to baptism. Modern Catholic interpreters have noted that the phrase 'born from above' or 'born again' is clarified as 'being born of water and Spirit'.

Catholic commentator John F. McHugh notes, "Rebirth, and the commencement of this new life, are said to come about ἐξ ὕδατος καὶ πνεύματος, of water and spirit. This phrase (without the article) refers to a rebirth which the early Church regarded as taking place through baptism."

The Catechism of the Catholic Church (CCC) notes that the essential elements of Christian initiation are: "proclamation of the Word, acceptance of the Gospel entailing conversion, profession of faith, Baptism itself, and the outpouring of the Holy Spirit, and admission to Eucharistic communion." Baptism gives the person the grace of forgiveness for all prior sins; it makes the newly baptized person a new creature and an adopted child of God; it incorporates them into the Body of Christ and creates a sacramental bond of unity leaving an indelible mark on the person's soul. "Incorporated into Christ by Baptism, the person baptized is configured to Christ. Baptism seals the Christian with the indelible spiritual mark (character) of his belonging to Christ. No sin can erase this mark, even if sin prevents Baptism from bearing the fruits of salvation. Given once for all, Baptism cannot be repeated." The Holy Spirit is involved with each aspect of the movement of grace. "The first work of the grace of the Holy Spirit is conversion. [...] Moved by grace, man turns toward God and away from sin, thus accepting forgiveness and righteousness from on high."

The Catholic Church also teaches that under special circumstances, the need for water baptism can be superseded by the Holy Spirit in a 'Baptism of desire', such as when catechumens die or are martyred before Baptism.

Pope John Paul II wrote in Catechesi Tradendae about "the problem of children baptized in infancy [who] come for catechesis in the parish without receiving any other initiation into the faith and still without any explicit personal attachment to Jesus Christ." He noted that "being a Christian means saying 'yes' to Jesus Christ, but let us remember that this 'yes' has two levels: It consists of surrendering to the word of God and relying on it, but it also means, at a later stage, endeavoring to know better—and better the profound meaning of this word."

The modern expression "born again" refers to "conversion."

The National Directory of Catechesis (published by the United States Conference of Catholic Bishops, USCCB) defines conversion as "the acceptance of a personal relationship with Christ, a sincere adherence to him, and a willingness to conform one's life to his." To put it more simply, "Conversion to Christ involves making a genuine commitment to him and a personal decision to follow him as his disciple."

Echoing the writings of Pope John Paul II, the National Directory of Catechesis describes a new intervention required by the modern world called the "New Evangelization". This is directed to the Church, to the baptized who were never effectively evangelized before, to those who have never made a personal commitment to Christ and the Gospel, to those formed by the values of secular culture, to those who have lost a sense of faith, and to those who are alienated.

Declan O'Sullivan, co-founder of the Catholic Men's Fellowship and knight of the Sovereign Military Order of Malta, wrote that the "New Evangelization emphasizes the personal encounter with Jesus Christ as a pre-condition for spreading the gospel. The born-again experience is not just an emotional, mystical high; the really important matter is what happened in the convert's life after the moment or period of radical change."

=== Jehovah's Witnesses ===
Jehovah's Witnesses believe that individuals do not have the power to choose to be born again, but that God calls and selects his followers "from above". Only those belonging to the "144,000" are considered to be born again.

=== Lutheranism ===
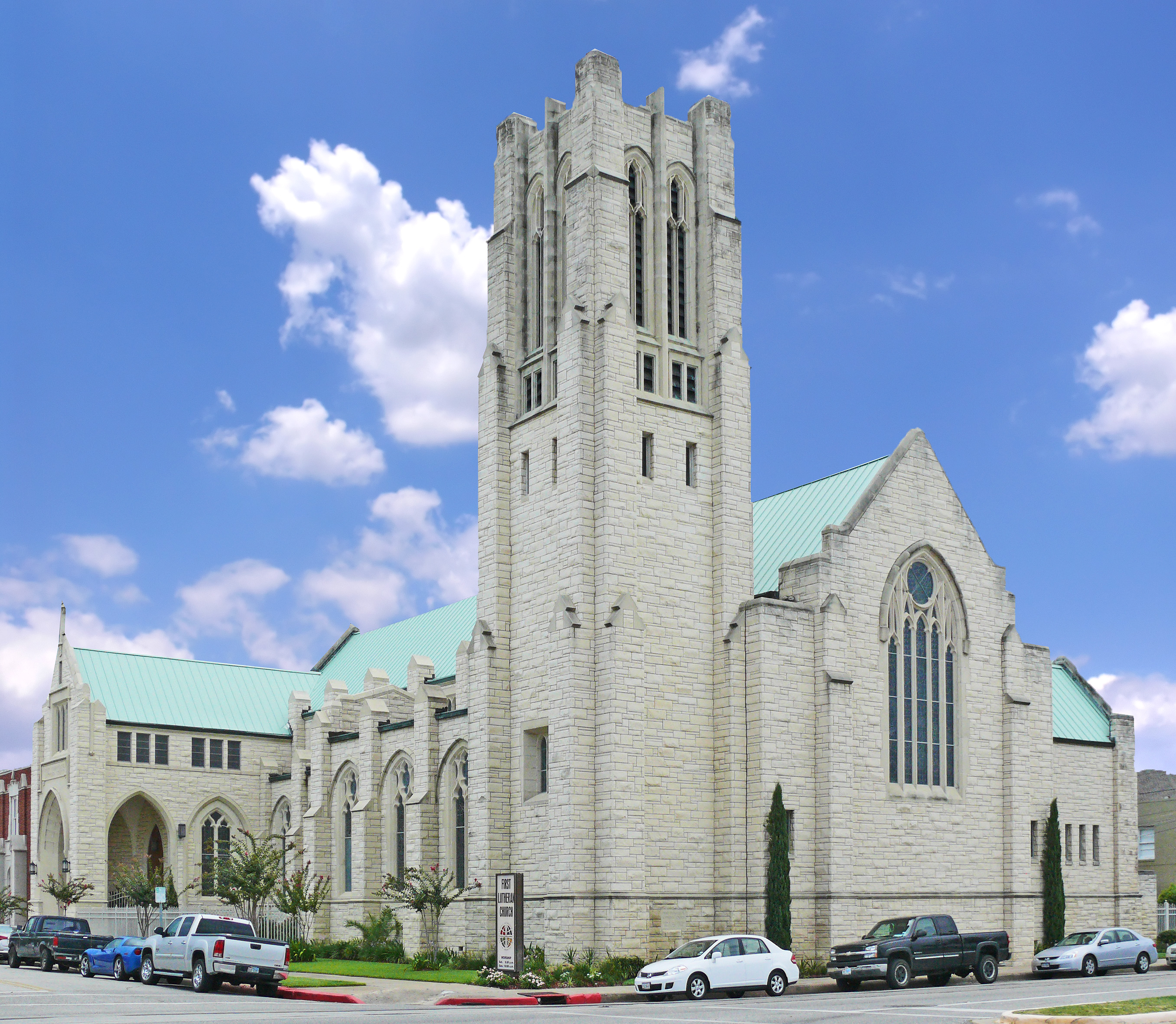
First Evangelical Lutheran Church, Galveston, Texas. Church founded in 1850 in Galveston by German immigrants as First German Evangelical Lutheran Church. Image shows second building built in 1957, which is in current use by congregation. Building not listed on National Register

Lutheranism holds that "we are cleansed of our sins and born again and renewed in Holy Baptism by the Holy Ghost. But some Lutherans also teach that whoever is baptized must, through daily contrition and repentance, drown The Old Adam so that daily, a new man comes forth and arises who walks before God in righteousness and purity forever. She teaches that whoever lives in sins after his baptism has again lost the grace of baptism."

=== Moravianism ===
About the new birth, the Moravian Church holds that a personal conversion to Christianity is a joyful experience in which the individual "accepts Christ as Lord," after which faith "daily grows inside the person." For Moravians, "Christ lived as a man because he wanted to provide a blueprint for future generations," and "a converted person could attempt to live in his image and daily become more like Jesus." As such, "heart religion" characterizes Moravian Christianity. The Moravian Church has historically emphasized evangelism, especially missionary work, to spread the faith.

=== Methodism ===
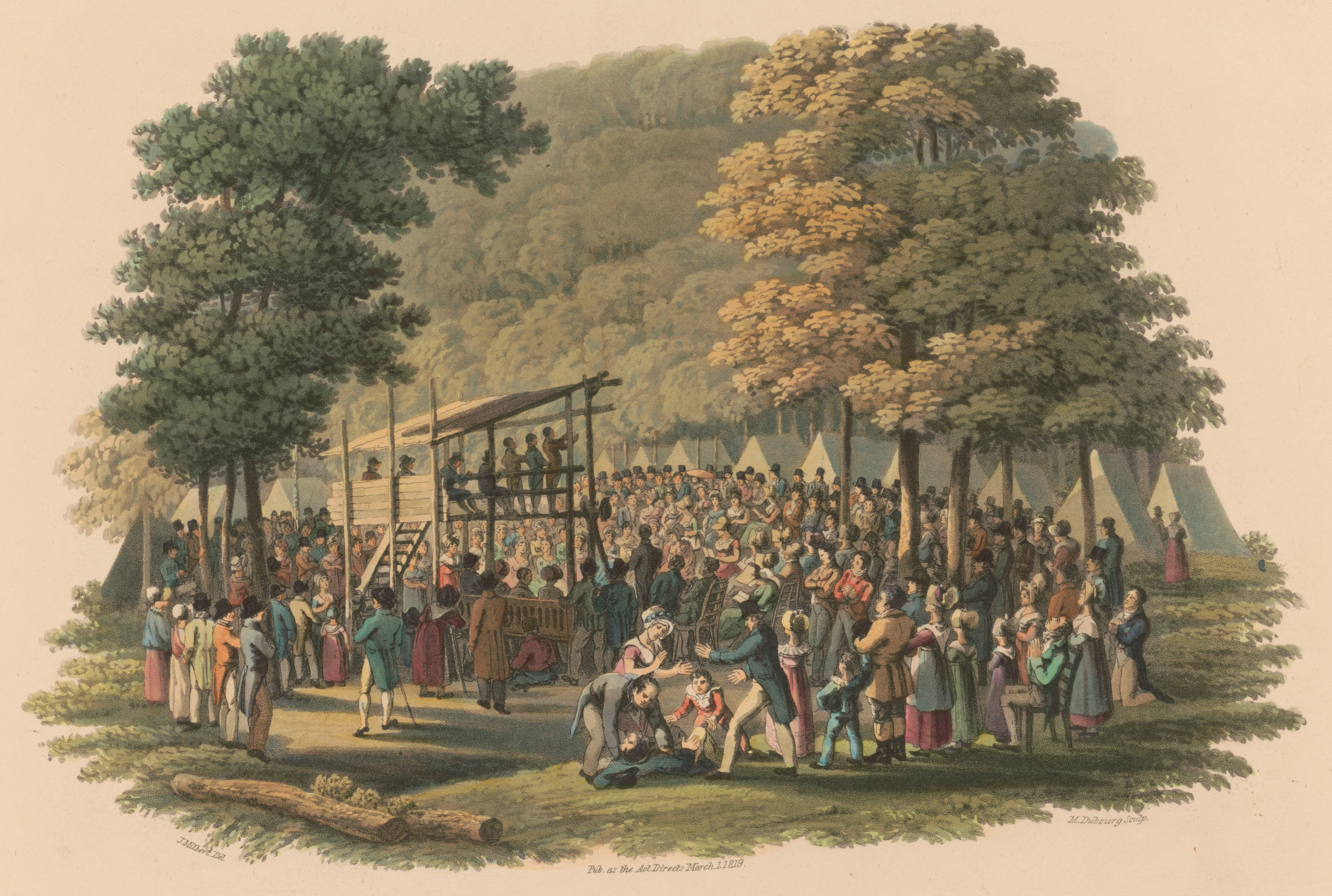
Methodist preachers are known for promulgating the doctrines of the new birth and entire sanctification to the public at events such as tent revivals and camp meetings, which they believe is the reason that God raised them up into existence.

In Methodism, the "new birth is necessary for salvation because it marks the move toward holiness. That comes with faith." John Wesley held that the New Birth "is that great change which God works in the soul when he brings it into life, when he raises it from the death of sin to the life of righteousness." In the life of a Christian, the new birth is considered the first work of grace. In keeping with Wesleyan-Arminian covenant theology, the Articles of Religion, in Article XVII – Of Baptism, state that baptism is a "sign of regeneration or the new birth." The Methodist Visitor in describing this doctrine admonishes individuals: "'Ye must be born again.' Yield to God that He may perform this work in and for you. Admit Him to your heart. 'Believe on the Lord Jesus Christ, and thou shalt be saved.'" Methodist theology teaches that the new birth contains two phases that occur together, justification and regeneration:

Though these two phases of the new birth occur simultaneously, they are, in fact, two separate and distinct acts. Justification is that gracious and judicial act of God whereby a soul is granted complete absolution from all guilt and a full release from the penalty of sin (Romans 3:23–25). This act of divine grace is wrought by faith in the merits of our Lord and Saviour Jesus Christ (Romans 5:1). Regeneration is the impartation of divine life which is manifested in that radical change in the moral character of man, from the love and life of sin to the love of God and the life of righteousness (2 Corinthians 5:17; 1 Peter 1:23). —Principles of Faith, Emmanuel Association of Churches

At the moment a person experiences the New Birth, they are "adopted into the family of God".

=== Plymouth Brethren ===
The Plymouth Brethren teach that the new birth affects salvation and those who testify that they have been born again, repented, and have faith in the Scriptures are given the right hand of fellowship, after which they can partake of the Lord's Supper.

=== Pentecostalism ===
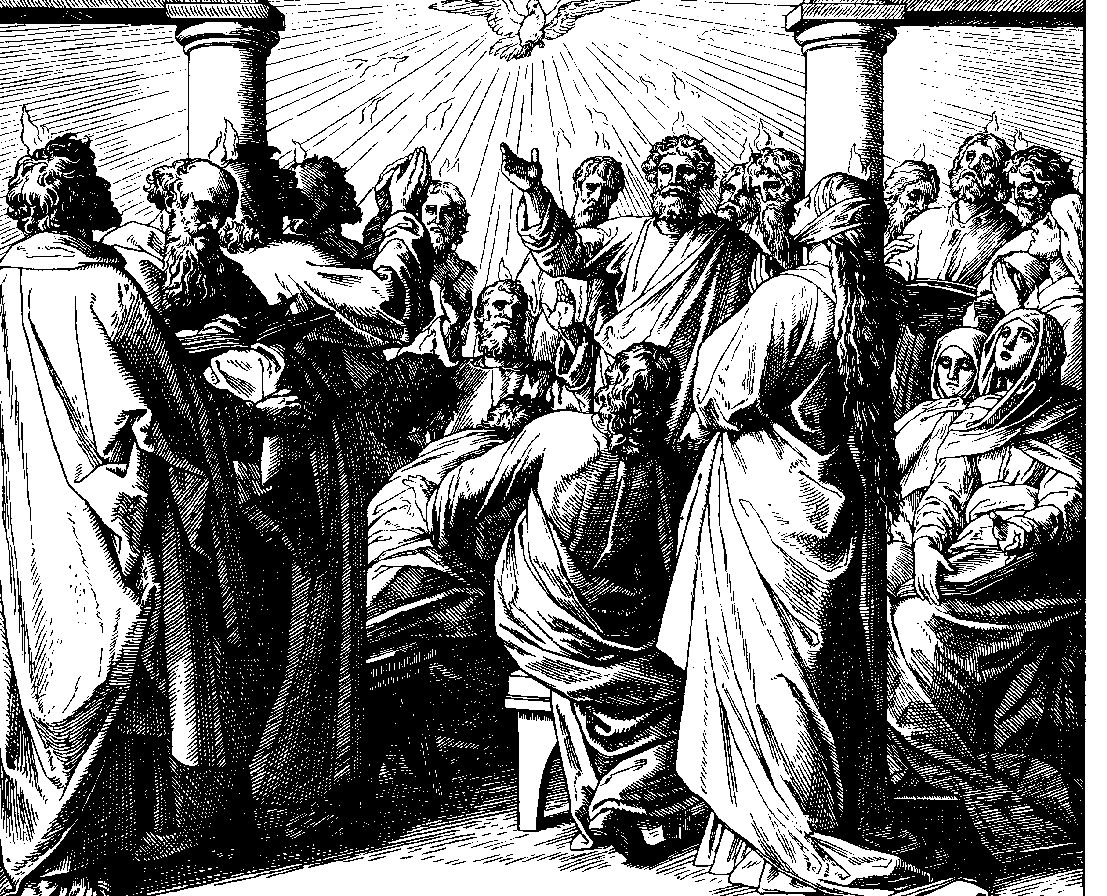
Pentecost by Julius Schnorr von Carolsfeld. Woodcut for "Die Bibel in Bildern", 1860

Holiness Pentecostals historically teach the new birth (first work of grace), entire sanctification (second work of grace) and baptism with the Holy Spirit, as evidenced by glossolalia, as the third work of grace. The new birth, according to Pentecostal teaching, imparts "spiritual life".

=== Quakerism ===
The majority of the world's Quakers are evangelical in churchmanship and teach a born-again experience (cf. Evangelical Friends Church International).

The Central Yearly Meeting of Friends, a Holiness Quaker denomination, teaches that regeneration is the "divine work of initial salvation (Tit. 3:5), or conversion, which involves the accompanying works of justification (Rom. 5:18) and adoption (Rom. 8:15, 16)." In regeneration, which occurs in the new birth, there is a "transformation in the heart of the believer wherein he finds himself a new creation in Christ (II Cor. 5:17; Col. 1:27)."

Following the new birth, George Fox taught the possibility of "holiness of heart and life through the instantaneous baptism with the Holy Spirit subsequent to the new birth" (cf. Christian perfection).

=== Reformed Christianity ===
In Reformed theology, Holy Baptism is the sign and the seal of one's regeneration, which is of comfort to the believer. The time of one's regeneration, however, is a mystery to oneself according to the Canons of Dort.

According to the Dutch Reformed Church, being born again refers to "the inward working of the Spirit which induces the sinner to respond to the effectual call". According to the Westminster Shorter Catechism, Q 88, "the outward and ordinary means whereby Christ communicateth to us the benefits of redemption are, his ordinances, especially the word, sacraments, and prayer; all of which are made effectual to the elect for salvation." Effectual calling is "the work of God's Spirit, whereby, convincing us of our sin and misery, enlightening our minds in the knowledge of Christ, and renewing our wills, he doth persuade and enable us to embrace Jesus Christ, freely offered to us in the gospel."

In Reformed theology, "regeneration precedes faith." Samuel Storms writes that, "Calvinists insist that the sole cause of regeneration or being born again is the will of God. God first sovereignly and efficaciously regenerates, and only in consequence of that do we act. Therefore, the individual is passive in regeneration, neither preparing himself nor making himself receptive to what God will do. Regeneration is a change wrought in us by God, not an autonomous act performed by us for ourselves."

=== The Church of Jesus Christ of Latter-day Saints ===
The Book of Mormon emphasizes the need for everyone to be reborn of God.

Latter-day Saints believe that being born again refers to "true repentance". In other words, rejecting the "carnal, sinful nature" of humans and making a covenant with God to live a righteous, Christ-like life. This covenant is done initially as baptism by immersion at age 8, or the age of accountability, or when someone newly converts. It is then renewed weekly through partaking of the sacrament during church meetings.

It is a common misconception that the Church of Jesus Christ teaches that these ordinances are required works to be "saved". It is actually taught that Christ has already saved all humanity from physical death and will save from spiritual death through repentance and obeying God's commandments on judgment day, after death and resurrection. Baptism and Sacrament are done as according to the faith of a person as an outward expression of an inward commitment to serve God and live a righteous life.

== Disagreements between denominations ==
The term "born again" is used by several Christian denominations, but there are disagreements on what the term means, and whether members of other denominations are justified in claiming to be born-again Christians.

Catholic Answers says Evangelical Protestants must be properly water baptized to be born again as the Bible understands it. On the other hand, reachingcatholics.org, an Evangelical site, argues that while Catholics consider themselves born again upon baptism, that is not what Jesus meant when he told Nicodemus he must be born again. According to them, the deliberate adoption of biblical terms which have different meanings for Catholics has become an effective tool in Rome's ecumenical agenda.

The Reformed view can be distinguished in at least two ways. First, classical Roman Catholicism teaches baptismal regeneration, where regeneration occurs at baptism. On the other hand, Reformed theology posits that regeneration can happen at any time, even in the womb. Second, many Evangelical branches teach that repentance and faith lead to regeneration and being born again. By contrast, Reformed theology teaches that original sin and total depravity deprive all people of the moral ability and will to exercise saving faith. Regeneration is done only by God and the Holy spirit, and people cannot act on their own to be born again.

== History and usage ==
Historically, Christianity has used various metaphors to describe its rite of initiation, that is, spiritual regeneration via the sacrament of baptism by the power of the water and the spirit. This remains the common understanding in most of Christendom, held, for example, in Roman Catholicism, Eastern Orthodoxy, Oriental Orthodoxy, Lutheranism, Anglicanism, and in other historic branches of Protestantism. However, sometime after the Reformation, Evangelicalism attributed a different significance to the expression born again as an experience of religious conversion, only symbolized by water baptism, and rather brought about by a commitment to one's own personal faith in Jesus Christ for salvation. This same belief is, historically, also an integral part of Methodist doctrine, and is connected with the doctrine of Justification.

According to Encyclopædia Britannica:

'Rebirth' has often been identified with a definite, temporally datable form of 'conversion'. ... With the voluntaristic type, rebirth is expressed in a new alignment of the will, in the liberation of new capabilities and powers that were hitherto undeveloped in the person concerned. With the intellectual type, it leads to an activation of the capabilities for understanding, to the breakthrough of a "vision". With others it leads to the discovery of an unexpected beauty in the order of nature or to the discovery of the mysterious meaning of history. With still others it leads to a new vision of the moral life and its orders, to a selfless realization of love of neighbour. ... each person affected perceives his life in Christ at any given time as "newness of life."

According to J. Gordon Melton:

Born again is a phrase used by many Protestants to describe the phenomenon of gaining faith in Jesus Christ. It is an experience when everything they have been taught as Christians becomes real, and they develop a direct and personal relationship with God.

According to Andrew Purves and Charles Partee:

Sometimes the phrase seems to be judgmental, making a distinction between genuine and nominal Christians. Sometimes ... descriptive, like the distinction between liberal and conservative Christians. Occasionally, the phrase seems historic, like the division between Catholic and Protestant Christians. ... [the term] usually includes the notion of human choice in salvation and excludes a view of divine election by grace alone.

The term born again has become widely associated with the evangelical Christian renewal since the late 1960s, first in the United States and then around the world. Associated perhaps initially with Jesus People and the Christian counterculture, born again came to refer to a conversion experience, accepting Jesus Christ as lord and savior in order to be saved from hell and given eternal life with God in heaven, and was increasingly used as a term to identify devout believers. By the mid-1970s, born again Christians were increasingly referred to in the mainstream media as part of the born again movement.

In 1976, Watergate conspirator Chuck Colson's book Born Again gained international notice. Time magazine named him "One of the 25 most influential Evangelicals in America." The term was sufficiently prevalent so that during the year's presidential campaign, Democratic party nominee Jimmy Carter described himself as "born again" in the first Playboy magazine interview of an American presidential candidate.

Colson describes his path to faith in conjunction with his criminal imprisonment and played a significant role in solidifying the "born again" identity as a cultural construct in the US. He writes that his spiritual experience followed considerable struggle and hesitancy to have a "personal encounter with God." He recalls:

while I sat alone staring at the sea I love, words I had not been certain I could understand or say fell from my lips: "Lord Jesus, I believe in You. I accept You. Please come into my life. I commit it to You." With these few words...came a sureness of mind that matched the depth of feeling in my heart. There came something more: strength and serenity, a wonderful new assurance about life, a fresh perception of myself in the world around me.

Jimmy Carter was the first President of the United States to publicly declare that he was born-again, in 1976. By the 1980 campaign, all three major candidates stated that they had been born again.

Sider and Knippers state that "Ronald Reagan's election that fall [was] aided by the votes of 61% of 'born-again' white Protestants."

The Gallup Organization reported that "In 2003, 42% of U.S. adults said they were born-again or evangelical; the 2004 percentage is 41%" and that, "Black Americans are far more likely to identify themselves as born-again or evangelical, with 63% of blacks saying they are born-again, compared with 39% of white Americans. Republicans are far more likely to say they are born-again (52%) than Democrats (36%) or independents (32%)."

The Oxford Handbook of Religion and American Politics, referring to several studies, reports "that 'born-again' identification is associated with lower support for government anti-poverty programs." It also notes that "self-reported born-again" Christianity, "strongly shapes attitudes towards economic policy."

== Names which have been inspired by the term ==
The idea of "rebirth in Christ" has inspired some common European forenames: French René/Renée, Dutch Renaat/Renate, Italian, Spanish, Portuguese and Croatian Renato/Renata, Latin Renatus/Renata, all of which mean "reborn", "born again".

The command language and shell program Bash, short for "Bourne-Again SHell", is a pun on "born again", being a mix with the name of the previous Bourne shell.

== Statistics ==
The Oxford Handbook of Religion and American Politics notes: "The GSS ... has asked a born-again question on three occasions ... 'Would you say you have been 'born again' or have had a 'born-again' experience?" The Handbook says that "Evangelical, black, and Latino Protestants tend to respond similarly, with about two-thirds of each group answering in the affirmative. In contrast, only about one third of mainline Protestants and one sixth of Catholics (Anglo and Latino) claim a born-again experience." However, the handbook suggests that "born-again questions are poor measures even for capturing evangelical respondents. ... it is likely that people who report a born-again experience also claim it as an identity."

== See also ==
- Aldersgate Day – Methodist commemorative day
- Altar call – Tradition in some Christian churches
- Baptismal regeneration – Doctrines held by major Christian denominations
- Baptism with the Holy Spirit – Term found in the New Testament
- Born-again virgin – Person who commits to abstinence after having had sexual intercourse
- Child dedication – Act of consecration of children
- Christian nationalism – Christian ideology espousing religious nationalism
- Dvija – Twice-born status of Hindu male after Upanayana
- Evangelism – Preaching the Gospel of Jesus Christ
- Jesus movement – Former evangelical Christian movement
- Monergism – View in Christian theology
- Sinner's prayer – Evangelical Christian term for any prayer of repentance
