= Bruno Lavagnini =

Italian classical philologist (1898–1992)

- Lavagnini in 1957
- Born: October 3, 1898; Siena, Tuscany, Kingdom of Italy
- Died: March 30, 1992 (aged 93); Palermo, Sicily, Italy
- Occupation: University professor

Academic background
- Education: Scuola Normale Superiore; Italian School of Archaeology at Athens; Istituto di Studi Superiori
- Thesis: Le origini del romanzo greco (1920)
- Doctoral advisor: Francesco Zambaldi
- Other advisors: Giorgio Pasquali; Luigi Pareti

Academic work
- Discipline: Classical philology
- Sub-discipline: Greek literature
- Institutions: University of Palermo

Bruno Lavagnini (3 October 1898–20 March 1992) was an Italian scholar of Greek literature and Emeritus at the University of Palermo.

== Biography ==
Bruno Lavagnini was born in a working class family in Siena, the second of the five children of Lorenzo and Assunta (née Vinci). His father was a telegraph clerk and his mother a retired schoolteacher.

After attending elementary and middle school in Viareggio, he entered the liceo classico in Lucca (1911–1916), where his teachers encouraged his interests and talent for classical antiquity.

In 1916 he was accepted at the Scuola Normale Superiore in Pisa where, despite the crisis caused by World War I (1915–1918) and some familiar shortcomings, he could study "peacefully, fruitfully and intensely for four years in then-quiet Tuscany".

Lavagnini graduated in 1920, tutored by Francesco Zambaldi (1837–1928), defending a dissertation on Le origini del romanzo greco ['The origins of Greek novel'], published the next year.

At Pisa, he attended classes by Giovanni Gentile on philosophers of the Italian Renaissance, and was advised by his professors to write and publish his first essays in Latin literature, archaeology, epigraphy, linguistics.

In 1921, Lavagnini won a scholarship at the Italian School of Archaeology at Athens, which he would consider instrumental in his academic formation.

Upon his return in Italy, he won a scholarship at the Istituto di Studi Superiori at Florence and was accepted for a "perfezionamento" at the Scuola Normale.

He obtained both degrees in the summer of 1922, defending a dissertation on Le origini del romanzo di Apuleio ['The origins of Apuleius' novel'] in Pisa, and an "improvvisato lavoro di archeologia" in Florence, since Giorgio Pasquali did not approve of his Teubner edition of the papyrus fragments of ancient Greek novels.

The death of his father Lorenzo and the lack of assistant positions in Universities forced Bruno to accept some jobs as high school teacher and to apply for habilitation in 1923.

Whilst he had the credentials to apply for a position as assistant professor in Greek and Latin at the Scuola Normale, he lost it to "a pupil of his who would become Professor in Naples ... an alumnus of the University of Padua". In 1924, he was habilitated to university teaching in Greek literature and taught Ancient Greek literature in Padua (1924/1925), Pisa (from 1925 to 1927) and Catania (1927/1928).

In 1928, Lavagnini won a tenured position at the University of Palermo where, after teaching for two years (1928–1930) in Catania, he became Professor in Greek literature.

He held the chair of Ancient Greek literature and introduced classes in Modern Greek literature, which he taught from 1930/1931 to 1966/1967, as one of the only two Italian universities with the Sapienza University to teach the subject.

Lavagnini spent research periods in Athens (1936) and Crete (1939) and, unlike many colleagues, supported Greece in the Italian invasion of 1940. He remained connected to Greece despite the (failed) campaign, and from 1952 to 1959 he chaired the Istituto Italiano di Cultura in Athens, contributing to re-establish the diplomatic relationships between the two nations.

In 1964 he was elected Fellow of the Academy of Sciences at Athens and nominated Honorary Consul of Greece but would resign from the former position after the coup d'état of 1967.

After World War II, Lavagnini also intensified his interest for Byzantine literature as "the natural antecedent of modern Greek culture": he chaired the eighth International Congress of Byzantine Studies (Palermo, 3–10 April 1951) and founded the Istituto Siciliano di Studi Bizantini e Neoellenici [ISSN] (in 1952). In 1963 he was elected President of the Associazione Italiana di Studi Bizantini [AISB] and made correspondent of the Accademia dei Lincei (elevated to Fellow in 1972).

In Palermo, he served as director of the Faculty library (1933–1948) and Dean of the Faculty of Humanities (1965–1973), where he created the Institute of Greek philology.

Lavagnini retired from teaching in 1968 and from all academic positions in 1975, and was nominated Emeritus Professor at the University of Palermo. He remained scholarly productive since his very last days and died in Palermo in 1992. He had married a pupil of his, Orsola Autore, on 2 September 1939 and the couple had two daughters, Marina and Renata Lavagnini, the latter of whom also taught Modern Greek literature and Medieval Greek philology at the University of Palermo.

== Research activity ==
Lavagnini developed and published almost five hundred works over the course of nearly seventy years of scholarly activity. His main area of research was Greek literature as a whole (classical, medieval and modern) with special interest for poetry and narrative prose, but he also wrote on archaeology, linguistics and toponymy.

At the beginning of his career, Lavagnini was chiefly a classical philologist, publishing his first scholarly works whilst still an undergraduate at Pisa. In 1922 he published both an extensive study of Greek novel, derived from his dissertation, and the Teubner edition of all extant fragments of Greek novels. Through the 1920s he would also publish works in Greek and Latin epigraphy and archaeology. In his first years of teaching in Palermo, Lavagnini published monographs based on the lecture notes of his classes, which show a predominant interest for Greek poetry of the archaic, classical, and Hellenistic ages.

Whilst predominantly a scholar of Greek literature, Lavagnini also gave scholarly contributions to Latin literature, both of the classical age and of the Renaissance. Most notable are his 1922 dissertation on the Metamorphoses by Apuleius; critical essays on various poets (Plautus, Ovid, Horace, Vergil, Lucretius, Juvenal, and others); and the critical edition of the satura sotadea attributed to Luisa Sigea de Velasco, but which Lavagnini attributed to Nicolas Chorier. He was interested in the history of classical philology and assigned dissertations on various philologists, including for instance his late tutor Zambaldi.

Several of his studies in Greek literature, from classical antiquity to Byzantium, were collected in a volume published in 1978, which included an "Autobiography".

== Publications ==
- Lavagnini, B. (1917–1918). "Un codicetto lucchese delle χρυσᾶ ἔπη". Bollettino di Filologia Classica. 24: 169–172.
- Lavagnini, B. (1921a). "Integrazioni e congetture a frammenti di romanzi greci". Aegyptus. 2 (2): 200–206. JSTOR 41213599.
- Lavagnini, B. (1921b). "Un frammento di un nuovo romanzo greco di Troia?". Aegyptus. 2 (2): 192–199. JSTOR 41213598.
- Lavagnini, B. (1922). "Le origini del romanzo greco". ASNP. 28: 1–104. JSTOR 45452006.
- Lavagnini, B., ed. (1922). Eroticorum Graecorum fragmenta papyracea. Leipzig: Teubner.
- Lavagnini, B. (1925). Saggio sullo svolgimento della storiografia greca. Padova: Tipografia del Seminario.
- Lavagnini, B. (1927). "Il significato e il valore del romanzo di Apuleio". ASNP. 29: 1–40. JSTOR 45451692.
- Lavagnini, B. (1928). "La patria di Senofonte Efesio". Annali delle Università Toscane. N. S. 10: 239–249.
- Lavagnini, B. (1932a). "Prolegomeni a una nuova edizione di Aloisia Sigea". ASNP. N. S. 1 (4): 325–334. JSTOR 24298272.
- Lavagnini, B. (1932b). Pindaro. Lezioni di letteratura greca, anno accademico 1931-32. Vol. I–III. Palermo: Edizioni del GUF.
- Lavagnini, B. (1933a). Euripide, «Eracle». Lezioni di letteratura greca, anno accademico 1932-33. Palermo: Edizioni del GUF.
- Lavagnini, B. (1933b). Saggio sulla storiografia ellenistica. Bari: Laterza.
- Lavagnini, B. (1934). Euripide, «Eracle» (continuazione). Lezioni di letteratura greca, anno accademico 1933-34. Palermo: Edizioni del GUF.
- Lavagnini, B. (1935a). L'Idillio secondo di Teocrito. Palermo: Trimarchi.
- Lavagnini, B. (1935b). Teocrito, Eronda. Lezioni di letteratura greca, anno accademico 1934-35. Palermo: Edizioni del GUF.
- Lavagnini, B., ed. (1935). Aloisiae Sigeae Toletanae Satyra sotadica de arcanis Amoris et Veneris. Catania: Prampolini.
- Lavagnini, B. (1936). Bacchilide. Lezioni di letteratura greca, anno accademico 1935-36. Palermo: Edizioni del GUF.
- Lavagnini, B. (1939). Lo «Ione» di Euripide. Lezioni di letteratura greca, anno accademico 1938-39. Palermo: Edizioni del GUF.
- Lavagnini, B. (1942a). Alle fonti della «Pisanella», ovvero, d'Annunzio e la Grecia moderna. Palermo: Palumbo.
- Lavagnini, B. (1942b). "Sulla località "Panormos" menzionata nel Digenis Akritas (1, 101). Con una postilla sul nome della città di Palermo". Atti dell'Accademia di Palermo. S. IV. 3: 389–394.
- Lavagnini, B. (1946). Avviamento alla glottologia. Palermo: Palumbo.
- Lavagnini, B. (1950). Da Mimnermo a Callimaco, Contributi esegetici e critici ai lirici greci. Turin: Paravia.
- Lavagnini, B. (1951). Studi sul romanzo greco. Messina – Firenze: D'Anna.
- Lavagnini, B. (1954). Trittico neogreco. Porfiras, Kavafis, Sikelianos. Athens: Istituto Italiano di Cultura.
- Lavagnini, B. (1955). Storia della letteratura neoellenica. Milan: Nuova Accademia.
- Lavagnini, B. (1957). Arodafnùsa. 32 poeti neogreci (1880–1940). Athens: Istituto Italiano di Cultura.
- Lavagnini, B. (1960). Storia della letteratura neoellenica (2nd ed.). Milan: Nuova Accademia.
- Lavagnini, B. (1962). Ausonia. Ἀνθολογία τῆς συγκρονῆς ἰταλικῆς ποιήσεως (1900–1950). Athens: Istituto Italiano di Cultura.
- Lavagnini, B. (1966). Belisario in Italia. Storia di un anno. Palermo: Mori.
- Lavagnini, B. (1978). Ἄτακτα. Scritti minori di letteratura greca, bizantina, neogreca. Palermo: Palumbo.
- Lavagnini, B. (1981). Alle origini del verso politico. Quaderni, 11. Palermo: Istituto Siciliano di Studi Bizantini e Neoellenici.
- Lavagnini, B. (1984). "Il problema del romanzo greco". In Gärtner, H. (ed.). Beiträge zum griechischen Liebesroman. Hildesheim: Olms. pp. 68–101.
- Lavagnini, B. (1985). "Ancora sul romanzo greco". ASNP. S. III. 15 (1): 69–80. JSTOR 24307070.
- Lavagnini, B. (1987). "L'epigramma e il committente". DOP. 41: 339–350. doi:10.2307/1291571. JSTOR 1291571.
- Degani, E. (1991). "Un ricordo di Francesco Zambaldi". Eikasmos. 2: 251–256 – via UniBo.
- Tsatsos, I. (1980). Poesie scelte. Quaderni di poesia neogreca, 5. Translated by Lavagnini, B. Palermo: Istituto Siciliano di Studi Bizantini e Neoellenici.
- Sikelianos, A. (1987). Vita Lirica. Poesie scelte e scene della tragedia «Digenis». Quaderni di poesia neogreca, 6. Translated by Lavagnini, B. Palermo: Istituto Siciliano di Studi Bizantini e Neoellenici.

== Fellowships and honors ==
- Academy of Sciences, Athens, Foreign Fellow (1964)
- Accademia Nazionale dei Lincei, Correspondent (29 August 1963); Fellow (26 September 1972)
- Accademia Nazionale di Scienze, Lettere e Arti, Palermo (1936)
- Associazione Italiana di Studi Bizantini (President 1963–1972)
- Austrian Academy of Sciences, Foreign Fellow (1974)
- Honorary Consul, Republic of Greece (1964–1967; voluntary resignation)
- Honorary Degree, Aristotle University of Thessaloniki
- Honorary Degree, University of Athens (1931)
- Istituto Italiano di Cultura at Athens, President (1952–1959)

=== Festschriften ===
- Grégoire, H., ed. (1963). Hommage a Bruno Lavagnini. Byzantion, 33.1. Bruxelles: Fondation Byzantine. JSTOR i40174173.
- D'Ippolito, G.; Nicosia, S.; Rotolo, V., eds. (1995). Giornate di studio sull’opera di Bruno Lavagnini. Palermo, 7–8 maggio 1993. Atti. Quaderni dell’Istituto di Filologia greca dell’Università di Palermo, 22. Palermo: Università.
- Rotolo, V., ed. (2000). Byzantino-Sicula III. Miscellanea di scritti in memoria di Bruno Lavagnini. Quaderni, 14. Palermo: Istituto Siciliano di Studi Bizantini e Neoellenici.

== Bibliography ==
- Degani, E. (1992). "Ricordo di Bruno Lavagnini". Eikasmos. 3: 307–322 – via UniBo.
- Lavagnini, B. (1978). "Autobiografia". Ἄτακτα. Scritti minori di letteratura greca, bizantina, neogreca. Palermo: Palumbo. pp. VII–XXV.
- Montuschi, Cl. (2005). "Lavagnini, Bruno". Dizionario Biografico degli Italiani. Vol. 64. Rome: Istituto della Enciclopedia Italiana.
- Pertusi, A. (1963). "Bruno Lavagnini". Byzantion. 33 (1): VII–XII. JSTOR 44169066.
- Pintacuda, M. (2024-04-10). "Ricordo di Bruno Lavagnini". pintacuda.it.
- Ridolfo, M. R. (1970–1971). La vita e l'opera di Francesco Zambaldi. Vol. I–II. Tesi di Laurea, relatore B. Lavagnini. Palermo: Università di Palermo.
- Rossi Taibbi, G. (1963). "Bibliografia di Bruno Lavagnini". Byzantion. 33 (1): XIII–XLVI. JSTOR 44169067.
