= Philip Johan von Strahlenberg =

Swedish geographer and cartographer (1676–1747)

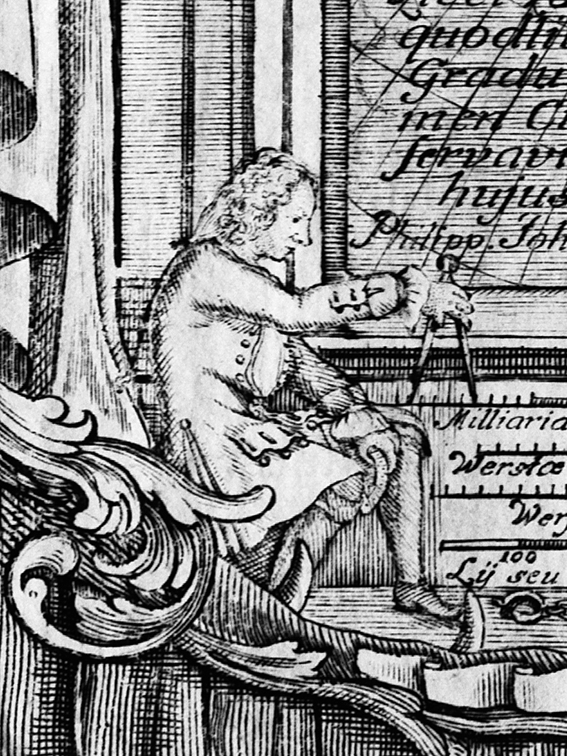
- Self-portrait on map
- Born: Philip Johan Tabbert; 1676; Stralsund, Swedish Pomerania
- Died: 1747 (aged 70–71); Halmstad, Sweden
- Military career
- Allegiance: Sweden
- Branch: Infantry
- Service years: 1694–1746
- Rank: Major
- Conflicts: Great Northern War; Battle of Fraustadt; Battle of Holowczyn; Battle of Poltava
- Awards: Raised to nobility in 1707
- Other work: Cartographer

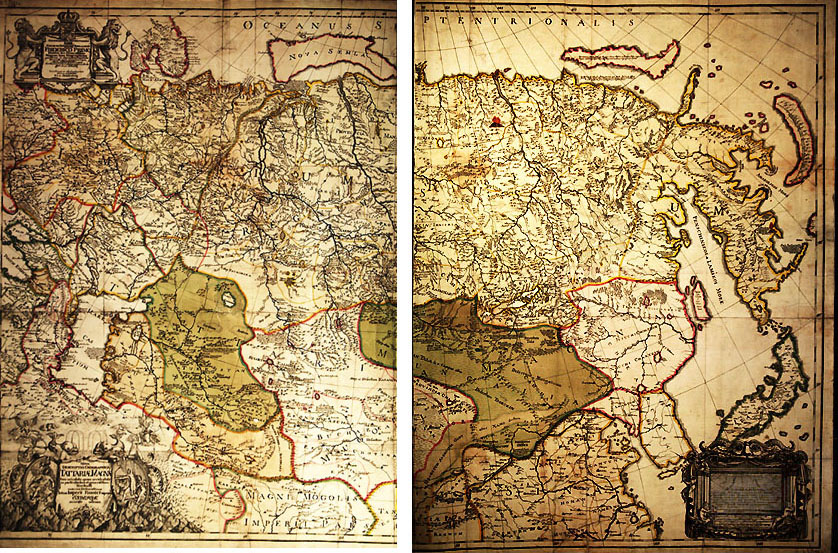
Map of Russia in 1725, drawn by Philip Johan von Strahlenberg and Johan Anton von Matern

Philip Johan von Strahlenberg (1676–1747) was a Swedish officer and geographer of German origin who made important contributions to the cartography of Russia.

== Life ==
Strahlenberg was born in Stralsund, which then belonged to Sweden, and his original name was Philip Johan Tabbert. He joined the Swedish army in 1694 and was promoted captain in 1703. In 1707, he was ennobled and took the name von Strahlenberg.

Taking part in the Great Northern War, he was captured by the victorious Russian forces during the Battle of Poltava in 1709. As a prisoner of war, he was sent to Tobolsk, where he lived from 1711 to 1721. During this time, he studied the geography of Siberia and the anthropology, languages and customs of its native tribes. After returning to Stockholm in 1730, he published his book Das Nord- und Ostliche Theil von Europa und Asia (North and Eastern Parts of Europe and Asia) with the results of his studies. The book was well received and soon translated into English, French and Spanish.

As part of his book, Strahlenberg and Johan Anton von Matérn drew new maps of all of Russia – a formidable task in itself. He also suggested a new border between the continents of Europe and Asia in Russian territory. This border follows the peaks of the Ural Mountains, then branches off westwards along a minor mountain range, follows the hilly west bank of the Volga River downstream to the 49th degree of latitude and the Don River thereon to the Black Sea. Vasily Tatischev claimed that it was at his suggestion that Strahlenberg adopted the idea.

Strahlenberg's book also extensively deals with the languages and customs of the Tatars, Yakuts, Chuvash, Crimean Tatars, Uzbeks, Bashkirs, Kyrgyz, Turkmen Tatars and Mongols. He also compiled and published a Kalmyk-German dictionary, subsequently issued with French and English translations. In writing about the shamanic rituals of the indigenous peoples of Siberia, he noted their use of the fly agaric mushroom (Amanita muscaria).

In his later years, Strahlenberg wrote an extensive two-volume treatise on the history of Russia, which was published in French translation as Description Historique de l'Empire Russien (Historical Description of the Russian Empire) in 1757.

The asteroid (15766) Strahlenberg is named after him.

== Von Strahlenberg's line ==
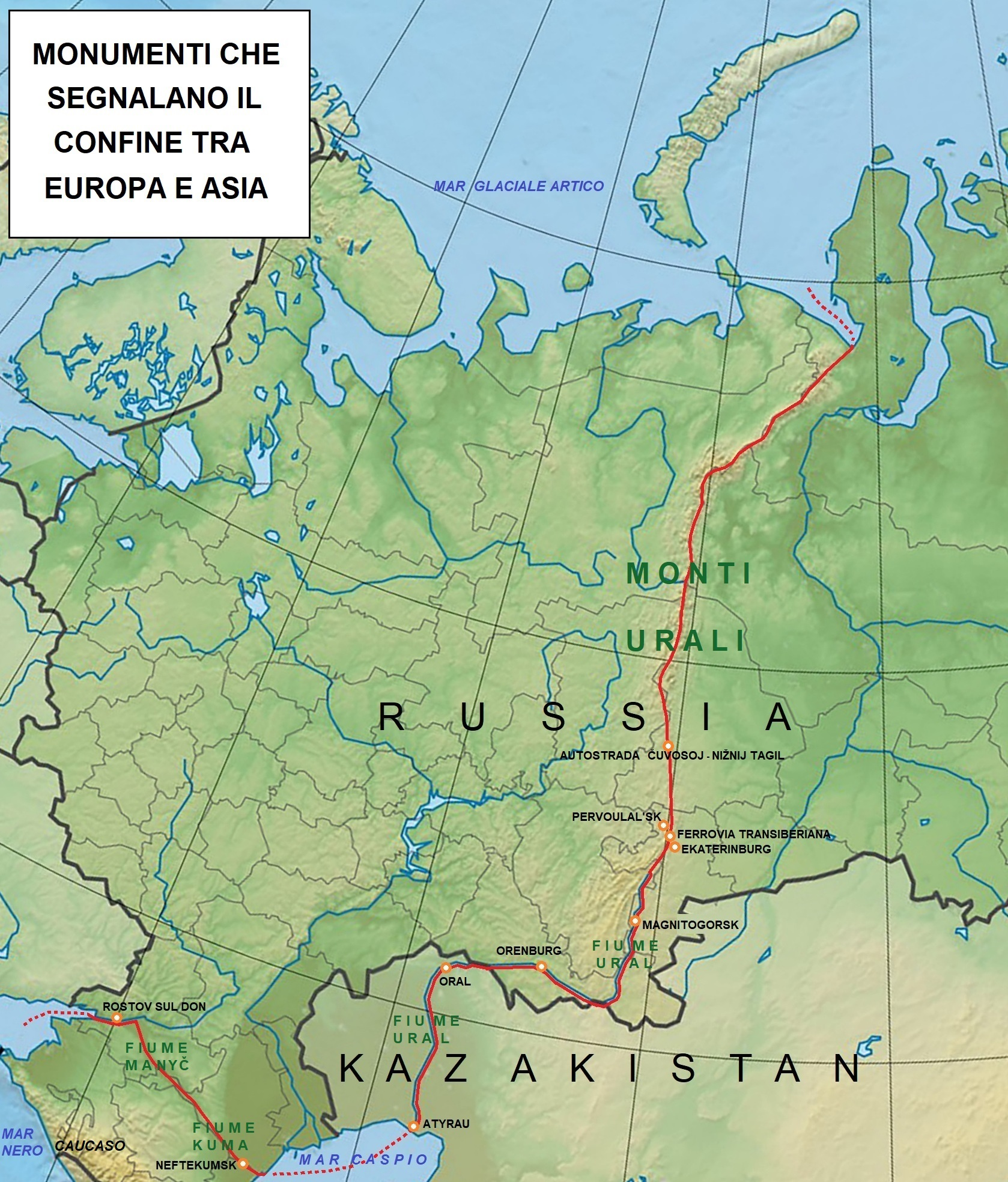
Monuments on the boundary between Europe and Asia according to von Strahlenberg's line overhauled in 1958

Von Strahlenberg, based on his studies, proposed a demarcation line between the European and Asian continents that starts from the Arctic Ocean, including Novaya Zemlya and the Yugorsky Peninsula in Europe, runs along the Ural Mountains, then follows the Emba River to the coasts of the Caspian Sea and finally crosses the Kuma–Manych Depression, ending in the Sea of Azov.

Today, the Ural River, and not the Emba, is usually used as the border between the two continents.

The geographer of Peter the Great, Vasily Tatishchev, had a notable role in the choice of the Eurasian border line, giving it a historical-naturalistic justification. Strahlenberg and Tatishchev had met in 1720 in Tobolsk, and collaborated intensely, so much so that it is thought that the Russian's ideas influenced Strahlenberg's proposals.

Russian intellectuals and statesmen were enthusiastic about the line proposed by von Strahlenberg, which was understandable given the ideals of Westernization that were increasingly spreading in Russia in the first half of the 18th century, due to the policies of Peter the Great. The previous conventional line in fact placed the border between Europe and Asia along the course of the Don River, in the heart of Russia, and this was now considered unacceptable. Strahlenberg's line triumphed not only in Russia, but also in the rest of Europe. In 1730, this continental border was officially approved by Anna of Russia and validated by the biologist Peter Simon Pallas and the geographer Carl Ritter, based on their geological research, botanical and faunal.

In 1958, the Geographical Society of the Soviet Union (now known as the Russian Geographical Society) revised the Strahlenberg line by modifying the stretch from the Urals to the Caspian Sea and adopted it as the border between Europe and Asia for school textbooks. Even today, von Strahlenberg's line overhauled in 1958 and with the replacement of the Emba river with Ural river, is followed in the geographical literature of many countries.

The convention that places a stretch of the Eurasian border along the Kuma–Manych Depression, although it is still followed, is not universally accepted: some geographers, especially those from the United States and those who follow their criteria, prefer to follow the Greater Caucasus watershed rather than the course of the two rivers, so as to make the continental border coincides with the political borders of Russia.

=== Monuments marking the Europe-Asia border on von Strahlenberg's line ===
Starting from the first half of the nineteenth century, about a hundred monuments were installed on the conventional Europe-Asia border based on von Strahlenberg's line, modified with the substitution of the Ural river in place of the Emba river. The first was that of Pervouralsk, built in 1837 on Mount Berezovaja, about which the famous writer Dostoevsky also wrote. The most notable are the following.

- On the Ural Mountains watershed: Yekaterinburg, Pervouralsk, Berezovaya Mountain, Chusovoy highway - Nizhny Tagil, Trans-Siberian Railway.
- On the Ural River: Orenburg, Magnitogorsk, Atyrau, Oral (Uralsk).
- On the Kuma-Manych Depression: Rostov-on-Don, Neftekumsk (in this case, the Europe-Asia stele is depicted in the coat of arms of the city).
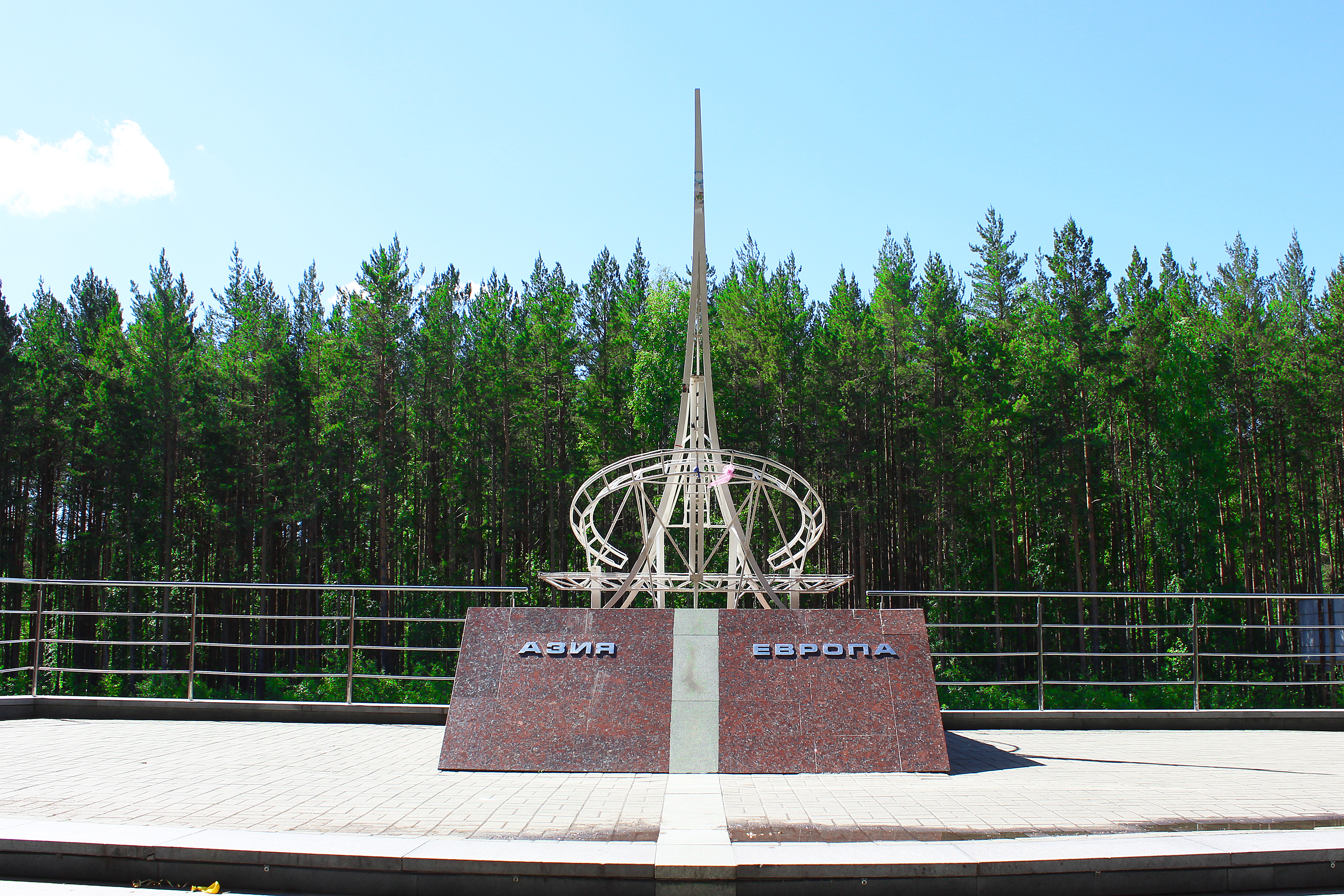
Yekaterinburg, Russia - 2004. At the base there are stones coming from Cabo da Roca, the westernmost point of Europe and from Cape Dezhnyov, the easternmost point of Asia. In the city of Yekaterinburg the Europe-Asia border is also remembered by a relief placed on the facade of the railway station

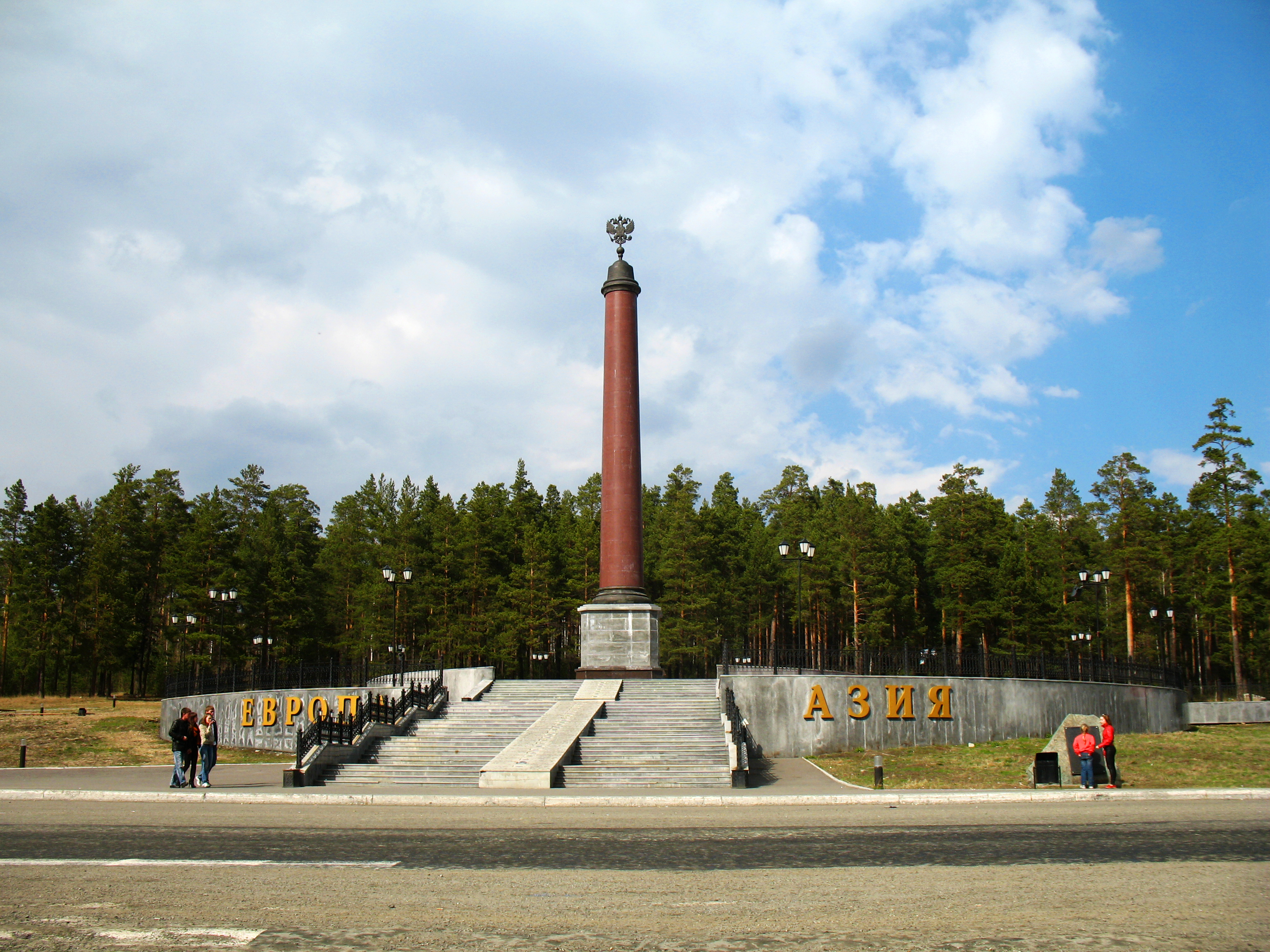
Mount Berezovaja (56°52'13.0"N 60°02'52.0"E), Russia - 2008

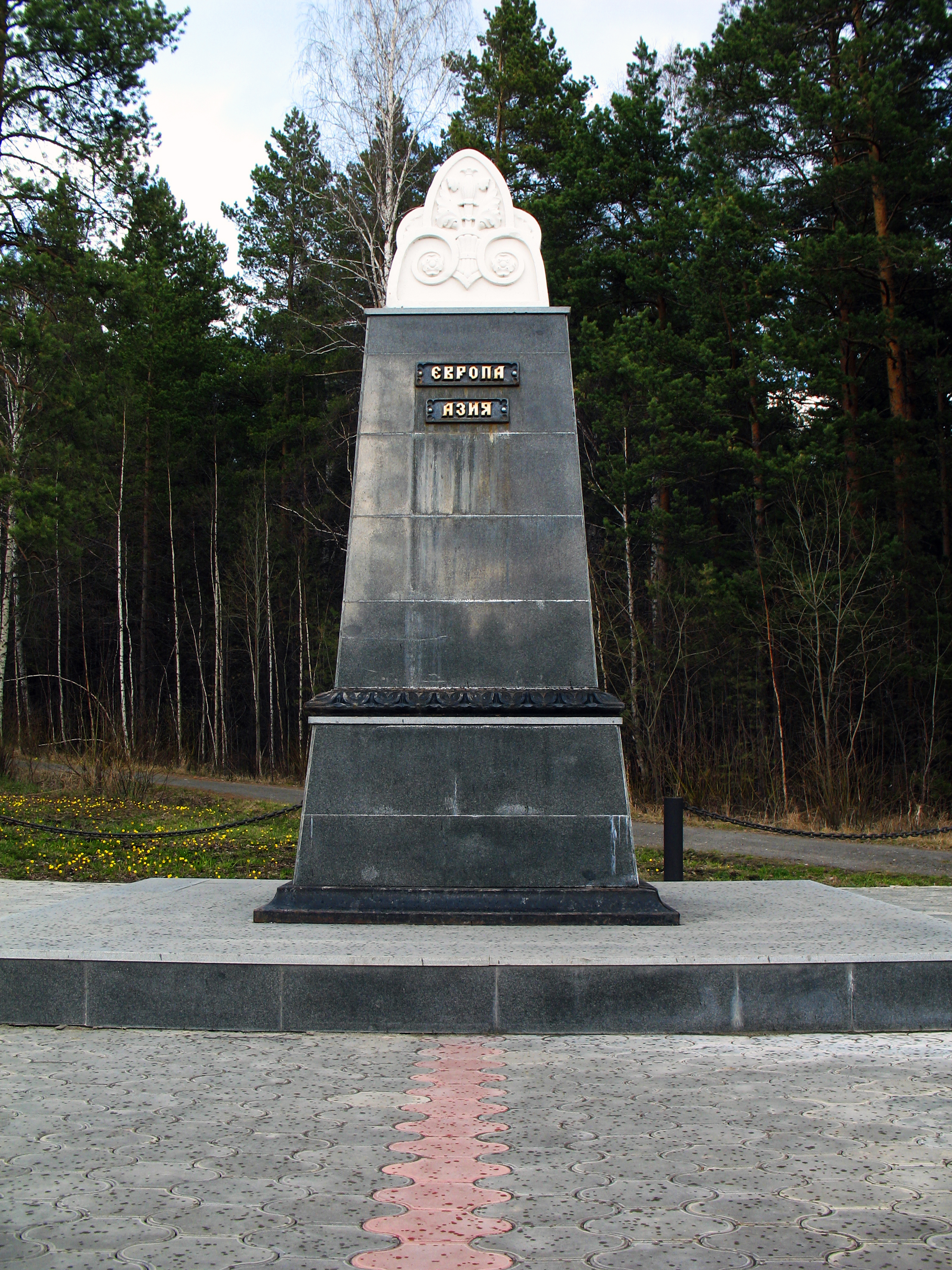
Pervouralsk, Russia - 1837. Stone marking the border between Europe and Asia; it was previously located on Berezovaya Mountain (where Dostoevsky saw it) and was moved here in 2008 to allow the construction of the current grandiose monument, illustrated in the previous photo.

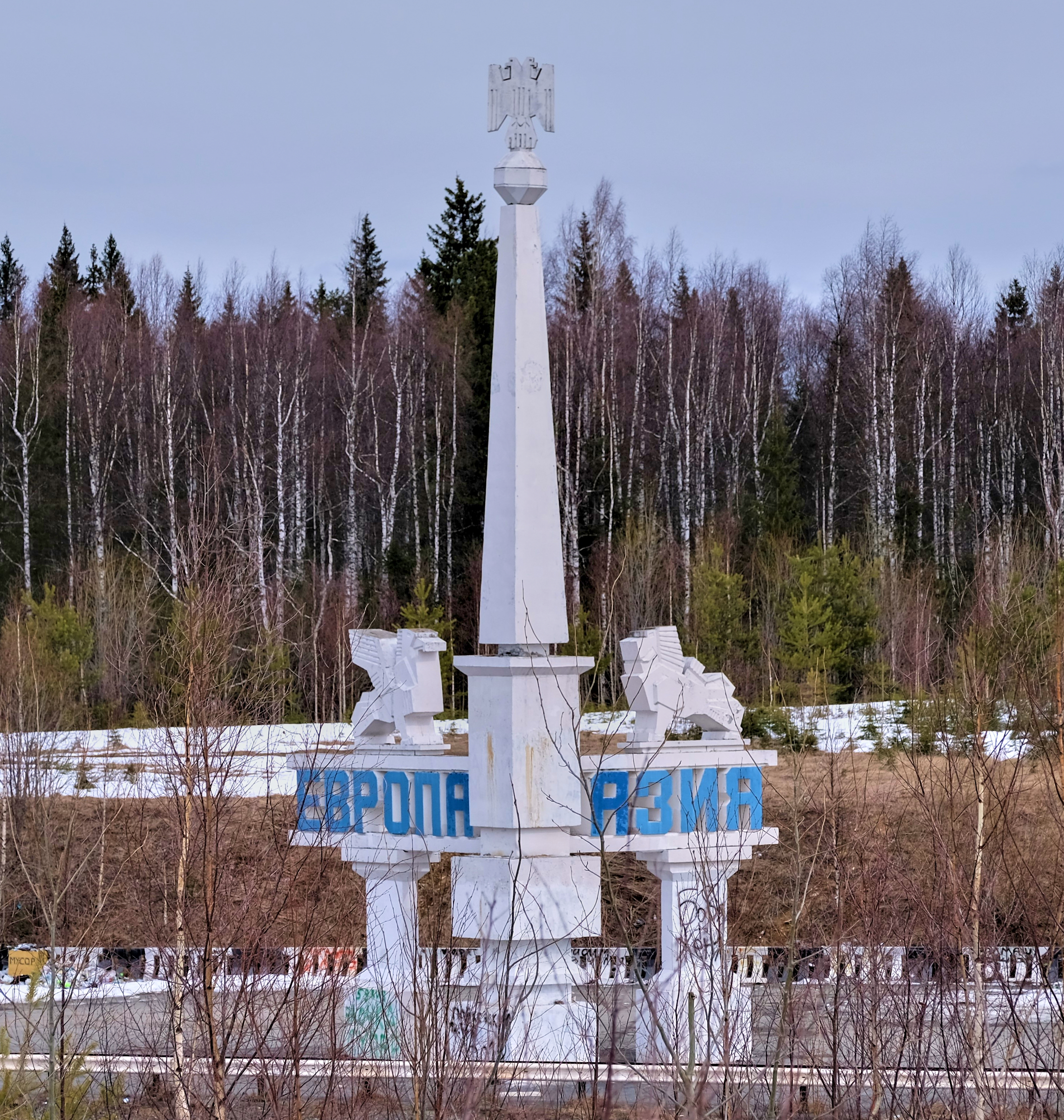
Highway Chusovoy - Nizhny Tagil, Russia - 2003

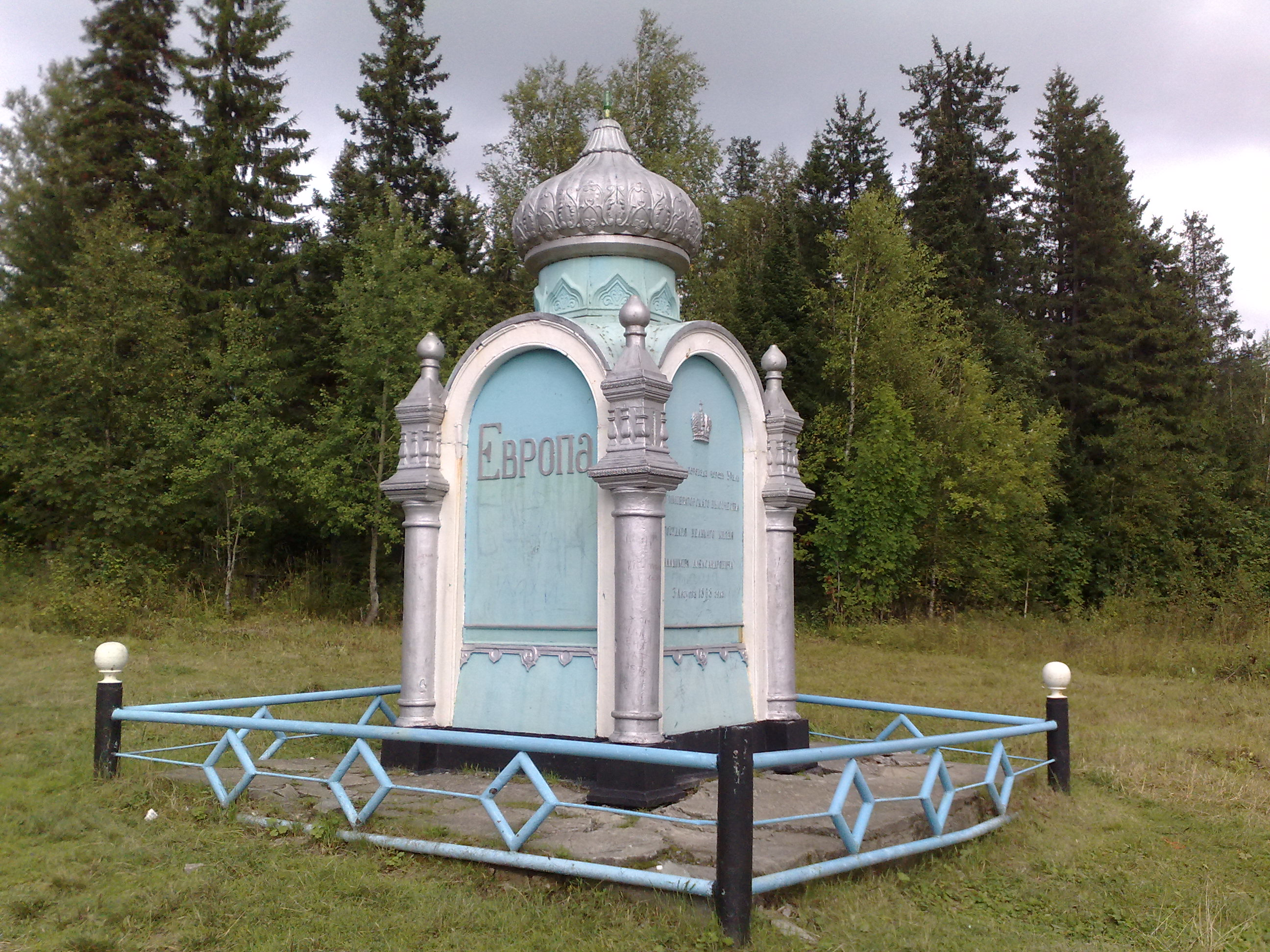
Mount Kedrovka, surroundings of Kushva, Russia - 1868. Europe-Asia border sign, installed on the initiative and at the expense of the workers of the Ural gold mines

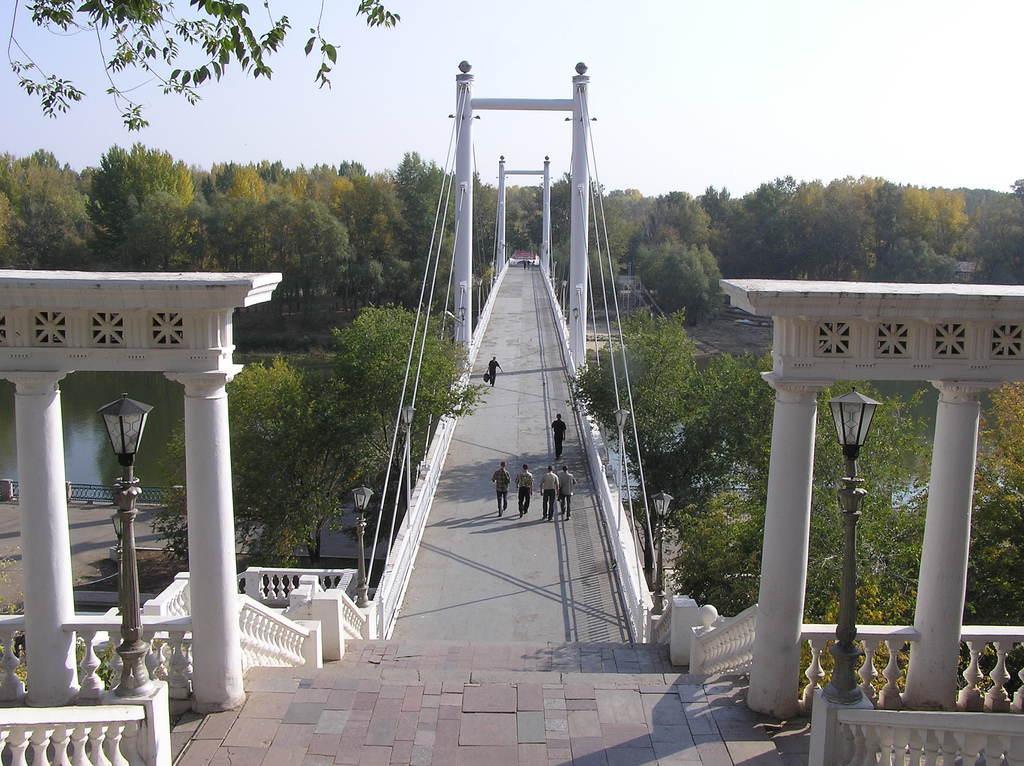
Orenburg, Russia - 1982. The "White Bridge", in the center of which there are two border pillars with the writings ЕВРОПА ("Europe") and АЗИЯ ("Asia")

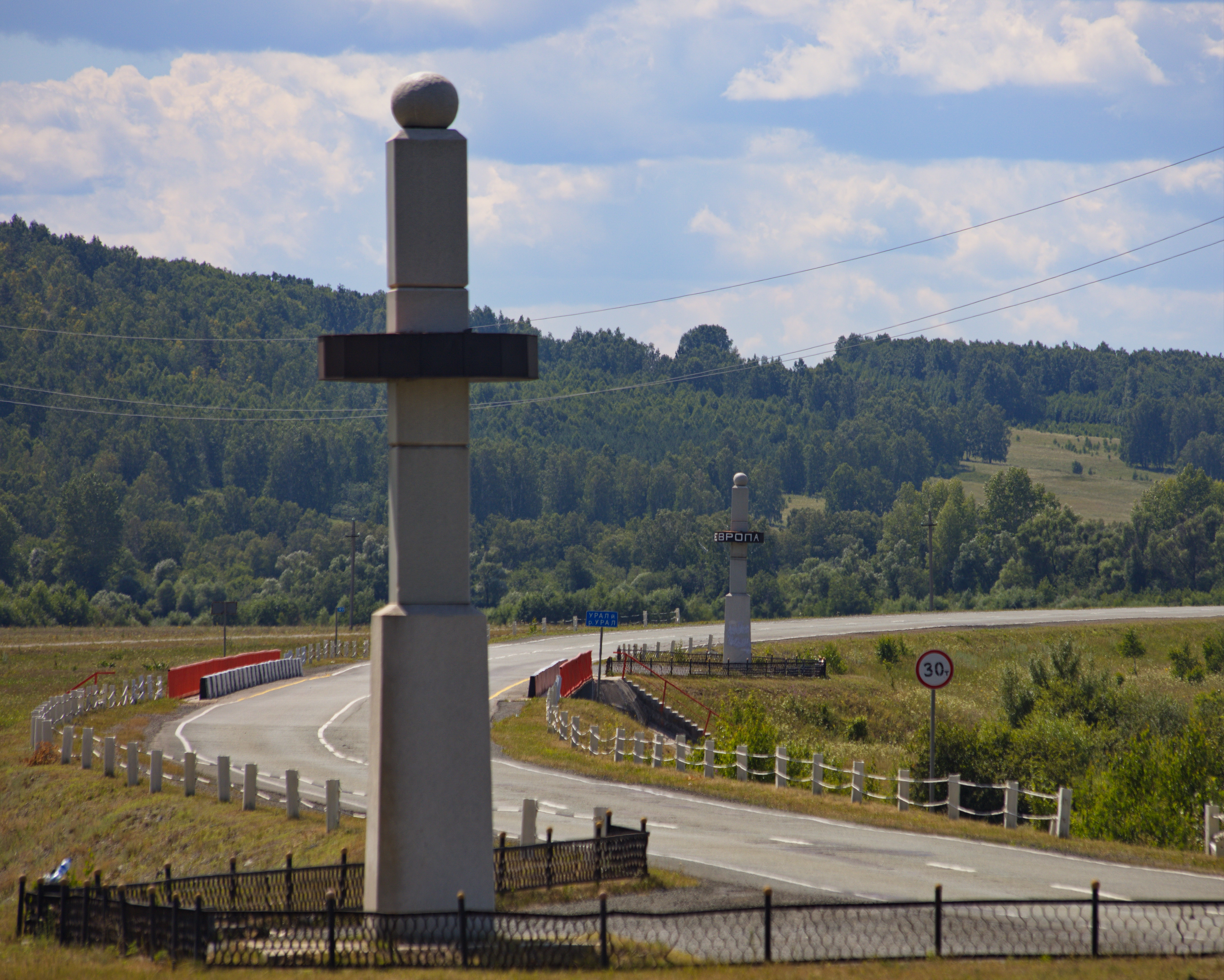
Oral - Ural'sk, Kazakhstan

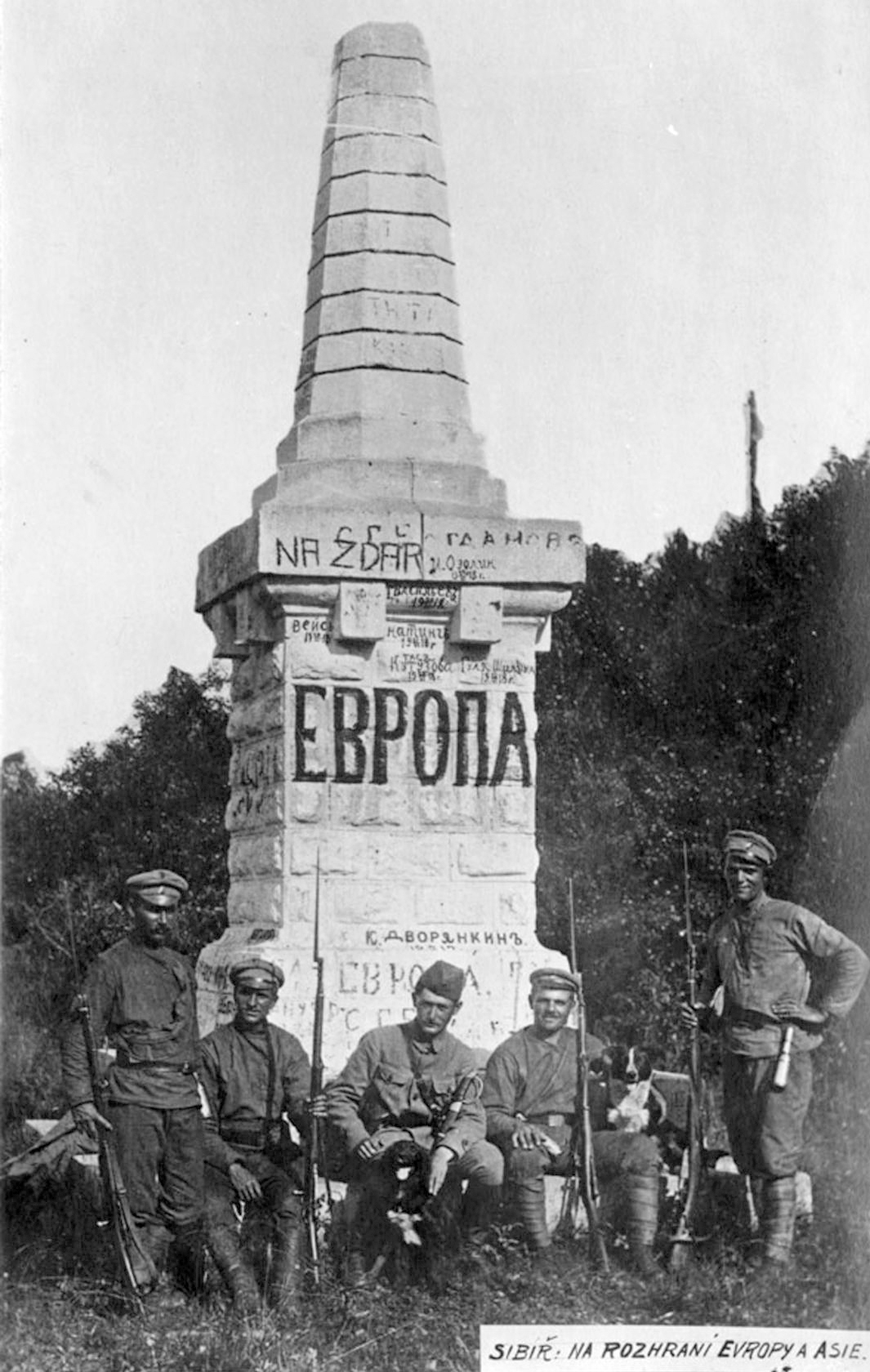
Trans-Siberian Railway, Russia - 1892. In this historical photo, one of the first continental border signs, near the Urzhum station. It was inaugurated together with the station and the section of the Trans-Siberian railway that crosses the Europe-Asia border.

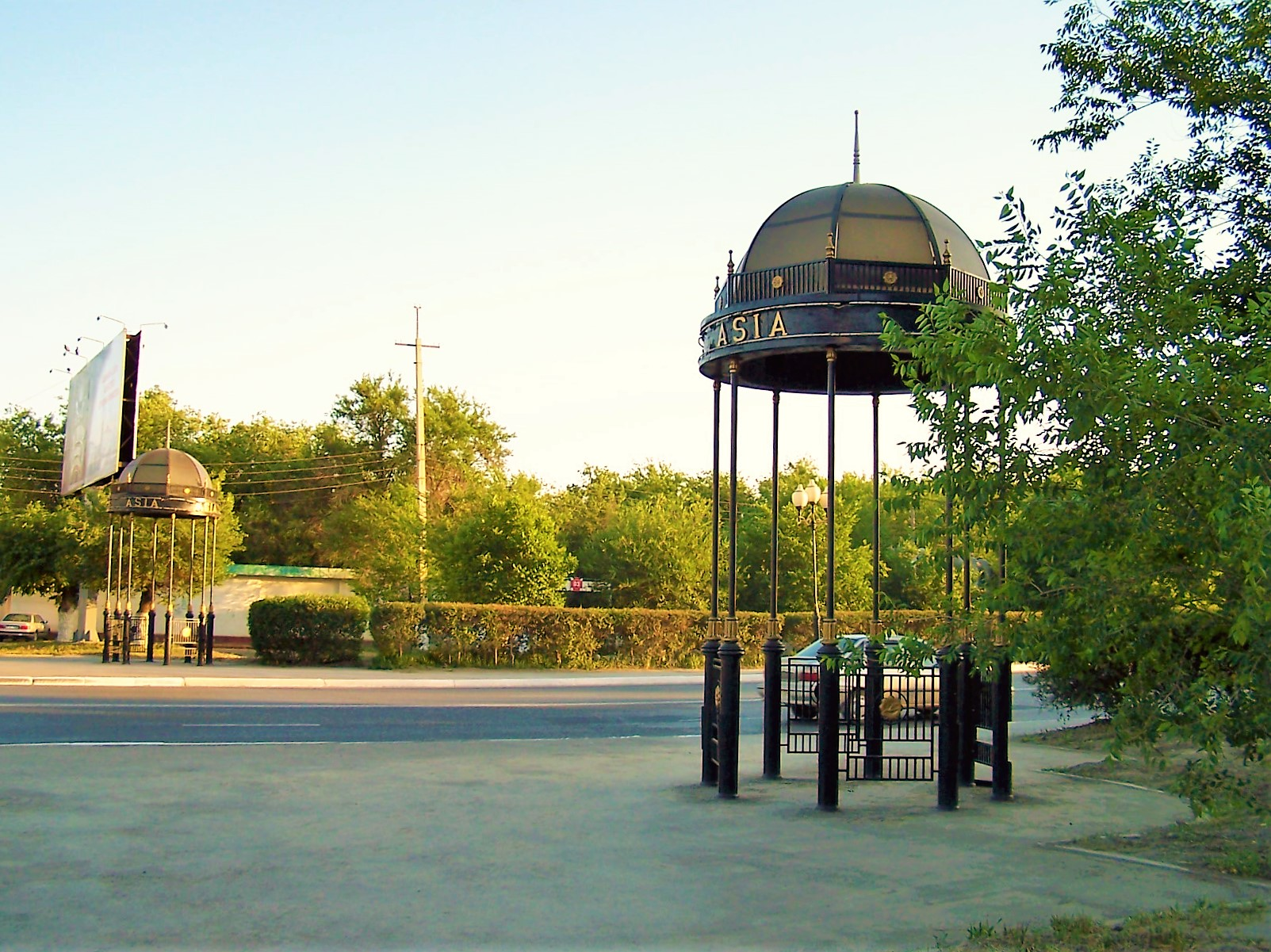
Atyrau, Kazakhstan. Small pavilions signaling the entrance to Asia. Beyond the Ural bridge there are two identical ones that signal the entrance to Europe

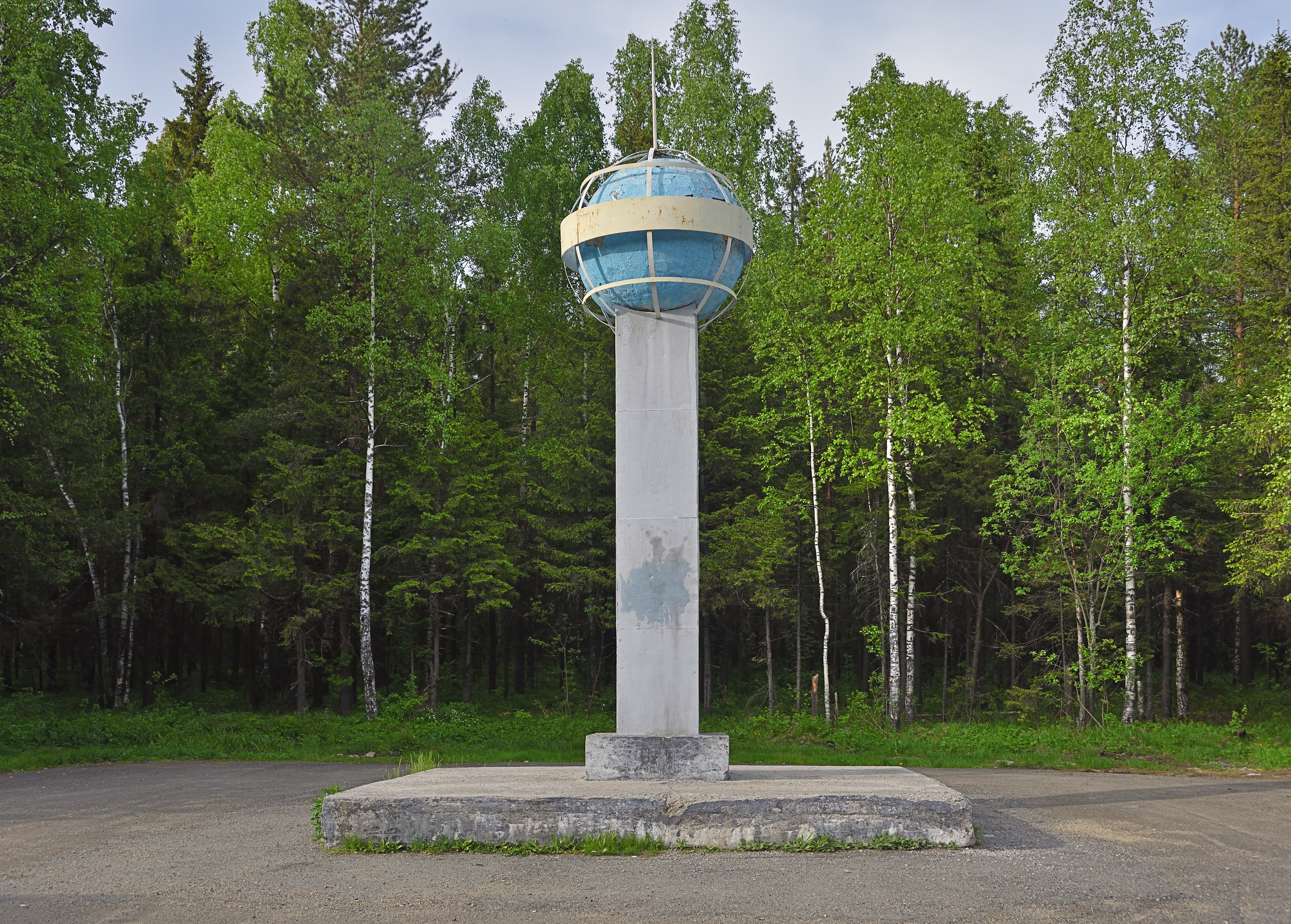
Uralets, Sverdlovsk oblast, Russia. Erected in 1961 and dedicated to the first successes of Soviet cosmonautics, it was built by workers of the mechanical plant in the village of Uralets. The pillar is crowned by a globe of the Earth and, originally, by a model of the Vostok space capsule

== Works ==
- Das Nord- und Ostliche Theil von Europa und Asia, 1730 (English translation reprinted in 1970 under the title Russia, Siberia, and Great Tartary)
- Description Historique de l'Empire Russien, 1757

== See also ==
- Johan Renat
