= Rinat =

Given name

Rinat is a Tatar masculine given name. Rinat (רינת) is also a Hebrew language feminine name, and may refer to:

- Rinat Abdulin, Kazakhstani football player
- Rinat Akhmetov (born 1966), Ukrainian business man, multi-billionaire
- Rinat Akhmetshin, Russian-American lobbyist and former Soviet counterintelligence officer
- Rinat Brodach (born 1984), Israeli American fashion designer
- Rinat Dasayev (born 1957), Russian former football goalkeeper of Tatar ethnicity
- Rinat Farkhoutdinov (born 1975), Russian ice dancer who competed internationally for Japan
- Rinat Gutman (born 1980), Israeli rapper, singer, and songwriter
- Rinat Ibragimov (born 1986), Russian ice hockey player
- Rinat Ibragimov (born 1986), Kazakhstani judoka
- Rinat Kedem (born 1965), American mathematician and mathematical physicist
- Rinat Mardanshin (1963–2005), Russian motorcycle speedway rider
- Rinat Matatov (born 1981), Israeli actress
- Rinat Shaham (born 1980), Israeli mezzo-soprano singer
- Rinat Timokhin (born 1980), Russian football player
- Rinat Valiev (born 1995), ethnic Tatar-Russian hockey player in Toronto Maple Leafs organization
- Rinat Vasikov (born 1971), retired Russian professional footballer

As a surname:

- Avraham Rinat (1929–2025), Dutch-Israeli theoretical physicist

== See also ==
- Renat
