= Saint Renatus =

French and Italian Catholic saint

Bishop
- Venerated in: Roman Catholic Church
- Feast: October 6; November 12
- Patronage: Statue of San Renato (Saint Renatus) of Sorrento

Saint Renatus (Italian: San Renato, French: Saint-René) is the name of a French and an Italian saint of the Catholic Church who is claimed to be the same person. There are different stories of two saints with by the name Renatus, who were later merged into a single one based on their described similarities and contemporaneity. Both are venerated in Italy and France. They were: Saint Renatus of Sorrento (San Renato di Sorrento), and Saint Renatus of Angers (Saint-René d'Angers). Part of their stories seem to be a legend, part incomplete and part deficient historically documented.

Due to the Angevin domination of Naples from the 13th to the 15th century, and the fact that they were both bishops and saints from the same age, the personality of Renatus of Sorrento was linked with the figure of Renatus of Angers.

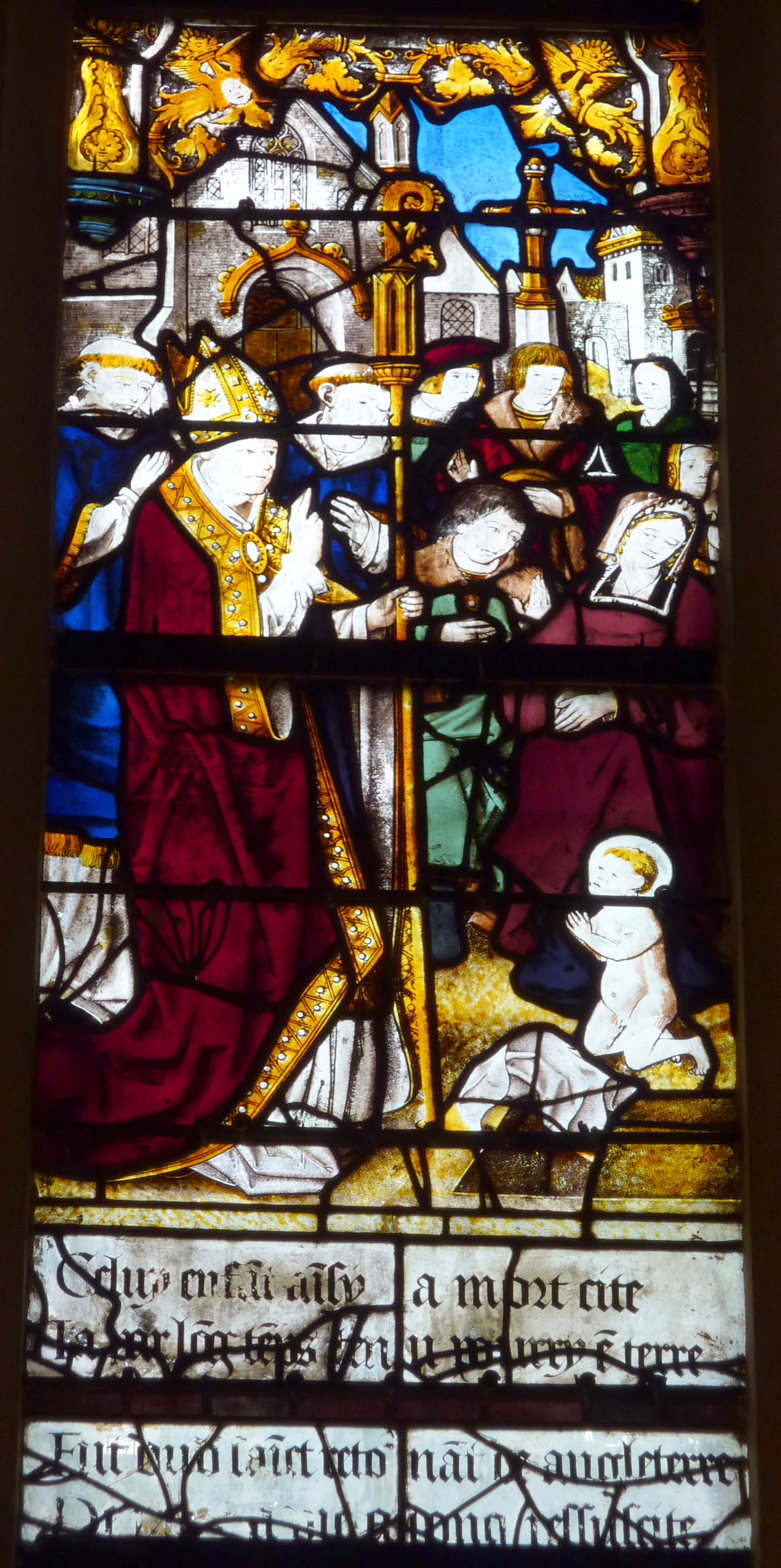
Maurilius of Angers and saint Renatus of Angers

== Saint Renatus of Angers (Saint-René d'Angers) ==
The first story of the lesser known Saint-René began when the Italian Saint Maurilius, the bishop of the French city of Angers (Anjou) in the 5th century, was one day called to assist a moribund child. Unfortunately he was detained by a pressing task in the church, and arrived too late to minister the sacrament of baptism to the child. Feeling responsible for the loss, Maurice decided to expiate it, and left Angers in secret and embarked upon a ship, throwing the keys to the cathedral's treasury into the high seas. He then went further to England, to work as the royal gardener. Meanwhile, the inhabitants of Angers had found the keys inside the liver of a big fish which was caught by the local fishermen. They traced the whereabouts of the bishop to England and convinced him to return to their city. Arriving at Angers, Maurilius prayed at the dead child's tomb, and, in a miracle, the child resuscitated, smiling, "fresh as the flowers growing on the tomb". Because of this Maurilius baptized the boy as Renatus. The tradition is based on a late life of St. Maurilius written in 905 by the deacon Archinald, and circulated under the name of Gregory of Tours, and it seems to have no real foundation.

Renatus later succeeded Maurilius as the bishop of Angers, and came to sainthood himself, later as Saint René (French for reborn).

Saint-René is mostly venerated in France on November 12.

== Saint Renatus of Sorrento (San Renato di Sorrento) ==
The second story of the better known San Renato is about a bishop in the 5th century who lived in the city of Sorrento, near Naples, in the province of Campania; therefore he was a member of the early Christian church. He was the first bishop of Sorrento, and probably was one of the hermits who lived in the hills near the city. According to Antonio Borrelli, he may have been an early member of the hermits, such as Catellus of Castellammare or Antoninus of Sorrento, who lived between the 7th and 9th centuries as hermits on the hills of the Sorrentine Peninsula.

A homily dedicated to the saint, composed at the end of the eighth century, does not refer to him as a bishop, nor is he mentioned as such in the Life of Saint Antoninus, Abbot of Sorrento, composed in the 9th century or sometime after. The Life includes a description of the saints obtained from painting hanging at the time in the cathedral of Sorrento. In this work, Renatus is depicted as an old man and appears with the patron saints of Sorrento: Antoninus of Sorrento, Athanasius of Sorrento, Baculus of Sorrento, and Valerius of Sorrento. In the narrative, the saints appear to Duke Sergius I of Naples on the eve of battle against Moorish forces in 846 AD.

Renatus' place of prayer (oratorio) became the city's first cathedral, which later was substituted in 1603 by a big basilica built by the Benedictines of Monte Cassino, during a time of renewed interest in the relics associated with Renatus and Valerius of Sorrento.

Renatus’ cult was diffused throughout Campania. In Sorrento there was a chapel in the cathedral dedicated to the saint, where he is venerated with the title of Confessor of the Faith. On Monte Faito, in the Municipality of Vico Equense, there was a small church dedicated to Renatus.

Several centers for Renatus’ cult appeared in Naples, and are mentioned in documents dating from July 1276 and March 1367. There were also centers of his cult in Capua, Sarno, and Nola in the fourteenth century.

The present-day Duomo of Sorrento has a chapel dedicated to San Renato. He was also venerated on October 6.

== Fusion ==
The story goes on when in 1262, Charles I d'Anjou, a prince of the House of Anjou, now a powerful dynasty, conquered Naples. The French conquerors soon discovered the local saint of devotion, Saint Renatus of Sorrento. The Sorrentini became acquainted with the story of Saint Renatus of Angers. Since they seemed to be contemporaries, and were physically described by their contemporaries as being very similar (a bald old man, with a long beard) one single figure of devotion was born by common consent, and the legend was amplified by telling how the Bishop of Angers came to Sorrento in old age, and went to live as a hermit, and became the new Bishop of Sorrento. Thus, Renatus of Angers and Renatus of Sorrento were identified as being the same person. Although plausible, no historical and documental proof of this identity ever came to light, however.

== Veneration ==
Saint Renatus of Angers, by confusion of his name with reins, "kidneys" (once believed to be the seat of sexual power) was invoked for fertility as one of the phallic saints.

== Trivia ==
About a millennium after the saints lived, René of Anjou, named after Saint-René and born in the castle of Angers became King René I of Naples (near Sorrento). He was known as the Good King René (French Le bon roi René).

== Sources ==
- (in Italian) San Renato di Angers. Santi e Beati.
- (in Italian) San Renato di Sorrento. Santi e Beati.
