= Renata Lavagnini =

Italian professor (born 1942)

- Born: 1942 (age 83–84); Palermo, Italy

Academic work
- Discipline: Byzantine studies Hellenic studies
- Institutions: University of Palermo
- Main interests: Constantine Cavafy

Renata Lavagnini (born in 1942 in Palermo) is an Italian Neo-Hellenist and Byzantinist and a professor of Modern Greek language and literature at the University of Palermo.

== Biography ==
She was born in 1942 in Palermo. Her father was the eminent Byzantinist Bruno Lavagnini. She had a sister named Maria. After her studies, Lavagnini graduated from the University of Palermo in 1965 and began teaching at this institution.

The researcher had a particular interest in Constantine Cavafy, whom she extensively studied. She managed to uncover about thirty of his unfinished poems that had not yet been published. She established the editio princeps of a number of Cavafy's works.
