= Elisabet Fritz =

Swedish industrialist (d. 1752)

Elisabet Fritz née Lenström, also known as Elisabet Renat (died 1752) was a Swedish industrialist. She managed the Fritz Silk Factory in Stockholm from 1737 to 1749, which had been founded by her late spouse as one of the first silk factories in Stockholm, and which was one of the biggest and most successful of the Swedish silk industry under her leadership in the mid 18th-century.

Elisabet Fritz was married to Isac Fritz (d. 1737), with whom she had three sons. Her spouse founded a silk factory in Stockholm in 1731 (though it was not given formal permit until 1734). This was the first silk factory in Stockholm alongside the one which was founded in 1732. After she was widowed in 1737, she took over the business. She remarried Johan Gustaf Renat in 1739. In accordance with the Civil Code of 1734, a married woman was a minor under the guardianship of her husband, and through her remarriage, she was formally no longer the owner and management of the factory. However, in practice she is openly acknowledged to have continued as the managing director of the Fritz Factory by the commercial authorities, who explicitly referred to her management and negotiated with her under their dealings with the Fritz business.
