= Johan Renat =

Swedish soldier and cartographer (1682–1744)

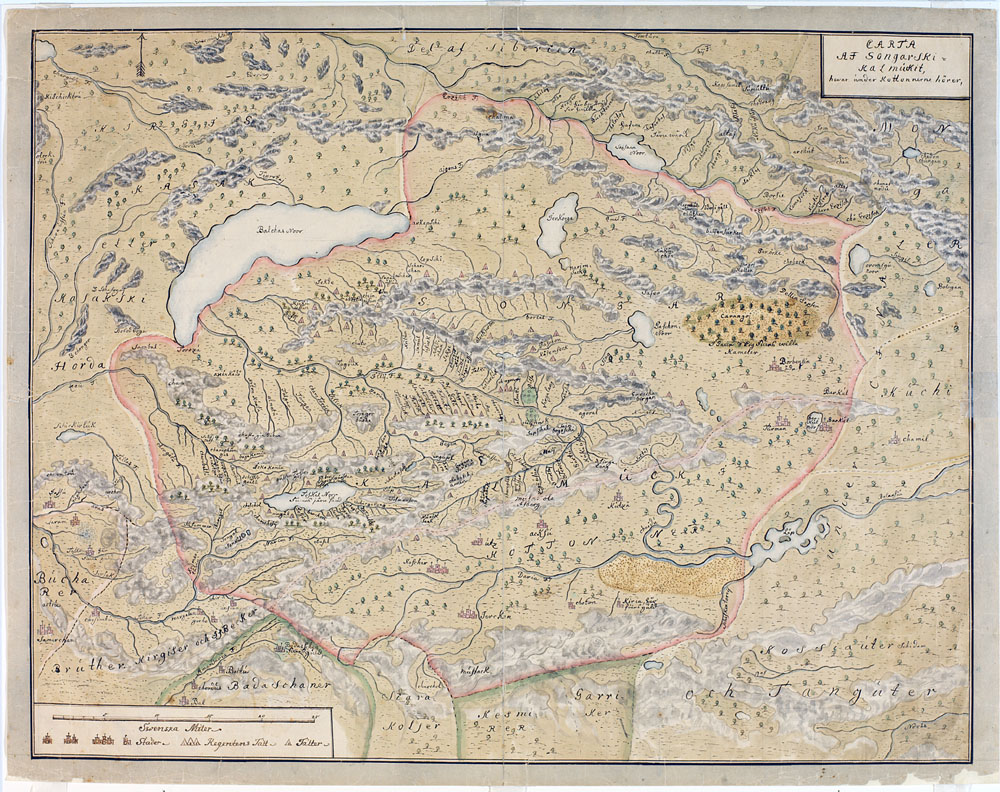
One of Renat's maps of Dzungaria

Johan Gustaf Renat (1682–1744) was a Swedish soldier and cartographer. He is primarily known for his role in bringing detailed maps of Central Asia to Europe after close to two decades in captivity.

== Early career and Russian captivity ==
Renat was the son of Dutch Jewish immigrants to Sweden, who converted to Christianity and took Swedish citizenship in 1681, the year before his birth.

During the Great Northern War against Russia, he served in the army of Charles XII as a warrant officer (styckjunkare) in the artillery. He was taken prisoner after the Battle of Poltava in 1709. In 1711, Renat was sent to Tobolsk—then the capital of Russian Siberia—where many Swedish officers were kept as prisoners of war. He entered Russian military service on the condition of not fighting against Sweden. Renat helped produce maps of Siberia for the Russian government.

In 1716, Renat and other Swedish prisoners of war took part in Ivan Buchholz [ru]'s expedition to explore the gold deposits around Lake Yamysh on the Irtysh River. The expedition was ambushed by a Dzungar force, and Renat spent the following seventeen years as an Oirat slave.

== Dzungarian captivity and return to Sweden ==
In Dzungaria, Renat helped the khans Tsewang Rabtan and Galdan Tseren organize their campaigns against Qing rule in Central Asia. Among other things, he organized an artillery regiment and helped the Dzungars cast cannons.

Renat also met a Swedish woman who was also a Dzungar captive. This was Brigitta Scherzenfeldt, who hailed from Scania. Twice widowed, she had married a German prisoner who had taken Russian service and been assigned to Siberia. Their convoy was seized by Dzungar raiders in 1716, who killed her husband. She later married Renat.

In 1733, Renat and his wife were allowed to leave. They returned the following year to Stockholm, accompanied by four Dzungar female servants, who were baptized when they arrived in Sweden. Renat's family bought a house in Gamla stan, where they settled down. In 1739, Renat was promoted to the rank of captain in the Swedish army. The same year, he remarried the industrialist Elisabet Fritz.

== Central Asian maps ==
Renat brought two detailed maps of Central Asia back to Sweden. But these maps were left in relative obscurity for many years. In 1878, copies of the maps were discovered by the Swedish author August Strindberg, then an assistant librarian at the Swedish Royal Library. He sponsored their republication in Russia in 1881. A decade later, the originals were discovered in the library of Uppsala University, where they are still held.

Strindberg remained interested in the maps for many years.

== Media ==
- His book is not available in English.
- He appears in a Russian film called The Conquest of Siberia ("Tobol"), but it completely changes his story.
- His life is depicted in an online book Renatus: The Dzungarian Gates, which fictionalizes his life and the Dzungar Khanate.

== See also ==
- Philip Johan von Strahlenberg

== Sources ==
- Baddeley, John F. Russia, Mongolia, China .... vol. 1-2, London: Macmillan and Company, 1919. Reprinted New York: Burt Franklin, 196-. Reprinted Mansfield Centre, Conn.: Martino Pub., 2006. ISBN 1-57898-641-9.
- Perdue, Peter C. China Marches West: The Qing Conquest of Central Eurasia. Cambridge, MA: Belknap Press of Harvard University Press, 2005.
- Poppe, Nicholas. "Renat's Kalmuck Maps." Imago Mundi 12 (1955): 157-59. Available through JSTOR.
- Selling, Gösta. "Artur Hazelius födelsehus I." Fataburen: Kulturhistorisk tidskrift (1926): 65-118. (in Swedish)
- Åberg, Alf, and Göte Göransson. Karoliner. Höganäs: Bra böcker, 1976. (In Swedish.)

== Work ==
- Renat, Johan Gustaf. Carte de la Dzoungarie: dressée par le suédois Renat pendant sa captivité chez les kalmouks de 1716-1733. St. Petersburg: Societé Impériale Russe de Géographie, 1881.
