= Renate =

Renate is a feminine given name. It is derived from the Latin name Renatus. It is common in German, Dutch and Norwegian.

Notable people with the given name include:

- Renate Aschauer-Knaup (born 1948), German singer (Amon Düül II)
- Renate Blauel, music engineer, formerly married to Elton John
- Renate den Hollander (born 1977), Dutch politician
- Renate Dorrestein (1954–2018), Dutch writer, journalist and feminist
- Renate Gebhard (born 1977), Italian jurist and politician
- Renate Götschl (born 1975), Austrian alpine skier
- Renate Groenewold (born 1976), Dutch speed skater
- Renate Hellwig (born 1940), German politician
- Renate Holub (born 1946), German political philosopher and social theorist
- Renate Kamener (1933–2009), Australian educator
- Renate Klein (born 1945), Australian writer, publisher and feminist health activist
- Renate Künast (born 1955), German Minister of Consumer Protection, Food and Agriculture, 2001–2005
- Renāte Lāce (1943–1967), Latvian track and field athlete
- Renate Loll (born 1962), Dutch physicist
- Renate Müller (1906–1937), German actress
- Renate Prince (born 1929), German-New Zealand architect
- Renate Reinsve, (born 1987), Norwegian actress
- Renate Schmidt (born 1943), German Social Democratic politician
- Renate Sommer (born 1958), German politician and Member of the European Parliament
- Renate Stecher (born 1950), German athlete and Olympic champion
- Renate Tobies (born 1947), German historian of mathematics
- Renate von Natzmer (1898–1935), German noble lady convicted of spying and treason
- Silvia Renate Bernadotte (born 1943), Queen consort of King Carl XVI Gustaf of Sweden
- Marion Rose Wiesel (born Mary Renate Erster; 1931–2025), Austrian-American Holocaust survivor, humanitarian, and translator
