= Renato Peduzzi =

Italian sculptor

Renato Peduzzi (born 1839, died 7-19-1884) was an Italian sculptor.

He was a resident of Milan, and competed in many exhibitions, obtaining prizes and acclaim. In Parma, in 1870, he sent: a marble statuette of Springtime; to Milan, in 1872: a sculptural group for a fountain La pesca (Fishing); Il fanciullo che si trastulla con un cigno; to Naples in 1877: I primi salti; to Turin, in 1880: Conseguenze della guerra; Berenice; in 1883 at Milan: Portrait per monumento funebre, and finally in Rome, in 1883: L'affarista a Trastullo infantile. His Berenice was also exhibited at the International Exhibition at Philadelphia in 1876.
