= René =

René (born again or reborn in French) is a common first name in French-speaking, Spanish-speaking, and German-speaking countries. It derives from the Latin name Renatus.

René is the masculine form of the name (Renée being the French feminine). However, in some non-Francophone countries there developed a habit of giving the name René (sometimes spelled without an accent) to girls as well as boys. In addition, both forms are used as surnames (family names).

René as a first name given to boys in the United States reached its peaks in popularity in 1969 and 1983 when it ranked 256th. Since 1983 its popularity has steadily declined and it ranked 881st in 2016. René as a first name given to girls in the United States reached its peak in popularity in 1962 when it ranked 306th. The last year for which René was ranked in the top 1000 names given to girls in the United States was 1988.

== Persons with the given name ==
=== Academics, philosophers and religious ===
- René de Birague (1505–1583), cardinal of the Catholic Church
- René Descartes (1596–1650), French philosopher, scientist and mathematician
- René Goupil (1608–1642), French Catholic martyr and saint
- René Grousset (1885–1952), French historian
- René Guénon (1886–1951), French metaphysician and Sufi initiate
- René Thom (1923–2002), French mathematician
- René Girard (1923-2015), French historian, literary critic, and philosopher
- René Henry Gracida (1923–2026), American Catholic prelate
- René Chamussy (1936–2016), French-Lebanese Jesuit priest and academic administrator

=== Artists, singers, and writers ===
- René Rozet (1858–1939), French sculptor
- Rene Cinquin (1898–1978), American cartographer and painter
- René Deltgen (1909–1979), Luxembourgish actor
- René Carol (1920–1978), German singer
- René Mauriès (1921–1999), French journalist, reporter and writer
- René Goscinny (1926–1977), French comic book editor and writer
- René Ballet (1928–2017), French journalist, novelist and essayist
- René Muñoz (1938–2000), Cuban actor and scriptwriter
- René Auberjonois (1940–2019), American actor
- René Angélil (1942–2016), Canadian music producer and agent
- René Frégni (born 1947), French novelist
- Rene Russo (born 1954), American actress
- René Froger (born 1960), Dutch singer
- René Simard (born 1961), Canadian singer
- Rene Farrait (born 1967), Puerto Rican singer, member of boy band Menudo
- Rene Bitorajac (born 1972), Croatian actor
- René Juan Pérez Joglar (born 1978), known professionally as Residente, is a Puerto Rican rapper, writer and filmmaker
- Rene Aranda (born 1990), American actress
- Rene Kirby, American actor
- René Kollo, German tenor
- René Magritte, Belgian surrealist painter
- René Marqués, Puerto Rican short story writer and playwright
- Rene Mederos, Cuban poster artist and graphic designer
- Rene Medvešek, Croatian actor
- René Pape, German opera singer
- René Steinke (actor), German actor
- René Steinke (author), American novelist
- René Villa, Costa Rican singer

=== Cuisine and couture ===
- René Bégué (1887–1987), French fashion designer
- René Arend (1928–2016), Luxembourgish American chef, McDonald's first executive chef

=== Medieval nobility ===
- René, Duke of Anjou (1409–1480), titular king of Naples and Jerusalem
- René II, Duke of Lorraine (1451–1508), grandson of René of Anjou
- René I, Viscount of Rohan (1516–1552), warrior of the Italian War of 1551–1559
- René II, Viscount of Rohan (1550–1586), his Huguenot son

=== Military ===
- René de Froulay de Tessé (1648–1725), French marshal
- René Reille (1835–1898), French soldier, industrialist, politician
- René Fonck (1894–1953), French aviator and most successful pilot in World War I
- Rene Gagnon (1925–1979), American World War II veteran, raised the American flag during the battle of Iwo Jima
- René Bricard (died 2015), French resistance fighter

=== Politicians ===
- René Barthel (born 1982), German politician
- René Coty (1882–1962), former president of France
- René Toribio (1912–1990), Guadeloupean politician
- René Bernatchez (1913–1980), Canadian politician
- René Lamps (1915–2007), French politician
- René Lévesque (1922–1987), Canadian journalist and politician, premier of Quebec
- Rene Plasencia (born 1973), Florida House of Representatives member

=== Professionals and business ===
- René Favaloro (1923–2000), Argentine cardiac surgeon
- René Mornex (1927–2022), French doctor and academic
- René Barents (born 1951), Dutch judge and legal scholar
- René Bernards (born 1953), Dutch oncologist
- René Prêtre (born 1957), Swiss pediatric cardiovascular surgeon
- René Janssen (born 1959), Dutch nanotechnologist
- René Obermann (born 1963), German businessman
- René Lépine, Canadian businessman and real estate developer

=== Sports ===
- René Léonard (1889-1965), French racing driver
- René Lacoste (1904-1997), French tennis player and businessman
- René Gaulon (1927–2012), Beninese footballer and manager
- René Robert (1948–2021), Canadian ice hockey player
- René Deutschmann (born 1951), French footballer
- René Weller (1953–2023), German boxer
- Rene Capo (1961–2009), Cuban-American judoka
- René Sporleder (born 1969), German judoka
- René Ruitenberg (1970), Dutch speed skater
- René Vydarený (born 1981), Slovak ice hockey player
- Rene Ranger (born 1986), New Zealand rugby player
- René Rast (born 1986), German racing driver
- René Rougeau (born 1986), American basketball player for Maccabi Haifa, Israel
- Renê (footballer, born 1992), Brazilian footballer
- René Binder (born 1992), Austrian racing driver
- Rene Konga (born 2002), Cameroonian-Canadian American football player
- Renê (footballer, born 2003), Brazilian footballer
- René Reyes, American baseball player

== Fictional characters ==
- René Artois, the French protagonist in the British television comedy series 'Allo 'Allo played by Gordon Kaye

== Persons with this surname ==
- Denise René (1919–2012), French art dealer
- France-Albert René (1935–2019), second President of Seychelles
- Lisa Rene (1978–1994), American murder victim
- Mélanie René (born 1990), Swiss singer
- Wendy Rene (1947–2014), American soul singer and songwriter

== Variants in different languages ==
- Renát Hungarian, Slovak
- Renat Catalan, Polish
- Renato Italian, Portuguese, Spanish
- Renátus Slovak
- Renatus Latin
- Rene Finnish
- René Czech, French, German, Slovak, Spanish, Dutch, Danish
- Röné Hungarian
- Ренат Russian
