= Cinquin =

Cinquin is a surname. Notable people with this surname include:

- Emmanuelle Cinquin (1908–2008), Belgian-French Catholic nun and humanitarian
- Rene Cinquin (1898–1978), American cartographer and painter

== See also ==
- Cinquain
- Cinqui
- Cinquini
