= Cinquini =

Cinquini (pronounced [tʃiŋˈkwiːni]) is an Italian surname from Lucca and Lombardy, derived from cinque 'five' and possibly expressing the concept of 'five hundred grams'. Notable people with this surname include:

- Elia Cinquini (born 1991), Italian field hockey player, son of Mauro
- Maria Cibrario Cinquini (1905–1992), Italian mathematician, married to Silvio
- Mattia Cinquini (born 1990), Italian footballer
- Mauro Cinquini (born 1960), Italian field hockey player and coach, father of Elia
- Muzio Cinquini (died 1627), Italian Catholic bishop
- Oreste Cinquini (born 1947), Italian sporting director
- Renato Cinquini (fl. 1950–1977), Italian film editor
- Roberto Cinquini (1924–1965), Italian film editor
- Silvio Cinquini (1906–1998), Italian mathematician, married to Maria

== See also ==
- Cinqui
- Cinquin
- Cinquetti
