= Begue =

Begue or Bégué or Bègue is a surname. Notable people with the surname include:

- Ambroise Begue (born 1995), French footballer
- Georges Bégué (1911–1993), French engineer
- Gloria Begué Cantón (1931–2016), Spanish professor, jurist, senator and magistrate
- Lambert le Bègue, priest and reformer
- René Bégué (1887–1987), French fashion designer
- René Le Bègue (1914–1946), French race car driver
- René Le Bègue (1856–1914), French photographer
- Valérie Bègue (born 1985), French reality television personality and beauty queen

== See also ==
- Bègues, Allier, France
