= 2009 Superstars Series =

Seasons
- ← 2008 2010 →

The 2009 Superstars Series season was the sixth season of the Campionato Italiano Superstars (Italian Superstars Championship) and the third season of the International Superstars Series. Both championships were won by Gianni Morbidelli driving for BMW.

== Teams and drivers ==
Team	Car	No.	Drivers	Rounds
(Italy) ROAL Motorsport	BMW M3 (E90)	1	(Italy) Gianni Morbidelli	All
(Italy) ROAL Motorsport	BMW M3 (E90)	11	(Italy) Francesco Ascani	All
(Italy) Ferlito Motors	Jaguar S-Type R	2	(Italy) Ivan Benvenuti	1–2
(Italy) Ferlito Motors	Jaguar S-Type R	2	(Italy) Moreno Petrini	3
(Italy) Ferlito Motors	Jaguar S-Type R	2	(Italy) Alessandro Cacciari	4–5
(Italy) Ferlito Motors	Jaguar S-Type R	2	(Italy) Walter Nudo	6–7
(Italy) Ferlito Motors	Jaguar S-Type R	2	(Italy) Pierluigi Veronesi	8
(Italy) Ferlito Motors	Jaguar XF SV8	2	(Italy) Francesco Dracone	9
(Italy) Ferlito Motors	Jaguar S-Type R	3	(Italy) Ermanno Dionisio	1–7
(Italy) Audi Sport Italia	Audi RS4 (B7)	3	(Italy) Ermanno Dionisio	8-9
(Italy) Audi Sport Italia	Audi RS4 (B7)	4	(Portugal) Filipe Albuquerque	5
(Italy) Audi Sport Italia	Audi RS4 (B7)	4	(Italy) Roberto Sigala	8
(Italy) Audi Sport Italia	Audi RS4 (B7)	4	(Italy) Luca Rangoni	9
(Italy) Motorzone Race Car	Chevrolet Lumina CR8	5	(Italy) Fabrizio Armetta	6, 8–9
(Italy) Motorzone Race Car	BMW M5 (E39)	33	(Italy) Fabrizio Armetta	5
(Italy) Motorzone Race Car	BMW M5 (E39)	37	(Italy) Fabrizio Armetta	1, 3–4
(Italy) Motorzone Race Car	BMW M5 (E39)	37	(Italy) Sandro Cacciari	2
(Italy) Motorzone Race Car	BMW M5 (E39)	37	(Italy) Massimo Pesci	5
(Italy) GASS Racing	BMW M5 (E39)	7	(Italy) Beppe Arlotti	1
(Italy) GASS Racing	BMW M5 (E39)	7	(Italy) Fabrizio Gini	1, 6
(Italy) Scuderia TRT	BMW M5 (E39)	7	(Italy) Fabrizio Gini	9
(Italy) Scuderia TRT	BMW M5 (E39)	7	(Italy) Alessandro Battaglin	5
(Italy) RGA Sportmanship	BMW M3 (E92)	8	(Italy) Roberto Sigala	2, 5
(Italy) RGA Sportmanship	BMW M3 (E92)	9	(Italy) Roberto Russo	1
(Italy) RGA Sportmanship	BMW M3 (E92)	10	(Italy) Nicolò Piancastelli	4
(Italy) RGA Sportmanship	BMW M3 (E92)	10	(Brazil) Walter Salles	5
(Italy) RGA Sportmanship	BMW M3 (E92)	10	(Italy) Roberto Sperati	5
(Italy) Top Run Racing	BMW M3 (E92)	9	(Italy) Roberto Russo	5–8
(San Marino) Habitat Racing	BMW M3 (E92)	12	(Italy) Walter Nudo	8
(San Marino) Habitat Racing	BMW 550i (E60)	21	(Italy) Alessandro Bernasconi	1–4, 6–8
(San Marino) Habitat Racing	BMW 550i (E60)	21	(Italy) Bruno Bollini	1, 3–8
(San Marino) Habitat Racing	BMW M3 (E92)	22	(San Marino) Christian Montanari	9
(Italy) Max Pigoli Team	Mercedes C63 AMG	18	(Italy) Max Pigoli	All
(Germany) Zakspeed Team	Chrysler 300C SRT-8	23	(Italy) Pierluigi Martini	All
(Italy) Santucci Motorsport	Cadillac CTS-V	24	(Italy) Roberto Del Castello	3, 6–7
(Italy) Santucci Motorsport	Cadillac CTS-V	27	(Italy) Roberto Del Castello	1
(Italy) Santucci Motorsport	BMW M5 (E39)	27	(Italy) Roberto Del Castello	2
(Italy) Santucci Motorsport	Cadillac CTS-V	27	(Italy) Roberto Benedetti	3, 6–7
(Italy) Vaccari Motori	BMW M5 (E39)	33	(Italy) Nico Caldarola	3–4, 6, 9
(Switzerland) Swiss Team	Maserati Quattroporte	46	(Switzerland) Andrea Chiesa	2–9
(Italy) CAAL Racing	BMW M5 (E39)	52	(Italy) Alessio Alcidi	1–2
(Italy) CAAL Racing	BMW M5 (E39)	52	(Italy) Sandro Bettini	3–4
(Italy) CAAL Racing	BMW M5 (E39)	52	(Italy) Gabriele Marotta	5–8
(Italy) CAAL Racing	BMW M5 (E39)	52	(Italy) David Baldi	9
(Italy) CAAL Racing	BMW 550i (E60)	54	(Italy) Stefano Gabellini	1–8
(Italy) CAAL Racing	BMW 550i (E60)	54	(Italy) Mauro Cesari	9
(Italy) CAAL Racing	BMW M5 (E39)	56	(Italy) Mauro Cesari	1–8
(Italy) CAAL Racing	BMW M5 (E39)	56	(Italy) Sandro Bettini	9
(Italy) CAAL Racing	BMW M5 (E39)	58	(Italy) Roberto Papini	All
(Italy) Millennium Team (Italy) Movisport	BMW 550i (E60)	69	(Italy) Kristian Ghedina	All

== Rule changes ==
- Admission of two-doors saloon cars homologated for 4 people
- Admission of sequential gearboxes (with a 30 kg weight penalty)
- Each round consist of two races
- New scoring system

== Calendar ==
Round	Circuit/Location	Date
1	(Italy) Autodromo Internazionale "Enzo e Dino Ferrari", Imola	April 19
2	(Italy) Adria International Raceway, Adria	May 10
3	(Italy) Autodromo dell'Umbria, Magione	June 7
4	(Italy) Autodromo Internazionale del Mugello, Scarperia	June 21
5	(Portugal) Autódromo Internacional do Algarve, Portimão	August 1–2
6	(Italy) Autodromo Vallelunga "Piero Taruffi", Campagnano	September 20
7	(Italy) Autodromo Internazionale del Mugello, Scarperia	September 27
8	(Italy) Autodromo Nazionale di Monza, Monza	October 18
9	(South Africa) Kyalami Grand Prix Circuit, Midrand	December 13

International Superstars Series only
Campionato Italiano Superstars only
Both championships

== Scoring system ==
Position	1st	2nd	3rd	4th	5th	6th	7th	8th	9th	10th	Pole	Fastest Lap
Points	20	15	12	10	8	6	4	3	2	1	1	1

== Results ==
Round		Circuit	Pole position	Fastest lap	Winning driver	Winning team
1	R1	Imola	(Italy) Stefano Gabellini	(Italy) Pierluigi Martini	(Italy) Max Pigoli	(Italy) Max Pigoli Team
1	R2	Imola		(Italy) Gianni Morbidelli	(Italy) Pierluigi Martini	(Germany) Zakspeed Team
2	R1	Adria	(Italy) Stefano Gabellini	(Italy) Stefano Gabellini	(Italy) Stefano Gabellini	(Italy) CAAL Racing
2	R2	Adria		(Italy) Stefano Gabellini	(Italy) Pierluigi Martini	(Germany) Zakspeed Team
3	R1	Magione	(Italy) Stefano Gabellini	(Italy) Stefano Gabellini	(Italy) Gianni Morbidelli	(Italy) ROAL Motorsport
3	R2	Magione		(Italy) Gianni Morbidelli	(Italy) Pierluigi Martini	(Germany) Zakspeed Team
4	R1	Mugello	(Italy) Gianni Morbidelli	(Italy) Gianni Morbidelli	(Italy) Stefano Gabellini	(Italy) CAAL Racing
4	R2	Mugello		(Italy) Gianni Morbidelli	(Italy) Stefano Gabellini	(Italy) CAAL Racing
5	R1	Portimão	(Italy) Gianni Morbidelli	(Italy) Gianni Morbidelli	(Italy) Gianni Morbidelli	(Italy) ROAL Motorsport
5	R2	Portimão		(Italy) Gianni Morbidelli	(Italy) Gianni Morbidelli	(Italy) ROAL Motorsport
6	R1	Vallelunga	(Italy) Gianni Morbidelli	(Italy) Gianni Morbidelli	(Italy) Gianni Morbidelli	(Italy) ROAL Motorsport
6	R2	Vallelunga		(Italy) Gianni Morbidelli	(Italy) Gianni Morbidelli	(Italy) ROAL Motorsport
7	R1	Mugello	(Italy) Gianni Morbidelli	(Italy) Gianni Morbidelli	(Italy) Roberto Russo	(Italy) Top Run Racing
7	R2	Mugello		(Italy) Stefano Gabellini	(Italy) Kristian Ghedina	(Italy) Movisport
8	R1	Monza	(Italy) Max Pigoli	(Italy) Stefano Gabellini	(Italy) Max Pigoli	(Italy) Max Pigoli Team
8	R2	Monza		(Italy) Max Pigoli	(Italy) Gianni Morbidelli	(Italy) ROAL Motorsport
9	R1	Kyalami	(Italy) Fabrizio Armetta	(Italy) Fabrizio Armetta	(Italy) Fabrizio Armetta	(Italy) Motorzone Race Car
9	R2	Kyalami		(Italy) Luca Rangoni	(Italy) Luca Rangoni	(Italy) Audi Sport Italia

== Championship standings ==
=== Campionato Italiano Superstars – Drivers ===
Pos	Driver	IMO (Italy)		ADR (Italy)		MAG (Italy)		MUG (Italy)		ALG (Portugal)		VAL (Italy)		MUG (Italy)		MNZ (Italy)		Pts
1	(Italy) Gianni Morbidelli	2	Ret	Ret	4	1	2	**11**	12	**1**	1	**1**	1	**2**	5	9	1	197
2	(Italy) Stefano Gabellini	**5**	5	**1**	3	**3**	9	1	1	3	6	Ret	Ret	11	7	2	7	151
3	(Italy) Max Pigoli	1	2	5	7	4	4	2	4	DNS	DNS	Ret	Ret	14	Ret	**1**	2	129
4	(Italy) Roberto Papini	Ret	4	2	6	5	10	Ret	Ret	5	13	3	2	3	3	4	3	121
5	(Italy) Pierluigi Martini	Ret	1	3	1	6	1	5	2	18	17	13	3	13	Ret	13	Ret	114
6	(Italy) Kristian Ghedina	10	9	Ret	5	8	**3**	Ret	3	4	4	2	4	12	1	6	Ret	109
7	(Italy) Mauro Cesari	6	7	4	2	7	13	3	5	6	3	8	Ret	4	4	11	5	108
8	(Italy) Francesco Ascani	4	8	6	8	12	6	6	7	7	15	7	Ret	5	Ret	5	Ret	62
9	(Italy) Roberto Russo	11	Ret							8	**16**	4	12	1	2	3	Ret	61
10	(Italy) Ermanno Dionisio	Ret	6	Ret	Ret	10	5	10	8	DNS	DNS	12	Ret	6	6	7	9	37
11	(Italy) Alessandro Bernasconi	Ret	Ret	7	9	2			Ret			5		Ret		8		32
12	(Italy) Fabrizio Armetta	3	3			Ret	Ret	9	DNS	16	7	Ret	13	DNS	DNS	Ret	Ret	30
13	(Portugal) Filipe Albuquerque									2	2							30
14	(Italy) Roberto Del Castello	7	10	11	Ret	9	15					6	7	7	9			23
15	(Italy) Sandro Bettini					Ret	12	4	6									16
16	(Italy) Andrea Chiesa			10	10	Ret	11	Ret	10	9	9	9	6	15	Ret	Ret	Ret	15
17	(Italy) Roberto Sigala			9	Ret					14	10					Ret	4	13
18	(Italy) Bruno Bollini						14	Ret		12	14		5		8		**Ret**	11
19	(Italy) Nico Caldarola					14	8	8	**9**			16	9					10
20	(Italy) Alessandro Battaglin									10	5							9
21	(Italy) Walter Nudo											10	10	9	10	Ret	8	8
22	(Italy) Pierluigi Veronesi															10	6	7
23	(Italy) Roberto Benedetti					11	16					15	8	8	**Ret**			6
24	(Italy) Alessandro Cacciari			Ret	Ret			7	11	11	11							4
25	(Italy) Moreno Petrini					13	7											4
26	(Italy) Roberto Sperati										8							3
27	(Italy) Alessio Alcidi	8	**Ret**	Ret	Ret													3
28	(Italy) Ivan Benvenuti	Ret	11	8	**Ret**													3
29	(Italy) Beppe Arlotti	9																2
30	(Italy) Gabriele Marotta									13	12	11	11	10	11	12	Ret	1
31	(Italy) Massimo Pesci									17	DNS							0
	(Italy) Nicolò Piancastelli							12	DNS									0
	(Brazil) Walter Salles									15								0
	(Italy) Fabrizio Gini		Ret									14	DNS					0
Pos	Driver	IMO (Italy)		ADR (Italy)		MAG (Italy)		MUG (Italy)		ALG (Portugal)		VAL (Italy)		MUG (Italy)		MNZ (Italy)		Pts

Colour	Result
Gold	Winner
Silver	Second place
Bronze	Third place
Green	Points classification
Blue	Non-points classification
Blue	Non-classified finish (NC)
Purple	Retired, not classified (Ret)
Red	Did not qualify (DNQ)
Red	Did not pre-qualify (DNPQ)
Black	Disqualified (DSQ)
White	Did not start (DNS)
White	Withdrew (WD)
White	Race cancelled (C)
Blank	Did not practice (DNP)
Blank	Did not arrive (DNA)
Blank	Excluded (EX)

**Bold** – Pole
Italics – Fastest Lap

=== Campionato Italiano Superstars – Teams ===
Position	Team	Points
1	CAAL Racing	400
2	ROAL Motorsport	259
3	Max Pigoli Team	129
4	Zakspeed Team	114
5	Movisport	109
6	Top Run Racing	61
7	Ferlito Motors	54
8	Audi Sport Italia	46
9	Habitat Racing	46
10	Motorzone Race Car	30
11	Santucci Motorsport	29
12	Swiss Team	15
13	Vaccari Motori	10
14	Scuderia TRT	9
15	RGA Sportmanship	6
16	Gass Racing	2

=== International Superstars Series ===
Pos	Driver	IMO (Italy)		ALG (Portugal)		MUG (Italy)		MNZ (Italy)		KYA (South Africa)		Pts
1	(Italy) Gianni Morbidelli	2	Ret	**1**	1	**2**	5	9	1	5	4	123
2	(Italy) Max Pigoli	1	2	DNS	DNS	14	Ret	**1**	2	Ret	5	80
3	(Italy) Mauro Cesari	6	7	6	3	4	4	11	5	3	9	70
4	(Italy) Roberto Papini	Ret	4	5	13	3	3	4	3	11	8	67
5	(Italy) Fabrizio Armetta	3	3	16	7	DNS	DNS	Ret	Ret	1	2	65
6	(Italy) Stefano Gabellini	**5**	5	3	6	11	7	2	7			60
7	(Italy) Kristian Ghedina	10	9	4	4	12	1	6	Ret	6	Ret	55
8	(Italy) Roberto Russo	11	Ret	8	**16**	1	2	3	Ret			51
9	(Italy) Francesco Ascani	4	8	7	15	5	Ret	5	Ret	14	Ret	33
10	(Italy) Pierluigi Martini	Ret	1	18	17	13	Ret	13	Ret	4	Ret	31
11	(Portugal) Filipe Albuquerque			2	2							30
12	(Italy) Ermanno Dionisio	Ret	6	DNS	DNS	6	6	7	9	13	6	30
13	(San Marino) Christian Montanari									2	3	27
14	(Italy) Luca Rangoni									7	1	25
15	(Italy) Roberto Del Castello	7	10			7	9					11
16	(Italy) Roberto Sigala			14	10			Ret	4			11
17	(Italy) Alessandro Battaglin			10	5							9
18	(Italy) David Baldi									8	**7**	7
19	(Italy) Pierluigi Veronesi							10	6			7
20	(Italy) Andrea Chiesa			9	9	15	Ret	Ret	Ret	9	10	7
21	(Italy) Walter Nudo					9	10	Ret	8			6
22	(Italy) Roberto Sperati				8							3
23	(Italy) Roberto Benedetti					8	**Ret**					3
24	(Italy) Alessio Alcidi	8	**Ret**									3
25	(Italy) Bruno Bollini			12	14		8		**Ret**			3
26	(Italy) Alessandro Bernasconi	Ret	Ret			Ret		8				3
27	(Italy) Beppe Arlotti	9										2
28	(Italy) Gabriele Marotta			13	12	10	11	12	Ret			1
29	(Italy) Sandro Bettini									10	11	1
30	(Italy) Massimo Pesci			17	DNS							0
	(Brazil) Walter Salles			15								0
	(Italy) Nico Caldarola									12	Ret	0
	(Italy) Francesco Dracone									Ret	12	0
	(Italy) Fabrizio Gini		Ret							15	Ret	0
	(Italy) Ivan Benvenuti	Ret	11									0
	(Italy) Alessandro Cacciari			11	11							0
Pos	Driver	IMO (Italy)		ALG (Portugal)		MUG (Italy)		MNZ (Italy)		KYA (South Africa)		Pts

Colour	Result
Gold	Winner
Silver	Second place
Bronze	Third place
Green	Points classification
Blue	Non-points classification
Blue	Non-classified finish (NC)
Purple	Retired, not classified (Ret)
Red	Did not qualify (DNQ)
Red	Did not pre-qualify (DNPQ)
Black	Disqualified (DSQ)
White	Did not start (DNS)
White	Withdrew (WD)
White	Race cancelled (C)
Blank	Did not practice (DNP)
Blank	Did not arrive (DNA)
Blank	Excluded (EX)

**Bold** – Pole
Italics – Fastest Lap

=== Rookie Superstars Trophy ===
This ranking is open to drivers who have never participated in the Superstars Series or who have never scored points in previous editions of the Series (2005-2008 seasons). Points are awarded to the top three finishers

Pos	Driver	IMO (Italy)		ADR (Italy)		MAG (Italy)		MUG (Italy)		ALG (Portugal)		VAL (Italy)		MUG (Italy)		MNZ (Italy)		Pts
1	(Italy) Pierluigi Martini	0	3	3	3	2	3	2	3	0	0	0	3	0	0	0	0	22
2	(Italy) Roberto Russo	1	0							2	0	3	0	3	3	3	0	15
3	(Italy) Alessandro Bernasconi	0	0	2	2	3			0			2		0		2		11
4	(Italy) Roberto Del Castello	3	2	0	0	1	0					1	0	2	1			10
5	(Portugal) Filipe Albuquerque									3	3							6
6	(Italy) Sandro Bettini					0	0	3	2									5
7	(Italy) Andrea Chiesa			0	1	0	1	0	0	1	1	0	1	0	0	0	0	5
8	(Italy) Bruno Bollini						0	0		0	0		2		2		0	4
9	(Italy) Roberto Sigala			0	0					0	0					0	3	3
10	(Italy) Nico Caldarola					0	2	0	1			0	0					3
	(Italy) Pierluigi Veronesi															1	2	3
12	(Italy) Beppe Arlotti	2																2
	(Italy) Roberto Sperati										2							2
14	(Italy) Walter Nudo											0	0	1	0	0	1	2
	(Italy) Ivan Benvenuti	0	1	1	0													2
16	(Italy) Alessandro Cacciari			0	0			1	0	0	0							1
17	(Italy) Gabriele Marotta									0	0	0	0	0	0	0	0	0
	(Italy) Massimo Pesci									0								0
	(Italy) Nicolò Piancastelli							0										0
	(Brazil) Walter Salles									0								0
	(Italy) Fabrizio Gini		0									0						0
Pos	Driver	IMO (Italy)		ADR (Italy)		MAG (Italy)		MUG (Italy)		ALG (Portugal)		VAL (Italy)		MUG (Italy)		MNZ (Italy)		Pts
