= Gabriele Marotta =

Italian racing driver (born 1967)

- Nationality: Italian
- Born: 31 July 1967 (age 59) Rome, Italy

TCR International Series career
- Debut season: 2015
- Current team: Target Competition
- Car number: 40
- Starts: 2

Previous series
- 2010 2009 2003, 05 2000-01 1996 1991-94, 97-98 1988 1987 1986: Superstars GTSprint; Superstars Series; Formula Palmer Audi; European Touring Car Series; BPR Global GT Series; Italian Touring Car Championship French Formula Renault Turbo Championship; French Formula Ford Championship; British Formula Ford Championship

Gabriele Marotta (born 31 July 1967) is an Italian racing driver currently competing in the TCR International Series. He previously competed in the Superstars Series, Formula Palmer Audi, in various GT3 series, in the BPR Global GT Series, in the European Touring Car Series, the French Prototypes Championship, and the Italian Touring Car Championship.

== Racing career ==
Marotta began his career in 1986 in the British Formula Ford B Championship. In 1987, he switched to the French Formula Ford Championship. In 1988, he raced in the French Formula Renault Turbo B Championship. He switched to the Italian Touring Car Championship in 1991, where he raced for several years, namely for Toyota Italia and the works Alfa Romeo team Nordauto Engineering, achieving several race wins and podiums. From 1996 to 2005, he raced in several championships, including BPR Global GT Series, European Touring Car Series and Formula Palmer Audi. In 1999, he won the Coppa Italia at the wheel of a Peugeot 405 Mi16. In 2000, he won the European Touring Car Series at the wheel of a Peugeot. In 2009, Marotta switched to the Superstars Series. He finished the season 28th in the championship standings. He switched to the Superstars GTSprint championship in 2010, winning the GT4 class with a Maserati fielded by AF Corse. In July 2015, it was announced that Marotta would make his TCR International Series debut with Target Competition driving a SEAT León Cup Racer.

== Racing record ==
=== Complete TCR International Series results ===
(key) (Races in bold indicate pole position) (Races in italics indicate fastest lap)

Year	Team	Car	1	2	3	4	5	6	7	8	9	10	11	12	13	14	15	16	17	18	19	20	21	22	DC	Points
2015	Target Competition	SEAT León Cup Racer	MYS; 1	MYS; 2	CHN; 1	CHN; 2	ESP; 1	ESP; 2	POR; 1	POR; 2	ITA; 1	ITA; 2	AUT; 1	AUT; 2	RUS; 1	RUS; 2	RBR; 1; 13	RBR; 2; 10	SIN; 1	SIN; 2	THA; 1	THA; 2	MAC; 1	MAC; 2	44th	1
