= Cinquetti =

Cinquetti (pronounced [tʃiŋˈkwetti]) is an Italian surname from Verona, possibly related to the expression cinque etti 'five hundred grams'. Notable people with the surname include:

- Arnaldo Cinquetti (born 1953), Italian swimmer
- Gigliola Cinquetti (born 1947), Italian singer, songwriter and television presenter

== See also ==
- Ciao Bella Cinquetti
- Cinguetti
- Cinquini
