= Bruno Bollini =

French footballer (1933–2015)

Personal information
- Full name: Bruneau René Bollini
- Date of birth: 14 September 1933
- Place of birth: 20th arrondissement of Paris, France
- Date of death: 20 February 2015 (aged 81)
- Place of death: Sevran, France
- Height: 1.78 m (5 ft 10 in)
- Position: Defender

Youth career
- –1951: USO Clichy

Senior career*
Years	Team	Apps	(Gls)
1951–1956	Stade Français	74	(17)
1956–1966	RC France	346	(34)
1966–1968	Amicale de Lucé		
1968–1970	Chantilly		

International career
1957–1961	France	3	
1962	France B	1	(0)
- * Club domestic league appearances and goals

Bruneau René Bollini (14 September 1933 – 20 February 2015) was a French footballer who played as a defender for RC France and the French national team from 1956 until 1966. He also played a key role in the foundation of Union Nationale des Footballeurs Professionnels (UNFP), of which he was secretary for several years.

== Early life and education ==
Bruno Bollini was born in the 20th arrondissement of Paris on 14 September 1933, as the son of an Italian plasterer, who died in 1939, so he grew up with his mother and two brothers in Clichy-sous-Bois.

Bollini began his football career in the youth ranks of USO Clichy, a FSGT club, while he was studying industrial design at the Saint-Ouen vocational school. He carried out his mandatory military service with Just Fontaine in the Bataillon de Joinville.

== Club career ==
In 1951, the 18-year-old Bollini signed an amateur license with Stade Français, where he soon became a professional in 1953. Having initially played in his preferred role of left interior, he soon became a left winger, and following the arrival of Joseph Mercier as coach, he was used as wing-half, featuring alongside the likes of Kees Rijvers and René Gaulon. His first professional season at Racing (1953–54) ended in relegated to Ligue 2. In the middle of the 1956–57 season, he was transferred to RC Paris for twelve million francs, thus returning to the top flight.

During his time at Racing, the club became an ultra-attacking powerhouse, finishing as the team with the most goals scored in 1956, 1959, 1960, 1961, and 1962, and finishing as league runners-up twice, in 1961 and 1962. He stayed at Racing for a full decade, from 1956 until 1966, when he joined amateur side Amicale de Lucé, with whom he played for two years. In 1968, Bollini went to another amateur club Chantilly, where he retired in 1970, aged 37. During his 13 professional seasons at Stade Français and Racing, he never received any warnings. In total, he scored 28 goals in 256 Ligue 1 matches.

== International career ==
On 27 November 1957, the 24-year-old Bollini made his international debut for France in a friendly against England at Wembley Stadium, in which he missed a clear opportunity to score in a 4–0 loss. He was thus not selected for the 1958 FIFA World Cup in Sweden, during which he toured Russia with Racing after marrying his wife. In total, he earned three caps for France, each in a different year (1957, 1958, and 1961).

On 6 May 1962, Bollini played for France B in a friendly against Italy B at the Stade Municipal de Toulouse, which ended in a 2–2 draw.

== Founder of the UNFP ==
In 1961, Bollini was one of the founders of the Union Nationale des Footballeurs Professionnels (UNFP), where he assisted Michel Hidalgo from 1969. He then served the entity as its general secretary, a position that he used to achieve salary and full-time contracts for the French professional footballers, thus giving a few decades of advancement in that department in comparison with other countries. In 1998, he stated that "in the 1960s, I fought so that footballers could monetize their talent. Today, with transfers, they have become slaves again, even if it is a gilded slavery".

From 1973 to 1980, Bollini was the sporting director of Paris FC, which achieved promotion to the top flight for the 1979–80 season, which ended in relegation. At the start of the 2000–01 season, Bollini and fellow former Racing player Bolek Ugorenko agreed to be honorary presidents of the new Ciel et Blanc association, which had been created to encourage and support Racing.

== Death ==
Devaux died in Sevran on 20 February 2015, at the age of 81.

== Honours ==
RC France

- Ligue 1:
  - Runner-up (2): 1960–61 and 1961–62
