= Filipe Albuquerque =

Portuguese racing driver (born 1985)

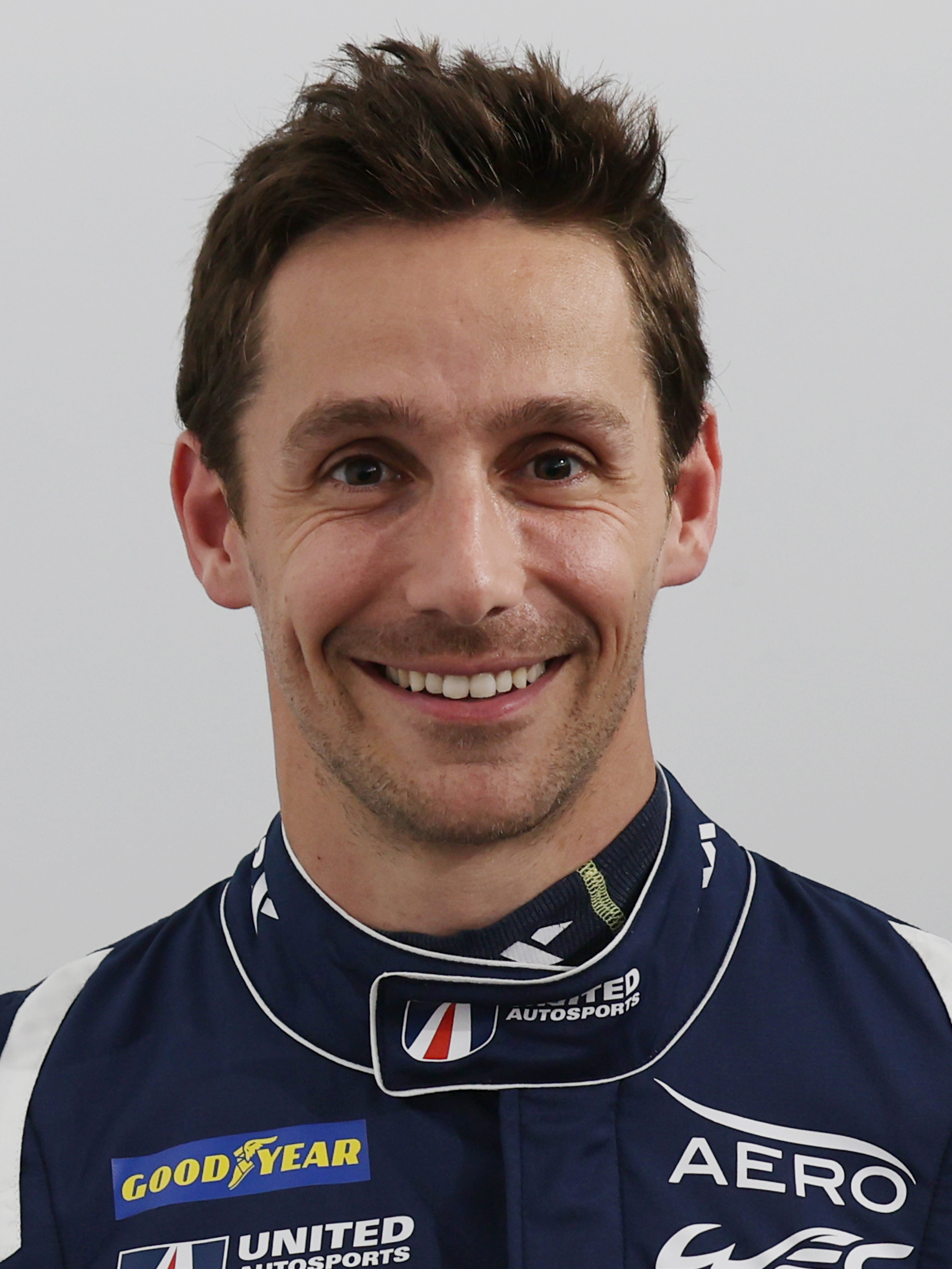
- Albuquerque in 2022
- Nationality: (Portugal) Portuguese
- Born: Filipe Miguel Delgadinho Albuquerque; 13 June 1985 (age 41) Coimbra, Portugal

IMSA career
- Debut season: 2014
- Current team: Cadillac Wayne Taylor Racing
- Categorisation: FIA Platinum
- Car number: 10
- Former teams: Audi Sport Team Joest, Action Express Racing, United Autosports
- Starts: 89
- Wins: 14
- Poles: 10
- Best finish: 1st in 2019–20

Previous series
- 2011–2013 2009–2010 2007–2009 2007–2008 2007 2006 2005–06 2005 2005: DTM; Superstars Series; A1 Grand Prix; Formula Renault 3.5 Series; GP2 Series; Formula Renault NEC; Formula Renault Eurocup; Formula Renault Germany; Spanish F3 Championship

Championship titles
- 2019–20 2020 2017 2006 2006: FIA Endurance Trophy for LMP2 Drivers; European Le Mans Series; North American Endurance Cup; Formula Renault Eurocup; Formula Renault NEC

Awards
- 2006: Red Bull Junior of the Year

Filipe Miguel Delgadinho Araújo Albuquerque (né Albuquerque; born 13 June 1985) is a Portuguese professional racing driver, currently driving a Cadillac V-Series.R in the IMSA SportsCar Championship for Wayne Taylor Racing.

A former Audi factory driver in DTM and LMP1, Albuquerque has been most successful in LMP2, winning the FIA World Endurance Championship, European Le Mans Series and 24 Hours of Le Mans for United Autosports in 2020. Additionally, he is a three-time IMSA runner-up and two-time overall winner of the 24 Hours of Daytona in 2018 and 2021.

== Career ==
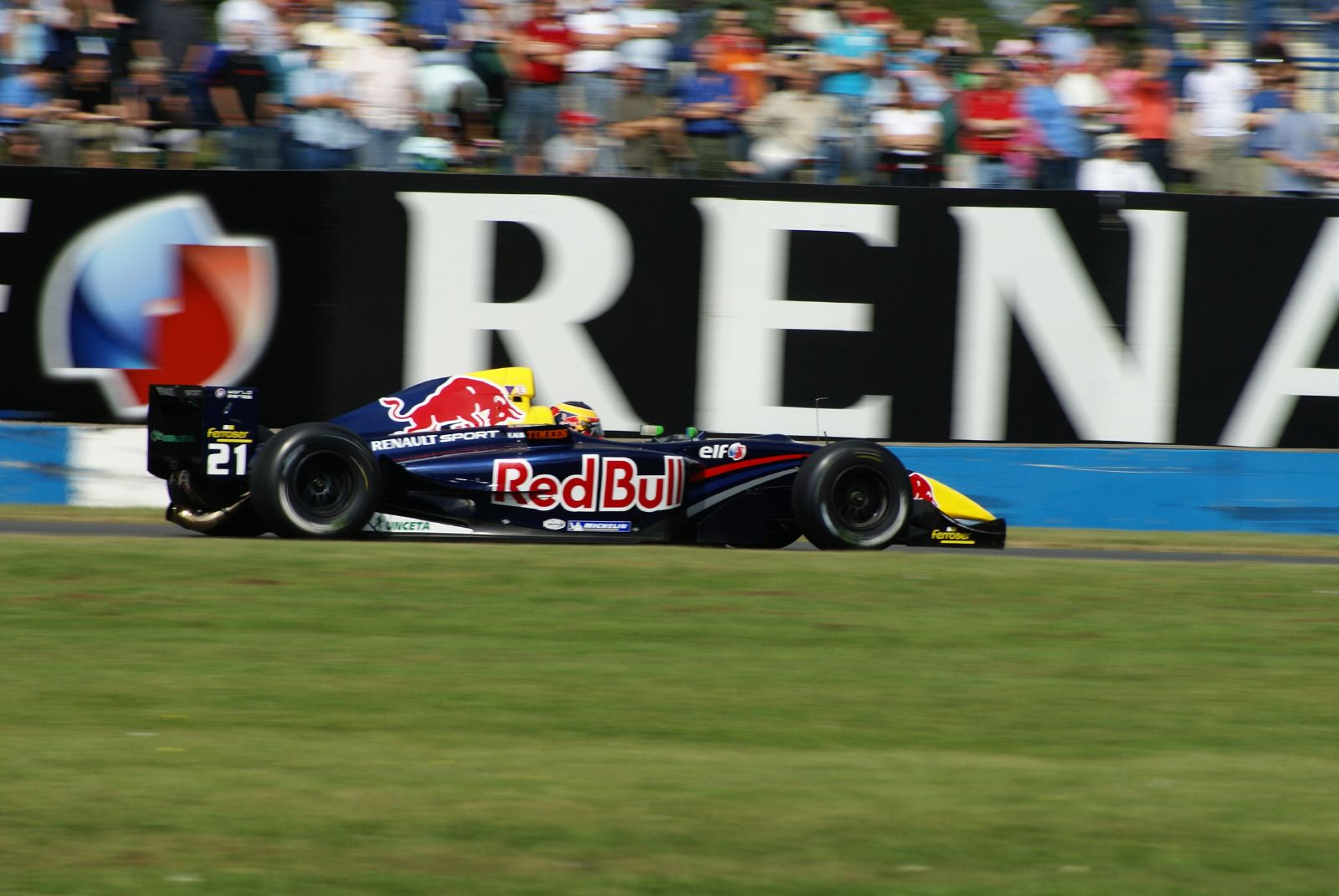
Albuquerque driving for Epsilon Euskadi at the Donington Park round of the 2007 Formula Renault 3.5 Series season.

Albuquerque started his motor racing career in karting in 1993, "I started karting as a joke, but it quickly became more and more serious" Albuquerque recalled, "It's really hard to get sponsorship to go racing. Without Red Bull I would probably be at home studying" he added. He went on to win two national karting titles before moving up to Spanish Formula Three with the help of Red Bull. He has built a strong reputation in endurance racing, winning the LMP2 title in the 2019-20 FIA World Endurance Championship, the LMP2 class at the 24 Hours of Le Mans in 2020, and overall victories at the 24 Hours of Daytona in 2018 and 2021. But later, Albuquerque was moved up to the Formula Renault, "a driver was fired from Red Bull" The Portuguese commented, "and I was told I would do the Renault 2.0-litre race in Zolder." Albuquerque was the fastest driver for the team during the race and so became the permanent replacement and was also called into the Formula Renault German series.

Albuquerque finished sixth in the Spanish Formula Three championship, fifth in the Formula Renault Eurocup and third in the Formula Renault Germany series, finishing as a highest positioned rookie in all three championships. In 2006, Albuquerque raced in two championships, the Formula Renault Eurocup championship and the North European Formula Renault championship, where he won the Drivers' title in both series.

For 2007, Albuquerque entered the Formula Renault 3.5 Series championship with the Epsilon Euskadi team, and finished fourth in the drivers' championship. He was also chosen as replacement of Ernesto Viso in the Silverstone round of GP2 Series, following the Venezuelan's accident at Magny-Cours. Albuquerque remained in Formula Renault 3.5 for 2008, but only competed in four races, as he focussed on the A1 Grand Prix series.

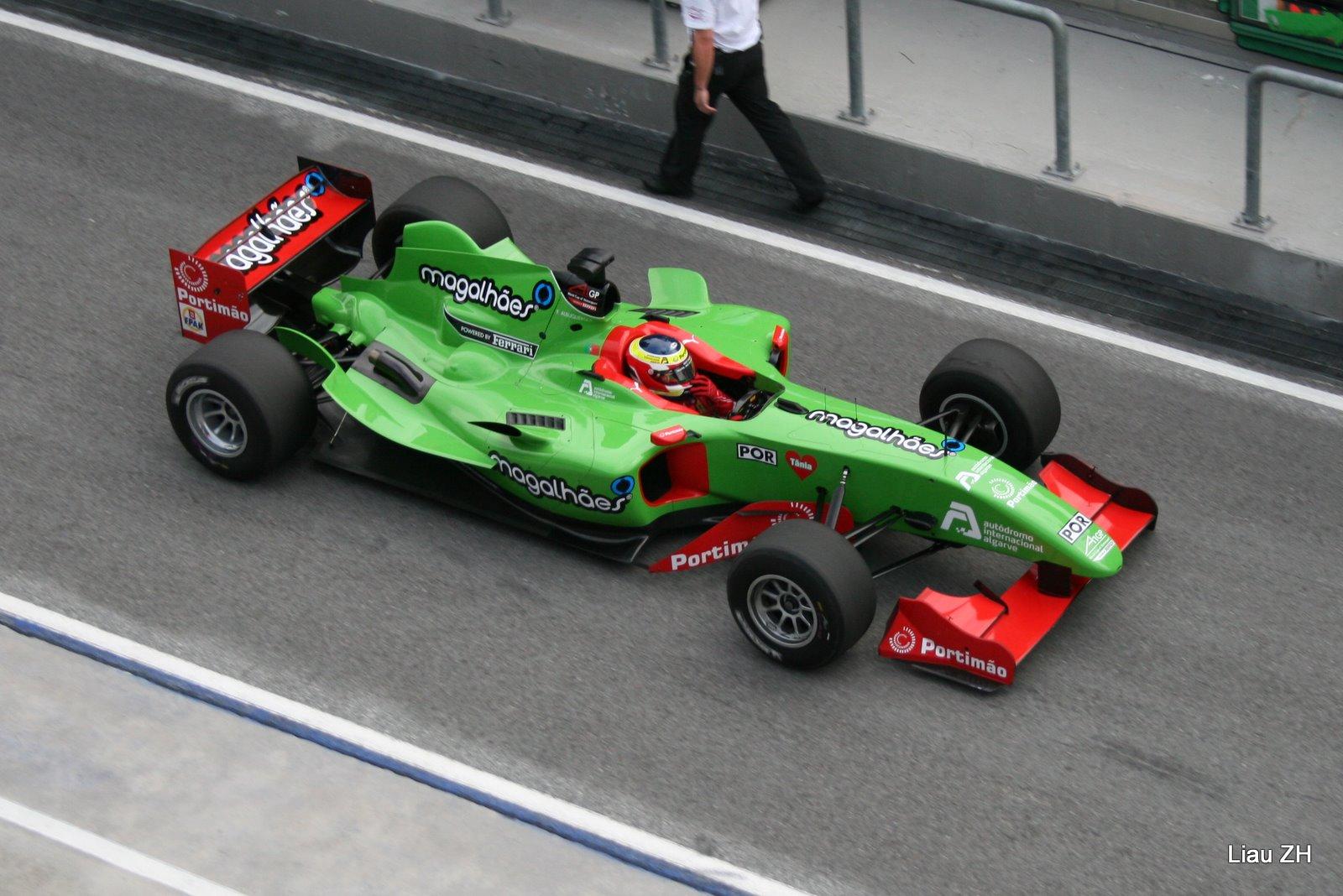
Albuquerque driving for A1 Team Portugal in the 2008–09 A1 Grand Prix season.

Albuquerque made his A1 GP début in the 2007–08 season, replacing João Urbano at A1 Team Portugal mid-season. He finished every race he started in the points, including three podium finishes, and the team finished eleventh in that year's championship. He returned for the 2008–09 season as the team's sole driver, and finished third overall after a campaign which saw him take Portugal's first series win, in China. He was retained for the 2009–10 season, but the series ran into financial trouble and the new season was cancelled before it began.

With his single-seater career prospects looking bleak, Albuquerque moved to Italian GT racing when it became apparent that the A1 GP series had died. He moved to the Italian GT3 Championship for part of the 2009 season, driving an Audi R8 LMS. He also made an appearance at one of the race meetings for the 2009 Superstars Series season, a touring car championship, and finished second in both races, driving an Audi RS4. For 2010, he competed in the Italian GT3 Championship full-time, finishing as joint-runner up in the series with his Audi R8 LMS co-driver Marco Bonanomi, behind champion Gianluca Roda in a Porsche 997 GT3. He also made another Superstars guest appearance for Audi, winning one of the races at his home event, held at the Autódromo Internacional do Algarve.

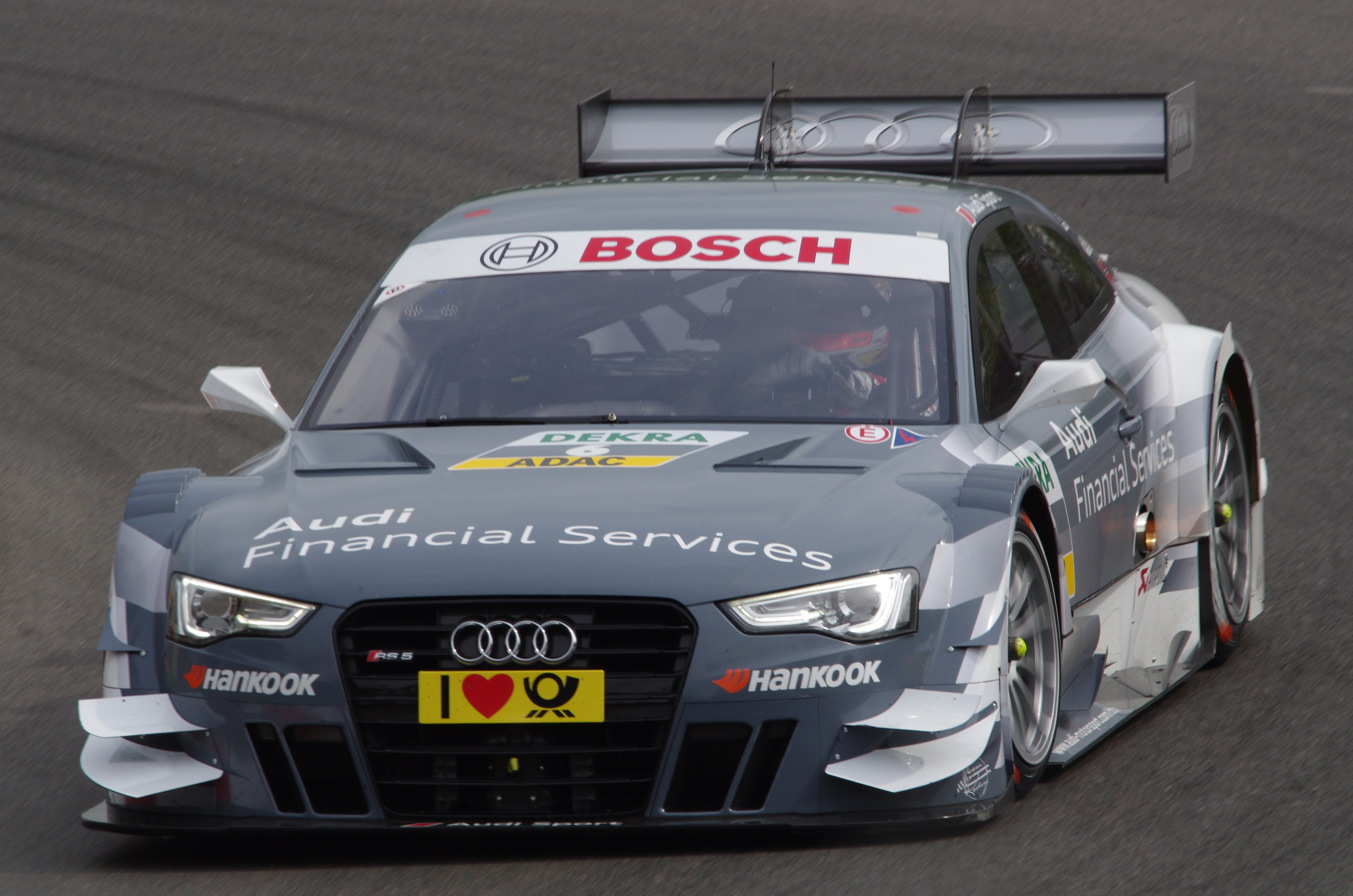
Albuquerque driving at Brands Hatch during the 2013 Deutsche Tourenwagen Masters season.

Albuquerque competed in the 2010 Race of Champions event at Düsseldorf. He was partnered with Portuguese countryman Álvaro Parente in the Cup of Nations, where they were knocked out in the group stage. In the individual Champion of Champions competition, however, Albuquerque scored a surprise victory, defeating Formula One champion Sebastian Vettel in the semi-final and multiple World Rally Champion Sébastien Loeb in the final.

In 2011, Albuquerque competed in the Deutsche Tourenwagen Masters, driving a 2008-spec Audi A4, also entering the Blancpain Endurance Series in an Audi R8 entered by Belgian team WRT, which finished second overall on the final standings.

In 2013, Albuquerque made his debut in the 24 Hours of Daytona driving an Audi R8 Grand-Am for Alex Job Racing in the GT class. He won the class as part of an Audi 1–2 finish.

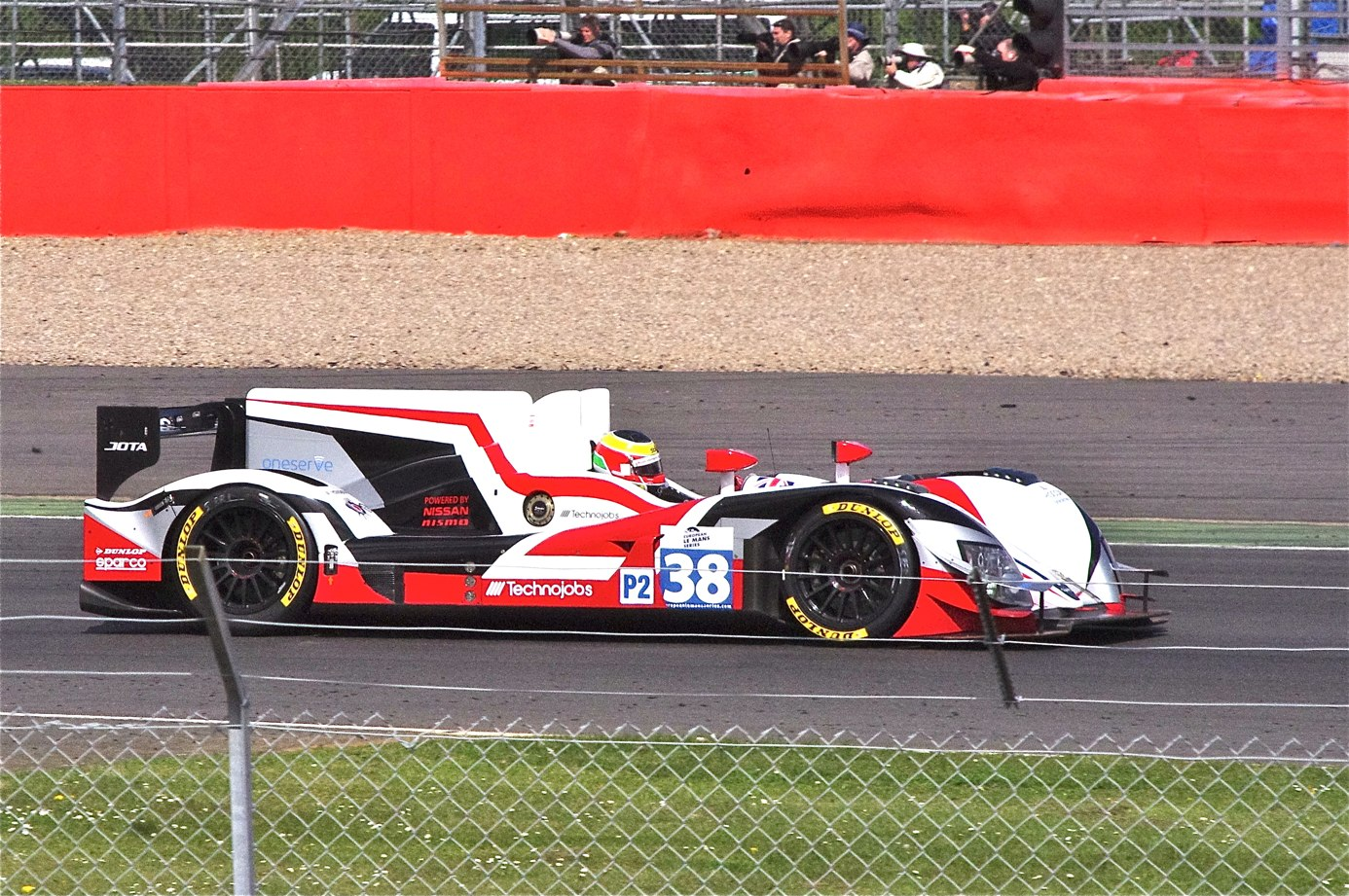
Albuquerque at Silverstone in his first European Le Mans Series race.

In 2014, Albuquerque was no longer racing in the Deutsche Tourenwagen Masters. He raced in the European Le Mans Series in the LMP2 category and finished as runner up on the drivers' standings. He was also a part of Audi's official team for the 2014 24 Hours of Le Mans.

Albuquerque nearly won the 2017 24 Hours of Daytona, leading the final stages of the race before contact with Ricky Taylor caused him to spin out with seven minutes to go; Albuquerque subsequently ran down Taylor on the last lap of the race but was unable to make the pass, losing by 0.671 seconds.

== Highlights ==
- FIA WEC (LMP2): Champion (2019–20)
- 24 Hours of Le Mans: LMP2 Winner (2020)
- European Le Mans Series: Champion (2020)
- Race of Champions: Winner (2010)
- Eurocup Formula Renault 2.0: Champion (2006)
- Formula Renault 2.0 NEC: Champion (2006)
- 24 Hours of Daytona: Overall winner (2018 and 2021), GTD Winner (2013)
- Italian GT Championship – GT3: 3rd (2010)
- Blancpain Endurance Series – GT3 Pro Cup : 3rd (2011)
- North American Endurance Cup: Champion (2017)

== Racing record ==
=== Career summary ===
Season	Series	Team	Races	Wins	Poles	F/Laps	Podiums	Points	Position
2005	Formula Renault 2.0 Germany	Motopark Oschersleben	14	4	6	5	8	273	**3rd**
2005	Eurocup Formula Renault 2.0	Motopark Academy	14	0	0	0	2	63	5th
2005	Spanish Formula 3 Championship	Racing Engineering	12	1	1	0	3	52	6th
2006	Eurocup Formula Renault 2.0	Motopark Academy	14	4	4	1	4	99	**1st**
2006	Formula Renault 2.0 NEC	Motopark Academy	14	4	2	1	10	312	**1st**
2007	Formula Renault 3.5 Series	Epsilon Euskadi	17	1	0	1	2	81	4th
2007	GP2 Series	Racing Engineering	2	0	0	0	0	0	32nd
2007	GP2 Series	Arden International	2	0	0	0	0	0	32nd
2007–08	A1 Grand Prix	A1 Team Portugal	8	0	0	0	3	59	11th
2008	Formula Renault 3.5 Series	Epsilon Euskadi	4	0	0	0	0	12	21st
2008–09	A1 Grand Prix	A1 Team Portugal	14	1	0	2	6	92	**3rd**
2009	Italian GT Championship	Audi Sport Italia	2	1	0	0	2	34	18th
2009	International Superstars Series	Audi Sport Italia	2	0	0	0	2	30	11th
2010	Italian GT Championship	Audi Sport Italia	14	2	1	1	9	144	**2nd**
2010	International Superstars Series	Audi Sport Italia	2	1	0	0	1	20	13th
2011	Deutsche Tourenwagen Masters	Team Rosberg	10	0	0	0	1	9	12th
2011	Blancpain Endurance Series	Belgian Audi Club Team WRT	5	0	1	0	3	74	**3rd**
2011	Italian GT Championship	Audi Sport Italia	2	2	1	1	9	30	13th
2012	Deutsche Tourenwagen Masters	Team Rosberg	10	0	0	0	0	26	11th
2012	Blancpain Endurance Series	Belgian Audi Club Team WRT	1	0	0	0	1	15	20th
2012	Global RallyCross Championship	Pastrana 199 Racing	1	0	0	0	0	1	24th
2013	Deutsche Tourenwagen Masters	Team Rosberg	10	0	0	0	0	16	18th
2013	Rolex Sports Car Series – GTD	Audi Sport Customer Racing/AJR	3	1	0	0	1	74	23rd
2013	FIA GT Series	Belgian Audi Club Team WRT	2	0	0	0	0	0	NC
2013	International GT Open – GTS	Belgian Audi Club Team WRT	2	0	0	0	0	0	NC
2013	International GTSprint Series	MTM Motorsport	2	0	0	0	2	36	27th
2014	European Le Mans Series – LMP2	Jota Sport	5	1	4	1	3	74	**2nd**
2014	FIA World Endurance Championship – LMP1	Audi Sport Team Joest	2	0	0	0	0	8	12th
2014	24 Hours of Le Mans – LMP1	Audi Sport Team Joest	1	0	0	0	0	N/A	DNF
2014	United SportsCar Championship – GTD	Flying Lizard Motorsports	2	0	0	0	0	57	42nd
2015	European Le Mans Series – LMP2	Jota Sport	5	1	4	1	3	74	**3rd**
2015	FIA World Endurance Championship – LMP1	Audi Sport Team Joest	2	0	0	0	0	24	12th
2015	24 Hours of Le Mans – LMP1	Audi Sport Team Joest	1	0	0	0	0	N/A	7th
2015	United SportsCar Championship – PC	Starworks Motorsport	1	0	0	0	0	27	33rd
2016	FIA World Endurance Championship – LMP2	RGR Sport by Morand	9	2	1	0	7	166	**2nd**
2016	24 Hours of Le Mans – LMP2	RGR Sport by Morand	1	0	0	0	0	N/A	10th
2016	Italian GT Championship	Audi Sport Italia	12	2	1	1	6	126.5	**3rd**
2016	Blancpain GT Series Endurance Cup	Belgian Audi Club Team WRT	4	0	0	0	1	19	16th
2016	IMSA SportsCar Championship – Prototype	Action Express Racing	4	1	0	0	2	88	18th
2017	European Le Mans Series – LMP2	United Autosports	6	2	0	0	3	98	**2nd**
2017	24 Hours of Le Mans – LMP2	United Autosports	1	0	0	0	0	N/A	4th
2017	IMSA SportsCar Championship – Prototype	Mustang Sampling Racing	4	1	0	1	3	126	13th
2017	FIA World Endurance Championship – LMP2	Vaillante Rebellion	1	0	0	0	1	18	22nd
2018	IMSA SportsCar Championship – Prototype	Mustang Sampling Racing	9	2	0	0	2	249	6th
2018	European Le Mans Series – LMP2	United Autosports	5	2	0	0	3	53.5	6th
2018	24 Hours of Le Mans – LMP2	United Autosports	1	0	0	0	0	N/A	DNF
2018	Stock Car Brasil	Full Time Sports	1	0	0	0	1	0	NC†
2019	IMSA SportsCar Championship – DPi	Mustang Sampling Racing	10	1	0	0	2	258	7th
2019	European Le Mans Series – LMP2	United Autosports	5	1	2	0	2	63	6th
2019	24 Hours of Le Mans – LMP2	United Autosports	1	0	0	0	0	N/A	4th
2019–20	FIA World Endurance Championship – LMP2	United Autosports	8	4	4	0	6	190	**1st**
2020	European Le Mans Series – LMP2	United Autosports	5	3	4	0	5	109	**1st**
2020	24 Hours of Le Mans – LMP2	United Autosports	1	1	1	0	1	N/A	**1st**
2020	IMSA SportsCar Championship – DPi	Whelen Engineering Racing	3	0	0	0	1	80	19th
2021	IMSA SportsCar Championship – DPi	Konica Minolta Acura	11	3	3	0	7	3396	**2nd**
2021	FIA World Endurance Championship – LMP2	United Autosports USA	5	2	2	1	2	84	5th
2021	24 Hours of Le Mans – LMP2	United Autosports USA	1	0	0	0	0	N/A	18th
2022	IMSA SportsCar Championship – DPi	Konica Minolta Acura	10	4	3	1	5	3346	**2nd**
2022	FIA World Endurance Championship – LMP2	United Autosports USA	6	0	1	0	0	50	9th
2022	24 Hours of Le Mans – LMP2	United Autosports USA	1	0	0	0	0	N/A	10th
2022	Stock Car Brasil	Eurofarma RC	1	0	0	0	0	0	NC†
2023	IMSA SportsCar Championship – GTP	Wayne Taylor Racing with Andretti Autosport	9	0	2	1	3	2712	**2nd**
2023	FIA World Endurance Championship – LMP2	United Autosports	5	1	1	1	2	78	8th
2023	24 Hours of Le Mans – LMP2	United Autosports	1	0	0	0	0	N/A	11th
2023	European Le Mans Series – LMP2 Pro-Am	United Autosports USA	1	0	0	0	1	15	19th
2023–24	Asian Le Mans Series – LMP2	99 Racing	2	0	2	0	0	2	18th
2024	IMSA SportsCar Championship – GTP	Wayne Taylor Racing with Andretti	9	1	1	1	2	2550	6th
2024	IMSA SportsCar Championship – LMP2	United Autosports USA	1	0	0	0	0	292	41st
2024	European Le Mans Series – LMP2 Pro-Am	United Autosports	1	0	0	0	0	8	15th
2025	IMSA SportsCar Championship – GTP	Cadillac Wayne Taylor Racing	9	0	0	0	3	2626	6th
2025	European Le Mans Series – LMP2	Nielsen Racing	6	0	1	0	1	46	5th
2026	IMSA SportsCar Championship – GTP	Cadillac Wayne Taylor Racing	9	1	0	0	2	2448	11th

^{†} As Albuquerque was a guest driver, he was ineligible for points.

=== Complete Formula Renault 2.0 Germany/NEC results ===
(key) (Races in bold indicate pole position) (Races in italics indicate fastest lap)

Year	Entrant	1	2	3	4	5	6	7	8	9	10	11	12	13	14	15	16	DC	Points
2005	Motopark Oschersleben	OSC; 1	OSC; 2	HOC; 1; 3	HOC; 2; 3	SAC; 1; 11	SAC; 2; 12	ASS; 1; 8	**ASS**; **2**; 1	NÜR; 1; 9	NÜR; 2; 5	**OSC**; **1**; 1	**OSC**; **2**; 2	LAU; 1; 3	**LAU**; **2**; 1	**OSC**; **1**; 1	**OSC**; **2**; 12	3rd	273
2006	Motopark Academy	OSC; 1; 7	OSC; 2; 1	SPA; 1; 6	SPA; 2; 15	NÜR; 1; 2	NÜR; 2; 2	ZAN; 1; 4	ZAN; 2; 3	OSC; 1; 2	**OSC**; **2**; 1	ASS; 1	ASS; 2	**AND**; **1**; 1	AND; 2; 2	SAL; 1; 2	SAL; 2; 1	1st	312

=== Complete Eurocup Formula Renault 2.0 results ===
(key) (Races in bold indicate pole position) (Races in italics indicate fastest lap)

Year	Team	1	2	3	4	5	6	7	8	9	10	11	12	13	14	15	16	Pos	Points
2005	Motopark Academy	ZOL; 1 Ret	ZOL; 2; 12	VAL; 1; 11	VAL; 2; 16	LMS; 1	LMS; 2	BIL; 1; 4	BIL; 2; 8	OSC; 1; 3	OSC; 2; 5	DON; 1 Ret	DON; 2; 4	EST; 1; 4	EST; 2; 2	MNZ; 1; 4	MNZ; 2 Ret	5th	63
2006	Motopark Academy	ZOL; 1; 9	ZOL; 2; 6	IST; 1; 28†	IST; 2; 5	MIS; 1; 6	MIS; 2; 4	**NÜR**; **1**; 1	NÜR; 2; 1	DON; 1; 15	DON; 2; 4	LMS; 1; 11	LMS; 2 Ret	**CAT**; **1**; 1	CAT; 2; 1			1st	99

=== Complete Spanish Formula Three Championship results ===
(key) (Races in bold indicate pole position) (Races in italics indicate fastest lap)

Year	Entrant	Class	1	2	3	4	5	6	7	8	9	10	11	12	13	14	15	DC	Points
2005	Racing Engineering	A	JAR; 1; 9	JAR; 2; 5	VAL; 1; 17†	VAL; 2; 13	ALB	EST; 1; 3	EST; 2; 5	**ALB**; **1**; 3	**ALB**; **2**; 4	VAL; 1	VAL; 2	JER; 1; 4	JER; 2; 9	CAT; 1; 1	CAT; 2 Ret	6th	41

=== Complete Formula Renault 3.5 Series results ===
(key) (Races in bold indicate pole position) (Races in italics indicate fastest lap)

Year	Entrant	1	2	3	4	5	6	7	8	9	10	11	12	13	14	15	16	17	DC	Points
2007	Epsilon Euskadi	MNZ; 1; 4	MNZ; 2; 6	NÜR; 1; 5	NÜR; 2; 2	MON; 1; 11	HUN; 1; 1	HUN; 2; 8	SPA; 1; 12	SPA; 2; 4	DON; 1; 15	DON; 2; 6	MAG; 1 Ret	MAG; 2; 25	EST; 1; 5	EST; 2; 5	CAT; 1; 13	CAT; 2; 5	4th	81
2008	Epsilon Euskadi	MNZ; 1	MNZ; 2	SPA; 1	SPA; 2	MON; 1	SIL; 1	SIL; 2	HUN; 1	HUN; 2	NÜR; 1	NÜR; 2	BUG; 1	BUG; 2	EST; 1; 10	EST; 2; 9	CAT; 1; 4	CAT; 2; 9	21st	12

=== Complete GP2 Series results ===
(key) (Races in bold indicate pole position) (Races in italics indicate fastest lap)

Year	Entrant	1	2	3	4	5	6	7	8	9	10	11	12	13	14	15	16	17	18	19	20	21	DC	Points
2007	Racing Engineering	BHR; FEA	BHR; SPR	CAT; FEA	CAT; SPR	MON; FEA	MAG; FEA	MAG; SPR	SIL; FEA; 15	SIL; SPR; 14	NÜR; FEA	NÜR; SPR	HUN; FEA	HUN; SPR	IST; FEA	IST; SPR	MNZ; FEA	MNZ; SPR	SPA; FEA	SPA; SPR			32nd	0
2007	Arden International																				VAL; FEA; 10	VAL; SPR; 10	32nd	0

=== Complete A1 Grand Prix results ===
(key) (Races in bold indicate pole position) (Races in italics indicate fastest lap)

Year	Entrant	1	2	3	4	5	6	7	8	9	10	11	12	13	14	15	16	17	18	19	20	DC	Points
2007–08	Portugal	NED; SPR	NED; FEA	CZE; SPR	CZE; FEA	MYS; SPR	MYS; FEA	CHN; SPR	CHN; FEA	NZL; SPR	NZL; FEA	AUS; SPR	AUS; FEA	RSA; SPR; 7	RSA; FEA; 3	MEX; SPR; 6	MEX; FEA; 7	CHN; SPR; 3	CHN; FEA; 2	GBR; SPR; 6	GBR; SPR; 7	11th	59
2008–09	Portugal	NED; SPR; 9	NED; FEA; Ret	CHN; SPR; 6	CHN; FEA; 1	MYS; SPR; 4	MYS; FEA; 2	NZL; SPR; 6	NZL; FEA; 3	RSA; SPR; 2	RSA; FEA; 5	POR; SPR; 3	POR; FEA; 2	GBR; SPR; 5	GBR; SPR; 5							3rd	92

=== Complete Deutsche Tourenwagen Masters results ===
(key) (Races in bold indicate pole position) (Races in italics indicate fastest lap)

Year	Team	Car	1	2	3	4	5	6	7	8	9	10	Pos.	Pts
2011	Team Rosberg	Audi A4 DTM 2008	HOC; 17	ZAN; Ret	SPL; 12	LAU; 8	NOR; 16	NÜR; 9	BRH; 11	OSC; Ret	VAL; 2	HOC; 10	12th	9
2012	Team Rosberg	Audi A5 DTM	HOC; 10	LAU; 9	BRH; 10	SPL; 8	NOR; 11	NÜR; 8	ZAN; 15†	OSC; 9	VAL; 4	HOC; 11	11th	26
2013	Team Rosberg	Audi RS5 DTM	HOC; 16	BRH; 17	SPL; 17	LAU; 18	NOR; 12	MSC; 13	NÜR; 11	OSC; 4	ZAN; 8	HOC; Ret	18th	16

=== Complete 24 Hours of Daytona results ===
Year	Team	Co-drivers	Car	Class	Laps	Pos.	Class pos.
2013	(United States) Audi Sport Customer Racing/AJR	(United Kingdom) Oliver Jarvis (Italy) Edoardo Mortara (South Africa) Dion von Moltke	Audi R8 LMS	GT	678	9th	**1st**
2014	(United States) Flying Lizard Motorsports	(United States) Seth Neiman (South Africa) Dion von Moltke (United Kingdom) Alessandro Latif	Audi R8 LMS	GTD	661	22nd	5th
2015	(United States) Starworks Motorsport	(Netherlands) Renger van der Zande (Germany) Mirco Schultis (United States) Mike Hedlund (Venezuela) Alex Popow	Oreca FLM09-Chevrolet	PC	299	DNF	DNF
2016	(United States) Action Express Racing	(Brazil) Christian Fittipaldi (Portugal) João Barbosa (United States) Scott Pruett	Chevrolet Corvette DP	P	731	4th	4th
2017	(United States) Mustang Sampling Racing	(Portugal) João Barbosa (Brazil) Christian Fittipaldi	Cadillac DPi-V.R	P	659	**2nd**	**2nd**
2018	(United States) Mustang Sampling Racing	(Portugal) João Barbosa (Brazil) Christian Fittipaldi	Cadillac DPi-V.R	P	808	**1st**	**1st**
2019	(United States) Mustang Sampling Racing	(Portugal) João Barbosa (Brazil) Christian Fittipaldi	Cadillac DPi-V.R	DPi	573	9th	7th
2020	(United States) Whelen Engineering Racing	(United Kingdom) Mike Conway (Brazil) Pipo Derani (Brazil) Felipe Nasr	Cadillac DPi-V.R	DPi	822	8th	8th
2021	(United States) Konica Minolta Acura ARX-05	(United States) Ricky Taylor (Brazil) Hélio Castroneves (United States) Alexander Rossi	Acura ARX-05	DPi	807	**1st**	**1st**
2022	(United States) Konica Minolta Acura	(United States) Alexander Rossi (United Kingdom) Will Stevens (United States) Ricky Taylor	Acura ARX-05	DPi	761	**2nd**	**2nd**
2023	(United States) Wayne Taylor Racing with Andretti Autosport	(Switzerland) Louis Delétraz (New Zealand) Brendon Hartley (United States) Ricky Taylor	Acura ARX-06	GTP	783	**2nd**	**2nd**
2024	(United States) Wayne Taylor Racing with Andretti	(Sweden) Marcus Ericsson (New Zealand) Brendon Hartley (United States) Ricky Taylor	Acura ARX-06	GTP	601	43rd	9th
2025	(United States) Cadillac Wayne Taylor Racing	(New Zealand) Brendon Hartley (United Kingdom) Will Stevens (United States) Ricky Taylor	Cadillac V-Series.R	GTP	780	5th	5th
2026	(United States) Cadillac Wayne Taylor Racing	(United Kingdom) Will Stevens (United States) Ricky Taylor	Cadillac V-Series.R	GTP	629	50th	11th

=== Complete FIA World Endurance Championship results ===
Year	Entrant	Class	Chassis	Engine	1	2	3	4	5	6	7	8	9	Rank	Points
2014	Audi Sport Team Joest	LMP1	Audi R18 e-tron quattro	Audi TDI 4.0 L Turbo V6 (Hybrid Diesel)	SIL	SPA; 6	LMS; Ret	COA	FUJ	SHA	BHR	SÃO		22nd	8
2015	Audi Sport Team Joest	LMP1	Audi R18 e-tron quattro	Audi TDI 4.0 L Turbo V6 (Hybrid Diesel)	SIL	SPA; 4	LMS; 7	NÜR	COA	FUJ	SHA	BHR		12th	24
2016	RGR Sport by Morand	LMP2	Ligier JS P2	Nissan VK45DE 4.5 L V8	**SIL**; 1	SPA; 4	LMS; 6	NÜR; 2	**MEX**; 1	COA; 2	FUJ; 2	SHA; 3	BHR; 2	2nd	166
2017	Vaillante Rebellion	LMP2	Oreca 07	Gibson GK428 4.2 L V8	SIL	SPA	LMS	NÜR; 2	MEX	COA	FUJ	SHA	BHR	22nd	18
2019–20	United Autosports	LMP2	Oreca 07	Gibson GK428 4.2 L V8	SIL; Ret	FUJ; 3	SHA; 3	**BHR**; 1	COA; 1	**SPA**; 1	**LMS**; 1	**BHR**; 4		1st	190
2021	United Autosports USA	LMP2	Oreca 07	Gibson GK428 4.2 L V8	**SPA**; 1	ALG	MNZ; 1	LMS; 10	BHR; 4	**BHR**; 4				5th	84
2022	United Autosports USA	LMP2	Oreca 07	Gibson GK428 4.2 L V8	SEB; 7	SPA; 5	LMS; 7	**MNZ**; 13	FUJ; 7	BHR; 6				9th	50
2023	United Autosports	LMP2	Oreca 07	Gibson GK428 4.2 L V8	SEB; 1	ALG	SPA; 5	LMS; 8	MNZ	**FUJ**; 2	BHR; 9			8th	78

=== Complete 24 Hours of Le Mans results ===
Year	Team	Co-Drivers	Car	Class	Laps	Pos.	Class Pos.
2014	(Germany) Audi Sport Team Joest	(Italy) Marco Bonanomi (United Kingdom) Oliver Jarvis	Audi R18 e-tron quattro	LMP1-H	25	DNF	DNF
2015	(Germany) Audi Sport Team Joest	(Italy) Marco Bonanomi (Germany) René Rast	Audi R18 e-tron quattro	LMP1	387	7th	7th
2016	(Mexico) RGR Sport by Morand	(Mexico) Ricardo González (Brazil) Bruno Senna	Ligier JS P2-Nissan	LMP2	344	15th	10th
2017	(United States) United Autosports	(United States) Will Owen (Switzerland) Hugo de Sadeleer	Ligier JS P217-Gibson	LMP2	362	5th	4th
2018	(United States) United Autosports	(United Kingdom) Phil Hanson (United Kingdom) Paul di Resta	Ligier JS P217-Gibson	LMP2	288	DNF	DNF
2019	(United States) United Autosports	(United Kingdom) Phil Hanson (United Kingdom) Paul di Resta	Ligier JS P217-Gibson	LMP2	365	9th	4th
2020	(United States) United Autosports	(United Kingdom) Phil Hanson (United Kingdom) Paul di Resta	Oreca 07-Gibson	LMP2	370	5th	**1st**
2021	(United Kingdom) United Autosports USA	(United Kingdom) Phil Hanson (Switzerland) Fabio Scherer	Oreca 07-Gibson	LMP2	328	40th	18th
2022	(United States) United Autosports USA	(United Kingdom) Phil Hanson (United States) Will Owen	Oreca 07-Gibson	LMP2	366	14th	10th
2023	(United Kingdom) United Autosports	(United Kingdom) Phil Hanson (United Kingdom) Frederick Lubin	Oreca 07-Gibson	LMP2	321	21st	11th
2024	(United States) United Autosports USA	(United Kingdom) Ben Hanley (United States) Ben Keating	Oreca 07-Gibson	LMP2	272	42nd	13th
2024	(United States) United Autosports USA	(United Kingdom) Ben Hanley (United States) Ben Keating	Oreca 07-Gibson	LMP2 Pro-Am	272	42nd	6th
2025	(United States) Cadillac WTR	(United States) Jordan Taylor (United States) Ricky Taylor	Cadillac V-Series.R	Hypercar	189	DNF	DNF
2026	(United States) Cadillac WTR	(United States) Jordan Taylor (United States) Ricky Taylor	Cadillac V-Series.R	Hypercar	379	9th	9th

=== Complete IMSA SportsCar Championship results ===
(key)(Races in bold indicate pole position)

Year	Team	No.	Class	Make	Engine	1	2	3	4	5	6	7	8	9	10	11	Rank	Points	Ref
2014	Flying Lizard Motorsports	35	GTD	Audi R8 LMS ultra	Audi 5.2L V10	DAY; 5	SEB; 5	LGA	DET	WGL	MOS	IND	ELK	VIR	COA	PET	42nd	57	
2015	Starworks Motorsport	8	PC	Oreca FLM09	Chevrolet LS3 6.2 L V8	DAY; 6	SEB	LGA	BEL	WGL	MOS	LIM	ELK	COA	PET		33rd	27	
2016	Action Express Racing	5	P	Coyote Corvette DP	Chevrolet 5.5L V8	DAY; 4	SEB; 3	LBH	LGA	BEL	WGL; 1	MOS	ELK	COA	PET; 5		18th	88	
2017	Mustang Sampling Racing	5	P	Cadillac DPi-V.R	Cadillac 6.2 L V8	DAY; 2	SEB; 2	LBH	COA	BEL	WGL; 1	MOS	ELK	LGA	PET; 5		13th	126	
2018	Mustang Sampling Racing	5	P	Cadillac DPi-V.R	Cadillac 5.5 L V8	DAY; 1	SEB; 10	LBH; 1	MDO; 4	DET; 6	WGL; 6	MOS; 4	ELK; 7	LGA; DNS	PET; 4		6th	249	
2019	Mustang Sampling Racing	5	DPi	Cadillac DPi-V.R	Cadillac 5.5 L V8	DAY; 7	SEB; 3	LBH; 1	MDO; 8	DET; 6	WGL; 6	MOS; 10	ELK; 6	LGA; 5	PET; 7		7th	258	
2020	Whelen Engineering Racing	31	DPi	Cadillac DPi-V.R	Cadillac 5.5 L V8	DAY; 7	DAY	SEB	ELK	ATL; 3	MDO	PET; 5	LGA	SEB			19th	80	
2021	Konica Minolta Acura	10	DPi	Acura ARX-05	Acura AR35TT 3.5 L Turbo V6	DAY; 1	SEB; 4	MDO; 1	DET; 3	**WGL**; 3	**WGL**; 3	ELK; 4	**LGA**; 1	LBH; 4	PET; 3		2nd	3396	
2022	Konica Minolta Acura	10	DPi	Acura ARX-05	Acura AR35TT 3.5 L Turbo V6	**DAY**; 2	SEB; 4	LBH; 6	**LGA**; 1	MDO; 1	DET; 4	WGL; 1	MOS; 6	**ELK**; 1	PET; 6		2nd	3346	
2023	Wayne Taylor Racing with Andretti Autosport	10	GTP	Acura ARX-06	Acura AR24e 2.4 L Turbo V6	DAY; 2	SEB; 4	**LBH**; 7	LGA; 4	WGL; 6	MOS; 2	ELK; 3	IMS; 5	**PET**; **9**			2nd	2712	
2024	Wayne Taylor Racing with Andretti	10	GTP	Acura ARX-06	Acura AR24e 2.4 L Turbo V6	DAY; 9	SEB; 5	LBH; 8	LGA; 6	DET; 1	WGL; 10		**ELK**; 3	IMS; 4	PET; 9		6th	2550	
2024	United Autosports USA	22	LMP2	Oreca 07	Gibson GK428 V8							MOS; 5					41st	292	
2025	Cadillac Wayne Taylor Racing	10	GTP	Cadillac V-Series.R	Cadillac LMC55R 5.5 L V8	DAY; 5	SEB; 7	LBH; 6	LGA; 8	DET; 2	WGL; 3	ELK; 8	IMS; 2	PET; 6			6th	2626	
2026	Cadillac Wayne Taylor Racing	10	GTP	Cadillac V-Series.R	Cadillac LMC55R 5.5 L V8	DAY; 11	SEB; 11	LBH; 10	LGA; 11	DET; 3	WGL; 7	ELK; 1	IMS; 6	PET; 4			11th	2448	

=== Complete European Le Mans Series results ===
Year	Entrant	Class	Chassis	Engine	1	2	3	4	5	6	Rank	Points
2014	Jota Sport	LMP2	Zytek Z11SN	Nissan VK45DE 4.5 L V8	**SIL**; Ret	**IMO**; 1	**RBR**; 2	LEC; 4	**EST**; 3		2nd	74
2015	Jota Sport	LMP2	Zytek Z11SN	Nissan VK45DE 4.5 L V8	SIL; 2	**IMO**; 3	**RBR**; 1	**LEC**; 3	**EST**; 4		3rd	89
2017	United Autosports	LMP2	Ligier JS P217	Gibson GK428 4.2 L V8	SIL; 1	MNZ; 6	RBR; 1	LEC; 5	SPA; 4	ALG; 2	2nd	98
2018	United Autosports	LMP2	Ligier JS P217	Gibson GK428 4.2 L V8	LEC	MNZ; 10	RBR; 3	SIL; Ret	SPA; 1‡	ALG; 1	6th	53.5
2019	United Autosports	LMP2	Ligier JS P217	Gibson GK428 4.2 L V8	LEC	MNZ; 4	CAT; 7	SIL; Ret	**SPA**; 1	**ALG**; 2	6th	63
2020	United Autosports	LMP2	Oreca 07	Gibson GK428 4.2 L V8	**LEC**; 3	**SPA**; 1	**LEC**; 1	**MNZ**; 1	ALG; 3		1st	109
2023	United Autosports USA	LMP2 Pro-Am	Oreca 07	Gibson GK428 4.2 L V8	CAT	LEC	ARA; 3	SPA	ALG	ALG	19th	15
2024	United Autosports	LMP2 Pro-Am	Oreca 07	Gibson GK428 4.2 L V8	CAT	LEC	IMO	SPA; 6	MUG	ALG	15th	8
2025	Nielsen Racing	LMP2	Oreca 07	Gibson GK428 4.2 L V8	CAT; 7	LEC; 5	IMO; 7	**SPA**; 3	SIL; 6	ALG; Ret	5th	46

^{‡} Half points awarded as less than 75% of race distance was completed.

=== Complete Stock Car Brasil results ===
Year	Team	Car	1	2	3	4	5	6	7	8	9	10	11	12	13	14	15	16	17	18	19	20	21	Rank	Points
2018	Full Time Sports	Chevrolet Cruze	INT; 1; 2	CUR; 1	CUR; 2	VEL; 1	VEL; 2	LON; 1	LON; 2	SCZ; 1	SCZ; 2	GOI; 1	MOU; 1	MOU; 2	CAS; 1	CAS; 2	VCA; 1	VCA; 2	TAR; 1	TAR; 2	GOI; 1	GOI; 2	INT; 1	NC†	0†

^{†} As Albuquerque was a guest driver, he was ineligible for points.

Sporting positions
Preceded by Kamui Kobayashi	Eurocup Formula Renault 2.0; Champion; 2006	Succeeded by Brendon Hartley
Preceded by Pekka Saarinen (German Championship)	Formula Renault 2.0 NEC; Champion; 2006	Succeeded by Frank Kechele
Preceded by Mattias Ekström	Race of Champions; Champion of Champions; 2010	Succeeded by Sébastien Ogier
Preceded by João Barbosa; Christian Fittipaldi	North American Endurance Cup; Champion; 2017; With: João Barbosa & Christian Fittipaldi	Succeeded by Felipe Nasr; Eric Curran
Preceded by Memo Rojas; Paul-Loup Chatin	European Le Mans Series; LMP2 Champion; 2020; With: Phil Hanson	Succeeded by Robert Kubica; Louis Delétraz; Yifei Ye
Preceded by Nicolas Lapierre; André Negrão; Pierre Thiriet	FIA Endurance Trophy for LMP2 Drivers; 2019–20; With: Phil Hanson	Succeeded by Robin Frijns; Ferdinand Habsburg; Charles Milesi
Preceded by Ryan Briscoe; Renger van der Zande	Michelin Endurance Cup; Champion; 2021; With: Ricky Taylor & Alexander Rossi	Succeeded by Tom Blomqvist; Oliver Jarvis
Awards
Preceded by ?	Red Bull Junior of the Year; 2006	Succeeded by None
