= Oreste Cinquini =

Italian sporting director

Oreste Cinquini (born 16 October 1947) is an Italian sporting director. From 2017 to 2018 he was the sporting director for FC Zenit Saint Petersburg. He is now assistant sporting director with Zenit.

== Career ==
Cinquini was born in Viareggio. As a young man he was a player in Tuscan amateur teams, including the Forte dei Marmi.

His career as a manager in football starts in the 1994/95 season in Fiorentina, and in the following year he won his fifth Italian Cup. From 1998/99 season he moved to Bologna, where he remained for three seasons working closely with coaches like Carlo Mazzone and Sergio Buso. In 2002 he spent two seasons at Lazio, who won the Italian Cup in 2004 under the guidance of Roberto Mancini. Later he was manager for a season (2004/2005) in Udinese and for the one seasib after in Parma. In June 2006, after months of courtship, the president of Cagliari, Massimo Cellino manages to bring him to Sardinia and entrusts him with the role of general manager. His adventure in Sardinian land, however, lasts very little, Cellino is in fact was determined to manage the football market in first person and Cinquini, while entering into good negotiations, was subject to the decisions of the President, who, after a disastrous start of the championship decides to get rid of him.

In June 2007, some voices saw him close to taking Bettega's place at Juventus after a period of inactivity, in which, however, as an external observer, he gave a hand to La Spezia on the verge of bankruptcy, and on 18 July 2008 he signed with Pisa as head in technical area. For him it was the first time as a manager of a Serie B team. On January 24, 2009 after the umpteenth defeat suffered with Grossetofor 4-1 he was fired.

On 21 June 2011 he was appointed manager of Unione Venezia, a team in the Serie D championship. On 20 July 2012 he left the role, to follow Fabio Capello in Russia. From 2012 to 2015 he was the assistant head coach of Russia Fabio Capello. He performed the duties of Manager, responsible for everything that happened in the team and beyond.

On 13 June 2017 he was appointed as the director of sports in FC Zenit Saint Petersburg. During the summer 2018, Zenit hired Javier Ribalta as their director of sports, with Cinquini becoming Ribalta's assistant.
