= René Villa =

Costa Rican singer-songwriter, model, actor (born 1997)

- Born: José René Villafuerte Flores; 26 January 1997 (age 29); Nicoya, Costa Rica
- Origin: Dublin, Ireland
- Genres: Pop; Latin pop; Dance; Electronic
- Occupations: Singer; Actor; Model; Songwriter
- Instrument: Vocals
- Years active: 2021 – present
- Label: AWAL
- Website: renevilla.co.uk

José René Villafuerte Flores (born 26 January 1997), known as René Villa, is a Costa Rican singer-songwriter, model and actor, based in Ireland.

== Biography ==
René Villa was born on 26 January 1997 in Nicoya. As a child, Villa was heavily into Carlos Rivera, Luis Fonsi, Christina Aguilera and Mariah Carey. Especially Carey influenced his music style, to bring different types of music together.

Throughout his career, René has worked with Costa Rican musician and producer Alan Shepard, as well as Nelss, Carlox, among countless others.

As a solo artist, he has released two albums and EPs that defy category, traversing intimate singer songwriter, pop, Latin pop, pop rock, electronic and dance.

René submitted the first songs he ever wrote, and found himself making his debut with “Dónde Estás”, under the name of Shory Flores.

Before changing his artist name, the songs were released by his old names, including "Juntos (Al Amanecer)" and "Te Quiero (Pa' Mi)".

During 2020, Villa participated on Shepard's album The Right Time, which is the featuring in ”A Tu Lado" under the pseudo name of “Jay Flores”.

In 2021, the album Rawr was released in the U.K., which contains nine songs, including "It's Your Fault", written by René and produced by Shepard.

== Discography ==
=== Singles & EPs ===
- Es Imposible (2021)
- Si Tú No Estás (2022)
- En Peligro de Extinción (2022)
- Mistakes (2022)
- Solo A Tu Lado Quiero Vivir (2023)
- Te Quise Olvidar (2024)
- Somos Sámara (2024)
- Soy Tico (2025)
- Navidad En Sámara (2025)
- Por Qué Te Vas (2026)
- Todavía Siento (2026)
- Te Sigo Amando (2026)

=== Albums ===
- Cartas Abiertas (2026)
