= René Bricard =

French Resistance member

René Bricard was a Frenchman who was active in the French Resistance during World War II. He was made a Commander of the Legion of Honour in 2002. He died in 2015.
