= Giovanni Cinqui =

Italian painter (1667–1743)

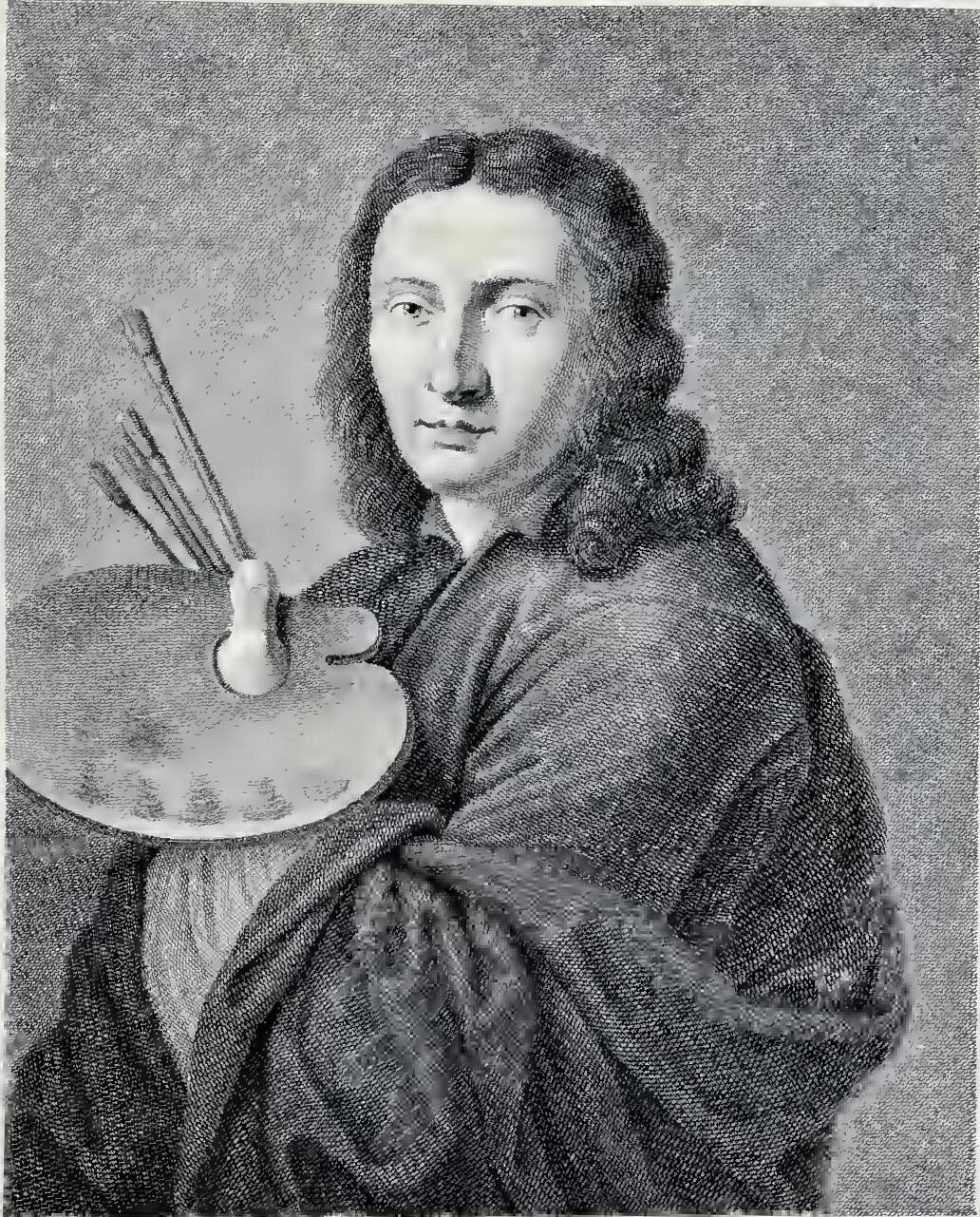
- Born: 9 April 1667
- Died: 29 December 1743 (aged 76)

Giovanni Cinqui or Giovanni del Cinque (1667–1743) was an Italian painter.

== Biography ==
Born in Scarperia, he trained in Florence under Pietro Dandini. He worked in the court of Cosimo III. He painted in the Villa Medicea dell'Ambrogiana, the Palazzo di Gino Capponi in Florence, the Oratory of the Villa Medicea di Lilliano, and for the church of Santa Rosa at Viterbo.

He painted the 149 scenes of a series on the life of Christ that is currently kept in the oratory of the Royal Palace of Riofrio in Segovia, acquired by the king Philip V of Spain.
