= René Gaulon =

French and Beninese footballer (1927–2012)

Personal information
- Date of birth: 7 July 1927
- Place of birth: Cotonou, French Dahomey (now Benin)
- Date of death: 19 April 2012 (aged 84)
- Place of death: Angers, France
- Height: 1.74 m (5 ft 9 in)
- Position: Midfielder

Senior career*
Years	Team	Apps	(Gls)
–1949	Sporting Club Dakar		
1949–1950	Stade Français-Red Star		
1950–1954	Stade Français		
1954–1956	Red Star		
1956–1961	Stade Rennais	152	(11)

International career
1952	France B	1	(1)
- Dahomey

Managerial career
- 1961–1964: Stella Maris Douarnenez
- 1964–1965: AS Brestoise
- 1965–1969: SO Cholet
- 1970–1975: EF Le May-sur-Evre
- 1975–1977: FC Montaigu
- * Club domestic league appearances and goals

René Gaulon (7 July 1927 – 19 April 2012) was a footballer who played as a midfielder. Born in French Dahomey, he represented both the France national B team and Dahomey national team.

== Playing career ==
Born in French Dahomey, Gaulon began his career in French Senegal with Sporting Club Dakar, before joining Stade Français-Red Star in 1949. After the club split, he stayed with Stade Français, before later joining Red Star in 1954. In 1956, he signed for Stade Rennais, becoming one of the club's first ever black players. At Rennes, he made over 160 appearances for the club, before retiring in 1961.

Gaulon made one appearance for the France national football B team, in a 6–1 win against the England amateur national team in May 1952. The following year, he played an unofficial match for the France national team against a team of professional Dutch players, prior to the Netherlands national team allowing professional players. He later played for the Dahomey national team, becoming one of the country's first international footballers.

== Managerial career ==
Shortly after his retirement, he was appointed the manager of Stella Maris Douarnenez, where he helped them win the Coupe de France FSF against CEP de Lorient in 1964. He later managed AS Brestoise, SO Cholet, EF Le May-sur-Evre, and FC Montaigu.

== Death ==
Gaulon died on 19 April 2012, at the age of 84.

== Honours ==
Stade Français

- French Division 2: 1951–52
