= René Bégué =

French fashion designer

René Bégué (1887–1987) was a French fashion designer who founded Rébé, best known for its millinery.

René Bégué was born in Paris on 26 June 1887.

In 1903, he began working for the lace manufacturer Henri Breton. In 1904, he won a competition at the House of Paquin, one of his clients, for a new embroidery designer, and moved to London.
