= Rene Cinquin =

American cartographer (1898–1978)

René Cinquin (1898–1978) was an American creator of panoramic maps and a painter. Several of his maps are in the Library of Congress' collection. Metropolitan Aero-View Co. was a publisher of his maps.

The firm of Hughes & Cinquin produced panoramic maps during the 1920s under the sponsorship of Oakley H. Bailey (1843-1947), a panoramic map artist and publisher. The panoramic map collection of the Library of Congress has seven Aero-View maps of Long Island towns and six of New Jersey towns drawn by Rene Cinquin between 1924 and 1929. Most were published by either Hughes & Cinquin, Brooklyn, or Metropolitan Aero-View Co., New York.

Cinquin's map of Patchogue includes an extensive writeup about the community.

== Gallery ==
Margate City, New Jersey

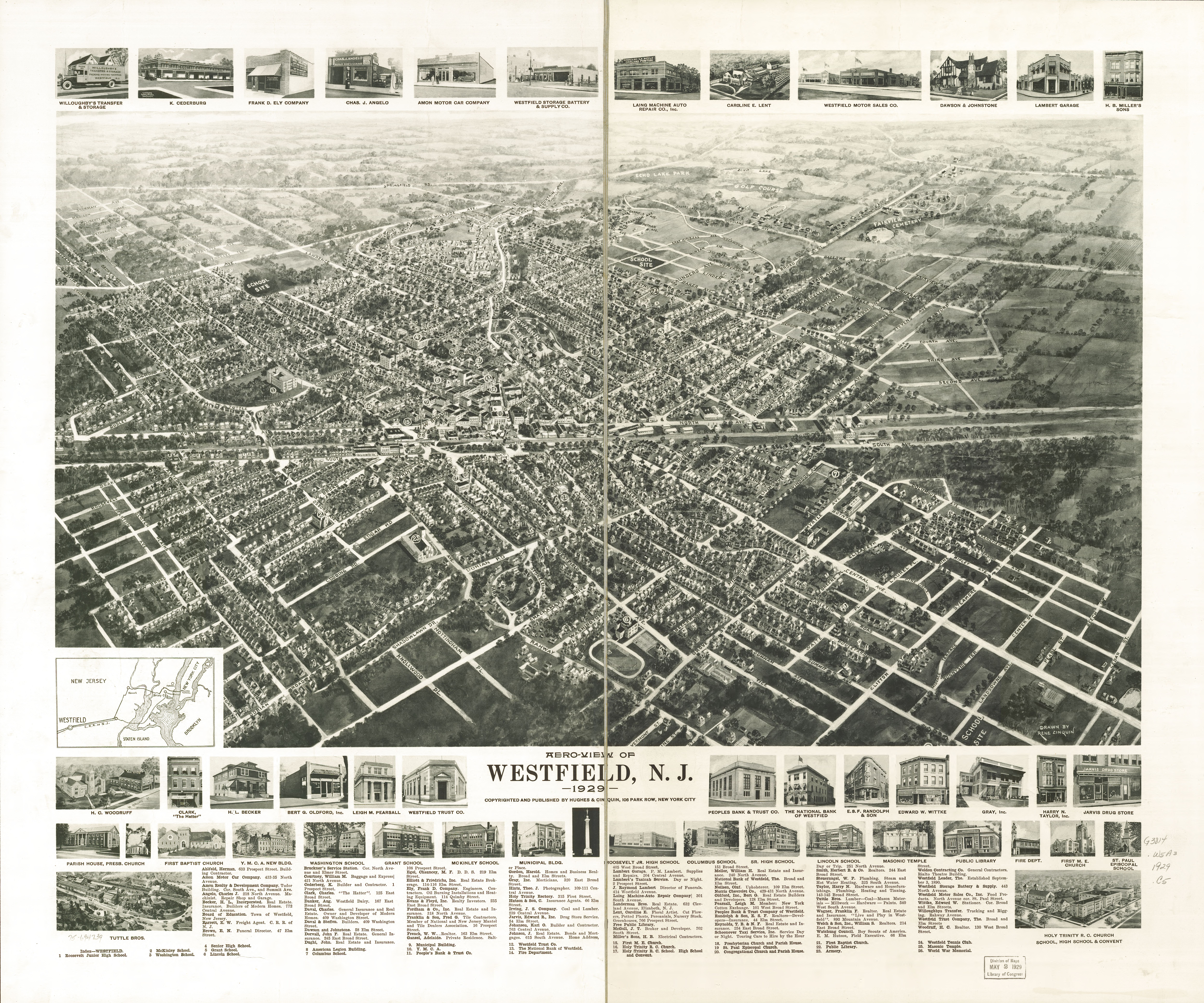
Westfield, New Jersey

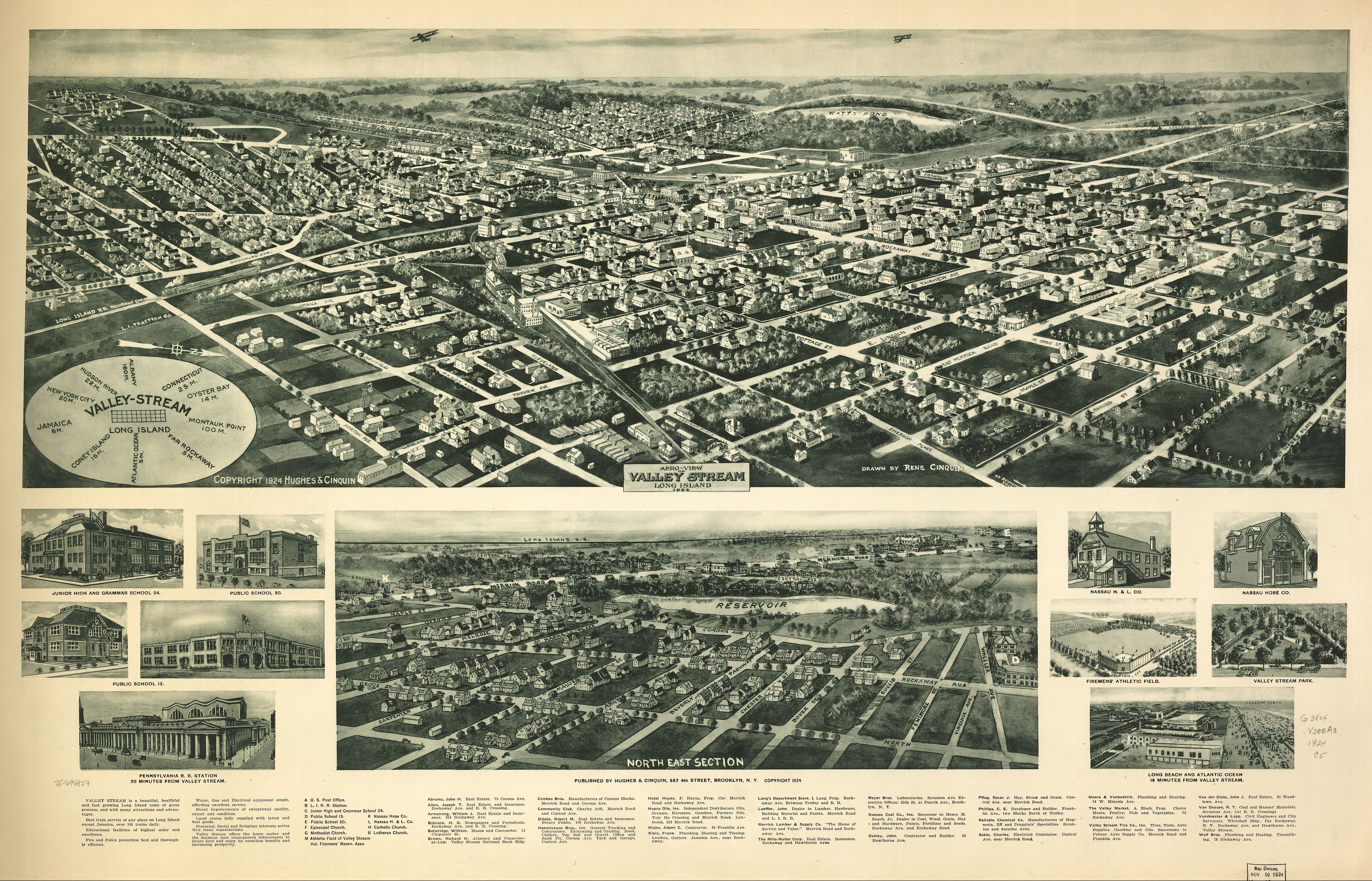
Valley Stream, Long Island

Absecon, New Jersey

Westwood, New Jersey

Somers-Point, New Jersey

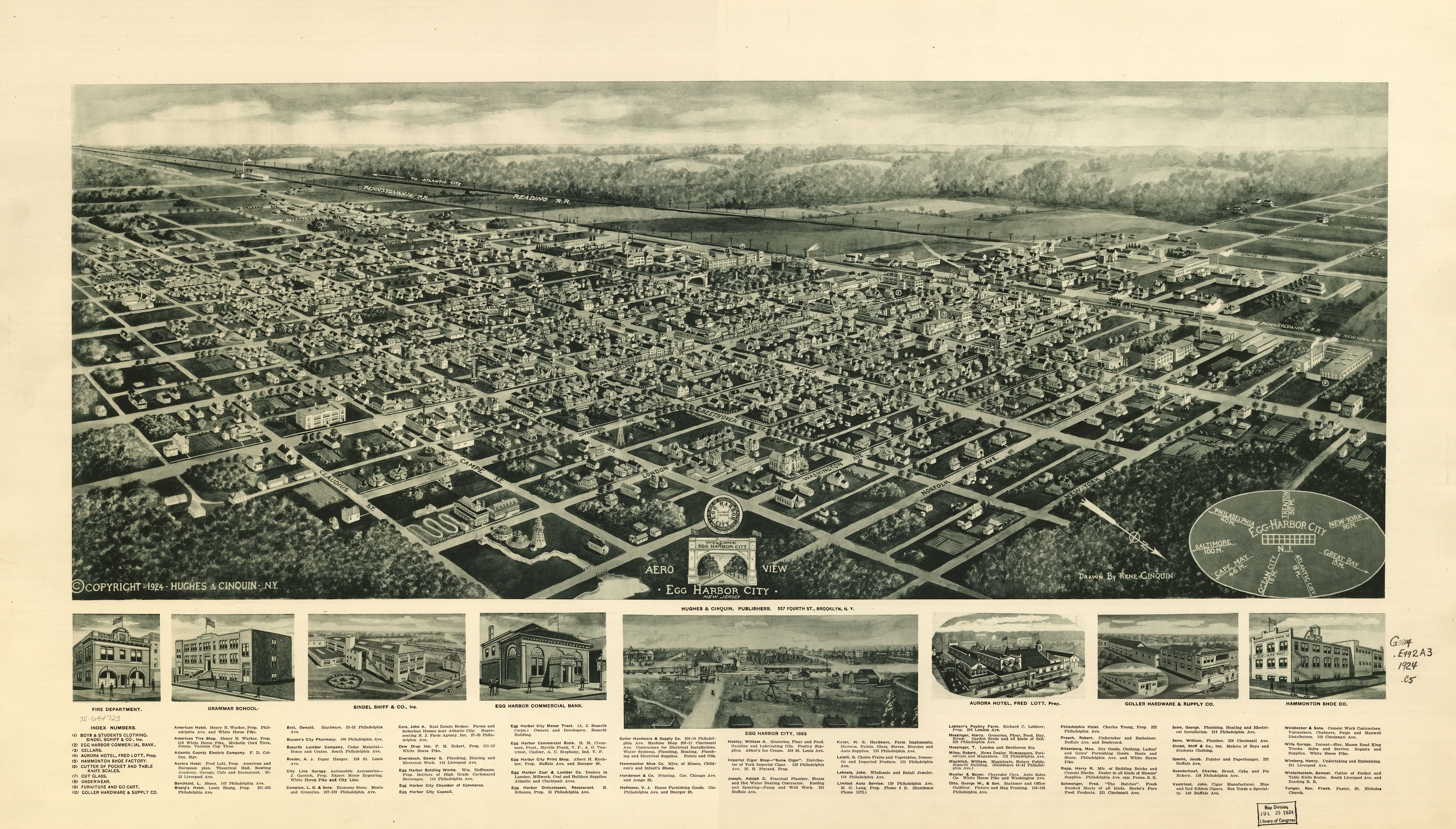
Egg Harbor City, New Jersey

Farmingdale, New York

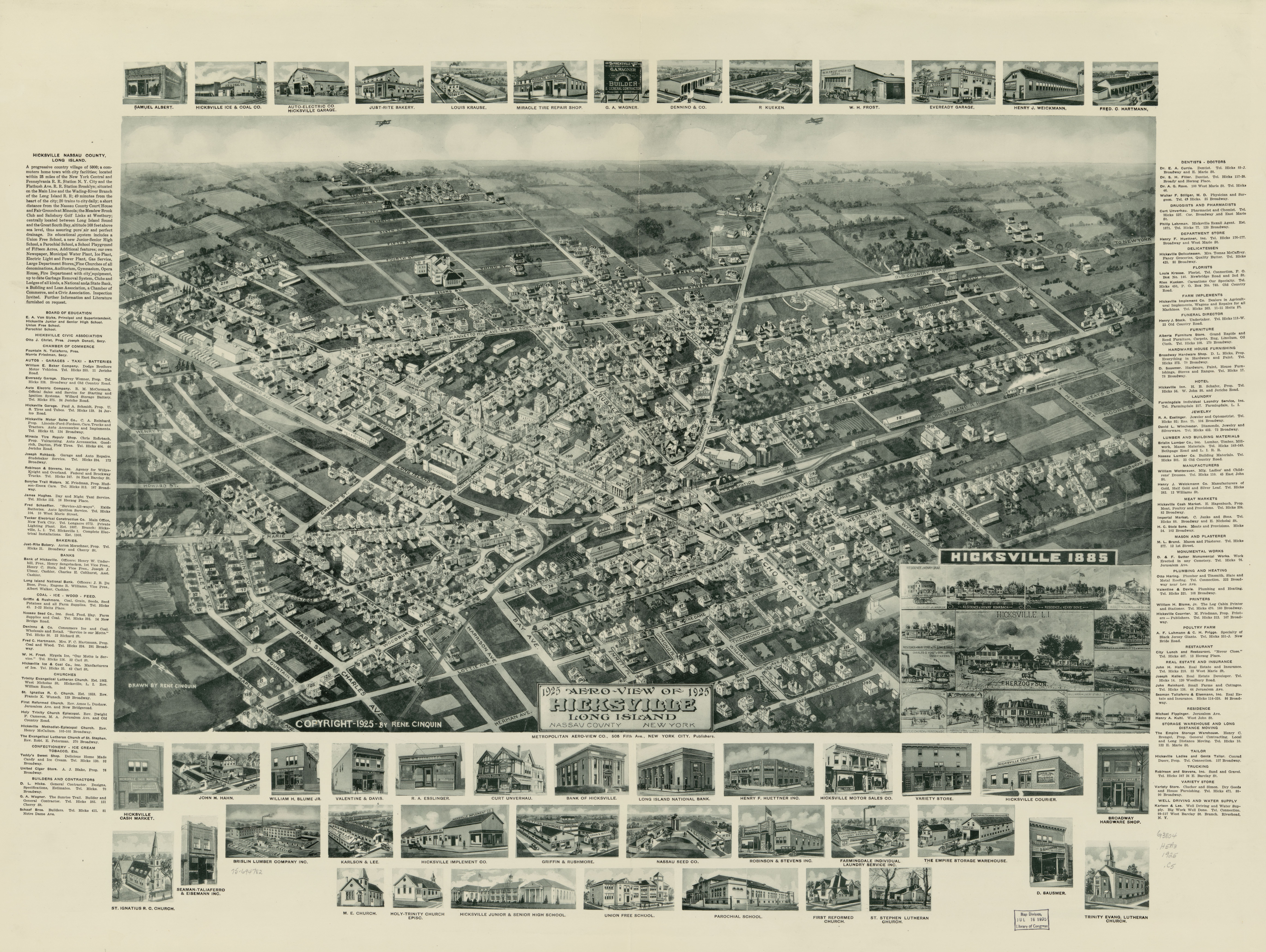
Hicksville, New York

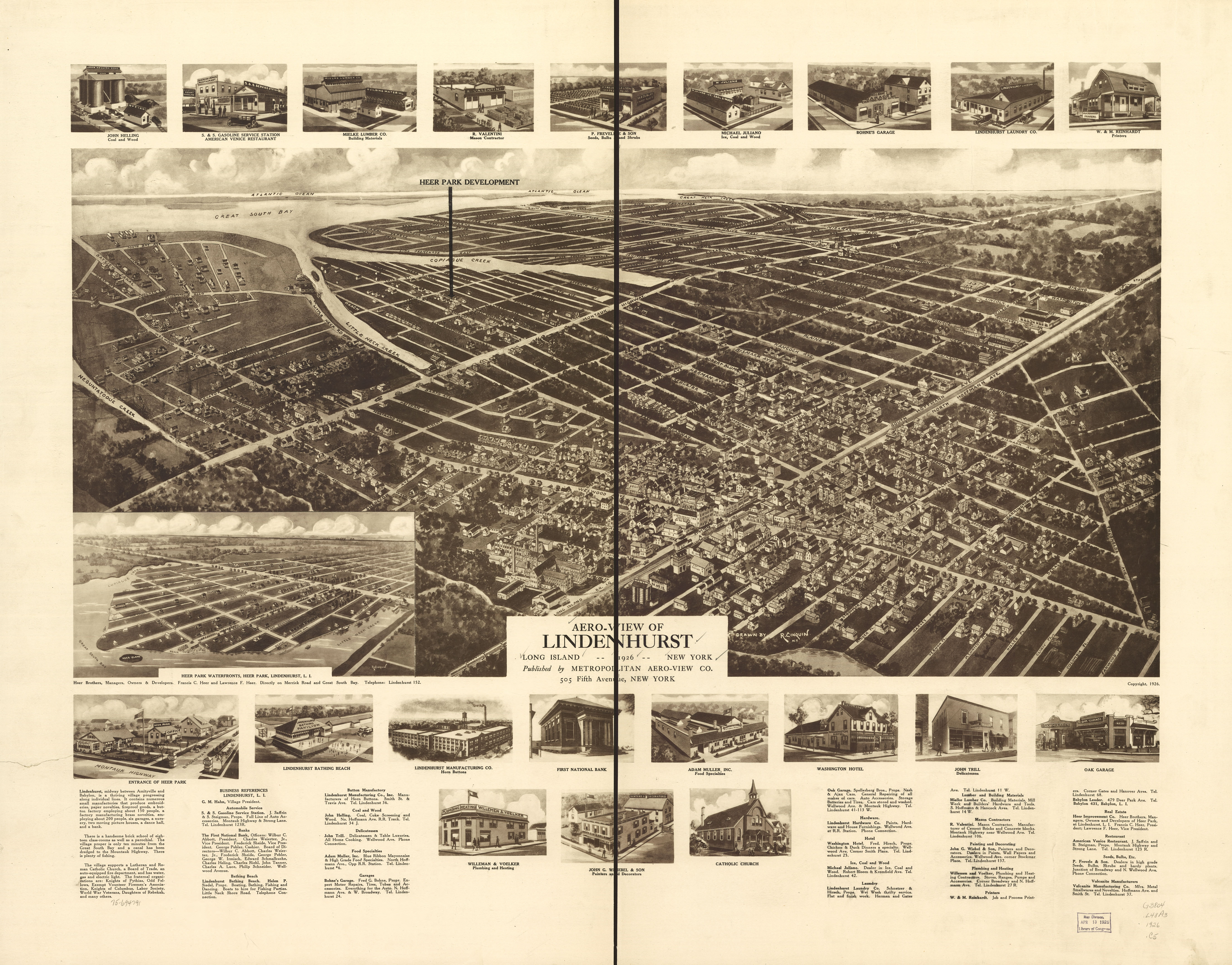
Lindenhurst, New York

Freeport, Long Island

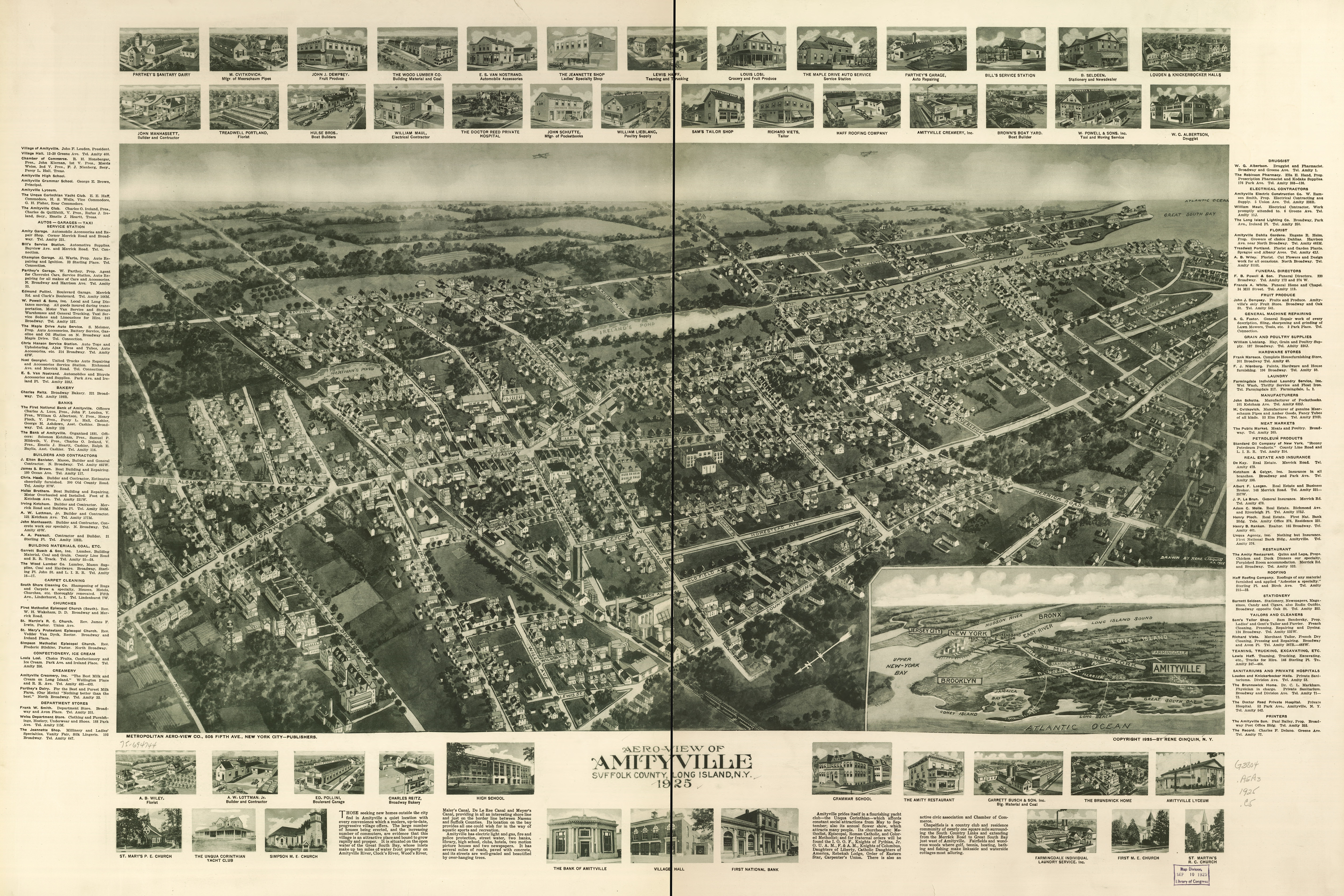
Amityville, New York

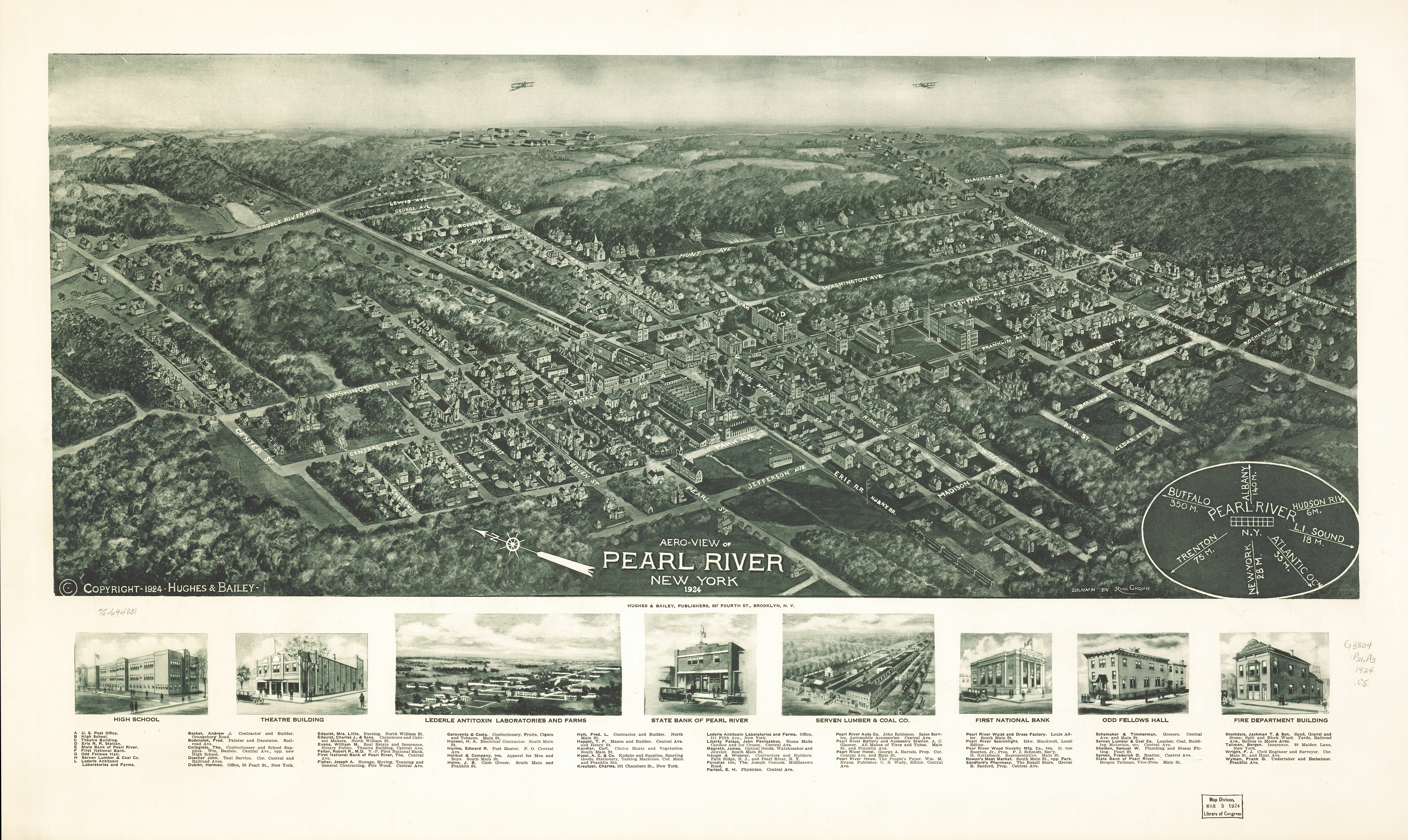
Pearl River, New York
