= US Airways Group =

Airline holding company

US Airways Group Inc.
- Type: Public
- Traded as: NYSE: LCC
- Industry: Aviation
- Predecessor: America West Holdings (acquired US Airways Group in 2005 and took its name)
- Founded: 1939
- Defunct: December 9, 2013
- Fate: Acquired AMR Corporation, formed American Airlines Group
- Successor: American Airlines Group
- Headquarters: Tempe, Arizona, United States
- Key people: Doug Parker (CEO); Scott Kirby (President)
- Revenue: ▲US$13.05 billion (2011)
- Operating income: ▼US$426 million (2011)
- Net income: ▼US$71 million (2011)
- Total assets: ▲US$8.33 billion (2011)
- Total equity: ▲US$150 million (2011)
- Number of employees: 31,467 (2011)
- Website: Archived official website at the Wayback Machine (archive index)

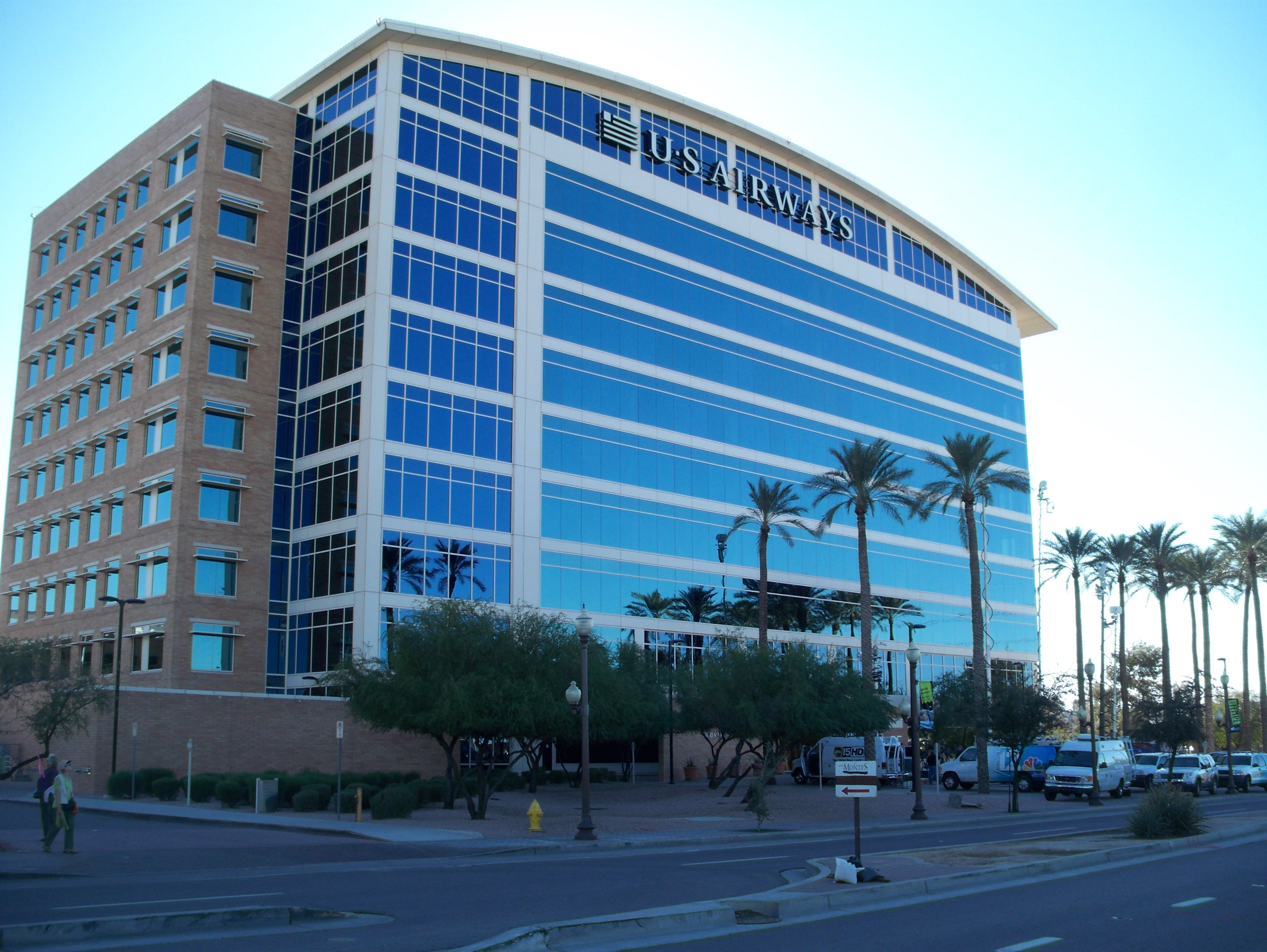
US Airways headquarters in Tempe

US Airways Group Inc. was an airline holding company based in Tempe, Arizona. US Airways Group operated US Airways, along with its subsidiaries PSA Airlines, Inc. and Piedmont Airlines, Inc., which are wholly owned but marketed under the branding of US Airways Express. It merged with America West Holdings Corporation, parent of America West Airlines, in 2005, and the combined company adopted the better-known US Airways name; the two airlines' operating certificates merged in 2007. It also operates additional companies that provide associated services. ACE Aviation Holdings, the Canadian parent of Air Canada retained a roughly 6.1% investment stake in US Airways Group. The route network covered destinations in 47 states, as well as international destinations.

The company merged with AMR Corporation; the combined business began trading under the new name of American Airlines Group on December 9, 2013. The combined airlines formed the largest airline in the world. US Airways' CEO, Doug Parker, became CEO of the new company.

== History ==
=== Founding and Name Changes ===
US Airways traces its history to All American Aviation Inc, a company founded in 1939 by du Pont family brothers Richard C. du Pont and Alexis Felix du Pont, Jr. Headquartered in Pittsburgh, the airline served the Ohio River valley in 1939. In 1949 the company was renamed All American Airways as it switched from airmail to passenger service; it changed its name again to Allegheny Airlines on January 1, 1953.

In 1979, Allegheny changed its name to USAir, and in February 1997, to US Airways.

=== US Airways/America West merger ===
In August 2002, US Airways Group Inc. filed for bankruptcy protection in an effort to correct its financial problems brought on by rising costs and the post-Sept. 11 drop-off in air travel.

On September 12, 2004, US Airways Group and most of its subsidiaries filed for bankruptcy protection for the second time in three years. US Airways Group and the aforementioned subsidiaries, including US Airways, emerged from Chapter 11 bankruptcy protection with the help $125 million equity investment from Air Wisconsin's parent company Air Wisconsin Airlines Corporation on September 27, 2005, in connection with the completion of its merger with America West Holdings Corporation.

On May 19, 2005, US Airways Group announced that it would merge with Tempe, Arizona-based America West Holdings Corporation, whose strength in the West would complement US Airways' routes in the Northeast, Europe, and the Caribbean. Prior to merging with America West Holdings Corporation, US Airways Group was based in Arlington County, Virginia. At the time of announcement, plans called for the new entity to retain the US Airways brand, its Dividend Miles frequent flyer program, and participation in the Star Alliance (subject to the approval of partner United Airlines); however, it would be headquartered at America West's corporate offices and America West executives and board members would be in control of the merged company. The merger was completed on September 27, 2005.

In October 2006, US Airways leased new office space in a building across the street from its corporate headquarters in Tempe, Arizona to expand and centralize its Corporate operations.

=== US Airways/Delta proposed merger ===
On November 15, 2006, US Airways Group announced a proposal to purchase Delta Air Lines for $8.0 billion, half of this amount to be paid in cash with the remainder to be paid in stock. US Airways Group had obtained a firm commitment from Citibank to provide financing for both the cash portion of the merger offer, as well as the required secured loan refinancing at both airlines. The combined airlines would have flown under the Delta Air Lines name. Delta Air Lines repeatedly stated its intentions of exiting bankruptcy as a stand-alone carrier. On December 19, 2006, Delta's Board of Directors officially rejected US Airways offer. The final decision, however, was up to Delta Air Lines creditors as well as a bankruptcy judge as to what would happen.

Delta employees, represented by the Delta Board Council and the Air Line Pilots Association, organized against what they termed the "hostile takeover" effort by US Airways under the title "Keep Delta My Delta". A rally against the US Airways merger at the Georgia International Convention Center was held December 13, 2006, and attended by nearly 3000 pilots, family members, and other supporters.

On January 10, 2007, US Airways upped their bid for Delta from $8.5 billion to $10.2 billion, and imposed a deadline of February 1 for Delta's creditors committee to move forward with the deal. The move was made, according to US Airways president Scott Kirby, to remove any doubt that the US Airways offer was the best one on the table.

On January 31, 2007, following a decision by the creditors committee to support Delta's standalone reorganization plan, US Airways withdrew its merger offer.

=== US Airways/American Airlines merger ===
In January 2012, US Airways expressed interest to take over American Airlines and the AMR CEO said in March, that American is open to merger. As of September 2012, American Airlines, under chapter 11 bankruptcy protection, was looking to merge with another airline. In July of that year, in a Bankruptcy Court filing US Airways disclosed that it was an American Airlines creditor and "prospective merger partner. Then on August 31, 2012, US Airways CEO Doug Parker announced that American Airlines and US Airways had signed a nondisclosure agreement, in which the airlines would discuss their financials and a possible merger."

On February 14, 2013, US Airways Group and AMR Corporation officially announced that the two companies would merge to form the largest airline in the world. The combined airline will carry the American Airlines name and branding, while US Airways' management team, including CEO Doug Parker, will retain most operational management positions. The headquarters for the new airline will also be consolidated at American's current headquarters in Fort Worth, Texas.

== Subsidiaries ==
=== Airline subsidiary divisions ===
- US Airways, Inc. which includes US Airways Shuttle
- Piedmont Airlines, Inc. dba US Airways Express
- PSA Airlines, Inc. dba US Airways Express

=== Airline related business subsidiaries and divisions ===
- US Airways Express
- America West Holdings Corporation f/k/a Barbell Acquisition Corp.
  - America West Airlines, Inc., including its America West Vacations division
- Material Services Company, Inc. is the purchasing arm for US Airways Express.
- Airways Assurance Limited, LLC is a foreign-based insurance subsidiary.

=== Airline holdings ===
US Airways Group used to hold a (10%) investment in Mesa Air Group

=== Former subsidiaries ===
- Allegheny Airlines, Inc. dba US Airways Express, was merged into Piedmont Airlines, Inc., on July 1, 2004
- US Airways Leasing and Sales, Inc. remarketed aircraft, parts, and equipment, and was merged into US Airways, Inc., on July 1, 2004
- US Airways Services Corporation, Inc. f/k/a MidAtlantic Airways, Inc., was merged into US Airways, Inc., on July 1, 2004
- Potomac Air, Inc. dba US Airways Express ceased operations in October 2001
- Shuttle, Inc. dba US Airways Shuttle, was merged into US Airways, Inc., on July 1, 2000
