= Ben Baldanza =

American business executive (1961–2024)

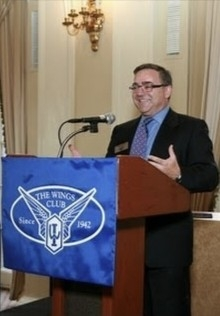
- Baldanza at a Wings Club luncheon in 2013
- Born: Basil Ben Baldanza Jr. December 3, 1961; Rome, New York, U.S.
- Died: November 5, 2024 (aged 62); Arlington County, Virginia, U.S.
- Education: Syracuse University (B.A.); Princeton University (MPA)
- Occupation: Business executive
- Years active: 1986–2024
- Spouse: Marcia Moshier (m. 1987)
- Children: 1
- Awards: Wright Brothers Memorial Trophy

Non-executive director of SixFlags
- In office November 15, 2021 – November 5, 2024
- Preceded by: Selim Bassoul
- Succeeded by: Vacant

CEO and President of Spirit Airlines
- In office January 24, 2005 – January 4, 2016
- Preceded by: Jacob M. Shorr
- Succeeded by: Robert Fornaro

Basil Ben Baldanza Jr. (December 3, 1961 – November 5, 2024) was an American business executive who was the chief executive officer and president of Spirit Airlines from 2005 to 2016, a period in which he led the transformation of the company into an ultra-low-cost carrier.

== Early life and education ==
Basil Ben Baldanza Jr. was born to Air Force civilian personnel Basil B. Baldanza Sr. (1920–2008) and homemaker Norma V. Baldanza (1924–1983) in Rome, New York, on December 3, 1961. He had 4 siblings. His brother, Mark, died in 1991. In his youth, he played the trombone and briefly thought of a professional musical career. He later attended Syracuse University and graduated with a bachelor's degree in policy studies and economics in 1984. He earned his Master of Public Affairs degree at Princeton University in 1986.

== Career ==
In 1986, Baldanza began his career in the airline industry working for the American Airlines Group until 1991, where he was a member of chief executive officer Robert Crandall's "Brat Pack", alongside Thomas W. Horton, C. David Cush, and Doug Parker.

He was later employed by Northwest Airlines and briefly worked at the UPS afterwards. In August 1994, he was hired by Continental Airlines as the VP of Pricing, and soon was promoted to EVP of Marketing. By December 1996, he had left Continental to serve as the managing director and COO of TACA Airlines. While at Taca, he also served on the board of directors of Frontier Airlines. From September 27, 1999 to January 2005, he served as the senior vice president of Marketing and International Operations for US Airways while a troubling period during which the company filed for bankruptcy twice in as many years.

Baldanza left US Airways to become the president and COO of Spirit Airlines on January 24, 2005. He became the chief executive officer of Spirit in May 2006. At the time, the company had lost $79 million the previous year. He replaced Jacob M. Schorr, who had served as CEO since 2000. During his tenure, Baldanza was "the public face of Spirit's transformation into a more extreme version of a discount airline." He designed a plan to transform it into an ultra-low-cost carrier. The company implemented a "Bare Fare" model, opting to charge airline fees for many services included in traditional airline fares. This included fees for the option to select a desired seat, food and drink, carry-on and checked baggages. On July 14, 2010, Baldanza testified in a U.S. Congress hearing in which he defended the airline's unpopular "policy to unbundle services not essential to passenger transport." He was featured in a 2010 video in which he placed himself inside an overhead bin to defend the airlines new policy on carry-on fees by saying "Had we not implemented this, there's no telling what people would try to put in an overhead bin".

According to The Seattle Times, Baldanza's annual salary was $607,360 in 2010. His annual salary was $500,000 in 2014. Benzinga estimated his net worth at $15.3 million in November 2024.

During his tenure, the airline became profitable in "a period in which many airlines struggled to stay in business." By 2011, "Spirit [had] earned 40% more per airplane than any other U.S. airline". Baldanza and other executives at Spirit were paid less than others in the industry, but instead owned shares in the company. Baldanza often promoted terms such as "a bus with wings" and "dollar store of the sky" to describe the airline. He pushed for ways of offsetting costs by selling advertising spaces where ever available on the plane, including flight attendant aprons, seat back trays, overhead bins, napkins, cups and sickness bags; it was also during his tenure that the airline's entire fleet of planes would get repainted bright yellow, which would remain the company's main color until its collapse in 2026. His company used advertising that often went viral instead of relying on a large marketing budget. Their advertisements often contained sexual innuendo as well as topical subjects in pop culture and politics. Examples include the "Weiner sale" in 2011, shortly after the initial Anthony Weiner sexting scandals, advertising $9 fares that were "too HARD to resist".

On January 4, 2016, Baldanza resigned from his position as chief executive officer and president of Spirit, after serving in the position for more than 10 years. The resignation was described by several news outlets as unexpected and abrupt. Baldanza stated that the move was part of "an orderly succession plan." Spirit said that Baldanza had recently moved his family to Washington, D.C. He was replaced by Robert Fornaro, a member of the board that Baldanza personally recruited in 2014.

Baldanza served on the board of JetBlue, Wow Air, Odyssey Airlines, Go First and Six Flags. He was also an adjunct professor of economics at George Mason University. He co-hosted a weekly podcast called Airlines Confidential with long-time The Wall Street Journal journalist Scott McCartney. Baldanza retired from the podcast on August 11, 2024, citing health issues.

On November 15, 2021, Baldanza was elected as the non-executive chairman of Six Flags. He was the CEO of Diemacher LLC from 2016 until his death.

== Criticism ==
Baldanza faced significant criticism stemming from transformation of Spirit Airlines into an ultra-low-cost carrier. He was largely unapologetic about his company's new pricing policy.

The most reported criticism of Baldanza stemmed from his handling of customer complaints, most notably his initial refusal to refund the fare of a terminally-ill military veteran in May 2012. The Vietnam veteran was diagnosed with cancer and was recently informed that it was terminal and that he was unfit to travel by plane. He requested a refund and was refused. Baldanza initially defended his team's decision by stating that the customer had purchased a non-refundable fare with no insurance and therefore the company did not owe him a refund as that would be unfair to other customers. He faced criticism from veterans organizations including a social media campaign to boycott Spirit Airlines. Baldanza eventually apologized for failing to "demonstrate the respect or the compassion that [he] should have, given [the customer's] medical condition and his service to [his] country." He announced he would return the price of the fare from his own funds and that Spirit Airlines would make a donation to a veteran's group.

== Charity and philanthropy ==
Baldanza and his wife supported various educational institutions and arts programs through the Baldanza Fund.

He participated in the Ice Bucket Challenge in August 2014, while challenging Richard H. Anderson to join.

He served on Syracuse University's Maxwell School of Citizenship and Public Affairs Advisory Board.

Baldanza acted as a treasurer for the American Youth Philharmonic Orchestras and served on the Audit Committee for the International Trombone Association.

== Personal life and death ==
In 1987, Baldanza married Marcia Moshier, with whom he had one son; Marcia Baldanza is an assistant professor of education at Marymount University as of 2021.

He used to own a collection of thousands of board games which he played. In June 2023, he donated most of his games to local DC-area and Pennsylvania gaming groups, keeping about 100 for his family. He was a voting member of the International Gamers Awards.

Baldanza lived in Houston for five years. He also lived in McLean, Virginia, San Salvador, Fort Lauderdale, Florida and the Washington metropolitan area.

In 2022, Baldanza was diagnosed with ALS caused by a mutation in the C9orf72 gene. His mother, Norma, died of the same disease in 1983, at age 58. He died of ALS at his home in Arlington County, Virginia, on November 5, 2024, at age 62.

== Awards and recognition ==
Baldanza was named among 25 Most Influential People in Business Travel in 2002 and 2015 by Business Travel News.

In May 2023, Baldanza was awarded the Joseph S. Murphy Award for his service to the airline industry. This is an award that Air Transport World Magazine gives rarely.

Baldanza was awarded the Wright Brothers Memorial Trophy in June 2024 and was scheduled to receive it at the 76th Annual Wright Memorial Dinner, planned to be hosted by the Aero Club of Washington in Washington, D.C. on December 13, 2024.
