= America West Holdings =

Arizona-based company

America West Holdings Corporation
- Industry: Aviation
- Founded: September 4, 1981; 45 years ago
- Defunct: September 27, 2005; 21 years ago
- Fate: Acquired US Airways Group and took its name
- Successor: US Airways Group
- Subsidiaries: America West Airlines; America West Express

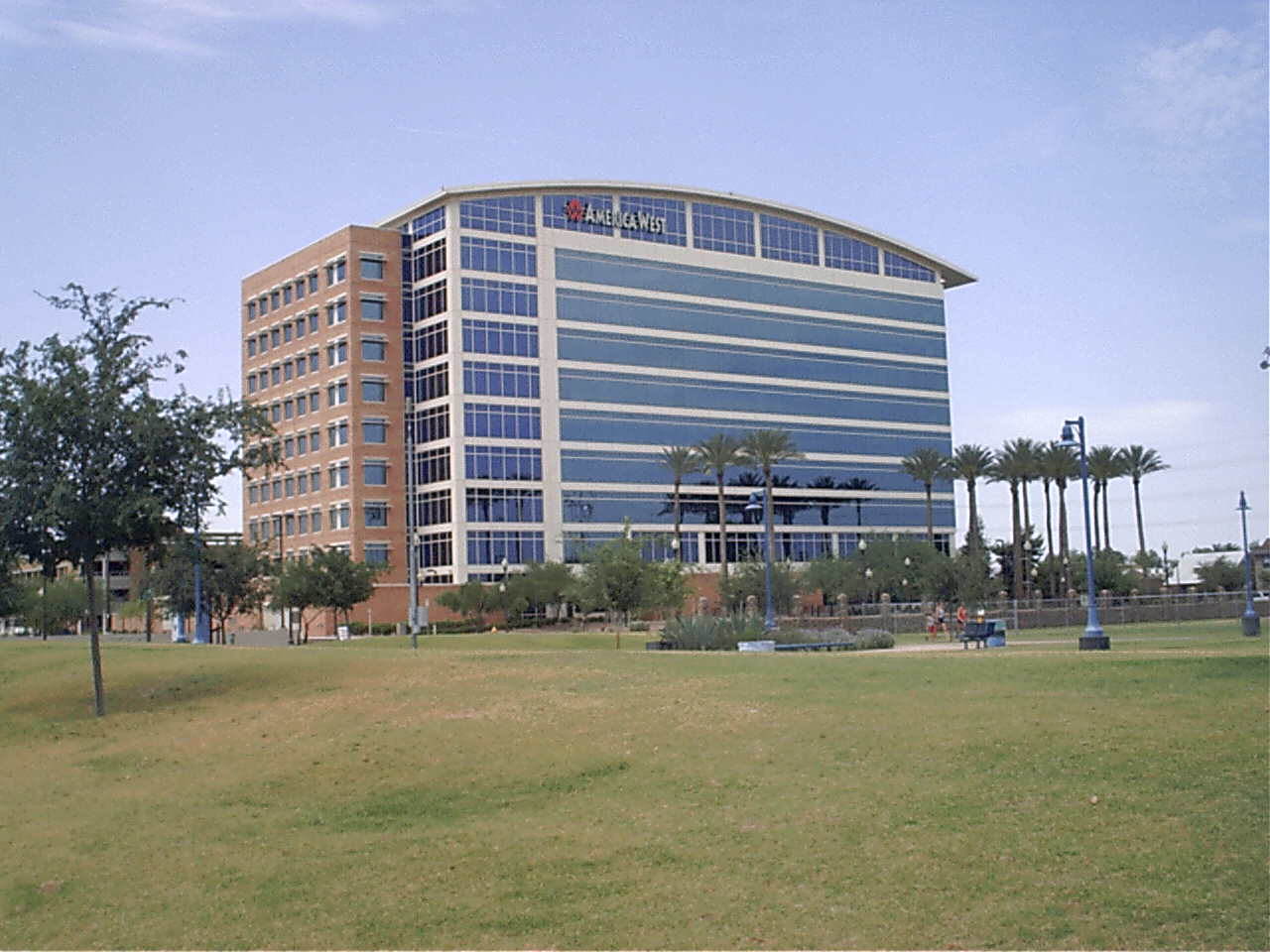
America West Airlines headquarters, later the US Airways headquarters

America West Holdings Corporation was an Arizona-based company whose primary holding was America West Airlines. On May 19, 2005, America West Holdings Corporation announced it would acquire the Arlington, Virginia-based US Airways Group.

The merged company adopted the well-known US Airways Group name and was based in America West's former corporate offices in Tempe. US Airways Group corporate offices in Arlington were closed, and most US Airways management were laid off. America West CEO Doug Parker became CEO of the merged company. The merger was completed on September 27, 2005. A merger of the two airlines' FAA operating certificates occurred on September 25, 2007 (the US Airways certificate survived), ending the 24-year history of the America West Airlines name.

== History ==
The company was founded September 4, 1981, by a group of investors led by Edward R. Beauvais. The first flight for America West Airlines took place on August 1, 1983, using a leased Boeing 737. Beauvais ran the company until he resigned in 1992.

In December, 2004, America West Holdings Corporation announced interest in buying part of ATA Airlines, but did not submit a bid.

=== Merger with US Airways Group ===
On April 22, 2005, it was reported that America West Holdings Corporation was in talks with US Airways Group, which owned US Airways, regarding a possible merger with the latter. As reported in the press, US Airways would create a new holding company. Shares in that company would be given to America West Holdings shareholders as well as creditors of US Airways.

On May 19, 2005, America West Holdings Corporation and US Airways Group announced plans to merge their operations. Doug Parker, America West's chief executive, said the merger would create "the nation's first full-service airline with the customer-friendly pricing structure of a low-fare carrier." The proposed combined airline hoped to achieve profitability by cutting $600 million a year in costs. New equity investors, including Air Wisconsin Airways Corporation and ACE Aviation Holdings, the parent company of Air Canada, pledged to invest a total of $350 million in the new company. Airbus was also one of the investors. The combined airline would have primary hubs in Phoenix, Philadelphia and Charlotte; secondary hubs in Las Vegas and Pittsburgh; and focus cities in Boston, New York, Washington and Fort Lauderdale.

Later investments increased the total new equity raised to $565 million. Of that, ACE Aviation contributed $75 million for a 7% ownership stake. ACE Aviation also received a five-year, C$1.5 billion (US$1.19 billion) contract to maintain all of the merged company's mainline jets. ACE Aviation would also provide other services for the new company, including ground handling, training, and operation of regional jets. Such cooperation was expected to bring more traffic to Air Canada from the merged carriers, and lead to a code-sharing alliance in the future.

On September 13, 2005, America West's shareholders approved the merger with 95.5 percent in favor.

On September 16, 2005, the US Bankruptcy Court approved USAirways Chapter 11 Plan of Reorganization, clearing the way for the merger to be closed as soon as September 27, 2005. The merger was completed on September 27, 2005.

In the weeks leading up to the merger announcement, Phoenix-area media reported that local passengers worried about cuts in service to the city's Sky Harbor International Airport, where America West has its largest hub; such things have happened before when US Airways (or a predecessor company) merged with a regional airline. But while the new company would operate under the US Airways name, management would be led by America West Airlines managers and would be located at America West's Phoenix headquarters.

Under terms of the merger agreement, the America West board of Directors created two new entities. 1. A new US Airways Group was created to receive the bankrupt US Airways assets and form the new corporation. 2. America West Holdings was merged into Barbell Acquisition Corporation, a subsidiary of the new US Airways Group, on September 27, 2005. Through this transaction, America West Holdings became a wholly owned subsidiary of the new US Airways Group. The America West Holdings stockholders were required to authorize these changes. Upon completion the new US Airways Group would be owned by 37% of America West Holdings stockholders, 11% from the old US Airways Group debtholders, and 52% for new equity investors. Both of the merged airlines retained their names and continued operating until September 25, 2007, when America West's FAA certificate was merged into US Airways. At midnight on November 4, 2007, all America West flights listed in the Official Airline Guide and airline computer reservation systems were officially converted to operating under the US code at which time the airline's flight code HP was officially retired, and all operations under the former America West name were officially terminated.

== Divisions ==
- America West Airlines
- America West Express
- America West Vacations provided vacation packages that include airfare, accommodations and optional rental cars at selected destinations. These were only offered for destinations that America West flew to or offered as a code share destination.
