= Scott Kirby =

American airline executive

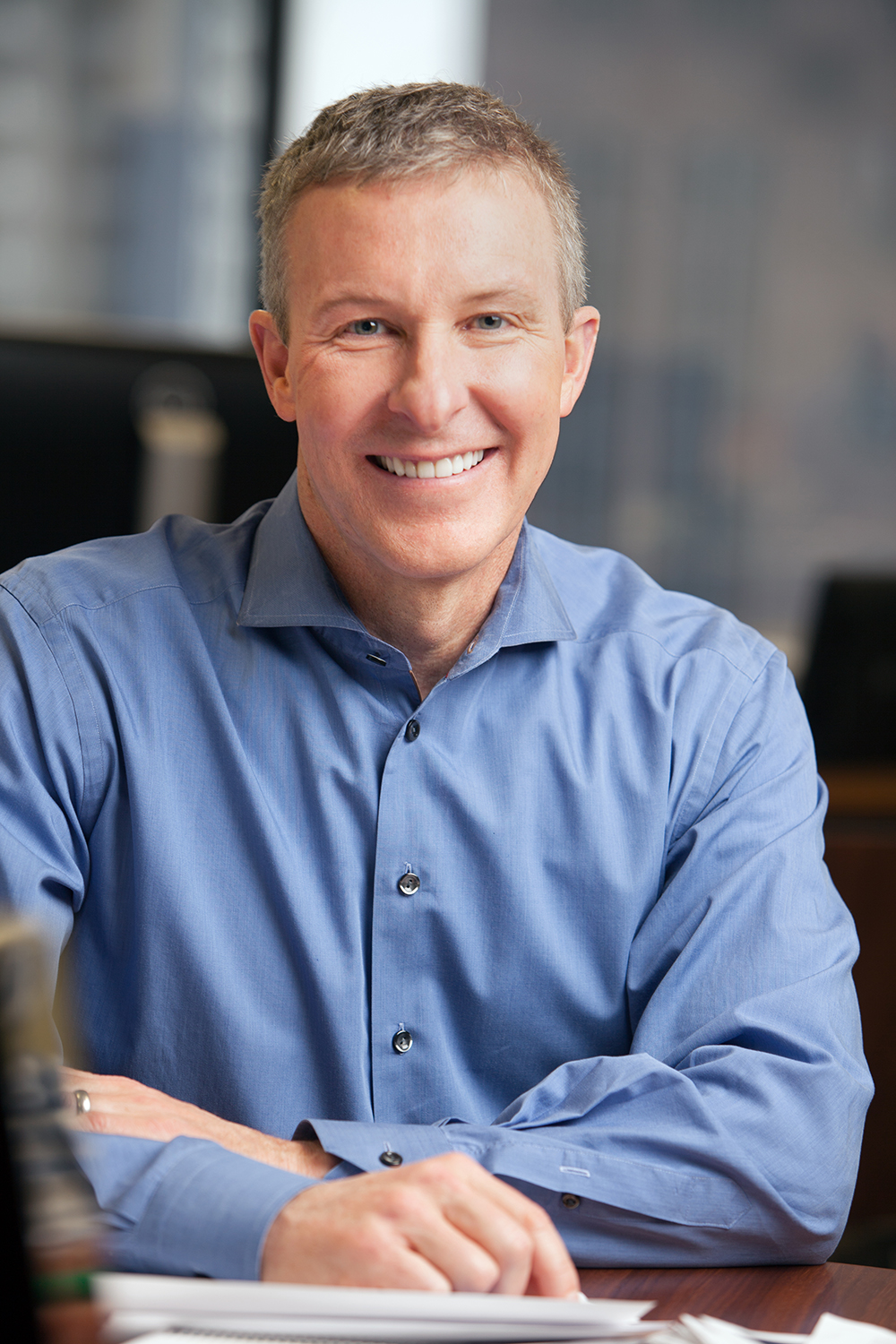
- Kirby in 2018
- Born: John Scott Kirby; August 13, 1967 (age 59)
- Education: United States Air Force Academy (BS); George Washington University (MS)
- Occupation: Business executive
- Employer: United Airlines
- Title: CEO of United Airlines
- Predecessor: Oscar Munoz
- Children: 7

John Scott Kirby (born August 13, 1967) is an American executive and the CEO of United Airlines. He was president of US Airways, American Airlines, and United Airlines, later being promoted as CEO.

== Early life and education ==
Kirby was raised in Rowlett, Texas, the oldest of six children. In high school, he played baseball and football, and had aspirations of becoming a professional athlete. He received a bachelor's degree in computer science and operations research in 1989 from the United States Air Force Academy, where he trained to be a pilot. He later earned a master's degree in operations research at the George Washington University.

== Career ==
Early in his career, Kirby worked at the Pentagon as a budget analyst for the United States Secretary of Defense for three years. He later worked for Sabre Decision Technologies (SDT), a subsidiary of AMR Corporation within the tourism and transport industries.

Kirby joined America West Airlines in 1995, working in various executive roles. Kirby began as president of US Airways in September 2006, after it merged with America West in 2005. He led US Airways' team for planning the merger. Kirby became president of American Airlines after the company merged with US Airways in 2013. He and American Airlines CEO Doug Parker worked closely together at America West, US Airways, and American.

Kirby became president of United Airlines in August 2016. He was announced as the successor to the CEO role in December 2019, following Oscar Munoz; his tenure started in May 2020. Kirby has been credited with expanding the airline's flight network, and restructuring hubs in Chicago, Denver, and Houston. Under his leadership, United maintains a 3 star Skytrax rating, which remains on par with standard US carriers, but falls noticeably short compared to its overseas Star Alliance competitors. Under his leadership, United Airlines achieved a 75% on-time performance rate, ranking them 9th (out of 18 airlines) in North America in terms of on-time performance.

In December 2020, Kirby was elected as chairman of the Star Alliance chief executive board (CEB), succeeding former chairman Pedro Heilbron.

In 2025, United faced significant operational disruptions at Newark Liberty International Airport, including widespread delays and cancellations, which the airline attributed to air traffic control staffing shortages and equipment issues; the company subsequently reduced scheduled flights at the airport. Kirby later said the disruption contributed to a decline in bookings and lower ticket prices for flights out of Newark.

In May 2025, Kirby drew criticism for remarks describing the traditional low-cost carrier business model as "dead" and characterizing the passenger experience as designed to "screw the customer."

In August 2025, a technology issue involving United's flight operations system led to a temporary ground stop at multiple major hubs and disrupted more than 1,000 flights. United claimed the disruption was caused by a "technology issue" related to its flight-data system and described the resulting delays as "controllable".

As of 2025, Kirby's compensation as CEO is $33.9 million. He is a member of The Business Council in Washington, D.C.

In a 2026 interview with the Wall Street Journal, Kirby claimed, "All the times I've gone to Europe, I've never once eaten a meal," in reference to travel hack suggestions towards combating jet lag. This was met with ridicule from online users who correlated this with United's seemingly sub-par food service relative to other carriers.

Kirby has said United will not further pursue merger deals with American Airlines or JetBlue.

== Personal life ==
Kirby is married and has seven children. He has donated money to both Republican and Democratic politicians, and donated to Steve Bullock's presidential campaign in 2020.

Business positions
Preceded by Robert Isom	President of American Airlines; 2016–2020	Succeeded by Brett J. Hart
Preceded by Oscar Munoz	CEO of United Airlines; 2020–present	Incumbent
