= Aeroplan =

Frequent-flyer program of Air Canada

- Type: Subsidiary
- Industry: Marketing/Consumer discretionary
- Founded: July 1984; 42 years ago
- Headquarters: Montreal, Quebec, Canada
- Owner: Air Canada
- Website: Aeroplan

Aeroplan is the frequent-flyer program owned by Air Canada, Canada's flag carrier. The Aeroplan program was created in July 1984 by Air Canada as an incentive program for its frequent flyer customers. In 2002 it was spun off as a separate corporate entity and eventually sold to Aimia. On May 11, 2017, Air Canada announced it plans to launch a new loyalty program to replace the Aeroplan program in 2020. On August 21, 2018, Air Canada, along with TD, CIBC and Visa, agreed to acquire Aeroplan from Aimia for CA$450 million in cash. There are approximately 5 million active members in the program. On August 11, 2020, Air Canada released details about its new loyalty program, which was a relaunch of Aeroplan. They launched their new Loyalty platform on November 08, 2020.

Aeroplan evolved into a loyalty marketing program with retail partners such as Home Hardware, Birks and Nestlé Canada. Aeroplan is also used by Air Creebec, Canadian North, Calm Air, and First Air. Internally, Aeroplan has deployed the MicroStrategy platform for business intelligence reporting and analytics for its personnel to analyze member information, track purchasing patterns, identify profiles of loyal members, and align its loyalty program with members' preferences.

Many Aeroplan members collect miles via credit cards. Credit cards were originally allocated to CIBC and Diners Club/enRoute, but were later offered to AMEX Bank of Canada, while Diners Club withdrew from the program. (The contract with CIBC expired at the end of 2013, and Aimia began a new partnership for credit cards with Toronto-Dominion Bank as the primary issuer, with CIBC relegated to a secondary role of January 1, 2014.)

In 2012, approximately 2.3 million rewards were issued to members, including more than 1.6 million flights on Air Canada or other Star Alliance carriers, which offer travel to more than 1,000 destinations worldwide.

== Corporate history ==
Logo from 2004 to 2020

When it was created in 1984, Aeroplan's operations were fully integrated with those of Air Canada. In 2002, Aeroplan was spun off as a wholly owned subsidiary of Air Canada.

In June 2005, Air Canada's parent company, ACE Aviation Holdings, sold 12.5% of Aeroplan for $250 million through an initial public offering, thereby creating the world's first publicly traded loyalty program, Aeroplan Income Fund, at a valuation of $2 billion.

On December 20, 2007, Aeroplan Income Fund acquired Loyalty Management Group, a loyalty marketing and customer-driven insight and analysis business that owns and operates Nectar, the UK's leading coalition loyalty program.

On May 28, 2008, ACE Aviation Holdings disposed of its remaining holdings in the fund for $438 million. As such, the Aeroplan program was no longer under direct control of Air Canada.

The corporate name was changed to Aimia in order to "reflect the fact that the program has grown and diversified into a comprehensive customer loyalty program with hundreds of participating retailers".

In November 2018, Aimia signed a definitive agreement with Air Canada to sell Aeroplan back to Air Canada for $450M in cash. This means Air Canada successfully sold Aeroplan for a combined $688 million, and repurchased it 10 years later for $450 million, for a profit of $238 million before expenses or inflation adjustments. Accounting for inflation yields a sale price of $832.2 in 2018 dollars, resulting in a profit of $382M before expenses.

== Competition ==
Aeroplan faces competition from many sources, including other airline reward programs (even within Star Alliance), various bank-affiliated credit card loyalty plans, and the Air Miles program.

== Mileage expiration ==
Aeroplan points expire if the member has no account activity for a period of 18 months. In the past, Aeroplan had a policy where all miles would expire after seven years, even if there was continued activity in the account. This policy has since been cancelled as of June 27, 2013.

=== Class action lawsuit ===
When miles expire, Aeroplan offers to restore the miles for a fee of $30 plus $0.01 per mile, which in some instances has resulted in charges of several thousand dollars for high-mileage members. Members have argued that Aeroplan had already been paid for the miles through the selling partner by virtue of the retail pricing and by fees charged for certain collector credit cards. As a result, on many blogs, members were upset that their miles had been emptied from their accounts.

In 2009, a class-action lawsuit was launched over Aeroplan's points expiration practices. The motion was filed on behalf of about seven plaintiffs across Canada, and thousands of petitioners registered for membership in the class. The lawsuit was settled in August 2018; the settlement included Air Canada returning points to eligible members.

== Status Levels ==
Prior to Air Canada's acquisition and relaunch of the program in 2020, Aeroplan rewarded users with status levels upon reaching a particular level of points accumulation in a given year. This program was called Aeroplan Distinction. The levels were Aeroplan Silver, Aeroplan Black, and Aeroplan Diamond, requiring 25,000, 50,000, and 100,000 miles, respectively. Most points qualified for these levels, including those from credit card spending and actual flying, but excluded points from credit card sign up bonuses, prizes, etc. At higher levels, members were rewarded with less expensive flight redemptions, priority access to call centers, and status matching with other rewards/loyalty programs.

The Aeroplan status program was a different program from the Air Canada Altitude rewards program, which grants status and rewards while dealing with Air Canada directly. With Aeroplan back in the Air Canada fold, the Silver/Black/Diamond status program was eliminated for a refreshed Altitude rewards program.

== Earn miles ==
1. Earn Aeroplan Miles with Air Canada: For travel on flights within Canada and between Canada and the continental United States (including Hawaii), 25% of miles flown are earned for Tango Class, 100% of miles flown are earned for Tango Plus and Executive Class Lowest, and 150% of miles flown are earned for Executive Class Flexible. For travel on flights for all other destinations worldwide, 100% of miles flown are earned for Tango Plus, 125% for Executive Class Lowest, and 150% for Executive Class Flexible.
2. Earn Aeroplan Miles when booking from AirCanada.com: Earn up to 1 Aeroplan Mile for every dollar spent when you purchase an eligible ticket at AirCanada.com (Canadian and US edition only). Earn 1 Aeroplan mile for every 3 dollars spent when you purchase an eligible Flight Pass at AirCanada.com (Canadian and US edition only).
3. Other partners: Aeroplan miles can be earned and used to redeem flights from Air Canada and partner airlines. Air Canada is part of the Star Alliance, a group of 28 airlines that co-operate to expand the offerings of each individual airline. Awards are redeemable on any one of these airlines. Each flight is allocated a certain number of "award seats" available to be used for award redemption. There are also travel and retail partners who award Aeroplan miles for being a customer of their services.

== Buy miles ==
Since May 2020, Air Canada allows to purchase or gift Aeroplan miles. Until then, buying miles was only available when booking flight rewards, which remains the same.

== Airline partners ==
=== Fully integrated airline partners ===
- Air Canada
- Air Canada Express
- Air Canada Rouge

=== Star Alliance partner airlines ===
- (Greece) Aegean Airlines
- Air China
- (Italy) Air Dolomiti
- Air India
- Air New Zealand
- (Japan) All Nippon Airways (ANA)
- (South Korea) Asiana Airlines
- (Austria) Austrian Airlines
- (Colombia) Avianca
- (Belgium) Brussels Airlines
- (Panama) Copa Airlines
- Croatia Airlines
- (Egypt) Egyptair
- (Ethiopia) Ethiopian Airlines
- (Taiwan) EVA Air
- (Poland) LOT Polish Airlines
- (Germany) Lufthansa
- (China) Shenzhen Airlines
- Singapore Airlines
- (South Africa) South African Airways
- (Switzerland) Swiss International Air Lines
- TAP Air Portugal
- (Thailand) Thai Airways International
- (Turkey) Turkish Airlines
- (United States) United Airlines

=== Other partners ===
- (Republic of Ireland) Aer Lingus
- (Canada) Air Creebec
- (Canada) Air Inuit
- Air Mauritius
- Air Serbia
- (Brazil) Azul Brazilian Airlines
- (Vietnam) Bamboo Airways
- (Canada) Bearskin Airlines
- (Canada) Calm Air
- (Canada) Canadian North
- (Hong Kong) Cathay Pacific
- (Canada) Central Mountain Air
- (Germany) Discover Airlines
- (Switzerland) Edelweiss Air
- (United Arab Emirates) Emirates
- (United Arab Emirates) Etihad Airways
- (Germany) Eurowings
- (United Arab Emirates) Flydubai
- (Brazil) GOL Linhas Aéreas Inteligentes
- (Bahrain) Gulf Air
- (Canada) Harbour Air
- (Canada) Helijet
- (China) Juneyao Air
- (Lebanon) Middle East Airlines
- (Greece) Olympic Air
- Oman Air
- (Canada) PAL Airlines
- (Sri Lanka) SriLankan Airlines
- (Turkey) SunExpress
- Virgin Australia

=== Former partners ===
- (Mexico) Aeromar
- (Sweden) (Norway) (Denmark) Scandinavian Airlines (SAS)
- (India) Vistara

== June 2013 announcements ==
On June 27, 2013, it was announced that Aimia had signed a conditional agreement with Toronto-Dominion Bank (TD) to become a credit-card partner as of January 1, 2014, and that Aimia would seek to terminate its decades-long relationship with CIBC. After the announcement, Aimia's stock rose by 11 percent.

In response, CIBC suggested that Aimia was attempting to nullify CIBC's right of first refusal. CIBC had already been hinting that it was dissatisfied with its arrangement with Aeroplan and might start its own loyalty program.

Aimia's conditional deal with TD would last ten years and involve an up-front payment of $100 million. Aimia said that CIBC had until August 9, 2013, to exercise its right of first refusal by matching the terms of the proposed TD contract.

In another announcement, Aimia cancelled Aeroplan's "seven-year mileage redemption policy". The policy had originally come into effect at the beginning of 2007, and provided that all miles would expire if unused after seven years, with the accumulated mileage of all customers as of January 1, 2007, expiring at the end of 2013. Aimia CEO Rupert Duchesne told Bloomberg news service that people had been worried there would be a run on Aimia's cash flow in 2013, but cancelling the seven-year expiration policy removes that worry.

In addition, on June 27, Aeroplan announced the launch of Distinction, a tiered recognition program that rewards top accumulating members based on total Aeroplan Miles earned across all coalition partners, with preferential mileage levels for redemption, bonus mile offers, and exclusive privileges. Benefits begin as of January 1, 2014, and include three status levels based on a member's total eligible mileage accumulation during the calendar year: dSilver (25,000 miles), dBlack (50,000 miles), and dDiamond (100,000 miles).
