= ACE Aviation Holdings =

Canadian holding company

ACE Aviation Holdings Inc.
- Company type: Public company
- Traded as: TSX: ACE.A, ACE.B (Note: The company has been moved to the NEX board of the TSX Venture Exchange. These are former trading symbols.); NEX: ACE.H
- Industry: Airline (NAICS 481000)
- Founded: 2004; 22 years ago in Montreal, Quebec
- Defunct: March 15, 2024
- Fate: Dissolved
- Headquarters: Montreal, Quebec, Canada
- Key people: Robert Milton (chairman, president & CEO) (until 2012)
- Products: Passenger air & Cargo travel
- Revenue: ▲US$10.135 billion (2006) (CA$13.359 billion); ▲US$9.438 billion (2005) (CA$12.452 billion)
- Net income: ▲US$0.392 billion (2006) (CA$0.517 billion); ▲US$0.251 billion (2005) (CA$0.331 billion)
- Number of employees: 33,090 (2008)
- Website: aceaviation.com

ACE Aviation Holdings Inc. was a Canadian holding company that was the former parent company of Air Canada. It was headquartered in Montreal. In 2012, the company signified its intent to dissolve, and was dissolved in 2024.

== History ==
ACE Aviation Holdings was created as Air Canada emerged from bankruptcy in 2004; By the end of 2005, ACE completed restructuring and achieved reduced costs through outsourcing, automation and process simplification. One of the more significant changes was the merging of its six small airlines into Air Canada and Air Canada Jazz. ACE was not only a solution to Air Canada's bankruptcy, but also a strategic move by Robert Milton to create a portfolio of independent air transportation services companies out of what was Air Canada.

Among the companies in addition to Air Canada which was taken public after formation of ACE was the frequent flyer program Aeroplan. Aeroplan's initial public offering valued the company at US$2 billion, which was several times the valuation of the airline itself.

In 2005, ACE contributed US$75 million in equity investment to the merger of America West Holdings and US Airways Group, which resulted in US Airways emerging from its second bankruptcy.

In 2008, ACE completed its divestment of Aeroplan and Air Canada's regional airline affiliate, Jazz. After these divestments, ACE retained a 75% stake in Air Canada and a 23% stake in Air Canada Technical Services.

On May 9, 2012, the company received a certificate of intent to dissolve, marking the end of any future activities by the company.

The company planned a wind up and distribution of its assets back to its shareholders by no earlier than mid-2013. While all of the core aviation assets have been disposed of, the corporate website continues to operate until all assets are fully disposed of. The company no longer has a board and executives, with all liquidation being managed by outside party Ernst & Young. As of 31 December 2019, filings state that ACE Aviation Holdings consisted of only cash and cash equivalents amounting to a total of CA$6,7 million.

On March 15, 2024, the company was dissolved.

== Former operating divisions ==
- Aeroplan – former in-house rewards program sold off and was owned by Aimia, later rebought by Air Canada.
- Air Canada – airline sold off
- Air Canada Cargo – transferred to control under Air Canada
- Air Canada Ground Handling Services – transferred to Air Canada
- Jazz Aviation LP – sold off and now owned by Chorus Aviation and operates as contractor for Air Canada
- Aveos Fleet Performance Inc. - formerly as Air Canada Technical Services before being renamed in 2008, acquired Air Canada Mechanics in 2011 and ceased operations in 2012 with remaining assets (equipment and Montreal facility) then acquired by Lockheed Martin Canada and AJW Technique.
- Air Canada Vacations – transferred to Air Canada
