= American Youth Philharmonic Orchestras =

The American Youth Philharmonic Orchestras (AYPO) are a group of youth orchestras in the Washington metropolitan area. The group consists of three full orchestras (the American Youth Philharmonic, Symphonic Orchestra, and Concert Orchestra), and four string orchestras (Sinfonietta, String Ensemble, Prelude Strings, and Debut Orchestra), along with several chamber ensembles and community outreach organizations. Currently, over 650 young musicians take part in AYPO programs.

== History ==
The orchestras were founded as the youth division of the Fairfax Symphony in 1965 with a single ensemble, the Northern Virginia Youth Symphony. The orchestra became independent of the Fairfax Symphony in 1978, and in 1993 changed the name of its main ensemble to the American Youth Philharmonic. The organization has steadily grown since its founding, with the most recent constituent orchestra, the Sinfonietta, being founded in 2021. The organization is among the most prominent in the Washington metropolitan area, performing at a number of prominent venues including Carnegie Hall and the Kennedy Center. In the past, it has also toured internationally to participate in programs such as the Aberdeen International Youth Festival. AYPO also conducts an outreach program to under-served students in Alexandria City Public Schools, called Music Buddies.

Currently, the organization is led by Miranda Martin Southwood. AYPO's board of directors includes parents of young musicians in AYPO, including business figures such as Ben Baldanza.
