= AMR Corporation =

Defunct airline holding company

- Type: Public
- Traded as: NYSE: AMR (until 2012); OTCQB: AAMRQ (until merger)
- Industry: Aviation
- Founded: October 1, 1982
- Defunct: December 8, 2013
- Fate: Chapter 11 bankruptcy, merged with US Airways Group
- Successor: American Airlines Group
- Headquarters: Fort Worth, Texas, U.S.
- Area served: Worldwide
- Key people: Robert Crandall (president and CEO; 1982–1998); Donald J. Carty (president and CEO; 1998–2003); Gerard Arpey (president and CEO; 2003–2011); Thomas W. Horton (president and CEO; 2011–2013)
- Services: Airline services
- Revenue: ▲US$24.855 billion (2012)
- Operating income: ▼ −US$1.172 billion (2011)
- Net income: ▼ −US$1.876 billion (2012)
- Total assets: ▼US$23.51 billion (2012)
- Total equity: ▼ −US$7.111 billion (2011)
- Number of employees: 77,750 (2012)
- Website: www.aa.com

AMR Corporation was an American airline holding company based in Fort Worth, Texas, United States, which was the parent company of American Airlines, American Eagle Airlines, AmericanConnection and Executive Airlines. AMR filed for Chapter 11 bankruptcy protection in November 2011. The company emerged from bankruptcy on December 9, 2013, and at the same time announced that it would merge with US Airways Group to form a new company, American Airlines Group.

== History ==
AMR Corporation was formed in 1982, as part of American Airlines' non-bankruptcy reorganization into a Delaware corporation, its name derived from American Airlines's former ticker symbol on the New York Stock Exchange. In 1984, various subsidiaries previously owned by American Airlines merged and created AMR Energy Corporation; it was involved in creating oil and natural gas resources. In 1986, AMR announced that it would be acquiring Air California's parent company, ACI Holdings, for $225 million.

In 1994, AMR succeeded in achieving profitability, after failing to produce it for three years in a row. Sustained work to reduce its supplier base has been identified as one contributing cause: in 1995, AMR obtained goods and services from 7200 suppliers, but reduced this number by 30% in 1996 and by a further 16% in 1997, achieving cost savings as a result of this consolidation.

In 1998, the company announced that it would sell three of its subsidiaries and focus solely on the core airline businesses. AMR purchased Trans World Airlines (TWA) in 2001, for $742 million. With the acquisition, American became the largest airline in the world and surpassed United Airlines.

On November 29, 2011, AMR Corporation filed for Chapter 11 reorganization bankruptcy with $4 billion of cash.

The decision came as the airline tried to "achieve a cost and debt structure that is industry competitive and thereby assure its long-term viability and ability to continue delivering a world-class travel experience for its customers", the company said in a statement. American Airlines stated that despite the filing it was continuing normal operations. Chairman and CEO Gerard Arpey stepped down and was replaced by company president Thomas W. Horton.

American was the last of the remaining legacy airlines in the US to file for bankruptcy, and thus there are no remaining legacy carriers that have not taken advantage of Chapter 11.

The Air Transport Association group said that unofficial research states that AMR was the 100th airline company to go into bankruptcy protection since 1990.

On December 2, 2011, AMR Corporation was replaced by Alaska Air Group in the Dow Jones Transportation Average.

In February 2012 the company announced that in order to cut operating costs and boost revenue, it would eliminate 13,000 jobs, which amounted to 18 percent (including 15 percent management positions) of American Airline's 73,800 employees. This was projected to cut 20 percent—$2 billion—of operating costs and raise revenue by $1 billion. Since 2001, accumulative losses of the company were $11 billion.

On February 1, 2012, Horton announced that they would be cutting 13,000 jobs and restructuring pension benefits, after losing $884 million in the first nine months of 2011 and $904 million in December 2011 alone.

=== Merger with US Airways ===
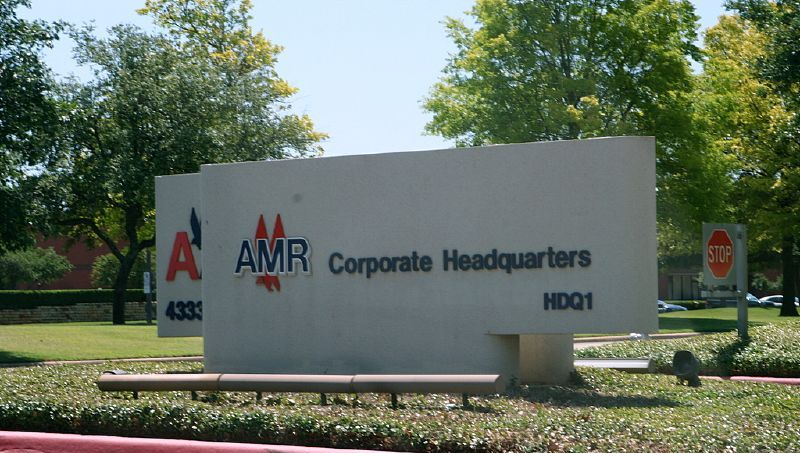
The sign of the headquarters of AMR Corporation replaced with American Airlines Group sign

In January 2012, US Airways Group expressed interest to take over American Airlines, followed by the AMR CEO stating, in March, that American was open to a merger with US Airways. US Airways told some American Airlines creditors that merging the two carriers could yield more than $1.5 billion a year in added revenue and cost savings.

On 20 April 2012, American Airlines' three unions said they supported a proposed merger between American and US Airways.

In July 2012, American announced capacity cuts due to the grounding of several aircraft associated with its bankruptcy and lack of pilots due to retirements. American's regional airline, American Eagle, stated it would retire 35 to 40 regional jets as well as its Saab turboprop fleet.

As of September 2012, American's unions were looking to merge with another airline. Reports were the possible merger partners AMR was looking at were, US Airways, JetBlue, Alaska Airlines, Frontier and Virgin America. Indeed, in a July 12 court filing US Airways said it supported an American Airlines request to extend a period during which only American could file a bankruptcy reorganization plan ("exclusivity period"); in the filing US Airways disclosed that it was an American Airlines creditor and "prospective merger partner. On August 31, 2012, US Airways CEO Doug Parker announced that American Airlines and US Airways had signed a nondisclosure agreement, in which the airlines would discuss their financials and a possible merger."

On February 14, 2013, AMR and US Airways Group officially announced that the two companies would merge to form the largest airline in the world. In the deal, which closed in the third quarter of 2013, bondholders of AMR would own 72% of the new company and US Airways shareholders would own the remaining 28%. The combined airline would carry the American Airlines name and branding, while the US Airways' management team, including CEO Doug Parker, would retain most operational management positions. Headquarters for the new airline was consolidated at American's current headquarters in Fort Worth, Texas. AMR president and CEO Thomas W. Horton was replaced as CEO by the current CEO of US Airways, Doug Parker. Horton remained as chairman of the merged business, while US Airways president Scott Kirby became president of the merged company.

== Subsidiaries and divisions ==
- American Airlines Inc
  - Admirals Club, Inc.
  - American Airlines de Mexico, S.A.
  - American Airlines de Venezuela, S.A.
  - American Airlines Marketing Services LLC
  - American Airlines Realty (NYC) Holdings, Inc.
  - American Airlines Vacations LLC
  - American Aviation Supply LLC
  - Packcall Limited
  - AA Real Estate Holding GP LLC
  - AA Real Estate Holding L.P.
  - TransWorld Airlines (TWA, LLC)
  - Reno Air, Inc.
  - American Airlines IP Licensing Holding, LLC
  - Texas Aero Engine Services, L.L.C, dba TAESL *
- Americas Ground Services, Inc.
  - Aerodespachos de Colombia, SA (AERCOL SA)
  - Caribbean Dispatch Services, Ltd.
  - American Airlines, Division de Servicios Aeroportuarios (R.D.), S.A. (DSA)
  - International Ground Services, S.A. de C.V. (IGS)
- AMR Eagle Holding Corporation
  - American Eagle Airlines Inc. a regional feeder airline for AA
  - Eagle Aviation Services
  - Executive Airlines Inc., operating American Eagle's ATR aircraft fleet
    - Executive Ground Services, Inc.
    - Business Express Airlines, Inc.
- Avion Assurance Ltd.
- PMA Investment Subsidiary, Inc.
- SC Investment, Inc. Holding company for less than 0.5% interest in Aerolíneas Argentinas
- AMR had a 20% share of defunct Aeroperlas

=== Fleet ===
AMR Corporation fleet

American Airlines operates 605 aircraft as of April 2012 with an additional 451 on order. The new planes will consist of 260 A320neo from Airbus and 200 Boeing 737s over the next five years. It will also take options and purchase rights for up to 465 additional planes through 2025.

American Eagle Airlines, AMR's regional subsidiary operates 284 aircraft including 39 which are operated by Executive Airlines, another subsidiary of AMR Corporation.

Non-AMR Corporation fleet

Fifteen aircraft are operated by Chautauqua Airlines under the American Connection brand. Chautauqua is not owned by AMR but operates aircraft for American Eagle.

== Aviation business subsidiaries and divisions ==
- American Airlines Cargo
- American Airlines C.R. Smith Museum, a museum of commercial aviation in Fort Worth
- American Airlines Facilities
- American Airlines Travel Academy, a school for travel industry professionals
- AmericanConnection (operator Chautauqua Airlines is independent of AMR)
- American Airlines Flight Academy, a flying school
- Flagship University, a corporate conference and training center in Fort Worth.

== American Airlines Foundation ==
AMR sponsors the AMR/American Airlines Foundation, a grant-making foundation which supports charitable causes in cities served by AA, in particular the Dallas/Fort Worth Metroplex, Chicago, Illinois, Miami, Florida, Saint Louis, Missouri, and San Juan, Puerto Rico.

== Property ==
AMR Corporation owns a five-story townhouse, London Residence LON6526, in Cottesmore Gardens, Kensington, London. As of 2011, it is worth $30 million U.S. dollars. Many large companies own or rent property for use of executives who are working abroad. When AMR Corporation requested Chapter 11 bankruptcy protection, LON6526 was one of the eight owned properties the company declared. The airline purchased the complex in 1992 for £6.3 million British pounds (US$9.8 million). Nina Campbell, an interior designer, had renovated the property. An AMR spokesperson said that AMR may sell the townhouse. Richard Tilton, a lawyer with specialization in bankruptcy and the director of Sheldon Good & Co., compared the property to the "corporate jets that the executives at GM and Chrysler were forced to give up", and predicted that such "symbols of corporate suite excess" were unlikely to survive the Chapter 11 reorganization.

== AMR Corporation's former certificated airline holding acquisitions ==
- Air Cal
- Command Airways
- Metroflight
- Reno Air
- Simmons Airlines
- TWA Airlines LLC
- Wings West Airlines
