= Aveos Fleet Performance =

Maintenance provider of aircraft parts

Aveos Fleet Performance Inc.
- Industry: Aerospace
- Founded: 1937 (as Air Canada Technical Services); 1983 (Aeroman)
- Headquarters: Montreal, Quebec, Canada Facilities: in Canada: Montreal, Toronto, Winnipeg, Vancouver; in El Salvador: San Salvador
- Number of employees: About 3,500
- Subsidiaries: Aeroman

Aveos Fleet Performance Inc. (Aveos) was a maintenance, repair and overhaul (MRO) provider that serviced airframes, components, and engines. The company had facilities in Montreal, Toronto, Winnipeg, and Vancouver.

On March 19, 2012, Aveos filed for creditors' protection under CCAA, citing corporate finances and relations with its main client, Air Canada.

In January 2013, Lockheed Martin Canada purchased tools and equipment at auction for two lines of aircraft engines, along with the Aveos building near Montreal Trudeau International Airport.

== History ==
=== Air Canada Technical Services ===
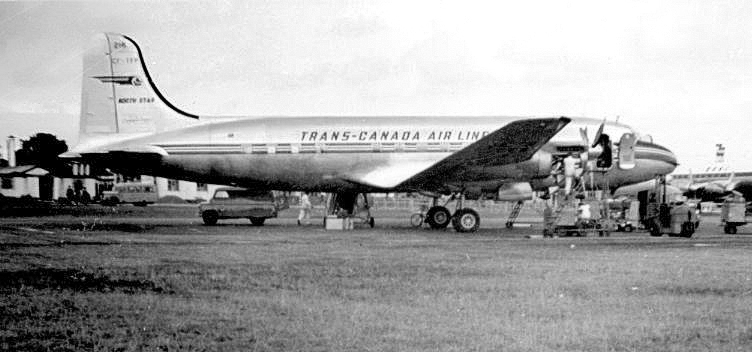
Trans-Canada Airlines (London Airport, Heathrow)

Aveos was created at the founding of Trans-Canada Airlines (TCA) in 1937 when it was the company's in-house maintenance division. TCA was renamed Air Canada in 1965 and a corporate reorganization in 1968 saw the maintenance division grouped under Air Canada Technical Services (ACTS).

Beginning in 1968, ACTS provided maintenance, repair and overhaul (MRO) services to non-Air Canada customers. With Air Canada entering bankruptcy protection in 2003, the relation between the airline and others subsidiaries like ACTS was affected. In 2004, ACE Aviation Holdings became the parent company of Air Canada and with this restructuring, a decision was taken to separate Air Canada Technical Services from Air Canada the airline. In 2005, ACTS became a member of the Airbus MRO Network.

In February 2007, Air Canada Technical Services reached an agreement to acquire 80% of Aeroman, the MRO affiliate of TACA Airlines, a Central American airline. On October 16, 2007, ACTS officially became independent when US investment firms Sageview Capital and KKR Private Equity Investors acquired a 70% stake in the company. This made these two US companies were the original investors of ACTS. On September 23, 2008, ACTS was rebranded and formally adopted Aveos Fleet Performance Inc. as their new name, as part of the process of becoming an independent company. The origin of the name Aveos comes from "av" which refers to the company's roots in aviation while "eos" signifies new beginning.

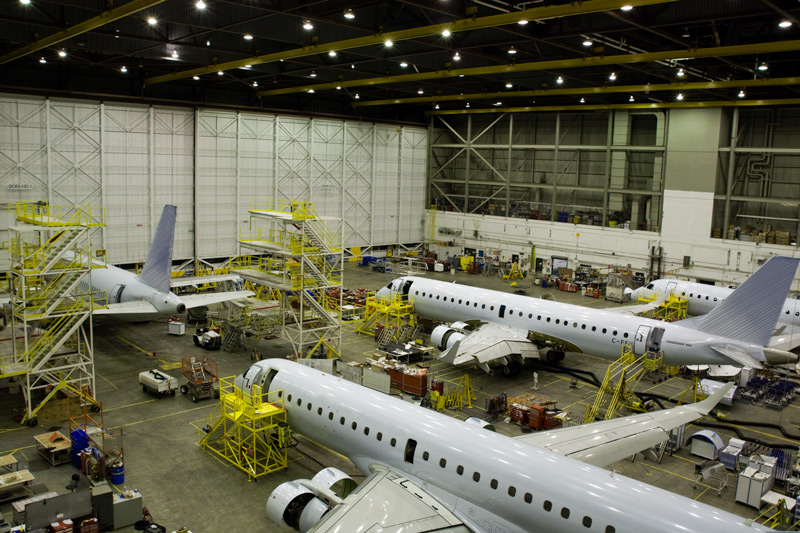
Aveos hangar in Winnipeg, Manitoba, Canada

=== Aveos ===
Aveos, with its subsidiary Aeroman in El Salvador, provided nose-to-tail maintenance for Boeing, Airbus and Embraer aircraft. They worked with companies such as General Electric, CFM International, Hamilton Sundstrand and Honeywell. Aveos announced their new president and CEO, Joe Kolshak, on April 27, 2011.

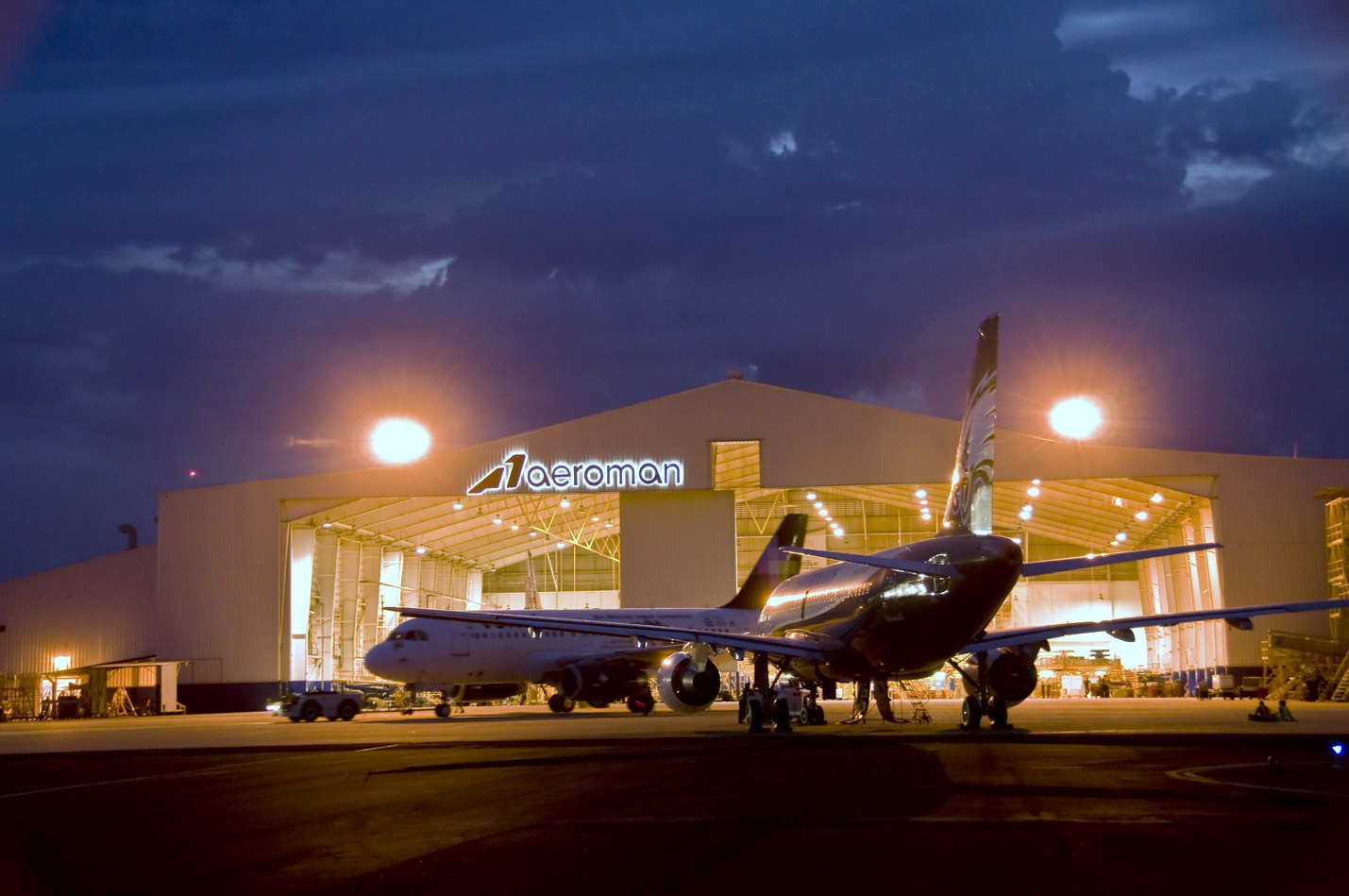
Aeroman hangar in El Salvador

=== Aeroman ===
Aeroman was established in 1983 to provide maintenance services for Taca Airlines. In 1992, Aeroman was certified by the Federal Aviation Administration(FAA) and in 2005 became a member of the Airbus MRO Network. As Aveos' subsidiary, Aeroman provides MRO services for narrow-body aircraft and if currently expanding its facilities. Located in San Salvador, its facilities are accessed by carriers from the US, Caribbean, Mexico, Central and South America.

==== Growth and Future Plans ====
In August 2009, Aeroman announced its intention to construct a new hangar at its facility in El Salvador at a cost of about $20 million, according to Ernesto Ruiz, CEO of Aeroman. The new hangar would create an eighth production line, toward its goal in the following seven years to have 16 production lines, generating 3,000 jobs, up from its then-current payroll of 1,600.

As of February 2011, Aeroman had reached the milestone of 1,000 checks (major maintenance orders completed) since its founding in 1983, with employment of 1,800. Its customer base included Southwest, Volaris, United Airlines, Iberia, Aerolineas Argentinas, Tame, Lan, and others.

==== Expansion after Aveos Liquidation ====
Aeroman remains open: its El Salvador operations are not part of the Aveos bankruptcy filing. Aeroman does not work on Air Canada planes, though the airline is now looking at lower-cost repair service options.

Aeroman's parent company, Aero Technical Support & Services Holdings, is expanding in El Salvador even as its Canadian arm liquidates its assets after terminating more than 2,600 employees. According to Ernesto Ruiz, Chief Executive Officer of Aeroman, "Aeroman is a completely separate entity and is not impacted in any material way by the CCAA filing in Canada. We are extremely pleased with how well Aeroman is doing; we are adding a new hangar to accommodate three new lines for narrow body aircraft that will be operational by the end of March 2012." Ruiz also said, "We have some 1,800 employees either working on the aircraft or in support functions. We have more than 200 technicians in training for these new lines of production, which will bring Aeroman to more than 2,000 employees once they are in operation."

== Restructuring ==
=== Refinancing and Ownership Changes ===
As of the end of 2009, according to an audit of Aveos conducted by KPMG, Aveos owed at least $715 million to a consortium of lenders, including Lehman Brothers Inc. and Woodbridge Investments Inc. In early 2010, a group of 11 lenders took control of Aveos from Kohlberg Kravis Roberts & Co. and Sageview Capital LLC. As part of the associated recapitalization plan, debt was reduced to $75 million from $800 million, and certain lenders were to provide $75 million in working capital in the arrangement set to close by the end of the first quarter of 2010, when Air Canada was due to acquire a minority interest in Aveos. According to then-Aveos chief executive officer Chahram Bolouri in an interview. "We have recapitalized the company without having to go through bankruptcy protection. We've positioned Aveos to be in good shape."

On October 31, 2011, Aveos announced that it had raised $50 million in financing from a diverse group of existing lenders and private bankers. Peter Timotheatos, Aveos Chief Financial Officer, stated, "We presented our plans to various lenders over a year ago and we are very pleased with the outcome today. It demonstrates a tremendous vote of confidence in the company's strategic direction and in the future of our business."

=== Acquisition of Air Canada Mechanics ===
In a process that ended in April 2011, as part of Air Canada's spinoff of Aveos, roughly 4,000 Air Canada aircraft mechanics officially picked one of seven choices before them, including staying with Air Canada, transferring to Aveos, retiring, or resigning. The first choice of 2,136 of them was to stay with Air Canada. The airline was to keep line maintenance – routine checks – while Aveos was to specialize in overhaul maintenance. The International Association of Machinists and Aerospace Workers, which represents 11,000 Air Canada employees, contended that the spinoff of Aveos by Air Canada into a stand-alone entity in 2007 was illegal; union leaders also feared that Air Canada would send its heavy maintenance to low-wage countries or non-union shops after 2013, when its contract with Aveos expires.

The previous month, the International Association of Machinists and Aerospace Workers had expressed concern that hundreds of jobs in Canada at Aveos were at risk of being shifted to lower-wage jurisdictions at competing repair shops in places such as Nashville, Plattsburgh, N.Y., and Rome, N.Y., and to Central America. Marcel St-Jean, president of IAMAW Local 1751 in Montreal, said he was especially concerned about Aveos' expansion plans for its Aeroman division in San Salvador, the capital of El Salvador. "We are very scared that jobs will go to El Salvador. After mid-2013, there isn't any obligation on Air Canada's part to do heavy maintenance on the planes in Canada." In 2009, Canadian employees at Aveos earned between $1,700 and $5,500 a month, depending on their skills and experience, compared with $350 to $1,200 a month at Aeroman.

== Shutdown ==
=== Bankruptcy Filing ===
In March 2012, a week before Aveos made its bankruptcy filing, the Montreal Gazette reported that, according to unnamed Aveos insiders, the company was no longer making employees' pension contributions or maintaining their benefit packages, was losing business, and was forced by several suppliers to pay cash rather than the usual 30-, 60-, or 90-day bill invoices. In rebuttal, a statement released by Aveos read "Aveos has made and continues to make employee and employer payments to its pension plan in accordance with its obligations under the Federal Pension Benefits Standards Act."

On Sunday, March 18, 2012, Aveos padlocked its doors, instructing many of its 1,800 Montreal employees to leave the premises at 5:30 p.m. and take their tools and belongings with them. According to several emails and voicemails to the Montreal Gazette, workers were told to contact the company for further instructions.

On Monday, March 19, 2012, Aveos filed for creditor protection, laid off more than 2,600 workers, and shut plants in Montreal, Winnipeg and Vancouver. The Winnipeg plant was scheduled to shut down and lose 412 jobs, the Vancouver operation would close and shed 356 jobs while the Montreal site was likely to have at least 1,000 positions axed. According to the Companies' Creditors Arrangement Act filing in Quebec Superior Court, Aveos lost $48.9 million and its liabilities exceeded the book value of assets by $219.8 million. The company had a pension solvency deficit of $26 million at the end of 2011.

In the court filing, Aveos laid the blame for its troubles squarely on Air Canada, which it accuses of refusing to deliver planes for repairs and of soliciting undercutting bids from rivals for work. Air Canada provides more than 85 per cent of Aveos's revenues and has a contract with Aveos that runs to 2013. Air Canada did not directly address the key issues of providing planes or undercutting bids, but said in a general statement that Air Canada "is very disappointed by the Aveos announcement."

Approximately 1,800 of the affected employees were based in Montreal, while 350 were in Winnipeg and 250 were in Vancouver, according to the International Association of Machinists and Aerospace Workers. "The maintenance component that supplies work to the Air Canada fleet has effectively ceased operations," according to Lorne Hammerberg, the IAMAW's local president in Winnipeg.

=== Liquidation ===
On March 20, 2012, after getting permission from the Quebec Superior Court, Aveos said that it would immediately begin the process of liquidating its Canadian aircraft maintenance business, putting virtually all of the company's 2,600 employees across Canada out of work. About 160 employees will remain to oversee the liquidation process. According to chairman Eugene Davis, "The company had no viable option but to cease operations. We deeply regret the job losses and the impact this decision has on our employees in Canada and extend our sincere gratitude to them for their dedication and service over the years."

Air Canada said it could be forced to cancel flights and strand thousands of passengers if Aveos was unable to complete repairs to several planes. The airline's lawyers argued in vain Monday for a Quebec Superior Court judge to order Aveos to not lay off more workers and to meet its obligations to complete the aircraft repairs. Justice Mark Schrager denied an Air Canada request that would have forced Aveos to maintain operations and employment to complete the contracted repairs. "Accommodation, if there is any between Aveos and Air Canada, is going to be made in a boardroom, not a courtroom," he said before granting creditor protection Monday.

=== Aveos ownership ===
As of March 2012, the ownership of Aveos has not been made public. Court documents state only that the company is privately held and "domiciled" in the Cayman Islands and Luxembourg. In a January 2010 interview with the Montreal Gazette, at the end of the Aveos debt restructuring and change of ownership from Kohlberg Kravis Roberts and Sageview Capital, the then-president of Aveos, Chahram Bolouri, would only say that the new shareholders were largely former creditors, "about four or five" banks and hedge funds, mostly from the U.S.; for its part, ACE Aviation Holdings, the parent company of Air Canada, reportedly had its own ownership in Aveos reduced to about 17%.

By some reports, Aveos and Aeroman are both owned by Aero Technical Support & Services Holdings, based in Luxembourg. According to one report, that company in turn has as shareholders Sageview Capital and KKR (Kohlberg Kravis Roberts) Private Equity Investors.
