= Donald J. Carty =

Canadian-American businessman

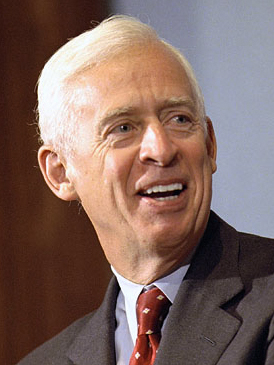
- Carty in 2002
- Born: July 23, 1946 (age 80); Toronto, Ontario, Canada
- Education: Queen's University; Harvard Business School
- Occupation: Businessman

Donald J. Carty, OC (born July 23, 1946) is a Canadian-American businessman who is chair of Porter Airlines. Carty also is a director of VMWare and Betterez. He was previously chairman and chief executive officer (CEO) of AMR Corporation, the parent company of American Airlines, from 1998 to 2003. He is the past Chairman of Virgin America and E-Rewards, Inc. (now known as Dynata). Carty is also a past director of Dell, CN Rail, Sears, Placer Dome, Barrick Gold, CHC Helicopters, Brinker International, Talisman Energy, EMC Corporation (now known as Dell EMC), Hawaiian Airlines and Gluskin Sheff. In January 2007, Carty became the vice chairman and chief financial officer of Dell. On June 13, 2008, Carty retired from day-to-day operations, but stayed on as a director. He is a past chairman of Big Brothers Big Sisters of America, a former member of the board of trustees of both Southern Methodist University and Queen's University and of the board of directors of the Dallas Center for the Performing Arts Foundation and the Dallas Theater Center. He is on the executive board of the SMU Cox School of Business.

== Biography ==
Carty (right) with Miami-Dade Mayor Alex Penelas in November 1999, at an event celebrating terminal construction at Miami International Airport

Born in Toronto, Ontario, on July 23, 1946, Carty attended Queen's University and Harvard Business School. He took US citizenship in the early 1980s. He worked for Air Canada and the Canadian Pacific Railway before joining American, although he was CEO for CP Air from 1985 to 1987. At American, he was controller, and later executive vice president for finance and planning under CEO Robert Crandall, before becoming CEO of AMR himself in 1998.

In April 2003, in the long wake of the September 11 attacks and facing an industry beset by terrorism and hard economic times, Carty and his executive board wanted to strike a cost-cutting deal with American's labor unions, intended to mitigate AMR's upcoming $1 billion first-quarter loss. The deal—which was at the time the largest corporate restructuring outside of bankruptcy in American history—almost unraveled several days later, when unions learned that at the same time that American Airlines was demanding $1.6 billion in concessions from its unionized employees, the company gave $40 million in perks to its top executives, Although many other airlines had similar retention bonus arrangements, to facilitate a final agreement between the company and the unions, Carty voluntarily stepped down. He was replaced as CEO by Gerard Arpey, and as chairman by Edward A. Brennan.

Carty was appointed as Chairman of Virgin America on February 6, 2006. On February 2 of that year, Toronto-based Porter Airlines, in the process of starting up a regional service out of the downtown Toronto island airport, announced that Carty would simultaneously be its chairman. Carty has been on Hawaiian Airlines' board of directors three times; 2004–2007, 2008–2011, and 2016-2022, until Alaska Air Group completed its acquisition of the airline.

In January 2007, Carty became the vice chairman and CFO of Dell Inc., replacing James Schneider. On May 19, 2008, Dell announced that Carty would step down on June 13, to be succeeded by longtime General Electric executive Brian Gladden, chief executive of SABIC Innovative Plastics, formerly GE Plastics. Carty remained as a director and vice chairman of Dell.

In 1999, Board Alert named him one of the year's Outstanding Directors. In 2002, he was made an Officer of the Order of Canada. In September 2002, Carty was appointed by President Bush to the National Infrastructure Advisory Council where he was until the summer of 2005. He is a recipient of an Honorary Doctor of Law from Queen's University.

== Family life ==
Carty was in born in Toronto, growing up in Toronto and Montreal, with 4 brothers and a sister. In 1969, he met Sharon Louise Smith in Boston while at Harvard, and they married in 1970. They had three children while living in Montreal, Michael Patrick, Catherine Rebecca, and William Robert Douglas. Don and Sharon were divorced in 1994.

He was remarried in 1998 in Dallas to Eva Ana Maria Rodriguez. They have two children, Michael Malin Payne and Donald John Jr. They currently live in Dallas, Texas, and spend time in Newport Beach, California, and on Hurd's Lake in Greater Madawaska, Ontario.

Business positions
Preceded by Robert Crandall	American Airlines CEO; 1998–2003	Succeeded by Gerard Arpey
