= Oscar Munoz (executive) =

American businessman (born 1959)

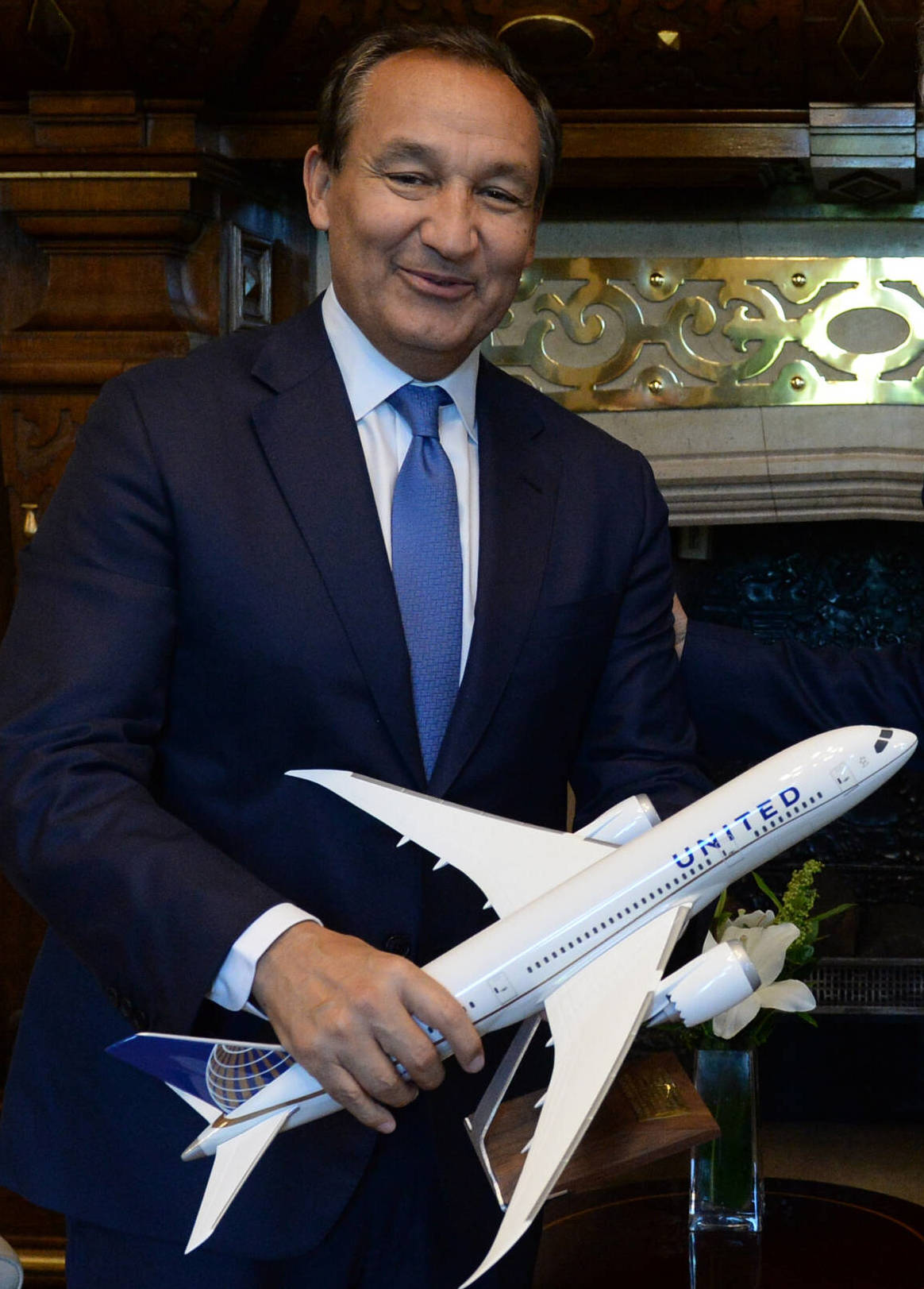
- Born: January 5, 1959 (age 67); California, U.S.
- Education: University of Southern California (BS); Pepperdine University (MBA)
- Occupations: Former CEO and Chairman of United Airlines; Board Member
- Notable work: Turnaround Time
- Term: Sept 2015–May 2021
- Predecessor: Jeff Smisek
- Successor: Scott Kirby
- Spouse: Cathy Munoz
- Children: 4
- Website: oscar-munoz.com

Oscar Munoz (born January 5, 1959) is an American businessman and board member, who was executive chairman of United Airlines from 2020 to 2021, after having been chief executive officer (CEO) of United Airlines from 2015 to 2020. He is of Mexican descent. Prior to his role at United Airlines, Munoz was on the board of parent company United Continental Holdings and held executive positions at CSX Corporation and AT&T.

Munoz serves on the boards of directors of Salesforce, TelevisaUnivision, and Archer Aviation. He is also a member of the boards of trustees of Fidelity Investments, the University of Southern California, and the Brookings Institution.

== Early life and education ==
Munoz was born on January 5, 1959, the eldest of nine children in a Mexican-American family from Southern California. He was the first in his family to graduate from college. Munoz earned a BS in business from the University of Southern California in 1982, and an MBA from Pepperdine University.

== Career ==
Munoz began his career holding various financial positions at PepsiCo, afterwards becoming a regional vice president of finance and administration for The Coca-Cola Company.

Munoz was chief financial officer for US West beginning in 1999. When the company merged with Qwest in 2000, he was vice president of finance for the combined company until 2001. From 2001 to 2003, he was the chief financial officer and vice president of consumer services at AT&T.

He joined the CSX Corporation in 2003 as chief financial officer and chief of strategy. In 2012, he was promoted to chief operating officer of CSX, a role which he held until 2015, when he was named president of the company. During his tenure as chief operating officer, Munoz was responsible for keeping trains running on time. CSX was included in Institutional Investor magazine’s list of Most Honored Companies. During the period under review, the company reported an increase in operating income of nearly 600%. In mid-2015, Munoz was appointed as the next CEO of CSX, officially slated to start in the position at the end of the year, before leaving the company in September 2015 to become CEO of United Airlines.

Munoz was named CEO of United Airlines on September 8, 2015, succeeding Jeff Smisek. Bloomberg Businessweek published an article examining United Airlines’ efforts to address operational and customer service problems. At the time of this appointment, Munoz had been a member of the board of directors of United's parent company, United Continental Holdings, since its formation in 2004.

After becoming CEO of United, Munoz embarked on a "listening tour" of the company, meeting with disgruntled employees around the United States and discussing their concerns. While this phase was intended to last for the first 90 days of the job, Munoz was hospitalized after having a heart attack in October 2015, 38 days into the job.

In his memoir and subsequent interviews, Munoz described an approach to corporate transformation that involved gathering feedback from frontline employees and considering its relationship to customer outcomes.

In 2015, five years after the merger of Continental and United, staff remained on separate labor contracts and were only allowed to fly on the routes and planes for the company where they were employed before the merger, causing contentions between management and labor. Under Munoz's tenure, five-year contracts for flight attendants were approved within four months, after years of negotiations. By the end of 2016, all union labor contracts were renegotiated. Although pilots were unable to reach a joint labor agreement in 2012, United agreed to a two-year contract extension with the pilots' union in 2016, under Munoz, allowing pilots to retain some of the pay and benefits that were cut after the September 11 attacks. On August 29, 2016, Munoz hired Scott Kirby, then-president of American Airlines, to fill the same role at United.

In 2015, Munoz was one of two Hispanic CEOs among the top 100 companies in the Fortune 500. He was named one of Hispanic Business magazine’s “100 Most Influential Hispanics” and was the first Latino to serve as CEO of a major U.S. airline. In March 2017, he received PRWeek’s Communicator of the Year award.

The following month, Munoz received widespread criticism for his handling of the issues after a ticketed passenger was forcibly removed from United Airlines Flight 3411. In an email to United employees, Munoz initially stated that he stood behind employees for having "followed established procedures" and described the passenger as "disruptive and belligerent." In a second press release on April 11, which was more sensitive to public opinion, Munoz apologized "for having to re-accommodate these customers". Munoz's handling of the incident was described by various critics as a "fumbling response," a "major disappointment," and a "sort of a self-immolation [that] makes you wonder about his choice as CEO." Munoz was already under pressure from activist shareholders to improve United's performance, including its customer relations, after he took charge of the airline in 2015. After the incident, Steve Barrett, editor-in-chief of PRWeek US, stated "if PRWeek was choosing its Communicator of the Year now, we would not be awarding it to Oscar Munoz … In time, the episode and subsequent response will be quoted in textbooks as an example of how not to respond in a crisis." Subsequently, on April 21, 2017, UCH announced that Munoz would remain chief executive officer of the airlines but would "not take broader control of the company as previously planned." Munoz had been scheduled to assume the role of chairman of the board of UCH at the company's 2018 annual stockholders' meeting.

In December 2019, it was announced that Munoz would be re-accommodated to the role of executive chairman of the board in May 2020. In March 2020, Munoz thanked the United States government for bailing out the US airline industry, and pledged a number of its planes to deliver critical medical supplies during the pandemic. In April 1, 2020, Munoz spoke with U.S. Senator Dick Durbin about the COVID-19 pandemic's impact on the airline industry, and how the CARES Act would help his plan to use federal relief funding to secure jobs and protect consumers during the crisis. President Scott Kirby took over the CEO role from Munoz in May 2020 at United's annual meeting. Munoz was positioned to serve a one-year term as chairman of United Airlines Holdings, succeeding retired Jane Garvey.

On May 27, 2021, it was announced that Edward "Ted" Philip would succeed Munoz as non-executive chairman of United Airlines Holdings, Inc.

In 2026, Munoz co-founded Mako Capital Group, a private equity firm located in Miami.

Munoz has also served on University of North Florida's board of trustees and the PAFA advisory board of Vanderbilt University. Munoz is a voting member of the University of Southern California Board of Trustees, where he serves as co-chair of the Finance and Campus Planning Committee.

=== Author ===
In 2023, Munoz wrote his first memoir, Turnaround Time, ISBN 978-0063284289 which discusses his upbringing as an immigrant in the US and how he became the first Latino CEO of a major U.S. airline. He also writes about his listening tour to talk directly to frontline employees to get their input, which informed his strategy for United Airlines, as well as his 2015 heart attack and heart transplant.

=== Articles ===
- Oscar Munoz (May 11, 2023) Transcript: "Race in America: Breaking Barriers with Oscar Munoz" (Washington Post)
- Oscar Munoz (April 22, 2024) "Regaining Trust and Inspiring Change in the Most Chaotic Times" (Medium)
- Oscar Munoz (April 13, 2017) "United CEO Oscar Munoz: The Rise And Fall Of A Communicator Of The Year" (NDTV)

=== Board positions ===
Munoz is on the boards of directors at Salesforce, Univision, CBRE, and Archer. He sits on the boards of trustees at Fidelity Investments, the University of Southern California, and The Brookings Institution He is a member of the Defense Business Board at the United States Department of Defense.

== Personal life ==
Munoz is married; he and his wife have four children. Munoz is also an avid cyclist and has run in marathons.

=== Philanthropy ===
Munoz has supported the American Heart Association and its Social Impact Fund.

In 2011, the couple gave $100,000 to the University of North Florida to fund a scholarship for students who are the first in their family to attend college. The same year, the couple donated $1 million to a middle school in Florida to fund a dropout prevention program.

In 2002, Munoz and his wife Cathy founded the Pave it Forward Foundation. From 2023 to 2026, the organization partnered with the American Heart Association to support $850,000 in health equity initiatives in Chicago.

=== Health ===
Munoz suffered a heart attack on October 15, 2015, a month after he assumed the position of CEO of United Airlines. As he awaited a heart transplant, Munoz interviewed candidates for top management jobs in his apartment while connected to machines that kept his heart functioning. On January 5, 2016, he received a heart transplant and returned to work in March 2016. Munoz is one of few CEOs to continue in the position after receiving a heart transplant. He has spoken publicly about his vegan diet and has since transitioned to what he refers to as a "flexitarian" diet after his heart transplant.

Business positions
Preceded by Michael Ward	President of CSX Corporation; 2015	Succeeded by Clarence Gooden
Preceded by Jeff Smisek	CEO of United Continental Holdings; 2015–2020	Succeeded by Scott Kirby
