= EnRoute (credit card) =

enRoute card

enRoute was a credit card issued by Air Canada until 1992, when the airline sold its credit card division to Diners Club.

The card was developed only for Air Canada transactions, but over time, the card was expanded into a more general credit card for business travellers, being accepted by hotels, restaurants, and other merchants. It offered such features as in depth transaction details and sorting of expenses by category.

In 1989, enRoute card became the first credit card to earn its cardholders Aeroplan miles with their purchases.

In 1992, Air Canada sold the CA$300 million enRoute card business to Diners Club. The move gave enRoute cardholders access to the existing Diners Club network of 2.1 million merchants at the time, while earning existing Diners Club Canada cardholders Aeroplan miles. For several years following the business transaction, Diners Club credit cards were marketed as in Canada "Diners Club/en route".

== Inflight magazine ==
Today, enRoute remains the name of Air Canada's monthly inflight magazine, with a circulation of 116,244, as of 2016.
