= Gerard Arpey =

American business executive (born 1958)

- Born: July 26, 1958 (age 68); New York City, New York
- Education: University of Texas at Austin
- Occupations: Former chairman, president and CEO of AMR Corporation
- Spouse: Divorced
- Children: 3

Gerard J. Arpey (born July 26, 1958) is the former chairman, president, and chief executive officer (CEO) of AMR Corporation, parent company to American Airlines.

== Early life and education ==
Arpey received a Bachelor of Business Administration degree in 1980 and an MBA in 1982, both from the University of Texas at Austin. He also holds an FAA Multi-Engine Instrument Pilot Rating and is an avid private pilot.

== Career ==
Arpey was elected chairman of AMR Corporation and American Airlines, Inc. in May 2004. Arpey had been president and chief executive officer of AMR and American, since April 2003, when he was first elected a member of the board of directors of both companies. Prior to that, he had served as president and chief operating officer of AMR and American since April 2002.

Arpey led a global organization that included American Airlines, American Eagle and AmericanConnection, serving approximately 250 cities in 40 countries and territories around the world. During Arpey's tenure the combined network offered, on average, more than 3,400 flights a day with nearly 900 aircraft.

Before his appointment as president and COO, Arpey served as American Airlines' executive vice president of operations, senior vice president of finance and planning, and chief financial officer and senior vice president of planning.

As executive vice president of operations, Arpey was responsible for American's worldwide flight operations, including Maintenance and Engineering, Flight Department, Operations Planning, Purchasing, Corporate Real Estate, AA Cargo and American Eagle.

As the company's chief finance and planning executive, Arpey directed the corporation's strategic planning activities, including its scheduling, fleet planning and airline partnership activities. As chief financial officer, he was responsible for the corporation's finance functions including the Financial Planning, Treasury, Accounting, Corporate Development, and Investor Relations groups.

Arpey joined American Airlines in 1982 as a financial analyst. He held numerous management positions during his career at American, including managing director of Airline Profitability Analysis, managing director of Financial Analysis and Fleet Planning, and managing director of Financial Planning. He became a corporate officer in 1989, when he was elected vice president of Financial Planning and Analysis.

Arpey announced his retirement on November 29, 2011, coinciding with the bankruptcy filing of American Airlines parent AMR. He was succeeded by Thomas W. Horton. Some airline industry analysts suggested that Arpey did long-term damage to AMR by not filing for Chapter 11 protection earlier on, something he refused to implement on moral grounds as the process of bankruptcy was intended for the purpose of decreasing pension and other financial obligations made to employees. Arpey declined requests by both the AMR board and Horton to stay on in some management capacity because of his unwillingness to work under a bankruptcy scenario. As per his contract, Arpey did not receive any severance upon retirement.

On December 1, 2011, Arpey joined Emerald Creek Group, LLC as a partner. Arpey is a member of the board of directors of S. C. Johnson & Son. He is also a member of The Business Council and involved in a variety of civic organizations.

=== September 11, 2001 ===
Arpey was executive vice president of operations at the time of the September 11 attacks during which American Airlines lost two planes. Arpey made the decision to ground all American Airlines flights in Northeastern United States and then across the entire nation before the Federal Aviation Administration directive to do so.

Business positions
Preceded by Donald J. Carty	American Airlines CEO; 2003–2011	Succeeded by Thomas W. Horton
