= Thomas W. Horton =

American businessman

- Born: May 24, 1961 (age 65); Hampton, Virginia, U.S.
- Education: Baylor University; Southern Methodist University
- Occupations: Lead director at Walmart Inc. and General Electric; Former chairman, president and CEO of American Airlines Group, Inc.
- Children: 2

Thomas W. Horton (born May 24, 1961) is a partner of Global Infrastructure Partners and is lead director at Walmart Inc. and General Electric Corp.

He was chairman, president, and CEO of AMR Corporation until it merged with US Airways Group to form American Airlines Group, Inc., then became chairman of American Airlines Group, Inc. and American Airlines.

Horton is credited with reinventing American Airlines and improving the company's overall performance, and leading the company through one of the most successful restructurings of that scale, culminating in a merger with US Airways.

== Early life and education ==
Horton was born in Hampton, Virginia and spent much of his life in Texas. He earned a BBA degree, magna cum laude, from Baylor University and an MBA degree from the Cox School of Business at Southern Methodist University in 1985.

== Career ==
Horton began his career at AMR in 1985 in finance. From 1998 to 2000, he led the airline's International business based in London. Horton was appointed chief financial officer in January 2000.

He joined AT&T in 2002 as chief financial officer and was later appointed vice-chairman. He is credited with helping to create the new AT&T, having led the evaluation of strategic alternatives in 2005, ultimately leading to the combination with SBC which formed the new AT&T.

Horton returned to AMR in March 2006 and served as executive vice president of finance and planning and chief financial officer of AMR and American. In 2008, he was named US top CFO by Institutional Investor magazine. On July 21, 2010, he was named president of the airline.

On November 28, 2011, Horton was named CEO and chairman of American Airlines. He led a team to restructure the company, while lowering costs, including in debt, leases, and its aircraft fleet, while negotiating labor contracts, among AMR's chief goals, to restore company profitability and competitiveness.

Simultaneously, Horton led a renewal of American's fleet and products with a landmark aircraft deal in which Boeing and Airbus would provide new airplanes to replace the older ones. The deal was the largest aircraft order in history, with 460 new single-aisle jets from the two manufacturers and $13 billion in financing. Horton's team led the airline through a rebranding including a new aircraft livery featuring a new logo and flag on the aircraft tail.

During restructuring Horton secured a deal for the anticipated buyout from US Airways in which AMR creditors and unions owned 72% of the new company, and US Airways shareholders owned 28%. US Airways had originally sought a controlling stake in the combined company. The combined company became American Airlines Group. Through the purchase and merger, Horton achieved full recovery for bondholders and, unusually, during a bankruptcy process, substantial recovery for equity holders. The new American Airlines Group became the world's largest airline. Horton completed his tenure as chairman in June 2014.

On April 15, 2019, Horton became a partner of worldwide infrastructure equity investment firm Global Infrastructure Partners.

== Board ==
Horton served on the board of Qualcomm Inc. from 2008 to 2019 and was its presiding director from 2015 to 2019. On November 21, 2014, he was appointed to the board of Walmart and was later named its lead director. In September 2015, he was appointed lead director of General Electric's board of directors. He joined Warburg Pincus as senior advisor that October. Horton is also a member of the executive board of the SMU Cox School of Business and is a member of the board of the National Air and Space Museum. Horton served as chairman of Oneworld, the global airline alliance, from December 2011 until March 2014.

== Personal life ==
Horton is married with two grown children. He is an avid runner and a jet-rated commercial pilot.

Business positions
Preceded by Gerard Arpey	President of American Airlines; 2010 – 2013	Succeeded by Scott Kirby
Preceded by Gerard Arpey	Chairman and CEO of American Airlines; 2011 – 2013	Succeeded by Doug Parker
