= Delta Board Council =

The Delta Board Council represents the non-contract employees of Delta Air Lines to the company's executive management and the board of directors.

The council was formed in 1996, and currently comprises one representative from each of Delta's major employee operating units: Airport Customer Service, Inflight Service, Management and Administrative employees, Reservation Sales, and Technical Operations. The DBC is tasked with holding employee meetings at every level below corporate director to gauge feedback and disseminate information.

It then meets with the company's officer corp and board of directors, usually in private session, to present the gathered feedback, thus allowing a clear line of communication "from the break room to the board room". In unprecedented fashion at a non-union carrier, on a rotating basis, one DBC member is allowed access to all board meetings and has historically presented information on topics of interest to the board.

Moreover, the DBC member in the board room attends the Audit Committee functions of the board. While the DBC works usually behind the scenes with Delta's leadership and the board, it played a critical and visible role in Delta's rejection of US Airways' hostile takeover attempt initiated by CEO Doug Parker on November 15, 2006. Within hours of the bid, the board council began working on a counterattack and its members were credited with coining the "Keep Delta My Delta!" slogan that quickly permeated the entire airline via buttons, wrist bands, lanyards, pens, and window clings. That tagline was also adopted by Delta in the creation of the Website keepdeltamydelta.org, which presented a wide array of arguments in opposition to Airways' proposal.

On November 17, 2006, two days after US Airways announced its intention to buy Delta Air Lines, the board council published an open letter to all Delta employees first unveiling the Keep Delta My Delta! theme. The eruption of support for Keep Delta My Delta! soon migrated to loyal customers, who added the aforementioned memo to such Websites as flyertalk.com and themselves began requesting Keep Delta My Delta! items. On December 13, 2006, the DBC and Delta pilot representatives organized a Keep Delta My Delta! rally at the Georgia International Convention Center.

Estimates suggest the crowd numbered between 3,000 and 4,500 employees, retirees, and community supporters. Among the speakers were Georgia state and local politicians, Delta pilots, and the Delta Board Council. It is considered by Delta employees to be the turning point in terms of labor relations, as Mr. Parker's offer to buy Delta resulted in a unified workforce in opposition to the takeover bid that according to Delta employees eliminated divisional friction and, most important, festered animosity among ground employees and Delta's pilots. Ultimately, despite initial skepticism from analysts, the campaign to Keep Delta My Delta! presented a labor obstacle that added to the already-uncertain regulatory and operational challenges that could not be overcome. On January 31, 2007, US Airways withdrew its offer to buy Delta Air Lines.
