= Scott McCartney =

American journalist, best known as The Wall Street Journal's travel editor

Scott McCartney is The Wall Street Journal's travel editor, as well as a regular columnist for the newspaper.

== Background ==
McCartney currently lives in Dallas, though he is a native of Boston. He attended Duke University and graduated in 1982 with an A.B. in Public Policy Studies. He is the chair of the alumni network for The Chronicle, Duke's independent daily newspaper.

== Career ==
He spent eleven years at the Associated Press, before joining The Wall Street Journal in 1993. He writes a regular column for the Journal, "The Middle Seat", and is also the Travel Editor.

== Awards and honors ==
McCartney won the Online News Association award for online commentary in 2003 for "The Middle Seat" and the George Polk Award for transportation reporting in 2000. He has also been honored by the Deadline Club and New York's chapter of the Society of Professional Journalists.

== Works ==
- Defying the Gods: Inside the New Frontiers of Organ Transplants
- ENIAC: The Triumphs and Tragedies of the World's First Computer
- Trinity's Children: Living Along America's Nuclear Highway.
- Wall Street Journal Guide to Power Travel
