= American Airlines Group =

American publicly traded airline holding company

American Airlines Group Inc.
- Type: Public
- Traded as: Nasdaq: AAL; DJTA component; S&P 400 component
- Industry: Aviation
- Predecessors: AMR Corporation; US Airways Group
- Founded: December 9, 2013; 12 years ago
- Headquarters: Fort Worth, Texas, United States
- Number of locations: 350 destinations
- Area served: Worldwide
- Key people: Robert Isom (CEO); Greg Smith (chairman)
- Services: Air transportation
- Revenue: ▲US$54.6 billion (2025)
- Net income: ▼US$111 million (2025)
- Number of employees: 133,300 (2024)
- Divisions: American Airlines Cargo; American Eagle
- Subsidiaries: American Airlines; Envoy Air; Piedmont Airlines; PSA Airlines; Republic Airways Holdings (20.8%); China Southern Airlines (1.5%)
- Website: aa.com
- Footnotes; Financials as of December 31, 2024.

American Airlines Group Inc. is an American publicly traded airline holding company headquartered in Fort Worth, Texas. It was formed on December 9, 2013, by the merger of AMR Corporation, the parent company of American Airlines, and US Airways Group, the parent company of US Airways. Integration was completed when the Federal Aviation Administration granted a single operating certificate for both carriers on April 8, 2015, and all flights now operate under the American Airlines brand.

The group operates the largest airline in the world, as measured by number of passengers carried and by scheduled passenger-kilometers flown. The company ranked No. 70 in the Fortune 500 list of the largest United States corporations based on its 2019 revenue.

== History ==
=== Merger proposals and plans ===
In January 2012, US Airways Group, the parent company of US Airways, expressed interest in taking over AMR Corporation, the parent company of American Airlines. In March, AMR's CEO Thomas W. Horton said that the company was open to a merger. US Airways told some American Airlines creditors that merging the two carriers could yield more than $1.5 billion a year in added revenue and cost savings. On April 20, American Airlines' three unions said they supported a proposed merger between the two airlines. With AMR under Chapter 11 bankruptcy protection, American Airlines had been looking to merge with another airline. Earlier in July, a bankruptcy court filing stated that US Airways was an American Airlines creditor and "prospective merger partner"; on August 31, US Airways CEO Doug Parker announced that American Airlines and US Airways had signed a nondisclosure agreement, in which they would discuss the possibility of a merger.

In February 2013, American Airlines and US Airways announced plans to merge, creating the largest airline in the world by some measurements. In the deal, which was expected to close in the third quarter of 2013, stakeholders of AMR would own 72% of the company and US Airways shareholders would own the remaining 28%. Rothschild & Co served as the investment bank for the transaction. The combination was considered a "merger of equals" between the two airlines, but retaining the more well-established "American" name going forward, and accordingly the holding company was renamed American Airlines Group Inc. The headquarters for the new group was also consolidated at American's headquarters in Fort Worth, Texas, but the US Airways' management team, including CEO Doug Parker, retained most operational management positions.

A judge approved the merger on March 27, 2013, but denied a proposed $20 million severance package to AMR chief Thomas W. Horton. On July 12, US Airways shareholders approved the proposed merger. Horton later received a smaller 17 million dollar severance.

=== Attempts to block the merger ===
On August 13, 2013, the United States Department of Justice, along with attorneys general from the District of Columbia, Arizona (headquarters of US Airways), Florida, Pennsylvania, Tennessee, Texas (headquarters of American Airlines), and Virginia filed a lawsuit seeking to block the merger, arguing that it would mean less competition and higher prices. American Airlines and US Airways both said that they would oppose the lawsuit and defend their merger. In early October 2013, the Attorney General of Texas rescinded the anti-trust lawsuit.

The Department of Justice reached a settlement on November 12, 2013, requiring the merged airline to relinquish landing slots or gates in 7 major airports. Under the deal, the new American was required to sell 104 slots at Ronald Reagan Washington National Airport and 34 slots at LaGuardia Airport. It was also required to sell gates at O'Hare International Airport, Los Angeles International Airport, Logan International Airport, Dallas Love Field and Miami International Airport. Some of the slots were expected to be sold to low-cost carriers such as JetBlue and Southwest Airlines.

A private antitrust suit, filed by a group of 40 passengers and travel agents, also sought to block the merger. American's bankruptcy court judge refused to enjoin the two airlines from merging, saying that the group did not demonstrate that the merger would irreparably harm them. The plaintiffs' lawyer appealed and was turned down at the U.S. District Court level and was further rebuffed at the Supreme Court after Justice Ruth Bader Ginsburg denied a stay request filed by him.

=== Implementation of merger ===
Following the Department of Justice approval, the merged Group company traded on the NASDAQ stock exchange under the symbol AAL. In December 2013 a severance package valued at about $17 million was agreed for Tom Horton, the outgoing AMR CEO, who had led American Airlines through bankruptcy and the major merger.

US Airways exited Star Alliance upon completion of the merger, and American retained its membership in Oneworld.

On July 13, 2015, American announced that it planned to discontinue the US Airways brand name by October 17, 2015, and on October 16, 2015, US Airways flew its final flight, US Airways Flight 1939, from Philadelphia to Charlotte to Phoenix to San Francisco to Philadelphia.

In March 2021, American Airlines Group said that it will repay the US government debt by issuing a private offering of notes worth about $5 billion, half due in 2026 and half in 2029, and a $2.5 billion term loan credit facility.

== Corporate affairs ==
=== Ownership and group structure ===
American Airlines Group, Inc. is publicly traded under the ticker symbol "AAL" on the Nasdaq Global Select Market, with a market capitalization of about $6.4 billion as of August 2024, and is included in the S&P MidCap 400 index. It was formerly a member of the S&P 500 index until September 23, 2024.

The group operates through its principal wholly owned mainline operating subsidiary, American Airlines.

It also has three subsidiaries, regional carriers Envoy Air Inc., Piedmont Airlines, Inc., and PSA Airlines Inc., that, together with two independent carriers, operate American Eagle under a codeshare and service agreement with American Airlines.

In 2017, the group announced a $200 million equity investment in China Southern Airlines. As of 2025, the group maintains its 1.5% ownership interest in China Southern Airlines.

=== Group business trends ===
The key trends for American Airlines Group since December 9, 2013, the earliest date that American and US Airways were under common control, are shown below (as at year ending December 31):

	Operating revenue (US$, in billions)	Net income (US$, in billions)	Number of employees (FTE, in thousands) (Note: at year end)	Number of passengers (in millions)	Passenger load factor (%)	Number of aircraft	Notes/ references
2014	42.6	2.8	113	197	82.0	1,549	
2015	40.9	7.6	118	201	83.0	1,533	
2016	40.1	2.6	122	198	81.7	1,536	
2017	42.6	1.2	126	199	81.9	1,545	
2018	44.5	1.4	128	203	82.0	1,551	
2019	45.7	1.6	133	215	84.6	1,547	
2020	17.3	−8.8	102	95.3	64.1	1,399	
2021	29.8	−1.9	123	165	75.3	1,432	
2022	52.7	0.33	129	199	82.9	1,461	
2023	52.7	1.1	132	211	83.5	1,521	
2024	54.2	1.2	133	226	84.9	1,562	
2025	54.6	0.56	139	223	83.6	1,580	
