= PSA Airlines =

American regional airline

PSA Airlines, Inc.

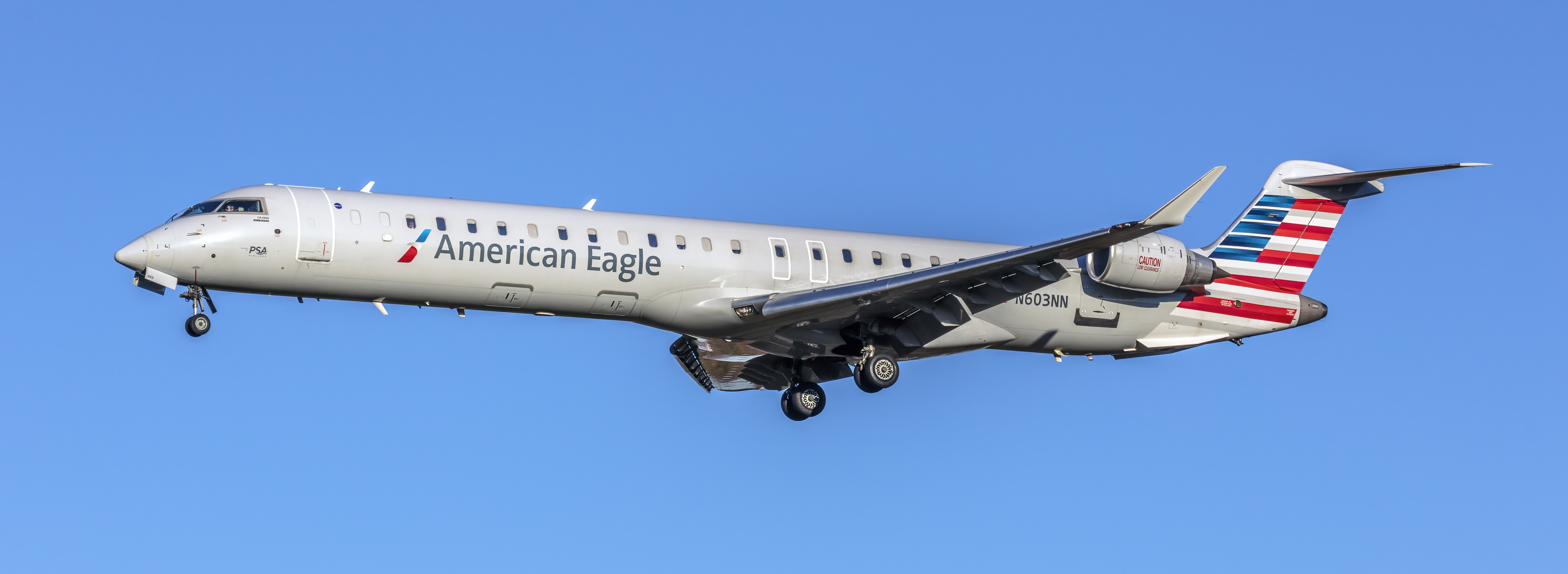
- CRJ900 in full American Eagle colors
| IATA | ICAO | Call sign |
|---|---|---|
| OH | JIA | BLUE STREAK |
- Founded: 1979; 47 years ago (as Vee Neal Airlines)
- AOC #: VNAA111A
- Hubs: Charlotte; Dallas/Fort Worth; Philadelphia; Washington–National
- Focus cities: Dayton
- Frequent-flyer program: AAdvantage
- Alliance: Oneworld (affiliate)
- Fleet size: 140
- Destinations: 71
- Parent company: American Airlines Group
- Headquarters: Charlotte-Douglas International Airport, Charlotte, North Carolina, U.S.
- Key people: Dion Flannery (President)
- Employees: 4,919 (2024)
- Website: www.psaairlines.com

PSA Airlines, Inc. is an American regional airline headquartered at Charlotte-Douglas International Airport in Charlotte, North Carolina. In January 2025, it was announced its headquarters would be moved from Dayton, Ohio to Charlotte. The airline is a wholly owned subsidiary of the American Airlines Group and it is paid by fellow group member American Airlines to staff, operate and maintain aircraft used on American Eagle flights that are scheduled, marketed, and sold by American Airlines.

PSA Airlines operates a fleet consisting of exclusively Bombardier regional jet aircraft. The company has a team of more than 5,000 employees, operating more than 800 daily flights to nearly 100 destinations.

The airline is named after Pacific Southwest Airlines (commonly known as PSA), one of the predecessors of today's American Airlines, to protect the trademark.

== History ==
=== Vee Neal Airlines ===
Named after its owner Vee Neal Frey, Vee Neal Airlines was established in Latrobe, Pennsylvania, and received an air operator's certificate in 1979. At first, the company operated as a fixed-base operator, and later added scheduled service between Latrobe and Pittsburgh with a Cessna 402 in May 1980.

Following the Airline Deregulation Act of 1978, nearby Erie, Pennsylvania, saw a decline in service, and Vee Neal saw an opportunity. The company made several unsuccessful attempts to start a new airline operation out of Erie International Airport using Embraer EMB 110 Bandeirante aircraft. A breakthrough would finally come in April 1983 when USAir announced it would further reduce frequencies out of Erie and would discontinue nonstop service to Chicago from Erie. Vee Neal Airlines was able to raise venture capital from a group of civic and business leaders, investors and corporations in the Erie area. The money was used to purchase six British Aerospace Jetstream 31 aircraft, which would operate out of Erie.

=== Jetstream International Airlines ===
In December 1983, the airline was renamed to Jetstream International Airlines (JIA) after it took delivery of its first two Jetstream aircraft. The next year, the company relocated its maintenance department and corporate headquarters from Latrobe to Erie.

Jetstream established a network of routes between Erie and Chicago, Cleveland, Detroit, Harrisburg, Newark, Philadelphia, Pittsburgh, and Washington, D.C. In addition, Jetstream provided service between Youngstown, Ohio, and both airports in Detroit.

The airline struggled financially, but on September 26, 1985, it secured a deal with Piedmont Airlines to operate flights under the Piedmont Commuter brand connecting Erie with Piedmont's Baltimore and Dayton hubs and Youngstown with Baltimore.

Still suffering financially, the next year Piedmont offered to buy Jetstream in a deal that closed on August 1, 1986. Piedmont immediately pivoted Jetstream's business model, making it a Piedmont Commuter feeder for their Dayton hub on September 15, 1986. In 1987, Jetstream once again moved its corporate headquarters, this time to its new base of operations in Dayton.

Parent company Piedmont Airlines was purchased by USAir in November 1987 and was fully merged into the airline on August 5, 1989. After the merger, Jetstream International Airlines started to operate under the USAir Express brand.

=== PSA Airlines ===
In the early 1990s, the airline began to replace its namesake Jetstream aircraft, first with leased Embraer EMB 120 aircraft, and later with the purchase of Dornier 328 aircraft. Reflecting that change, USAir announced in November 1995, that it would rename Jetstream International Airlines "PSA Airlines". The name change allowed USAir to protect the brand Pacific Southwest Airlines (commonly known as just PSA), which USAir had purchased at about the same time that it purchased Piedmont. USAir had already assigned the name Piedmont Airlines to Henson Airlines in 1993. By March 1996, the last Jetstream aircraft was replaced and PSA's stable of 25 Dornier 328 aircraft was the largest Dornier fleet in the world.

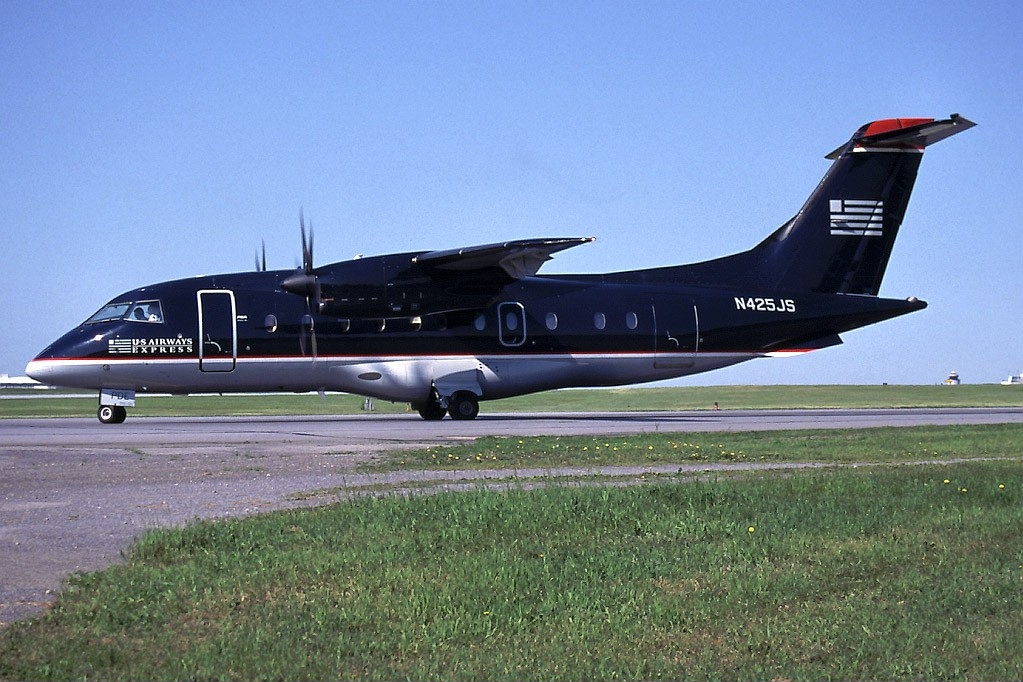
Dornier 328-110 operated for US Airways Express brand

In February 1997, USAir changed their name to US Airways, and PSA transitioned to operating under the name of US Airways Express.

On August 11, 2002, US Airways filed for Chapter 11 bankruptcy protection. During the reorganization, PSA was chosen to transition to a fleet of regional jet aircraft, including the Bombardier CRJ200 and CRJ700. The last Dornier 328 was retired from the PSA fleet in September 2004.

US Airways entered a second Chapter 11 bankruptcy on September 12, 2004, and was acquired by America West Airlines in 2005 in a reverse merger.

In February 2005, PSA opened its Charlotte crew base. The recently opened Philadelphia crew and maintenance bases also closed in September 2005. The Philadelphia crew base has since reopened, but maintenance is provided on-site by contract maintenance company STS Aviation Group.

In January 2008, US Airways flight activity at the Pittsburgh International Airport was significantly reduced due to market condition changes. US Airways mainline employees took over the US Airways Express flight operations at the airport and PSA ceased providing ground-handling services at the airport.

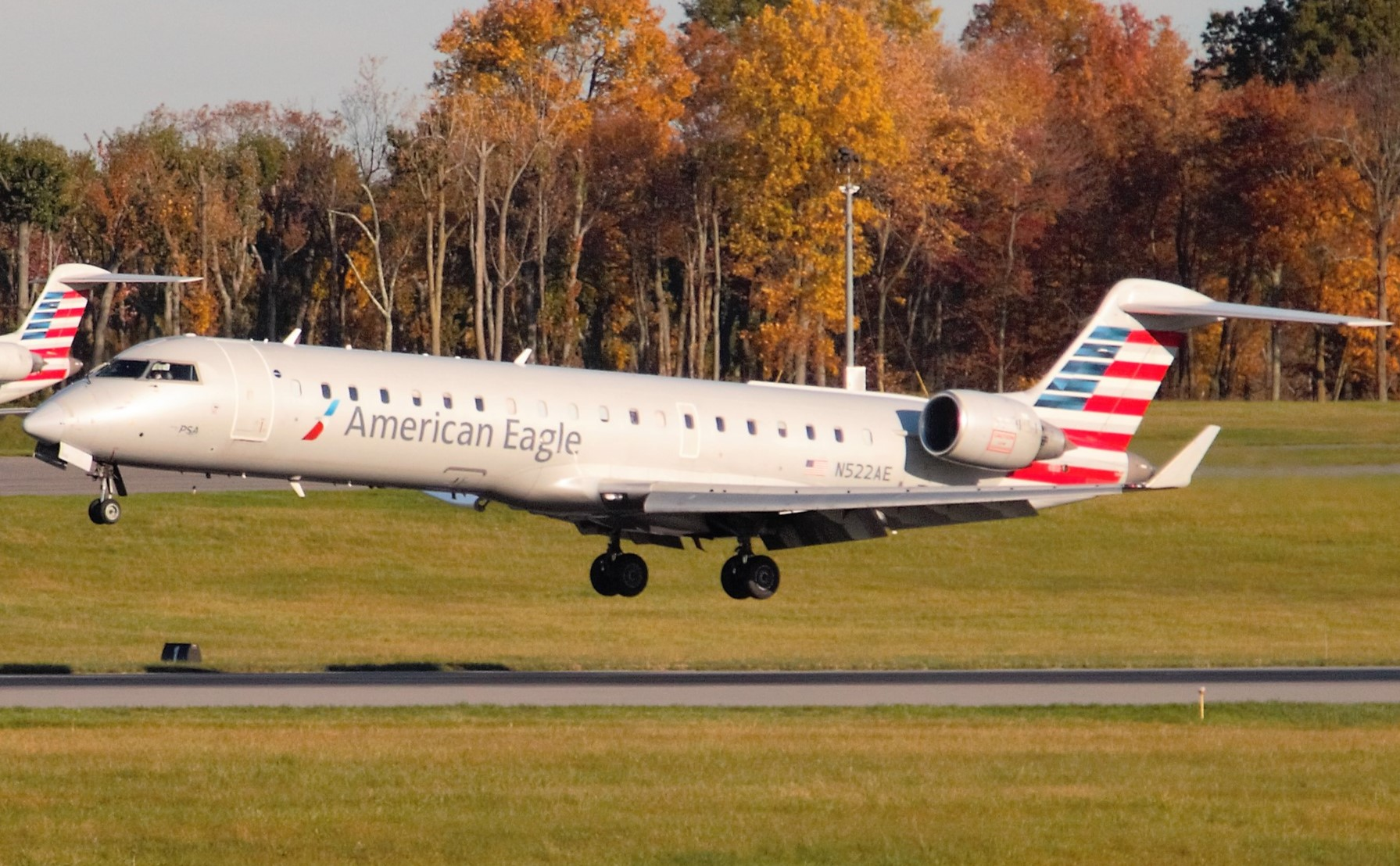
Bombardier CRJ-700

In 2015, after the merger of American Airlines and US Airways, PSA became part of American Airlines Group and started to operate American Eagle flights.

In August 2015, PSA Airlines announced a maintenance base would be established at Cincinnati/Northern Kentucky International Airport.

In August 2016, PSA Airlines announced a new 45,000-square-foot maintenance base would be opening in late 2016 at the Greenville-Spartanburg International Airport (GSP).

On January 29, 2025, hours before its first crash, PSA Airlines announced that it plans to move its corporate headquarters to Charlotte, North Carolina from Dayton, Ohio by January 2026; most of its daily departures are from, and almost all training is in, Charlotte. The new headquarters is to have 400 employees; all 350 Dayton headquarters staff have until the end of April 2025 to accept an invitation to move there. The airline will maintain a maintenance hangar and flight crew location in Dayton, with a total of 550 employees.

== Fleet ==
As of January 2026, the PSA Airlines fleet consists of these aircraft:

PSA Airlines fleet
| Aircraft | In service | Orders | Passengers | | | | Notes |
| Aircraft | In service | Orders | F | Y+ | Y | Total | Notes |
|---|---|---|---|---|---|---|---|
| Bombardier CRJ700 | 60 | — | 9 | 12 | 44 | 65 | |
| Bombardier CRJ900 | 91 | — | 12 | 24 | 40 | 76 | Aircraft orders from CityJet |
| Total | 151 | | | | | | |

In December 2013, American Airlines announced that it had ordered 30 Bombardier CRJ900 jets and was assigning them to PSA Airlines. The airline began taking deliveries of them in the second quarter of 2014 to finish initial delivery in 2015. In addition, American acquired options to purchase up to 40 additional CRJ-900 aircraft scheduled to be delivered in 2015 through 2016. Due to the COVID-19 pandemic, the CRJ200 fleet consisting of 35 aircraft was retired at an accelerated rate.

== Crew bases ==
As of January 2025, PSA Airlines uses these airports as crewmember domiciles:

- Charlotte Douglas International Airport
- Dayton International Airport
- Philadelphia International Airport
- Ronald Reagan Washington National Airport
- Dallas Fort Worth International Airport

== Maintenance bases ==
As of April 2024, PSA Airlines has maintenance bases at the following airports:

- Akron-Canton Airport
- Charlotte Douglas International Airport
- Cincinnati/Northern Kentucky International Airport
- Dayton International Airport
- Knoxville McGhee Tyson Airport
- Norfolk International Airport
- Greenville-Spartanburg International Airport
- Pensacola International Airport
- Savannah/Hilton Head International Airport
- Dallas Fort Worth International Airport

== Accidents and incidents ==
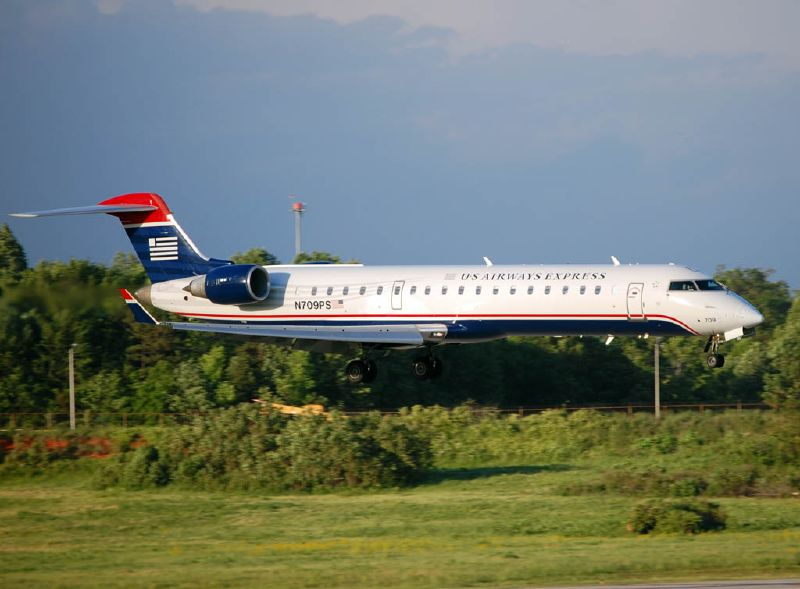
The Bombardier CRJ-700 operated for US Airways Express involved in the 2025 mid-air collision.

- January 29, 2025: American Eagle Flight 5342, from Wichita Dwight D. Eisenhower National Airport to Ronald Reagan Washington National Airport, a Bombardier CRJ701ER, operated by PSA Airlines, collided with a United States Army Sikorsky UH-60L Black Hawk helicopter on final approach to Reagan Airport. The Blackhawk flew into the path of the CRJ-700, causing both to crash into the Potomac River, killing all 60 passengers and 4 crew on board along with 3 crew on board the helicopter.

== See also ==
- Air transportation in the United States
- List of companies of the United States by state§Ohio
