= Robert Isom =

American airline executive

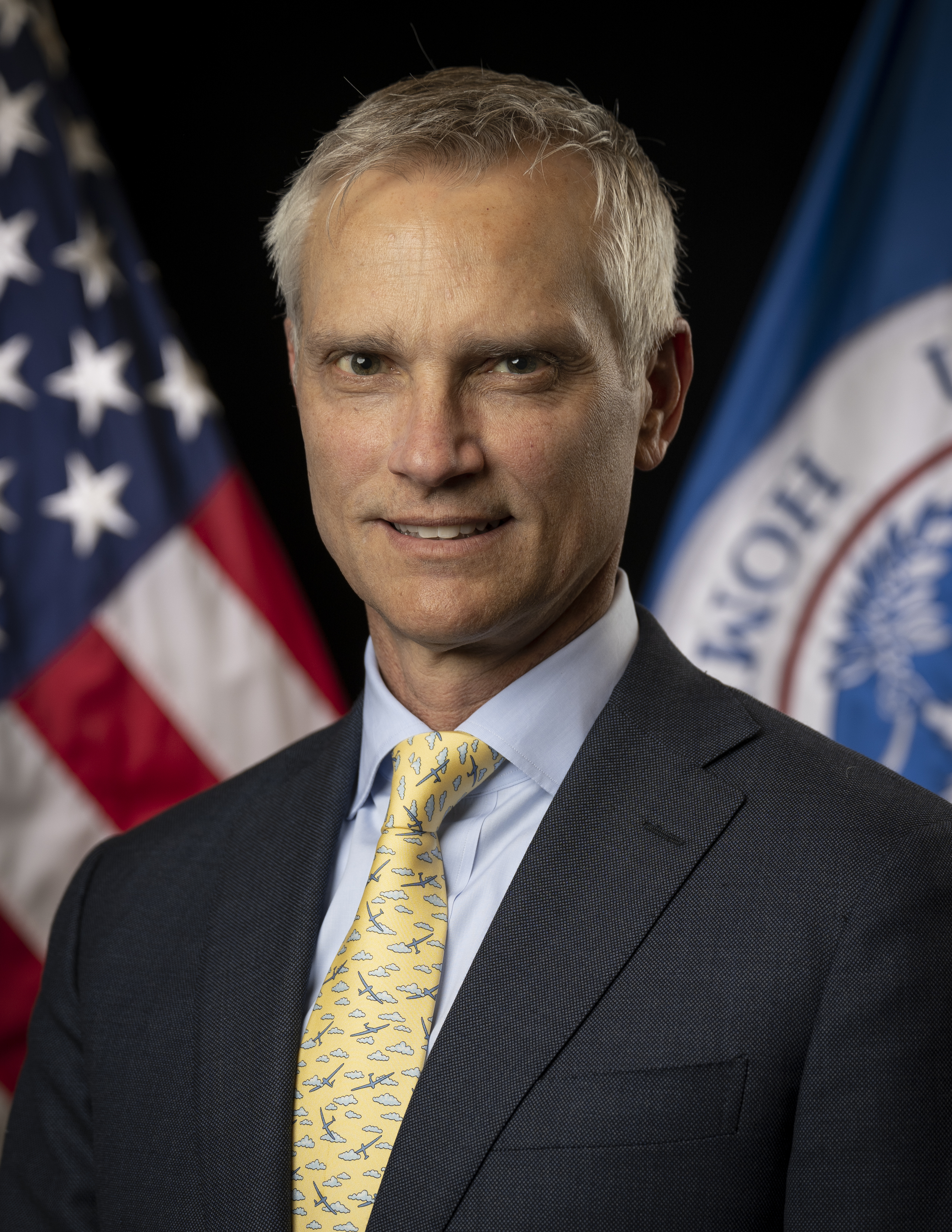
- Isom in 2022
- Born: 1967 (age 58–59)
- Education: University of Notre Dame (BS, BA); University of Michigan (MBA)
- Title: CEO of American Airlines Group and American Airlines
- Term: March, 2022–present
- Predecessor: Doug Parker

Robert Isom (born 1967) is an American businessman and CEO of the American Airlines Group and its subsidiary American Airlines. He was president of the airline from 2016 to 2022 and became the CEO of the airline in March 2022.

== Early life and education ==
Isom was raised outside of Detroit, Michigan. He attended the University of Notre Dame for his undergraduate studies where he obtained a Bachelor of Science in mechanical engineering and a Bachelor of Arts in English. He began working at Procter & Gamble before returning to Michigan to earn a Master of Business Administration from the University of Michigan.

== Career ==
After earning his MBA, Isom began his career in the airline industry at Northwest Airlines. He later worked at America West Airlines, before becoming the chief restructuring officer of GMAC, LLC. Isom then returned to America West, which had in 2005 merged with and was then named US Airways, to become Executive Vice President and COO.

Following the merger of US Airways and American Airlines in 2013, Isom retained his previous position in the newly combined airline. In 2016, Isom became president of American Airlines. On December 7, 2021, it was announced by the airline that Isom would be succeeding Doug Parker as CEO, and on March 31, 2022, following Parker's resignation, Isom became CEO and joined the board of directors.

Before officially becoming CEO, Isom was appointed to the Homeland Security Advisory Council on March 17, 2022, by U.S. Secretary of Homeland Security Alejandro Mayorkas.

On January 29, 2025, Isom released a video statement following the Potomac River mid-air collision involving American Eagle Flight 5342. He also announced that he would be traveling to Washington, D.C. with an American Airlines team and joined a press conference at Ronald Reagan Washington National Airport the following day.

As CEO of American Airlines, Isom received $15.6 million in compensation.

== Political activity ==
Isom has donated to both Democratic and Republican political campaigns, as well as to the American Airlines PAC. He has also supported Donald Trump's One Big Beautiful Bill Act.

Business positions
Preceded by Doug Parker	Chief Executive Officer of American Airlines; 2022–present	Incumbent
