= Aimia Inc. =

Canadian company

- Type: Public
- Traded as: TSX: AIM
- Industry: Investment Management
- Predecessor: Groupe Aeroplan Inc.
- Founded: 2011; 15 years ago
- Headquarters: Montreal, Quebec, Canada
- Area served: Worldwide
- Key people: Charles Frischer (chairman); Philip Mittleman (group chief executive)
- Products: Investment holding company
- Revenue: ▼CA$ 134 million (2019)
- Net income: ▲CA$ 1.1 billion (2019)
- Website: aimia.com

Aimia Inc. is a global investment holding company based in Montreal, Quebec, Canada. It is publicly listed on the Toronto Stock Exchange. Initially a loyalty solutions provider originating from Air Canada's Aeroplan program, in 2020 the company restructured to become an investment holding company.

== History ==
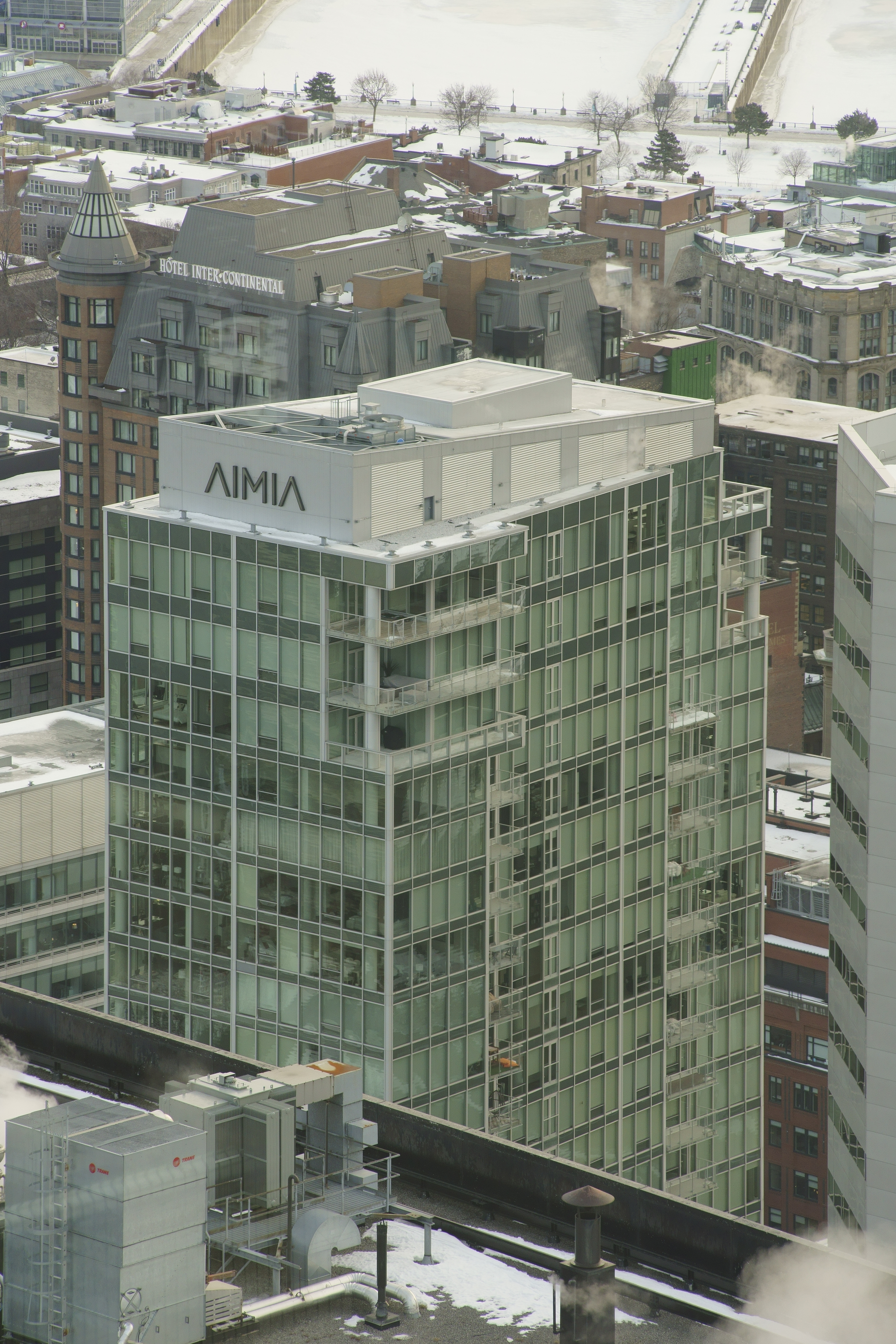
Aimia's former headquarters in Montreal, in 2019

Aimia originated from Air Canada's loyalty program Aeroplan, which was founded in 1984. The airline began divesting the loyalty program in 2005, creating Aeroplan Investment Fund, which was later renamed Groupe Aeroplan. Aeroplan was fully divested from Air Canada in 2008. From October 2011 it conducted business under the Aimia brand name, and on May 4, 2012, formally changed its name to Aimia Inc.

The company acquired Loyalty Management Group, a loyalty management and analysis business which owned and operated Nectar, a notable UK loyalty program, in 2007. Over time the company acquired other loyalty and marketing companies, such as Carlson Marketing in 2009.

In 2018, Aimia agreed to sell Aeroplan to Air Canada, TD Bank, CIBC, and Visa for $450 million in cash, which was completed in 2019, returning Aeroplan to its original parent Air Canada.

In 2020, Aimia announced a corporate transformation from a loyalty solutions business to an investment holding company.
