= Doug Parker =

American businessman

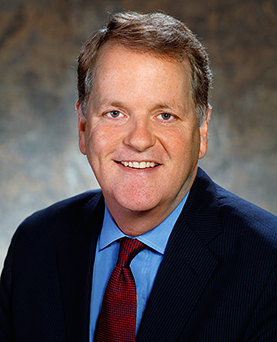
- Born: William Douglas Parker; October 31, 1961 (age 64)
- Education: Albion College (BA); Vanderbilt University (MBA)
- Board member of: Qantas Member of the Board 2023–; American Airlines Group Chairman and CEO 2013–2022
- Spouse: Gwen Parker
- Children: 3

William Douglas Parker (born October 31, 1961) is an American businessman. He spent more than 20 years as an airline executive, including as the CEO and chairman of American Airlines Group, as well as executive positions with America West Airlines and US Airways. He is a current board member of Qantas, and also the founder of the nonprofit organization Breaking Down Barriers.

== Early life and education ==
Parker grew up in Michigan and received a BA in Economics from Albion College (1984). He then received an MBA from the Owen Graduate School of Management at Vanderbilt University (1986), where American Airlines offered him a job after a campus interview.

== Career ==
=== 1986-1994; Early career ===
Parker was a financial analyst at American Airlines from 1986 to 1991, and a member of then CEO Robert Crandall's "Brat Pack", alongside Thomas W. Horton (former CEO President and Chairman of American), C. David Cush (former CEO of Virgin America), and Ben Baldanza (former CEO of Spirit Airlines).

His work at American led him to being recruited by Northwest Airlines in 1991. He joined the airline to help create a team that systematically figured out where the airline was making and losing money, tracking profits flight-by-flight in such detail at that level was a first for Northwest.

=== 1995-2012; America West and US Airways ===
Parker became chief financial officer and senior vice president of America West Airlines in 1995. While CFO, he worked as then-CEO Bill Franke's protege, training to be the next CEO. Parker was named Chairman and CEO of the airline on September 1, 2001, 10 days before the September 11 attacks. Under Parker, America West was the first of several airlines to win post-9/11 federal loan guarantees, saving the airline from a second bankruptcy.

In 2005, Parker negotiated the merger between America West and US Airways, where he continued as the CEO of the combined company. US Airways made a bid to merge with Delta Air Lines as it was in bankruptcy protection in 2006, but creditors rejected the bid in early 2007. US Airways also attempted a merger with United Airlines in 2008 and in 2010, but United ultimately merged with Continental Airlines. In addition to the US Airways merger, Parker led the successful merger with American Airlines and was known as the architect of the airline merger trend.

=== 2013-2022; American Airlines ===
In 2012, US Airways launched an effort to merge with American Airlines, while American's parent company, AMR Corporation, was in bankruptcy protection. US Airways took the step of securing tentative contracts with American's labor groups, while AMR was still pushing to exit bankruptcy. That deal closed on 9 December 2013, and Parker was named CEO of the combined company, becoming the world's largest airline. In December 2021, American Airlines Group announced Parker would be retiring as the chief executive officer the following year, continuing as chairman of American’s board.

=== 2023 to present; post-American Airlines ===
Parker stepped down as chairman of American's board in April 2023. The following month he joined the board of directors at Qantas.

In 2023, Parker and his wife Gwen launched Breaking Down Barriers, a non-profit organization that helps people in underserved communities become pilots.

== Personal life ==
Parker lives in Dallas, Texas. He is married to Gwen Parker and has three children. In 2007, Parker pleaded guilty to his third driving under the influence charge and was sentenced to one day in jail. Shareholders questioned US Airways' failure to disclose Parker's two previous DUI arrests. Parker endorsed Democratic candidate Hillary Clinton in the run-up for the 2016 United States presidential election. Additionally, in 2019, Parker donated $2,500 to Democrat Steny Hoyer.

Parker has given commencement addresses as his alma mater's Albion College in 2010 and at Vanderbilt University's Owen Graduate School of Management in 2013. He also gave the commencement address to the 2019 class at Southern Methodist University.

Business positions
Preceded by Thomas W. Horton	CEO of American Airlines Group; 2013–2022	Succeeded by Robert Isom
