= Camden Central Airport =

Defunct airfield in New Jersey, United States (1929–1957)

- IATA: none; ICAO: none

Summary
- Owner/Operator: Central Airport Inc
- Serves: Philadelphia, Pennsylvania, U.S.
- Location: 5 mi (8.0 km) east of Philadelphia in Pennsauken Township, NJ
- Elevation AMSL: 7 ft / 2 m
- Coordinates: 39°55′48″N 75°04′44″W

Map
- Interactive map of Camden Central Airport

Runways
Direction	Length		Surface
Direction	ft	m	Surface
04/22	2,500	762	Asphalt
10/28	2,500	762	Asphalt
15/33	2,500	762	Asphalt

Camden Central Airport (sometimes called Central Airport, Camden) was an airport in Pennsauken Township, Camden County, New Jersey, United States. It had its peak of activity in the 1930s, serving as the main airport for the neighboring city of Philadelphia, Pennsylvania.

== Development ==
Philadelphia's earliest airport was on Hog Island in the Delaware River south of the city, but it was very small and distant from the city center. It was owned by the city and called Philadelphia Airport. Airline operations were also conducted at the Philadelphia Naval Shipyard's Mustin Field, where Philadelphia Rapid Transit Service (P.R.T. Line) operated a three-times daily passenger service to Hoover Field, Washington, D.C. from 6 July to 30 October 1926 using Fokker F.VII Trimotors. It also carried mail to Washington and Norfolk, Virginia.

In the mid-1920s a group of local businessmen started looking for a better site on which to establish a larger, modern airport more befitting the US's third largest city. The Delaware River Bridge, later named the Benjamin Franklin Bridge, across the Delaware between Philadelphia and Camden County, New Jersey, opened 1 July 1926, and a new highway to it opened up easy access to a large part of New Jersey. An area of flat land, part of which was already being used as a small airfield called Crescent Airport, (Note: Crescent Airport came to public attention when Emory Malick, giving a pleasure flight in a Waco three-seat biplane on 4 March 1928, suffered engine failure and skillfully avoided a crowd of spectators before crash landing on the field, saving the spectators and his passengers.) between the highway and the north bank of the Cooper River, at Pennsauken Township, was considered ideal for the new airport.

A new company, Central Airport Inc, was formed to buy the land, develop the facilities, and operate the airport. The company was based at 538 Fidelity-Philadelphia Building, Philadelphia, Pa. Prominent members of the Aero Club of Pennsylvania were instrumental in setting up the company; they included W. Wallace Kellett, Harold F. Pitcairn, and Charles Townsend Ludington who was the president of the company. The airport started with two 127 ft (39 m) x 100 ft (30 m) steel & concrete hangars and two unpaved runways (measuring 2,400 ft (730 m) northeast/southwest and 2,200 ft (670 m) east/west) as well as two 1,000 ft (300 m) hard surface "take-off only" strips. It was equipped with the most modern facilities including radio, a beacon on a 50 ft (15 m) tower, boundary lighting and a one million candlepower floodlight to illuminate the airfield.

Presciently, local press was already saying that the airport was too small, and that a local road should be moved to allow it to be expanded.

The airport started operations on 15 August 1929 with an official opening celebration on 21 September 1929. Eddie Rickenbacker attended in a Fokker tri-motor; he was Fokker Aircraft Company's vice president of sales at the time. and a Fokker F.32 made an appearance. There were air races and displays, and the press reported that around 50,000 people attended. The terminal building was completed shortly after the airport opened. This was in time for the arrival of the 1929 Ford National Reliability Air Tour, whose 29 competing aircraft, accompanied by 17 more carrying officials, support crew and press, arrived from Roosevelt Field, New York on 8 October, leaving for Logan Field, Baltimore the following day. This greatly helped to publicize the new airport.

== Operations ==
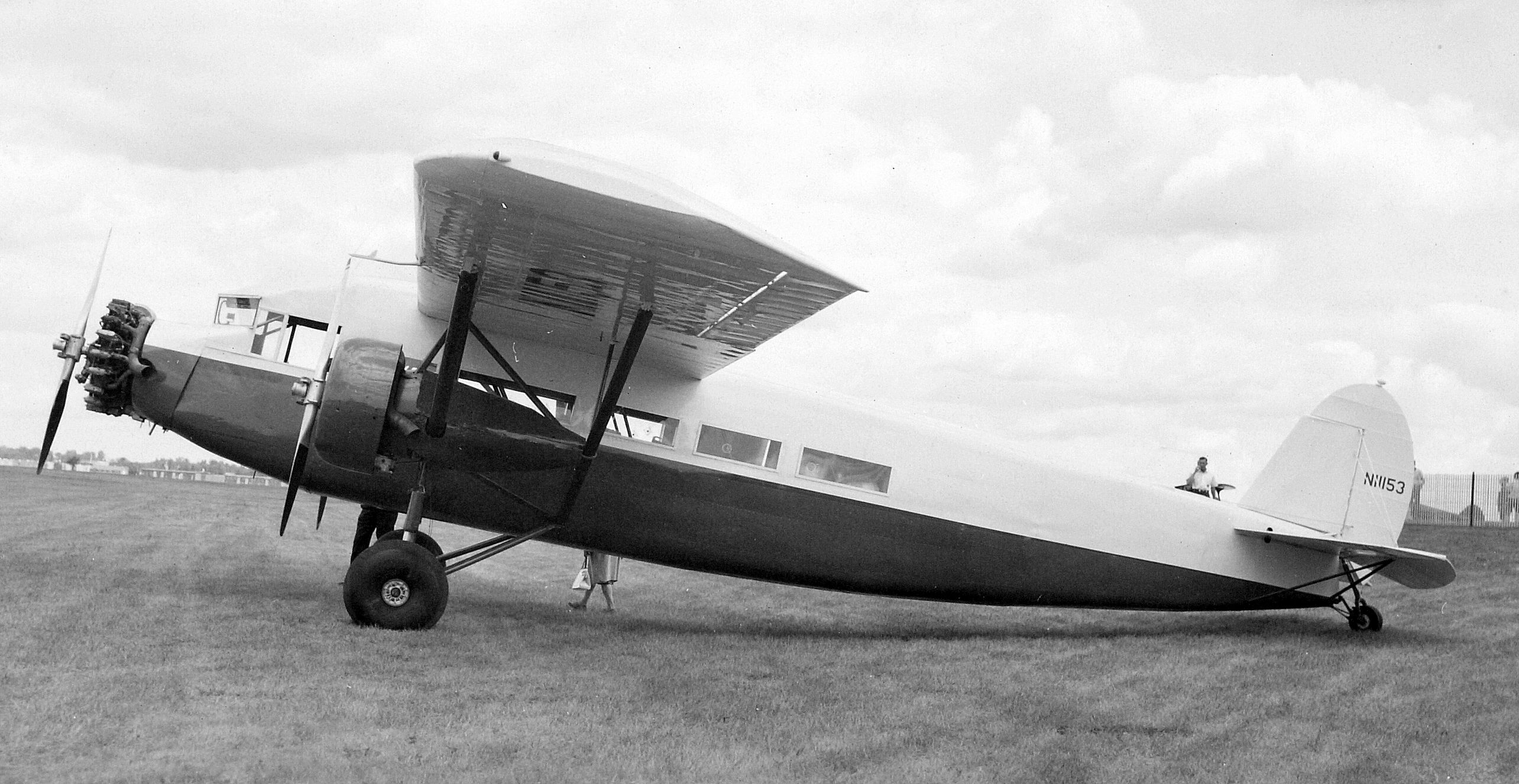
Stinson SM-6000-B tri-motor N11153. This aircraft was active in 2020.

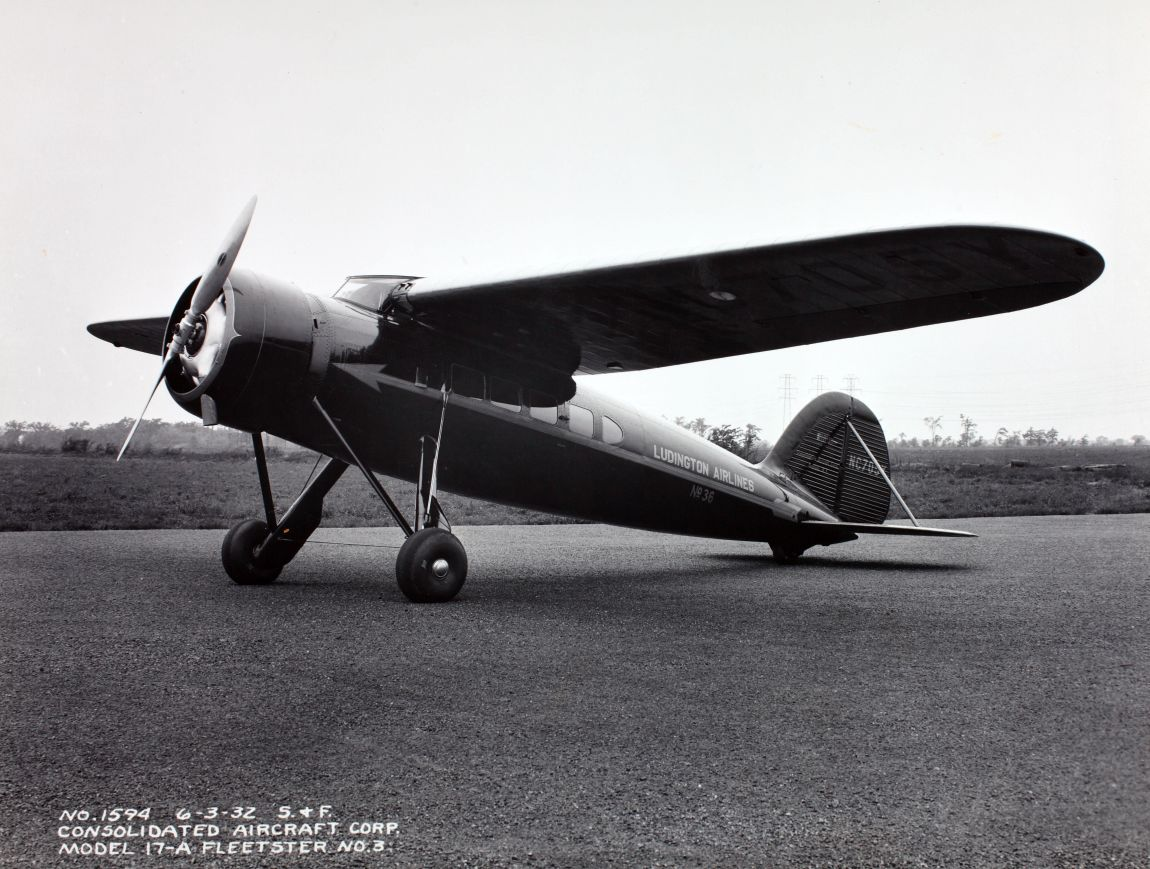
Consolidated Model 17AF Fleetster NC705Y of Ludington Airlines, June 1932.

Early operators were Curtiss-Wright Flying Service offering charter flights, Ludington-Philadelphia Flying Service, Jacobs Aircraft Engine Company, and Wings Corporation. The Ludington airline offered air taxi, pleasure flights, aircraft hire and instruction. It also operated Cape Cod Airway, which ran services to various destinations in New England. These were short-lived, and became part of the Ludington Line. Ludington Flying Service started operations with a service to Atlantic City. It was so popular that a new service started, offering hourly services linking Camden Central with Newark and Washington using Lockheed Vegas, Stinson tri-motors and Consolidated Fleetsters. After great initial success, it was unable to gain a mail contract, and was taken over by Eastern Air Transport in 1933. Wings Corporation flew a route to Stroudsburg, Pennsylvania. Wings was an operation based at Wings Field, Blue Bell, Pennsylvania, where the Aircraft Owners and Pilots Association (AOPA) has its roots - its first chairman was C. Townsend Ludington.

By 1933 there were three 2,500 ft (760 m) runways, described as "asphaltic oil treated gravel & macadam", arranged in a standard triangular pattern. Additional operators now included Eastern Air Transport, starting with a route between Washington and Miami; Kellett Autogiro Corporation; Camden Flying Service, a fixed-base operator also doing flight training, aerial advertising, air taxi work and sightseeing flights; and Transcontinental & Western Air (T&WA) with a service to Chicago. Pittsburgh Airways operated a route between Pittsburgh and New York calling at Central Airport en route, using their two Travel Air 6000s. Altogether up to 150 services were being operated daily.

RCA had many facilities in Camden, so it was natural for them to set up RCA Manufacturing Company Aviation Radio headquarters in its own hangar, recently vacated by Jacobs Engines at the north side of the airfield, including a demonstration center for its latest aviation radio equipment. They also had a service department.

The site was very popular with other businesses setting up adjacent to it, including bars and restaurants, the Central Airport Swimming Pool, the world's first drive-in movie theatre, and a dog-racing track (later a general sports stadium).

Eddie Rickenbacker hands a mailbag to KD-1B pilot Johnny Miller.

In 1938 W. Wallace Kellett and his well-known test pilot Johnny Miller suggested to Eddie Rickenbacker of Eastern Air Lines that he establish an autogyro mail-carrying service between the rooftop of the Philadelphia 30th Street Post Office and Camden Central Airport. The Post Office building, completed in 1935, had been designed with rotorcraft landings in mind. It had a flat asphalt roof with underfloor heating, take-off ramps at the sides, radio and weather reporting equipment, and fuelling and maintenance facilities. It was only marred by “penthouse structures” at each end which could cause problematic turbulence. After test flights, some performed by test pilot Lou Leavitt in the prototype Kellett KD-1, operations officially started on 6 July 1939 with a KD-1B, modified with a mail compartment in front of the enclosed single cockpit. There were five return flights per day, six days a week. The service was terminated by the Post Office a year later when the contract, referred to as AM2001, expired. There had been 2,634 flights, most of them flown by Miller, and 85% of all scheduled flights had been completed, well exceeding expectations. There had been just one incident when the autogiro, piloted by assistant pilot John Lukens, rolled over on the Post Office roof in a strong gust of wind, but Miller soon repaired the damage to the autogiro himself and flew it off. It had been the world's first scheduled rotorcraft mail service. There is color film of the autogiro operation.

By 1940 four major airlines were operating services: American Airlines, Eastern Air Lines, TWA, and United Air Lines. However, the runways were too short for modern airliners and there was no room for expansion, so they all moved to the new Philadelphia Municipal Airport as soon as its new terminal opened the same year.

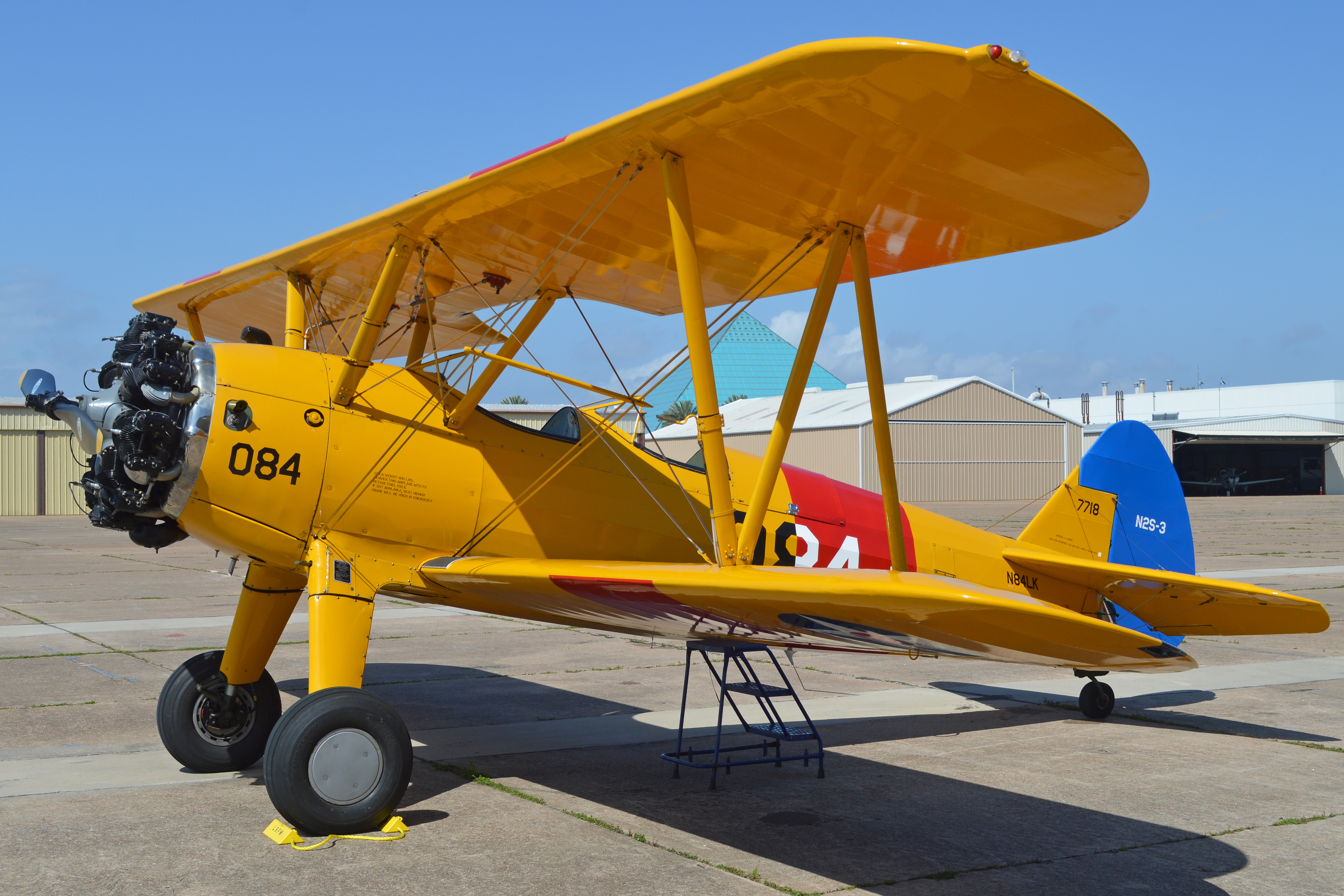
US Navy Boeing-Stearman N2S-3 trainer N84LK

During World War II the airport was taken over by the United States Navy and operated as a Naval outlying landing field (OLF) for Mustin Field. Training took place using Stearman N2S-3 aircraft.

== Demise ==
After the war, civil operations resumed, but, with the major airlines gone, at a much reduced level. A notable occupant for a while was Helicopter Air Transport, which set up here in 1946, using Sikorsky S-51 and Bell 47B helicopters in an attempt to establish itself as the world's first commercial helicopter operator. Excessive costs caused the company to wind up in late 1947.

The airport continued to run down, and was officially closed in April 1957, with a shopping center to be constructed on the site.

Nothing remains of the airfield except for the neighboring highway's "circle" (roundabout) – the first one in the United States, commonly known as Airport Circle ever since the airport opened. The circle is at the north-west corner of the airport site. There are also two roads, named Central Highway and Airport Highway in reference to the old airport, running through what is now an industrial park.

== Accidents and incidents ==
- On 5 November 1931 a Lockheed 9 Orion registered NC12221 of New York, Philadelphia & Washington Airways (a predecessor of the Ludington Line) crashed and burned on approach to Camden, killing all five occupants. The aircraft was on a scheduled direct flight from Newark to Washington, but was making an unscheduled stop at Camden to enable a local passenger to get off. The aircraft, piloted by Floyd Cox, crashed onto a golf course to the east of the airport.

== Bibliography ==
- Davies, R. E. G. (1998). Airlines of the United States since 1914 (2nd ed.). McLean, Virginia, USA: Paladwr Press. ISBN 1-888962-08-9.
