= James Banning =

American aviator

- Born: James Herman Banning; November 5, 1900; Canton, Oklahoma, U.S.
- Died: February 5, 1933 (aged 32); San Diego, California, U.S.
- Resting place: Evergreen Cemetery (Los Angeles)
- Education: Iowa State University
- Occupation: Demonstration pilot
- Known for: Coast-to-coast flight across the United States
- Spouse: Ada Carpenter (married 1927)

James Herman Banning (November 5, 1900 – February 5, 1933) was an American aviation pioneer. In 1932, accompanied by Thomas C. Allen, he became America's first black aviator to fly coast-to-coast across the contiguous United States.

== Background and personal life ==
Banning was born in Canton, Oklahoma, in 1900 and attended high school in Guthrie, Oklahoma. Dreaming from boyhood of being a pilot, he eventually learned to fly from an Army aviator after being repeatedly turned away from flight schools due to racial discrimination. He earned his commercial pilot's license in 1927 and later became a demonstration pilot and barnstormer on the west coast, flying a biplane named "Miss Ames"—he had attended Iowa State University in Ames, Iowa. He also competed in the 1928 Iowa Good Will air tour.

Banning married Ada Carpenter on April 2, 1923.

== Transcontinental flight ==
In 1932, Banning and his mechanic, Thomas C. Allen, made the historic flight using a plane they named "Eagle Rock" supplemented with surplus parts. The "Flying Hoboes", as they were affectionately known, made the 3,300-mile (5,300 km) trip from Los Angeles to Long Island, New York, in 41 hours and 27 minutes aloft. (Note: Covering 3,300 miles in 41.5 hours of flying time equates to an average speed of 79.5 miles per hour (127.9 km/h).) However, the trip actually required 21 days to complete because the pilots had to raise money for the next leg of the trip each time they stopped. They left California on September 21, 1932, and landed in New York on October 15.

== Death ==
Only four months after his historic flight, Banning was killed in a plane crash during an air show at Camp Kearny military base in San Diego on February 5, 1933. He was a passenger in a two-seater Travel Air biplane flown by Navy machinist's mate second class Albert Burghardt, who was at the controls because Banning had been refused use of the airplane by an instructor at the Airtech Flying School. After taking off and climbing 400 feet (120 m), the plane stalled and entered an unrecoverable tailspin in front of hundreds of horrified spectators. Banning was recovered from the wreckage and died one hour later at a local hospital.

== Legacy ==
A large photograph of Banning is displayed at the Disney California Adventure section of Disneyland in Anaheim, California, at the ride Soarin' Around the World, a flight motion simulator attraction. Provided underneath his photo is a plaque with a brief summary of his achievements and accomplishments as a tribute to the Wings of Fame, a hallway where guests wait during the line queue to the actual ride where many photographs and models of early plane concepts are displayed, including homages to significant individuals in aviation history, including Banning on the right side.

In November 2022, the city of Ames, Iowa, announced it would formally rename the Ames Municipal Airport as the James Herman Banning Ames Municipal Airport. The airport was officially renamed in a ceremony on June 17, 2023.

== See also ==
- Emory Conrad Malick, American aviation pioneer, asserted by some sources to have been the first licensed black aviator
