= Ames Municipal Airport =

James Herman Banning Ames Municipal Airport
- IATA: AMW; ICAO: KAMW; FAA LID: AMW

Summary
- Airport type: Public
- Owner: City of Ames
- Serves: Ames, Iowa
- Location: 2 miles SE
- Elevation AMSL: 956 ft (291 m)
- Coordinates: 41°59′31″N 93°37′18″W
- Website: www.cityofames.org

Map
- Location within Iowa Location within the United States

Runways
Direction	Length		Surface
Direction	ft	m	Surface
1/19	5,701	1,738	Asphalt
13/31	3,491	1,064	Concrete

Statistics (2022)
- Aircraft operations (year ending 9/12/2022): 30,150
- Based aircraft (2022): 63
- Source: Federal Aviation Administration

James Herman Banning Ames Municipal Airport (IATA: AMW, ICAO: KAMW, FAA LID: AMW) is two miles (3.2 km) southeast of Ames, in Story County, Iowa.

Originally consisting of two turf runways, the airport was created after a 1943 vote by the city of Ames. A new terminal and hangar were constructed in 2017, as part of a modernization effort.

Formerly named Ames Municipal Airport, and still commonly known as such, in 2023 the airport was officially renamed the James Herman Banning Ames Municipal Airport. James Herman Banning was the first African American to obtain a pilots license and was an alumnus of Iowa State University.

== Facilities ==
The airport covers 700 acres (280 ha) and has two runways: 1/19 is 5,701 by 100 ft (1,738 by 30 m) asphalt and 13/31 is 3,491 by 75 ft (1,064 by 23 m) concrete.

In the year ending September 12, 2022 the airport had 30,150 aircraft operations, average 83 per day: 93% general aviation, 5% air taxi and 1% military. At that time, 63 aircraft were based at the airport: 47 single-engine, 6 multi-engine, 4 jet, 5 glider, and 1 helicopter.

National Transportation Safety Board records show that no fatal accidents have occurred at the airport since 1962, the earliest year which can be searched in their database.

Iowa State University utilizes the airport for charter flights for many of its athletic teams, although its football team must use Des Moines International Airport since Ames does not have runways long enough to accommodate the Boeing 757s and Boeing 767s most frequently used by college football programs for travel.

== See also ==
- List of airports in Iowa
