= Emory Conrad Malick =

American pilot (1881–1959)

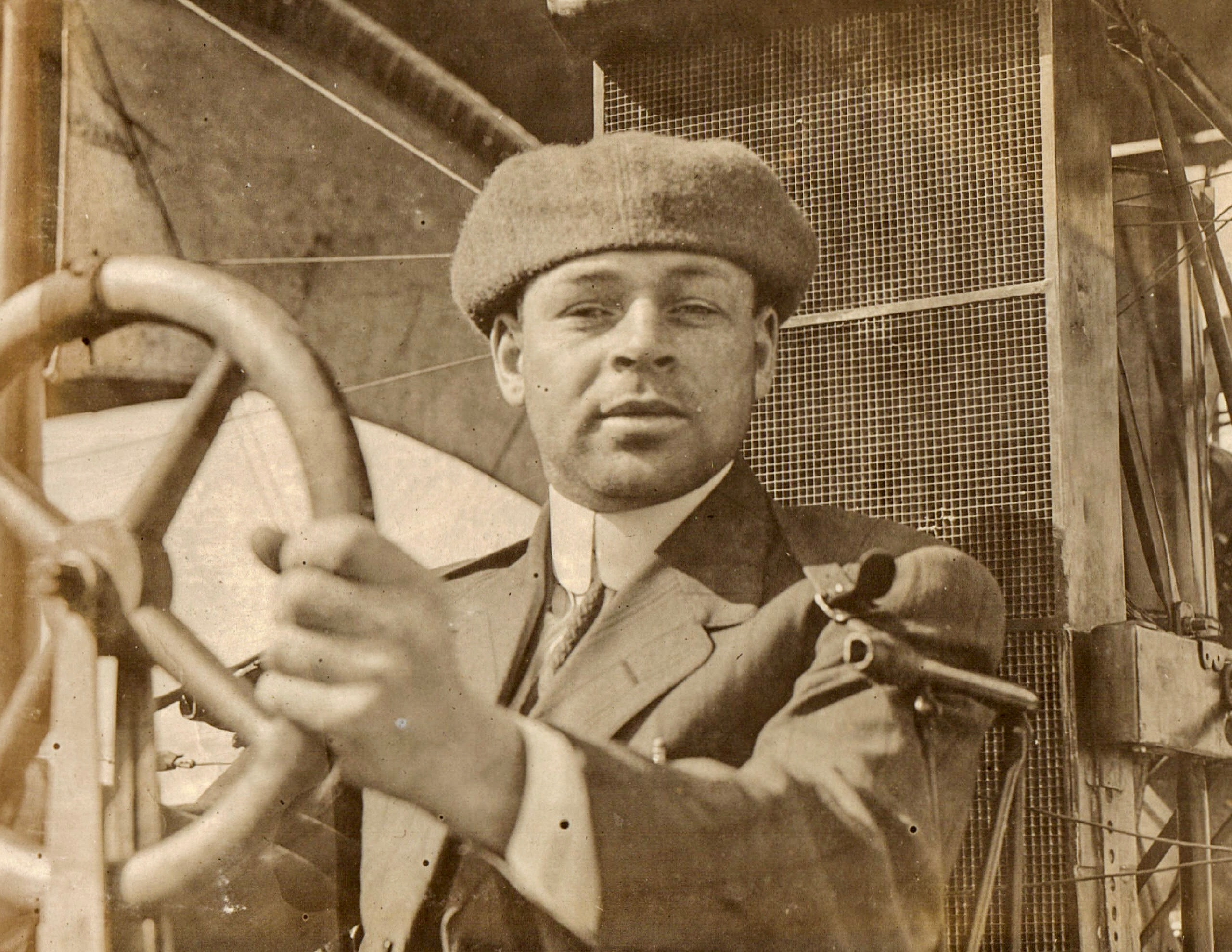
- Emory in pilot's seat, 1912
- Born: December 29, 1881; Seven Points, Pennsylvania
- Died: January 23, 1959 (aged 77); Philadelphia, Pennsylvania
- Occupations: Aviator, airplane mechanic, carpenter, master tile layer
- Known for: Pioneer aviator in Central Pennsylvania (1911)
- Children: none

Emory Conrad Malick (December 29, 1881 – January 23, 1959) was an early American pilot from the state of Pennsylvania, United States. He was an early graduate of the Curtiss Flying School, where he earned his International Pilot's License (FAI #105) on March 20, 1912. In March 2011, an article published in the Air & Space/Smithsonian touched off a controversy over Malick's identity. In 2023, the magazine retracted the article, writing that based on subsequent research, Malick identified as white, that this identification is consistent with the documentary and genealogical evidence, and "there is no evidence he was the first Black pilot". This decision was based upon his public records (i.e. census), not upon primary information or interviews with close family members, friends, or colleagues. Mixed family members in Central Pennsylvania were routinely listed as white. Of his immediate family, only Emory Malick and his paternal aunt, Alice Malick (1849-1926) were regarded as African American.

== Early life ==
Emory was born in Northumberland County, Pennsylvania, the third of six children born to Darius Malick, a carpenter from the same area, and Susan Conrad. Emory's mother died when he was five, and his father remarried shortly thereafter. By 1900, Emory was living on his own as a farm laborer. In 1910, he appears in both Lancaster, Pennsylvania and Philadelphia, Pennsylvania as a carpenter, like his father. With his father, Darius Malick, Emory helped build the capitol building in Harrisburg, as well as installing the mahogany veneering in the Pennsylvania Railroad dining and sleeping cars. In 1911, Mr. Malick became the first aviator to fly over central Pennsylvania, flying his homemade "aeroplane" over both Northumberland and Snyder Counties. On March 20, 1912, at the age of 30, Emory Conrad Malick earned an international pilot's license.

== Aviation career ==
The first record of Emory Malick's interest in aviation is July 22, 1911 when Emory is recorded as building a biplane in Seven Points, Northumberland County, Pennsylvania, where he would be attempting a flight that afternoon. His first successful flight in an engine-powered "aeroplane" was on July 24, 1911. Emory sought more formal flying training and in January 1912, Emory C. Malick of Philadelphia was enrolled in the Curtiss Aviation School in San Diego, California. Emory passed his flying test on 20 March 1912, and was awarded his international FAI (Federation Aeronautique Internationale) license #105 at the school, issued by the Aero Club of America. Glenn Curtiss declared him to be one of "the best flyers ever turned out by this school."

Emory C. Malick continued to appear regularly in the newspapers from 1914 through 1928. During this time, he is recorded as flying in central Pennsylvania, where he was the first aviator to fly over both Northumberland and Snyder Counties. He also worked in the Delaware Valley, flying out of airfields in Philadelphia and Camden Counties. In 1927, the first year that federal aviation licenses were issued, he earned Federal Transport License, #1716, as well as a Federal Mechanics License, #924. These licenses were issued through the Aeronautics Branch of the Department of Commerce (later the FAA), and were required for his ongoing work as a pilot for the Aero Service Corporation as well as Dallin Aerial Surveys. He also ran his Flying Dutchman Air Service with pilot and mechanic Ernest Buehl on the weekends.

On 4 March 1928, Mr. Malick took off from Crescent Airport in Camden with two passengers, when suddenly his engine died. In order to avoid crashing into the crowd of spectators and parked cars beneath him, he was able to bank the plane and crash land on the field, saving his passengers and himself. The headlines read, "Skill and Heroism of Emory C. Malick...Prevents Real Tragedy at Camden Yesterday" (Sunbury Daily Item), "Air Pilot's Skill Saves 3 in Crash" (Trenton Evening Times), and "Pilot Malick Saves Himself and Spectators in Making Heroic Landing" (Philadelphia Inquirer). The following 20 May, after years of successful flying, Mr. Malick suffered severe injuries in another crash, this one near Woodbury, NJ, where his passenger was killed. Due to the injury to his eyes, Emory Malick was grounded, and his transport license revoked.

That August, Mr. Malick, still on crutches, attended the dedication of the Sunbury Airport, where he displayed his first aeroplane engine. According to the Sunbury Daily Item, "Unsung and unheralded...was the man who was the first to play a plane over the city. Mr. Malick...came to Sunbury by train to attend the dedication of the local airport but was not called upon last night in the introduction of the air luminaries although he was probably the one deserving of highest honor...The Sunbury native is one of the real pioneers of aviation and boasts of 3000 flying hours, ranking him among the foremost of the country."

== Race question ==
The Air & Space/Smithsonian published a subsequently retracted article, entitled "The Unrecognized First" in March 2011 suggesting Emory was the first licensed black aviator. The claim was made by his great-niece, Mary Groce, based on Malick family photos, records, interviews, and historical documents, which she claimed showed him to be a black man. Ms. Groce said she is the granddaughter of Emory Malick's white-skinned sister, Annie Malick McCormick Groce, who was separated from her birth family as a young child, and who kept the family's African heritage a secret from her grandchildren, but wisely saved all the family records, as did her children, including Ms. Groce's father. She said, "I was never told about Emory or my mixed heritage."

Since that time, Mary Groce has written two children's books about her great-uncle, "Lila Tells the Story of Emory Conrad Malick, Our First Licensed Black Pilot," and "Aunt Cora's Wart, An Historical Faerie Tale: Nipper Fest!" Both books relate Groce's knowledge about her uncle Emory.

The following is a list of some examples of groups sharing the history of Emory Conrad Malick:

- Federal Aviation Administration Tweet honoring Emory Malick as first black person with a pilot's license in the United States
- United States Department of Veterans Affairs, Pittsburgh honoring Emory Malick as first African American to receive a pilot's license
- National Transportation Safety Board, Remarks to the Aero Club, February 26, 2015
- African American Registry, America's First Black Aviator, Emory Malick
- Glenn Curtiss Mansion mentions him training America's first licensed African-American aviator, Emory Conrad Malick

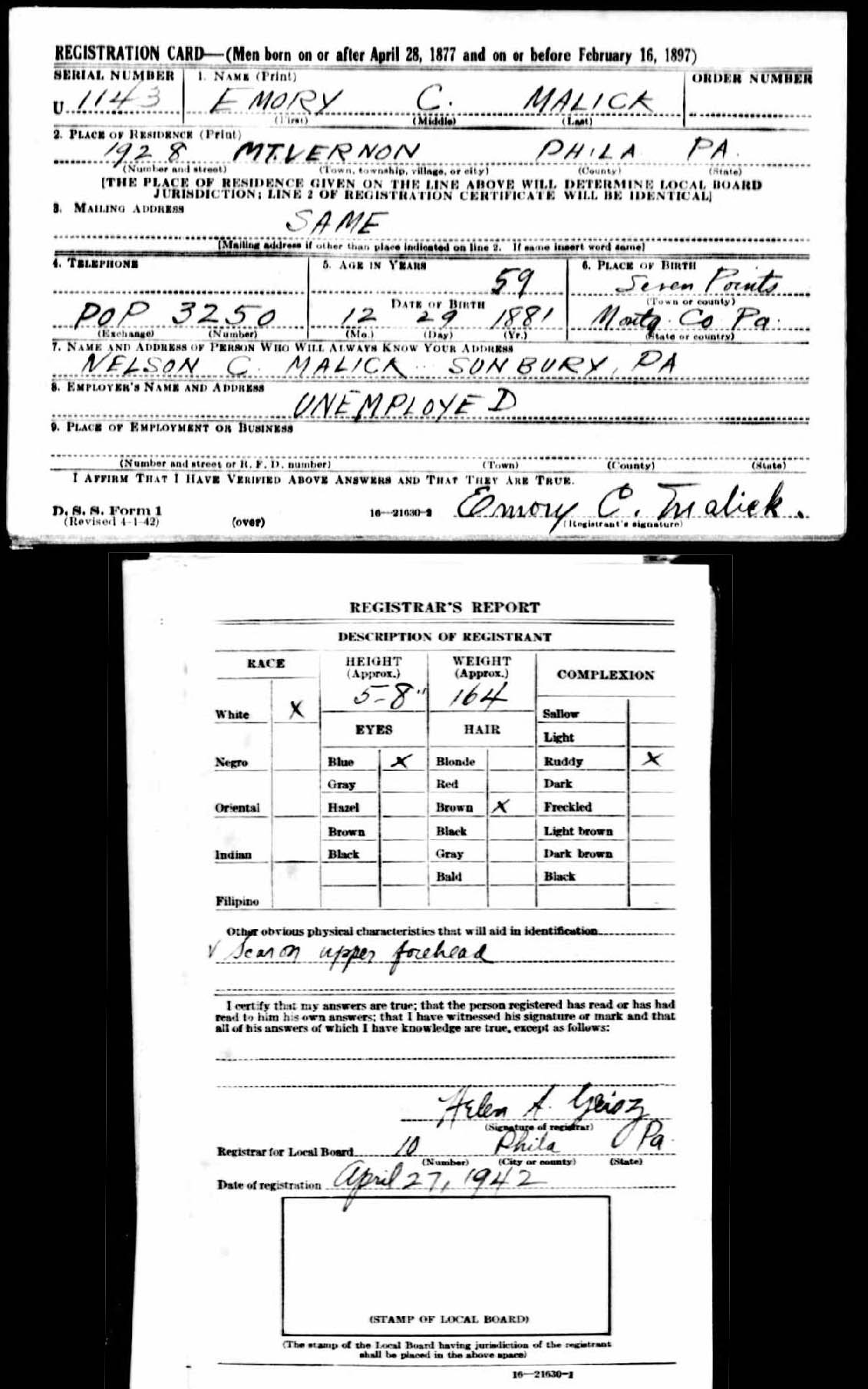

Since that time, Malick's white ethnicity has been demonstrated. All known public records show he was white. Among the public records saying that Malick was white are his draft registration cards from World War I in 1917 and World War II in 1942 . The first describes him as white, brown hair, and blue eyes. The latter describes him as white, ruddy complexion, brown hair, and blue eyes.

Other documents attesting to Emory Malick being white include:

- Emory's membership in the Independent Order of Odd Fellows, May 3, 1917 (a white-only organization at that time).
- Emory's listing in the 1900, 1910 and 1920 census records as white.
- Emory's Pennsylvania death certificate, signed December 24, 1959, lists him as white.

In 2023, the original article in the Smithsonian Air & Space magazine was retracted based on subsequent research done by the National Air and Space Museum and the National Museum of African American History and Culture, concluding that the documentary and genealogical evidence demonstrates that Malick was white, that he identified as white, and that there is no evidence he was the first Black pilot.

== Emory's extended family ==
In addition, the following documents attest to Malick's extended family identifying and being recorded as white:

- Malick's paternal grandparents Daniel and Lavina: white in 1850, 1860, 1870, and 1880 census
- Malick's maternal grandparents William and Anna: white in 1840, 1850, 1860, and 1870 census
- Malick's father Darius: white in 1860, 1870, 1880, 1900, 1910, 1920, and 1930 census, death certificate
- Malick's mother Susan: white in 1860, 1870, and 1880 census
- Malick's older brother Nelson: white in death certificate, 1880, 1900, 1910, 1920, 1930, and 1940 census, World War I draft (blue eyes, brown hair), World War II draft (sallow complexion, blue eyes, gray hair), death certificate
- Malick's older sister Cordelia: white in 1880 census (died young)
- Malick's younger sister Laura: white in 1900, 1910, 1920, and 1930 census
- Malick's younger sister Cora: white in 1918 death certificate

In October 2017, members of the Conrad family, distant relatives of Malick's mother, created a web page highlighting Malick's aviation exploits as well as providing source documents on his family's background. On October 18, 2017, an article appeared in the Sunbury American entitled "Emory Conrad Malick, Sunbury's First Aviator and Controversial Claims" highlighting the evidence contradicting the claims that Malick was black.
