= History of American Airlines =

American Airlines was formed through the merger of 80 carriers in 1930. Since then, American has completed several major mergers with other carriers including Trans Caribbean Airways in 1971, Air California in 1987, Reno Air in 1999, Trans World Airlines (TWA) in 2001, and US Airways in 2013.

== Predecessors ==
American Airlines' earliest predecessor company to commence operations was Robertson Aircraft Corporation, which began mail flights on April 15, 1926.

== Early history ==
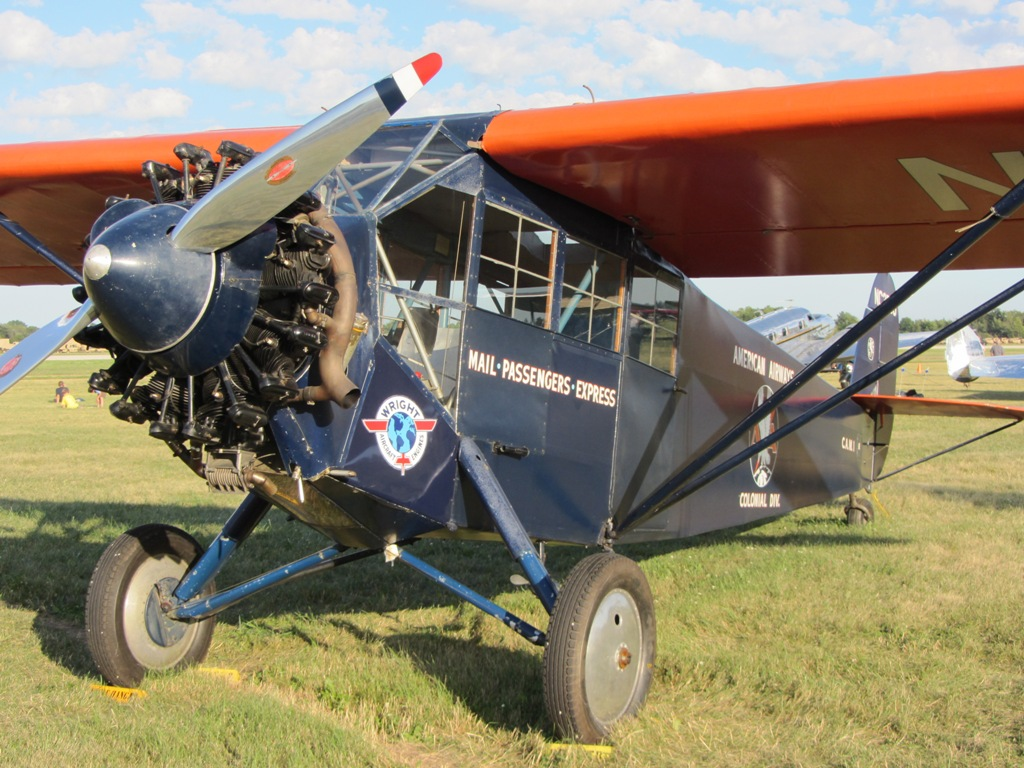
1927 American Airways FC-2

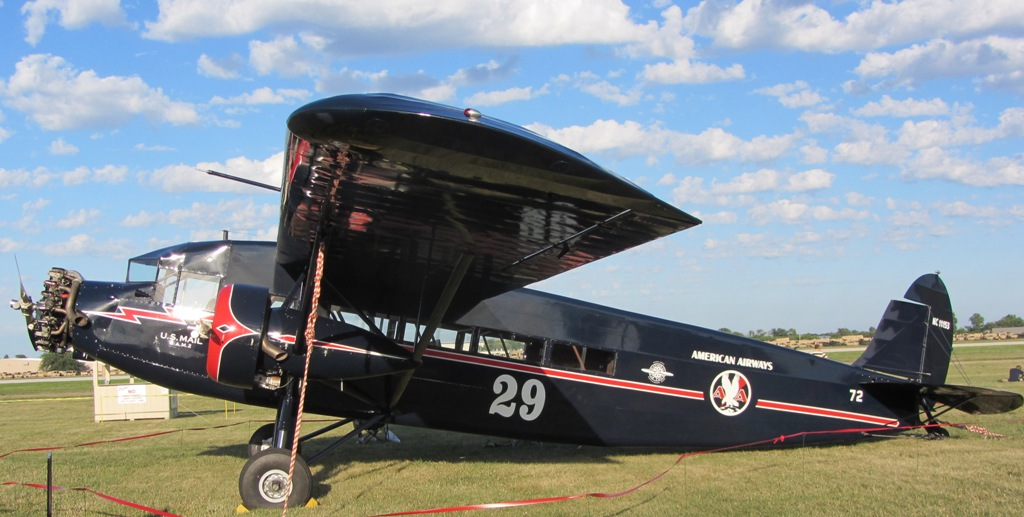
A Stinson Trimotor first operated by Century Airlines

DC-3 "Flagship", American's chief aircraft type during the World War II period

American Airlines was developed from a conglomeration of 82 small airlines through acquisitions in 1930 and reorganizations; initially, American Airways was a common brand used by a number of independent carriers. These included Southern Air Transport in Texas, Southern Air Fast Express (SAFE) in the western United States, Universal Aviation in the Midwest (which operated a transcontinental air/rail route in 1929), Thompson Aeronautical Services (which operated a Detroit-Cleveland route beginning in 1929), and Colonial Air Transport in the Northeast. Like many early carriers, American earned its keep carrying U.S. Mail. By 1933, American Airways operated a transcontinental route network serving 72 cities, mostly in the northeastern, midwestern, and southwestern United States.

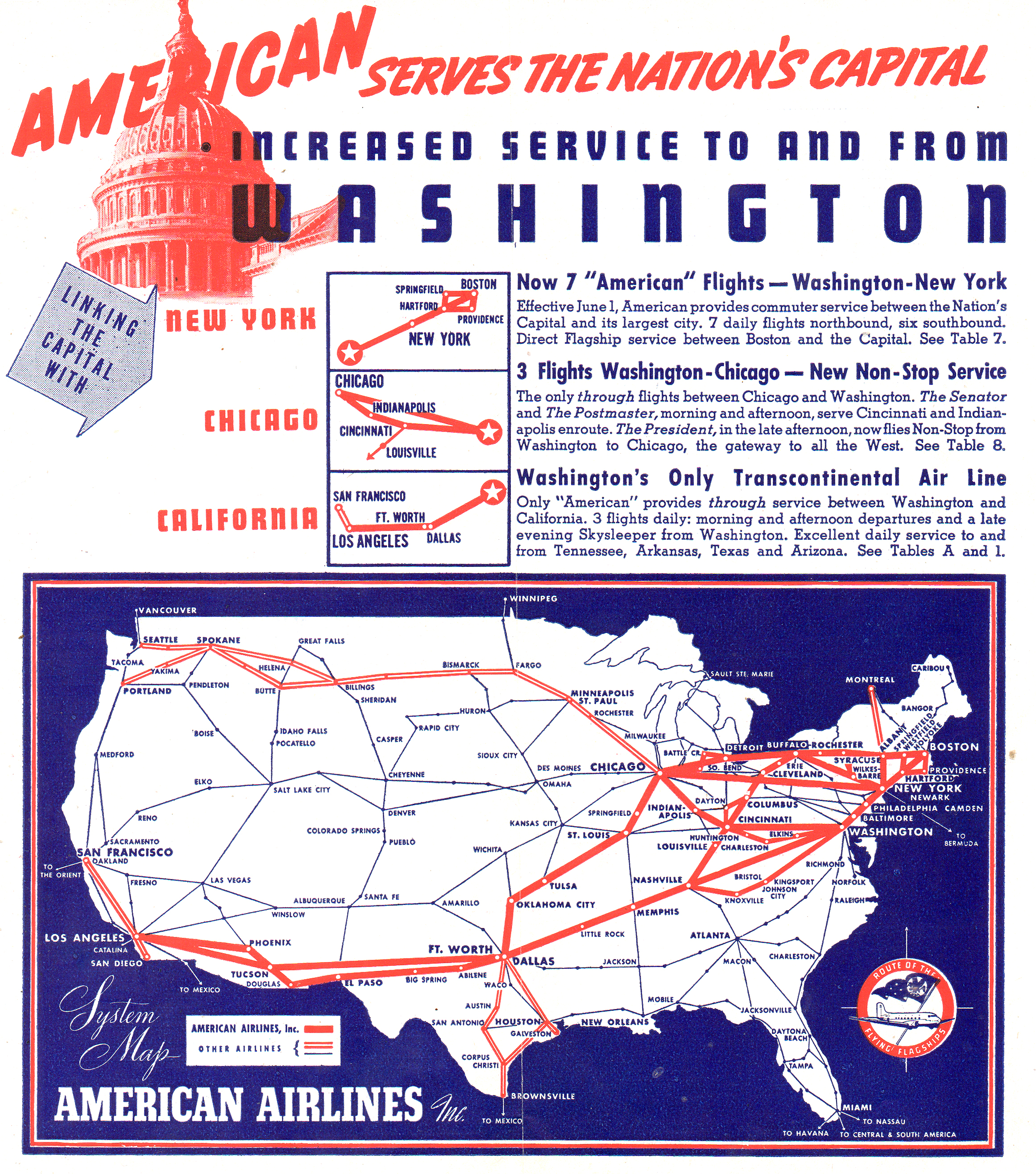
System map, August 1939

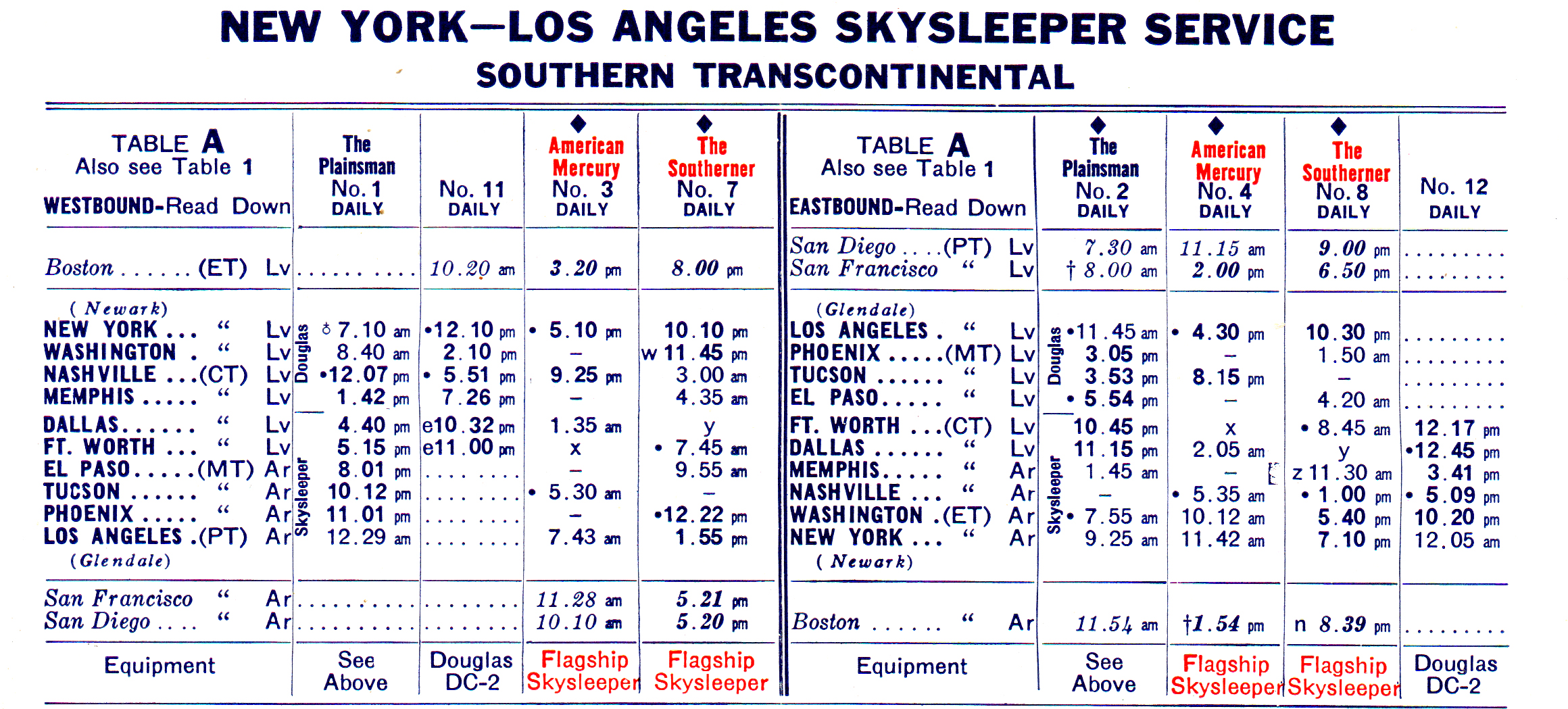
NY-LA service 1939

In 1934, American Airways Company was acquired by E. L. Cord, who renamed it "American Air Lines". Cord hired Texas businessman C. R. Smith to run the company. Smith worked with Donald Douglas to develop the DC-3, which American Airlines was first to fly, in 1936. American's DC-3 made it the first airline to be able to operate a route that could earn a profit solely by transporting passengers; other carriers could not earn a profit without U.S. Mail. With the DC-3, American began calling its aircraft "Flagships" and establishing the Admirals Club for valued passengers. The DC-3s had a four-star "admiral's pennant" outside the cockpit window while the aircraft was parked. American operated daily overnight transcontinental service between New York and Los Angeles through Dallas/Fort Worth and other intermediate stops, advertising the service as an "all-year southern route."

American Airlines was the first to cooperate with Fiorello LaGuardia to build an airport in New York City, and became owner of the world's first airline lounge at the new LaGuardia Airport (LGA), known as the Admirals Club. Membership was initially by invitation only, later changing to an open policy that accepted members who paid dues.

For more than eight decades, American Airlines' "signature" service has been its daily transcontinental flights between New York and Los Angeles designated as #1 (westbound) and #2 (eastbound). While the current 2,500 miles non-stop jet service between John F. Kennedy International Airport (JFK) and Los Angeles International Airport (LAX) averages six hours, in 1939 Flight #1 (which departed from Newark Airport in New Jersey at 7:10 a.m. Eastern Time and terminated at Glendale Airport in suburban Los Angeles at 12:29 am Pacific Time) took 20 hours and 19 minutes to complete, made eight intermediate stops (in Washington, DC; Nashville, TN; Memphis, TN; Dallas, TX; Ft. Worth, TX; El Paso, TX; Tucson, AZ; and Phoenix, AZ), and had a change of planes from a DC-2 to a DC-3 "Flagship Skysleeper" in Memphis. Although on March 1, 1962, Flight #1, operated by a Boeing 707 (N7506A), crashed in Jamaica Bay two minutes after takeoff from Idlewild (now JFK) Airport, killing all 87 passengers and 8 crew on board, American Airlines retained #1 as the flight number of the service instead of retiring it, as is the general practice after a fatal accident.

== Post war ==
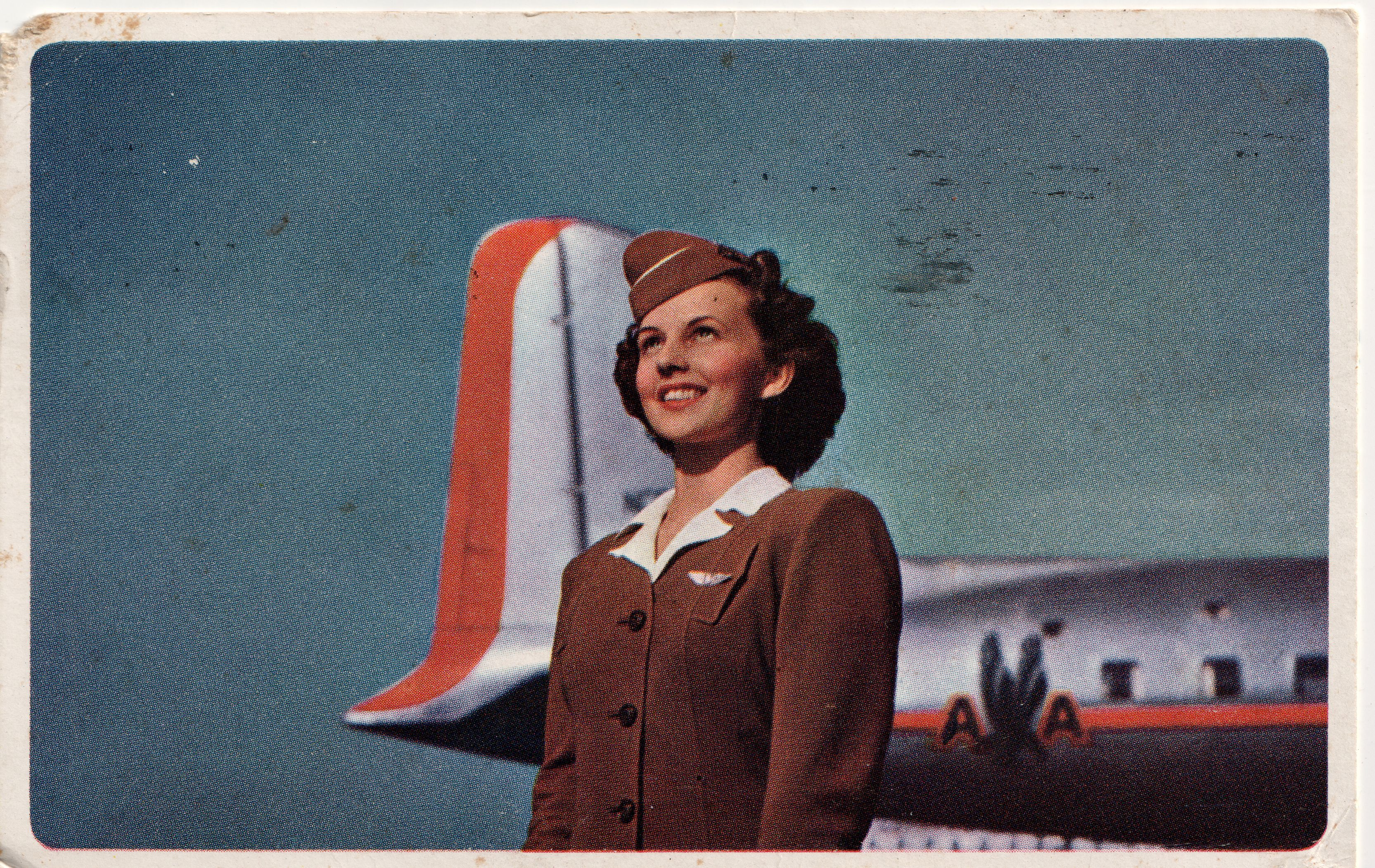
American Airlines flight attendant in the 1940s

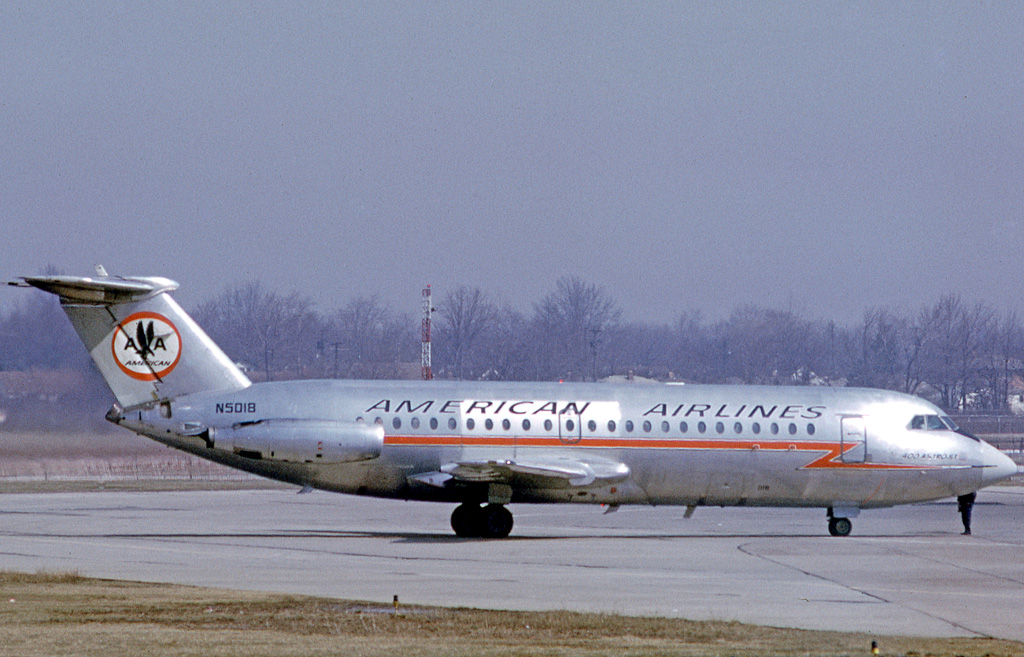
American Airlines BAC 1–11 short-haul jet airliner at Cleveland Hopkins Airport in 1971 wearing the early jet era color scheme

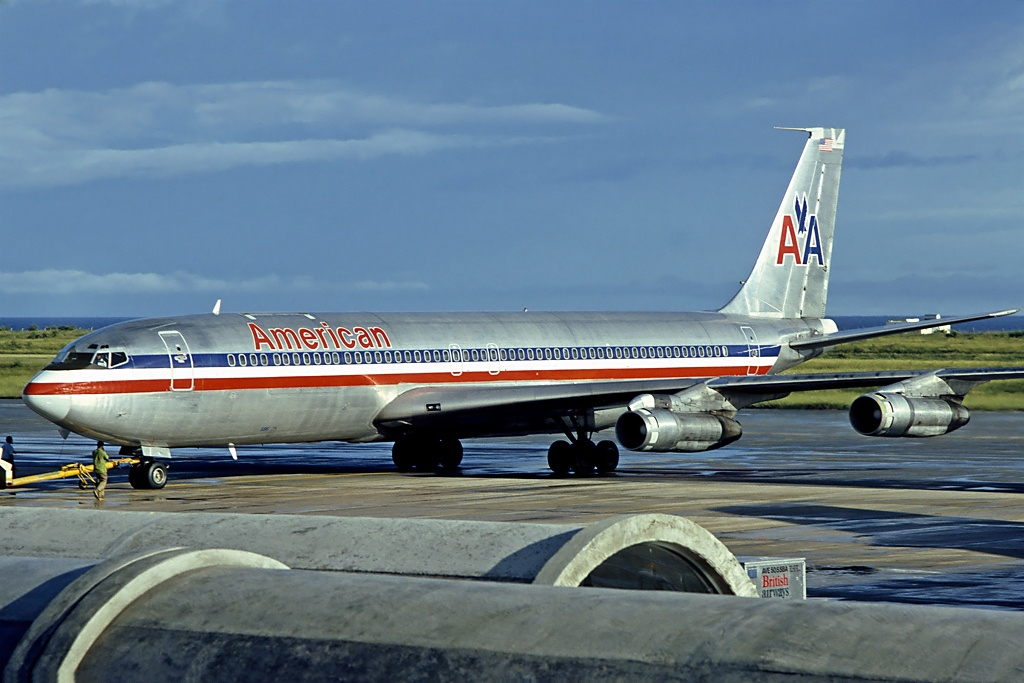
A Boeing 707-320C in the post-1967 Vignelli livery

After World War II American acquired American Export Airlines, renaming it as American Overseas Airways, to serve Europe. AOA was sold to Pan Am in 1950. AA launched another subsidiary, American Airlines de Mexico S.A., to fly to Mexico and built several airports there. American Airlines provided advertising and free usage of its aircraft in the 1951 film Three Guys Named Mike. Until Capital merged into United in 1961 AA was the largest American airline, which meant second-largest in the world, after Aeroflot.

American Airlines ordered British-built de Havilland Comets; the orders were canceled when the Comets were found to suffer serious metal fatigue. American Airlines introduced transcontinental Boeing 707s on January 25, 1959, and invested $440 million in jet aircraft up to 1962, launched the first electronic booking system, Sabre, with IBM, and built a terminal at Idlewild (now JFK) Airport in New York City, which became the airline's largest base. Vignelli Associates designed the AA eagle logo in 1967. Vignelli attributes the introduction of his firm to American Airlines to Henry Dreyfuss, the legendary AA design consultant. The logo was in use until January 17, 2013.

In 1966, American Airlines published a specification to manufacturers to offer a widebody aircraft smaller than Boeing 747, but capable of flying similar long-range routes from airports with shorter runways. McDonnell Douglas proposed the DC-10 trijet as a response. On February 19, 1968, President of American Airlines George A. Spater, and James S. McDonnell of McDonnell Douglas announced American's intention to acquire the DC-10. American Airlines ordered 25 DC-10s in its first order. The DC-10 made its first flight on August 29, 1970, and received its type certificate from the FAA on July 29, 1971. On August 5, 1971, American's DC-10 made the type's first commercial service on a round trip flight between Los Angeles and Chicago. Lockheed Corporation also responded with the L-1011 TriStar, but lost interest from American Airlines due to higher price.

In 1970 American Airlines had flights from St. Louis, Chicago, and New York to Honolulu and on to Sydney and Auckland via American Samoa and Nadi, Fiji. In 1971, American acquired Trans Caribbean Airways. On March 30, 1973, American became the first major airline to employ a female pilot when Bonnie Tiburzi was hired to fly Boeing 727s. American Airlines has been innovative in other aspects, initiating several of the industry's major competitive developments including computer reservations systems, frequent flyer loyalty programs, and two-tier wage scales.

Revenue passenger-miles (millions)(Scheduled service only)
	American	Trans Caribbean
1951	2,554	–
1955	4,358	–
1960	6,371	208
1965	9,195	433
1970	16,623	819
1975	20,871	(merged 1971)

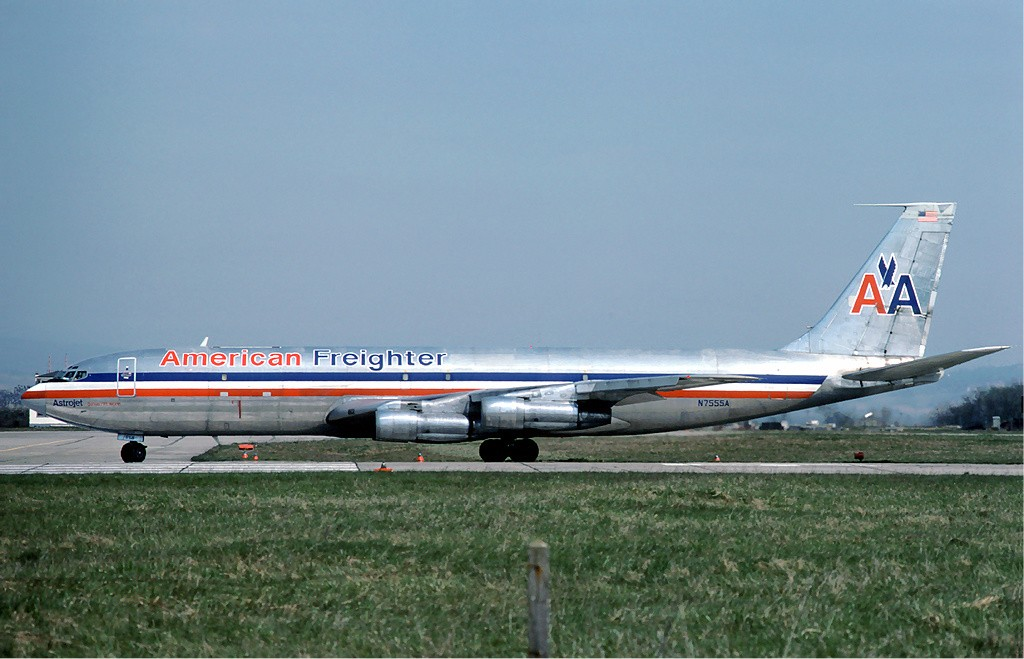
Boeing 707 of American Freighter at EuroAirport Basel-Mulhouse-Freiburg in France (near Basel) in 1976

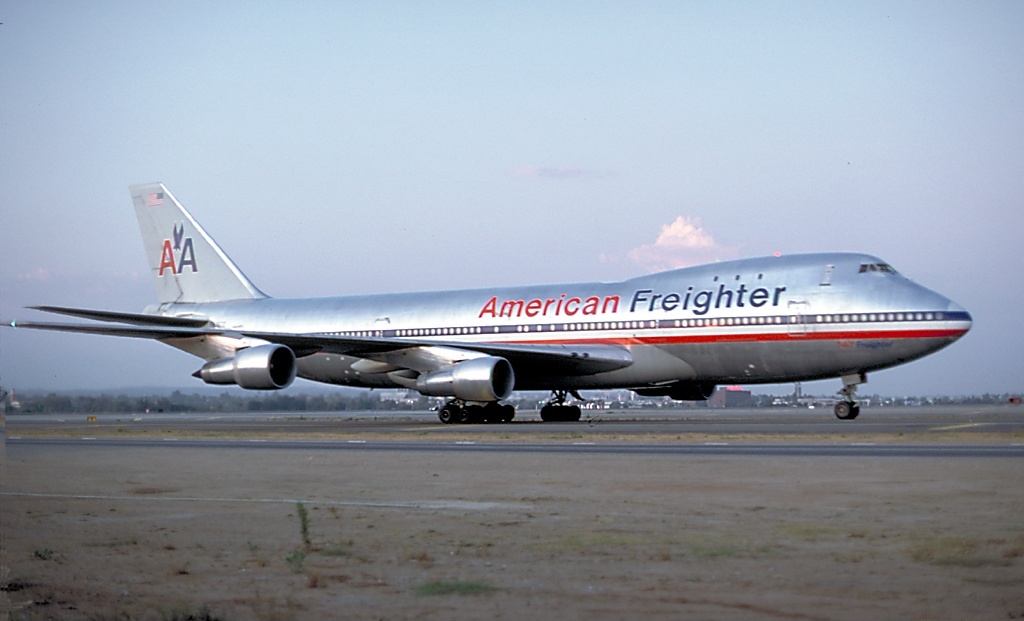
American Boeing 747-100 Freighter.

American operated a cargo operation called American Freighter until 1984, using cargo-only Boeing 707 and Boeing 747 aircraft that had previously been used in passenger service.

== 1980s–1990s ==
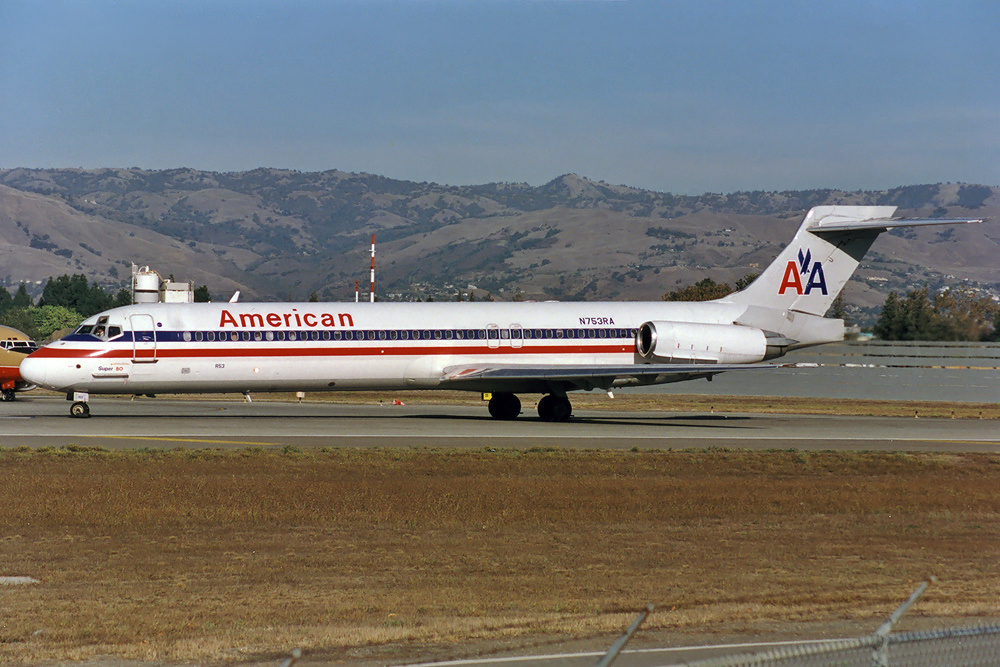
American briefly operated the McDonnell Douglas MD-87 after acquiring Reno Air. This example has a white fuselage instead of a bare metal one.

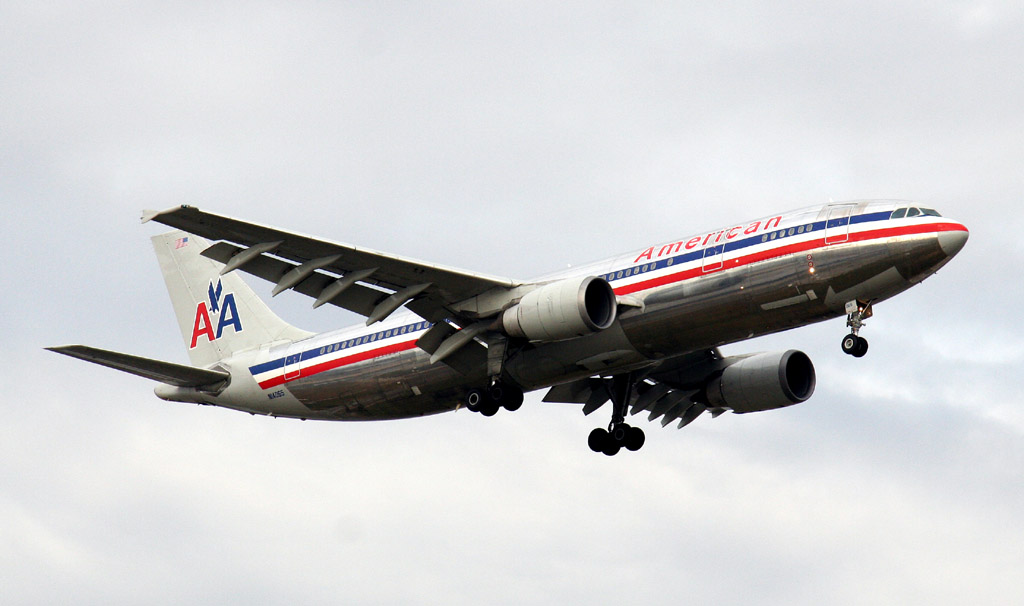
Airbus A300-600

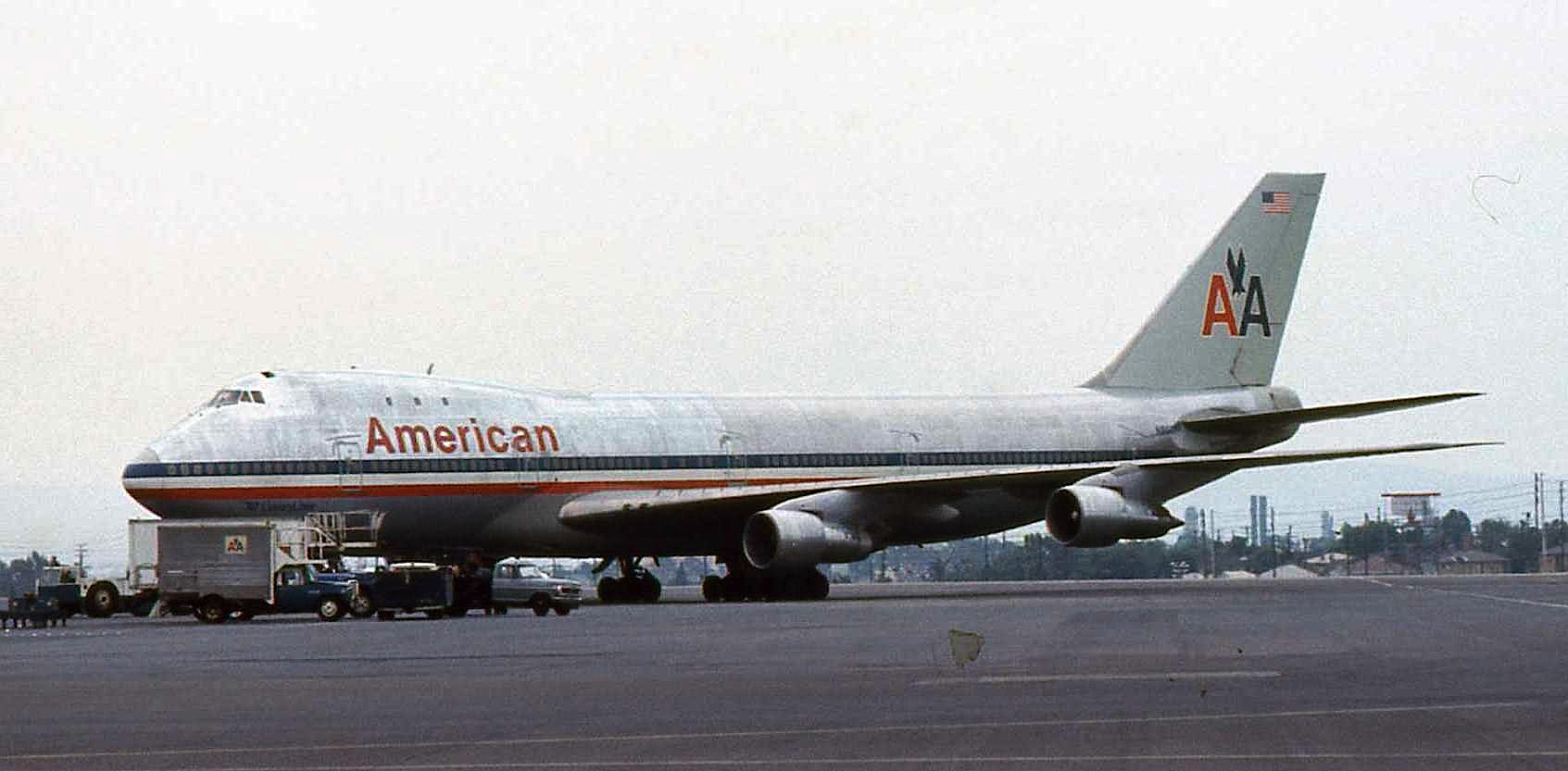
An American Boeing 747-100 at Los Angeles International Airport. This type was retired in 1985.

After moving its headquarters to Fort Worth, Texas from New York City in 1979, American Airlines changed to a hub-and-spoke system in 1981, opening its first hub at Dallas/Fort Worth International Airport. American opened a second hub in the new Terminal 3 at Chicago O'Hare in 1982, and began transatlantic service between Dallas and London in May 1982. Led by its new chairman and CEO, Robert Crandall, American expanded its service from these hubs through the 1980s, adding service to other European destinations as well as Japan.

In the late 1980s, American Airlines opened three hubs for north–south traffic. San Jose International Airport was added after American purchased AirCal. American built a terminal and runway at Raleigh-Durham International Airport for the growing Research Triangle Park nearby, and to compete with USAir's hub in Charlotte/Douglas International Airport. Nashville International Airport was also added as a hub. American also planned a north–south hub at Stapleton International Airport in Denver during the mid-1980s, but postponed those plans due to the planned development of Denver International Airport.

In 1988, American Airlines acquired a 7.5% stake in Air New Zealand.

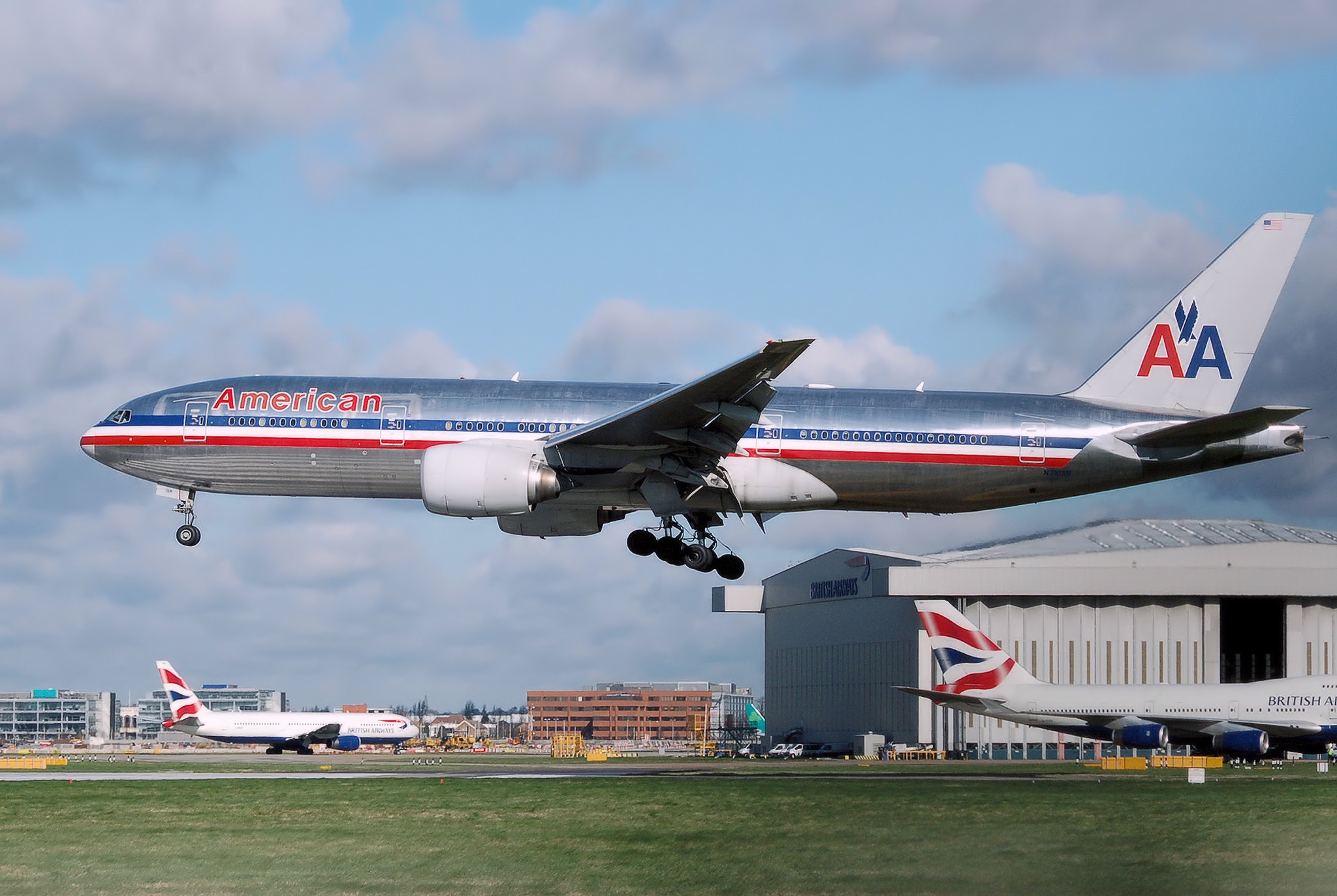
Boeing 777-200ER landing at Heathrow Airport

Revenue Passenger-Kilometers, scheduled flights only, in millions
Year	Traffic
1980	45,347
1985	71,027
1991	132,313
1995	165,247
2000	187,542
2005	222,449
2011	219,492
2013	346,878

In 1991, American Airlines bought the assets of TWA's operations at London Heathrow for $445 million. Until open skies came into effect in April 2008, American Airlines and United Airlines were the only U.S. carriers permitted to serve Heathrow.

American took delivery of 19 McDonnell Douglas MD-11 aircraft starting in 1991, aiming to operate long-haul routes such as DFW-Hong Kong. However, the aircraft's performance was disappointing, and American agreed to sell its MD-11 fleet to FedEx in 1995. The following year, American placed what was then the largest aircraft order in history, agreeing to buy up to 630 Boeing aircraft including the Boeing 777 and Boeing 737.

Lower fuel prices and a favorable business climate led to higher profits in the 1990s. The industry's expansion was not lost on pilots who on February 17, 1997, went on strike for higher wages. President Bill Clinton invoked the Railway Labor Act citing economic impact to the United States, quashing the strike. Pilots settled for wages lower than their demands.

The three new hubs were abandoned in the 1990s: some San Jose facilities were sold to Reno Air, and at Raleigh/Durham to Midway Airlines. Midway went out of business in 2003. American Airlines purchased Reno Air in February 1999 and integrated its operations on 31 August 1999, but did not resume hub operations in San Jose. American discontinued most of Reno Air's routes, and sold most of the Reno Air aircraft, as it did with Air California 12 years earlier. The only remaining route from the Air California and Reno Air purchases is from San Francisco to Los Angeles.

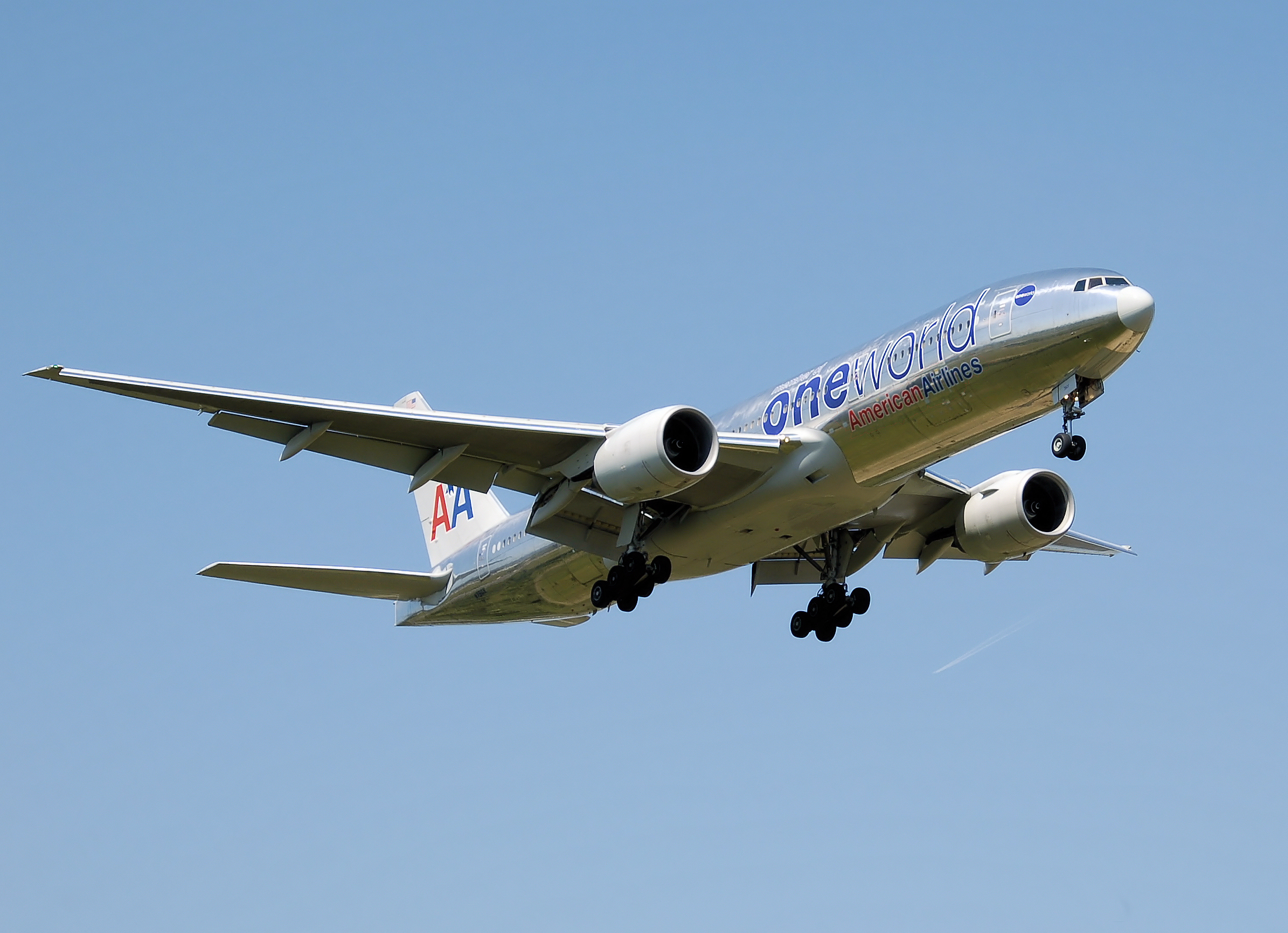
Boeing 777-200ER in Oneworld livery

During this time, concern over airline bankruptcies and falling stock prices brought a warning from American's CEO Robert Crandall. "I've never invested in any airline", Crandall said. "I'm an airline manager. I don't invest in airlines. And I always said to the employees of American, 'This is not an appropriate investment. It's a great place to work and it's a great company that does important work. But airlines are not an investment.'" Crandall noted that since airline deregulation of the 1970s, 150 airlines had gone out of business. "A lot of people came into the airline business. Most of them promptly exited, minus their money," he said.

Miami International Airport became a hub after American Airlines bought Central and South American routes ("El Interamericano") from Eastern Air Lines in 1990 (inherited from Braniff International Airways but originated by Pan American-Grace Airways which was known as Panagra). Through the 1990s, American Airlines expanded its network in Latin America to become the dominant U.S. carrier in the region.

On October 15, 1998, American Airlines became the first airline to offer electronic ticketing in the 44 countries it serves.

In 1999, American Airlines, British Airways, Cathay Pacific, Canadian Airlines, and Qantas founded the global airline alliance Oneworld.

== 2000s ==
Robert Crandall left in 1998 and was replaced by Donald J. Carty, who negotiated the purchase of the near-bankrupt Trans World Airlines (it would file for its third bankruptcy as part of the purchase agreement) and its hub in St. Louis in April 2001. American Airlines began losing money in the economic downturn that followed the September 11 attacks, which destroyed two of its planes. Carty negotiated wage and benefit agreements with the unions but resigned after union leaders discovered he was planning to award executive compensation packages at the same time. This undermined AA's attempts to increase trust with its workforce and to increase its productivity. Carty was terminated by the AMR Board on April 24, 2003. He was replaced as CEO by Gerard Arpey, and as chairman by Edward A. Brennan. The St. Louis hub was downsized, AA rolled back its "More Room Throughout Coach" program (which eliminated several rows of seats on certain aircraft), ended three-class service on many international flights, and standardized its fleet at each hub. However, the airline also expanded into new markets, including Ireland, India, and mainland China. On July 20, 2005, American announced a quarterly profit for the first time in 17 quarters; the airline earned $58 million in the second quarter of 2005.

AA was a strong backer of the Wright Amendment, which regulated commercial airline operations at Love Field in Dallas. On June 15, 2006, American agreed with Southwest Airlines and the cities of Dallas and Fort Worth to seek repeal of the Wright Amendment on condition that Love Field remained a domestic airport and its gate capacity be limited.

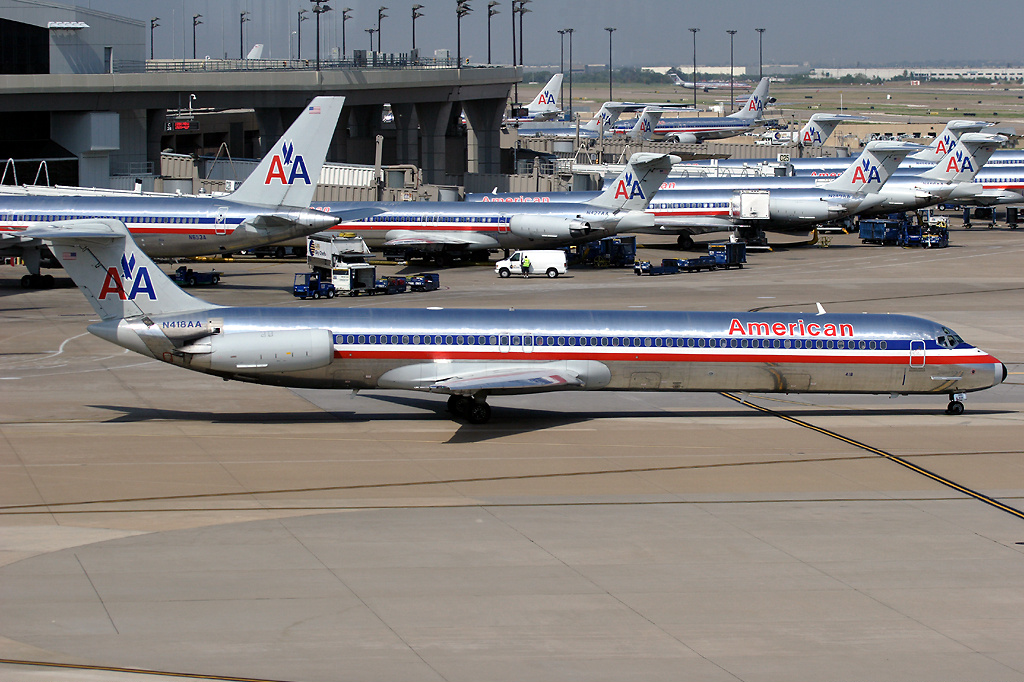
Numerous American Airlines aircraft at Dallas/Fort Worth International Airport in September 2005

The 2008 financial crisis again placed strain on the airline. On July 2, 2008, American furloughed 950 flight attendants, via Texas' Worker Adjustment and Retraining Notification Act system, in addition to the furlough of 20 MD-80 aircraft. American's hub at Luis Muñoz Marín International Airport in San Juan, Puerto Rico was truncated from 38 to 18 daily inbound flights. All Airbus A300 jets were retired by the end of August 2009 and are stored in Roswell, New Mexico.

American also closed its Kansas City overhaul base, inherited from TWA. On August 13, 2008, The Kansas City Star reported that American would move some overhaul work from the base, with repairs on Boeing 757s moved to Tulsa, Oklahoma along with one or two Boeing 767 repair lines; the city's aviation department offered to upgrade repair facilities on condition that the airline maintains at least 700 jobs. On October 28, 2009, American notified its employees that it would close the Kansas City base in September 2010, and would also close or make cutbacks at five smaller maintenance stations, resulting in the loss of up to 700 jobs. American closed its maintenance base at Kansas City (MCI) on September 24, 2010.

American had repeated run-ins with the FAA regarding maintenance of its MD-80 fleet, canceling 1,000 flights to inspect wire bundles over three days in April 2008 to make sure they complied with government safety regulations. In September 2009, the Associated Press and The Wall Street Journal reported that American was accused of hiding repeated maintenance lapses on at least 16 MD-80s from the FAA. Repair issues included such items as faulty emergency slides, improper engine coatings, incorrectly drilled holes, and other examples of shoddy workmanship. The most serious alleged lapse is a failure to repair cracks to pressure bulkheads; the rupture of a bulkhead could lead to cabin depressurization. It is also alleged that the airline retired one airplane in order to hide it from FAA inspectors. American began the process of replacing its older MD-80 jets with Boeing 737s and Airbus A319s and A321s.

American was a key player in the 2009–11 restructuring of Japan Airlines. In September 2009, AMR Corporation showed interest in buying part of the financially struggling JAL, while rival Delta Air Lines was also looking into investing in the troubled airline along with its SkyTeam partner Air France-KLM. Japan Airlines called off negotiations of the possible deal with all airlines on October 5, 2009. Delta, with help from TPG, made a bid of $1 billion in November 2009 for JAL to partner with them; two days later, reports came from Japan that AA and TPG had teamed up and made a $1.5 billion cash offer to JAL. In February 2010, JAL officially announced that it would strengthen its relationship with American Airlines and Oneworld. This led to an enhanced joint venture between American and JAL beginning April 1, 2011.

== 2010s ==
In early July 2010, it was reported that American Airlines was trying to find buyers for its regional airline American Eagle. The move followed Delta Air Lines and the spin-off of its wholly owned regional airlines Compass Airlines and Mesaba Airlines.

American began a joint venture with British Airways and Iberia Airlines in October 2010, which included frequent flyer reciprocity. The USDOT granted AA preliminary antitrust immunity for the venture in February 2010, and the partnership was officially approved by the USDOT on 20 July 2010.

American also began an interlining partnership with JetBlue Airways in March 2010, which covered 27 JetBlue destinations not served by American and 13 American international destinations from New York and Boston. American gave JetBlue eight slot pairs (arrival and departure slots) at Ronald Reagan Washington National Airport and one slot pair at Westchester County Airport, in return for which JetBlue gave American 12 slot pairs at JFK Airport. Effective November 18, 2010, the two airlines would give travelers miles in either airline's frequent flyer program when flying on a qualifying route, regardless of whether the travels include an international connection.

American expanded its service to Asia and the Pacific. It was one of the initial US bidders in February 2010 to serve Tokyo's Haneda Airport, and was awarded rights to serve Haneda from New York JFK. American planned to begin JFK-Haneda service in January 2011 but postponed the service until February 2011 citing low booking demand, ultimately terminating its JFK-Narita service in favor of JFK-Haneda service in June 2012. American later canceled its JFK-Haneda service in October 2013 due to the service being "quite unprofitable" due to the time constraints at Haneda Airport. American also began service between Los Angeles and Shanghai in 2011 and between Dallas/Fort Worth and Seoul in 2013, and from Dallas/Fort Worth International Airport to both Shanghai and Hong Kong in the summer of 2014, providing the first ever nonstop service between Dallas/Fort Worth and China. In October 2014, American filed a report to the DOT to launch flights from Los Angeles to Tokyo-Haneda in place of Delta's Seattle-Tacoma operating slot, sparking a war that lasted for over eight months. American was originally granted the slot as a back-up to Delta's Seattle-Haneda route if it failed to operate on a daily basis on March 28, 2015, (which would give the operating rights to American), but in June 2015, Delta announced the cancellation of its Seattle-Haneda service, claiming the daily operation was not feasible due to the route not being an economically viable one in the Seattle market due to certain regulatory and market conditions. American launched daily service from Los Angeles to Tokyo-Haneda on February 11, 2016, using their Boeing 787 aircraft. American also added daily service from Los Angeles to Sydney, Auckland and Hong Kong on their flagship Boeing 777-300ER (to Sydney and Hong Kong) and Boeing 787-8 (to Auckland) respectively (the flights to Auckland and Sydney was replaced by Boeing 787-9 aircraft in Fall 2017), returning to Australia and New Zealand for the first time since the 1990s and providing the first ever non-stop service between the Continental U.S. and Australia and New Zealand on American Airlines. American added service from Los Angeles to Beijing on November 5, 2017, and has plans for more expansion in the Asia-Pacific region in the coming years. As of November 2017, American Airlines offers service to eight destinations in Asia and Oceania from its hubs in Los Angeles, Chicago and Dallas-Fort Worth, offering a total of fifteen routes.

Ending in late 2010, American Airlines was involved in a dispute with two online ticketing agencies, Expedia and Orbitz. This relates to American's "Direct Connect" fare booking system for large travel agents, which Expedia claimed might raise costs and was less transparent for passengers. The Direct Connect allows American to exert more control over its distribution, save costs, and better sell ancillary services to its customers. On December 1, 2010, American pulled its price listings from Orbitz, and on January 1, 2011, Expedia removed American Airlines' fares from its site.

American placed the "largest aircraft order in history" in July 2011, purchasing 460 "next generation" Boeing 737 and Airbus A320 aircraft for delivery between 2013 and 2022. These aircraft were designated to replace American's short and medium-haul fleet of 757-200, 767-200, and MD-80 aircraft, eventually consolidating the fleet around four aircraft families (Boeing 737, Airbus A320, Boeing 787, and Boeing 777). This goal was achieved in 2020. American Airlines became the second U.S. carrier to receive the new Boeing 787 in January 2015.

=== Bankruptcy of AMR Corporation ===
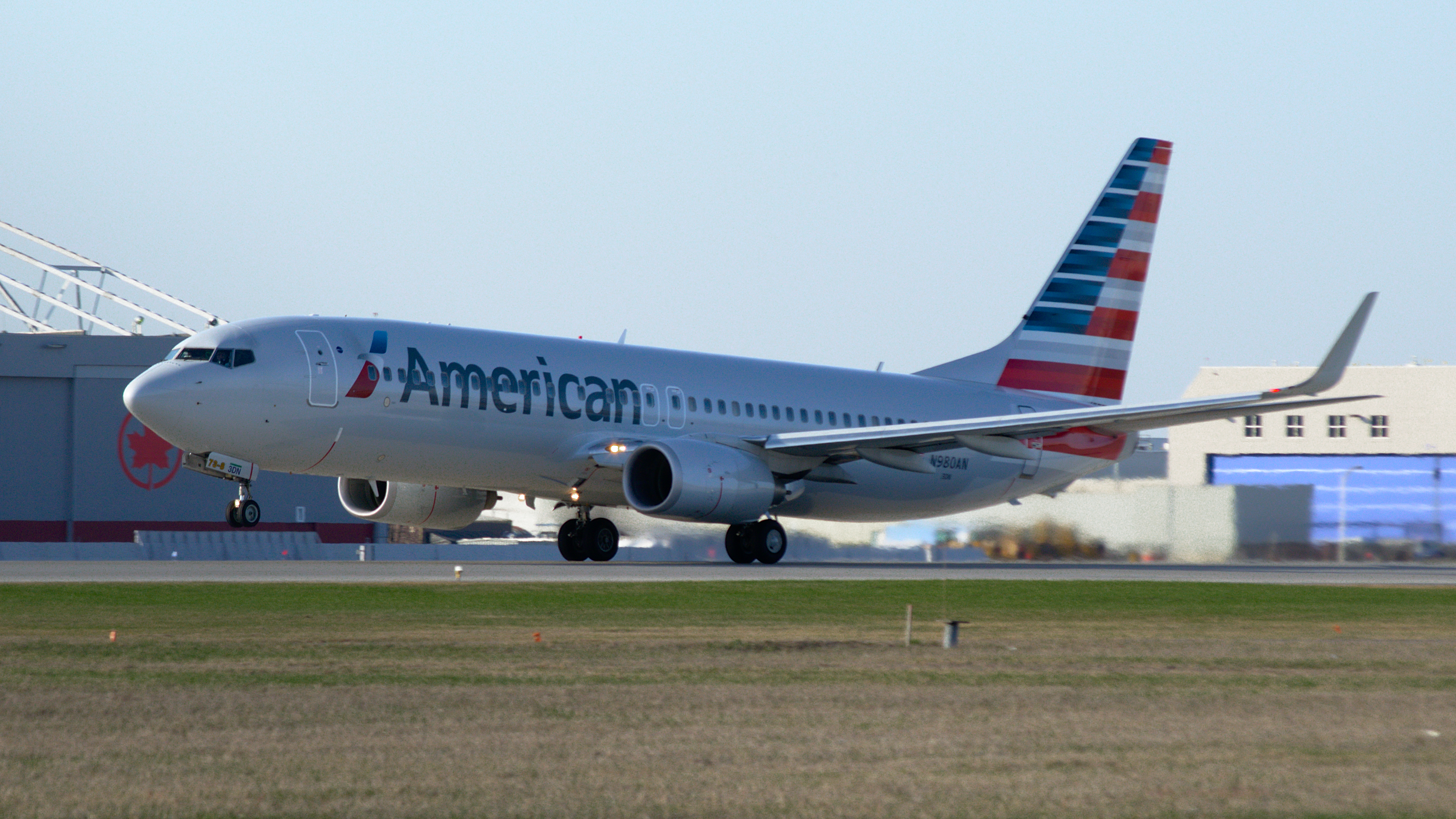
An American Airlines Boeing 737-800 with new livery taking off from Montréal–Pierre Elliott Trudeau International Airport in April 2013

AMR Corporation, then the parent company of American, filed for Chapter 11 bankruptcy protection on November 29, 2011, and American began capacity cuts on July 1, 2012, due to the grounding of several aircraft associated with its bankruptcy and lack of pilots due to retirements. American's regional airline, American Eagle, was to retire 35 to 40 regional jets as well as its Saab turboprop fleet. American ceased its service to Delhi, India in March 2012.

By summer 2012, American was considering merging with another airline as part of its restructuring plan. AMR was reportedly considering merger proposals involving US Airways, JetBlue, Alaska Airlines, Frontier Airlines, and Virgin America. On July 12, 2012, US Airways filed a statement to the court, saying that it had supported an American Airlines request to extend a period during which only American could file a bankruptcy reorganization plan ("exclusivity period"); in this filing, US Airways disclosed that it was an American Airlines creditor and prospective merger partner. On August 31, 2012, American Airlines and US Airways signed a nondisclosure agreement, which stated that the airlines would discuss their financials and a possible merger.

American notified more than 11,000 workers of possible job loss as part of its bankruptcy reorganization, and cut flights by one to two percent in September and October 2012. In October 2012, the airline announced plans to hire 2,500 pilots over two years to staff new international and domestic routes, with about 1,500 of the new hires replacing retiring pilots or jobs that open up due to attrition. The Allied Pilots Association, representing pilots of American Airlines, voted in December 2012 to ratify a tentative agreement between the company and the union.

On January 17, 2013, American introduced a new logo, livery, and brand image, unveiling the livery on its first Boeing 777-300ER aircraft which went into service later that month.

In October 2015, American announced that it would introduce a new "no-frills fare." This is mainly an effort to compete with low-cost carriers, such as JetBlue or Spirit Airlines. The new fares became available starting in 2016.

=== Merger with US Airways (2013) ===
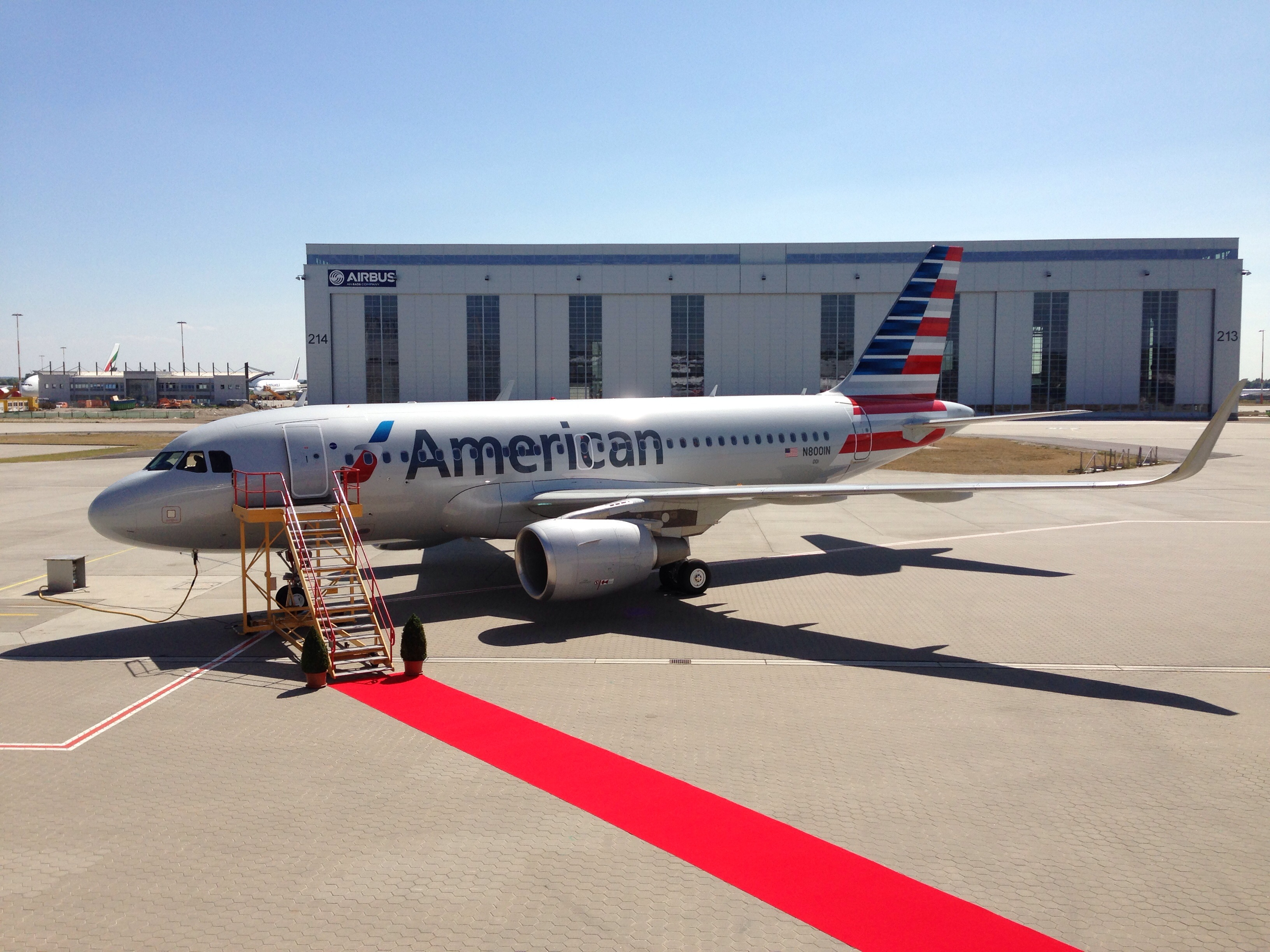
American's first Airbus A319 ready for delivery in July 2013 at Hamburg Finkenwerder Airport.

On February 14, 2013, AMR Corporation and US Airways Group officially announced that the two companies would merge to form the largest airline (and airline holding company) in the world, with bondholders of American Airlines parent AMR owning 72% of the new company and US Airways shareholders owning the remaining 28%. Rothschild & Co served as the investment bank for the transaction. The combined airline would carry the American Airlines name and branding, while US Airways' management team, including CEO Doug Parker, would retain most operational management positions, and the headquarters would be consolidated at American's current headquarters in Fort Worth, Texas. The merger would create the world's largest airline, which, along with United Airlines and Delta Air Lines, would control three-quarters of the U.S. market. Bankruptcy judge Sean Lane approved the merger in March while refusing to approve American CEO Tom Horton's $20 million golden parachute and deeming it "inappropriate."

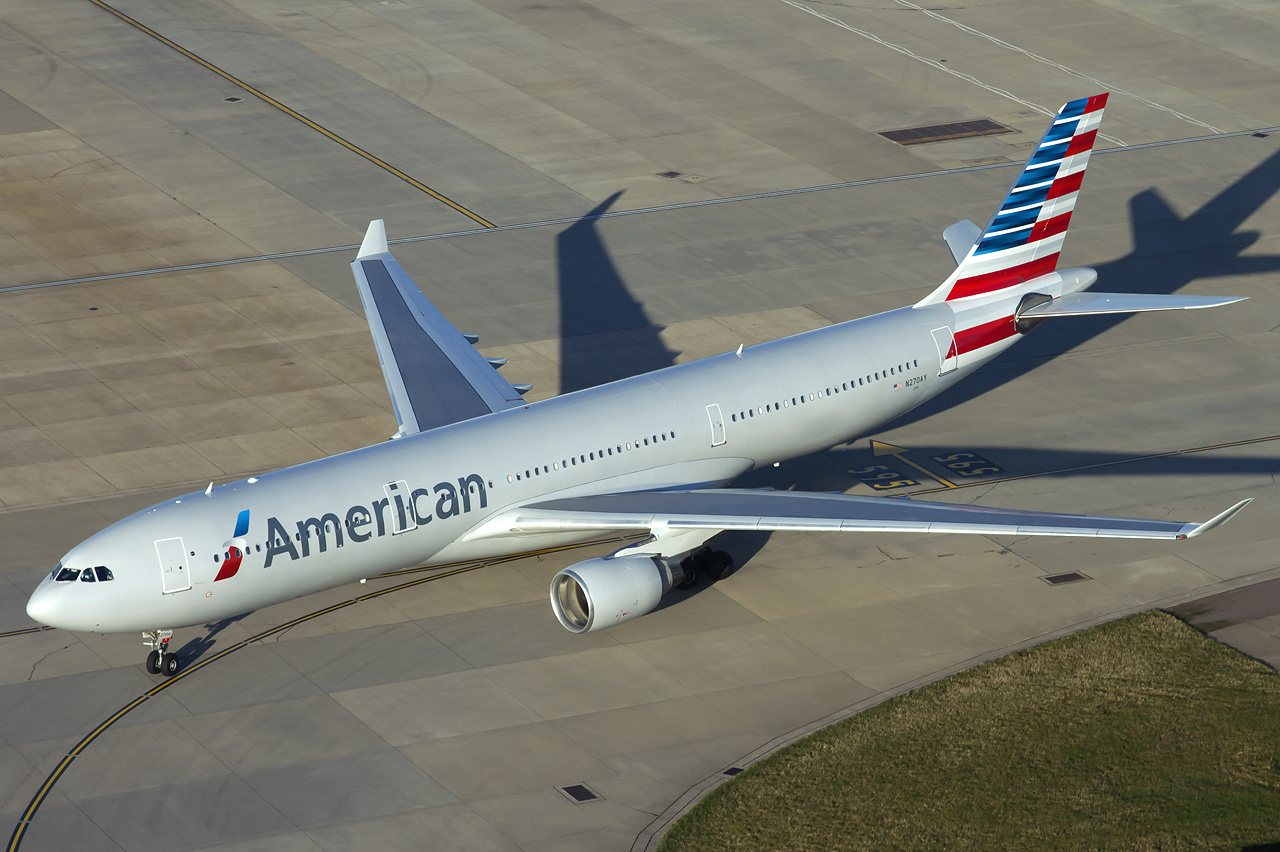
American Airlines (Ex-US Airways N270AY) Airbus A330-300 at London Heathrow Airport in November 2014.

The United States Department of Justice, along with attorneys general from six states and the District of Columbia, filed a lawsuit in August 2013 seeking to block the merger, arguing that it would mean less competition and higher prices. Both American Airlines and US Airways said that they would fight the lawsuit and continue with their merger after regulatory approval. On November 12, the airlines reached a settlement with the U.S. Justice Department and several state attorneys general to settle the lawsuit and allow the merger to be finalized. Terms of the settlement included the divestitures of slot pairs, gates and services at Washington Reagan National Airport and Laguardia Airport to low-cost carriers, as well as the divestment of two gates each from the following airports: Boston Logan, Chicago O'Hare, Dallas Love, Los Angeles and Miami. The new American also agreed to maintain operations at historical levels at its hubs in Charlotte, Chicago O'Hare, Los Angeles, Miami, New York Kennedy, Philadelphia, and Phoenix for a period of three years. AMR and US Airways Group completed the merger on December 9, 2013, in the process creating the new holding company American Airlines Group, Inc., which began trading on NASDAQ later that day.

An antitrust suit, filed by a group of 40 passengers and travel agents, also sought to block the merger. However, American's bankruptcy court judge refused to enjoin the two airlines from merging, saying that the group did not demonstrate that the merger would irreparably harm them. The plaintiffs' lawyer appealed and was turned down at the U.S. District Court level and was further rebuffed at the Supreme Court after his stay request was denied by Justice Ruth Bader Ginsburg.

On April 8, 2015, the Federal Aviation Administration awarded American Airlines and US Airways a single operating certificate.

The US Airways brand was discontinued on October 17, 2015, with all flights rebranded as "American Airlines". However, the mainline fleet aircraft were not fully converted to the American Airlines livery until November 2016, with regional fleet aircraft following suit by May 2017.

=== Recent changes to intercontinental routes ===
Since 2018, American Airlines has made significant changes to its overseas international network. These include the elimination of Asian routes and expansion of the European footprint at its Chicago hub, the experimentation of new transatlantic routes at the Philadelphia hub, and the expansions of service to Haneda Airport in Tokyo.

In the fall of 2018, American cut its routes out of Chicago to Shanghai and Beijing because they were never profitable in a time of high oil prices. Prior to these cuts, American had stopped flying from Chicago to Nagoya and Delhi in 2005 and 2014 respectively for similar reasons. American also reduced the frequency of its Chicago to Tokyo route from daily to three-times weekly before announcing the cancellation of the route to take effect in the spring of 2020. American also added routes from Chicago to Venice and Athens during the summers of 2018 and 2019; both destinations were already operating successfully out of the Philadelphia hub.

American also began adding new transatlantic routes out of its Philadelphia hub while cutting back transatlantic operations at JFK Airport in New York, thus de-emphasizing the JFK hub from August 2017 until April 2019, when all their wide-body long-haul flights were upgraded to the Boeing 777, allowing them to offer Premium Economy fares on all long-haul flights from the New York hub in a first attempt to complement the Philadelphia hub. However, starting in April 2021, due to its partnership with JetBlue, it reestablished JFK as a major international and domestic hub, once again adding flights from the JFK hub to transatlantic destinations including Tel Aviv, Athens, New Delhi And Doha among an array of many international routes as well as adding domestic routes to Fort Lauderdale, Jackson Hole and Santa Ana among varieties of new domestic routes from the JFK hub. In the summer of 2018, American began flying nonstop from its Philadelphia hub to Budapest and Prague, while in 2019 new service out of Philadelphia with the Boeing 767 aircraft began to Berlin, Bologna, and Dubrovnik in addition to a new route to Edinburgh operated by Boeing 757 aircraft. All of these routes were subsequently cancelled, although American resumed flights to Edinburgh in May 2025.

The airline has also added new transatlantic flights from hubs outside Chicago and Philadelphia routes from Charlotte to Munich, flights to Dublin and Munich from the Dallas/Fort Worth hub, and a new Phoenix to London route in 2019. American also resumed service to Tel Aviv in 2021 after a six-year hiatus.

In the spring of 2020, after gaining additional slots at Haneda Airport in Tokyo, American shifted all of its Los Angeles-Tokyo flights from Narita Airport to Haneda, while one daily flight from Tokyo to Dallas/Fort Worth was shifted from Narita to Haneda.

=== Post-merger issues & COVID-19 impact ===
Following its merger with US Airways in 2013, American Airlines underperformed its rivals operationally and financially. While the integration of the two carriers went more smoothly than that of other carriers, American as of 2021 ranks relatively poorly in several quality rankings and is the most-indebted major US airline, due in part to its spending on stock buybacks. In summer 2019, American Airlines suffered significant service disruptions, due in part to the grounding of the 737 MAX, labor disputes, and poor weather.

Maintenance workers approved a new union contract in March 2020, finally consolidating all of American's workers under unified contracts; for years following the merger, legacy US Airways and legacy American workers had separate contracts.

In May 2020, American announced that the company would cut 30% of its management and administrative staff due to falling revenues during the COVID-19 pandemic. In October 2020, following the failure of Congress to extend the Payroll Support Program, the airline furloughed 19,000 employees. Upon the passage of an extension, the workers were reinstated. American Airlines also retired over 100 aircraft, including its E190, A330, 757, 767 and CRJ200 fleets. As a result, it now has the youngest fleet of the legacy carriers. In 2020, the company reported a loss of $8.9 billion, its biggest ever.

== 2020s ==
In February 2021, American announced 13,000 workers would be furloughed in April if the Payroll Support Program was not extended again; following the passage of the American Rescue Plan, the furloughs were canceled.

December 7, 2021, American Airlines Group announced Doug Parker will be retiring as the chief executive officer on March 31, 2022 while he will continue to be the chairman of American's board. Robert Isom, the current president of American will be the new CEO.

On February 28, 2022 in response to the Russian invasion of Ukraine, American indefinitely suspended its interline agreements with Russian airlines Aeroflot and S7, including its oneworld frequent flier program with S7.

A mid-2020 partnership with JetBlue called the Northeast Alliance, included coordinating direct flights for Boston and New York City. This resulted in a Justice Department anti-trust lawsuit. On May 19, 2023, judge Leo Sorokin ruled that the alliance hindered consumers as it reduced competition and must be disbanded. as of July 2023, American Airlines is working to appeal the ruling.

In September 2024, American Airlines flight attendants ratified a new five year contract, averting the threat of a labor strike.

In October 2024, American announced new technology at boarding that will reject passengers trying to "gate-jump," or board before their gate is called. After testing the technology at four airports, it announced it would get a wider rollout starting in November 2024.

On January 29, 2025, American Eagle flight 5342 collided with a Black Hawk helicopter, resulting in both crashing into the Potomac River near Ronald Reagan Washington National Airport.

In July 2026, American Airlines CEO Robert Isom announced a strategic initiative aimed at closing a $3 billion profit gap with United Airlines by focusing on premium passenger growth, cabin upgrades, and expanded lounge facilities. Despite anticipated fuel cost increases, the airline projected a nearly 80% rise in adjusted earnings for the fiscal year.

== Former hubs ==
- Nashville – American opened a hub at Nashville in 1986. It was closed in 1995 after it was deemed not profitable.
- Raleigh/Durham – American opened a hub at Raleigh/Durham in 1987. It was closed 1995 after it was deemed not profitable.
- San Jose (CA) – American began its San Jose hub on December 2, 1988, soon after American acquired Air California. In 1993, American downsized the hub and subleased several gates to Reno Air. Reno Air developed San Jose into a hub in the mid-1990s; American went on to acquire Reno Air through a tender offer in December 1998, and fully integrated Reno Air operations in September 1999. However, American ultimately lost money on the acquisition and wound up most of its West Coast flying within the next few years.
- San Juan – American opened its San Juan hub in 1986 and closed it in 2012. American used San Juan as a connection point for Caribbean destinations using ATR 72 commuter aircraft. American has since removed the ATR 72 series aircraft from its regional fleet and closed its hub at San Juan.
- St. Louis – American closed its St. Louis hub in 2009 because of the declining need for a second Midwestern hub. The St. Louis hub was inherited from Trans World Airlines.
