= Free travel pass =

Free public transport privilege

A free travel pass is the privilege of a certain class of passengers to use a public transport service without paying a fare or presenting a ticket. They may need to present an identification card produced by their employer or other sponsoring organization, or by the transit provider.

== Types of passenger ==
The following types of passenger sometimes receive free travel on transport services:

- Students (e.g. U-Pass)
- The elderly
- The disabled
- Low Income and/or public benefit recipient
- Children under 18 or 20 years old
- System employees and their dependents
- Public safety workers and military personnel

== Funding ==
Free travel for various types of passenger may be funded by:

- national, regional or local governments, through taxation
- cross subsidy from other passengers
- employers for their staff
- schools or universities, through their students' fees or education funding

== List of examples ==
- Australia
  - Canberra, Australia - Free public transport for everyone 75 years and over.
  - Victoria, Australia - The Myki Access Travel Pass is a free Travel Pass for people with a significant permanent disability who travel independently on Victoria's public transport network.
- Canada
  - Kingston, Ontario - all children 14 and under (no pass required), all high school students attending a high school in the City of Kingston (pass required), all recipients of Ontario Works benefits (pass required), companions assisting a person with a disability (application and pass required)
- Taiwan
  - Taichung
    - The city offered free bus travel for trips under 10 km by paying with an electronic card, and fare cap of NT$10 for longer journeys. However, since ROC 110 (2021), the concession is only available with a named resident-only card, making free travel only available to local residents, and the basic fare has become NT$15 (NT$5 discount from cash fare NT$20) by paying with a non-resident card.
  - Taiwan
    - Many community bus routes are free of charge.
- United Kingdom
  - England
    - In Manchester, The Oxford Road Link (Bus route 147) offers free travel for part of the route (between Manchester University and MMU campuses) for university students and staff. Three free bus routes also operate in Manchester city Centre.
    - England-wide travel provided by the DfT for over-60s and eligible disabled people between 09:30-23:00 weekdays and all day weekends under the English National Concessionary Bus Travel Scheme. Similar schemes operate in Scotland (see below) and Wales; however there is no unified scheme covering the whole of Great Britain and national concessionary passes are valid for use only by residents of each of the three countries and only within each country.
  - Scotland
    - The Scottish National Entitlement Card offers free bus and scheduled coach travel throughout Scotland for under 22s, disabled and elderly passengers.
- Republic of Ireland
  - Free travel for all persons over the age of 66. Many people with disabilities and their carers are also eligible for free travel passes. Free travel can also be extended to Northern Ireland (part of the United Kingdom) with a separate document, the Senior Smart Pass. In total, nearly 1 million people (out of a population of 5 million) have free travel.
- United States
  - Lancaster, California - passengers of Antelope Valley Transit Authority who are disabled, senior citizens, active military, and veterans, all ride free on all local fixed route buses (with id)
  - San Diego, California - employees of the Metropolitan Transit System ride free on all scheduled routes (with ID).
  - Washington, D.C. - The Washington Metropolitan Area Transit Authority (WMATA) has a service for disabled people and persons unable to use public transit, called MetroAccess, which allows Metro Access card holders to use Metrobus and Metrorail trains without paying. This is also available for services provided by WMATA in Maryland and Virginia.
  - Montgomery and Prince George's County, Maryland - In addition to WMATA mentioned above, Ride On in Montgomery, and TheBus in Prince George's offer free bus trips for elderly and disabled passengers (including disabled who do not have Metro Access cards.)
- Zagreb, Croatia - Free public transport for all students, unemployed persons, disabled persons (more than 70%), blood donors and everyone over 75 years
- Other major cities of former Yugoslavia (Belgrade, Niš, Osijek, Split, etc.) - free use of buses and trams for everybody over 80 (in some cities 100) years
- American Airlines used to sell lifetime passes for unlimited first class tickets on all of its flights under the brand AAirpass. The offer was discontinued after it had been found to cause substantial losses to the company.

== See also ==
- Zero-fare public transport
