= Graphite (disambiguation) =

Graphite is one of the allotropes of carbon.

Graphite may also refer to:

- Carbon fiber reinforced polymer
- Graphite (album), an album by Closterkeller
- Graphite Capital, a financial services company based in London
- Graphite, Ontario, a community in Canada
- Graphite (smart font technology), a font rendering system developed by SIL International
- Graphite (software), an open source monitoring tool
- Graphite, spyware developed by the Israeli company Paragon Solutions
- Nuclear graphite, synthetic graphite used as a neutron moderator in nuclear reactors
- Graphite bomb, a weapon for disabling electrical power systems

== See also ==
- Grafite (born 1979), Brazilian former footballer
- Graphyte, American company
