= Fin de siecle (album) =

Live album by Closterkeller
- Released: February 29, 2000 (Poland)
- Recorded: October, 1999 at Program 3 Polskiego Radia studio, Warsaw
- Genre: Gothic rock
- Length: 62:14
- Label: Polskie Radio, Metal Mind Productions
- Producer: Polskie Radio, Wojciech Przybylski

Closterkeller chronology
| Graphite (1999) | Fin de siecle (2000) | Act III - Live 2003 (2003) |

Fin de siecle is the second live album by Polish gothic rock band Closterkeller. It was released on February 29, 2000 in Poland through Polskie Radio. The album was recorded in October 1999 at Program 3 Polskiego Radia studio, Warsaw. The cover art was created by Anja Orthodox and Marti Pietraszkiewicz with photos by Dariusz Kawka and Anja Orthodox.

== Track listing ==
| No. | Title | Length |
|---|---|---|
| 1. | "Powitanie" | 1:06 |
| 2. | "Czas komety" | 3:44 |
| 3. | "Desperado" | 4:32 |
| 4. | "Fortepian" | 5:40 |
| 5. | "Na krawędzi" | 4:02 |
| 6. | "Scarlet" | 4:04 |
| 7. | "Zaklęta w marmur" | 4:43 |
| 8. | "Cisza w moim domu" | 4:55 |
| 9. | "Władza" | 3:20 |
| 10. | "A nadzieja" | 4:27 |
| 11. | "Zegarmistrz światła" | 4:37 |
| 12. | "Ziemia obiecana" | 3:20 |
| 13. | "W moim kraju" | 2:49 |
| 14. | "Chat, chat" | 2:57 |
| 15. | "Zakończenie" | 1:26 |
| 16. | "Walet Pik" | 2:49 |
| 17. | "To muzyka" | 2:57 |
| 18. | "Pożegnanie" | 0:46 |

== Personnel ==
- Anja Orthodox - vocal, synthesizer, lyrics
- Marcin Płuciennik - acoustic bass, backing vocal
- Paweł Pieczyński - acoustic guitar, backing vocal
- Gerard Klawe - drums, backing vocal
- Michał Rollinger - piano, synthesizer, sampler, backing vocal
- Marcin Mentel - acoustic guitar, backing vocal

Music - Closterkeller.
Track 11 - music: T. Woźniak, lyrics: B. Chorążuk

== Music videos ==
- "Zegarmistrz światła" (2000)
- "A nadzieja" (2000)

== Release history ==
| Year | Label | Format | Country | Out of Print? | Notes |
|---|---|---|---|---|---|
| 2000 | Polskie Radio | CD | Poland | Yes | Original CD release |
| 2005 | Metal Mind Productions | CD | Poland | No | CD reissue; videoclip |
