= QBA (disambiguation) =

QbA is a German wine classification.

QBA or Qba may also refer to:

- Quebecair (IATA code), a former airline
- Robert "Qba" Kubajek, drummer in the Polish rock group Closterkeller

== See also ==
- WQBA, a radio station in Miami, Florida, US
