= Auric =

Auric may refer to:

- An ion of gold, Au^{3+}
- Aurangabad Industrial City (abbrev. AURIC), an industrial city in Maharashtra, India
- Auric, the currency of the fictional state of the Draka in The Domination series
- Auric Air, airline of Tanzania
- Auric Fires, 1997 studio album by Benestrophe
- Auric Godshawk, a character in Fever Crumb
- Auric Goldfinger, a villain from the James Bond film Goldfinger
- Auric the Conqueror, an ally of the Zeo Rangers
- Georges Auric (1899–1983), French composer
- Auric, a fictional mutant character from Marvel Comics

== See also ==
- Aura (disambiguation)
- Aurum (disambiguation)
