= Aurum =

Aurum may refer to:

- Aurum, the Latin word for gold and the source of its chemical symbol, "Au"
- Aurum bikes, a Spanish bicycle manufacturer
- Aurum (liqueur), an Italian liqueur
- Aurum Geyser, in the Upper Geyser Basin of Yellowstone
- Aurum, Nevada, a ghost town
- Aurum Press, a defunct English publishing house, now part of The Quarto Group
- Aurum (album), an album by Closterkeller
- Aurum, an alien race in the video game Kid Icarus: Uprising

== See also ==
- AURYN, a symbol in The Neverending Story film
