= Aurum (album) =

Studio album by Closterkeller
- Released: October 2, 2009 (Poland)
- Recorded: June 23–September 10, 2009 at Izabelin Studio, Izabelin
- Genre: Gothic rock
- Length: 76:40
- Language: Polish
- Label: Universal Music Polska
- Producers: Piotr Zygo, Andrzej Puczyński

Closterkeller chronology
Nero (2003)	Aurum (2009)

Aurum is the eight studio album by Polish gothic rock band Closterkeller. It was released on October 2, 2009 in Poland through Universal Music Polska. The album was recorded on June 23–September 10, 2009 at Izabelin Studio, Izabelin. The cover art was created by Albert Bonarski and fotos by Wojciech Wojtczak.

== Track listing ==
All tracks by Anja Orthodox

No.	Title	Length
1.	"Ogród półcieni"	6:00
2.	"Złoty"	6:26
3.	"Nocarz"	6:06
4.	"Vendetta"	5:00
5.	"Na nic to"	6:49
6.	"12 dni"	4:09
7.	"Déjà vu"	4:58
8.	"Nie tylko gra [Soulflies Team]"	5:01
9.	"Między piekłem a niebem"	7:01
10.	"I skończona bajka"	5:25
11.	"Matka"	7:07
12.	"Dwie połowy"	7:32
13.	"Królewna z czekolady"	5:03

== Personnel ==
- Anja Orthodox - vocal
- Mariusz Kumala - guitar
- Krzysztof Najman - bass
- Janusz Jastrzębowski - drums
- Michał Rollinger - keyboards

== Release history ==
Year	Label	Format	Country	Out of Print?	Notes
2009	Universal Music Polska	CD	Poland	No	Original CD release

== Charts ==
Chart	Country	Peak position
OLiS	Poland	15
