= Leading Edge Aviation Services =

American aviation services company

Leading Edge Aviation Services, Inc.
- Company type: Private
- Industry: Aviation Services
- Founded: 1989
- Headquarters: Costa Mesa, California, US
- Key people: Mike Manclark; Chairman and Founder; Chris Harano; President & Chief Executive Officer; Dave Patterson; Executive Vice President, Sales and Marketing; Rod Friese; Chief Operating Officer; Dan Zeddy; Chief Financial Officer
- Website: leadingedgecorp.com

Leading Edge Aviation Services (now renamed International Aerospace Coatings) is an FAA-certified maintenance, repair and overhaul (MRO) company based in Costa Mesa, California. Leading Edge has painted aircraft for airlines such as United, Continental, Delta, Northwest, Air Canada, Virgin America, US Airways, UPS, and The Blue Angels, as well as for the 1997 movie Air Force One. The company is the largest independent painter of commercial and military aircraft, with an annual revenue of $150 million in the United States, with facilities in California, Mississippi, Texas, Florida and South Carolina.

== History ==
Leading Edge was founded by Mike Manclark in 1989 as an aircraft detailing business based in John Wayne International Airport in Orange County, California. The company expanded through the 1990s, with Manclark becoming a private jet detailer for celebrities such as Bob Hope and Frank Sinatra. After a contract with McDonnell Douglas for a KC110 heavy-check maintenance clean, the company began to work on large aircraft, first stripping paint for maintenance purposes, then contracting paint jobs. The company's first high-profile job was to design United Airlines' new brand image, to be released at the Super Bowl. The company gained contracts with major airlines such as Delta and Continental, as well as for special projects such as the Arizona Diamondbacks-themed Boeing 757 for America West Airlines, historical restorations, and Mitt Romney's 2012 campaign plane.

Other notable milestones:

In 2008, The company repainted a World War II era Douglas A-26 Invader, now on display at the Orange County John Wayne Airport.

In 2009, restored a Blue Angels McDonnell Douglas F/A-18 Hornet, now on display at the San Diego Air and Space Museum.

In 2010, was contracted to repaint 631 planes in the United and Continental Airlines merger, expanding the company's Amarillo, Texas location.

In 2012, received AS9100 certification. The same year, the company painted the first Boeing 787 Dreamliner, for Air India, and were contracted to paint all 787s built in Charleston, SC.

Vance Street Capital LLC made a private equity investment in Leading Edge in 2012.

Leading Edge began repainting American Airlines' fleet of aircraft when the company changed its "AA" logo to a stylized American flag in 2013.

In 2016, Leading Edge, Associated Painter, and Eirtech Aviation merged into 1 brand - International Aerospace Coatings, Inc. (IAC).

== Awards ==
Orange County Business Journal's 2012 Excellence in Entrepreneurship Award (Mike Manclark)

Aviation Week and Overhaul & Maintenance 2012 MRO of the Year Award for Innovative Service Supplier
