= Violet (Closterkeller album) =

Studio album by Closterkeller
- Released: September 1993 (CC); December 6, 1993 (CD) (Poland)
- Recorded: April–September 1993 at Izabelin Studio, Izabelin
- Genre: Gothic rock
- Length: 67:58 (CD)
- Label: Izabelin Studio, Metal Mind Productions
- Producer: Andrzej Puczyński

Closterkeller chronology
| Blue (1992) | Violet (1993) | Scarlet (1995) |

Violet is the third studio album by Polish gothic rock band Closterkeller. It was released in September 1993 in Poland through Izabelin Studio. The album was recorded at Izabelin Studio from April to September, 1993. The cover art was created by Marta Dziubalska and Łukasz Dziubalski.

== Track listing ==
| No. | Title | Length |
|---|---|---|
| 1. | "To on - znowu następny" | 4:45 |
| 2. | "W moim kraju" | 4:27 |
| 3. | "To muzyka" | 4:22 |
| 4. | "Babeluu" | 4:34 |
| 5. | "Walet Pik" | 2:57 |
| 6. | "Salome" | 3:36 |
| 7. | "Kolana i już" | 2:27 |
| 8. | "Agnieszka" | 5:16 |
| 9. | "A nadzieja" | 4:34 |
| 10. | "Supernova" | 3:27 |
| 11. | "Jihad" | 3:17 |
| 12. | "Video-film" | 3:03 |
| 13. | "Dwa oblicza Ewy" | 3:50 |
| 14. | "Violette" | 5:54 |

=== Bonus Tracks ===
| No. | Title | Length |
|---|---|---|
| 15. | "Kołysanka dla Adasia" | 1:55 |
| 16. | "Hassan i Sabbah" | 3:50 |
| 17. | "Noc w haremie" | 5:20 |

== Personnel ==
- Anja Orthodox - vocal, lyrics
- Paweł Pieczyński - guitar
- Krzysztof Najman - bass
- Piotr Pawłowski - drums
- Michał Rollinger - keyboards
- Zbigniew Bieniak - backing vocals
- Violetta "Fiolka" Najdenowicz - backing vocals

Music - Closterkeller.

== Music videos ==
- "Agnieszka" (1993)
- "W moim kraju" (1993)
- "Babeluu" (1994)
- "Supernova" (1994)

== Release history ==
| Year | Label | Format | Country | Out of Print? | Notes |
|---|---|---|---|---|---|
| 1993 | Izabelin Studio | CC | Poland | Yes | Original CC release |
| 1993 | Metal Mind Productions | CD | Poland | Yes | CD reissue; bonus tracks; different track list |
| 1999 | Metal Mind Productions | CD | Poland | Yes | CD reissue; videoclips; remastered |
| 2001 | Metal Mind Productions | CD | Poland | Yes | Box with Scarlet album |
