= Scarlet (Closterkeller album) =

Studio album by Closterkeller
- Released: January 16, 1995 (Poland)
- Recorded: August–October, 1994 at Izabelin Studio, Izabelin
- Genre: Gothic rock, gothic metal
- Length: 68:30
- Language: Polish, English, French
- Label: Izabelin Studio/PolyGram Polska, Metal Mind Productions
- Producer: Jarosław Pruszkowski

Closterkeller chronology
Violet (1993)	Scarlet (1995)	Cyan (1996)

Singles from Scarlet
- 1. "Scarlett" Released: 1994

Scarlet is the fourth studio album by Polish gothic rock band Closterkeller. It was released on January 16, 1995 in Poland through Izabelin Studio/PolyGram Polska. The album was recorded at Izabelin Studio from August to October, 1994. The cover art was created by Piotr Rosiński and fotos by Paulina Ochnio and Piotr Rosiński.

The album has reached a golden record status in Poland, with over 100 thousands copies sold.

== Track listing ==
No.	Title	Length
1.	"Dlaczego noszę broń"	5:01
2.	"California"	4:31
3.	"Tak się boję bólu"	3:43
4.	"Scarlett"	4:05
5.	"Śniło"	4:18
6.	"Phantom"	3:35
7.	"Owoce wschodu"	4:13
8.	"Coś"	2:20
9.	"Po to właśnie"	3:53
10.	"Temple of time"	3:34
11.	"Tak rodzi się nienawiść"	3:43
12.	"Brylant"	3:55
13.	"Dla Jej siostry"	5:00
14.	"A ona, ona"	7:13
15.	"Mogę tylko patrzeć"	3:53
16.	"Tak się boję bólu (przedmix)"	3:40
17.	"Chat"	3:40

== Personnel ==
- Anja Orthodox - vocal, lyrics
- Paweł Pieczyński - guitar
- Krzysztof Najman - bass
- Piotr Pawłowski - drums
- Michał Rollinger - keyboards
- Michał Jelonek - violin
- Tomasz "Titus" Pukacki - vocal
- Jacek Skirucha - guitar
- Dariusz Ślusarczyk - conga

Music - Closterkeller.
Track 9 lyrics - Cyprian Kamil Norwid and Tadeusz Gierkowski.

== Music videos ==
- "Scarlett" (1995)
- "Owoce wschodu" (1995)
- "Dlaczego noszę broń" (1994)

== Release history ==
Year	Label	Format	Country	Out of Print?	Notes
1995	Izabelin Studio/PolyGram Polska	CD/CC	Poland	Yes	Original CD and CC release
1999	Metal Mind Productions	CD	Poland	Yes	CD reissue; videoclips; remastered
2001	Metal Mind Productions	CD	Poland	Yes	Box with Violet album
2015	Universal Music Polska	CD	Poland	No	Remastered version. Contains a second CD with live version.
