= AAirpass =

Airline discount program

Sample lifetime AAirpass card

AAirpass (pronounced Airpass) was a membership-based discount program offered by American Airlines to frequent flyers launched in 1981. The program offered pass holders free flights and unlimited access to Admirals Club locations for either five years or life. After the lifetime and unlimited travel AAirpass program was discontinued, American Airlines offered a different product under a similar name, which instead focused on prepaid fares at a fixed price for frequent business travelers, with an annual minimum commitment per traveller. American Airlines stopped offering this version of Airpass on November 30, 2022, and intended to fully unwind the program by March 31, 2024. Existing unlimited AAirpass memberships remain valid.

== Program ==
The program (now re-branded as AirPass) initially enabled passholders unlimited first class travel on any of the airline's flights worldwide. Lifetime membership was priced at $250,000, with the option to purchase a companion pass for an additional $150,000. A total of 66 AAirpasses are reported to have been sold under the unlimited travel conditions, with businessmen Michael Dell, Mark Cuban, baseball player Willie Mays, and America's Cup-winner Dennis Conner among those who purchased the passes. The program was launched at a time when the airline was struggling financially and in need of a quick infusion of cash.

The cost of the pass was $250,000 when launched in 1981 (equivalent to $885,000 in 2025), this increased to $600,000 in 1990 (equivalent to $1,500,000 in 2025), and $1.01 million in 1993 (equivalent to $2.25 million in 2025). The airline ended sales of the unlimited passes in 1994 except for a one-time offer in the 2004 Neiman Marcus Christmas catalog at a price of $3 million (equivalent to $5 million in 2025) for the pass and $2 million (equivalent to $3.4 million in 2025) for a companion pass; none were sold.

== Profitability investigations ==
In 2007, during a period of financial instability for the airline, American Airlines assigned a "revenue integrity unit" to investigate AAirpass holders. The airline's investigators concluded that two AAirpass holders, Steven Rothstein and Jacques Vroom, were costing the airline more than $1 million annually. The airline points to accumulation of air miles for flights which they received for free under the AAirpass, allowing some passengers to accumulate tens of millions of miles as well as taxes and airport fees paid for by the airline. The program has been called "a huge disaster" for the company. The two AAirpass holders including their companion passes were terminated from the program when the airline accused them of fraudulent activity.

=== Pass terminations ===
Steven Rothstein, a financier from Chicago, upgraded to a lifetime AAirpass for $233,509.93 on October 1, 1987, after a discount of $16,490.07 for the value of mileage on a previous AAirpass. He added a $150,000 companion pass two years later. Rothstein negotiated additions to the contract, including a provision for his companion to fly on flights immediately before or after his flight. Then American Airlines CEO Robert Crandall wrote Rothstein a letter on January 13, 1998, saying, "I am delighted that you’ve enjoyed your AAirpass investment – you can count on us to keep the Company solid, and to honor the deal, far into the future." On December 13, 2008, Rothstein checked in at Chicago O'Hare International Airport with a friend for a flight to Bosnia. A letter from the airline was hand-delivered to him at the airport informing him that the pass had been terminated due to fraudulent behavior, specifically his history of approaching passengers at the gate and offering them travel on his companion seat and for using the companion program to purchase an adjacent empty seat under a fake name to keep them vacant, which was often used for privacy or extra carry-on luggage. Rothstein sued American Airlines in the United States District Court for the Northern District of Illinois, arguing that "American waived its rights to enforce the contract by not cracking down on Rothstein sooner," according to District Court Judge Virginia Mary Kendall, who denied Rothstein's motion in 2011. Litigation was delayed due to the airline's filing for Chapter 11 bankruptcy. By the end of 2012, the two parties appear to have settled their case out of court, with Rothstein's appeal dismissed and the airline's counterclaims dismissed with prejudice.

Jacques E. Vroom Jr., a Dallas-based marketing executive, paid $356,000 for his unlimited AAirpass and companion pass on December 28, 1989, traveling nearly 38 million miles. A letter was hand-delivered to Vroom by airline security personnel on July 30, 2008, during check-in at London Heathrow Airport, informing him that his passes had been terminated for fraudulent activity. The airline sued Vroom in 2011, accusing him of selling his companion seat, a violation of the American Airlines 1994 Tariff Rule 744. Vroom countersued, arguing that the rule went into effect after purchase of the lifetime pass and accusing the airline of slander; American Airlines then filed for bankruptcy and, as of late 2024, the claims have not been resolved.
