= American Airlines =

Airline of the United States

American Airlines, Inc.

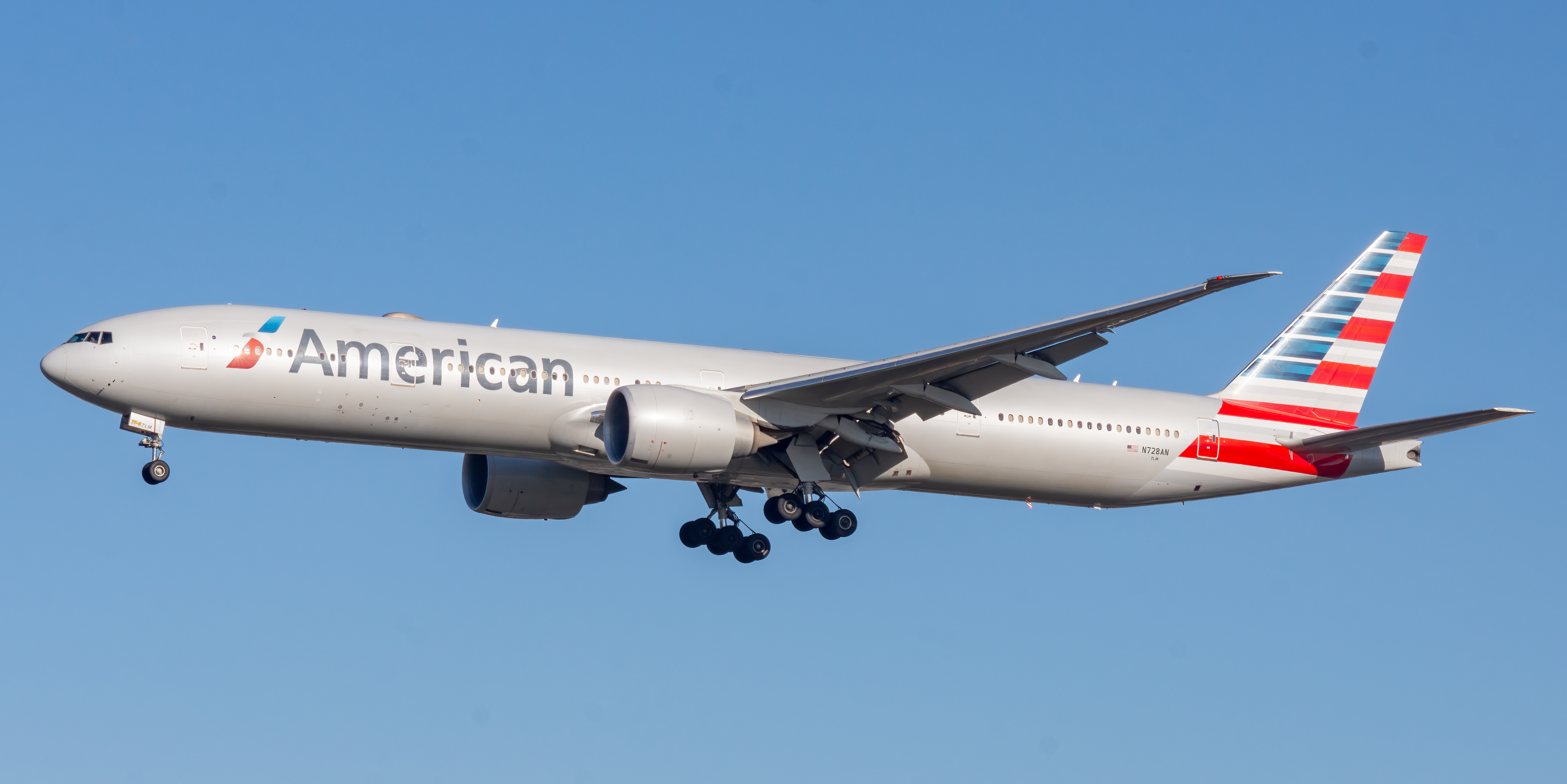
- American Airlines Boeing 777-300ER
IATA	ICAO	Call sign
AA	AAL	AMERICAN
- Founded: 1930; 96 years ago (as a union of more than 80 airlines)
- Commenced operations: June 25, 1936; 90 years ago
- AOC #: AALA025A
- Hubs: Charlotte; Chicago–O'Hare; Dallas/Fort Worth; Los Angeles; Miami; New York–JFK; New York–LaGuardia; Philadelphia; Phoenix–Sky Harbor; Washington–National
- Frequent-flyer program: AAdvantage
- Alliance: Oneworld
- Destinations: 353
- Parent company: American Airlines Group
- Headquarters: Fort Worth, Texas, U.S.
- Key people: Robert Isom (CEO); Greg Smith (chairman)
- Revenue: ▲US$49.6 billion (2024)
- Operating income: ▼US$2.6 billion (2024)
- Net income: ▲US$0.8 billion (2024)
- Total assets: ▼US$61.8 billion (2024)
- Total equity: ▲US$−5.0 billion (2024)
- Employees: 103,440 (2024)
- Website: www.aa.com

American Airlines, Inc. is a major airline in the United States headquartered in Fort Worth, Texas, within the Dallas–Fort Worth metroplex. It is the largest airline in the world in terms of passengers carried and daily flights. American, along with its regional subsidiaries and contractors operating under the brand name American Eagle, operates an extensive international and domestic network with almost 6,800 flights per day to nearly 350 destinations in 48 countries. The airline is also a founding member of Oneworld alliance, one of the world's three major airline alliances.

American Airlines and American Eagle operate out of ten hubs, anchored by Dallas Fort Worth International Airport (DFW), the airline's largest. Charlotte Douglas International Airport (CLT) follows as the second-largest hub, serving as a primary gateway for Southeast and transatlantic travel. Miami International Airport (MIA) and Philadelphia International Airport (PHL) share the third-place spot, each serving a distinct strategic role: Philadelphia acts as the premier connection point for flights between the western U.S. and Europe, while Miami remains the leading hub for travel to the Caribbean, South America, and Latin America. The airline serves more than 200 million passengers annually and averages more than 500,000 daily. As of 2025, the company employs approximately 139,100 full-time equivalent staff members.

== History ==
DC-3 "Flagship" American's chief aircraft type during the World War II period

The earliest predecessor company of American Airlines to commence operations was Robertson Aircraft Corporation, which began mail flights on April 15, 1926.

American Airlines was established in 1930 through the union of more than eighty small airlines. The two primary organizations from which American Airlines originated were Robertson Aircraft Corporation and Colonial Air Transport. The former was first created in Missouri in 1921, with both being merged in 1929 into holding company The Aviation Corporation. This, in turn, was made in 1930 into an operating company and rebranded as American Airways. In 1934, when new laws and attrition of mail contracts forced many airlines to reorganize, the corporation redid its routes into a connected system and was renamed American Airlines. The airline fully developed its international business between 1970 and 2000. It purchased Trans World Airlines in 2001.

American Airlines played a direct role in developing the Douglas DC-3, which grew out of a marathon telephone call from American Airlines CEO C. R. Smith to Douglas Aircraft Company founder Donald Wills Douglas Sr.. During the call, Smith persuaded a reluctant Douglas to design a sleeper aircraft based on the DC-2 to replace American's Curtiss Condor II biplanes. The existing DC-2 cabin was 66 inches (1.7 m) wide, making it too narrow for side-by-side berths. Douglas agreed to proceed with development only after Smith informed him of American Airline's intention to purchase 20 aircraft.

The prototype Douglas Sleeper Transport (DST) first flew on December 17, 1935, which marked the 32nd anniversary of the Wright Brothers' flight at Kitty Hawk, North Carolina. Its cabin was 92 in (2.3 m) wide. A modified version configured with 21 seats instead of the DST's 14 to 16 sleeping berths was given the designation DC-3. There was no prototype for the DC-3; the first unit built followed seven DSTs off the production line and was delivered straight to American Airlines. American Airlines inaugurated its passenger service on June 26, 1936, with simultaneous flights departing from Newark, New Jersey, and Chicago, Illinois.

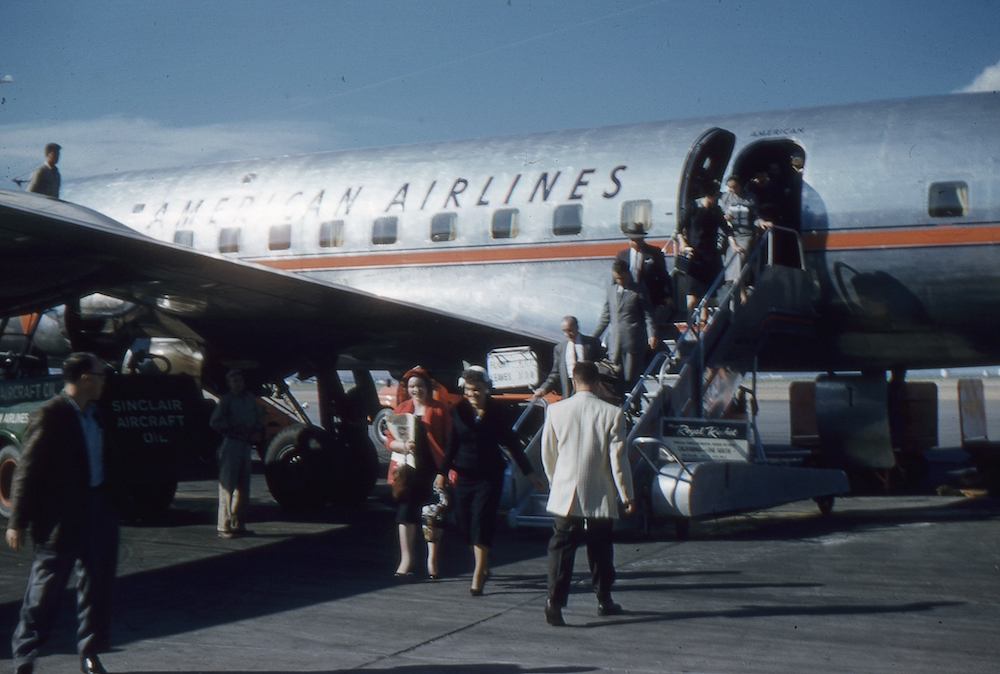
Passengers exiting plane at El Paso Airport in 1957

American also had a direct role in the development of the DC-10, which resulted from a specification from the airline to manufacturers in 1966 for a widebody aircraft smaller than the Boeing 747 but capable of flying similar long-range routes from airports with shorter runways. McDonnell Douglas responded with the DC-10 trijet shortly after the two companies' merger. On February 19, 1968, the president of American Airlines, George A. Spater, and James S. McDonnell of McDonnell Douglas announced American's intention to acquire the DC-10. American Airlines ordered 25 DC-10s in its first order. The DC-10 made its first flight on August 29, 1970, and received its type certificate from the FAA on July 29, 1971. On August 5, 1971, the DC-10 entered commercial service with American Airlines on a round-trip flight between Los Angeles and Chicago.

In 2011, due to a downturn in the airline industry, American Airlines' parent company, the AMR Corporation, filed for bankruptcy protection. In 2013, American Airlines merged with US Airways but kept the American Airlines name, as it was the more globally recognized brand. The combination of the two airlines created the largest airline in the United States, and ultimately the world.

In December 2023, the company was added to the Dow Jones Sustainability World Index, and was included for a second consecutive year in December 2024.

== Network ==
=== Hubs ===
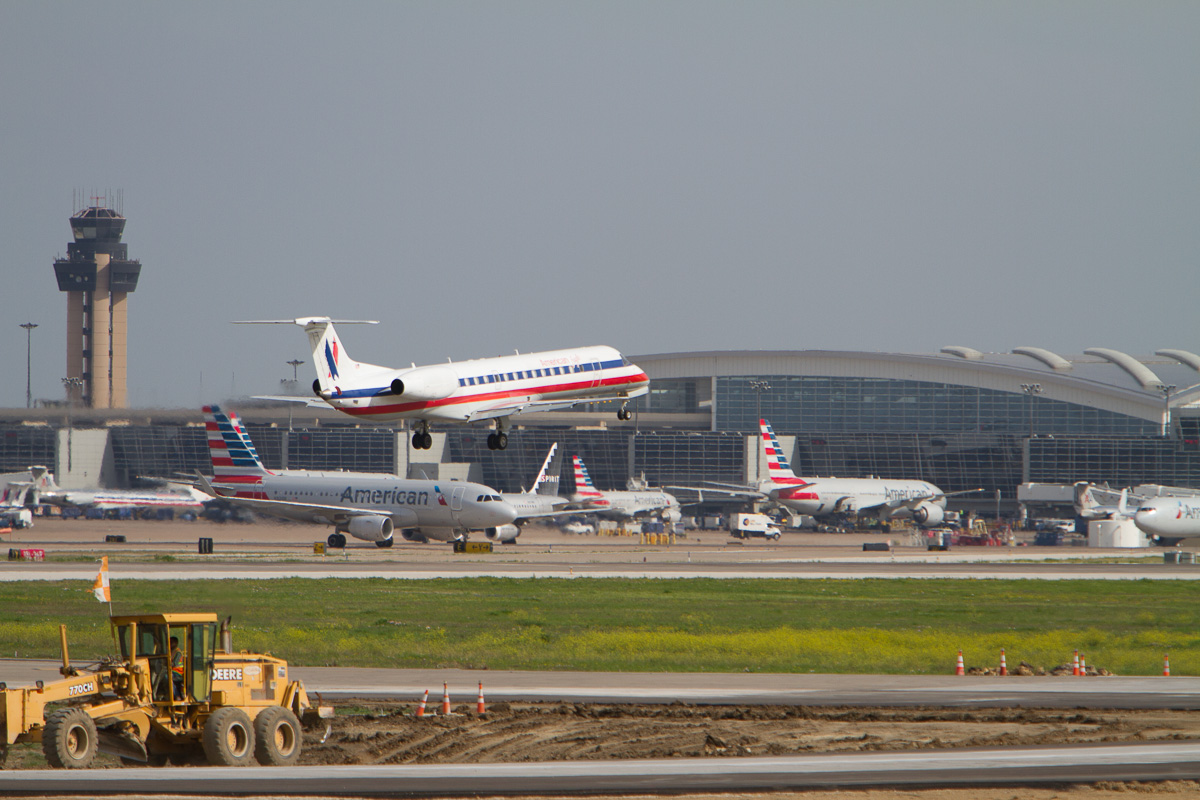
American operates its largest hub at Dallas Fort Worth International Airport.

As of May 2024 American operates ten hubs:

- Charlotte: American's hub for the southeastern United States and secondary Caribbean gateway.
- Chicago–O'Hare: American's hub for the Midwest.
- Dallas/Fort Worth: American's hub for the southern United States and largest hub overall.
- Los Angeles: American's hub for the West Coast and transpacific gateway.
- Miami: American's primary Latin American and Caribbean hub.
- New York–JFK: American's secondary transatlantic hub mainly serves destinations with high demand from local New York traffic.
- New York–LaGuardia: American's New York hub for domestic flights with a few exceptions.
- Philadelphia: American's primary transatlantic hub and Northeastern Hub.
- Phoenix–Sky Harbor: American's southwestern hub.
- Washington–National: American's hub for the capital of the United States.

=== American Eagle ===
American Eagle is the brand for regional airline flights operated for American Airlines, encompassing flights by wholly owned affiliates Envoy Air, PSA Airlines, and Piedmont Airlines, as well as third-party carriers Republic Airways and SkyWest Airlines. These regional carriers serve smaller markets, facilitating connections to American Airlines hubs, and supporting operations in mainline markets. All American Eagle carriers share similar logos, uniforms, and aircraft paint schemes as American Airlines’ mainline operations. In 2023, 46 million passengers flew on American Eagle regional flights, with about 45% connecting to or from mainline flights. These flights operate under capacity purchase agreements with both third-party and wholly owned regional carriers, controlling all aspects of marketing, scheduling, ticketing, pricing, and seat inventories. American Airlines pays fixed fees for operating specified aircraft and covering certain variable costs, such as fuel, landing fees, and insurance.

=== Alliance and codeshare agreements ===
American Airlines is a member of Oneworld alliance and have codeshares with the following airlines:

- Aer Lingus
- Air Tahiti Nui
- Alaska Airlines
- Azul Brazilian Airlines
- British Airways
- Cape Air
- Cathay Pacific
- China Southern Airlines
- Etihad Airways
- Finnair
- Fiji Airways
- Gol Linhas Aéreas Inteligentes
- Hawaiian Airlines
- Iberia
- IndiGo
- Israir
- Japan Airlines
- JetSmart
- LEVEL
- Malaysia Airlines
- Philippine Airlines
- Porter Airlines
- Qantas
- Qatar Airways
- Royal Air Maroc
- Royal Jordanian
- SriLankan Airlines
- Starlux Airlines

=== Joint ventures ===
American Airlines has established three joint ventures with fellow Oneworld alliance members, expanding beyond basic codesharing to include coordinated route planning, scheduling, and revenue sharing on jointly operated routes. The Atlantic Joint Business covers transatlantic flights with Aer Lingus, British Airways, Finnair and Iberia. The Pacific Joint Business encompasses transpacific flights with Japan Airlines. A joint venture with Qantas covers routes between the United States, Australia, and New Zealand.

Additionally, American Airlines partners with The Landline Company to provide "tarmac-to-tarmac" coach bus connections to and from two hubs: O'Hare to Rockford and South Bend; and Philadelphia to Allentown/Bethlehem, Atlantic City, Trenton–Mercer, Wilkes-Barre/Scranton, and Wilmington.

=== Interline agreements ===
American Airlines have interline agreements with the following airlines:

- My Freighter Airlines
- Singapore Airlines
- Starlux Airlines

== Fleet ==
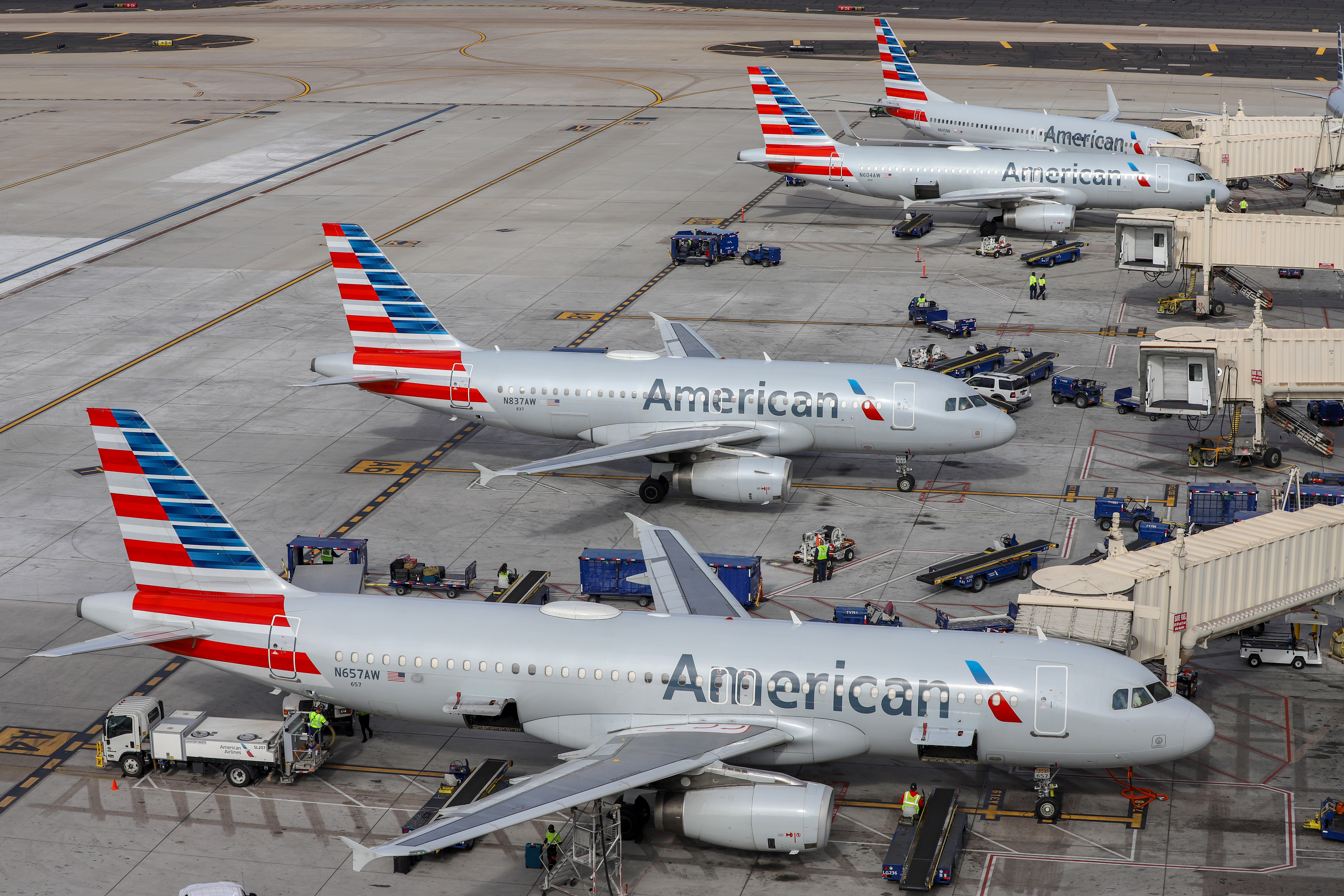
American Airlines Airbus A320 family aircraft at Phoenix Sky Harbor International Airport

As of June 2026, the American Airlines fleet consists of 1,030 mainline aircraft, making it the second largest commercial airline fleet in the world. The fleet consists of Airbus and Boeing narrow-body aircraft, and Boeing wide-body aircraft. American exclusively ordered Boeing aircraft throughout the 2000s until July 20, 2011, when American announced the largest combined aircraft order in history for 260 Airbus A320 family and 200 Boeing 737 aircraft. As of October 2025, American has 301 Airbus and Boeing aircraft on order along with 20 orders and 40 options for Boom Overture supersonic aircraft. The average age of the American mainline fleet is 14.7 years as of September 2026.

As of 2024, American Airlines has four maintenance bases: Tulsa, Pittsburgh, Dallas Fort Worth, and Charlotte Douglas airports.

== Cabins ==
Flagship First

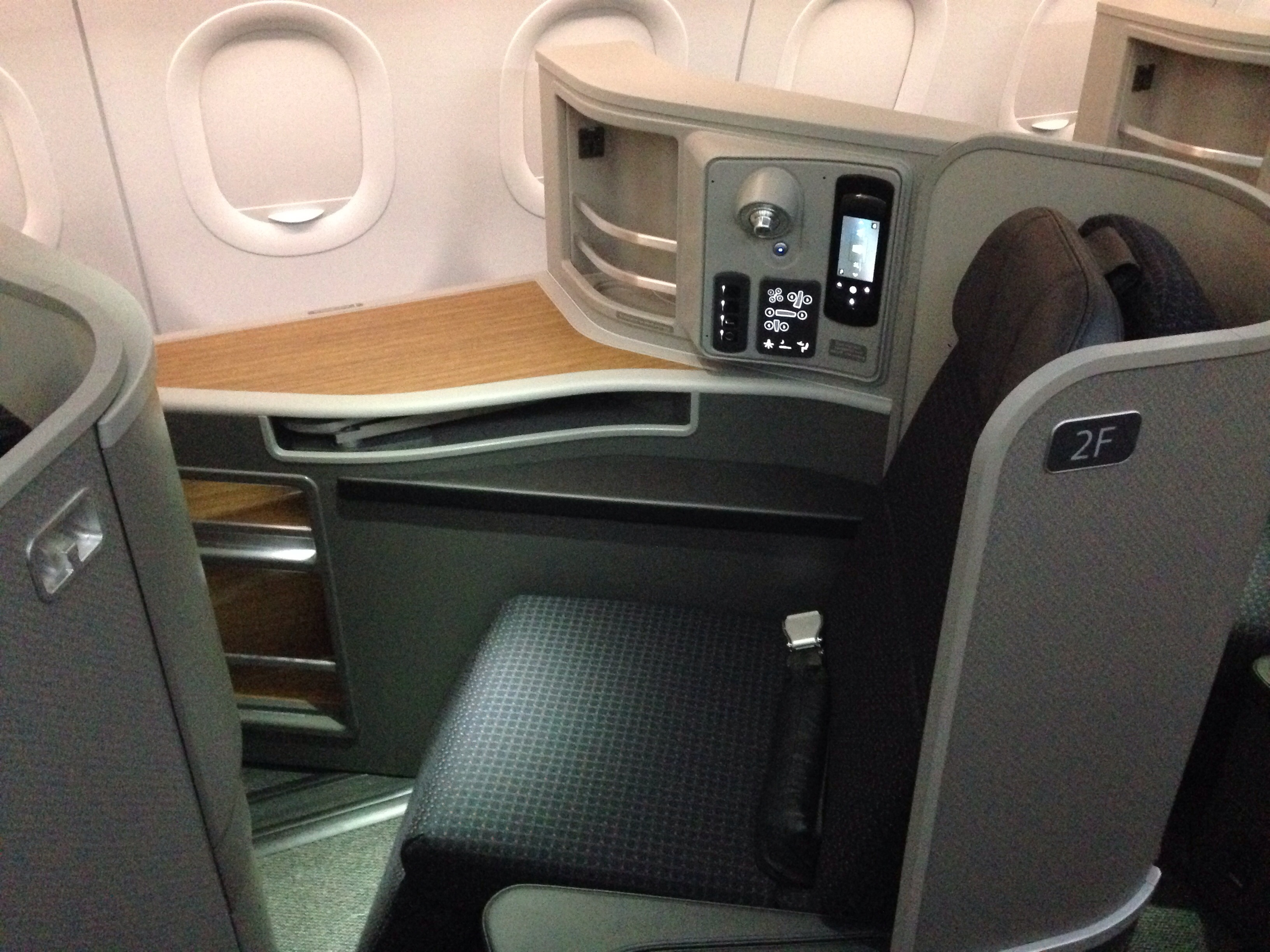
Flagship First on an Airbus A321

Flagship First is American's international and transcontinental first class product. It is offered only on Boeing 777-300ERs and select Airbus A321s, which American designates "A321T". The seats are fully lie-flat and offer direct aisle access with only one on each side of the aisle in each row. As with the airline's other premium cabins, Flagship First offers wider food and beverage options, larger seats, and lounge access at certain airports. American offers domestic Flagship First service on transcontinental routes between New York–JFK and Los Angeles, New York–JFK and San Francisco, New York-JFK and Santa Ana, Boston and Los Angeles, and Miami and Los Angeles, as well as on the standard domestic route between New York-JFK and Boston. The airline will debut new Flagship Suite premium seats and a revamped aircraft interior for its long-haul fleet with fresh deliveries of its Airbus A321XLR and Boeing 787-9 aircraft, beginning in 2024.

Flagship Business

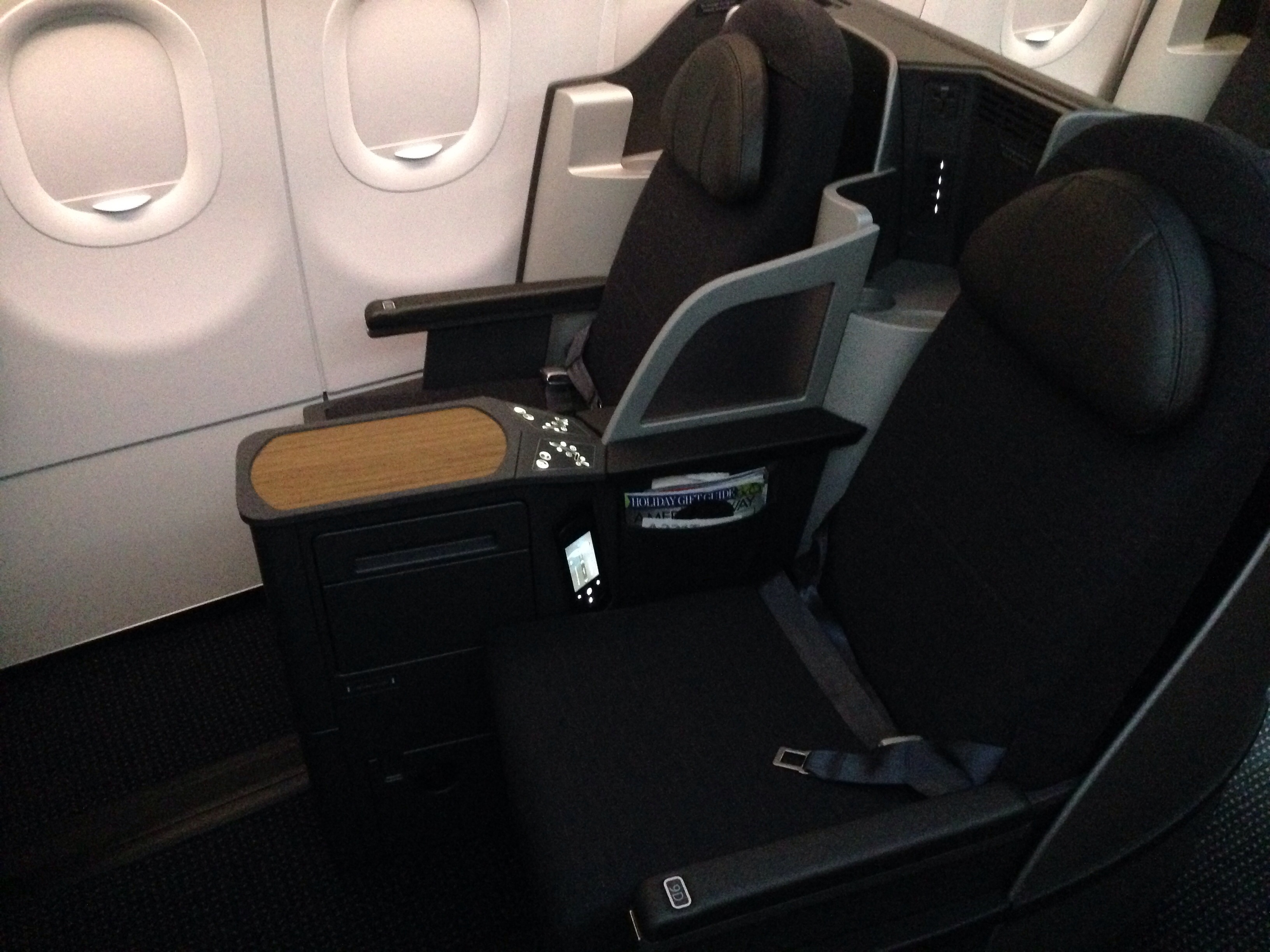
Flagship Business on an Airbus A321

Flagship Business is American's international and transcontinental business class product. It is offered on all Boeing 777-200ERs, Boeing 777-300ERs, Boeing 787-8s, and Boeing 787-9s, as well as select Airbus A321s. All Flagship Business seats are fully lie-flat. The amenities in Flagship Business include complimentary alcoholic/non-alcoholic beverages, multi-course meals, and lounge access.

First and Business

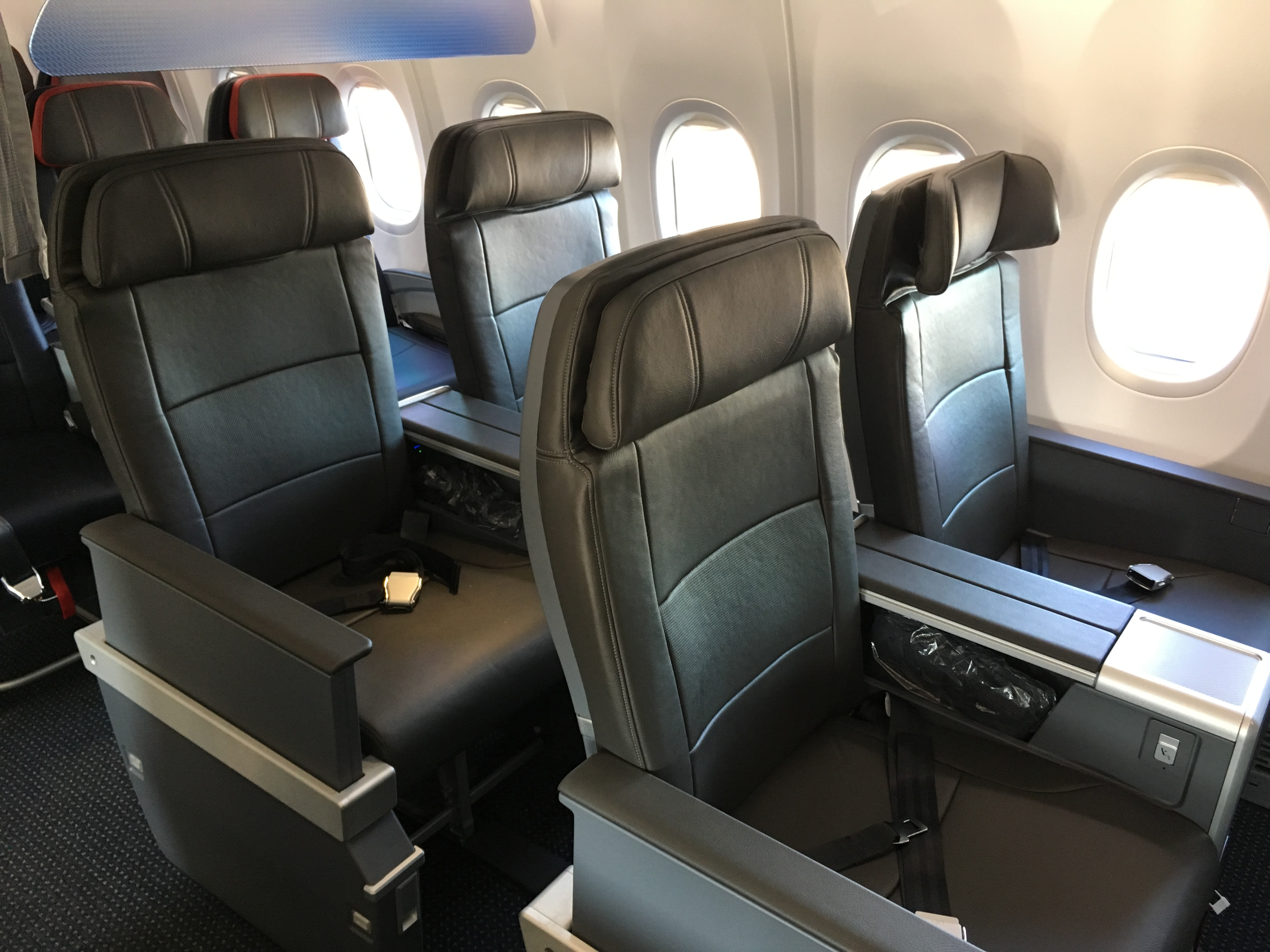
Domestic First on a Boeing 737 MAX 8

First Class is the highest class of service on domestically configured aircraft. When such aircraft are used on international services this cabin is branded as business class. Seats range from 19–21 inches (48–53 cm) in width and have 37–42 inches (94–107 cm) of pitch. Dining options include complimentary alcoholic and non-alcoholic beverages on all flights as well as standard economy snack offerings, enhanced snack basket selections on flights over 500 miles (800 km), and meals on flights 900 miles (1,400 km) or longer.

Premium Economy

Premium Economy is American's economy plus product. It is offered on all widebody aircraft. The cabin debuted on the airline's Boeing 787-9s in late 2016 and is also available on Boeing 777-200s and -300s, and Boeing 787-8s. Premium Economy seats are wider than seats in the main cabin (American's economy cabin) and provide more amenities: Premium Economy customers get two free checked bags, priority boarding, and enhanced food and drink service, including free alcohol. This product made American Airlines the first U.S. carrier to offer a four-cabin aircraft.

Main Cabin

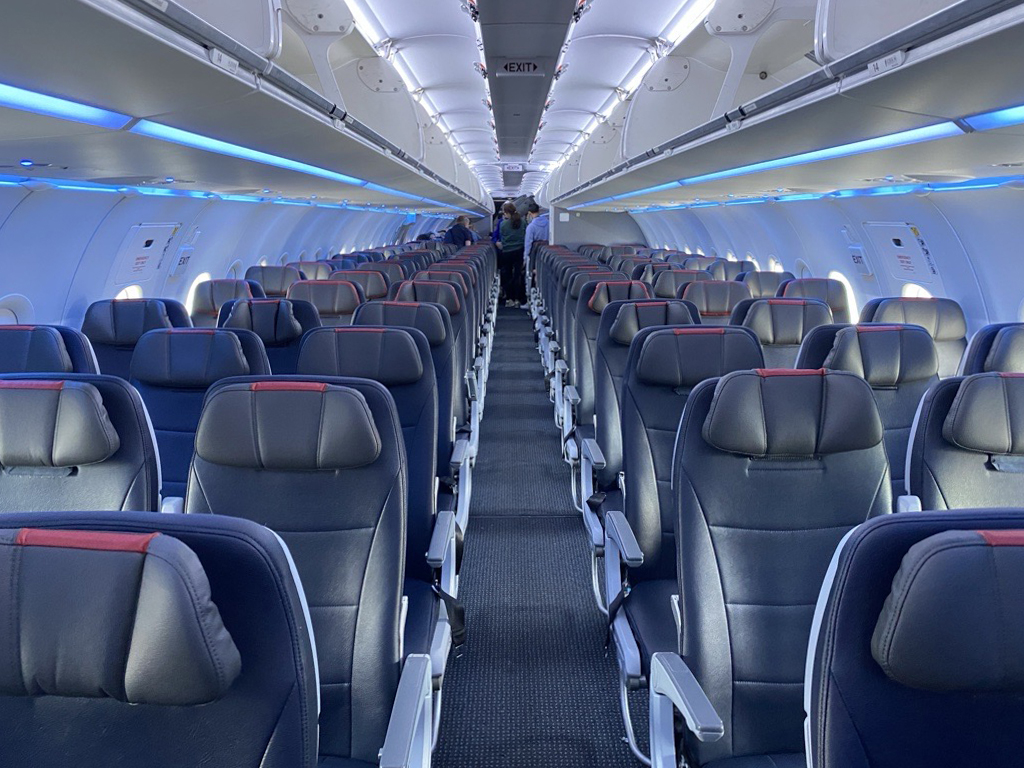
Main Cabin on an Airbus A321neo

Main Cabin (economy class) is American's economy product found on all mainline and regional aircraft in its fleet. Seats range from 17–18.5 inches (43–47 cm) in width and have 30–32 inches (76–81 cm) of pitch. American markets several rows within the main cabin immediately behind Main Cabin Extra as "Main Cabin Preferred", which requires an extra charge to select for those without status.

Main Cabin Extra

Main Cabin Extra seats are located in the front few rows and exit rows of the economy cabin on all aircraft and have additional pitch, complimentary alcoholic beverages and boarding one group ahead of the main cabin. It is available on all of the mainline fleet and American Eagle aircraft.

Basic Economy

American also offers Basic Economy, the airline's lowest main cabin fare on many routes. Basic Economy consists of a Main Cabin ticket with numerous restrictions, including waiting until check-in for a seat assignment, no upgrades or refunds, and boarding in the last group. Originally Basic Economy passengers could only carry a personal item. Later, American revised their Basic Economy policies to allow for a carry-on bag.

In May 2017, American announced it would add more seats to some of its Boeing 737 MAX 8 jets and reduce overall legroom in the basic economy class. The last three rows were to lose 2 inches (5.1 cm), going from the current 31 to 29 inches (79 to 74 cm). The remainder of the main cabin was to have 30 inches (76 cm) of legroom. This "Project Oasis" seating configuration has since been expanded to all 737 MAX 8s as well as standard Boeing 737-800 and non-transcontinental Airbus A321 jets. New Airbus A321neo jets have been delivered with the same configuration. This configuration has been considered unpopular with passengers, especially American's frequent flyers, as the new seats have less padding, less legroom, and no seatback entertainment.

== Reward programs ==
=== AAdvantage ===
AAdvantage is the frequent flyer program for American Airlines. It was launched on May 1, 1981, and remains the largest frequent flyer program, with over 115 million members as of 2021. Miles accumulated in the program allow members to redeem tickets, upgrade service class, or obtain free or discounted car rentals, hotel stays, merchandise, or other products and services through partners. The most active members, based on the accumulation of Loyalty Points with American Airlines, are designated AAdvantage Gold, AAdvantage Platinum, AAdvantage Platinum Pro, and AAdvantage Executive Platinum elite members, with privileges such as separate check-in, priority upgrade, and standby processing, or free upgrades. AAdvantage status corresponds with Oneworld status levels allowing elites to receive reciprocal benefits from American's Oneworld partner airlines.

AAdvantage co-branded credit cards are also available and offer other benefits. Currently cards are issued by CitiCards, a subsidiary of Citigroup in the United States, by several banks including Butterfield Bank and Scotiabank in the Caribbean, and by Banco Santander in Brazil. In December 2024, it was announced that American would be cutting ties with Barclays and would instead be rolling members into its partnership with Citigroup starting in 2026.

AAdvantage allows one-way redemption, starting at 7,500 miles.

=== Admirals Club ===
The Admirals Club was created by AA president C.R. Smith as a marketing promotion shortly after he was made an honorary Texas Ranger. Inspired by honorary titles like the Kentucky colonels, Smith designated high value passengers as "admirals" of the "Flagship fleet," which was AA's branding term for its aircraft at the time. The list of admirals included celebrities, politicians, VIPs, and frequent customers.

The first physical Admiral's Club opened shortly after the debut of LaGuardia Airport, then known as New York Municipal Airport. During construction, New York Mayor Fiorello LaGuardia had an upper-level lounge for press conferences and business meetings. When a reporter asked if that specific space would be leased along with the rest of the terminal, LaGuardia confirmed it would, and an AA executive immediately offered to rent it. The airline secured a liquor license and opened the space as the Admirals Club in 1939.

A second location opened at Washington National Airport. Because it was illegal to sell alcohol in Virginia at the time, the club provided refrigerators for members to store their own liquor. For many years, membership in the Admirals Club and most other airline lounges was strictly by invitation. After a passenger sued for discrimination, the club switched to a paid membership program in 1974.

=== Flagship Lounge ===
Though affiliated with the Admirals Club and staffed by many of the same employees, the Flagship Lounge is a separate lounge designed explicitly for customers flying in first class and business class on international flights and transcontinental domestic flights.

== Corporate affairs ==
=== Business trends ===
The key trends for American Airlines are (as of the financial year ending 31 December):

	Revenue (US$ b) (Note: Airline group)	Net income (US$ b)	Number of employees (FTE, k) (Note: Mainline)	Passenger enplanements (m)	Passenger load factor (%)	Fleet size	References
2015	41.0	7.6	99	201	83.0	946	
2016	40.1	2.7	101	198	81.7	930	
2017	42.6	1.9	103	194	81.9	948	
2018	44.5	1.4	102	203	82.0	956	
2019	45.8	1.7	104	215	84.6	942	
2020	17.3	−8.9	78	95	64.1	855	
2021	29.9	−2.0	97	165	75.3	865	
2022	49.0	0.1	102	199	82.9	925	
2023	52.8	0.8	103	210	83.5	965	
2024	54.2	0.8	103	226	84.9	977	
2025	54.6	0.1	106	224	83.6	1,013	

=== Ownership and structure ===
American Airlines, Inc., is publicly traded through its parent company, American Airlines Group Inc., under NASDAQ: AAL Nasdaq: AAL, with a market capitalization of about $8 billion as of 2026. In September 2024, it was removed from the S&P 500 index and placed into the S&P MidCap 400.

American Eagle is a network of six regional carriers that operate under a codeshare and service agreement with American, operating flights to destinations in the United States, Canada, the Caribbean, and Mexico. Three of these carriers are independent, and three are subsidiaries of American Airlines Group: Envoy Air Inc., Piedmont Airlines, Inc., and PSA Airlines Inc.

=== Headquarters ===
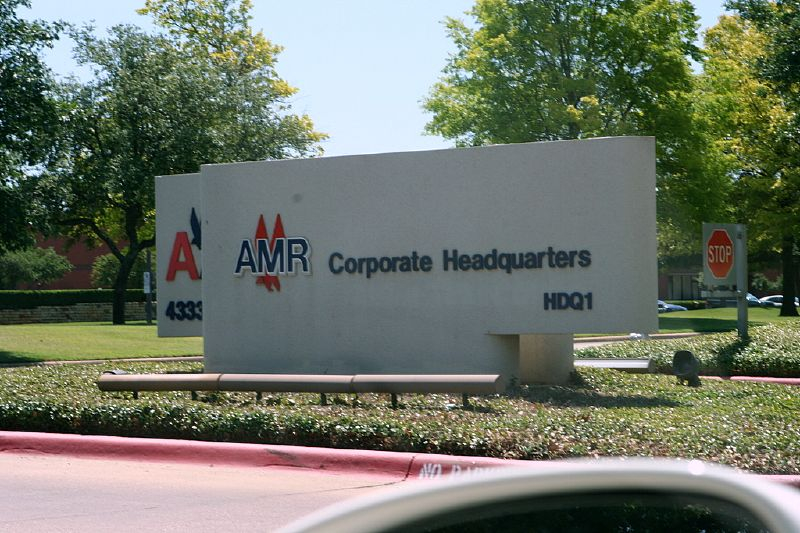
Image of the signage of the former headquarters

American Airlines is headquartered across several buildings in Fort Worth, Texas that it calls the "Robert L. Crandall Campus" in honor of former president and CEO Robert Crandall. The 1,700,000-square-foot (160,000 m^{2}), five-building office complex was designed by Pelli Clarke Pelli Architects. The campus is located on 300 acres, adjacent to Dallas/Fort Worth International Airport, American's fortress hub.

Before it was headquartered in Texas, American Airlines was headquartered at 633 Third Avenue in the Murray Hill area of Midtown Manhattan, New York City. In 1979, American moved its headquarters to a site at Dallas/Fort Worth International Airport, which affected up to 1,300 jobs. Mayor of New York City Ed Koch described the move as a "betrayal" of New York City. American moved to two leased office buildings in Grand Prairie, Texas. On January 17, 1983, the airline finished moving into a $150 million ($485,000,000 when adjusted for inflation), 550,000-square-foot (51,000 m^{2}) facility in Fort Worth; $147 million (about $475,000,000 when adjusted for inflation) in Dallas/Fort Worth International Airport bonds financed the headquarters. The airline began leasing the facility from the airport, which owns the facility. Following the merger of US Airways and American Airlines, the new company consolidated its corporate headquarters in Fort Worth, abandoning the US Airways headquarters in Phoenix, AZ.

As of 2015, American Airlines is the corporation with the most significant presence in Fort Worth.

In 2015, American announced it would build a new headquarters in Fort Worth. Groundbreaking began in the spring of 2016, and occupancy was completed in September 2019. The airline plans to house 5,000 new workers in the building.

It will be located on a 41-acre (17 ha) property adjacent to the airline's flight academy and conference and training center, west of Texas State Highway 360, 2 miles (3.2 km) west from the current headquarters. The airline will lease 300 acres (120 ha) from Dallas–Fort Worth International Airport, and this area will include the headquarters. Construction of the new headquarters began after the demolition of the Sabre facility, previously on the site.

The airline considered developing a new headquarters in Irving, Texas, on the old Texas Stadium site, before deciding to keep the headquarters in Fort Worth.

=== Corporate identity ===
American Airlines' fourth logo, used until 2013

==== Logo ====
In 1931, an American employee, Goodrich Murphy designed the AA logo as an entry in a logo contest. The eagle in the logo was copied from a Scottish hotel brochure. The initial logo contained large red letters on either side of the eagle, enclosed in a double red and white circle against a blue background. This initial logo laid the foundation for the visual identity of the airline for 80 years.

The logo was modified for the first time in 1946, eliminating the red and white circles and making the eagle more prominent. The corporate name was standardized in a sans-serif font in italic capital letters.

The visual identity was again updated in 1962 with the addition of a lighter red as an accent color and a medium grey replacing the grayish dark blue. The logo was enclosed in a red circle, the eagle designed to be more figurative, and the double A's compacted.

In 1967 with the airline expanding its fleet and competing for new routes, a review of its visual identity was initiated. in 1968, under the direction of Massimo Vignelli (founding partner of Unimark) a new identity program was created. According to Vignelli, the approach was "not styling but reductionist based on the notion of timelessness". A blue stylized bird (created by Henry Dreyfuss) was placed between Unimark's AA symbols, a design which endured until 2013.

Thirty years later, in 1997, American Airlines was able to make its logo Internet-compatible by buying the domain AA.com. AA is also American's two-letter IATA airline designator.

On January 17, 2013, American launched a new rebranding and marketing campaign with FutureBrand dubbed "A New American". This included a new logo, which includes elements of the 1967 logo.

American Airlines faced difficulty obtaining copyright registration for their 2013 logo. On June 3, 2016, American Airlines sought to register it with the United States Copyright Office, but in October of that year, the Copyright Office ruled that the logo was ineligible for copyright protection, as it did not pass the threshold of originality, and was thus in the public domain. American requested that the Copyright Office reconsider. Still, on January 8, 2018, the Copyright Office affirmed its initial determination. After American Airlines submitted additional materials, the Copyright Office reversed its decision on December 7, 2018, and ruled that the logo contained enough creativity to merit copyright protection.

==== Aircraft livery ====
American's early liveries varied widely, but a standard livery was adopted in the 1930s, featuring an eagle painted on the fuselage. The eagle became a symbol of the company and inspired the name of American Eagle Airlines. Propeller aircraft featured an international orange lightning bolt running down the length of the fuselage, which was replaced by a simpler orange stripe with the introduction of jets.

In the late 1960s, American commissioned designer Massimo Vignelli to develop a new livery. The original design called for a red, white, and blue stripe on the fuselage and a simple "AA" logo, without an eagle, on the tail; instead, Vignelli created a highly stylized eagle, which remained the company's logo until January 16, 2013.

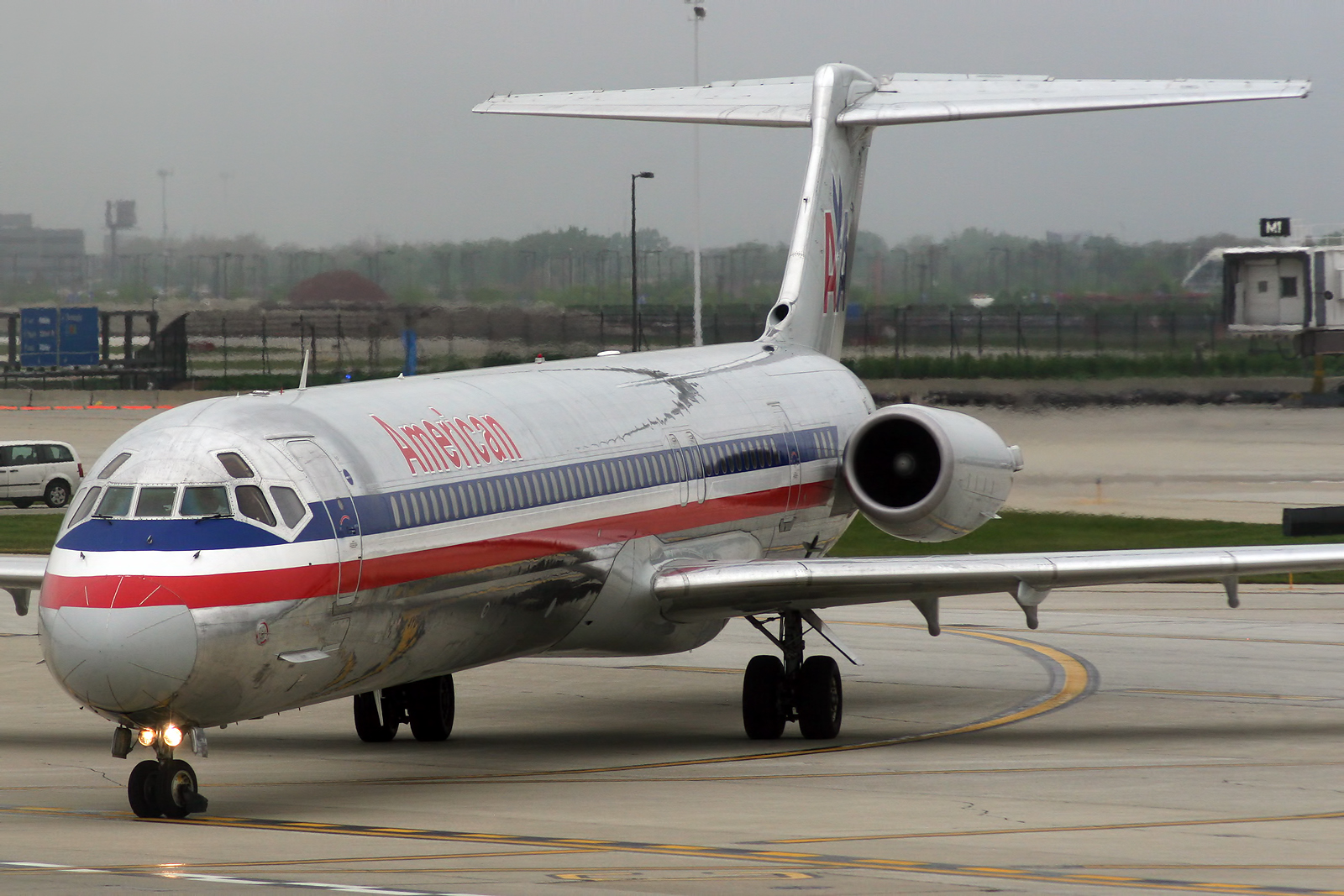
American's previous livery on an MD-83 at O'Hare International Airport in May 2012

On January 17, 2013, American unveiled a new livery. Before then, American had been the only major U.S. airline to leave most of its aircraft surfaces unpainted. This was because C. R. Smith would not say he liked painted aircraft and refused to use any liveries that involved painting the entire plane. Robert "Bob" Crandall later justified the distinctive natural metal finish by noting that less paint reduced the aircraft's weight, thus saving fuel costs.

In January 2013, American launched a new rebranding and marketing campaign dubbed "The New American". In addition to a new logo, American Airlines introduced a new livery for its fleet. The airline calls the new livery and branding "a clean and modern update". The current design features an abstract American flag on the tail, along with a silver-painted fuselage, as a throw-back to the old livery. The new design was painted by Leading Edge Aviation Services in California. Doug Parker, the incoming CEO, indicated that the new livery could be short-lived, stating that "[the] only reason this is an issue now is that they just did it right in the middle [of the merger], which kind of makes it confusing, so that allows us, actually, to decide if we are going to do something different because we have so many airplanes to paint". The current logo and livery have had mixed criticism, with Design Shack editor Joshua Johnson writing that they "boldly and proudly communicate the concepts of American pride and freedom wrapped into a shape that instantly makes you think about an airplane", and AskThePilot.com author Patrick Smith describing the logo as a linoleum knife poking through a shower curtain'. Later in January 2013, Bloomberg asked the designer of the 1968 American Airlines logo (Massimo Vignelli) on his opinion over the rebranding. Vignelli replied "now they have something other than Helvetica that's not as good or as powerful", adding that "it has no sense of permanence".

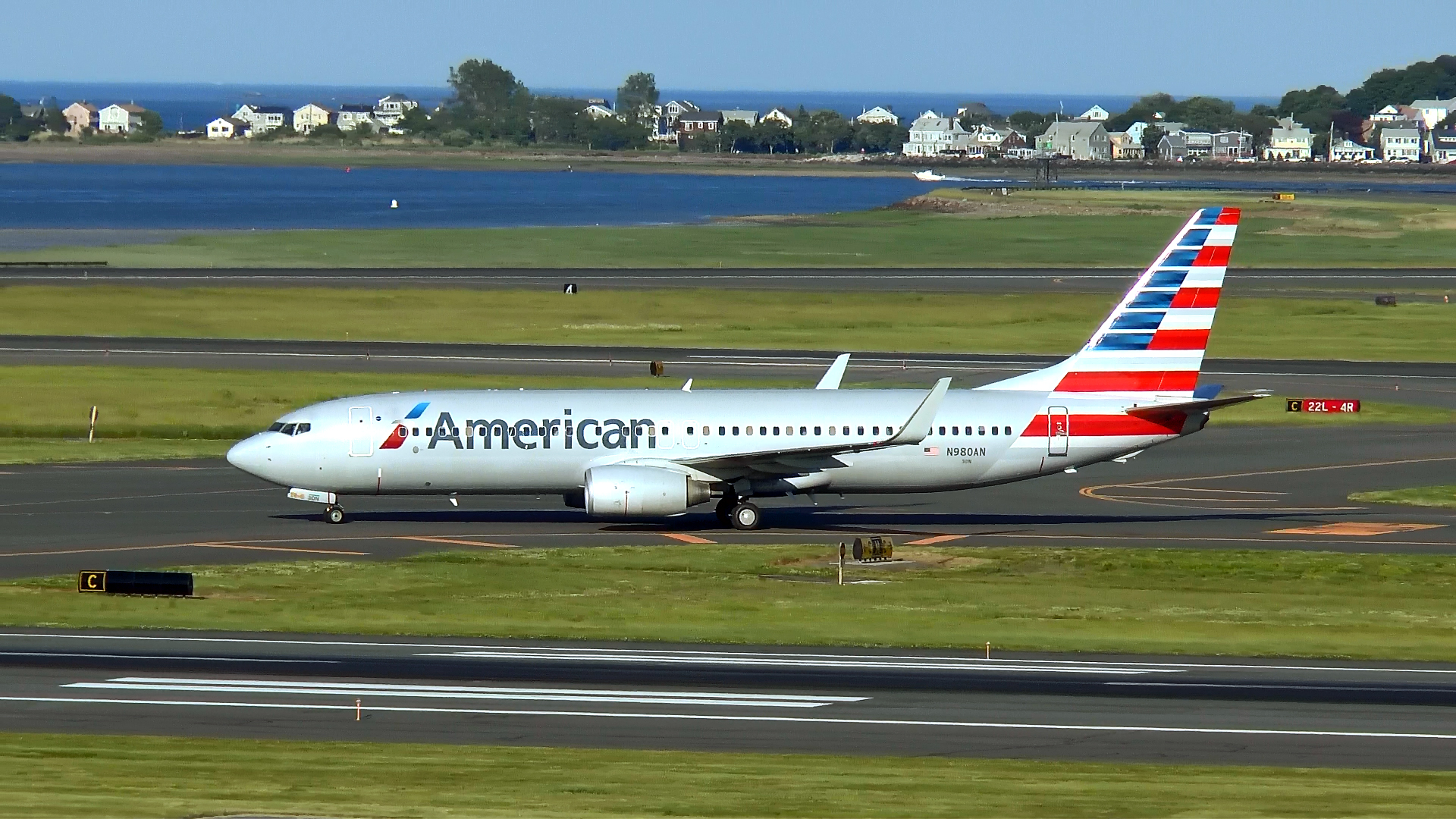
Boeing 737-800 in the current livery at Boston Logan International Airport in June 2013

In the end, American let their employees decide the new livery's fate. On an internal website for employees, American posted two options, one the new livery and one a modified version of the old livery. All of the American Airlines Group employees (including US Airways and other affiliates) were able to vote. American ultimately decided to keep the new look. Parker announced that American would keep a US Airways and America West heritage aircraft in the fleet, with plans to add a heritage TWA aircraft and a heritage American plane with the old livery. As of September 2019, American has heritage aircraft for Piedmont, PSA, America West, US Airways, Reno Air, TWA, Allegheny, and AirCal in their fleet. They also have two AA branded heritage 737-800 aircraft, an AstroJet N905NN, and the polished aluminum livery used from 1967 to 2013, N921NN.

=== Leadership ===
Chairman: Greg Smith (since April 2023)

Chief Executive Officer: Robert Isom (since March 2022)

=== Previous CEOs ===
- C. R. Smith (1934–1968 and 1973–1974)
- George A. Spater (1968–1973)
- Albert V. Casey (1974–1985)
- Robert Crandall (1985–1998)
- Donald J. Carty (1998–2003)
- Gerard Arpey (2003–2011)
- Thomas W. Horton (2011–2013)
- Doug Parker (2013–2022)

=== Customer service ===
American, both before and after the merger with US Airways, has consistently performed poorly in rankings. The Wall Street Journal's annual airline rankings have ranked American as the worst or second-worst U.S. carrier for ten of the past twelve years, and in the bottom three of U.S. airlines for at least the past twelve years. The airline has persistently performed poorly in the areas of losing checked luggage and bumping passengers due to oversold flights.

=== Worker relations ===
The main representatives of key groups of employees are:

- The Allied Pilots Association is an in-house union which represents the nearly 15,000 American Airlines pilots; it was created in 1963 after the pilots left the Air Line Pilots Association (ALPA). However the majority of American Eagle pilots are ALPA members.
- The Association of Professional Flight Attendants represents American Airlines flight attendants, including former USAirways flight attendants.
- Flight attendants at wholly owned regional carriers (Envoy, Piedmont, and PSA) are all represented by Association of Flight Attendants – Communications Workers of America (AFA-CWA). US Airways flight attendants were active members of AFA-CWA before the merger, and they are honorary lifetime members. AFA-CWA is the largest flight attendant union in the industry.
- The Transport Workers Union-International Association of Machinists alliance (TWU-IAM) represents the majority of American Airlines employed fleet service agents, mechanics, and other ground workers.
- American's customer service and gate employees belong to the Communications Workers of America/International Brotherhood of Teamsters Passenger Service Association.
- PAFCA-AAL represents the nearly 550 FAA-certificated Aircraft Dispatchers and Operations Specialists at American Airlines. This specialized group, many of whom are licensed pilots, former Air Traffic Control personnel, and military airmen share equal responsibility with the Pilot-in-Command for the safe conduct of each the flight.

In September 2024, the Association of Professional Flight Attendants ratified a five-year contract that included immediate wage increases of up to 20.5% and $514 million in retroactive pay, the first contract to include boarding pay for a unionized cabin crew in the United States. In January 2025, the TWU-IAM alliance reached a two-year contract extension covering approximately 34,000 ground workers, with raises of 18 to 26 percent. On February 9, 2026, the APFA board of directors issued a unanimous vote of no confidence in CEO Robert Isom, the first such action in the union's history.

=== Subsidiary companies ===
==== Sky Chefs ====
In 1942, American Airlines established Sky Chefs, a wholly owned subsidiary, as a catering company to serve their fleet. In 1986, Sky Chefs was sold to Toronto-based Onex Capital Corporation for $170 million. Sky Chefs became a subsidiary of Onex Food Services Inc. Since 2001, it has been fully owned by the LSG Group.

==== Flagship Hotels / Americana Hotels ====
In the late-1960s, American Airlines established the Flagship Hotels chain as a subsidiary of Sky Chefs. On July 21, 1972, American Airlines leased four hotels from the Loews Corporation, three of them branded as Americana Hotels, for a period of thirty years. American merged the hotels with their Flagship Hotels, and rebranded the entire chain as Americana Hotels. In 1980, American Airlines sold Americana Hotels to Bass Brothers Enterprises of Fort Worth, Texas.

== Controversies and conflicts ==
=== Environmental violations ===
Between October 1993 and July 1998, American Airlines received multiple citations for using high-sulfur fuel in motor vehicles at 10 major U.S. airports, a violation of the Clean Air Act.

=== Lifetime AAirpass ===
In 1981, to generate revenue during a period of financial losses, American Airlines offered an unlimited lifetime travel pass for an initial cost of $250,000. This pass allowed holders to fly worldwide without additional fares, and 28 passes were sold. However, the airline later determined that the program was costing them money, with some pass holders costing up to $1 million each due to high flight volumes, such as flying interstate for lunch or flying to London multiple times a month. AA raised the cost of the lifetime pass to $3 million before discontinuing it in 2003. The airline then used litigation to terminate two of the lifetime passes, citing fraudulent activity.

=== Cabin fume events ===
In 1988, on American Airlines Flight 132's approach into Nashville, flight attendants notified the cockpit that there was smoke in the cabin. The flight crew in the cockpit ignored the warning, as on a prior flight, a fume event had occurred due to a problem with the auxiliary power unit. However, the smoke on Flight 132 was caused by improperly packaged hazardous materials. According to the NTSB inquiry, the cockpit crew persistently refused to acknowledge that there was a serious threat to the aircraft or the passengers, even after they were told that the floor was becoming soft and passengers had to be reseated. As a result, the aircraft was not evacuated immediately on landing, exposing the crew and passengers to the threat of smoke and fire longer than necessary.

On April 11, 2007, toxic smoke and oil fumes leaked into the aircraft cabin as American Airlines Flight 843 taxied to the gate. A flight attendant who was present in the cabin subsequently filed a lawsuit against Boeing, stating that she was diagnosed with neurotoxic disorder due to her exposure to the fumes, which caused her to experience memory loss, tremors, and severe headaches. She settled with the company in 2011.

In 2009, Mike Holland, deputy chairman for radiation and environmental issues at the Allied Pilots Association and an American Airlines pilot, said that the pilot union had started alerting pilots of the danger of contaminated bleed air, including contacting crew members that the union thinks were exposed to contamination based on maintenance records and pilot logs.

In a January 2017 incident on American Airlines Flight 1896, seven flight attendants were hospitalized after a strange odor was detected in the cabin. The Airbus A330 involved subsequently underwent a "thorough maintenance inspection", having been involved in three fume events in three months.

In August 2018, American Airlines flight attendants picketed in front of the Fort Worth company headquarters over a change in sick day policy, complaining that exposure to ill passengers, toxic uniforms, toxic cabin air, radiation exposure, and other issues were causing them to be sick.

In January 2019, two pilots and three flight attendants on Flight 1897 from Philadelphia to Fort Lauderdale were hospitalized following complaints of a strange odor.

=== Discrimination complaints ===
On October 24, 2017, the NAACP issued a travel advisory for American Airlines urging African Americans to "exercise caution" when traveling with the airline. The NAACP issued the advisory after four incidents. In one incident, a black woman was moved from first class to coach while her white traveling companion was allowed to remain in first class. In another incident, a black man was forced to give up his seats after being confronted by two unruly white passengers. According to the NAACP, while they did receive complaints on other airlines, most of their complaints in the year before their advisory were on American Airlines. In July 2018, the NAACP lifted their travel advisory saying that American has made improvements to mitigate discrimination and unsafe treatment of African Americans.

=== Disability violations ===
In October 2024, the United States Department of Transportation imposed a $50 million penalty on American Airlines for violations of federal disability protection laws between 2019 and 2023, the largest such penalty ever assessed against an airline. The violations included unsafe physical assistance to wheelchair users and mishandling of thousands of wheelchairs. Of the $50 million, half was payable to the U.S. Treasury and half credited toward remediation investments including a wheelchair tracking system and additional staff at hub airports.

=== Industrial action ===
In 1999, American Airlines sued Allied Pilots Association for $45.5 million over damages due to strike action, one of the largest fines ever levied against a trade union.

In January 2020, the Allied Pilots Association filed a lawsuit to stop flights between the United States and China over concerns about COVID-19. The Association of Professional Flight Attendants supported the court action. At the time, COVID-19 was mostly contained to China and had not reached pandemic status yet. Because of this action, American Airlines suspended their flights the following day.

== Accidents and incidents ==
American Airlines Flight 11 explodes after impacting 1 World Trade Center during the September 11 attacks. Another plane from the airline, Flight 77, was crashed into the Pentagon one hour and nine minutes later. The hijacking and crash of Flight 11 was the deadliest aviation incident in history.

As of January 2025, American Airlines has had almost 60 aircraft hull losses, beginning with the crash of a Ford 5-AT-C Trimotor in August 1931. Of the hull losses, most were propeller-driven aircraft, including three Lockheed L-188 Electra aircraft (of which one, the crash in 1959 of Flight 320, resulted in fatalities). The two accidents with the highest fatalities in both the airline's and U.S. aviation history were Flight 191 in 1979 and Flight 587 in 2001.

Out of the 17 hijackings of American Airlines flights, two aircraft were hijacked and destroyed in the September 11 attacks: Flight 11 crashed into the North Tower of the World Trade Center and Flight 77 crashed into the Pentagon. Flight 11, which is responsible for an estimated 1,700 deaths, is the deadliest air crash in the history of aviation.

Two training flight accidents have occurred in which the crew was killed and six that resulted in no fatalities. Another four jet aircraft have been written off due to incidents while they were parked between flights or while undergoing maintenance.

== Environmental impacts and initiatives ==
American Airlines reported total CO2e emissions (direct and indirect) for the twelve months ending December 31, 2020, at 20,092 Kt (-21,347 /-51.5% y-o-y). The company aims to achieve net zero carbon emissions by 2050. In November 2023, American Airlines purchased the first carbon credit contract (for 10,000 metric tons of CO_{2} sequestered at $100 per ton) from Graphyte, a carbon removal startup company invested in by Breakthrough Energy that compresses sawdust, tree bark, rice hulls, plant stalks, and other agricultural waste into biomass bricks wrapped in a polymer barrier to prevent decomposition that are stored underground.

American Airlines' annual total CO2e emissions - Location-based scope 1 + scope 2 (in kilotonnes)
Dec 2016	Dec 2017	Dec 2018	Dec 2019	Dec 2020
39,254	39,388	40,604	41,439	20,092

American Airlines emitted roughly between 40,000,000-45,000,000 metric tons of carbon dioxide equivalents (MTCDE) annually between 2014-2019. In 2020, emissions declined to 20,000,000 MTCDE as a result of travel restrictions during the COVID-19 pandemic, and have since increased back up to 40,000,000 MTCDE in 2023. According to Bloomberg terminal data, American Airlines receives an overall Environmental Social Governance (ESG) score of 5.82, which is ranked as a “leading” score compared to competitors in the industry.

== See also ==
- AAirpass
- Air transportation in the United States
- List of airlines of the United States
- List of airports in the United States
- US Airways, which merged with American Airlines in 2013

== Notes and references ==
Notes

== Bibliography ==
- Cearley, G.W. (1982). American Airlines-An illustrated history. Dallas (TX): Airline Historical Publications.
- Serling, Robert J. (1985). Eagle-The story of American Airlines (1st ed.). New York: St. Martin's/Marek. ISBN 0-312-22453-2. OCLC 12107802.
- Cearley, G.W. (1987). American Airlines-America's leading airline. Dallas (TX): Airline Historical Publications.
- Reed, Dan (1993). The American eagle-The ascent of Bob Crandall and American Airlines (1st ed.). New York: St. Martin's Press. ISBN 0-312-08696-2. OCLC 27173065.
- Forty, Simon (1997). American Airlines. Vergennes (VERMONT): Plymouth Press. ISBN 1-882663-21-7. OCLC 39542166.
- Bedwell, Don (1999). Silverbird-The American Airlines story. Sandpoint (IDAHO): Airways International. ISBN 0-9653993-6-2. OCLC 43762553.
- Szurovy, G. (2000). Classic American airlines (1st ed.). St. Paul (MINNESOTA): Motorbooks International/MBI Publishing Co.
- Capozzi, John M. (2001). A spirit of greatness-Stories from the employees of American Airlines (1st ed.). Fairfield (CONN.): JMC Pub. Services. ISBN 0-9656410-3-1. OCLC 40986912.
- Hieger, Linda H. (2010). With wings of silver and gold-The history and uniforms of American Airlines stewardesses/flight attendants. ISBN 978-1-60458-271-0. OCLC 682191394.
