= Graphite (album) =

Music album

Studio album by Closterkeller
- Released: April 26, 1999 (Poland)
- Recorded: March 1999 at Q-Sound studio, Poland
- Genre: Gothic rock
- Length: 66:28
- Label: Metal Mind Productions
- Producer: Anja Orthodox, Krzysztof Najman, Tomasz Dziubiński

Closterkeller chronology
Cyan (1996)	Graphite (1999)	Nero (2003)

Singles from Graphite
- 1. "Na krawędzi/Ate" Released: 1999; 2. "Czas komety" Released: 1999

Graphite (english version)

Studio album by Closterkeller
- Released: March 12, 2003 (United States)
- Recorded: English vocals recorded in December 2002
- Genre: Gothic rock
- Length: 65:34
- Label: Pitchfork Promotions, Metal Mind Productions
- Producer: Jacek Gawłowski, Anja Orthodox, Krzysztof Najman

Graphite is the sixth studio album by Polish gothic rock band Closterkeller. It was released on April 26, 1999 in Poland through Metal Mind Productions. The album was recorded at Q-Sound studio in March 1999. The cover art was created by Tomasz "Graal" Daniłowicz and fotos by Edward Wosk and Marcin Wegner. English version of album was released on March 12, 2003 in United States through Pitchfork Promotions.

Graphite is considered to be one of the most important albums in the history of Polish rock.

== Track listing ==
No.	Title	Length
1.	"Ate"	4:05
2.	"Na krawędzi"	4:21
3.	"Syrenka"	3:29
4.	"Perła"	7:12
5.	"Inny obszar"	5:14
6.	"Sztuka ambicji"	3:42
7.	"Ewa i Adam"	4:49
8.	"Dwa dni"	3:46
9.	"Zaklęta w marmur"	4:34
10.	"Czas komety"	3:56
11.	"Rozbijacz symboli"	4:11
12.	"Miłość za pieniądze"	3:33
13.	"Fortepian"	5:15
14.	"Graphite"	7:01

== Track listing (english release) ==
No.	Title	Length
1.	"Athe"	4:05
2.	"Somewhere inbetween"	4:21
3.	"The mermaid"	3:29
4.	"A pearl"	7:12
5.	"The secret place"	5:14
6.	"The ego game"	3:42
7.	"Eve and Adam"	4:49
8.	"Two days"	3:46
9.	"Marble-enchanted"	4:34
10.	"The reign of the comet"	3:56
11.	"The symbol shatterer"	4:11
12.	"Love for money"	3:33
13.	"The piano"	5:15
14.	"Graphite"	7:01

== Personnel ==
- Anja Orthodox - vocal, keyboards, effects, lyrics
- Paweł Pieczyński - guitar
- Krzysztof Najman - bass
- Gerard Klawe - percussion
- Michał Rollinger - keyboards
- Tomasz "Mech" Wojciechowski - keyboards

Music - Closterkeller.

== Music videos ==
- "Na krawędzi" (1999)
- "Czas komety" (1999)

== Release history ==
=== Original release ===
Year	Label	Format	Country	Out of Print?	Notes
1999	Metal Mind Productions	CD	Poland	Yes	Original CD release
2002	Metal Mind Productions	CD	Poland	Yes	Box with Pastel album

=== English release ===
Year	Label	Format	Country	Out of Print?	Notes
2003	Pitchfork Promotions, Metal Mind Productions	CD	United States, Poland	No	Original CD release
