= Graphyte =

Company which sequesters carbon

- Company type: Private
- Industry: Carbon sequestration
- Founded: 2023
- Founder: Bill Gates
- Area served: United States
- Products: Carbon removal credits
- Services: Biomass carbon removal and storage (BiCRS)
- Website: http://graphyte.com/

Graphyte is a company which sequesters carbon, initially for American Airlines. It was founded and backed by Bill Gates in 2023. Its carbon removal credits are not yet on sale to the public, but are planned to be sold on voluntary carbon markets, of which the US has several. The company sequesters carbon by drying and compressing biomass into bricks, then wrapping those bricks in impermeable barriers and storing them underground. Such biomass carbon removal and storage (BiCRS) is the cheapest method of removing carbon dioxide from the atmosphere long-term as of the mid-2020s.

== History ==
Graphyte was founded in February 2023 with backing from Breakthrough Energy Ventures, the climate investment fund established by Bill Gates. The company was created to commercialize a proprietary carbon removal process known as 'carbon casting'. Carbon casting converts low-value agricultural and timber residues into dense, impermeable blocks that are stored underground to sequester carbon for over a thousand years, relying on a combination of biological capture via photosynthesis and engineered storage for permanence.

Initially after its founding, Graphyte focused on bringing its carbon casting approach to market by establishing its first commercial facility, known as the Loblolly Project, in Pine Bluff, Arkansas. Construction on the facility began in 2023, with operations launching in early 2024. The project rapidly achieved operational milestones; by April 2024, it was officially opened and became one of the world’s largest durable carbon dioxide removal sites, with an initial removal capacity of approximately 15,000 metric tons of CO2 per year and expansion plans to increase annual output to around 50,000 metric tons by the end of 2025. The site sources local timber and agricultural by-products, processing them into carbon blocks for underground storage.

In November 2023 American Airlines signed an agreement to purchase 10,000 tons of permanent carbon removal from Graphyte. This deal was the company’s first commercial purchase agreement. The company also launched a public-facing online platform in August 2024 to make verified removals available to individual consumers and small businesses.

To support the expansion of its operations, Graphyte closed a $30 million Series A funding round in July 2024. The round was led by Prelude Ventures and Carbon Direct Capital, with continued participation from Breakthrough Energy Ventures and Overture.
