= Closterkeller =

Polish gothic rock band

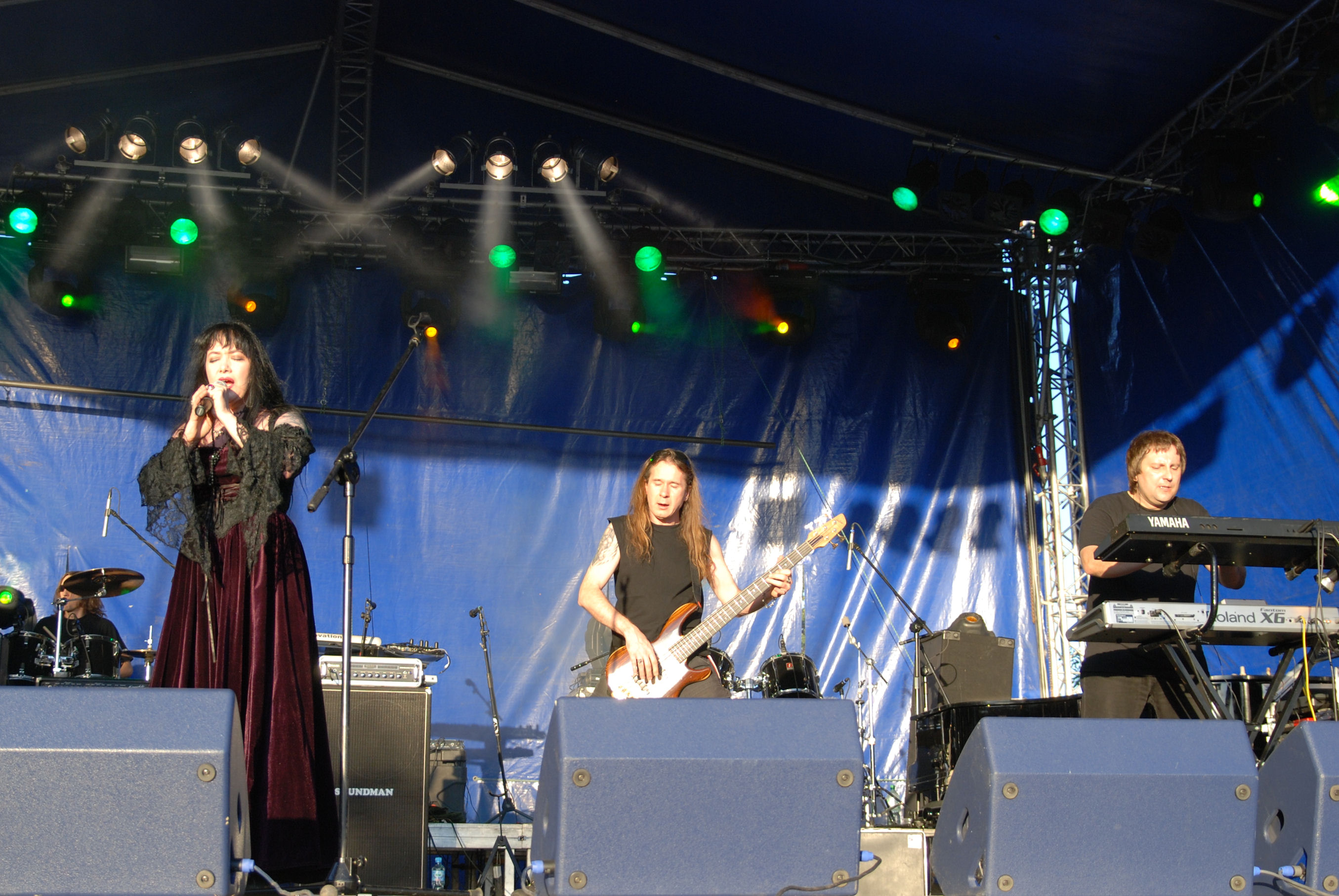
- Closterkeller at Castle Party 2008

Background information
- Origin: Warsaw, Poland
- Genres: Gothic rock
- Years active: 1988–present
- Labels: SPV, Polskie Radio, Izabelin Studio, Metal Mind, Universal Music Poland
- Members: Anja Orthodox; Michał "Rollo" Rollinger; Michał Jarominek; Krzysztof Najman; Adam Najman
- Website: anja.pl

Closterkeller is a Polish gothic rock band from Warsaw. It was formed in 1988 by Przemysław Guryń, Jacek Skirucha, and the vocalist Anja Orthodox. Despite many changes in the band's line-up it has created a characteristic sound. Orthodox is the only member of the original line-up, performing continuously for over 30 years. The band is called one of the forerunners of gothic and atmospheric rock in Poland. They are also influenced by other music styles such as new, cold wave, and heavy metal. Many other groups like Delight, Moonlight or Artrosis said they took inspiration from Closterkeller.

== Line-up ==
=== Current members ===
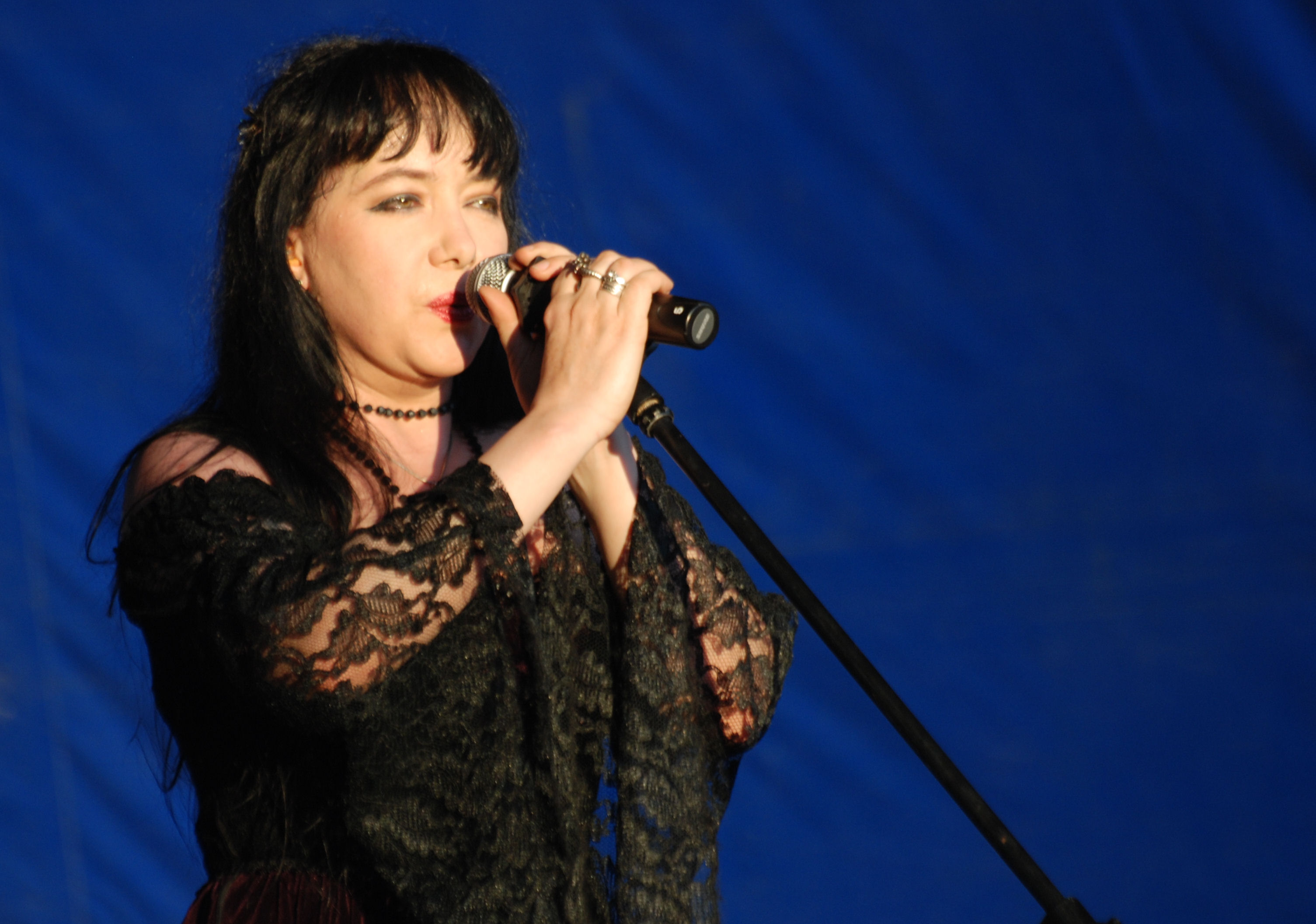
Anja Orthodox, the band's sole constant member

- Anja Orthodox – vocals, keyboards (1988–present)
- Michał "Rollo" Rollinger – keyboards (1990–present)
- Adam "Najman" Najman – drums (2014–present)
- Krzysztof Najman - bass guitar (1992-1999, 2006-2014, 2021-present)

=== Former members ===
- Grzegorz Tomczyk – drums (1988–1989)
- Przemysław Guryn – keyboards (1988–1991)
- Jacek Skirucha – guitars (1988–1992)
- Tomasz "Wolfgang" Grochowalski – bass guitar (1988–1992)
- Andrzej "Szczota" Szymańczak (deceased) – drums (1989–1991)
- Piotr Bieńkowski – drums (1989–1990)
- Marcin "Freddie" Mentel – guitars (1999–2006)
- Paweł Pieczyński – guitars (1992–1999)
- Robert Ochnio – guitars (1992)
- Marcin "Pucek" Płuciennik – bass guitar (1999–2006)
- Piotr "Pawłoś" Pawłowski – drums (1991–1997)
- Dariusz Boral – keyboards (1995–1996)
- Tomasz "Mechu" Wojciechowski – keyboards, guitars (1996–1998)
- Andrzej Kaczyński – bass guitar (1999)
- Piotr Czyszanowski – bass guitar (1999)
- Tomasz Kasprzycki – guitars (1992)
- Mikis Cupas – guitars (1991)
- Jarosław Kidawa – guitars (1991)
- Zbigniew Kumorowski – drums (1990–1991)
- Krzysztof Dominik – drums (1989)
- Janusz Jastrzębowski – drums (2006–2011)
- Gerard "Gero" Klawe – drums (1997–2006, 2011–2013)
- Robert "Qba" Kubajek – drums (2013–2014)
- Zuzanna "ZuZa" Jaśkowiak – guitars (2014)
- Mariusz Kumala – guitars (2006–2013, 2014–2015)
- Aleksander "Olek" Gruszka - bass guitar (2014-2021)
- Michał Jarominek - guitars (2015-2025)

== Discography ==
=== Studio albums ===
| Title | Album details | Peak chart positions | Sales | Certifications |
| Title | Album details | POL | Sales | Certifications |
|---|---|---|---|---|
| Purple | Released: 3 September 1990; Label: Polton; Formats: CD, CS, LP | — | POL: 20,000+ | |
| Blue | Released: 3 March 1992; Label: SPV Records; Formats: CD, CS | — | | |
| Violet | Released: 6 December 1993; Label: Izabelin Studio; Formats: CD, CS | — | POL: 20,000+ | |
| Scarlet | Released: 16 January 1996; Label: Izabelin Studio; Formats: CD, CS | — | POL: 100,000+ | POL: Gold |
| Cyan | Released: 29 April 1996; Label: Izabelin Studio; Formats: CD, CS | — | POL: 40,000+ | |
| Graphite | Released: 26 April 1999; Label: Metal Mind Productions; Formats: CD, CS | — | | |
| Nero | Released: 14 October 2003; Label: Metal Mind Productions; Formats: CD | 25 | | |
| Aurum | Released: 5 October 2009; Label: Universal Music Poland; Formats: CD | 15 | POL: 10,000+ | |
| Bordeaux | Released: 16 September 2011; Label: Universal Music Poland; Formats: CD, digital download | 11 | | |
| Viridian | Released: 22 September 2017; Label: Universal Music Poland | 7 | | |
| Argento | Released: 15 October 2025; Label: Universal Music Poland | | | |
"—" denotes a recording that did not chart or was not released in that territory.

=== Compilation albums ===
| Title | Album details | Peak chart positions |
| Title | Album details | POL |
|---|---|---|
| Pastel | Released: 28 November 2000; Label: Metal Mind Productions; Formats: CD, CS | 46 |
"—" denotes a recording that did not chart or was not released in that territory.

=== Mini-Albums ===
| Title | Album details | Peak chart positions |
| Title | Album details | POL |
|---|---|---|
| Agnieszka | Released: 16 March 1993; Label: SPV Records; Formats: CD, CS | — |
| Reghina | Released: 18 October 2004; Label: Metal Mind Productions; Formats: CD | 34 |
"—" denotes a recording that did not chart or was not released in that territory.

=== Live albums ===
| Title | Album details |
|---|---|
| Koncert '97 | Released: 14 April 1997; Label: Izabelin Studio; Formats: CD, CS |
| Fin de siecle | Released: 29 February 2000; Label: Polskie Radio; Formats: CD |
| reScarlet (Note: A two-disc release, containing a remastered version of "Scarlet" on one CD and a live recording, from the Summer Fall Festival in Płock, on the other.) | Released: 16 October 2015; Label: Universal Music Poland; Formats: CD |

=== Video albums ===
| Title | Album details |
|---|---|
| Act III Live 2003 | Released: 26 August 2003; Label: Metal Mind Productions; Formats: DVD |
| Act IV Przystanek Woodstock 2008 | Released: 2 March 2009; Label: Złoty Melon; Formats: DVD |

=== Music videos ===
- "Purple" (1990, directed by: Marek Jurkowski)
- "Nieuchwytny" (1990, directed by: Marek Jurkowski)
- "Maska" (1990, directed by: Marek Jurkowski)
- "Czekając na dzień" (1991, directed by: Marek Jurkowski)
- "I jeszcze raz do końca" (1991, directed by: Marek Jurkowski)
- "Immanoleo" (1992, directed by: Marek Jurkowski)
- "Blue" (1992, directed by: Marek Jurkowski)
- "Spokój" (1992, directed by: Marek Jurkowski)
- "Iluzyt" (1992, directed by: Marek Jurkowski)
- "Agnieszka" (1993, directed by: no data)
- "W moim kraju" (1993, realization: Katarzyna Kanclerz)
- "Babeluu" (1994, realization: Katarzyna Kanclerz)
- "Supernova" (1994, realization: TVP)
- "Scarlett" (1995, directed by: Jerzy Grabowski)
- "Owoce wschodu" (1995, directed by: no data)
- "Dlaczego noszę broń" (1995, realization: TVP)
- "Władza" (1996, directed by: no data)
- "Cisza w moim domu" (1996, directed by: no data)
- "Dwa dni" (1997, realization: TVP)
- "Na krawędzi" (1999, directed by: no data)
- "Czas komety" (1999, directed by: no data)
- "Zegarmistrz światła" (2000, directed by: no data)
- "A nadzieja" (2000, production: Krzysztof Wasilewski)
- "Poza granicą dotyku" (2003, directed by / realization: Radek "LarryTM" Grabiński)
- "Ktokolwiek widział" (2004, directed by / realization: Radek "LarryTM" Grabiński)
- "Królowa" (2004, directed by / realization: Radek "LarryTM" Grabiński)
- "Lunar" (2005, directed by: no data)
- "Nocarz" (2010, directed by: Stanisław Mąderek)
- "Nie tylko gra" (2010, directed by: Stanisław Mąderek)
- "Ogród półcieni" (2010, directed by: no data)
