= Nero (Closterkeller album) =

Album by Closterkeller

Studio album by Closterkeller
- Released: October 16, 2003 (Poland)
- Recorded: August–September 2003 at Zeman-Krason studio, Poland
- Genre: Gothic rock Gothic metal
- Length: 67:47
- Label: Metal Mind Productions
- Producer: Tomasz Dziubiński, Anja Orthodox

Closterkeller chronology
Act III (2003)	Nero (2003)	Reghina (2004)

Professional ratings
Review scores
Source	Rating
Teraz Rock	link
Metal Hammer	5/5 stars

Nero (English version)

Studio album by Closterkeller
- Released: February 23, 2004 (United States)
- Recorded: English vocals recorded in December 2003 at New Production Studio, Warsaw
- Genre: Gothic rock Gothic metal
- Length: 65:34
- Label: Pitchfork Promotions, Metal Mind Productions
- Producer: Tomasz Dziubiński, Anja Orthodox

English version
Review scores
Source	Rating
Metal Glory	link

Nero is the seventh studio album by Polish gothic rock band Closterkeller. It was released on October 16, 2003 in Poland through Metal Mind Productions. The album was recorded on August–September 2003 at Zeman-Krason studio. The cover art was created by Agnieszka Szuba. An English version of the album was released on February 23, 2004 in the United States and the Netherlands through Bertus Distributie, Pitchfork Promotions.

== Track listing ==
No.	Title	Length
1.	"Patrząc jak toniesz"	6:50
2.	"Podziemny krąg"	6:27
3.	"Kiedy latam"	5:49
4.	"Jak o kamień deszcz"	6:50
5.	"Królowa"	7:21
6.	"On przychodzi nocą"	4:25
7.	"Nero"	5:29
8.	"Miraż"	8:27
9.	"Nieważne jak będzie"	5:01
10.	"Poza granica dotyku"	5:02
11.	"Ktokolwiek widział"	6:10

=== Bonus Tracks ===
No.	Title	Length
11.	"Ktokolwiek wie (only on DG version)"	5:50
12.	"Grzech (only on DG version)"	6:14

== Track listing (English release) ==
No.	Title	Length
1.	"Watching as you drown"	6:54
2.	"Fight club"	6:27
3.	"As I glide"	6:00
4.	"Like rain against stone"	6:50
5.	"Queen"	7:27
6.	"He comes when the night falls"	4:25
7.	"Nero"	5:25
8.	"Mirage"	8:27
9.	"No matter what will be"	5:01
10.	"Amber"	5:02
11.	"Sin"	6:14
12.	"Have you seen"	6:02

== Personnel ==
- Anja Orthodox - vocal, synthesizer, lyrics
- Marcin Mentel - guitar
- Marcin Płuciennik - bass
- Gerard Klawe - percussion
- Michał Rollinger - keyboards

Music - Closterkeller.

== Music videos ==
- "Poza granicą dotyku" (2003)
- "Ktokolwiek widział" (2004)
- "Królowa" (2004)

== Release history ==
=== Original release ===
Year	Label	Format	Country	Out of Print?	Notes
2003	Metal Mind Productions	CD	Poland	No	Original CD release; videoclip; also available in DG version

=== English release ===
Year	Label	Format	Country	Out of Print?	Notes
2004	Pitchfork Promotions, Bertus Distributie, Metal Mind Productions	CD	United States, Netherlands, Poland	No	Original CD release; different tracklist; different cover
