= Hoover Field =

Former airport for Washington, DC

Coordinates: 38.87°N 77.05°W

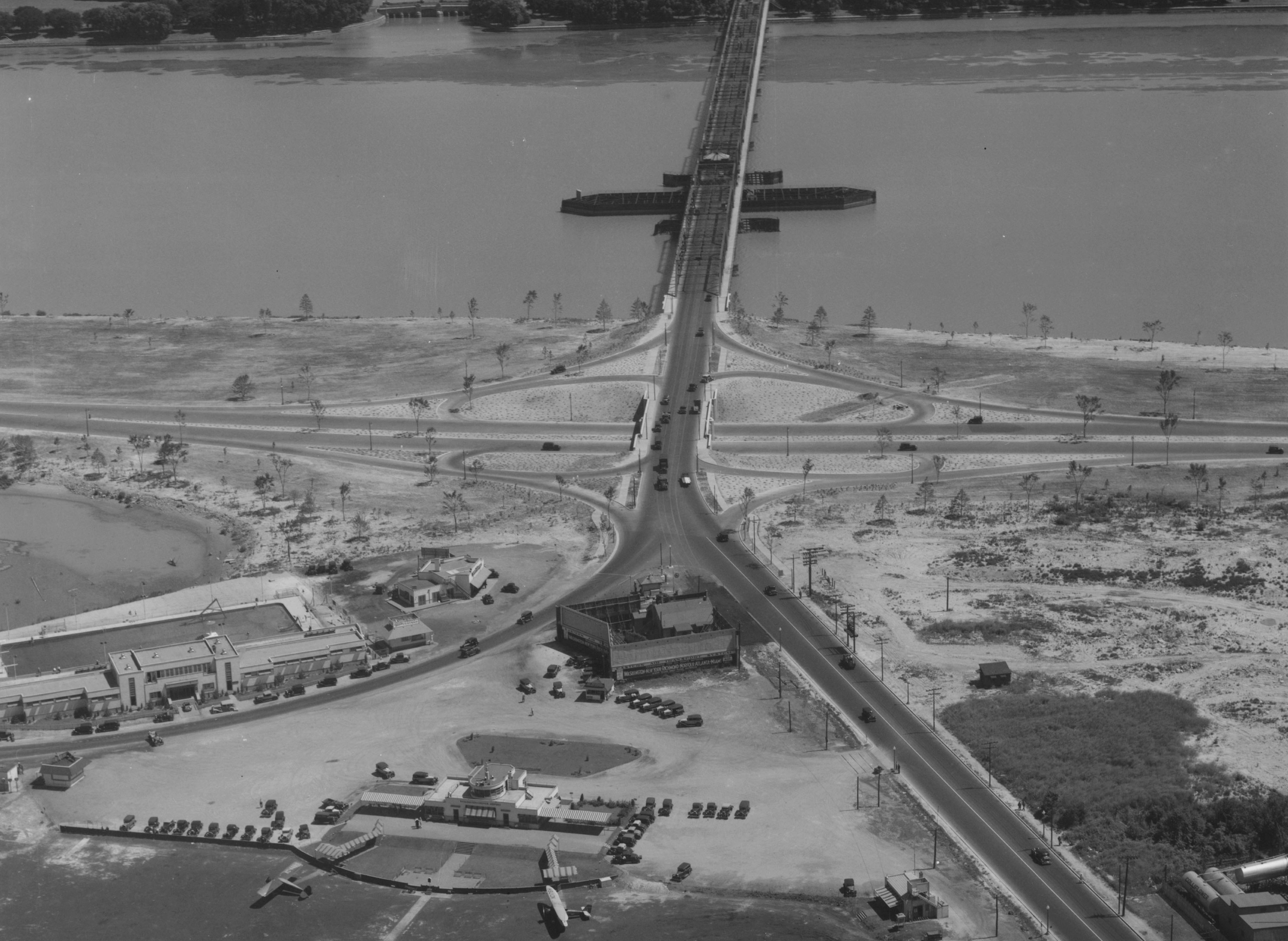
- Hoover Field (bottom and left) and Washington Airport (right) at the foot of Highway Bridge in 1932
- IATA: none; ICAO: none

Summary
- Owner: Philadelphia Rapid Transit Company (1925-June 1927); Henry Berliner (June 1927-July 1928); Mt. Vernon Airways (July 1928-November 1928); International Airways (November 1928-January 1929); Atlantic Seaboard Airways (January 1929-December 29, 1929); New Standard Aircraft Company (December 30, 1929-July 31, 1933); National Aviation Corporation (July 31, 1933-merger on August 2, 1933)
- Serves: Washington Metropolitan Area
- Location: Arlington County, Virginia
- Interactive map of Hoover Field

Hoover Field was an early airport serving the city of Washington, D.C. It was constructed as a private airfield in 1925, but opened to public commercial use on July 16, 1926. It was located in Arlington, Virginia, near the intersection of the Highway Bridge and the Mount Vernon Memorial Parkway, where the Pentagon and its northern parking lots now stand.

Considered one of the most hazardous airfields in the United States, Hoover Field suffered from short and unpaved runways, numerous life-threatening obstructions around the field, poor visibility (due to a burning garbage dump to its northwest), and poor drainage. It was purchased by the owner of nearby Washington Airport in early 1929, causing a brief merger of the two fields, but was sold to a new owner just 12 months later. It nearly went bankrupt in 1933, and was sold at auction and merged with Washington Airport to become Washington-Hoover Airport on August 2, 1933.

Washington-Hoover Airport closed in June 1941. Washington National Airport (now Ronald Reagan Washington National Airport) was built as its replacement.

== Construction ==
Hoover Field was built in 1925 by Thomas E. Mitten, president of the Philadelphia Transportation Company, which held the airmail contract between Washington, D.C., and Philadelphia. Hell's Bottom, a 37.5-acre (15.2 ha) site at the foot of the Highway Bridge in Arlington County, Virginia (formerly a horse racing track) directly across the Potomac River from the city, was selected by Mitten for the site of his new "airport." Pioneering aviator Alys McKey Bryant helped clear trees and brush and run the tractor which leveled the land for the airfield. The single sod runway was 2,400 feet (730 m) long. A single hangar, 60 feet (18 m) by 100 feet (30 m) in size, was constructed. Construction ended in 1925, and at first the field was used only by planes giving sight-seeing tours over the national capital.

The then-unnamed airfield was threatened with competition almost immediately. Because the field was privately owned, civic leaders began a campaign for the city of Washington to build a publicly owned municipal airport. The federal government considered filling in all or part of Kingman Lake and using the lake, Kingman Island, and nearby Heritage Island for a federal airport to compete with the nascent field in Arlington, but this plan died in August 1926. The government's actions and Mitten's desire to fly people between D.C. and Philadelphia for the 150th anniversary of the Declaration of Independence led Mitten to expand his airfield. The new airfield was dedicated on July 16, 1926. It was named for then-Secretary of Commerce Herbert Hoover, a major promoter of civil aviation.

The roughly trapezoidal airport was built along a north-by-northeast axis, was approximately 2,500 feet (760 m) long and 600 feet (180 m) wide, and 37.35 acres (15.12 ha) in size. The only navigational aid was a windsock.

=== Conditions at the field ===
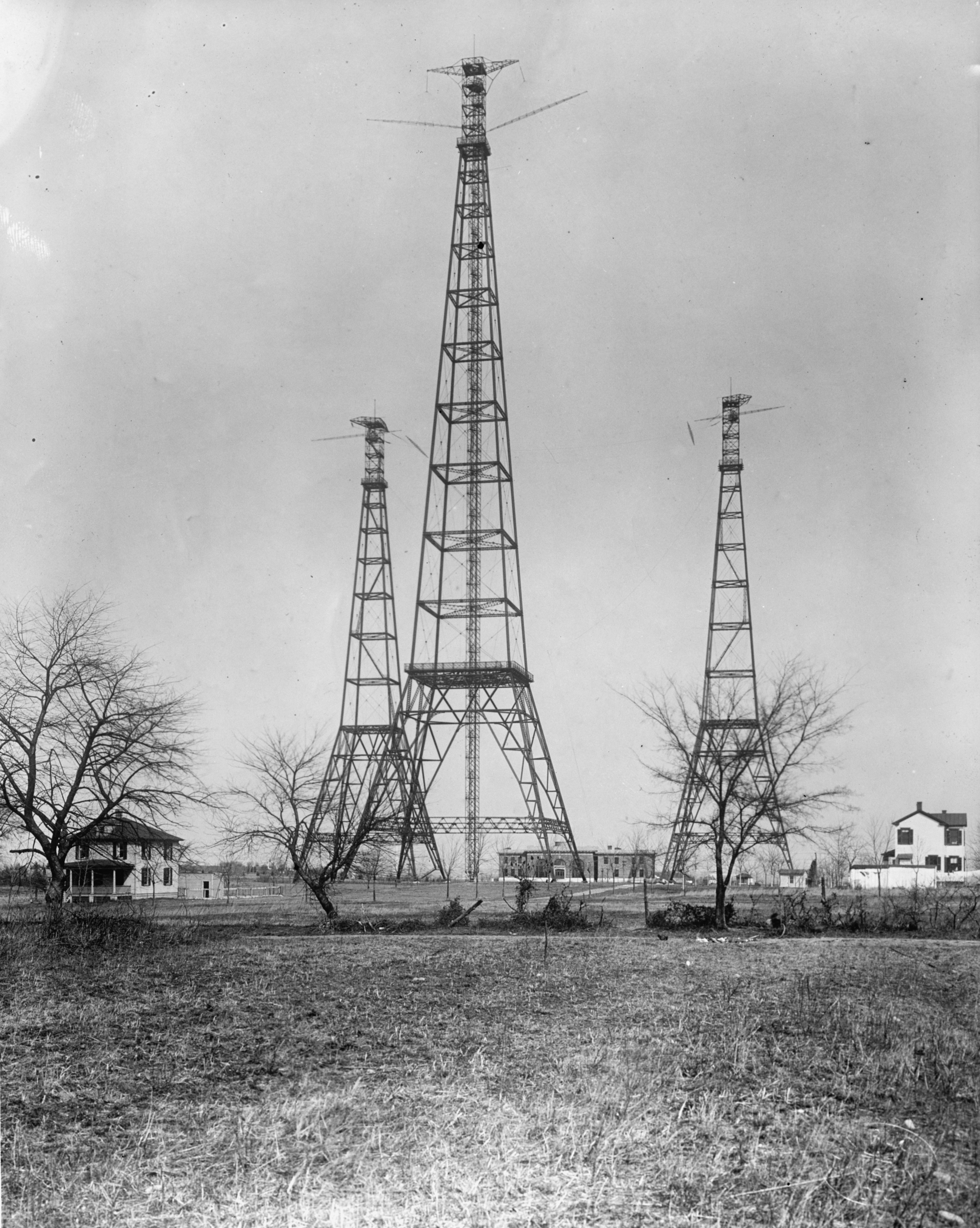
The Arlington Radio Towers, one of the many dangerous safety hazards near the edge of Hoover Field.

Flying conditions at Hoover Field were notoriously poor. Arlington Beach, a local amusement park, was located on the north-northeastern edge of the airport (next to Highway Bridge), and a landfill on the north-northwestern side. The trash in the landfill was also on fire. The smoke sometimes obscured the landing field, and the stench was notorious through the city of Washington. The United States Department of Agriculture owned the 400 acres (160 ha) Arlington Experimental Farm immediately adjacent to the northwestern edge of the field. A public swimming pool was located at the airport, and local children often crossed the runway to get to it.

Safety conditions at the airport were so poor due to these and other obstructions that local businesses and city officials again called for the construction of a city-owned airport in a safer location just three months after Hoover Field was rededicated. In late 1926, the National Aeronautic Association sought to lease Hoover Field from Mitten in order to upgrade it and turn it into Washington's municipal airport. Their goal was to use Hoover Field temporarily while soil was dredged from the Potomac to create new land near Gravelly Point for a much-expanded new municipal airport. But these talks failed. In February 1927, a group of aviators and aviation companies, led by aviation pioneer Henry Berliner, called for the establishment of a new, larger airport on the site of just across Military Road (the southern boundary of Hoover Field). Although no field was built there at this time, an airport (Washington Airport) was built there in 1928.

== Operations and ownership changes ==
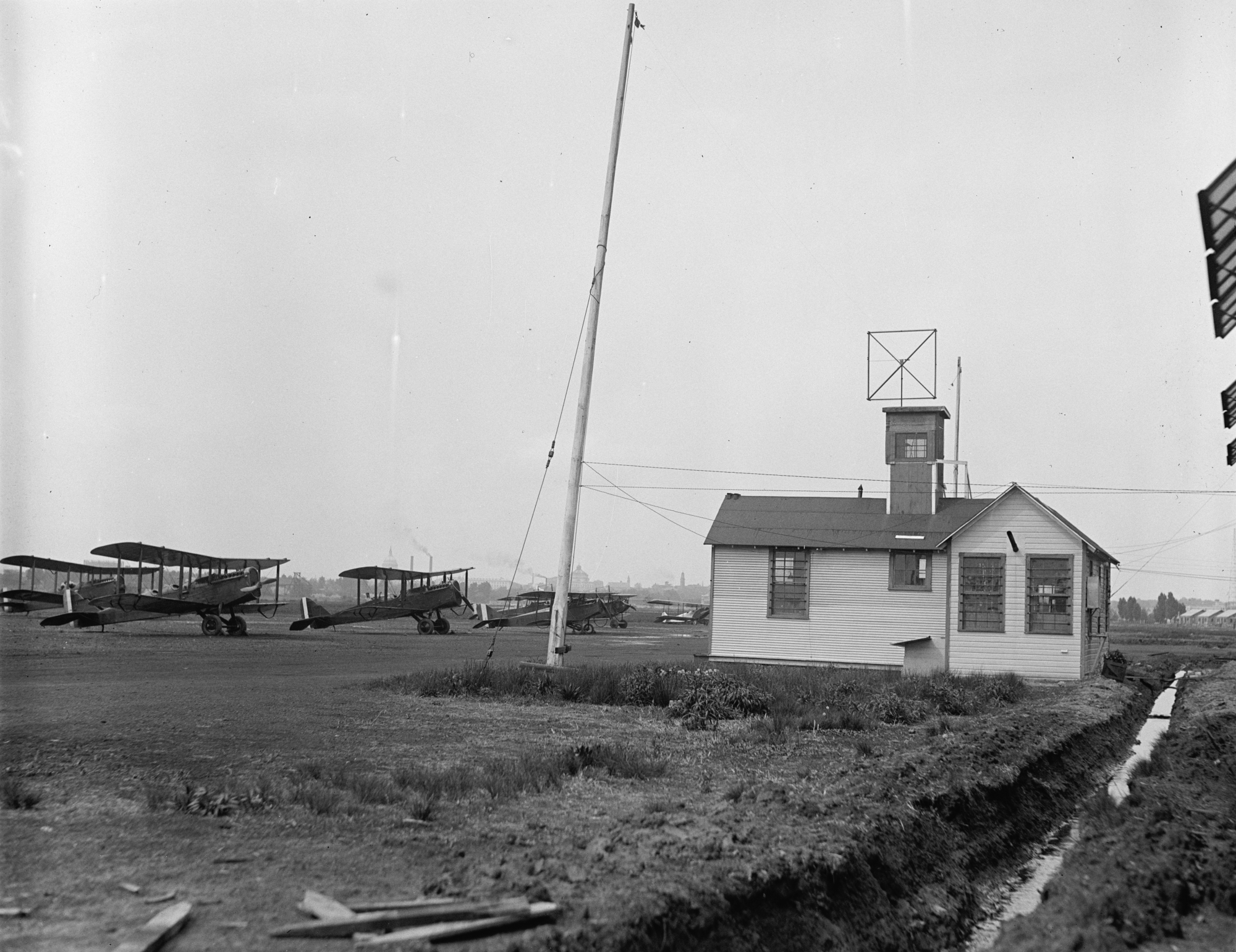
Biplanes sit on a sod apron at Hoover Field. The dome of the U.S. Capitol building can be seen over the plane in the middle. Smokestacks and other tall buildings, safety hazards for which the airport was notorious, line the horizon.

In June 1927, the new airmail contractor for the federal government refused to use Hoover Field any longer because it was so unsafe. Airmail service was transferred to nearby Bolling Field, a military airport. Hoover Field's location—bordered by highways, rivers, and federally owned land—also prevented its expansion to accommodate newer aircraft requiring longer runways.

At about the same time, Henry Berliner began leasing and later took majority ownership in Hoover Field. As Berliner secured his interest in the airport, a number of government officials and businessmen suggested that the United States Department of Agriculture sell its experimental agricultural fields to Hoover Field for expansion. But this plan was not acted on.

A fire at the field on July 3, 1928, destroyed eight planes and the hangar, causing $100,000 in damages ($1.275 million in 2010 inflation-adjusted dollars). Flights out of Hoover Field were suspended for 18 days. Berliner's finances were significantly damaged by the fire, and he sold his interest in Hoover Field to E.W. Robertson's Mount Vernon Airways on July 20, 1928. A few months later, on September 11, 1928, the first daily flights from Washington, D.C., to New York City began out of Hoover Field.

By November 1928, a Canadian company, International Airways, had taken over control of the airfield from Mount Vernon Airways. Despite its small size, three foreign flights per day left Hoover Field, and in the 18 months prior to December 1928 the airport saw more than 50,000 flights depart. In June 1928, it set an area record for sending 4,200 passengers aloft in a single month. But these statistics belied the very real dangers at the field. In 1928, a pilot and engineer were killed when their plane crashed during take-off. Later that year, a plane attempting to land at night struck a car parked on the field, injuring four.

In early 1929, a new holding company, Atlantic Seaboard Airways, was created to take over International Airways and its subsidiary aviation businesses. The owners of Atlantic Seaboard also owned Washington Airport (see below), and for a time the two fields were operated by the same company (although not merged). But on December 30, 1929, a group of investors led by R.H. Reiffen, chairman of the New Standard Aircraft Company, purchased Atlantic Seaboard Airways and took control of Hoover Field.

Safety at the airfield improved somewhat in mid-1932, after Arlington County commissioners revoked permits for the burning of trash at all landfills in the county—including the one next to Hoover Field, but not the one next to Washington Airport.

== Merger ==
Washington Airport was built because a newly formed airline needed a terminal in Washington, D.C. The new airfield opened without fanfare in late 1927 as a field for sight-seeing planes. Its owners included Robert E. Funkhouser, Herbert Fahy, and other investors. Funkhouser was an investor and officer in several different small airlines in the mid-Atlantic region. Herbert J. "Hub" Fahy was a Lockheed Aircraft Company test pilot. The airport added acreage and improved its facilities, and in February 1928 Funkhouser, Fahy, and the others formed Seaboard Airways. Seaboard's base of operations was Washington Airport. But Washington Airport was only marginally safer than Hoover Field. The owners could not afford to pave the runway, and the burning trash dumps nearby also obscured the runways at Washington Airport.

=== First merger ===
In June 1928, Funkhouser and Fahy created United States Air Transport as a holding company for Seaboard Airways, Washington Airport, and Funkhouser's other aviation businesses. In March 1929, Funkhouser and Fahy formed Atlantic Seaboard Airways with the intent of taking over International Airways and Hoover Field. Ira C. Eaker was named general manager of Atlantic Seaboard. United States Air Transport was itself taken over in June 1929 by Federal Aviation Corporation, an airline based in New York City. Federal Aviation announced it was buying an additional 104 acres (42 ha) (which included the Arlington Beach theme park) for $675,000, with the goal of expanding into a six-runway airport with one runway dedicated solely to departing flights.

On December 30, 1929, Federal Aviation sold Hoover Field to the New Standard Aircraft Co., ending unified control of the two fields. In July 1931, Federal Aviation (and Washington Airport) was slated to be purchased by National Aviation Corporation, an airline financing corporation originally organized in 1928. This transaction did not occur, but that did not end National Aviation Corp.'s relationship with Washington Airport. Despite the ownership changes, beginning around 1930 the two fields entered into a cooperative agreement. Hoover Field agreed to host all sight-seeing, flight schools, and small planes, while Washington Airport agreed to only be used by larger military, mail, and passenger aircraft. Upon completion, 50 sight-seeing and 30 commercial flights were scheduled per day.

=== Second merger ===
Hoover Field and Washington Airport both suffered significant financial setbacks during the Great Depression. In 1933, both airports merged after a series of quick financial transactions.

Washington Airport was the first to be sold, and the buyers were the Ludingtons. Nicholas S. Ludington and his brother, Charles Townsend Ludington, were co-owners of the Philadelphia Flying Service, a pilot training school and demonstration airplane manufacturer established in 1922. The Ludingtons became quite wealthy, and in 1929 Charles was on the board of directors of the Aviation Corporation—an aviation investment company in which some of the richest men in shipping, railroads, and investment banking had put their money. The brothers also were managers of Camden Airport, near Philadelphia. In June 1930, the Ludingtons founded New York-Philadelphia-Washington Airways (soon to be renamed Ludington Airline), an eastern seaboard airline which famous aviator Amelia Earhart joined as Vice President. The Ludingtons sold their airline to Eastern Air Transport in February 1933, and Eastern Air Transport was in turn acquired by North American Aviation a month later. These transactions left the Ludingtons with plenty of cash. On July 8, 1933, Federal Aviation put Washington Airport up for auction. D.C. attorney H. Rozier Dulany, Jr. (son of the famous Virginia horse breeder) held a $255,000 first mortgage against the property and the Ludingtons held a $160,000 second mortgage, payments on which Washington Airport was unable to make. North American Aviation (owner of the Ludington's newly sold airline) passed on the chance to buy the property. At auction on July 17, 1933, an unidentified buyer purchased Washington Airport for $432,000.

Hoover Field was sold just days later. New Standard Aircraft Co. had also been unable to make payments on Hoover Field's mortgages by July 1933. The Ludingtons owned a $155,442 first mortgage on Hoover Field, while William Morgan (a D.C. physician) held a second mortgage worth $9,500. The Hoover Field auction was set for July 31. At auction, the Ludingtons bought Hoover Field for $174,500.

The evening after the Hoover Field auction, the secret buyer of Washington Airport emerged: National Airport Corporation, a division of National Aviation Corporation. National Aviation Corporation, an aviation investment corporation, had been formed in July 1928. Almost unknown in aviation circles, it now owned one airport near the nation's capital. Twenty-four hours later, National Aviation purchased Hoover Field from the Ludingtons for an undisclosed sum.

The two airfields merged into a new airport named Washington-Hoover Airport. It opened on August 2, 1933, and closed to the public when Washington National Airport opened on June 16, 1941. It remained open as a private field for small aircraft, but closed on September 16, 1941, when the United States Department of War purchased Washington-Hoover Airport for $1 million to construct The Pentagon.

== Bibliography ==
- Arlington Historical Society. Arlington. Charleston, S.C.: Arcadia Publishing, 2000.
- Bednarek, Janet R. Daly. America's Airports: Airfield Development, 1918-1947. College Station, Tex.: Texas A&M University Press, 2001.
- Crouch, Tom D. Wings: A History of Aviation From Kites to the Space Age. Washington, D.C.: Smithsonian National Air and Space Museum, 2004.
- Dietrich, Zula. Zula Remembers. Fort Valley, Va.: Loft Press, 2005.
- Dailey, Franklyn E. The Triumph of Instrument Flight: A Retrospective in the Century of U.S. Aviation. Wilbraham, Mass.: Dailey International Publishers, 2004.
- Evans-Hylton, Patrick. Aviation in Hampton Roads. Charleston, S.C.: Arcadia, 2005.
- Fitzhugh, Richard. "Bomber Crew." In Bomber Command: American Bombers in Original World War II Color. Jeffrey Ethell, ed. Osceola, Wisc.: MBI/Sparkford/Haynes, 2003.
- Goode, James M. Capital Losses: A Cultural History of Washington's Destroyed Buildings. 2d ed. Washington, D.C.: Smithsonian Institution, 2003.
- Goode, James M. "Flying High: The Origin and Design of Washington National Airport." Washington History. 1:2 (Fall 1989).
- Lebow, Eileen F. Before Amelia: Women Pilots in the Early Days of Aviation. Washington, D.C.: Brassey's, 2002.
- Leuchtenburg, William Edward. Herbert Hoover. New York: Times Books, 2009.
- McQuaid, Kim. Uneasy Partners: Big Business in American Politics, 1945-1990. Baltimore, Md.: Johns Hopkins University Press, 1994.
- Peck, Margaret C. Washington Dulles International Airport. Charleston, S.C.: Arcadia Publishing, 2005.
- Schom, Alan. The Eagle and the Rising Sun: The Japanese-American War, 1941-1943, Pearl Harbor Through Guadalcanal. New York: W.W. Norton, 2004.
- Walch, Timothy. Uncommon Americans: The Lives and Legacies of Herbert and Lou Henry Hoover. Westport, Conn.: Praeger, 2003.
- Wood, John Walter. Airports: Some Elements of Design and Future Development. New York: Coward-McCann, 1940.
- Vogel, Steve. The Pentagon: A History. New York: Random House, 2008.
- Zukowsky, John and Bosma, Koos. Building for Air Travel: Architecture and Design for Commercial Aviation. Munich: Prestel, 1996.
