= Washington Airport =

Former aerodrome in Arlington, VA

Coordinates: 38.87°N 77.05°W

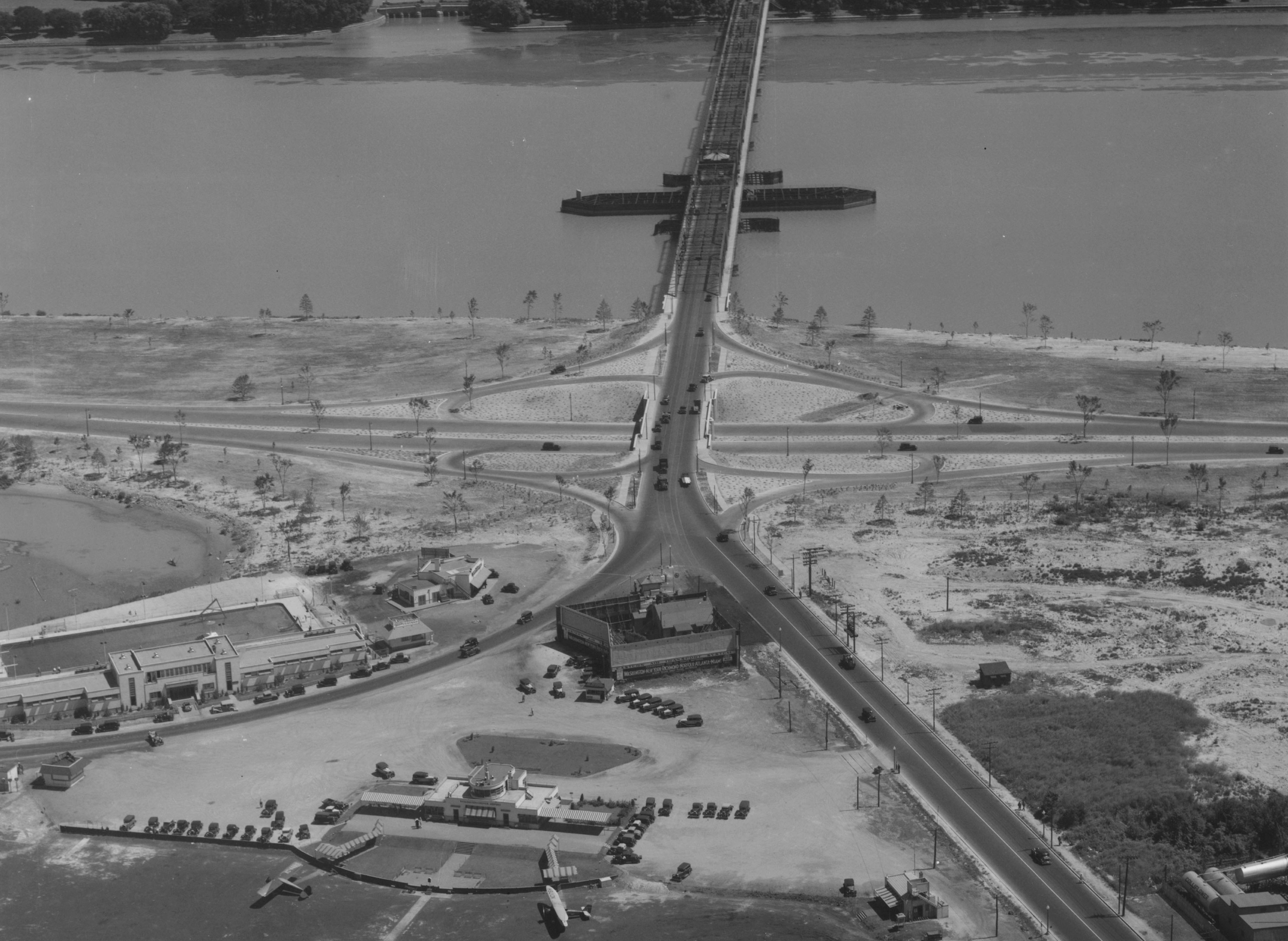
- Hoover Field (bottom and left) and Washington Airport (right) at the foot of Highway Bridge in 1932
- IATA: none; ICAO: none

Summary
- Owner: Funkhouser, Fahy, et al. (late 1927-February 1928); Seaboard Airways (February 1928-June 1928); United States Air Transport (June 1928-March 1929); Atlantic Seaboard Airways (March 1929-June 1929); Federal Aviation Corporation (June 1929-July 17, 1993); National Aviation Corp (July 17, 1933-August 2, 1933)
- Serves: Washington Metropolitan Area
- Location: Arlington County, Virginia
- Interactive map of Washington Airport

Washington Airport was the second major airport to serve the city of Washington, D.C., in the United States. Located in Arlington, Virginia, near the intersection of the Highway Bridge and the Mount Vernon Parkway (in a site now occupied by The Pentagon's south parking lots, Metrobus bus bays, and a portion of Interstate-395 highway). The first airport to serve the city was Hoover Field, a private airfield constructed in 1925. Washington Airport, a private airport triple the size of Hoover Field, was built literally across the road in late 1927. The airfield suffered from short and unpaved runways, numerous life-threatening obstructions around the field, poor visibility due to a burning garbage dump adjacent to each field, and poor drainage. Washington Airport nearly went bankrupt in 1933, and it was auctioned off to the owner of Hoover Field, who merged the two into a single airfield, Washington-Hoover Airport.

Washington-Hoover Airport closed in 1941 when replacement facility Washington National Airport (now Ronald Reagan Washington National Airport) was opened.

== Construction ==
Washington Airport emerged due to the need of a newly formed airline for a terminal in Washington, D.C. The new Washington Airport opened without fanfare in late 1927 as a field for sight-seeing planes. Its owners included Robert E. Funkhouser, Herbert Fahy, and other investors. Funkhouser was an investor and officer in several different small airlines in the mid-Atlantic region. Herbert J. "Hub" Fahy was a Lockheed Aircraft Company test pilot. The airport added acreage and improved its facilities, and in February 1928 Funkhouser, Fahy and the others formed Seaboard Airways. Seaboard's base of operations was Washington Airport.

But Washington Airport was only marginally safer than Hoover Field. Arlington Beach, a local amusement park with a Ferris wheel and high rollercoasters, was located to the northeast (on the downstream side of Highway Bridge), and a landfill existed on the eastern side. The trash in the landfill was also on fire. The smoke sometimes obscured the landing field, and the stench was notorious through the city of Washington. The owners also could not afford to pave the runways.

== Improvements ==
The field was dramatically enlarged (and the coastline of the Potomac River altered) in April 1928 when Washington Airport contracted to receive tens of thousands of cubic yards of earth, dug during the construction of the Federal Triangle complex of buildings in the District of Columbia, and used them to fill in the sides and ends of the field. An airport office was also constructed at Military Road. The expansion and land reclamation increased the size of the airport six times, to 97.31 acres (39.38 ha). The airport's new size was so impressive that in March 1930 President Herbert Hoover proposed that the federal government loan the government of the District of Columbia $2.5 million to take over both Hoover Field and Washington Airport, fill in the Boundary Channel between the Virginia shoreline and Columbia Island, and create a new city-owned municipal airport that would be a model for the nation. In August 1930, with construction largely completed on the new facilities, Washington Airport announced that it would begin 10 hourly flights between Washington, Philadelphia, and New York City.

The expansion effort ran into serious problems in September 1929 when the Smoot Sand and Gravel Corp. began constructing a rock wall along the high-water mark of the Potomac River. The rock wall was being built by the federal government, and was intended to support the fill dirt that was being placed there for the construction of Mount Vernon Boulevard (that portion of what is now the George Washington Memorial Parkway from Arlington Memorial Bridge to Mount Vernon). Washington Airport claimed it had title down to the low-water mark. The legal case went all the way to the Supreme Court of the United States, which held two years later in Smoot Sand & Gravel Corp. v. Washington Airport, Inc., 283 U.S. 348 (1931) that the proper boundary of the state of Virginia was the high-water mark.

Although this changed the company's plans, work still went ahead on the razing of the Arlington Beach amusement park, construction of three paved new runways on the theme park grounds, a new paved runway on the site of the existing airport, razing of the old hangar and office building, construction of a new hangar 160 feet (49 m) by 100 feet (30 m) in size and a new and larger office building. By year's end, however, the airport had changed its plans. It now intended to build two hangars, one 120 feet (37 m) by 100 feet (30 m) in size and the other 50 feet (15 m) by 110 feet (34 m) in size. (Paving of the runways was also canceled in favor of oiled earth.) Construction on the new buildings began in January 1930. The hangars were designed by the firm of Lockwood, Green & Co., while the terminal was designed by the architectural firm of Holden, Stott, & Hutchinson. Total cost of the two structures, whose designs were approved by the United States Commission of Fine Arts, was $85,000. Forty-five days later, however, some shareholders in the company sued the Funkhouser, Fahy, and others, arguing that they had reneged on a deal to buy them out and further alleging that they were driving the airport into bankruptcy with their profligate spending. As the suit lingered in the courts, Arlington County commissioners stopped the burning of trash at the landfill next to Hoover Field in mid-1932 (but not the one next to Washington Airport).

The improvements at Washington Airport were so significant that in April 1932 the night airmail flight was transferred from Bolling Field to Washington Airport. A month later, in a continuing effort to improve safety, the airport paid local electric power and telephone companies to bury their lines obstructing the landing and take-off lanes. The airport had improved so much that legislation was introduced in Congress to authorize the lease of the airfield as a municipal airport. Washington Airport authorities conditioned their acceptance on the payment of $25,000 a year and the closure of Military Road. They also suggested that Hoover Field be added to the lease. The lease proposal, however, was complicated by the federal government's claim to the Potomac River up to the high-water mark on the Virginia shore. Local small businesses had sold the airport land they claimed to own. But this land had formerly been part of Roaches Run, a creek that emptied into a bay of the same name on the Potomac River. The creek and a large portion of the bay had silted up and turned to dry land after the construction of the Long Bridge in 1903 changed the flow of water, and it was this property which the businesses were built on, and which had been sold to Washington Airport. The Supreme Court's decision in Smoot Sand & Gravel two years earlier did not apply, parties in the dispute said, because the Roaches Run land had been created naturally rather than artificially. But no legislative action was taken, and the government never leased the airport.

== Merger ==
=== First merger effort ===
In June 1928, Funkhouser and Fahy created United States Air Transport as a holding company for Seaboard Airways, Washington Airport, and Funkhouser's other aviation businesses. In March 1929, Funkhouser and Fahy formed Atlantic Seaboard Airways with the intent of taking over International Airways and Hoover Field. Ira C. Eaker was named general manager of Atlantic Seaboard, and for about nine months the two airfields were owned by the same company (although they did not merge into a single field).

United States Air Transport was taken over in June 1929 by Federal Aviation Corporation, an airline based in New York City. Federal Aviation announced it was buying an additional 104 acres (42 ha) (which included the Arlington Beach theme park) for $675,000, with the goal of expanding into a six-runway airport with one runway dedicated solely to departing flights.

But on December 30, 1929, Federal Aviation sold Hoover Field to the New Standard Aircraft Co., ending unified control of the two fields. In July 1931, Federal Aviation was slated to be purchased by National Aviation Corporation, an airline financing corporation originally organized in 1928. This transaction did not occur, but that did not end National Aviation Corp.'s relationship with Washington Airport. Although the two airports were now distinct again, they did enter into a cooperative agreement some time in early 1930. Hoover Field agreed to host all sight-seeing, flight schools, and small planes, while Washington Airport agreed to only be used by larger military, mail, and passenger aircraft.

=== Second merger effort ===
Hoover Field and Washington Airport both suffered significant financial setbacks during the Great Depression. In 1933, both airports merged after a series of quick financial transactions.

Washington Airport was the first to be sold, and the buyers were the Ludingtons. Nicholas S. Ludington and his brother, Charles Townsend Ludington, were co-owners of the Philadelphia Flying Service, a pilot training school and demonstration airplane manufacturer established in 1922. The Ludingtons became quite wealthy, and in 1929 Charles was on the board of directors of the Aviation Corporation—an aviation investment company in which some of the richest men in shipping, railroads, and investment banking had invested. The brothers also were managers of Camden Airport, near Philadelphia. In June 1930, the Ludingtons founded New York-Philadelphia-Washington Airways (soon to be renamed Ludington Airlines), an eastern seaboard airline which famous aviator Amelia Earhart had agreed to join as vice president. The Ludingtons sold their airline to Eastern Air Transport in February 1933, and Eastern Air Transport was in turn acquired by North American Aviation a month later. These transactions left the Ludingtons with plenty of cash. On July 8, 1933, Federal Aviation put Washington Airport up for auction. D.C. attorney H. Rozier Dulany, Jr. (son of the famous Virginia horse breeder) held a $255,000 first mortgage against the property and the Ludingtons held a $160,000 second mortgage, payments on which Washington Airport was unable to make. North American Aviation (the new owner of the former Ludington airline) passed on the chance to buy the property. At auction on July 17, 1933, an unidentified buyer purchased Washington Airport for $432,000.

Hoover Field was sold just days later. New Standard Aircraft Co. had also been unable to make payments on Hoover Field's mortgages by July 1933. The Ludingtons owned a $155,442 first mortgage on Hoover Field, while William Morgan (a D.C. physician) held a second mortgage worth $9,500. The Hoover Field auction was set for July 31. At auction, the Ludingtons bought Hoover Field for $174,500.

The evening after the Hoover Field auction, the secret buyer of Washington Airport emerged: National Airport Corporation, a division of National Aviation Corp. Almost unknown in aviation circles, within 24 hours it purchased Hoover Field from the Ludingtons for an undisclosed sum.

== Washington-Hoover Airport ==
Hoover Field and Washington Airport were merged by their new owner and renamed Washington-Hoover Airport. It opened on August 2, 1933, and closed to the public when Washington National Airport opened on June 16, 1941. It remained open as a private field for small aircraft, but closed on September 16, 1941, when the United States Department of War purchased Washington-Hoover Airport for $1 million to construct The Pentagon.

== Bibliography ==
- American Jurisprudence: A Modern Comprehensive Text Statement of American Law, State and Federal. St. Paul, Minn.: West Group, 1962.
- Arlington Historical Society. Arlington. Charleston, S.C.: Arcadia Publishing, 2000.
- Bednarek, Janet R. Daly. America's Airports: Airfield Development, 1918-1947. College Station, Tex.: Texas A&M University Press, 2001.
- Crouch, Tom D. Wings: A History of Aviation From Kites to the Space Age. Washington, D.C.: Smithsonian National Air and Space Museum, 2004.
- Dailey, Franklyn E. The Triumph of Instrument Flight: A Retrospective in the Century of U.S. Aviation. Wilbraham, Mass.: Dailey International Publishers, 2004.
- Dietrich, Zula. Zula Remembers. Fort Valley, Va.: Loft Press, 2005.
- Evans-Hylton, Patrick. Aviation in Hampton Roads. Charleston, S.C.: Arcadia, 2005.
- Goode, James M. Capital Losses: A Cultural History of Washington's Destroyed Buildings. 2d ed. Washington, D.C.: Smithsonian Institution, 2003.
- Goode, James M. "Flying High: The Origin and Design of Washington National Airport." Washington History. 1:2 (Fall 1989).
- Leuchtenburg, William Edward. Herbert Hoover. New York: Times Books, 2009.
- Peck, Margaret C. Washington Dulles International Airport. Charleston, S.C.: Arcadia Publishing, 2005.
- Schom, Alan. The Eagle and the Rising Sun: The Japanese-American War, 1941-1943, Pearl Harbor Through Guadalcanal. New York: W.W. Norton, 2004.
- Vogel, Steve. The Pentagon: A History. New York: Random House, 2008.
- Walch, Timothy. Uncommon Americans: The Lives and Legacies of Herbert and Lou Henry Hoover. Westport, Conn.: Praeger, 2003.
- Zukowsky, John and Bosma, Koos. Building for Air Travel: Architecture and Design for Commercial Aviation. Munich: Prestel, 1996.
