= Washington–Hoover Airport =

Former aerodrome in Arlington, VA

Coordinates: 38.87°N 77.05°W

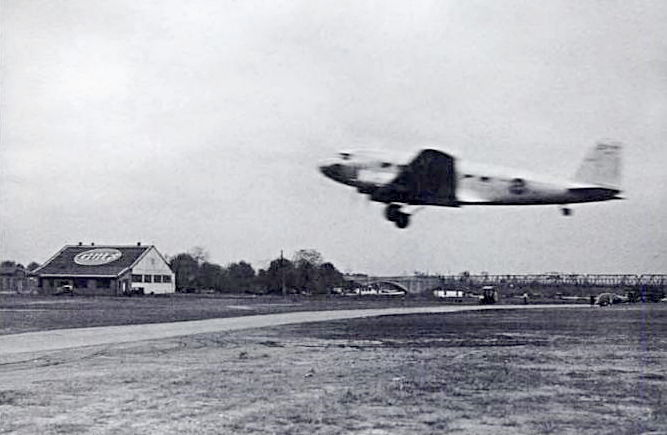
- A DC-2 takes off from Washington–Hoover Airport in 1935, passing over Military Road
- IATA: none; ICAO: none

Summary
- Owner: National Aviation Corporation
- Serves: Washington metropolitan area
- Location: Arlington County, Virginia
- Interactive map of Washington–Hoover Airport

Washington–Hoover Airport was an airport serving the city of Washington, D.C., in the United States from 1933 to 1941. It was created by the merger of Hoover Field and Washington Airport on August 2, 1933. It was in Arlington, Virginia, near the intersection of the Highway Bridge and the Mount Vernon Memorial Highway (where the Pentagon and its parking lots now stand). Washington–Hoover Airport, like its predecessors, suffered from safety problems, short runways, and little room to grow. It closed for public use in June 1941, and the United States Department of War purchased the site in September, closing it for good. Washington National Airport (now known as Ronald Reagan Washington National Airport), which opened in June 1941, was built as its replacement.

== Hoover Field ==
Hoover Field was built in 1925 by Thomas E. Mitten, president of the Philadelphia Rapid Transit Company. It was constructed on Hell's Bottom, a 37.5 acres (15.2 ha) site at the foot of the Highway Bridge in Arlington County, Virginia (formerly a horse racing track) directly across the Potomac River from the city. The single sod runway was 2,400 feet (730 m) long. A single hangar, 60 feet (18 m) by 100 feet (30 m) in size, was constructed. The field was expanded, and the "new" airfield dedicated on July 16, 1926. It was named for then-Secretary of Commerce Herbert Hoover, a major promoter of civil aviation.

Hoover Field suffered from significant safety problems. Arlington Beach, a local amusement park, was northeast of the airport next to the Highway Bridge, and a landfill stood on the north-northwestern edge of the field. The trash in the landfill was also on fire. The smoke sometimes obscured the landing field. The United States Department of Agriculture owned the 400 acres (160 ha) Arlington Experimental Farm immediately adjacent to the northeastern end of the runway. A public swimming pool was located at the airport, and local children would cross the runway to get to it. Safety conditions at the airport were so poor due to these and other obstructions that local businesses and city officials began calling for the construction of a city-owned airport in a safer location just three months after Hoover Field opened.

In February 1927, a group of aviators and aviation companies, led by aviation pioneer Henry Berliner, called for the establishment of a new, larger airport to be built on vacant land across Military Road (the southern boundary of Hoover Field). This plan was not immediately acted on however. In June, Berliner began leasing Hoover Field, and soon took a majority financial interest in the airport. A fire at the field on July 3, 1928, destroyed eight planes and a hangar, causing $100,000 in damages ($1.275 million in 2010 inflation-adjusted dollars). Berliner's finances were significantly damaged by the fire, and he sold his interest in Hoover Field to E. W. Robertson's Mount Vernon Airways on July 20, 1928. By November 1928, a Canadian company, International Airways, had taken over control of the airfield from Mount Vernon Airways.

In early 1929, a new holding company, Atlantic Seaboard Airways, was created by the owners of nearby Washington Airport and took over International Airways and its subsidiary aviation businesses. For a few months, both fields were owned by the same investors (although they never merged operations). On December 30, 1929, a group of investors led by R.H. Reiffen, chairman of the New Standard Aircraft Company, seized control of Atlantic Seaboard Airways and Hoover Field.

Safety at the airfield improved somewhat in mid-1932, after Arlington County commissioners revoked permits for the burning of trash at all landfills in the county—including the one next to Hoover Field, but not the one next to Washington Airport.

== Washington Airport ==
Washington Airport was built because a newly formed airline needed a terminal in Washington, D.C. The new Washington Airport opened without fanfare in late 1927 as a field for sight-seeing planes. Its owners included Robert E. Funkhouser (an investor in various airlines), Herbert Fahy (a well-known Lockheed Aircraft Company test pilot), and other investors. The airport added acreage and improved its facilities, and in February 1928 Funkhouser, Fahy and the others formed Seaboard Airways. Seaboard's base of operations was Washington Airport. But Washington Airport was only marginally safer than Hoover Field. The owners could not afford to pave the runway, and the burning trash dumps near Hoover Field and at Washington Airport's own eastern border often obscured the new field's runways.

The field was dramatically enlarged (and the shoreline of the Potomac River altered) in April 1928. Safety improvements were also made. Arlington Beach amusement park was purchased and razed; three new runways built on the theme park grounds; a new paved runway planned for the existing airport; and a new terminal, hangar, and office building constructed. Arlington County commissioners also banned the burning of trash at the landfill next to Hoover Field in mid-1932 (but not the one next to Washington Airport). In May 1932, the airport paid local electric power and telephone companies to bury their lines obstructing the landing and take-off lanes. But numerous other safety issues remained.

In the summer of 1931, Washington Airport faced a new safety battle. The commission overseeing the construction of Arlington Memorial Bridge proposed erecting two 200 feet (61 m) granite columns on the Virginia side of the bridge as a beautification measure. The columns, however, posed a serious hazard to planes landing at Washington Airport, and an 18-month political and legislative battle ensued before the threat was defeated in February 1932.

== Merger ==
=== First merger effort ===
Washington Airport's owners first attempted to take control of Hoover Field and merge the two entities in the late 1920s. In June 1928, Funkhouser and Fahy created United States Air Transport, a holding company which took over Seaboard Airways, Washington Airport, and Funkhouser's other aviation businesses. In March 1929, Funkhouser and Fahy formed a second, independent company—Atlantic Seaboard Airways—and used it to take over International Airways and Hoover Field. Ira C. Eaker was named general manager of Atlantic Seaboard.

United States Air Transport was itself taken over in June 1929 by Federal Aviation Corporation, an airline based in New York City. Federal Aviation announced it was buying an additional 104 acres (42 ha) for $675,000, with the goal of merging the two airports and creating a six-runway field with one runway dedicated solely to departing flights. But on December 30, 1929, Federal Aviation sold Hoover Field to the New Standard Aircraft Co., ending unified control of the two fields. Nonetheless, beginning around 1930, the two fields entered into a cooperative agreement. Hoover Field agreed to host all sight-seeing, flight schools, and small planes, while Washington Airport agreed to only be used by larger military, mail, and passenger aircraft.

In July 1931, Federal Aviation was slated to be purchased by National Aviation Corporation, an airline financing corporation originally organized in 1928. But this transaction never occurred.

=== Second merger effort ===
Hoover Field and Washington Airport both suffered significant financial setbacks during the Great Depression. In 1933, both airports merged after a series of quick financial transactions.

Washington Airport was the first to be sold, and the buyers were the Ludingtons. Nicholas S. Ludington and his brother, Charles Townsend Ludington, were co-owners of the Philadelphia Flying Service, a pilot training school and demonstration airplane manufacturer established in 1922. The Ludingtons became quite wealthy, and in 1929 Charles was on the board of directors of the Aviation Corporation—an aviation investment company in which some of the richest men in shipping, railroads, and investment banking had invested. In June 1930, the Ludingtons founded New York-Philadelphia-Washington Airways (soon to be renamed Ludington Airlines), an eastern seaboard airline. The Ludingtons sold their airline to Eastern Air Transport in February 1933, and Eastern Air Transport was in turn acquired by North American Aviation a month later. These transactions left the Ludingtons with plenty of cash. On July 8, 1933, Federal Aviation announced it was unable to make payments on its airfield mortgages and put Washington Airport up for auction. D.C. attorney H. Rozier Dulany Jr. (son of the famous Virginia horse breeder) held a $255,000 first mortgage against the property and the Ludingtons held a $160,000 second mortgage. North American Aviation (owner of the former Ludington airline) passed on the chance to buy the property. At auction on July 17, 1933, an unidentified buyer purchased Washington Airport for $432,000.

Hoover Field was sold just days later. New Standard Aircraft Corp. had also had been unable to make good on its mortgages by July 1933. The Ludingtons owned a $155,442 first mortgage on Hoover Field, while William Morgan (a D.C. physician) held a second mortgage worth $9,500. The Hoover Field auction was set for July 31. At auction, the Ludingtons bought Hoover Field for $174,500.

The evening after the Hoover Field auction, the secret buyer of Washington Airport emerged: National Airport Corporation, a division of National Aviation Corporation. Within 24 hours it purchased Hoover Field from the Ludingtons for an undisclosed sum.

== Airlines and destinations ==
American Airlines served Hoover Airport with northbound service to Baltimore, Philadelphia and New York, westbound service to Elkins, Clarksburg, Charleston, Huntington, Cincinnati, Indianapolis and Chicago, and transcontinental service to the Tri-Cities, Knoxville, Nashville, Memphis, Little Rock, Dallas, Fort Worth, Abilene, Big Spring, El Paso, Douglas, Tucson, Phoenix and Los Angeles.

Eastern Airlines also served Baltimore, Philadelphia and New York from Hoover Airport, with southbound service to Miami via Richmond, Raleigh, Charleston, Savannah, Brunswick, Jacksonville, Daytona Beach, Orlando, Vero Beach and West Palm Beach; to Tampa via Richmond, Greensboro, Charlotte, Greenville, Atlanta and Tallahassee; to Houston via Atlanta, Birmingham, Montgomery, Mobile and New Orleans; and to Brownsville, Texas (then one of the primary Latin American terminals of Pan American World Airways) via Atlanta, New Orleans, Houston, San Antonio and Corpus Christi.

Pennsylvania Central Airlines operated flights from Washington to Baltimore, Harrisburg, Pittsburgh, Cleveland, Akron/Canton, Detroit, Lansing, Grand Rapids and Chicago.

== Operation of Washington–Hoover Airport ==
The merged and newly named Washington–Hoover Airport was 143 acres (58 ha) in size and roughly square in size. Its dirt runways were partly oiled to reduce dust, and it had no paved runways. It had no drainage system, partial nighttime lighting, no radio for traffic control, and its three hangars were already considered obsolete.

=== Safety concerns and traffic stoppages on Military Road ===
As soon as the merger was complete, the newly named Washington–Hoover Airport came in for harsh criticism for its dangerous location and other safety concerns. Pilots rated it the most dangerous airport in the nation. Famed aviator Wiley Post declared there were better airstrips in Siberia. Airways Age magazine, then the publication of record for the aviation industry, reported that Hoover-Washington "provided the national capital with probably the poorest aviation ground facilities of any important city in either the United States or Europe." Harold Gatty, "Prince of Navigators" (according to Charles Lindbergh), called it "the worst in the United States in any town of more than 15,000 population. In size, conditions, obstructions, and approach, the field has shortcomings. From the point of view of national dignity, it is a disgrace." He strongly attacked the field's inability to keep the sod runways and taxiing areas properly drained, and said there was no reason why mere rain should close the airport. Major J. Carroll Cone, assistant director for aeronautic development within the U.S. Department of Commerce, said the airport was "the worst in the United States", said it was "admittedly inadequate", and that "its continuing use is out of the question." James C. Edgerton, an aide to the Assistant Secretary of Commerce, said planes were in "imminent danger" when using the field. Amelia Earhart said a month after the merger, "I wouldn't think of flying my own plane here."

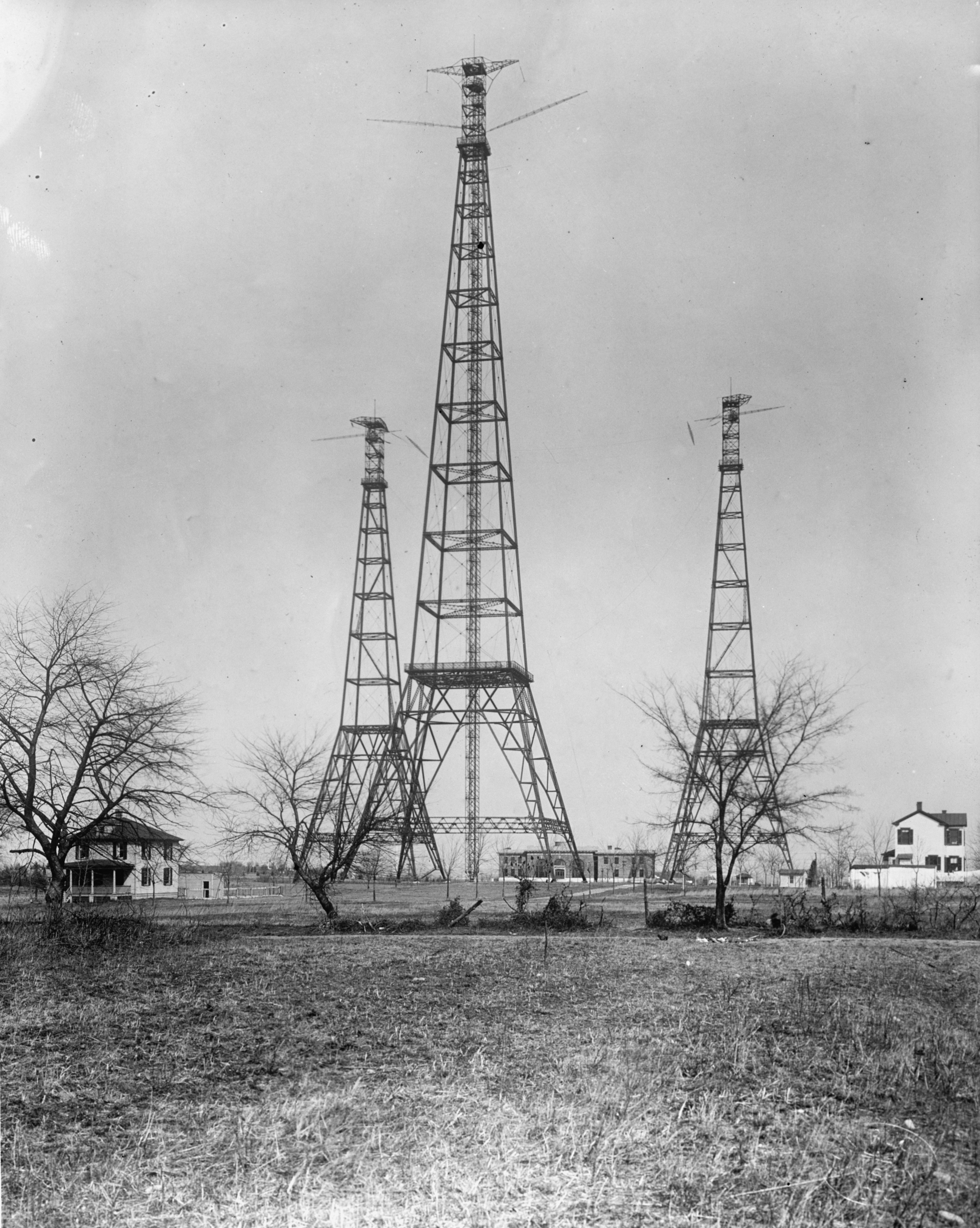
The Arlington Radio Towers, one of the many dangerous safety hazards near the edge of Washington–Hoover

Several safety hazards had been worsened by the joining of the two airfields. Now the field was actually crossed by Military Road. At first, an airport employee tried to stop traffic with a rope when planes landed. When this proved hazardous, the airport tried using guards to stop traffic. The guards also proved ineffective. The airport then installed a traffic light in mid-1934 to prevent vehicles from crossing the runway when planes took off or landed. Arlington County officials fined the airport manager for obstructing traffic, and the light was removed. The presence of the road was not the only hazard. High-tension electrical wires and tall radio towers still lined the field's west side, and a high smokestack and U.S. Route 1 were to its south.

Some safety improvements were made over time, however. Assistant Secretary of Commerce Ewing Y. Mitchell asked the United States Department of War in August 1933 to close Military Road and relocate it, and pledged to seek newly elected President Franklin D. Roosevelt's intervention if this effort failed. The Department of Commerce also undertook legal research to identify any obstacles to the closing of the road. Secretary of War George Dern also supported the road closure. But no closure was made at this time. A land-swap that would give the Arlington Experimental Farm most of the old Hoover Field site while giving Washington–Hoover about 40 acres (16 ha) to the south (thus permitting extension of the runways to a safer length) was proposed in September 1933. The Commission of Fine Arts, the region's most powerful planning body, supported the land-swap as well as closure of Military Road. The land-swap was completed by April 1935, and the airport spent $10,000 widening the runways and building a blimp hangar. Samuel Solomon, a D.C. lawyer, was appointed head of Washington–Hoover Airport in October 1933, and began lobbying heavily for Military Road's closure as well. The Washington Board of Trade threw its weight behind the road closure in March 1934. Arlington County managers said at the same time that they were already planning to move the road. But again, no closure came. Legislation was introduced in Congress in June 1935 to close Military Road, and Arlington County groups began meeting again to determine where the rerouted road would go. But again, no closure was made.

The safety situation at Washington–Hoover was very serious. In 1934, a plane attempting to land nearly hit a military truck traveling along Military Road. In August 1935, a passenger airliner with 14 people aboard had to swerve during take-off to avoid hitting a car on the road. The airliner crashed into a hangar, but no one was killed.

Some other improvements did get made. Two new terminal wings, expanding the building by more than 50 percent, were built in 1934. A new, glass-walled control tower was also built which markedly improved air traffic control, and the Arlington Experimental Farm permitted Washington–Hoover to reclaim several acres of marshy land northwest of the airport to slightly extend the runways. In September 1935, three years of negotiations bore fruit when the Potomac Electric Power Company (Pepco) agreed to move its high-tension electrical lines along Arlington Pike (which hindered the flight path near the northern end of the field).

Although Military Road did not close, Congress passed legislation allowing traffic on the highway to be stopped. On January 31, 1936, Representative John D. Dingell Sr. warned Washington–Hoover Airport that Military Road posed a serious flying hazard. On February 14, airport officials (faced with legal action from Arlington County for obstructing traffic), stopped attempting to close the road using traffic guards, chains, or lights, leading the Department of Commerce to announce it would close the airport if traffic were not stopped. Two days later, the United States Post Office Department declared it would suspend airmail operations at Washington–Hoover unless the road were closed, leading both houses of Congress to introduce legislation demanding closure and realignment of the road. A fight broke out in the United States Senate over payment for the road: Some Senators wanted Washington–Hoover's owners to pay $50,000 in exchange for a quitclaim deed from the War Department. The airport refused, calling this blackmail. Eventually, after several failed compromises, Congress passed and Roosevelt signed federal legislation permitting traffic to be temporarily stopped whenever planes took off or landed, and paying for guards to do the traffic stops.

Washington–Hoover officials quickly announced plans to significantly extend one airport runway across the road, allowing far larger plans to land (and land more safely). But even with the extensions, the runways were too short. The main runway was now 4,200 feet (1,300 m) long, and the secondary runway (also extended) 3,000 feet (910 m), but both were short of the 5,000 feet (1,500 m) considered safe for the new, heavier aircraft (like the Douglas DC-3). Amelia Earhart testified before the U.S. Senate in May 1936 that the airport was still unsafe.

=== Other improvements to facilities and safety ===
The airport continued to expand through the late 1930s, albeit slowly. A new Airmail Building was constructed at the field in August 1936, enabling the Bureau of Air Commerce to move its headquarters to the airport's administration building, and Central Airlines moved its headquarters to the field. A new radio and arc lamp control system for planes began installation later that month, and planning began for paving the runways and taxiing strip. The extended runway over Military Road was laid down in mid-September, the radio control system was finished a few days later, and the new runways completed in late October. A new drainage system helped to keep the field dry during wet weather, and the control tower was also expanded again.

Other efforts through 1937 also helped to improve safety at the field, but only in part. Some high-tension electrical wires and tall trees near the field were removed in December 1936. But in June 1937, Representative Charles Plumley told the House of Representatives that Washington–Hoover was still unsafe for planes and a "national disgrace." A month later the Air Line Pilots Association voted not to fly planes to the airfield due to the safety issues there. Two weeks later, short haul air transport between Washington, D.C., and New York City ended due to the dangers at the airport. Members of Congress proposed legislation paying for improvements to the field, but the Air Line Pilots Association declared the field inherently unsafe and demanded its closure. To address these demands, the Washington Board of Trade urged once again in late July that Military Road be closed (even as local motorists asked that the road be upgraded and repaved).

The House and Senate again introduced airport improvement legislation in July 1937. This bill, which would have provided for construction of a new Military Road and transferred 53 acres (21 ha) of the Arlington Experimental Farm to the airport, was vetoed by President Roosevelt. But as this legislation was moving forward, Arlington County and Washington–Hoover Airport reached an agreement in mid-August whereby the county would close Military Road in exchange for a $25,000 payment to help pay for its rerouting. The House of Representatives passed legislation the following day to permit closure of the federal road. The Senate followed suit 10 days later. Again President Roosevelt vetoed the legislation, arguing that it turned federal property over to a private entity without payment in return. In September, the Bureau of Air Commerce directed all airports in the United States to assume responsibility for directing the take-off and landing of large air transport planes. But Washington–Hoover personnel refused to take on that responsibility, due to the airfield's poor radio and lighting systems. After negotiations among the Air Line Pilots Association, the Bureau of Air Commerce, transport airlines, and the airport, tighter rules for large air transport craft were adopted but special provisions enacted just for Washington–Hoover which established a slightly lower threshold of safety and permitted large air transport ships to land at the airfield. But still the Air Line Pilots Association pressed for the complete closure of Washington–Hoover.

== Push for federalization and boundary issues ==
Throughout this period, efforts were also made to have the city or federal government purchase Washington–Hoover. In late 1933, the city asked the Public Works Administration to purchase the airport, but the agency refused (citing the high cost of land). Despite this setback, some city and federal leaders kept pushing for Washington–Hoover as the city's municipal airport. Arlington County officials opposed the proposal, however, as the private airport generated tax revenues it would not if it were a federal facility.

One of the reasons why purchase was opposed was the boundary question. In April 1933, a filling station near Washington Airport refused to pay taxes to the state of Virginia, arguing that the land on which it stood was part of the District of Columbia. Despite the Supreme Court's earlier ruling, this claim threw into question where the border really was.

In an attempt to fix the border permanently, Congress enacted legislation on March 21, 1934, creating the District of Columbia-Virginia Boundary Commission. For the next 20 months, the Boundary Commission held hearings and studied ancient maps to determine whether the low tide or high tide level of the Potomac River constituted Virginia's boundary with the District of Columbia. In December 1935, the Boundary Commission issued a compromise report, giving the federal government (which represented the District) title to all land east of the Mount Vernon Memorial Highway. This compromise would have given Washington–Hoover Airport to the state of Virginia while giving nearby Gravelly Point to the federal government.

But a major congressional battle over the report led to no action, and the dispute continued to simmer. Finally, in October 1945, Congress enacted legislation essentially enacting the recommendations of the Boundary Commission report, but giving title over National Airport to the federal government (with some caveats for law enforcement).

== Closing of Military Road and approval of Washington National Airport ==
The rapid expansion in aircraft size and weight as well as the need for enhanced airfield safety led the U.S. Department of Commerce to threaten to close Washington–Hoover again. In June 1937, the department promulgated new rules requiring runways to be lengthened by as much as 2,000 feet (610 m) and for all obstructions for take-off and landing flight paths to be removed. The department also instituted an airport classification system designed to rate fields on safety and other factors. Aircraft would be permitted to use only at those fields which had a rating indicating it was safe for them, and air traffic volumes would be limited at fields with lower ratings. The rules threatened to close Washington–Hoover, or permit its use for local traffic only.

In early September, the War Department agreed to allow planes to land at Bolling Field in an emergency. This led the Air Line Pilots Association to cancel its boycott of Washington–Hoover. But shortly thereafter, the association renewed its push to have the airport closed altogether. Under intense pressure, the National Aviation Corporation said it was putting Washington–Hoover Airport up for sale. Airport officials later said they hoped that the federal government would take over Washington–Hoover, greatly expand it, and operate it as a joint public-private enterprise with National Aviation. Two months later, Washington–Hoover officials announced that the blimp hangar at the field was being closed and removed. The airfield also proposed filling in part of the lagoon that formed the southern end of Boundary Channel, so that a much-needed, much longer cross-runway could be built at the field.

One important improvement at Washington–Hoover Airport went almost unnoticed, but proved historic. J. Willard Marriott, noticing the many passengers at Washington–Hoover Airport without access to food, opened the world's first airline catering business there in 1937.

=== Closure of Military Road ===
The year 1938 saw the closure at last of Military Road. For six months, the Department of Commerce's new rules had threatened to close the airport, but neither airport officials nor the federal government had acted to improve the safety situation. But pressure for closure began to build again. In early 1938, federal aviation officials began regulating air traffic in the D.C. area to prevent too many planes from using the field at once. In February, highly influential Time magazine called Washington–Hoover "one of the world's most dangerous" airports. Representative Charles Albert Plumley castigated the airfield as "both a public menace and a national disgrace."

The national publicity given to the airport's problems led to action. This time, Congress adopted a different legislative strategy. In late March, the Senate approved two bills (rather than a single bill), one to close Military Road and one to expand the airport by transferring a portion of the Arlington Experimental Farm to the facility. The House passed both bills in early April. President Roosevelt signed the bill closing Military Road on April 14. Washington–Hoover officials immediately announced a plan to secure an additional 110 acres (45 ha) of land and build five runways about 5,000 feet (1,500 m) long. The airport tendered its $25,000 payment to the county in late April. Military Road closed on Monday, May 15, 1938. In mid-September hearings began to set a date for the final removal of the blimp hangar.

The March 1939 Official Aviation Guide shows 41 weekday airline departures: 24 Eastern (including 11 nonstops to Newark), 9 American and 8 Pennsylvania Central.

=== Washington National Airport ===
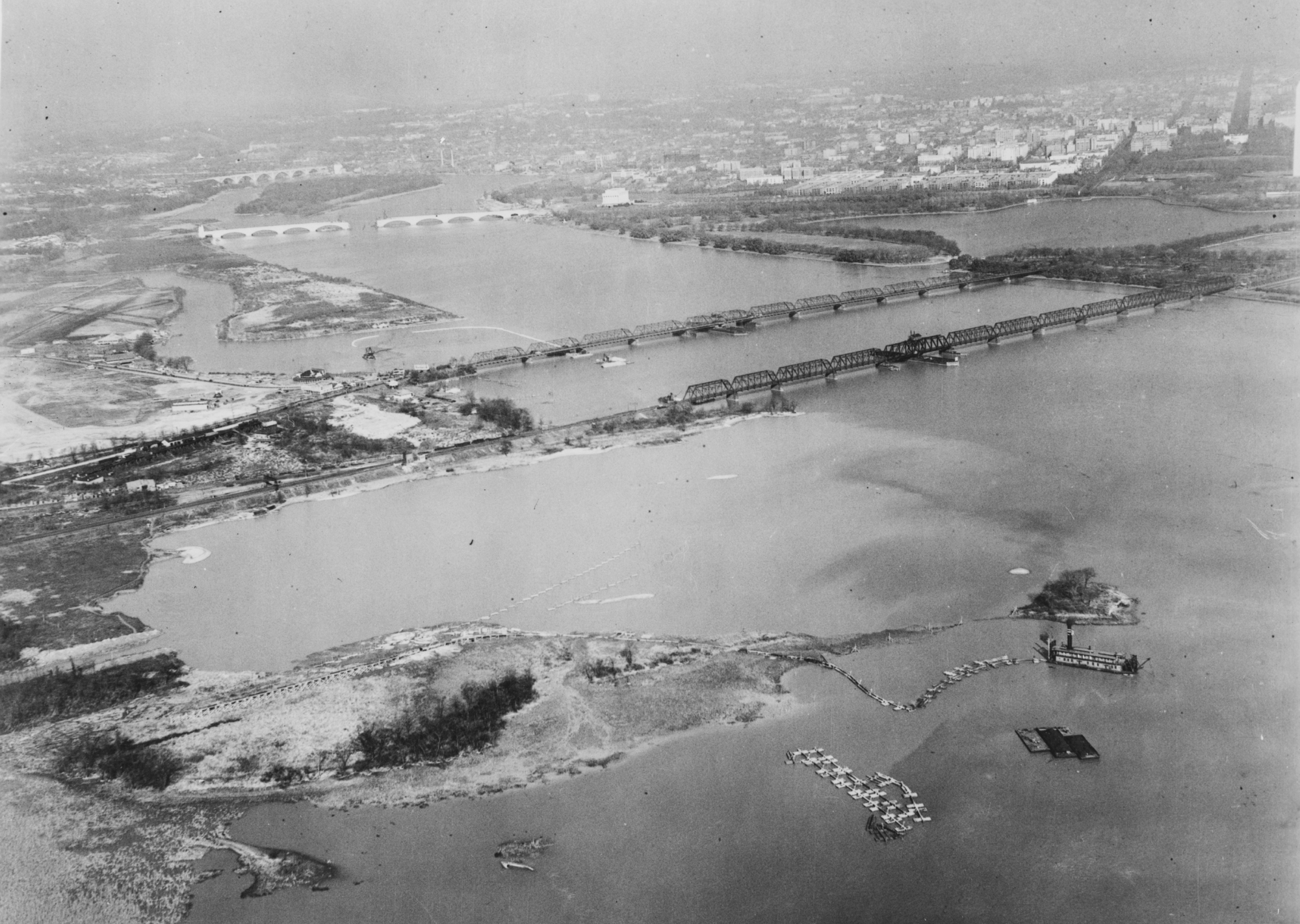
Gravelly Point in 1930, with a dredging ship. The runways of Washington–Hoover can be seen in the middle left of the photograph.

But in a surprise move, President Roosevelt announced on September 28, 1938, that a new 750 acres (300 ha) airport would be built on existing and reclaimed land at Gravelly Point. Roosevelt, worried that war in Europe and Asia was looming, became convinced that a new, modern, safe facility was needed for national defense reasons. These concerns led the President to select Gravelly Point for a new National Airport. Roosevelt approved the expenditure of $9 million in Public Works Administration funds, $2 million in Works Progress Administration funds, and $200,000 of Civil Aviation Administration funds to build the airport, whose construction was to begin in early November 1938.

Roosevelt's decision had been nearly two years in the making. Roosevelt had long favored closure of Washington–Hoover and the construction of a new, large, modern airport at a safer location. But Roosevelt faced a problem: The Air Commerce Act of 1926 barred the federal government from building or supplying the funds to build commercial airports. However, pressure for substantial reform of federal air commerce policy was rising, so in August 1937 (around the time he vetoed the road closing bills) Roosevelt formed an advisory panel to make recommendations regarding reform of national civil aviation policy. Both the Roosevelt administration and several members of Congress introduced air commerce legislation in January 1938, and on May 28, 1938, Roosevelt signed the Civil Aeronautics Act into law. The statute established the Civil Aeronautics Authority, and permitted this agency to spend federal funds for the construction of airports if such construction was required by the national defense.

It was under this authority that Roosevelt acted to authorize the construction of National Airport (for years, the only commercial airport operated by the U.S. government). The closure of Military Road kept Washington–Hoover open while Roosevelt pursued his civil aviation bill and built his new airport.

Over the next two years, a number of improvements were made to the area around Washington–Hoover Airport. Few of these were intended to make the airport safer, but rather to make it safe for the new National Airport and to prepare the area for the construction of military facilities (as mobilization was under way in anticipation of World War II). The blimp hangar was gone as of November 1939, although the Goodyear Blimp continued to dock at Washington–Hoover. In October 1940, Congress passed legislation transferring the Arlington Experimental Farm to the United States Army, and authorizing the purchase of Washington–Hoover by the federal government. The Arlington Radio Towers, built around 1915 and long a hazard to planes at Washington–Hoover, were removed in early 1941. With the closure of Washington–Hoover clearly coming, Samuel Solomon resigned as Washington–Hoover's manager in May 1941 to become president of Northeast Airlines.

== Closure ==
Washington–Hoover Airport closed as a public use airport in 1941 when Washington National Airport opened on June 16, 1941. After transfer of passenger and air transport flights to National, Washington–Hoover was used as a private field by a pilot training school.

In late June 1941, the Army selected Washington–Hoover for the site of a proposed $3 million supply depot. The supply depot was never built; instead, The Pentagon was constructed on the site of the old airfield. In June 1941, Congress finally appropriated money for the purchase of the airfield for military use. On September 16, 1941, the War Department bought Washington–Hoover Airport for $1 million for construction of The Pentagon.

The Goodyear Blimp moved to National Airport in November 1941. Ground was broken for the construction of The Pentagon on November 8, 1941, and Washington–Hoover ceased to exist.

== Bibliography ==
- American Jurisprudence: A Modern Comprehensive Text Statement of American Law, State and Federal. St. Paul, Minn.: West Group, 1962.
- Arlington Historical Society. Arlington. Charleston, S.C.: Arcadia Publishing, 2000.
- Baskas, Harriet. Stuck at the Airport: A Traveler's Survival Guide. New York: Fireside Books, 2001.
- Bednarek, Janet R. Daly. America's Airports: Airfield Development, 1918-1947. College Station, Tex.: Texas A&M University Press, 2001.
- Bell, Chip R. and Patterson, John R. Take Their Breath Away: How Imaginative Service Creates Devoted Customers. Hoboken, N.J.: Wiley, 2009.
- Botti, Timothy J. Envy of the World: A History of the U.S. Economy and Big Business. New York: Algora Publishing, 2006.
- Brendon, Piers. The Dark Valley: A Panorama of the 1930s. New York: Knopf, 2000.
- Budianksy, Stephen. Battle Of Wits: The Complete Story of Codebreaking in World War II. New York: The Free Press, 2000.
- Carroll, James. Crusade: Chronicles of an Unjust War. New York: Henry Holt, 2004.
- Crouch, Tom D. Wings: A History of Aviation From Kites to the Space Age. Washington, D.C.: Smithsonian National Air and Space Museum, 2004.
- Dietrich, Zula. Zula Remembers. Fort Valley, Va.: Loft Press, 2005.
- Evans-Hylton, Patrick. Aviation in Hampton Roads. Charleston, S.C.: Arcadia, 2005.
- Fitzhugh, Richard. "Bomber Crew." In Bomber Command: American Bombers in Original World War II Color. Jeffrey Ethell, ed. Osceola, Wisc.: MBI/Sparkford/Haynes, 2003.
- Goode, James M. Capital Losses: A Cultural History of Washington's Destroyed Buildings. 2d ed. Washington, D.C.: Smithsonian Institution, 2003.
- Goode, James M. "Flying High: The Origin and Design of Washington National Airport." Washington History. 1:2 (Fall 1989).
- Gordon, Alastair. Naked Airport: A Cultural History of the World's Most Revolutionary Structure. Chicago: University of Chicago Press, 2008.
- Hardaway, Robert M. Airport Regulation, Law, and Public Policy: The Management and Growth of Infrastructure. New York: Quorum Books, 1991.
- Horonjeff, Robert and MacKelvey, Francis X. Planning and Design of Airports. London: McGraw-Hill Publishing, 2009.
- Lebow, Eileen F. Before Amelia: Women Pilots in the Early Days of Aviation. Washington, D.C.: Brassey's, 2002.
- Leuchtenburg, William Edward. Herbert Hoover. New York: Times Books, 2009.
- McQuaid, Kim. Uneasy Partners: Big Business in American Politics, 1945-1990. Baltimore, Md.: Johns Hopkins University Press, 1994.
- Peck, Margaret C. Washington Dulles International Airport. Charleston, S.C.: Arcadia Publishing, 2005.
- Schom, Alan. The Eagle and the Rising Sun: The Japanese-American War, 1941-1943, Pearl Harbor Through Guadalcanal. New York: W.W. Norton, 2004.
- Swaim, Robert W. The Strategic Drucker: Growth Strategies and Marketing Insights From the Works of Peter Drucker. Singapore: Wiley, 2010.
- Vogel, Steve. The Pentagon: A History. New York: Random House, 2008.
- Walch, Timothy. Uncommon Americans: The Lives and Legacies of Herbert and Lou Henry Hoover. Westport, Conn.: Praeger, 2003.
- Wood, John Walter. Airports: Some Elements of Design and Future Development. New York: Coward-McCann, 1940.
- Zukowsky, John and Bosma, Koos. Building for Air Travel: Architecture and Design for Commercial Aviation. Munich: Prestel, 1996.
