= Ludington House =

Ludington House may refer to:

- Val Verde (Santa Barbara, California), also known as the "Wright Ludington House", a historic estate in Montecito, California, U.S.
- Ludington House (Lawrence, Kansas), a National Register of Historic Places listing in Douglas County, Kansas, U.S.
- Ludington House, a historic building in Ottawa, Kansas, U.S.
- House of Ludington, a hotel (1864−2025) in the Escanaba Central Historic District in Escanaba, Michigan, U.S.
- Ludington House, an 1878 house built by Antoine Ephrem Cartier in Ludington, Michigan, U.S.
