= Wright S. Ludington =

American art collector

Wright Saltus Ludington (1900–1992) was an art collector, artist and one of the founding members of the Santa Barbara Museum of Art.

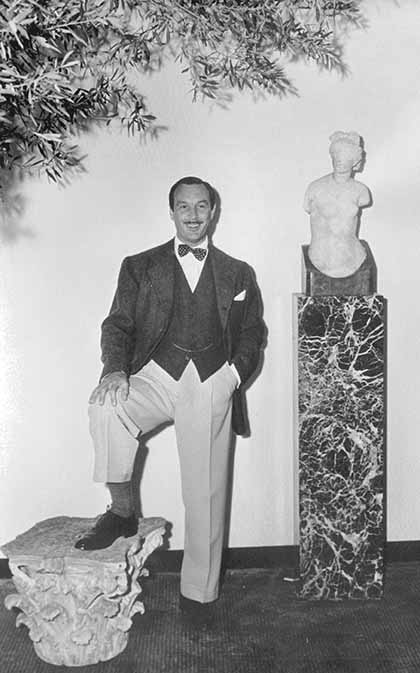
Ludington in Court 1941 Opening Reception Cropped

== Early life and education ==
Wright Saltus Ludington was born in New York City on June 10, 1900, to Charles and Ethel Ludington. He had two brothers: Charles Townsend Ludington, who was born in New York City in 1896, and Nicholas Saltus Ludington, born in Bryn Mawr in 1904.

Ludington was exposed to art at an early age - his aunt Katharine Ludington was an accomplished portrait painter, his mother was a collector of impressionist paintings and his father was a collector of pre-Columbian and Asian art. He attended the preparatory boarding Groton School in northern Massachusetts before moving to Santa Barbara with his family where he attended the Thacher School in Ojai, California. It was here that he first met Lockwood de Forest Jr., who would go on to become a renowned landscape architect and lifelong friend of Ludington who would also design the gardens at his estate, Val Verde, located in Montecito, California. After his time at Thacher, Ludington went to Yale to study architecture; however, after one year he dropped out to pursue the study of art. He enrolled at the Pennsylvania Academy of Fine Arts and later the Art Student League in New York but his studies were interrupted with the death of his mother in 1922.

== Mid-life and philanthropy ==
At the request of his father and possibly as a distraction from his grief over his mother, Ludington was sent on a “grand tour” of Europe and was accompanied by his good friend Lockwood de Forest. Ludington and de Forest particularly spent a great deal of time in Italy and Paris – visiting the ancient Roman sites that likely influenced the gardens and landscaping at Ludington's first home, Val Verde. In 1927, after the death of his father, Ludington officially settled in Santa Barbara in his inherited estate Dias Felices, which Ludington rechristened Val Verde. It is said that the gardens and the reflecting pools at this home were loosely adapted from features found at Roman Emperor Hadrian's Villa at Tivoli. A pinnacle of Lockwood de Forest's achievements, the gardens at Val Verde completed in the late 1920s have since been designated a national treasure by the American Society of Landscape Architects as well as a national, state, and county landmark. A few years later Ludington would acquire the statuary that once adorned that 2nd century villa including the Lansdowne Hermes and Lansdowne Dionysus (once part of the 18th-century London collection of the Marquess of Lansdowne) and now in the permanent collection of the Santa Barbara Museum of Art. It was also during Ludington's grand tour that his collection of art commenced with the purchase of early 20th century modernists, including his first purchase, a small portrait by André Derain in 1924 as well as a still-life oil painting by Georges Braque, bequeathed to the museums' permanent collection in 1993. Through his collecting activity, Ludington developed relationships with Alfred Stieglitz, Georgia O'Keeffe, Gaston Lachaise, and Graham Sutherland, among others. He was an early collector of both British and West Coast modernism; of the latter, he said "My evident interest in a number of West Coast artists...is not at all chauvinistic. I believe that the best artists out here are as good as any in New York."

In 1938, Ludington began construction on another stately home in Palm Springs, which featured a Roman bath.

Given his interest in the arts and his already impressive and growing collection, Ludington was instrumental in the formation of the Santa Barbara Museum of Art. After the old post office was purchased from the Federal Government, the Museum Association was formed in 1940 where Ludington was part of the building committee, responsible for hiring the renowned Chicago architect, David Adler, to remodel the post office into a museum. As a memorial to his father, Ludington donated funds to convert the original lobby of the post office into a sculpture court of classical Roman and Greek pieces, The Charles Henry Ludington Court. Ludington also served as the museum's first vice president, a position he shared with fellow philanthropist Katharine McCormick. After his service in World War II teaching camouflage painting to the troops, Ludington continued to take on leadership roles at the museum, first commissioning de Forest to redesign the landscaping, and later becoming the institution's president in 1951. After the untimely death of the museum's first director, Donald Bear, Ludington hired one of the first woman art museum directors in the country, Ala Story. Throughout his 50-year involvement with the museum as a donor, board member, and president, Ludington donated nearly 400 objects to the museum's permanent collection.

Among Ludington's vibrant social circle in Santa Barbara was actress Judith Anderson, with whom he was quite close and often socialized along with Ala Story and her partner Margaret Mallory.

Ludington hired architect Lutah Maria Riggs to further remodel Val Verde in 1952, and when that was finished, kept her on to design his second home in Montecito, which he named Hesperides, and later engaged her to design his third home in the area, October Hill, in the 1970s.

UCLA staged a major exhibition of Ludington's collection in 1964, which art critic Henry J. Seldis credited with bringing Ludington's philanthropy and collecting activity to the attention of a wider audience. Hollywood costume designer Orry-Kelly frequently stayed at Ludington's home with screenwriter John Colton in the 1940s; in his memoir, Kelly remarked that at the time, Ludington and former Harper's Bazaar Paris editor Louise Macy "had a crush on each other," but other sources either allude to or explicitly state that Ludington was homosexual.

By 1975, Ludington was increasingly reclusive; an article in Travel & Leisure magazine by Brian Moore highlighted the importance of his collection but noted that Ludington was "a reticent man" who "shuns interviews."
