= Farman Sport =

FF 65 Sport
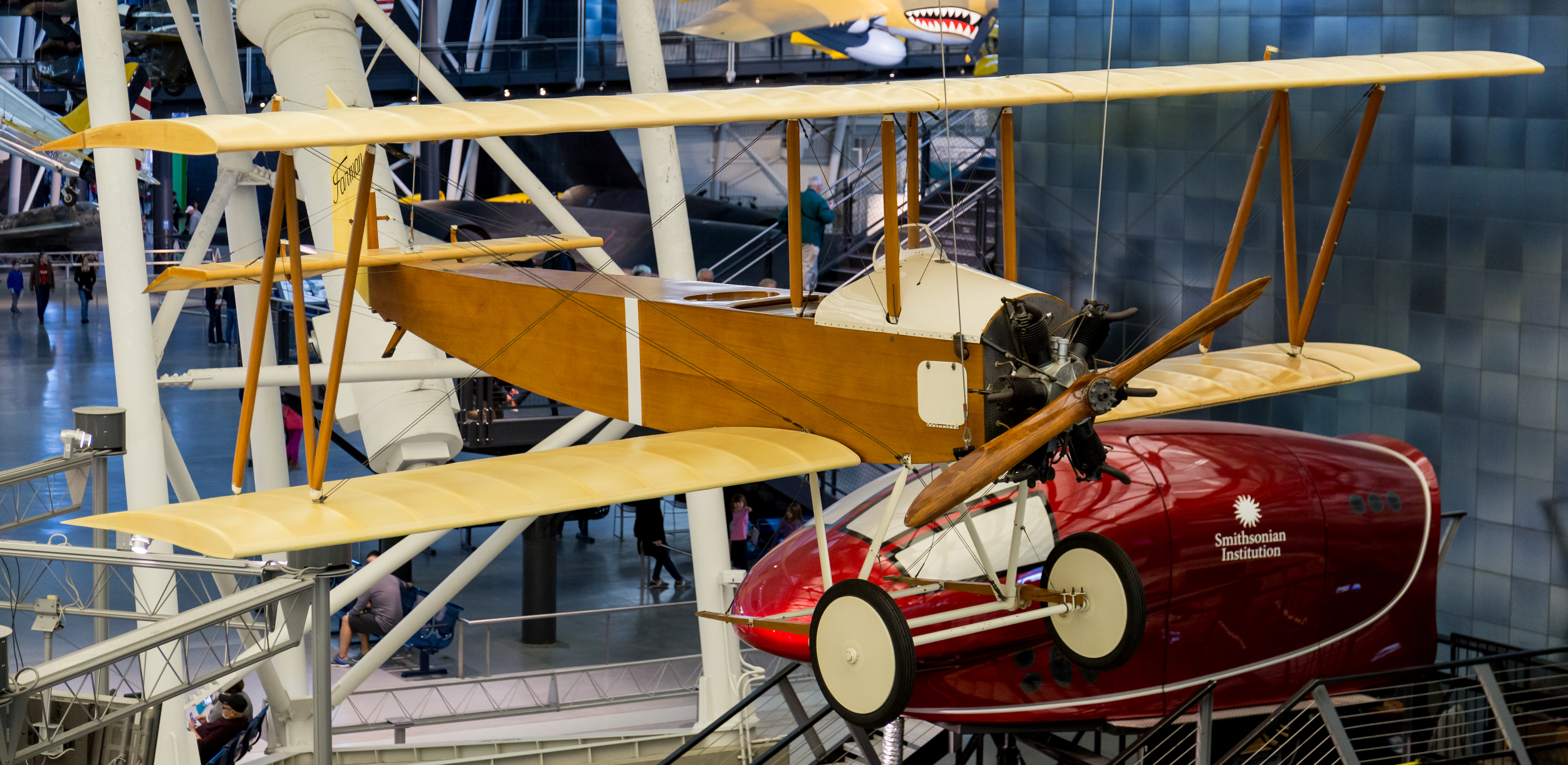
- Farman Sport at the Udvar Hazy Center

General information
- Type: Sport tourer
- National origin: France
- Manufacturer: Farman Brothers
- Number built: 34 production +2? prototypes

History
- First flight: 1919

The Farman FF 65 Sport is a French built light biplane, with a single engine and tandem seats, intended for sport and touring. First flown in 1919, it achieved modest sales at home and abroad in the early 1920s. Two unusual modifications produced a biplane glider and a low aspect ratio parasol wing machine.

== Design and development ==
Generally known as the Sport, Farman's post World War I light biplane tourer carried the maker's designation FF 65. FF stood for Farman fréres and the FF 65 was one of only two Farman aircraft to use it; it distinguished the Sport from the F 65, its very large airliner contemporary, one of the Farman Goliath series. The prototype was named the David to contrast this small aircraft with the Goliath and this name is sometimes used for the type.

The Sport was a single bay biplane with staggered wings of equal span and rectangular plan. There were outboard ailerons on the upper planes only. The interplane struts were of N-shape and the centre section was supported by two pairs of vertical struts from the fuselage. The fuselage was a rectangular structure with four longerons interconnected by vertical and diagonal braces skinned in 3-ply wood. An open cockpit began just aft of the first pair of centre section struts, with two low seats in tandem, spaced so closely together that the passenger's feet surrounded the pilot. At the rear, the tailplane was attached to the top of the fuselage and wire braced to the rudder post. This latter carried a tall rudder with a curved top which extended to the bottom of the fuselage, moving in a gap between the elevators; there was no fixed fin. It had a fixed conventional undercarriage, with its main wheels on a single axle mounted on V struts to the lower longerons.

David was powered by a 60 hp (45 kW) Le Rhône 9Z rotary engine, neatly enclosed within an aluminium cowling and driving a two blade propeller. It underwent official testing early in 1920 at Villacoublay. Sports fitted with extended upper wings gained first and second prizes at a speed range competition that year. The production version, first displayed in September 1921 in Brussels, gained its certificate that December. It was powered by an 80 hp (60 kW) Anzani 6Bbis two row radial. This engine was fitted with its cylinder heads exposed for cooling.

In 1922 the Sport was modified to compete in the first French national gliding competition. Modifications had to be made to accommodate the change in centre of gravity once the engine had been removed and the unusual biplane glider had a lengthened nose and wings without stagger, the upper plane moved rearwards. The wing span was increased by 2.69 m (8 ft 10 in) and the N-form interplane struts were replaced by parallel pairs.

Another seriously modified Sport appeared in 1926 when Farman fitted a F 65 with a new, monoplane parasol wing. This rectangular plan wing, with a span of 8 m (26 ft) and a chord of 3.065 m (10.06 ft) was built out a portion of the wing of a Goliath airliner. The original Sport centre section struts were retained but new streamlined lift struts, two on each side, took the forces from the high wing to the lower fuselage longerons. Because of the low aspect ratio of its wing (2.6) the new machine acquired the nickname the Flying Postcard. Formally, it remained a Sport. It was designed for, and entered into, the Zenith Cup fuel consumption competition of 1926. Farman did win this Cup, though not with the Sport but with their F.91.

The Farman F 209 began as a Sport which had been in the Farman store from 1924 to 1931. When it finally flew again in 1933 its structure had been revised and modified, though details are sparse. There were no changes to the major dimensions.

== Operational history ==
34 production aircraft were built, several of which were exported. Wallace Kennett established a US agency in Kansas City and imported about 10 Sports. Others were sold into Canada, Australia and Spain.

The Sport took part in several competitions to promote the brand. It had an early success in Brussels in September 1921, where Bossoutrot won the Simonet Cup. In May 1922 he was at Le Bourget and was runner-up in the "quick getaway" competition. A Sport was present, if not competing at the 1923 St Louis Air Race Meeting and another took part in the 1924 "On to Dayton" race, which involved flying over the Allegheny Mountains.

In August 1922 the first national French glider meeting, the Congrės expérimental d'aviation sans moteur, organised by the Association of French Flyers (AFF) and partly government funded, was held in Combegrasse, Puy-de-Dôme. Farman entered two aircraft, the de-motorised Sport and an Aviette glider; overall there were 17 contestants. The Sport was much less successful than the Aviette, making only a few take-offs.

Charles Townsend Ludington used a Farman Sport airplane for demonstration aerial displays in the 1920s.

== Variants ==
David
Original, Le Rhône powered aircraft.
Sport
Production aircraft, Anzani engine.
Sport glider
Glider version for the Combegrasse competition.
Sport parasol
Parasol winged aircraft for the Zenith competition.
F 209
1933 structurally modified machine.

== Aircraft on display ==
A Sport is on display in the National Air and Space Museum in the USA. It is the one which took part in the "On to Dayton" race in 1924 and has a modified undercarriage with coupled wheels and skids.

== Specifications (Le Rhône engine) ==
Data from Les Avions Farman

General characteristics

- Capacity: 2
- Length: 6.13 m (20 ft 1 in)
- Wingspan: 7.11 m (23 ft 4 in)
- Height: 2.47 m (8 ft 1 in)
- Wing area: 19.66 m^{2} (211.6 sq ft)
- Empty weight: 220 kg (485 lb)
- Gross weight: 420 kg (926 lb)
- Powerplant: 1 × le Rhône 9Z 9-cylinder rotary, 45 kW (60 hp)

Performance

- Maximum speed: 140 km/h (87 mph, 76 kn)
- Stall speed: 50 km/h (31 mph, 27 kn)
- Range: 190 km (120 mi, 100 nmi)
- Service ceiling: 4,000 m (13,000 ft)
- Rate of climb: 2.44 m/s (480 ft/min) to 2,000 m (6,560 ft)

== Sources ==
- Liron, Jean (1984). Les avions Farman. Collection Docavia. Vol. 21. Paris: Éditions Larivière. OCLC 37146471.
- Trimble, William F. (15 June 1982). High Frontier. University of Pittsburgh Pre. p. 120. ISBN 978-0-8229-7426-0.
- Hirschauer, Louis; Dollfus, Charles, eds. (1920). L'Année Aéronautique: 1919-1920. Paris: Dunod. p. 18.
- Hirschauer, Louis; Dollfus, Charles, eds. (1921). L'Année Aéronautique: 1920-1921. Paris: Dunod. p. 25.
