= Val Verde (Montecito, California) =

- U.S. National Register of Historic Places
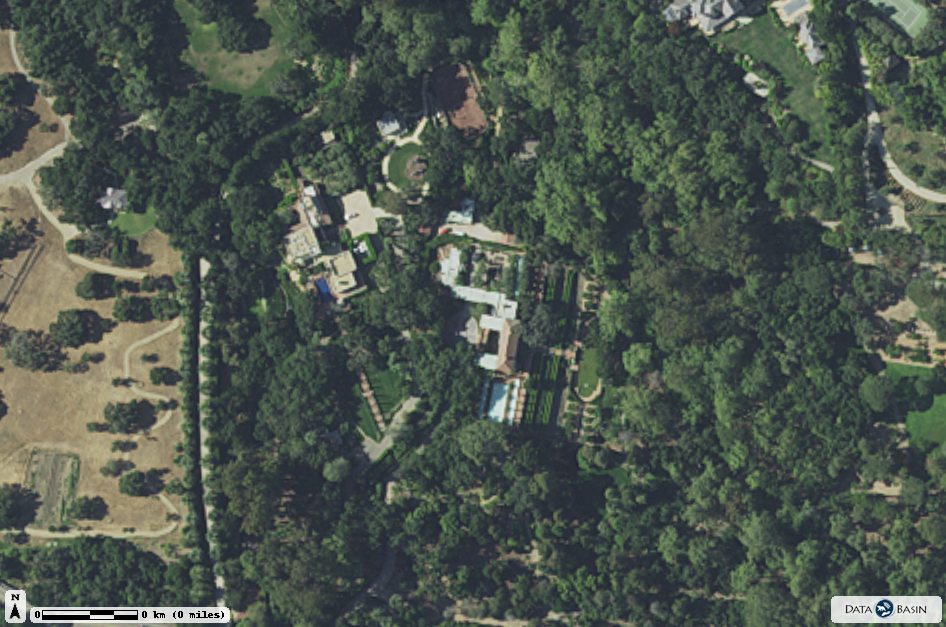
- Portion of the Val Verde estate via aerial photograph.

- Location within California
- Location: 2549 Sycamore Canyon Rd., Santa Barbara, California
- Coordinates: 34°26′24″N 119°38′55″W
- Area: 8.9 acres (3.6 ha)
- Built: 1918, c.1926
- Architect: Bertram G. Goodhue; Lockwood de Forest
- Architectural style: Mission/spanish Revival
- NRHP reference No.: 95000359
- Added to NRHP: March 31, 1995

Val Verde, in Montecito, California, also known as the Wright Ludington House, is an estate which was listed on the National Register of Historic Places in 1995. The listing included five contributing buildings, 10 contributing structures, four contributing objects, and a contributing site, on 8.9 acres (3.6 ha).

It is located at 2549 Sycamore Canyon Road in Montecito, which is adjacent to Santa Barbara.

The house, built in 1918, is a two-story Mediterranean Revival style house, built of hollow clay tile and covered with a red-tiled hipped roof, arranged around an open courtyard patio. It was designed by architect Bertram G. Goodhue for fellow New Yorker Henry Dater Jr.

The property was bought by Charles Ludington in 1925, after which Ludington, with architect Lockwood de Forest added landscaping, cottages, garages, an undulating wall, and a Spanish fountain around 1926. The property was inherited by his son Wright S. Ludington in 1929 or 1930.

In 2009, the property was sold to Sergey Grishin (businessman).

It has also been known as Dias Felices, as the Henry Dater house, and as the Dr. Warren Austin home.

It was deemed significant as a "product of the opulent age in Montecito, California, from 1900-1920 when the rural town became noted for its substantial winter homes based on European residential models, commissioned by wealthy easterners and midwesterners from well-known national and regional architects."
