= Ludington Airline =

American airline (1929–1933)

Ludington Lines
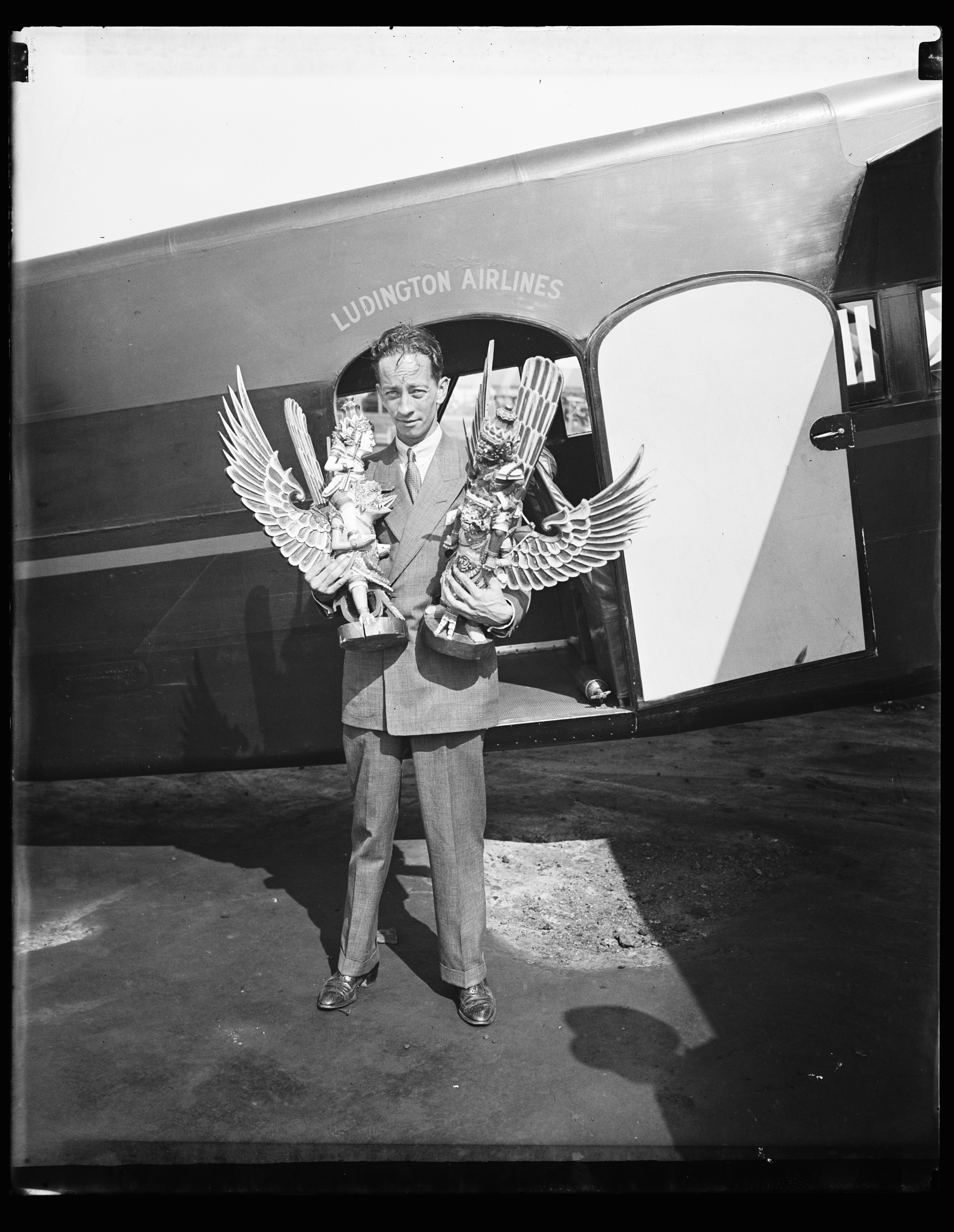
- Film Director Charles Tillyer Trego standing in front of a Ludington plane
- Founded: 1929; 96 years ago
- Ceased operations: 1933; 92 years ago
- Focus cities: New York City; Washington, D.C.
- Fleet size: 7 Stinson tri-motor
- Destinations: New England states
- Headquarters: Philadelphia
- Key people: C.T. Ludington; Amelia Earhart

Ludington Airline (also, Ludington Lines or Ludington Line) was an airline in the northeastern United States begun in 1929 with an investment of at least $1 million (equivalent to $18 million in 2024) from Charles Townsend Ludington and his brother Nicholas.

In its first year, the airline reportedly had 66,000 passengers and a profit of $8,000 ($151,000). Pennsylvania Railroad handled Ludington ticketing and allowed buses for transfers at New York Penn Station. Ludington brochures advertised "Plane Service, like Train Service" as their mode of operation.

With increased competition (including pending mergers), a reorganization of leadership, and government pressure toward airline monopolization, Ludington sold to Eastern Air Transport in 1933.
