= Camden County Airport =

Airport in New Jersey, United States

- IATA: none; ICAO: none; FAA LID: 19N

Summary
- Airport type: Public use
- Owner: Albion Airport, Inc.
- Serves: Berlin, New Jersey
- Location: Camden County
- Elevation AMSL: 150 ft (46 m)
- Coordinates: 39°46′42″N 074°56′52″W

Map
- Interactive map of Camden County Airport

Runways
Direction	Length		Surface
Direction	ft	m	Surface
5/23	3,094	943	Asphalt

Statistics (2022)
- Aircraft operations: 5,725
- Based aircraft: 26
- Source: Federal Aviation Administration

Camden County Airport (FAA LID: 19N) also known as Pine Valley Airport, is a privately owned, public use airport in Camden County, New Jersey, United States. It is located one nautical mile (2 km) southwest of the central business district of Berlin, New Jersey. The airport was established in March 1929.

== Facilities and aircraft ==
Camden County Airport covers an area of 75 acres (30 ha) at an elevation of 150 feet (46 m) above mean sea level. It has one runway designated 5/23 with an asphalt surface measuring 3,094 by 45 feet (943 x 14 m).

For the 12-month period ending December 31, 2022, the airport had 5,725 general aviation aircraft operations, an average of 110 per week. At that time there were 26 aircraft based at this airport, 25 single-engine, and 1 ultra-light.

== See also ==
- List of airports in New Jersey
