= Jeffrey Ethell =

American aviation author and pilot (1947–1997)

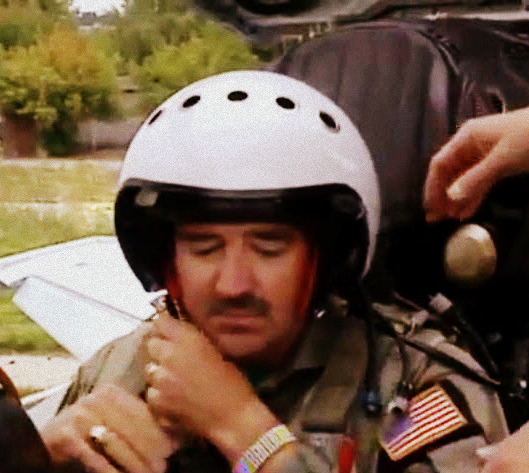
Jeffrey Ethell, call sign "Fighter Writer"

Jeffrey Ethell (1947– 6 June 1997) was an American aviation author and pilot who wrote extensively on aviation and military matters. He was killed on June 6, 1997, when the restored P-38 Lightning he was flying crashed at Tillamook, Oregon, while preparing for an airshow to honor his father.

Starting at a young age, Ethell published technical studies of WWII-era aircraft and eventually authored 60 books and over 1,000 magazine articles covering all aspects of aviation. He soloed at 18 and logged over 4,800 hours in over 210 types of aircraft, including most of the warbirds of the allied and Axis sides from WWII. His works on color photography of the World War II era brought to life an era which too many thought had only been filmed in black and white.

While attending college in Tennessee in the 1960s, Ethell received research grants from the National Air and Space Museum, Smithsonian Institution, and went on to guest lecture at colleges and academic institutes. His co-authored study of the first American daylight attack on Berlin has often been compared to the works of Cornelius Ryan and Stephen Ambrose in presenting a balanced account of one of the most pivotal events of World War II, the first daylight deep penetration raid against the capital of Nazi Germany. He was featured in the PBS Nova documentary "Top Gun Over Russia" about the military aircraft of the former Soviet Union, and appeared as an expert commentator on numerous documentaries.

His extensive collection of World War II colour photographs was made available online after his death.
