= Charles Townsend Ludington =

American businessman (1896–1968)

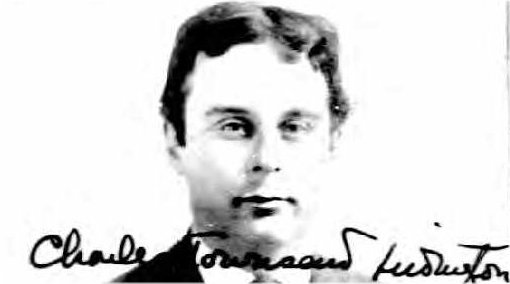
- 1924 passport photo
- Born: January 16, 1896; New York City
- Died: January 19, 1968 (aged 72); Florida
- Occupation: Businessman

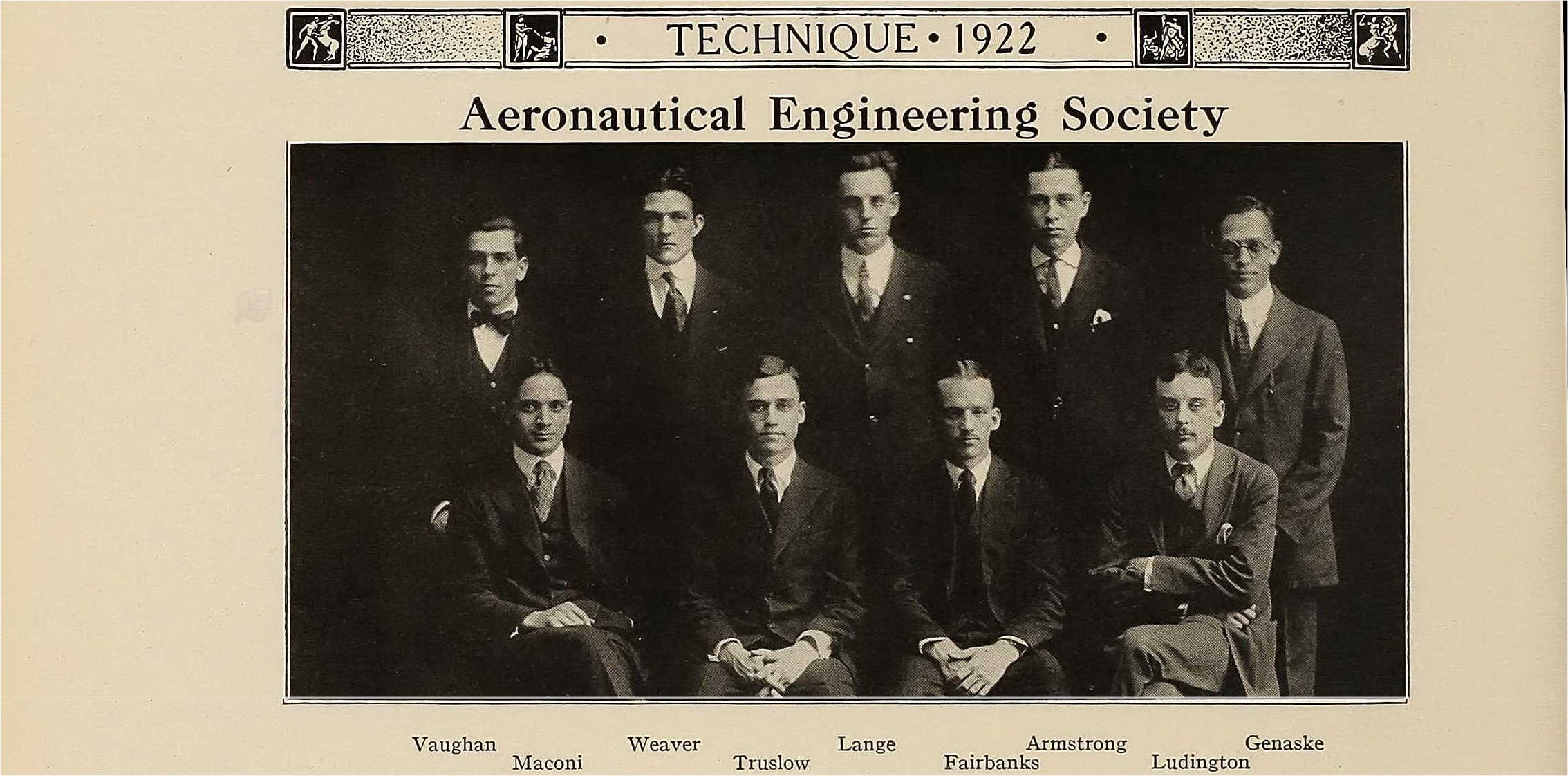
MIT 1922 Yearbook – "Technique" C T Ludington (bottom row, far right)

Charles Townsend Ludington (also known as Charles T. Ludington or C. T. Ludington; January 16, 1896 – January 19, 1968), was a businessman of Philadelphia. He was an aviation pioneer who helped establish an every-hour-on-the-hour air service between New York and Washington.

== Early life ==
Ludington was born to Charles Henry Ludington and Ethel Mildred (Saltus) Ludington in New York City on January 16, 1896. His brothers were Wright S. Ludington and Nicholas.

Ludington attended Adirondack School of northeastern New York state and the Haverford School, and graduated from Yale University in 1919. He also attended the Massachusetts Institute of Technology (MIT).

Ludington served in World War I. After the war, he was involved in various aeronautical enterprises.

== Mid-life and career ==
Ludington was interested in aviation lighting and mail service by air.

In 1923, Ludington organized the Ludington Exhibition Company. A Farman Sport aircraft he promoted is restored at Smithsonian Institution in Washington, D.C.

Ludington helped develop National Air Transport.

Camden Central Airport was formally dedicated and opened in September 1929.

Ludington offered a line of boats under the Ludington Boats Corporation between 1929 and 1931, that was formerly Ludington Aircraft – Boat Division. Jake Dunnell was a driver.

Ludington, his brother, and Eugene Luther Vidal and Paul F. Collins originated the idea for and invested in Ludington Airline. Between the four of them they managed to run Ludington Airline without government mail revenues for a few years. Their venture led to the investigation known as the Air Mail scandal. The Ludington Line was acquired by Eastern Air Transport, later known as Eastern Airlines.

In 1939 Ludington was the founding president of the Aircraft Owners and Pilots Association.

== Personal life ==
Ludington married Constance Guyot Cameron in 1922; they had three daughters and a son. Their first child was Ethel Saltus, born at Ardmore on May 21, 1923. Their second child was Anne Finley, born at Ardmore on September 26, 1925. Their third child was Constance Cameron, born September 1, 1931. Their fourth child was Charles Townsend Ludington Junior.

Ludington was affiliated with the Merion Cricket Club, Racquet Club of Washington, Yale University Club, Santa Barbara Yacht Club, Bayside Yacht Club, Delaware River Yacht Club, Philadelphia Yacht Club, and the Aero Club of Pennsylvania. He was a Republican and a member of the Bryn Mawr Presbyterian Church.

== Later life and death ==
Ludington in later life had homes in Miami, Philadelphia and Old Lyme, Connecticut. He died at the age of 72 on January 19, 1968.

== Works ==
Ludington's book "Smoke Streams: Visualized Air Flow" was, according to The New York Times, "used for several years as a basic textbook on aero-dynamics".

== Sources ==
- Borgeson, Griffith (August 21, 2005). Errett Lobban: His Empire. Automobile Heritage Publishing & Co. ISBN 978-0-9711468-7-7. "Between them they worked out the formula which made the line the first one in history not to lose money by carrying passengers without the benefit of government subsidy in the form of a mail contract."
- Downs, Winfield Scott (1934). Encyclopedia of American biography. American Historical Society.
- Evans-Hylton, Patrick (2005). Aviation in Hampton Roads. Arcadia Publishing. ISBN 978-0-7385-1820-6.
- Gardner, Lester Durand (1928). Who's who in American Aeronautics ... Aviation Publishing Corporation.
- Princeton Alumni (1935). Princeton Alumni Weekly. Princeton alumni weekly. OCLC 2436114.
- Russell, David Lee (October 1, 2013). Eastern Air Lines: 1926–1991. McFarland. ISBN 978-1-4766-0196-0.
- Trimble, William F. (1982). High Frontier. University of Pittsburgh Pre. ISBN 978-0-8229-7426-0.
- Winters, Kathleen C. (November 23, 2010). Amelia Earhart. St. Martin's Press. ISBN 978-0-230-11229-2.
