= Association of Professional Flight Attendants =

American Airlines union

APFA, Association of Professional Flight Attendants
- Association of Professional Flight Attendants, APFA
- Headquarters: Euless, Texas
- Location: United States
- Affiliations: Independent
- Website: www.apfa.org

The Association of Professional Flight Attendants (APFA) is a labor union which was founded in 1977 and represents over 28,000 flight attendants at American Airlines. In 2003, APFA played a major role in keeping American Airlines solvent and out of bankruptcy by giving back an employee bailout of $340 million in annual salary and benefits, for a total of over $3 billion. APFA had been in negotiations with American for almost four years when the carrier filed for chapter 11-bankruptcy protection on November 29, 2011.

== Strike of 1998 ==
More than 90 percent of the 21,000 members honored the 11-day strike called on November 18, virtually shutting the airline down. On November 22, President Bill Clinton intervened in the labor dispute and persuaded both sides to submit to binding arbitration ending the 11-day strike on its fifth day.

== American Airlines bankruptcy ==
After years of losses, plunging capital stock prices, contract negotiations, and failed business strategies, in November 2011, American Airlines filed for Chapter 11 protection in the US Bankruptcy Court for the Southern District of New York. Arpey resigned as CEO and was replaced by longtime American executive Tom Horton.

Shortly after the filing, in December, the US Trustee appointed the Unsecured Creditors Committee (UCC). All three of the unions on the property were awarded a seat, as were the Pension Benefit Guaranty Corporation (PBGC), Boeing Capital, Hewlett-Packard, and three major bond-holders. The UCC represented the interest of parties who were owed money by the bankrupt company and who did not have any collateral standing behind their claim. The committee became the de facto Board of Directors throughout the restructuring. Although the APA and TWU sent representatives to the UCC, Laura Glading, president of APFA, chose to sit on the committee herself.

In February 2012 American released its Term Sheets detailing the concessions it would seek from labor under Section 1113 of the Bankruptcy Code. Section 1113 allows for bankrupt companies to void their labor contracts and impose new concessionary agreements with only the approval of the Judge necessary. Typically, the threat of imposed draconian contracts motivates unions to achieve mutual agreements on concessionary contracts.

In March 2012, facing pressure from APFA, Allied Pilots Association (APA), Transport Workers Union of America (TGWU), the PBGC and others, American backed off its original demand to terminate pensions and instead offered to freeze them. The pension freeze allowed employees to keep full benefits accrued before the time of the freeze.

In April 2012 APFA, APA, and TWU announced that they had reached agreements with the management team of US Airways and that the three major unions at American supported a merger between the two carriers with the US Airways team in control. APFA’s bridge agreement with US Airways provided a temporary contract while the two carriers merged followed by a guaranteed network-rate contract. Additionally, the agreement included a Voluntary Early-Out Program that allows flight attendants to take a lump sum payment and retire.

In August APFA approved management’s Last, Best, and Final Offer (LBFO). Although the LBFO represented substantial improvements to the term sheet, including the VEOP, it was still a very concessionary agreement. APFA, APA, and TWU remained committed to achieving a merger with US Airways inside of bankruptcy. As part of this strategy, TWU also ratified a concessionary deal. APA rejected its first tentative agreement (TA) but a “Me Too” letter, secured by APFA, guaranteed that the labor savings from the Pilots Agreement were equivalent to the savings achieved in the flight attendants’ collective bargaining agreement (CBA).

In September US Airways and American began to exchange confidential information regarding operations and finances. This cooperation was subject to a non-disclosure agreement (NDA) between the two parties which included a mandatory “quiet period” during which no party can speak publicly about the merger talks. Also bound by this agreement were the members of the UCC, including APFA.

In February 2013 AA and US Airways announced their plans to merge.

== 2023-2024 strike threat ==
In August 2023, APFA members voted 99.47% in favor of a strike authorization, with 93% of union membership participating in the voting. However, a tentative agreement between American Airlines and the APFA was reached in July 2024. In September 2024, American Airlines flight attendants ratified a new contract, thus averting the threat of a labor strike. According to the Association of Professional Flight Attendants, the five-year contract includes pay increases of up to 20.5% on October 1, 2024 and annual raises of 2.75%, 3%, 3%, and 3.5% after that.
