= Glading =

Glading is a surname. Notable people with the surname include:

- Billy Glading, American lacrosse player
- Bob Glading (1920–2014), New Zealand golfer
- Dan Glading (born 1986), American lacrosse player
- Laura Glading, American labor leader
- Percy Glading, English communist
- Gregory Glading, American author
- Pierce Glading, American baseball player
