= USAPA =

USAPA may refer to:

- US Airline Pilots Association
- USA Patriot Act
- United States Amateur Pickleball Association or USA Pickleball Association, previous names of USA Pickleball
