= QIK =

Computer system used by airline agents

QIK (Qantas Intelligent Keypad) is an intelligent airline agent application first developed in the late 1980s as a front end to mainframe computer reservations systems.

== Activity ==
QIK was designed by a startup within Qantas called Qadrant, as a productivity tool for use in the airline's reservation call centres. The software was developed for Qadrant under contract by Tetra Tech Data Systems (a subsidiary of Honeywell), a small custom software house in San Diego, California. The Q.I.K. acronym was derived from its use of a separate keypad attached to the keyboard. The keys on the keypad acted as function keys. In later versions the physical keyboard was disposed of and replaced with a logical keypad represented as a quadrant on the user's screen mapped to standard QWERTY keyboard (F1-F12) function keys.

Marketed under the brands QIK, QIK-RES & QIK-CHEK these applications encapsulate airline business rules in a PC-based smart application and send the required transactions to the airline mainframe or host for processing. In doing the training time for an airline agent could be reduced from six weeks to two weeks. In addition the automation of host transactions eliminated format entry errors. This reduced the need to resend transactions and led to a reduction in mainframe usage costs for airlines.

In the early 1990s Qantas formed a joint venture operation with DMR Consulting to market QIK and other transportation IT solutions under the name of Qadrant International. In 1997 DMR Consulting purchased the remaining 49% stock of Qadrant from Qantas Airways to become the sole owner of the company. Qadrant went on to develop later versions of QIK in conjunction with Sabre Decision Technologies (SDT), at the time an AMR/American Airlines subsidiary. Sabre was just finishing development its own system called NEW RES. A head to head evaluation of QIK-RES and NEW RES was undertaken in July, 1989 at American Airlines' Southeastern Reservation Office. QIK-RES was found to be 7% faster than the native reservation system, while NEW RES was found to be 15% slower. Shortly thereafter, Sabre licensed QIK was licensed from Qadrant and modified to work with the Sabre reservation system. This joint development exercise expanded QIK from the DOS platform to the OS/2 & Windows platforms and was brought to market as QIK-II. This collaboration continued and QIK-II was migrated to the SITA's Common Use Airport platform CUTE/OS. Now the majority of QANTAS workstations use Novell's Application delivery system to deliver them an emulated version through infoconnect.

QIK-CHEK & QIK-RES are also sold as part of the TurboSabre suite by Sabre Systems. QIK applications are used by more than 70 airlines worldwide.

== Airlines known to use QIK ==
- Air Canada (transitioned to Amadeus CRS)
- Air New Zealand
- American Airlines
- Bangkok Airways
- British Airways
- Caribbean Star Airlines
- Caribbean Sun Airlines
- Cathay Pacific Airways
- Continental Airlines (transitioned to in-house developed [[EZR]])
- Copa Airlines
- Dragonair
- EVA Airways
- Finnair
- Lufthansa
- Qantas
- Scandinavian Airlines
- South African Airways
- Southwest Airlines
- Sun Country Airlines
- Thai Airways
- US Airways
