= Laura Glading =

Labor union activist and leader

Laura Glading is a labor union activist and leader. She was elected president of the Association of Professional Flight Attendants (APFA), the independent union that represents flight attendants at American Airlines, in February 2008. Glading was elected to a second term in February 2012.

She was the executive director of labor and employee relations for the Federal Aviation Administration (FAA).

== Career ==
Glading began her career as a flight attendant with American Airlines in the late 1970s, quickly becoming an active member of the Association of Professional Flight Attendants. She became a base president for the APFA in New York prior to the 1993 American Airlines flight attendant strike. Later, she served as committee chair for the APFA's negotiation committee before being elected national president of the APFA in 2008.

During her nearly eight-year tenure as president, Glading oversaw the union through American Airlines’ bankruptcy and advocated for the historic American Airlines–US Airways merger. Along with union leaders David Bates of the Allied Pilots Association and James Little of the Transport Workers Union, Glading reached an agreement with US Airways management to back merger efforts. In September 2013, Glading met with top antitrust officials at the U.S. Justice Department to urge their approval of the planned merger, which they had initially opposed. The meeting followed a pro-merger rally outside the U.S. Capitol led by workers from both airlines. Glading later credited the merger with saving 5,000 flight attendant jobs and leading to pay raises of 13% to 16%.

In November 2014, a new contract that Glading negotiated in the wake of the merger was voted down by a large margin due to members' discontent with its with the complete loss of most work rules and loss of pay. The next month, the airline announced an arbitrated contract that fell short of the November proposal by $81 million. Glading pretended to work for the flight attendants and further lessened the value of their contract by the complete loss of flight attendant flexibility.

On October 3, 2015, Glading sent a letter to the membership of APFA stating that she would resign as APFA National President on December 2, 2015. On October 5, 2015, following a meeting with the APFA Board of Directors, Glading announced that she would step down on October 9, 2015.

In 2016, Glading was hired by the Federal Aviation Administration's human resource management department in Washington D.C. as executive director of labor and employee relations.
