= Billy Glading =

American lacrosse player

Personal information
- Nationality: American
- Born: Washington, D.C., U.S.
- Height: 6 ft 2 in (188 cm)
- Weight: 190 lb (86 kg; 13 st 8 lb)

Sport
- Position: Midfield
- MLL team Former teams: Washington Bayhawks; Boston Cannons, Washington Bayhawks
- NCAA team: University of Virginia
- Pro career: 2005–

Billy Glading was a professional lacrosse player with the Washington Bayhawks of Major League Lacrosse, and the Philadelphia Wings of the National Lacrosse League.

== Professional career ==
2010 Season (Chesapeake): As a captain, played in 8 games and recorded 5 goals. Helped guide the Bayhawks to a 2010 MLL Title.

2009 Season (Washington): As a captain, played in all 12 games and led all defensive midfielders in the league with a career high 10 goals.

2008 Season (Washington): Played in all 12 games and recorded 6 goals and 4 assists.

2006 Season (Boston): Played in all 12 games at midfield. Glading scored 6 goals and had 4 assists while picking up 24 ground balls on the season.

2005 Season (Boston): Played in 2 games in his first season with the Cannons, recorded one goal vs. the Baltimore Bayhawks.

== College career ==
Played college lacrosse at the University of Virginia. Won the 2003 NCAA Championship while being named a Third Team All American the same year. Was the ACC Tournament MVP with 5 goals in Virginia's win over Duke. Awarded the team MVP award in 2003 while scoring 24 goals that season. Joined the University of Virginia men's basketball team for the 2003-2004 season.
