= US Airline Pilots Association =

USAPA
- US Airline Pilots Association
- Merged into: merged into Allied Pilots Association
- Founded: 2007
- Headquarters: Charlotte, NC
- Location: United States
- Members: Represented approx 5200 US Airways pilots.
- Key people: Captain Gary Hummel (President) Captain Steve Smyser (Executive Vice President) First Officer Stephen Bradford (founder)
- Website: Official website

The US Airline Pilots Association (USAPA) was the collective bargaining agent for the majority former US Airways "East" pilots, and the minority former America West Airlines "West" pilots. USAPA was led by East pilot Mike Cleary. USAPA was formed by East pilots for the exclusive and purpose of attempting to overturn the results of the previous pilot seniority integration arbitration. During the fair representation trial, USAPA used as courtroom witnesses East pilots Chesley Sullenberger and Jeffrey Skiles of the famous Hudson River flight 1549. Both witnesses testified in support of USAPA.

== Integrated seniority list controversy ==
There has been much controversy surrounding the formation of USAPA and the removal of the Air Line Pilots Association (ALPA) as the bargaining representative for US Airways pilots. This controversy is exclusively centered around the method used to integrate seniority lists from US Airways and America West Airlines after their merger, and has resulted in a division in the ranks between the previous US Airways pilots (often referred to as the East pilots) and the former America West pilots (often referred to as the West pilots).

The East and West pilots along with US Airways management signed a Transition Agreement (TA) in 2005: this tri-party agreement specifies the methods for merging the two pilot groups and the operating rules during the transition. Until a joint contract is ratified by the combined pilot group, the East and West pilots remain separate. This means that all aircraft brought to the merger by each respective pilot group can only be flown by the pre-merger pilots of each group. No cross utilization or mixing of crews and/or equipment is permitted during the transition period.

The Transition Agreement signed by the three parties specified that ALPA Merger Policy would be used to combine the seniority lists and US Airways management agreed to accept the list as long as certain cost requirements were met. Doug Parker officially accepted the seniority list from ALPA First Vice-President Paul Rice during December 2007. Since that time, the East pilots, first as represented by ALPA and later USAPA, have tried to circumvent the seniority provisions of the TA by claiming that the new union is not bound by the former bargaining agents agreements. This issue is under dispute and currently under the jurisdiction of Judge Roslyn Silver of the Arizona District Court. USAPA represented East pilots have also sought a compromise solution but this was rejected by Judge Silver as the West pilots do not have a legal entity to negotiate seniority. The former bargaining agent warned the new union that the elimination of separate ratification under ALPA merger policy with the election of USAPA would forever cement the unmodified Nicolau Award as the certified seniority list of the new US Airways.

In 2005, America West merged with US Airways. Before and after the merger, ALPA was the bargaining representative for pilots from both airlines. During merger negotiations in late 2006, representatives from the two pilot groups were unable to reach an agreement with respect to integration of seniority. The US Airways pilots' seniority proposal, written only by US Airways East pilots, was to base seniority primarily on date-of-hire, with conditions and restrictions to protect the bases and positions of the former West pilots. This would place the US Airways East pilots at the top of the ranks, while nearly 80% of the former America West pilots would be at the bottom of the seniority list. In compliance with ALPA Merger Policy, the America West pilots' proposal included a plan that defined a series of ratios, which would maintain relative seniority for all pilots in the new organization. The proposal would have placed many US Airways pilots with more than 17 years longevity but on furlough at the time of the merger in a position below recently hired pilots of America West, which was not acceptable to the US Airways East pilots.

In early 2007, the independent East and West merger committees selected arbitrator George Nicolau to mediate and then arbitrate the seniority integration. Two pilot neutrals were selected in accordance with ALPA merger policy: Jim Brucia, a Continental Pilot for the East and Steve Gillen, a United pilot for the West. Steve Gillen and James Brucia are now leaders of their respective merger committees as their companies merged in 2010. Unable to mediate a solution, the case went to arbitration. During that process, US Airways pilots defied the arbitrator's warnings that he was not going to award US Airways East pilots their goal of date of hire.

The Nicolau Award was published by the panel in May 2007. Per ALPA Merger Policy, the 512 top seniority positions went to the most senior US Airways pilots to protect the 19 wide-body aircraft seats they brought to the merger. The remaining active pilots were blended to represent their pre-merger seniority bidding positions. All furloughed US Airways East pilots were placed at the bottom of the list in accordance with established seniority list integration precedence. Even though ALPA Merger Policy had in 1992 been written/amended in large part by USAir East pilots, many US Airways East pilots contended the Nicolau decision violated ALPA merger policies. US Airways East pilots also alleged other errors in the award, including the treatment of MDA (Mid-Atlantic Division) pilots as furloughed pilots.

ALPA Merger Policy found in Section 45 of the Union Operating Manual required ALPA to remain neutral in the seniority integration process if the merger involved two ALPA represented airlines. As both the US Airways and America West pilots were represented by ALPA, no ALPA funds could be used in the process. The East and West pilot groups were required to independently hire and fund their own merger counsel. The West hired Jeff Freund to represent their effort and the East Dan Katz. Both lawyers were and remain independent of ALPA and represented each respective pilot group with complete neutrality. No evidence of fraud or manipulation has ever been brought forward. A lawsuit was filed by the East MEC in D.C. District Court following the Award's publication alleging impropriety, but the lawsuit was later dropped by USAPA as having no merit. This was confirmed by newly hired USAPA attorney Syzmanski before Judge Silver in early December 2011 when responding to her questions as to why the lawsuit was not pursued.

USAPA was organized following an emotionally charged rally at ALPA's Herndon headquarters in 2007. Before USAPA was voted in, they visited the former America West pilots in Phoenix to tell their side of the story and fulfill a legal requirement. A video of the meeting was produced by the former America West pilots. In April 2008, by a majority vote and almost exclusive East vote, USAPA replaced ALPA as the new pilots union for all the US Airways pilots: thus costing all Airways pilots over $500,000 of lost income over their careers.

The former America West pilots vehemently objected to the formation of USAPA and overwhelmingly funded a legal effort operating under the name Leonidas LCC to preserve their legal rights. Recently, Federal Judge Roslyn Silver assigned class designation to the West pilots in the ongoing Declaratory Action case. Leonidas LCC remains the funded legal entity representing the West pilots before the court.

== Declaratory judgment ==
Recently, US Airways requested a declaratory judgment. It is asking the court to determine whether or not they would be liable should they accept a seniority list other than Nicolau. Judge Silver rejected USAPA's claims to dismiss the lawsuit, and she also rejected USAPA's objections to West class certification. After a December hearing, she required that all parties submit summary judgment briefs to her court by January 27. Rebuttals are due by February 19, with her expedited decision to follow.

Until this case is heard and all appeals are exhausted, both pilot groups will remain separate under their respective contracts and operations. The 2011 merger speculation between American Airlines and US Airways is suspected to be the motive of US Airways declaratory legal filing. Former Continental Airlines CEO Gordon Bethune said on CNBC in December 2011, there is a likelihood of a merger push involving Tempe-based US Airways Group Inc and American Airlines. If Judge Silver rules that US Airways is liable should they accept a seniority integration outside of Nicolau, USAPA will be required to use the Nicolau Award as their certified seniority list for any subsequent transactions.

== US Airways management position ==
US Airways Attorney Robert A. Siegel made the following statement to the court on 2/21/12 Court Document 164:

Given that the integrated seniority list was accepted by US Airways as required by the Transition Agreement, which is binding on US Airways’ pilots (whether represented by ALPA or USAPA)

The Transition Agreement established a process for integration of the seniority lists – namely, “final and binding” arbitration between the East Pilots and West Pilots “in accordance with ALPA Merger Policy.” (Sep. Stmt. [Doc. No. 156-1] at ¶¶ 10-11.) But it also created an obligation on the part of US Airways to accept the integrated seniority list generated through that agreed-upon process so long as the specified conditions were met, and it thereby created prospective substantive rights that inured to the benefit of the pilots and not just process rights. (Doc. No. 156-1 at ¶ 10.) Once ALPA (as the pilots’ representative) presented the integrated seniority list to US Airways and US Airways accepted it, if not sooner, those substantive rights materialized and were not, as USAPA would have it, a mere “tentative agreement between ALPA and US Airways on a bargaining proposal.” (Doc. No. 152 at 16:27-17:1.) Thus, even if USAPA's proffered distinction between “substantive rights” and “process elements” had support in the RLA jurisprudence, which it does not, the Transition Agreement undeniably created “substantive rights” with respect to seniority integration and USAPA inherited that status quo when it replaced ALPA as the pilots’ representative.

== Army of Leonidas, West Pilots ==
2007. After the merger, during the organization phase of USAPA, the former America West Pilots, formed a group to legally defend their pilots and the Nicolau arbitration award, AWAPPA (America West Pilots Protective Association).

AWAPPA, and 18 west pilots, were sued by USAPA under federal RICO laws within one month of USAPA winning the NMB election. The RICO lawsuit was dismissed by a federal district court in North Carolina: USAPA appealed that decision. The 4th Circuit Court of Appeals upheld the lower court's ruling against USAPA.

Because of the controversy surrounding AWAPPA's involvement in the RICO lawsuit and the former America West pilots conduct at that time, the West pilots formed a new organization, Leonidas, LLC.

The new group representing the former West pilots, Army of Leonidas, were involved in a controversy involving the alleged transfer of East pilots' personal data. In 2009, a former Chief pilot for America West Airlines allegedly acquired East pilots identity information from US Airways company computers and handed it over to Leonidas representatives. Included in this alleged breach of data were some social security and passport numbers. US Airways offered the East pilots one free year of identity theft protection.

In March 2011, US Airways put the former Chief Pilot and two other former America West pilots on paid administrative leave. Pilot union says US Airways employee leaked personal data of 3,000 pilots article. The former America West Pilots were given a 30-day suspension by US Airways for their involvement in the data breach, even though they were exonerated by the external investigation. At a Crew News event, US Airways CEO Doug Parker admitted that the three pilots did nothing wrong but they needed to be punished for costing the company money. It is widely believed that the suspension will be overturned at arbitration. In addition, the West pilots used their continued unity to voluntarily compensate the three pilots for any lost income.

== Duty of Fair Representation trial ==
On May 13, 2009, a group of AWA pilots who filed suit on behalf of the class of America West pilots in Federal District Court in Phoenix, Arizona succeeded in convincing a federal judge and federal jury that USAPA breached their duty of fair representation to the America West pilots. Federal Judge Neil Wake issued an injunction against USAPA during the week of May 18, 2009 barring USAPA from changing the seniority list from the Airline Pilots Association (ALPA) internal arbitrated list produced by Arbitrator George Nicolau. The trial lasted for eight days of trial, following nearly 9 months of legal preliminaries, and included thousands of pages of evidence.

The DFR suit was appealed by USAPA. In December 2009, the United States Court of Appeals for the Ninth Circuit heard the case.

On February 12, 2010, Judge Wake issued a temporary stay concerning all District Court proceedings in the Addington case. This was done to allow the 9th Circuit Court of Appeals to rule on the initial outcome of the federal court trial prior to proceeding with a damages trial for the former AWA pilots listed on the lawsuit.

On June 4, 2010, the 9th Circuit Court of Appeals ordered a dismissal of the DFR suit against USAPA: "USAPA contends, inter alia, that the district court never had jurisdiction because the West Pilots’ claim is not ripe. We agree." However, the court also noted that nothing prevented the West pilots from re-filing a new DFR suit once a pilot contract was voted on. Courts also advised USAPA that it needs a "legitimate union purpose" to alter the Nicoau Award. To date, USAPA has not identified such a purpose.

Petition for a writ of certiorari was filed by the America West Pilots legal team with the Supreme Court and was subsequently denied on January 10, 2011. This affirmed the 9th Circuit Courts dismissal of the duty of fair representation lawsuit against USAPA.

== US Airways permanent injunction against USAPA ==
During the summer of 2011, US Airways East pilots engaged in an illegal slowdown of the airline. The thought was that hurting the operation would bring Doug Parker to the negotiating table and he would agree to break the Transition Agreement and accept a date-of-hire seniority list. Thousands of passengers were inconvenienced and the illegal work action cost the corporation millions of dollars. In response the work action, US Airways filed for a Temporary Injunction against USAPA and all US Airways pilots to cease and desist. The lawsuit was filed in North Carolina District Court and assigned to Judge Robert J. Conrad. After a series of hearings, Judge Conrad agreed with US Airways and issued an injunction citing the overwhelming evidence of a work action.

In January 2012, USAPA settled the lawsuit and agreed to convert the temporary injunction to permanent. USAPA and all US Airways pilots must comply with Judge Conrad's order and the permanent injunction against any illegal work actions. Since Judge Conrad's Order, the US Airways operation has returned to normal and US Airways is once again an industry operations leader.

On March 18, 2014, USAPA asked a federal judge in Charlotte to lift the 2012 injunction that prevented pilots from engaging in any job actions because a merger with American Airlines Group (AAL) brought an industry standard contract.

== Teamster merger attempt ==
Since its inception, USAPA leadership has flirted with the Teamsters to provide representational services. An alliance was formed shortly after the election to align the goals of the Airline Division and USAPA. After the Temporary Injunction was issued by Judge Conrad, many BPR members and outside supporters, such as USAPA founder Steve Bradford, supported a full merger with the Teamsters.

USAPA President Mike Cleary appointed an ad-hoc committee to study the feasibility of a merger and the impact it would have on the date-of-hire objective. Teamster Airline Division President David Bourne told USAPA that the Nicolau Award would be inherited and could not be overturned.

Before the issue could move forward, Teamster President James Hoffa Jr. wrote a letter to Mike Cleary declining a merger at the time, citing other organizing obligations. It is widely believed that Hoffa did not want to involve the Teamsters before a joint contract with the Nicolau could be implemented. Hoffa was also concerned that a possible deal with American Airlines would cause the property to leave his organization for the larger Allied Pilots Association (APA) once the merger was consummated.

== Recent officer elections ==
USAPA just completed the first round of officer elections. The pilots soundly rejected the hard line approach fostered by President Cleary by eliminating Capt. Bill McKee, First Officer Courtney Borman, and Capt. Jamie Javurek from the run-off election. The West candidates received the highest vote totals. First Officer Eric Ferguson will face Capt. Gary Hummel in the presidential run-off. First Officer Jeff Koontz will face Capt. Stephen Bradford in the vice-presidential runoff. Capt. Ken Holmes will face Capt. Steve Smyser in the executive vice-presidential run off. The West candidates advocate acceptance of the Nicolau Award and an immediate end to further litigation with a focus on unity and a Delta type contract. The East candidates led by Capt. Hummel advocate for the courts to decide the seniority dispute while pursuing a contract. Further court actions with appeals may take 3–10 years more for completion. They also propose bringing back Lee Seham to lead the legal effort.

USAPA elected three West pilots to the Appeal Board, which serves as an internal dispute resolution body as required by the Department of Labor guidelines. USAPA rescinded the results of that election before the three West pilots could begin their terms.
