= Allied Pilots Association =

Labor union representing American Airlines pilots

APA
- Allied Pilots Association
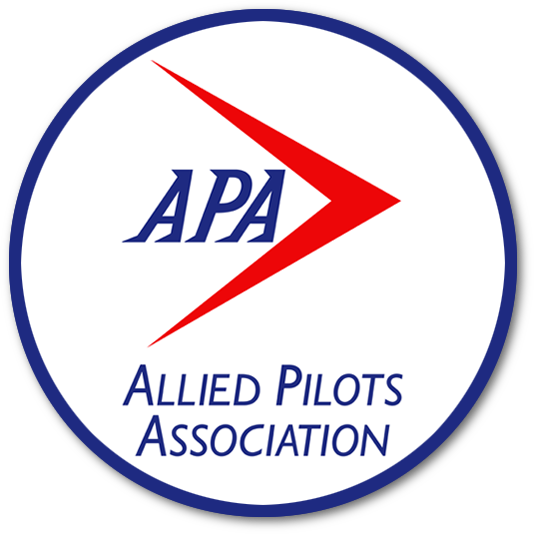
- Founded: 1963
- Headquarters: Fort Worth, Texas
- Location: United States
- Members: 14,000
- Key people: Captain Nick Silva (APA President); Captain Chris Torres (APA Vice President); Captain Phil Johnson (APA Secretary-Treasurer)
- Affiliations: Coalition of Airline Pilots Associations
- Website: www.alliedpilots.org

The Allied Pilots Association (APA) is the labor union representing American Airlines pilots. APA was founded in 1963 by a group of American Airlines pilots who broke away from the Air Line Pilots Association (ALPA). The five founding pilots of APA, Nick O'Connell, Paul Atkins, Bob Guba, Joe Garvey, and Dick Lyons, were expelled for life from ALPA. The first headquarters was located in New York City before it moved to Fort Worth, Texas.

== History ==
In 1999, the union called for strike action, a "sick out" in which union pilots called in sick. American Airlines realiated with a lawsuit for $45 million in damages, nearly the entire net worth of the union and won.

In 2001, on its pilots' behalf, APA filed a lawsuit against American Airlines. The airline attempted to circumvent scope clause that placed limits on regional flying. It did so by altering the AmericanConnection IATA code to AX for flights operated by Chautauqua and Trans States. The issue was settled in 2007 when a federal arbitrator ordered American to pay $23 million to APA members for violating the scope clause.

The merger of American and US Airways resulted in the carriers' pilot labor organizations to be combined. In 2014, USAPA merged into the much larger APA. At the time, USAPA had been under a permanent federal injunction but asked the judge to have the injunction lifted, as the merger brought an industry standard contract. The protagonist organization that opposed USAPA, known as America West Airlines Pilots Protective Alliance (AWAPPA), was dissolved.
