= US Airways =

Airline of the United States (1939–2015)

- The airline's final logo, used from 2011 to 2015

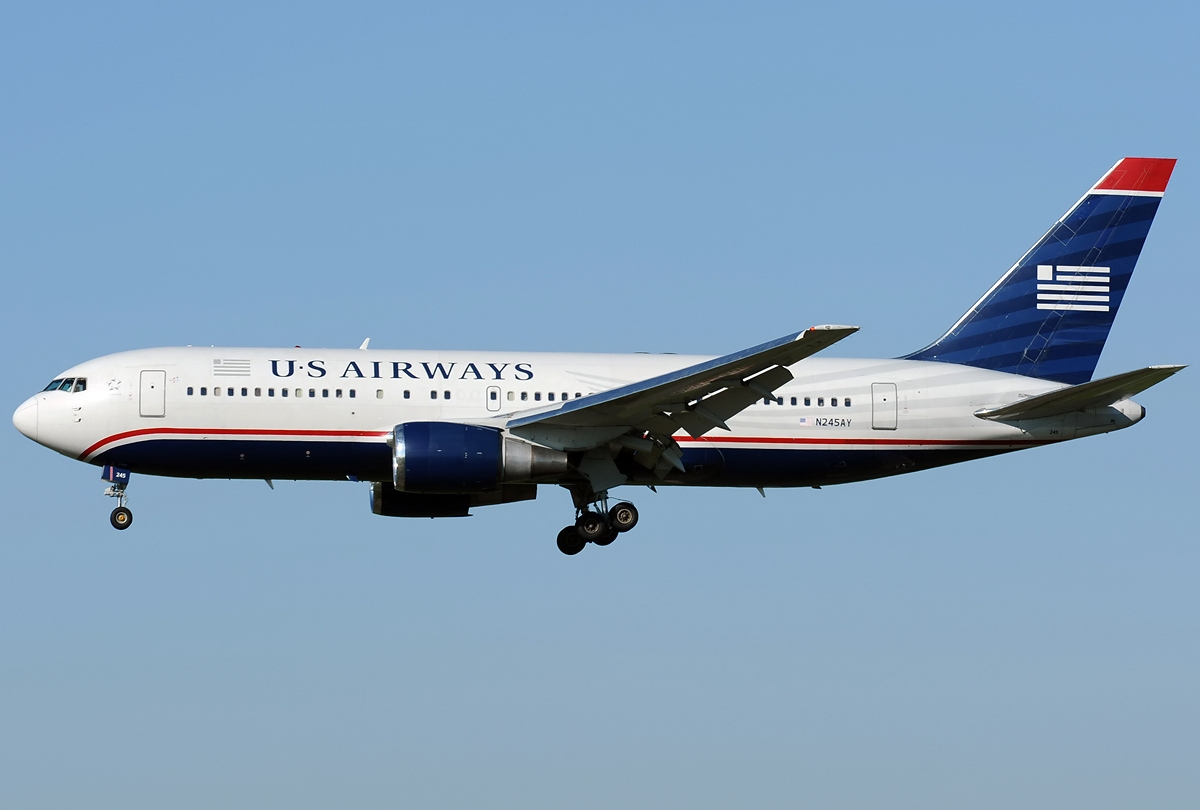
- A US Airways Boeing 767-201ER
IATA	ICAO	Call sign
AL (1979–1988); US (1988–2015)	USA (1979–2008); AWE (2008–2015)	US AIR (1979–2008); CACTUS (2008–2015)
- Founded: 1939 (as All American Aviation)
- Commenced operations: October 28, 1979 (as USAir); February 27, 1997 (as US Airways)
- Ceased operations: February 27, 1997 (as USAir); October 17, 2015 (merged into American Airlines)
- AOC #: AALA025A
- Hubs: Charlotte (1989–2015); Cleveland (1987–1992); Indianapolis (1987–1997); Las Vegas (2007–2008); Philadelphia; Phoenix–Sky Harbor (2007–2015); Pittsburgh (1979–2004); Washington–National
- Frequent-flyer program: Dividend Miles
- Alliance: Star Alliance (2004–2014); Oneworld (affiliate; 2014–2015)
- Subsidiaries: MetroJet (1998–2001); US Airways Express (1989–2015); US Airways Shuttle (1992–2015)
- Parent company: US Airways Group
- Headquarters: Pittsburgh, Pennsylvania (1937–1960); Crystal City, Virginia (1960–2004); Tempe, Arizona (2005–2015)
- Key people: Doug Parker (CEO)
- Website: www.usairways.com (Archived February 23, 2015, at the Wayback Machine)

US Airways was a major airline founded in Pittsburgh, Pennsylvania, as a mail delivery airline in 1939 named All American Aviation, adding commercial passengers in 1949. In 1953, it was renamed Allegheny Airlines and operated under that name for a quarter-century. In October 1979, after the enactment of the Airline Deregulation Act, Allegheny Airlines changed its name to USAir. A decade later it had acquired Piedmont Airlines and Pacific Southwest Airlines (PSA), and was one of the United States' seven transcontinental legacy carriers. In 1997, it rebranded as US Airways.

US Airways had an extensive international and domestic network, with 193 destinations in 24 countries in North America, South America, Europe, and the Middle East. The airline was a member of Star Alliance, before becoming an affiliate member of Oneworld in March 2014. US Airways flew 343 mainline jets, as well as 278 regional jet and turboprops operated by contract and subsidiary airlines under the name US Airways Express via code sharing agreements.

The airline encountered severe financial stress in the early 2000s, filing for chapter 11 bankruptcy twice in two years. In 2005, America West Airlines carried out a reverse merger, acquiring the assets and branding of the larger US Airways while putting the America West leadership team largely in charge.

In 2013, American Airlines and US Airways announced plans to merge, creating the largest airline in the world. The holding companies of American and US Airways merged effective December 9, 2013. The combined airline carried the American Airlines name and branding and maintained the existing US Airways hubs for a period of at least five years under the terms of a settlement with the Department of Justice and several state attorneys general. US Airways management ran the combined airline from the American headquarters in Fort Worth, Texas. On April 8, 2015, the Federal Aviation Administration granted a single operating certificate for both carriers, marking the end of US Airways as an independent carrier, but the brand continued to exist until October 2015.

Its first hub was in Pittsburgh, and it also operated hubs in Charlotte, Las Vegas, Philadelphia, Phoenix–Sky Harbor, and Washington–Reagan.

The final US Airways flight was from Philadelphia to San Francisco via Charlotte and Phoenix, operating as Flight 1939 commemorating the birth of All American Aviation (later US Airways). Repainting of US Airways' planes with the American Airlines colors was expected to take until "late 2016", with new flight attendant uniforms also being introduced.

== History ==
=== Early years ===
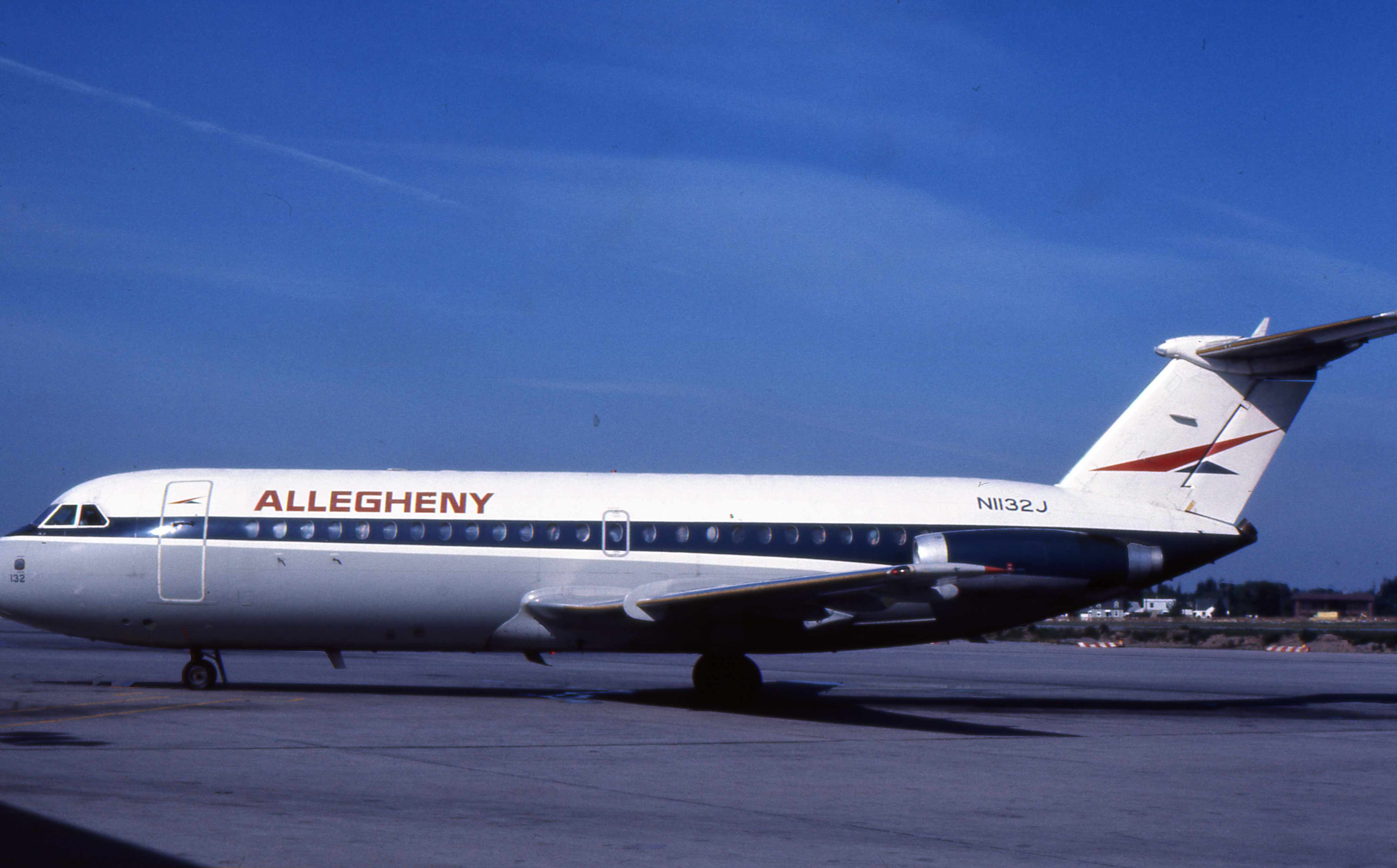
Allegheny Airlines BAC 1-11

US Airways traces its history to All American Aviation Inc., a company founded in 1939 by du Pont family brothers Richard C. du Pont and Alexis Felix du Pont Jr. Headquartered in Pittsburgh, the airline served the Ohio River valley in 1939. In 1949 the company was renamed All American Airways as it switched from airmail to passenger service; it changed its name again to Allegheny Airlines on January 1, 1953.

Allegheny's first jet was the Douglas DC-9 in 1966; it absorbed Lake Central Airlines in 1968 and Mohawk Airlines in 1972 to become one of the largest carriers in the northeastern United States. In 1973 it was the ninth-largest airline in the free world by passengers carried (and 24th largest by passenger-miles). With expansion came growing pains: in the 1970s Allegheny had the nickname "Agony Air".

Allegheny's agreement with Henson Airlines, the forerunner to today's US Airways Express carrier Piedmont Airlines, to operate "Allegheny Commuter" flights was the industry's first code-share agreement, a type of service now offered throughout the industry.

=== 1970s: Deregulation and rebranding ===
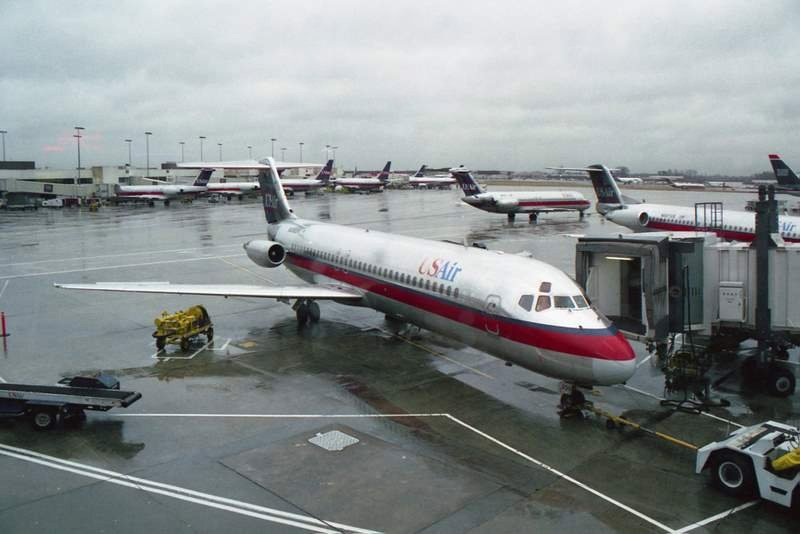
Douglas DC 9 used from 1989 to 1997

Allegheny changed its name to USAir in 1979 after the passage of the Airline Deregulation Act the previous year, which enabled the airline to expand its route network to the southeastern United States.

USAir was a launch customer for the Boeing 737-300, as the airline needed an aircraft with greater capacity to serve its growing Florida markets. USAir was the world's largest operator of DC-9 aircraft at the time and approached McDonnell Douglas to negotiate a new design. However, in the late 1970s, the McDonnell Douglas' proposed successor to the DC-9-50 did not suit USAir. After the negotiations with McDonnell Douglas broke down, Boeing came forward with a proposed variant of the 737. USAir selected the new 737 and the company worked closely with Boeing during its development, taking delivery of the first plane on November 28, 1984.

=== 1980s: Mergers and expansion ===
Revenue Passenger-kilometres, in millions
Year	Traffic
1980	8,977
1985	15,659
1990	55,903
1995	61,271
2000	75,728
2005	64,600

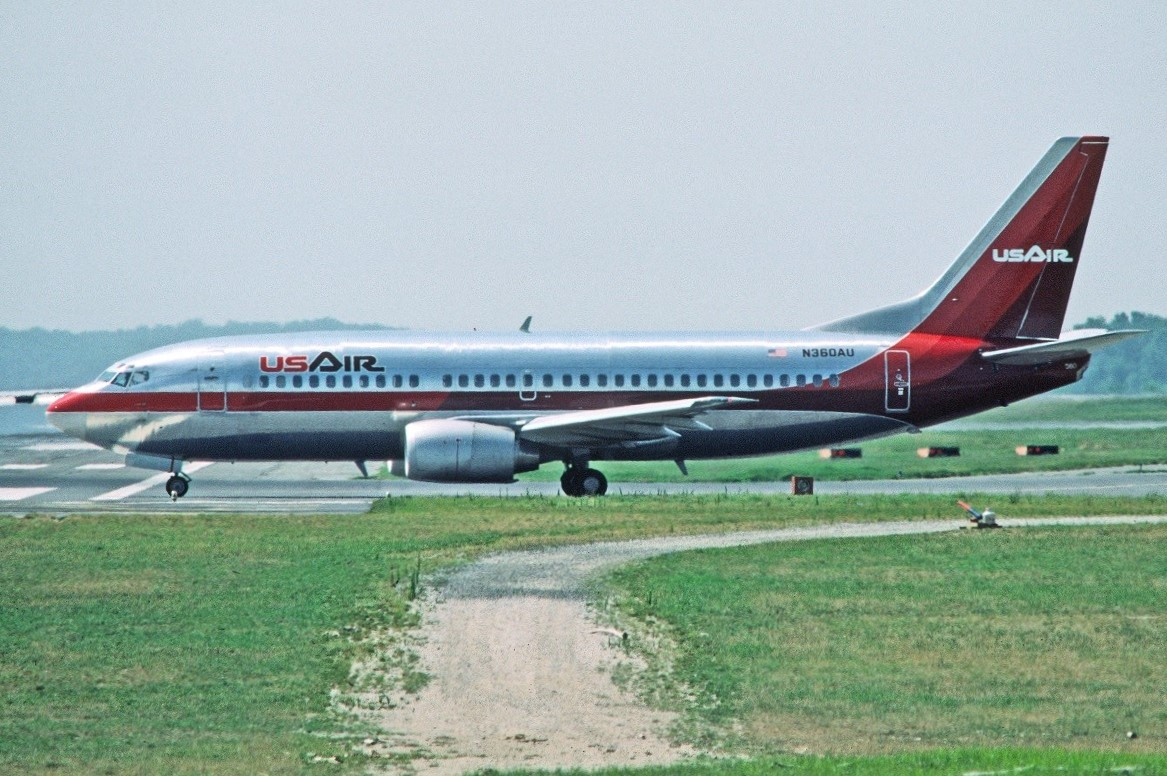
A Boeing 737-300 at Washington National Airport in 1986.

In 1979, USAir's network was east of the Mississippi, plus spokes to Houston and Phoenix; it added Dallas-Ft Worth and Kansas City in 1981, Denver in 1982 and Los Angeles, San Francisco and San Diego in 1983. It acquired two commuter airlines, Pennsylvania Airlines and Suburban Airlines, in 1985. It bought San Diego–based Pacific Southwest Airlines (PSA) in 1986 and Winston-Salem, North Carolina–based Piedmont Airlines in 1987. The PSA acquisition was completed on April 9, 1988, and the Piedmont acquisition on August 5, 1989.

The PSA acquisition gave USAir a network on the West Coast, while the Piedmont acquisition gave USAir a strong East Coast presence and hubs in Baltimore and Charlotte, which remained hubs for USAir. The Piedmont acquisition in 1989 was the largest airline merger until then and USAir became one of the world's largest airlines, with more than 5,000 flights daily to 134 airports (plus 48 more airports on USAir Express). In the next few years USAir closed down PSA's hubs in California and Piedmont's hubs in Dayton and Syracuse, though both remained focus cities.

By 1990, the airline had consolidated its headquarters, moving from Washington National Airport to a new building at Crystal City, in Arlington County, Virginia, near the airport. Maintenance and operations headquarters remained at Pittsburgh International Airport.

=== 1990s: Rebranding, fleet modernization, and failed sell-off ===
In the early 1990s, USAir expanded to Europe with flights to London, Paris, and Frankfurt from its four main hubs. The company formed partnerships, marketing the Trump Shuttle as the "USAir Shuttle" and accepting a large investment from British Airways that started one of the first transatlantic alliances, resulting in several Boeing 767-200ERs being painted in the British Airways livery, but operated by USAir. In 1992, it also invested in a new terminal at its hub in Pittsburgh.

In 1996 the alliance between USAir and British Airways ended in a court battle when British Airways announced its intentions to partner with American Airlines.

About March 1, 1997 USAir changed its name to US Airways and introduced a new corporate identity. A stylized version of the United States flag was adopted as a new logo. The new branding was applied to terminals and ticket jackets. The airline painted aircraft in deep blue and medium gray with red and white accent lines.

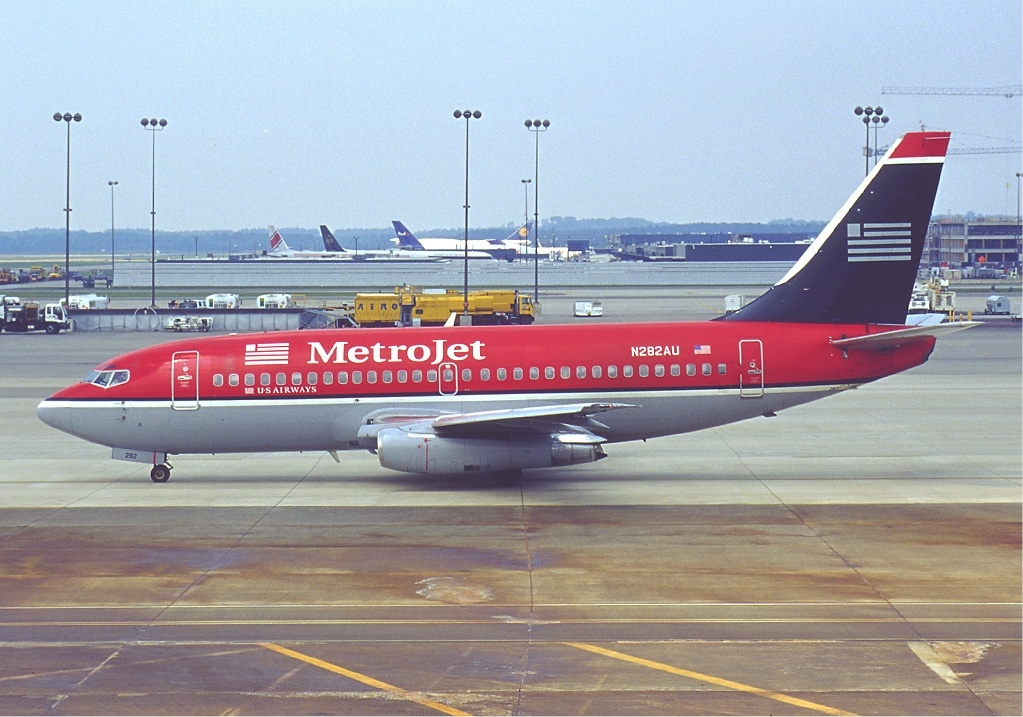
Boeing 737-200 in MetroJet livery (1998–2001)

That same year, the airline also introduced a single-class subsidiary known as MetroJet, which competed with low-cost carriers like Southwest Airlines expanding to the East. MetroJet operated Boeing 737-200s, the oldest aircraft in the fleet, allowing it to achieve the best utilization possible before being retired.

On November 6, 1996, immediately prior to the rebranding to US Airways, the airline placed an order for up to 400 Airbus A320-series narrow-body aircraft, with 120 firm orders at the time of signing. The order was regarded as the largest bulk aircraft request in history. In 1998 the airline followed with an order for up to 30 Airbus A330-series wide-body aircraft, with an initial firm order for seven of the Airbus A330-300s. These orders enabled US Airways to replace its older aircraft with newer, more efficient aircraft.

In 1997 US Airways bought the remains of US Airways Shuttle. US Airways expanded its flights to Europe through the end of the decade. Although the airline returned to profitability in the mid-1990s, its route network's concentration in the Northeastern United States and high operating costs prompted calls for the company to merge with another airline.

=== 2000s ===
==== 2000–2004: September 11 and financial woes ====
Beginning in 2000 US Airways started retiring aircraft in an attempt to simplify its fleet and reduce costs, replacing many of its older planes with the new Airbus A320-family aircraft. On March 30, 2000, US Airways received its first Airbus A330-300.

On May 24, 2000, US Airways announced plans to be acquired for $4.3 billion by UAL Corp., the parent company of United Airlines, the world's largest commercial carrier at the time. The complex deal drew immediate objections from labor unions, consumer advocates and antitrust regulators. Negotiations stalled; with both airlines losing money and the deal all but certain to be blocked by the federal government, UAL withdrew its purchase offer on July 27, 2001, paying US Airways a $50 million penalty for withdrawing from the deal.

As the largest carrier at Washington National Airport, US Airways was disproportionately affected by that airport's extended closure following the September 11 terrorist attacks. The resulting financial disaster precipitated the closure of the airline's MetroJet network, which led to the closing of the subsidiary's primary operating base at Baltimore-Washington International Airport and the furloughing of thousands of employees. The airline entered Chapter 11 bankruptcy on August 11, 2002, but received a government-guaranteed loan through the Air Transportation Stabilization Board and was able to exit bankruptcy in 2003 after a relatively short period. The airline made major cost reductions during its bankruptcy, but it still encountered higher-than-average per-seat-mile costs.

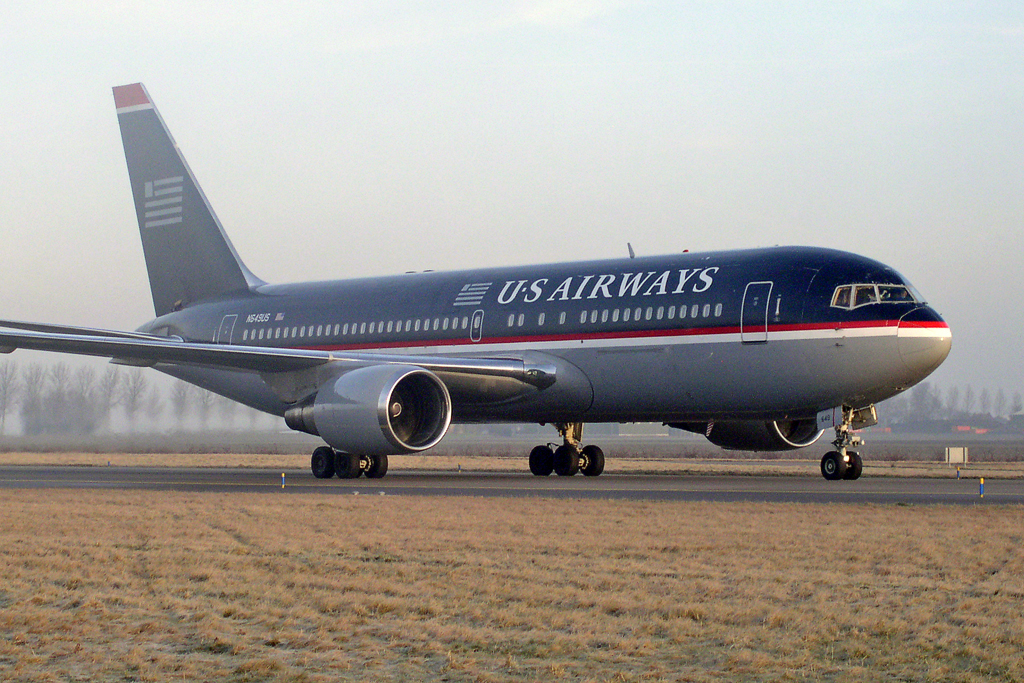
A Boeing 767-200 before the America West merger

In 2003, US Airways began exploring the availability of financing and merger partners, and after no financing was available, it filed for Chapter 11 bankruptcy again in 2004 for the second time in two years. The airline merged in 2005 with America West Airlines. Under terms of the merger agreement, the America West board of directors created two new entities. First, a new "US Airways Group" was created to receive the bankrupt US Airways' assets and form the new corporation. Second, "America West Holdings" was merged into "Barbell Acquisition Corporation", a subsidiary of the new "US Airways Group", on September 27, 2005; through this transaction, "America West Holdings" became a wholly owned subsidiary of the new "US Airways Group". The "America West Holdings" stockholders were required to authorize these changes. Upon completion, 37% of the new "US Airways Group" would be owned by "America West Holdings" stockholders, 11% by the old "US Airways Group" debtholders and 52% by new equity investors. The result was the fifth largest US-based airline in terms of revenue. The merger was completed on November 4, 2007. While America West was the nominal survivor, the merged airline retained the US Airways name, since studies indicated that "US Airways" had better brand recognition worldwide than did "America West".

In early 2003, US Airways management liquidated the pensions of its 6,000 pilots by releasing their pensions into the federal pension program Pension Benefit Guaranty Corporation. The company was one of the first major airlines to eliminate pilots' pensions in order to cut costs.

Following a trial run of selling in-flight food in 2003, US Airways discontinued free meal service on domestic flights later that year.

==== 2003–2004: Pittsburgh hub conflict ====
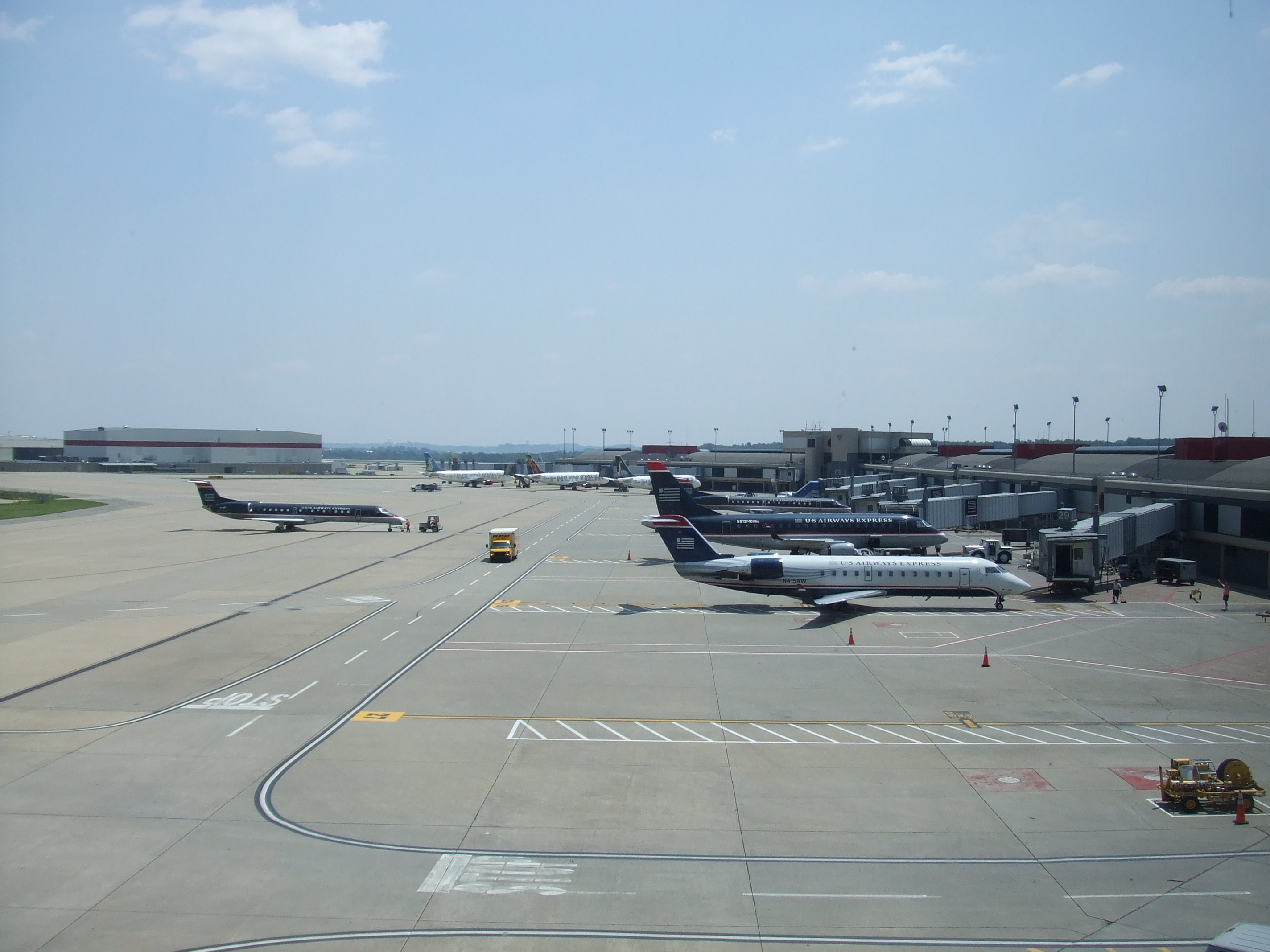
US Airways operations in Pittsburgh following hub elimination (2007)

In late 2003-early 2004, US Airways lobbied for lower operating fees at Pittsburgh International Airport, citing its economies of scale as the primary carrier and largest tenant at the airport. US Airways attempted to leverage its adverse cash position and "red ink" in the years following 9/11 to negotiate better financial terms with the airport. The Allegheny County Airport Authority rejected US Airways' demands for reduced landing fees and lower lease payments, in part due to antitrust and FAA regulations that required the airport operator to extend the same financial terms to all carriers if it accepted US Airways' demands. US Airways threatened to move traffic to rival hubs in Philadelphia and Charlotte, and the airline made good on its threat in November 2004, reducing its flights at Pittsburgh International Airport from primary-hub to secondary-hub status. This action also resulted in the closing of the commuter terminal, also known as concourse E. The airline, led by former ExpressJet Airlines CEO David N. Siegel, continued to demote Pittsburgh International Airport in subsequent years until it became only a focus city airport for the company. By 2010, Pittsburgh was no longer listed as a US Airways focus city. US Airways now operated an average of only 39 departures a day exclusively to domestic destinations, compared to 2001 when it was a hub with 500+ flights a day with service across the United States and to Europe.

==== 2004–2005 ====
In August 2004, US Airways attempted to build a Latin American gateway at Ft. Lauderdale/Hollywood, announcing service to 10 cities in Latin America and the Caribbean. The attempt was largely unsuccessful and short-lived, in part due to Fort Lauderdale's proximity to American Airlines' hub at Miami International Airport and its extensive Latin American network. US Airways also began a process of de-emphasizing its hub-and-spoke system to capitalize on direct flights between major eastern airports such as Washington National Airport and New York-LaGuardia.

The airline became the 15th member of Star Alliance on May 4, 2004.

Fuel costs and deadlocked negotiations with organized labor, chiefly the Air Line Pilots Association, traditionally the first group to come to a concessionary agreement, forced US Airways into a second round of Chapter 11 bankruptcy protection proceedings on September 12, 2004. Widespread employee discontent and a high volume of employee sick calls were blamed by the airline for a staff shortage around the 2004 Christmas holiday, a public relations disaster which led to speculation that the airline could be liquidated; the USDOT found that the problems were caused primarily by poor airline management.

==== US Airways/America West merger ====
Even before the second bankruptcy filing of 2004, one of the alternatives US Airways Group explored was a possible merger with America West, as the two airlines had complementary networks and similar labor costs. The parties held preliminary discussions and conducted due diligence from February through July 2004. Ultimately, these talks ended due to issues related to labor, pension, and benefit costs.

By December 2004, US Airways had cut labor costs significantly. Its investment adviser, the Seabury Group, suggested putting the airline up for sale. The following month, US Airways Group and America West Holdings resumed their discussions. On May 19, 2005, both airlines officially announced the merger deal, structured as a reverse takeover. Financing for the deal was supplied by outside investors included Airbus, Air Wisconsin (a US Airways Express operator), and ACE Aviation Holdings, the parent company of Air Canada. The merged airline retained the US Airways name to emphasize its national scope, as well as to capitalize on US Airways' worldwide recognition, Dividend Miles frequent flyer program, and Star Alliance membership. On September 13, 2005, America West shareholders voted to approve the merger agreement and three days later the U.S. Bankruptcy Court for the Eastern District of Virginia approved US Airways' emergence from bankruptcy, allowing the merger to close on September 27.

Since the merger, US Airways had been headquartered at the former America West corporate offices in Tempe, Arizona, and America West executives and board members were largely in control of the merged company. The company's aircraft merged FAA operating certificate included America West's airline call sign and identifiers "CACTUS" and "AWE".

==== Post-2005 merger ====
During 2006, the airline began consolidating its operations under the US Airways brand. Operations were not fully integrated until October 2008, when government approval was obtained to allow the airlines to operate under a single operating certificate.

In May 2006, the US Airways and America West web sites were merged. The new US Airways web site united the two brands using graphics and styles reflective of the airline's new livery and services.

In July 2006, US Airways and America West ordered 20 new Airbus A350 aircraft.

In December 2006, US Airways became the first American "legacy" carrier to add the Embraer 190 to its mainline fleet. It remains one of only three mainline American carriers to have operated the E190 in scheduled service, JetBlue (who retired their E190 fleet in 2025) and Breeze being the others.

At the end of 2006, US Airways made a bid for competitor Delta Air Lines, which it opposed, treating it as a hostile takeover by US Airways. The final bid was valued at $10 billion but was withdrawn on January 31, 2007, since US Airways failed to secure backing from Delta's creditors. The airline stated that it would no longer pursue a possible takeover of Delta.

Aircraft were equipped with Verizon Airfone in every row of seats. When Verizon ended the service, the airline deactivated the service and removed the phones in all aircraft by 2007.

Overnight on March 4, 2007, the US Airways and America West computer reservation systems merged. US Airways, which previously used the Sabre airline computer system, switched to the new QIK system, an overlay for the SHARES system that had been used by America West. A few of the features from the Sabre system were incorporated into the new joint system, with the most prominent being the continued utilization of the Sabre ramp partition "DECS" for all computer functions related to weight and balance, aircraft loading and technical flight tracking within the company.

America West Airlines and US Airways merged FAA certificates on September 25, 2007. Former America West employees (including pilots, fleet service personnel, flight attendants) remained on their original America West union contracts and did not fully combine workforces with their pre-merger US Airways counterparts. Until October 2008, former America West aircraft flew with their respective crews and used the call sign "CACTUS", while the pre-merger US Airways crews primarily flew with their respective aircraft and used the call sign "US AIR". In October 2008, the company began operating under a single operating certificate (that of the former US Airways). This required operation under a single call sign and identifier and that of America West ("CACTUS" and "AWE") were chosen as a sign of the company lineage. In addition, flights operated using former America West aircraft and crews were numbered 1–699, whereas flights operated by pre-merger US Airways aircraft and crews were numbered 700–1999. (Flights numbered 2000–2199 were shuttle services and those 2200 and higher were operated by express subsidiaries.) Aircraft operated by pre-merger US Airways crews or former America West crews flew under two different United States Department of Transportation operating certificates until September 25, 2007. However, until pilot and flight attendant union groups from both sides successfully negotiated a single contract, each group of crewmembers would fly only on its pre-merger airlines' aircraft and the flights would be marked accordingly.

Since the computer systems were merged, former America West-operated flights were marketed as though America West was a wholly owned carrier. This marketing is common practice for airlines that have code-share agreements with other airlines operating aircraft for feeder or regional routes and although the practice is uncommon for major airlines, it greatly simplified the process for passengers connecting between historically US Airways-operated flights and former America West-operated flights.

In the summer of 2007, US Airways began upgrading its in-flight services, from food and entertainment to the training of flight attendants. The airline was planning to test-market a new seatback entertainment system in early 2008, however, the 2008 financial crisis ended those plans. As a further result of the skyrocketing fuel costs, the airline rolled back the planned summer 2007 service upgrades as well as ending its existing in-flight entertainment on all domestic routes.

==== 2007 ====
A Consumer Reports survey of 23,000 readers in June 2007 ranked US Airways as the worst airline for customer satisfaction. The survey was conducted before the airline's March 2007 service disruptions. A follow-up survey polling a smaller sample size, conducted in April, found that US Airways remained in last place, with its score dropping an additional 10 points. Also in 2007, the Today/Zagat Airline Survey rated US Airways as the worst airline overall in the United States, ranking it 10/30 for comfort, 5/30 for food, 10/30 for service and 15/30 for its online reservations system.

On August 1, 2008, US Airways ceased providing free drinks; passengers could buy bottled water or soda for $2 or coffee and tea for $1. Shuttle flights between LGA, DCA and BOS continued to offer free beverages. US Airways resumed serving complimentary drinks in March 2009.

US Airways ranked last out of 20 domestic airline carriers for on-time performance in March, April, and May 2007, according to DOT figures. According to the Bureau of Transportation Statistics June 2008 report (using data from May 2008), US Airways ranked seventh for percentage of on-time arrivals.

US Airways was the leader in service complaints with 4.4 complaints per 100,000 customers. The US Airways rate of customer complaints was 7.5 times the rate of JetBlue (0.59 complaints per 100,000 customers) and 11 times the rate of Southwest Airlines (0.4 complaints per 100,000 customers). US Airways had a very poor record of addressing customer complaints, answering only 50% of the telephone calls to its customer service department.

By September 2007, US Airways continued to downgrade Pittsburgh International Airport's status from 500 flights a day (with 12,000 employees) in 2001 to just 68 flights a day (with only 1,800 employees). CEO Parker stated his frustration at the economics of Pittsburgh and referred to the possibility of service further decreasing. This represented a further deterioration of a strained relationship with Allegheny County, with which the airline shared significant historical ties. US Airways Group Inc. said October 3, 2007 it would cut mainline flights at Pittsburgh International Airport to 22 a day from 31 and reduce regional flights to 46 a day from 77, beginning January 6, 2008, essentially reducing the airport to a destination spoke in its network. Pittsburgh was no longer a focus city for the airline as of its most recent annual report and January 2008 flight schedule reductions.

==== 2008 ====
US Airways East pilots took steps to relinquish their ALPA membership and form their own in-house union. "East" pilots were dissatisfied with the results of binding arbitration when the arbitrator's ruling placed all active former America West pilots, including their most junior pilot, who had been hired only three months previous to the merger, ahead of furloughed US Airways pilots with up to seventeen years of service. The former US Airways pilots petitioned the National Mediation Board to conduct a vote to determine whether to replace their union. East pilots (3,200) outnumbered west pilots (1,800) and the proposed union's president stated that the union had a sufficient number of requests to call a vote according to National Mediation Board regulations. The new union would be called the US Airline Pilots Association (USAPA). On April 17, 2008, USAPA was voted in as the sole bargaining agent for the pilots of US Airways, East and West.

It took more than a year to correct problems stemming from the merger and by 2008, US Airways was one of the best performers among the legacy carriers. The carrier had the best departure and arrival performances among the other major US carriers. Because of the strong On-Time departure and On-Time arrival performances, it was the number one major carrier. Northwest was the only other carrier that had better performances but became a part of Delta during that year.

On April 25, 2008, it was reported that US Airways was in talks to merge its operations with either American Airlines or United Airlines, partially as a response to the recent Delta Air Lines and Northwest Airlines merger. Then, on April 28, 2008, reports stated that US Airways would announce its intent to merge with United within two weeks. At the end of May 2008, the airline announced that merger talks were formally ended.

On May 20, 2008, according to the annual American Customer Satisfaction Index by the University of Michigan, US Airways ranked last in customer satisfaction among the major airlines. However, it was making steady ground to bridge its gap with other airlines. In late 2008, US Airways closed its Las Vegas hub, which was part of the America West network.

==== 2009 ====
Coast Guard video (8:07 long) of the crash and rescue; splashdown is at 3:31:02 pm

On January 15, 2009, an Airbus A320 registered N106US, Flight 1549 under the command of Captain Chesley Sullenberger, flying from New York City's LaGuardia Airport to Charlotte Douglas International Airport, ditched into the Hudson River shortly after takeoff. Multiple bird hits from a flock of Canada geese caused both engines to lose power. All 150 passengers and 5 crew members (2 pilots and 3 flight attendants) survived. New York's Governor David Paterson called it "the miracle on the Hudson".

US Airways received its first Airbus A330-200 in June 2009.

In mid-2009 it was reported that US Airways, along with American Airlines and United Airlines was placed under credit watch. Experts say several factors, including capital and revenue, played a role in the airline's addition to the list. On October 2, US Airways reported that it had a buyer for 10 of its 25 Embraer 190 Aircraft. The remaining 15 aircraft were scheduled to be redeployed to Boston where they would operate Boston to Philadelphia and the Boston to New York LaGuardia leg of the US Airways Shuttle service. On December 8, 2009, US Airways began service to Rio de Janeiro-Galeão airport operated by a Boeing 767-200, its first route to South America.

=== 2010s ===
The airline continued to operate scheduled flights and profits were seen to be sustainable. The airline was in good shape. 2010 was a better year for the airline due to no recorded incidents or accidents following the ditching of flight 1549 the previous year. The airline was profitable up to the merging with American Airlines in 2015.

==== 2010 ====
US Airways cut many routes to close its focus cities at Las Vegas, Boston, and New York LaGuardia. The airline was given tentative government approval to trade many of its LaGuardia takeoff and landing slots to Delta Air Lines in exchange for Delta's slots at Washington National. This exchange would strengthen each airline's presence at both airports. The DOT gave approval pending the carriers selling a small percentage of their routes to other carriers. US Airways and Delta disagreed with the decision and said they planned to sue the US DOT.

On April 7, 2010, The New York Times reported that US Airways was "deep in merger discussions" with United Airlines. The report stated that a deal would not be reached for several weeks, but indicated that a deal was close. Several weeks later, however, on April 22, 2010, the airline ended discussions with United regarding the merger. Shortly thereafter, United announced that it would merge with Continental Airlines instead.

==== 2011 ====
In April 2011, US Airways earned the top spot in the 2011 Airline Quality Rating (AQR) report among "Big-Five" hub-and-spoke carriers. US Airways President Scott Kirby said that US Airways was the last viable airline in the U.S. to merge and that any potential merger would be with one of three U.S. carriers: United Airlines, American Airlines or Delta Air Lines. Kirby also commented that US Airways' membership in Star Alliance would make a merger with United Airlines easier, but added that "it's not meaningful enough to really be a factor". Among the 10 largest domestic airlines, consumers scored US Airways last for overall customer satisfaction in a May 2011 Consumer Reports survey.

In May 2011, Business Insider reported that American Customer Satisfaction Index (ACSI) ranked US Airways sixth in a list of "The 19 Most Hated Companies in America".

In July 2011, the pilots' union, USAPA, purchased a full-page advertisement in USA Today, questioning US Airways management's commitment to safety. US Airways transmitted a communication to all of its employees, on the same day as the ad, denying the accusations. In September 2011, US Airways requested and was granted an injunction against the pilots, claiming the pilots union, USAPA, was using their commitment to safety as a negotiating tactic.

==== 2012 ====
In January 2012, US Airways expressed interest in taking over bankrupt carrier American Airlines. Tom Horton, CEO of American parent AMR Corporation, said in March that American was open to a merger. A Bloomberg News report dated March 23, 2012, stated that US Airways had been in talks with AMR's creditors about a takeover bid. On December 7, 2012, US Airways announced a merger proposal with American Airlines. The merger required approval from a bankruptcy judge, which was successful. The combined airline would keep the American Airlines name and would be based in American's hometown of Fort Worth.

==== 2013 ====
On February 14, 2013, US Airways Group and AMR Corporation announced that the two companies would merge to form the largest airline in the world. In the deal, shareholders of AMR would own 72% of the new company and US Airways Group shareholders would own the remaining 28%. The combined airline would carry the American Airlines name and branding, while US Airways' management team, including CEO Doug Parker, would retain most operational management positions. The headquarters for the new airline would also be consolidated at American's current headquarters in Fort Worth, Texas. On August 13, 2013, the United States Department of Justice along with attorneys general from six states and the District of Columbia filed a lawsuit seeking to block the merger, arguing that it would mean less competition and higher prices. Arizona, Florida, Pennsylvania, Texas, and Virginia, states where either American or US Airways maintained a large presence, were among the plaintiffs in the lawsuit, as was Tennessee.

On November 12, 2013, the two companies reached a deal with the Department of Justice. That allowed the companies to complete the merger on December 9, 2013.

==== Final years and ceasing operations ====
On April 8, 2015, American Airlines flights operated by US Airways retired the Cactus callsign used by US Airways since the America West merger. The final flight to use it was Flight 774 from London-Heathrow to Philadelphia.

On July 13, 2015, American announced that it planned to discontinue the US Airways brand name on October 17, 2015. On that date, US Airways made its final flight: Flight 1939 (originally named Flight 434, changed for the year the airline was founded), using an Airbus A321 registered N152UW, and would take off as US Airways Flight 1939 and land as American Airlines Flight 1939. The flight originated from Philadelphia International Airport at 10:05 AM, October 16, 2015, continuing to Charlotte Douglas International Airport, then to Phoenix Sky Harbor International Airport, and then to San Francisco International Airport. The aircraft made its final leg on the evening of October 16, as a red-eye flight from San Francisco International Airport back to Philadelphia International Airport. It landed ahead of schedule at 5:52 AM EDT, and at that point, the US Airways brand and all operations under its name were officially terminated.

== Company affairs and identity ==
=== Headquarters ===
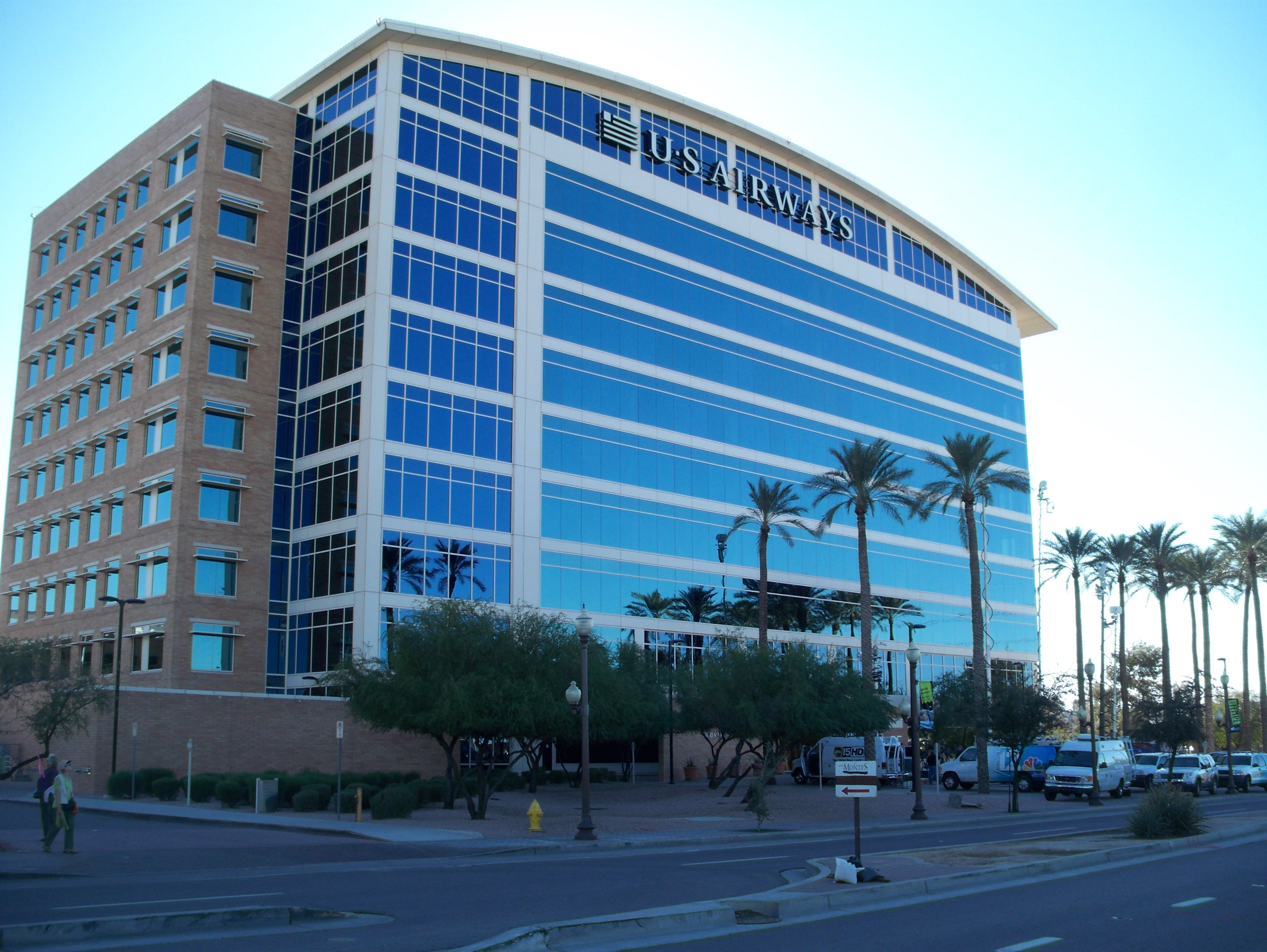
US Airways headquarters in Tempe, Arizona, formerly the America West Airlines headquarters until merger

Prior to the merger with American Airlines, US Airways had its headquarters in Tempe, Arizona, in Greater Phoenix. The nine-story, 225,000-square-foot (20,900 m^{2}) building was originally occupied by America West Airlines. Jahna Berry of the Arizona Business Gazette said in 2005 that the building "is one of the dominant buildings in downtown Tempe". It is located in proximity to the southwest intersection of Rio Salado Parkway and Mill Avenue. The city of Tempe gave America West $11 million in incentives and tax breaks so it would occupy what became the US Airways headquarters, which cost $37 million to construct.

Construction began in January 1998, although the official groundbreaking ceremony was held on February 19 of that year. By of 2006 over 700 employees worked in the building. On May 31, 2013, W.P. Carey Inc. gave 75% interest in the US Airways headquarters to Parkway Properties Inc. for $41.8 million or $185 per square foot. As of December 2013, 780 employees worked in the building. After the merger between American Airlines and US Airways concluded, Hayley Ringle of the Phoenix Business Journal stated in December 2013 that the facility became "just a large office of American Airlines Group". That month, John McDonald, the American Airlines vice president of corporate communications and public affairs stated that the US Airways headquarters would continue to be used for at least five years and for the time being most of the employees at the US Airways headquarters would remain.

Previously US Airways had its headquarters in Crystal Park Four, a class A mixed-use development in Crystal City, Arlington County, Virginia, near Washington, D.C. Park Four is between Reagan National Airport, the Pentagon, and the District of Columbia. After the merger with America West Airlines, the company decided to close its Virginia headquarters and moved the employees into the former America West building in three to six months after the merger closed. Russell Grantham at The Atlanta Journal-Constitution said that the decision to move the headquarters to Tempe was not that difficult because the Crystal City facility "consisted of like two or three floors of people."

=== Flight Operations Center ===
Pittsburgh International Airport won a three-way competition with Phoenix and Charlotte in 2007 for the right to continue as US Airways' Global Flight Operations center. Opening in November 2008, US Airways invested more than $25 million ($37.4 million today) into a 72,000-square-foot (6,700 m^{2}) facility. It replaced a smaller 11-year-old (pre-merger) operations center closer to downtown Pittsburgh. The state-of-the-art Ops Center opened ahead of schedule and was home to approximately 600 employees. It served as the nerve center for all of US Airways' nearly 1,400 daily mainline flights. As part of its merger with American Airlines, the airline intended to close the flight operations center and would consolidate with the American Airlines Integrated Flight Operations Center near Dallas/Fort Worth International Airport, the headquarters of American Airlines. The move was expected to take within 18 months. It was announced that the operations center would close on August 23, 2015.

=== Community support ===
==== Do Crew ====
The US Airways Do Crew program was the airline's employee community-service program. Employee volunteers in the program participated in community-based projects on a monthly basis through local chapters in Boston, Charlotte, Las Vegas, New York City, Philadelphia, Phoenix, Pittsburgh, Washington, D.C., and Winston-Salem, North Carolina.

=== Livery ===
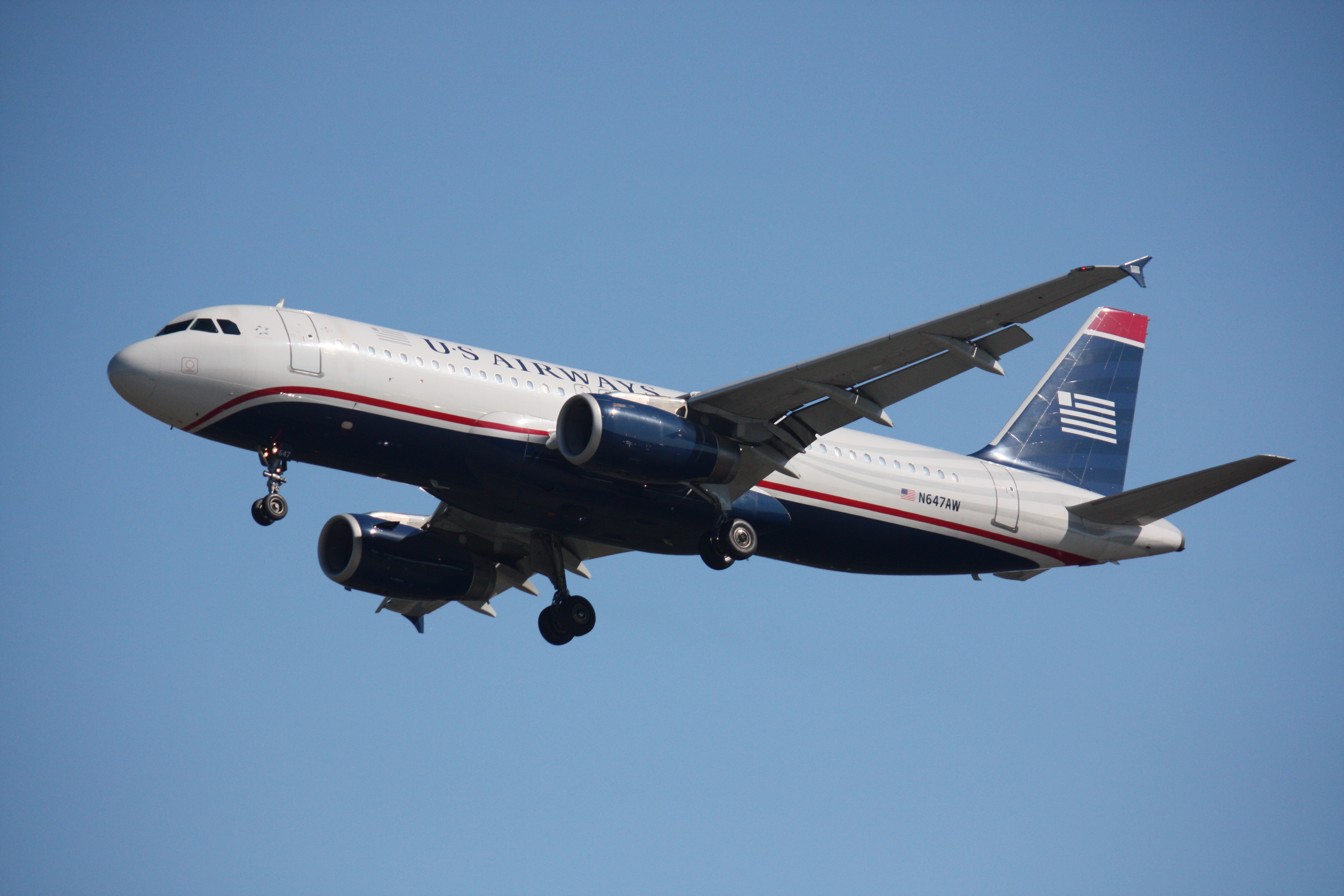
US Airways Airbus A320

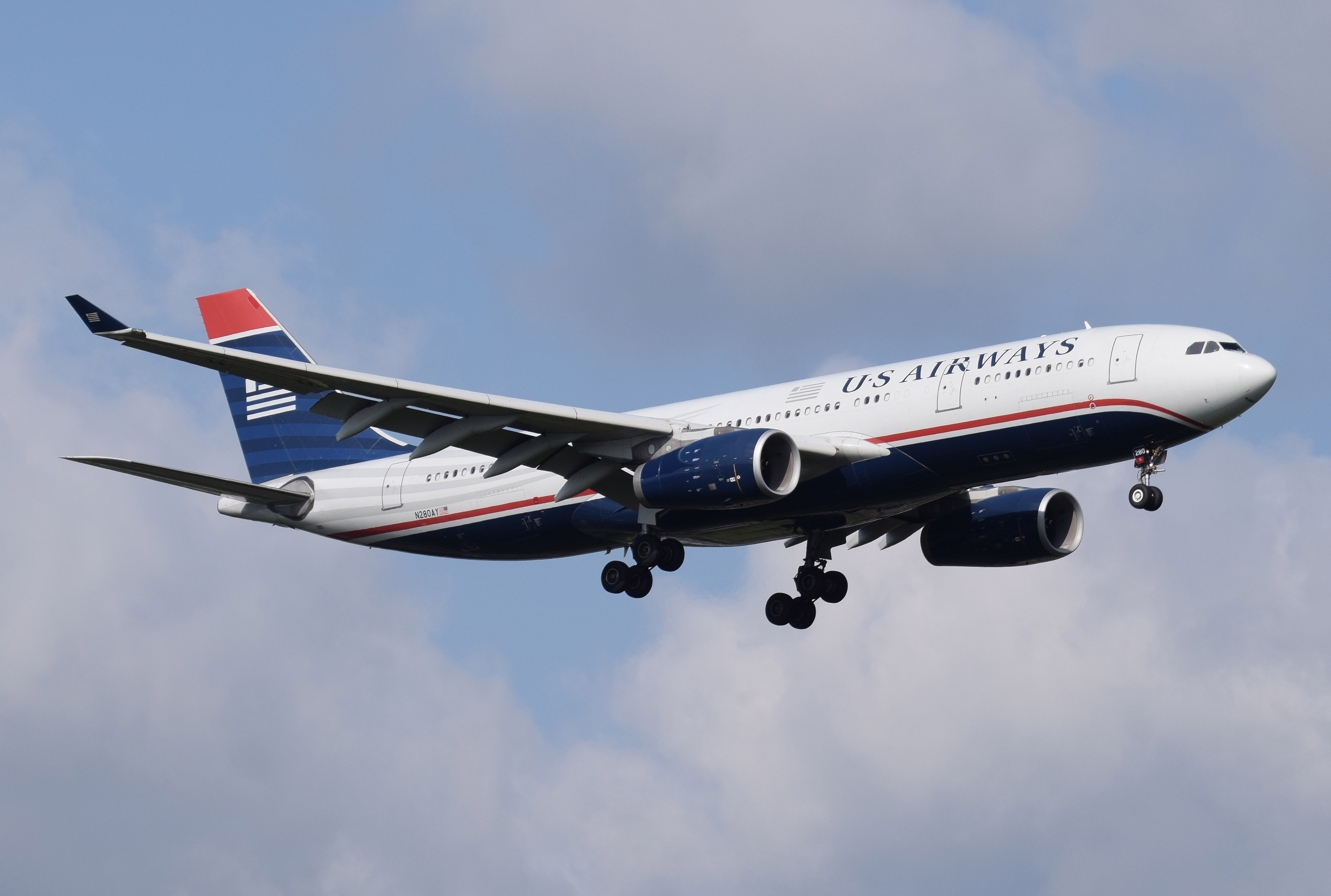
US Airways Airbus A330-200

US Airways had various liveries under the US Airways name. In general, the Express and Shuttle divisions had liveries that closely paralleled the company-wide livery, but later shared the same aircraft with mainline US Airways.

The pre-2005 US Airways had a dark blue livery; after it merged with America West, US Airways, switched to a mostly white livery.

Following US Airways merger with American Airlines, US Airways aircraft were painted into the American Airlines livery. The first jet to re-enter revenue service in the American livery in January 2014 was an Airbus A319, tail number N700UW, which previously sported a Star Alliance scheme.

One aircraft, an Airbus A321 under registration N578UW, has been left painted in the US Airways livery, as one of American's heritage aircraft. The actual US Airways logo near the front of the fuselage has been replaced with the American Airlines logo, but the rest of the aircraft remains in the US Airways livery.

== Destinations ==
US Airways hubs listed by departures (Average as of 4Q13)
Rank	Airport	Flights
1	Charlotte, North Carolina	613
2	Philadelphia, Pennsylvania	429
3	Phoenix, Arizona	255
4	Washington, D.C. – Ronald Reagan Washington National	222

US Airways operated 3,031 flights a day to 193 destinations in 24 countries from its hubs in Phoenix, Charlotte, and Philadelphia.

US Airways' routes were concentrated along the East Coast of the United States, Southwestern United States, and the Caribbean, with a number of routes serving Europe and primary destinations along the U.S. West Coast. The airline's western U.S. presence had increased following the merger with America West. Codesharing with United Airlines (before leaving Star Alliance) had helped US Airways by enabling the airline to offer its customers service throughout the Midwest, Great Plains, and Rocky Mountains states. Services to South America, Asia, and Australia also were offered via the American Airlines codeshare. Likewise, American passengers benefitted from increased access via US Airways to the U.S. East Coast, Europe, and the Caribbean. US Airways Express carriers operated a large number of domestic routes, primarily into US Airways' hubs and focus cities, but with some exceptions, particularly small markets where the regional express carriers operated service under the EAS program, as well as some point-to-point commuter routes in the Northeast and Mid-Atlantic regions and south through the Carolinas. Before US Airways completely merged into American Airlines, US Airways was the last and only major US airline that has never flown to Eastern Asia, although it had codeshares with American Airlines and most Asian air carriers partnered in OneWorld Alliance.

In 2007 the airline applied for flights to Bogotá, Colombia, but the U.S. Department of Transportation denied the application after the agency awarded Delta Air Lines, JetBlue, and Spirit Airlines the routes from Delta's New York-JFK hub, JetBlue from Orlando and Spirit from Fort Lauderdale.

In 2008, US Airways and other airlines struggled with the price of fuel. Despite that, US Airways CEO Doug Parker said "It [Philadelphia] is our international gateway. We'd like to expand that". Service to London Heathrow Airport began in March 2008. The airline also added three international flights during the summer of 2009, including Tel Aviv, from Philadelphia. US Airways also started year-round service between Charlotte and Rio de Janeiro, which was discontinued in early 2015.

In 2009 US Airways and Delta reached an agreement to exchange landing/takeoff slots at LaGuardia Airport and Ronald Reagan Washington National Airport. US Airways also planned to receive additional route authority to São Paulo from Delta as a result of this transaction. Service to São Paulo from its Charlotte hub was discontinued on October 1, 2014.

On November 21, 2012, the airline was awarded a landing slot at London Heathrow Airport for nonstop flights between Charlotte and London Heathrow, complementing the existing route from Philadelphia to London Heathrow. The airline began service from Charlotte to Heathrow on March 30, 2013, replacing its service from Charlotte to Gatwick, which ended the airline's service at Gatwick.

=== Codeshare agreements ===
Throughout its existence, US Airways had codeshare agreements with the following airlines:

- Adria Airways (ended with US Airways' withdrawal from Star Alliance)
- Aegean Airlines (ended with US Airways' withdrawal from Star Alliance)
- Air Berlin
- Air China (ended with US Airways' withdrawal from Star Alliance)
- Air New Zealand (ended with US Airways' withdrawal from Star Alliance)
- All Nippon Airways (ended with US Airways' withdrawal from Star Alliance)
- American Airlines (Merger partner)
- Asiana Airlines (ended with US Airways' withdrawal from Star Alliance)
- Avianca (ended with US Airways' withdrawal from Star Alliance)
- Bahamasair
- Big Sky Airlines (ceased operations March 8, 2008)
- British Airways
- British Midland International
- Brussels Airlines (ended with US Airways' withdrawal from Star Alliance)
- Bulgaria Air
- Caribbean Sun (ceased to exist when the airline shut down on January 31, 2007)
- Continental Airlines (codeshared with America West Airlines and ended the agreement on May 1, 2002, citing low code-shared flight sales; Continental resumed its reciprocal frequent flyer agreement on October 25, 2009, when it joined the Star Alliance and ended the agreement in 2012 when it merged with United)
- Croatia Airlines (ended with US Airways' withdrawal from Star Alliance)
- EVA Air (ended with US Airways' withdrawal from Star Alliance)
- Finnair
- Hawaiian Airlines (Hawaii inter-island routes only)
- Iberia
- Lufthansa (ended with US Airways' withdrawal from Star Alliance)
- Qantas (codeshared with both US Airways in the 1990s and America West Airlines before the merger; and after the merger with the combined US Airways/America West Airlines and ended the agreement February 28, 2007 due to Qantas being in the competing Oneworld airline alliance)
- Qatar Airways
- Royal Jordanian
- Singapore Airlines
- South African Airways (ended with US Airways' withdrawal from Star Alliance)
- Spanair (ended with Spanair's collapse in January 2012)
- Swiss International Air Lines (ended with US Airways' withdrawal from Star Alliance)
- TACA Airlines
- TAM Airlines
- TAP Air Portugal (ended with US Airways' withdrawal from Star Alliance)
- Turkish Airlines (ended with US Airways' withdrawal from Star Alliance)
- United Airlines (ended with US Airways' withdrawal from Star Alliance)
- Virgin Atlantic
- Winair

== Fleet ==
By mid-2014, US Airways maintained a predominantly Airbus fleet, with some Boeing jets and a small fleet of Embraer jets. The post-merger US Airways continued to operate the largest fleet of Airbus aircraft in the world.

Subsidiaries Piedmont and PSA exclusively flew Bombardier CRJs (PSA), and de Havilland Canada Dash 8s (Piedmont).

== Cabin ==
=== Envoy ===
Envoy was US Airways' international business class product. It was offered on all Airbus A330s and Boeing 767-200ERs, as well as select Boeing 757-200s. There were three types of Envoy seating in the US Airways fleet:

- Fully flat suites in a reverse herringbone 1–2–1 configuration were found on all Airbus A330s. These were the Cirrus model designed by Sicma Aeroseat and featured a fully flat semi-private "pod".
- Internationally configured Boeing 757-200s and all 767-200ERs featured deep recline cradle seats with around 165 degrees of recline.

Previously, the first row of all Airbus A330-300s were fully flat seats, formerly US Airways' international first class product. With the transition from three- to two-class international service, these seats were, for a time, offered at a fee to Envoy customers.

Every seat had a personal on-demand video screen either attached to the arm rest or as a portable unit passed out by the crew that offered movies, games and syndicated television shows in multiple languages. There was also an EmPower or AC outlet at each seat.

The airline offered complimentary food and beverage service for all Envoy passengers.

=== First Class ===
First Class was offered on all domestically configured aircraft. Seat pitch ranged from 35 to 38 inches (89 to 97 cm) and a seat width ranging from 20 to 21 inches (51 to 53 cm). Free wine, beer and spirits and a snack basket were offered on all flights, as were blankets. Meals were provided on flights of 2.5 hours or longer.

=== Main Cabin ===
Main Cabin (Economy Class) was available on all aircraft, with a seat pitch ranging from 30 to 33 inches (76 to 84 cm) and a seat width ranging from 17 to 18 inches (43 to 46 cm). Domestic service was a buy-on-board program with full meals available for purchase on flights of 3.5 hours or longer, while shorter flights offered snack boxes. Coffee, tea and soft drinks were complimentary with alcohol available for purchase. Transatlantic and South American flights included standard meals and beverages (including wine) free of charge, with premium meals available for purchase, which included one alcoholic beverage.

=== Inflight entertainment ===
US Airways offered GoGo Inflight Internet on Airbus A319/A320/A321 and Embraer 170/175/190 aircraft. US Airways had also signed up for GoGo Vision streaming video service which would be available on all GoGo equipped aircraft. Flights to Europe, South America, Hawaii, and domestic flights over 700 miles (1,100 km) operated with Boeing aircraft featured movies and TV episodes on overhead screens in Coach. The Airbus A330s featured AVOD at every seat in both Economy and Business Class with a selection of movies, TV episodes, music, and games. Complimentary headsets were available in both Business and Economy on flights to Europe, South America, and the Middle East.

GoGo was usually priced US$5–15 on domestic flights. It was never available on international flights.

== Dividend Miles ==
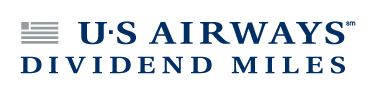

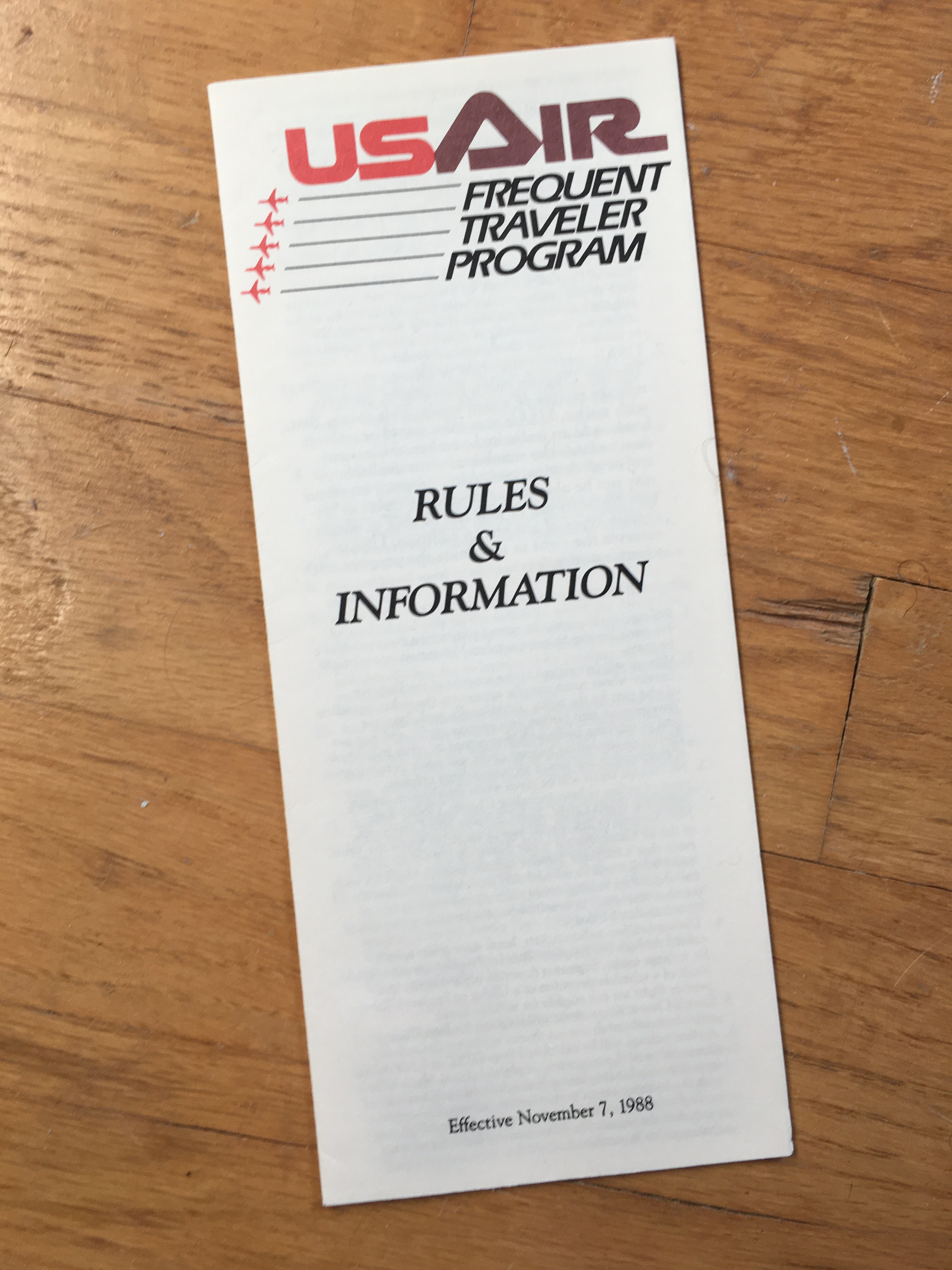
Pamphlet for earlier USAir program, 1988

Dividend Miles was US Airways Group's frequent-flyer program. Members earned one mile for every mile flown on US Airways on any published fare – paid flights taken in First Class or Envoy received a 50% mileage bonus. Members also earned miles on flights on partner airlines and for partner hotel stays, car rentals, shopping at the Dividend Miles mall and for purchases made with a US Airways credit card. Miles could be redeemed for free flights, upgrades, and more. Dividend Miles was to be absorbed into American Airlines's AAdvantage program in the second quarter of 2015. However, American Airlines announced on March 13, 2015, that Dividend Miles would be merged into American's AAdvantage program "within the next 30 days". On March 24, 2015, it was confirmed that Dividend Miles would be absorbed into American's AAdvantage program on March 28, 2015. On March 28, 2015, Dividend Miles was officially absorbed into American Airlines's AAdvantage program.

In addition to its US Airways Express and Oneworld partnerships, the Dividend Miles program with other partner airlines or programs included:

- Aegean Airlines
- Air China
- Hawaiian Airlines
- Jet Airways
- Shenzhen Airlines
- South African Airways
- TAP Portugal
- Turkish Airlines

== Airport lounges ==
=== US Airways Club ===
US Airways' airport lounge was called the US Airways Club. There were 19 lounges in 13 airports across the United States. As part of the merger, all US Airways clubs were gradually rebranded as American's Admirals Clubs in 2014, except for a few that closed.

In addition to those with paid memberships, the following customers also had complimentary access to Admirals Club locations:

- Passengers traveling in Business Class (renamed from Envoy Class) on an international flight
- Oneworld Emerald and Sapphire members, except American's AAdvantage members and US Airways Dividend Miles members who were travelling domestically.

=== Envoy Lounge ===
Philadelphia International Airport's Terminal A formerly had an Envoy Lounge reserved exclusively for Envoy Class, Star Alliance international premium passengers, and Star Alliance Gold members traveling on long-haul international flights. Due to the lounge's proximity to departing long-haul international flights, this lounge offered a much wider array of food than was typically found at US Airways Clubs. In 2011, the airline converted the Envoy Lounge into a standard US Airways Club, now an Admirals Club.

== Accidents and incidents ==
The incidents and crashes listed below include only those of US Airways and US Air (not predecessor or merger airlines such as Allegheny, Piedmont, PSA or America West; or partnering regional commuter airlines operating US Airways flights under the brand US Airways Express).

US Airways reported incidents
Flight	Date	Aircraft	Location	Description	Injuries				Photo of aircraft involved
Flight	Date	Aircraft	Location	Description	Fatal	Serious	Minor	Uninjured	
499	February 21, 1986	Douglas DC-9-31	Erie, Pennsylvania	Overran icy runway; hull loss but no fatalities	0	0	1	22	
5050	September 20, 1989	Boeing 737-400	Flushing, New York	Deflection of rudder during takeoff	2	3	18	40	
1493	February 1, 1991	Boeing 737-300	Los Angeles, California	Runway collision with SkyWest Airlines Flight 5569; ATC controller separation error	35	12	17	37	
405	March 22, 1992	Fokker 28-4000	Flushing, New York	Improper deicing procedures, pilot error	27	9	12	3	
1016	July 2, 1994	McDonnell Douglas DC-9-32	Charlotte, North Carolina	Windshear during missed approach	37	16	4		
427	September 8, 1994	Boeing 737-300	Hopewell Township, Beaver County, Penn.	Uncommanded rudder deflection	132				
1549	January 15, 2009	Airbus A320-214	New York, New York	Bird strike in both engines, causing dual engine failure and ditching into the Hudson River	0	5	95	50	
1702	March 13, 2014	Airbus A320-214	Philadelphia, Pennsylvania	Rejected takeoff, tail and landing gear strike, pilot error.	0	0	0	154	
Total casualties					Fatal	Serious	Minor	Uninjured	
(8 incidents)					233	45	147	306	

== See also ==
- List of airlines of the United States
- List of defunct airlines of the United States
- List of airports in the United States
- Air transportation in the United States
- Transportation in the United States
- Footprint Center (formerly Talking Stick Resort Arena)
