= History of United Airlines =

United Airlines was formed in 1931 as a subsidiary of United Aircraft and Transport Corporation to manage a group of airlines controlled by William Boeing, including Boeing Air Transport, National Air Transport, Pacific Air Transport and Varney Air Lines, all of which held U.S. Air Mail contracts. Of its predecessor companies, the first to commence cargo (airmail) operations was Varney Air Lines on April 6, 1926, a date United later celebrated as its centenary. The 1934 Air Mail scandal led to the dissolution of the parent corporation, resulting in the separation of Boeing, United Aircraft (now RTX), and United Air Lines, all of which continued as independent major American companies.

As an independent company, United expanded rapidly. In 1933, it introduced the Boeing 247, the first modern airliner, enabling non-stop transcontinental travel. During World War II, United modified the aircraft for military use and transporting supplies. After the war, United capitalized on the aviation boom, and in 1961 merged with Capital Airlines, briefly becoming the world's second-largest airline. United was a major proponent of airline deregulation in the 1970s and would ultimately benefit from the post-deregulation decline of Pan American World Airways acquiring Pan Am's Pacific route authority in 1985, its London Heathrow operation in 1991, and its Latin America and Caribbean network in 1992. In 1997, United was one of the five airlines to launch Star Alliance, the first global airline alliance.

United suffered significant losses during the September 11 attacks, when two of its aircraft—a Boeing 757 and a Boeing 767—were hijacked and deliberately crashed. Already facing financial difficulties, the airline was further affected by the post-attack economic downturn and filed for bankruptcy in 2002. United emerged from bankruptcy in 2006 after restructuring and, in 2010, merged with Continental Airlines, creating one of the world's largest airlines.

== Beginnings ==
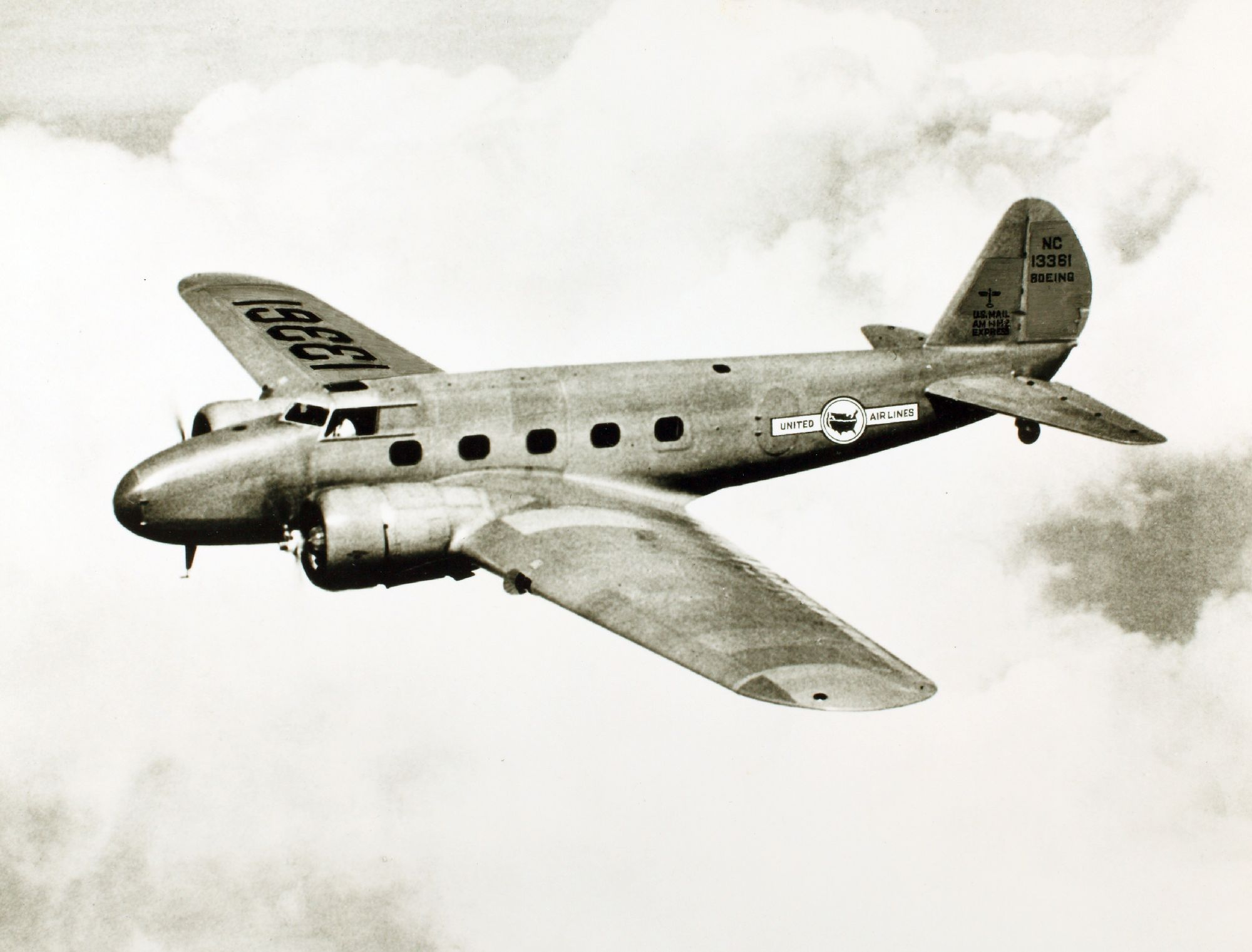
United Airlines Boeing 247, the first modern airliner

United Air Lines was the creation of aviation pioneer William Boeing, who started out in the airplane business in 1916. His Boeing Airplane Company, achieved the first international postal delivery in 1919, and he went on to establish Boeing Air Transport (BAT) in 1927. In 1928 his company acquired mail and passenger service operator, Pacific Air Transport, and was renamed the company Boeing Airplane & Transport Corporation. In early 1929 the name was changed again to United Aircraft & Transport Corporation (UATC) and merged with Pratt & Whitney Aircraft. UATC acquired America's first scheduled passenger services carrier Stout Air Services on April 29, 1929, the nation's first scheduled service (mail only) operator Varney Air Lines in early 1930, and finally National Air Transport (a large Chicago-based mail-only carrier) on May 7, 1930. On March 28, 1931, UATC formed the corporation United Air Lines, Inc. to manage its airline subsidiaries.

Varney Air Lines was founded in Boise, Idaho by Walter Varney who ended up playing an interesting role both aviation and United's history. Varney's chief pilot Leon D. "Lee" Cuddeback flew the first contract air mail flight in a Swallow biplane from Varney's Boise headquarters to the railroad mail hub at Pasco, Washington on April 6, 1926, and returned the following day with 200 pounds of mail. Varney Air Lines' original 1925 hangar served as a portion of the terminal building for the Boise Airport until 2003, when the structure was replaced. And Continental Airlines' is the successor to Speed Lines, which Varney also founded in 1932 and whose name changed to Varney Speed Lines in 1934.

With its string of successful acquisitions, United Air Lines was able to provide coast-to-coast passenger and mail services by 1930. It took 27 hours to fly the route, one way. Boeing Air Transport hired registered nurse Ellen Church to assist passengers; United claims Church as the first airline stewardess. In Chicago, United Air Lines hired the first airline dietitian, Ella Gertrude McMullen, in July 1937.

Following the Air Mail scandal of 1930, the Air Mail Act of 1934 banned the common ownership of manufacturers and airlines. UATC's President Philip G. Johnson was forced to resign and moved to Trans-Canada Airlines, the future Air Canada. UATC was broken into three separate companies. UATC's manufacturing interests east of the Mississippi River became United Aircraft (the future United Technologies), while its manufacturing interests west of the Mississippi became Boeing Airplane Company. The airline interests became United Air Lines. The airline company's new president, hired to make a fresh start as airmail contracts were re-awarded in 1934, was William A. Patterson, who remained as president until 1963.

=== Expansion into a national carrier ===
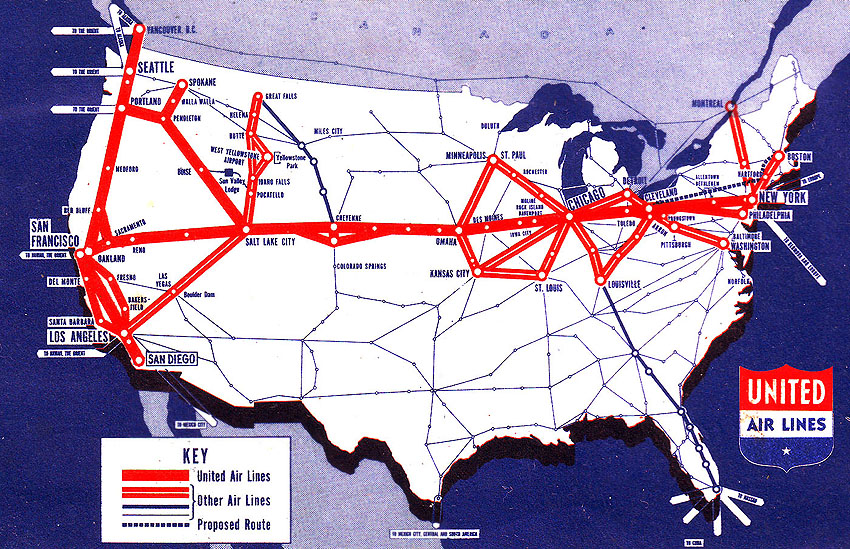
United Air Lines route map, 1940

United's early routes, formed by connecting airmail routes, was east-to-west from New York City via Chicago and Salt Lake City to San Francisco, and north–south along the West Coast. The early connections became the basis of United hubs in Chicago and San Francisco, and later in Denver and Washington, D.C.; these remain United's principal hubs.

In 1933, United introduced the Boeing 247; for the first time, passengers could fly across the United States without an overnight stop or changing planes. That summer, the fastest flight left Newark at noon (probably EST) and arrived at San Francisco at 6:55 PST after eight stops; the fare was $160 one-way, equal to $2,868 in today's value.

On the night of October 10, 1933, a United Boeing 247 exploded in mid-air and crashed near Chesterton, Indiana, killing seven people aboard. An investigation revealed that the explosion was caused by a nitroglycerin bomb placed in the baggage hold. The incident is believed to be the first proven case of air sabotage in commercial aviation history. No suspects or motives were ever found.

During World War II, United-trained ground crews modified airplanes for use as bombers, and transported mail, material and passengers in support of the war effort. The airline was busy covering the need for air transport across the United States during the war. Its fleet of fifty aircraft were utilized at a rate of more than thirteen hours per day by 1945 (well above the pre-war rate of less than nine hours per day), flying 100,000 miles per day. Post-war United benefited from new technologies (such as the pressurized cabin which permitted planes to fly above the weather) and a boom in customer demand for air travel. This was the period during which Pan American Airways revived its Pacific route system that would later be acquired by United.

In 1954, United became the first airline with flight simulators that had visual, sound and motion cues for training pilots. Purchased for US$3 million (1954) from Curtiss-Wright, these were the first modern simulators for training of commercial pilots.

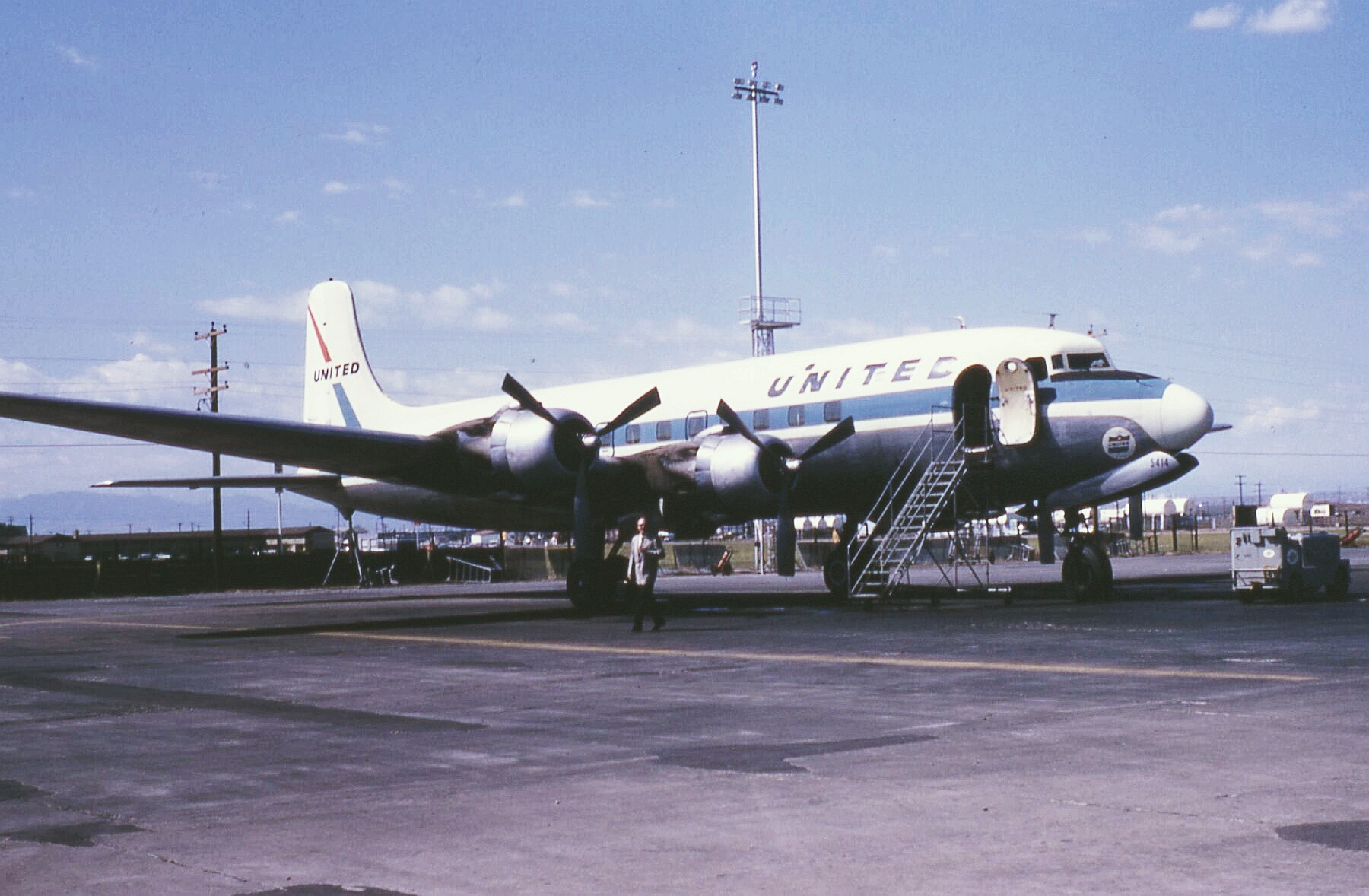
United DC-6 aircraft, similar to the plane bombed by Jack Graham in 1955

From 1953 to 1970, United operated six-day-a-week afternoon non-stop extra fare "men only" flights between New York and Chicago ("The Chicago Executive" 642–643) and Los Angeles and San Francisco (665–666) on which women and children were banned. Advertised as a "club in the sky", they featured "cocktails, steak dinner, and cigar and pipe smoking permitted".

On November 1, 1955, United Air Lines Flight 629 was bombed while flying from Stapleton Airport in Denver to Portland, killing all 39 passengers and five crew members on board the Douglas DC-6B. The bomb was planted by Jack Graham, who put the device in his mother's luggage to collect on her life insurance policy. Graham was arrested, tried, and later executed a year after the explosion.

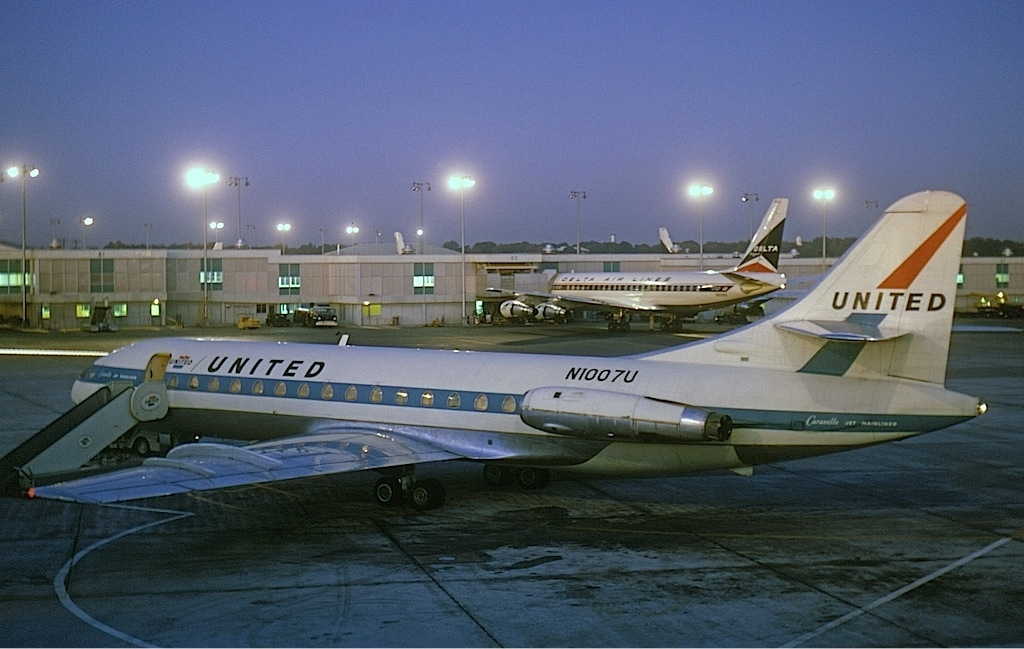
United Sud Aviation Caravelle in 1965 at Atlanta Airport

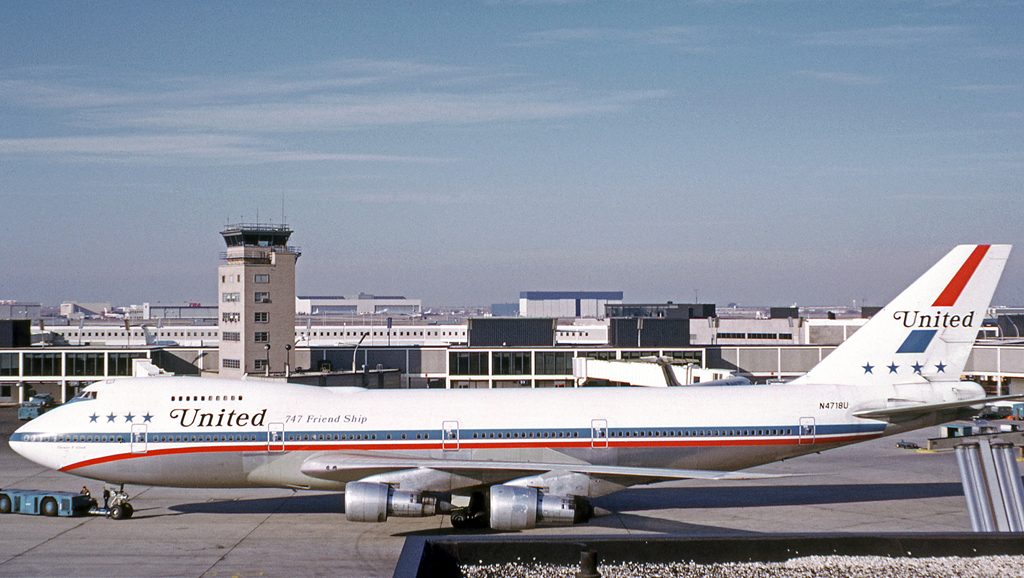
United Boeing 747 wearing the mid-1970s Friend Ship scheme at Chicago O'Hare Airport in December 1973

In the late 1950s, three United planes were lost in mid-air collisions that killed everyone on both aircraft involved. On June 30, 1956, Flight 718 collided with a Trans World Airlines Lockheed L-1049 Super Constellation over the Grand Canyon in what was then the world's deadliest commercial airline disaster. On April 21, 1958, Flight 736 crashed in southern Nevada after colliding with a USAF F-100 Super Sabre fighter jet. On December 16, 1960, Flight 826 hit another TWA Super Constellation over New York City. These accidents helped pave the way for modern Air Traffic Control. Also, in 1958, United received its first Douglas DC-8, its first jet aircraft.

On June 1, 1961, United merged with Capital Airlines, displacing rival American Airlines as the world's second largest airline behind Aeroflot of the Soviet Union. The merger resulted in United inheriting from Capital the British-manufactured Vickers Viscount, which was the only mainline turboprop aircraft ever flown by the airline. United also began operating French-manufactured Sud Aviation Caravelle jetliners and was the only American-based airline ever to operate the Caravelle in scheduled passenger service. In 1968, the company reorganized, creating UAL Corporation with United Airlines as a wholly owned subsidiary.

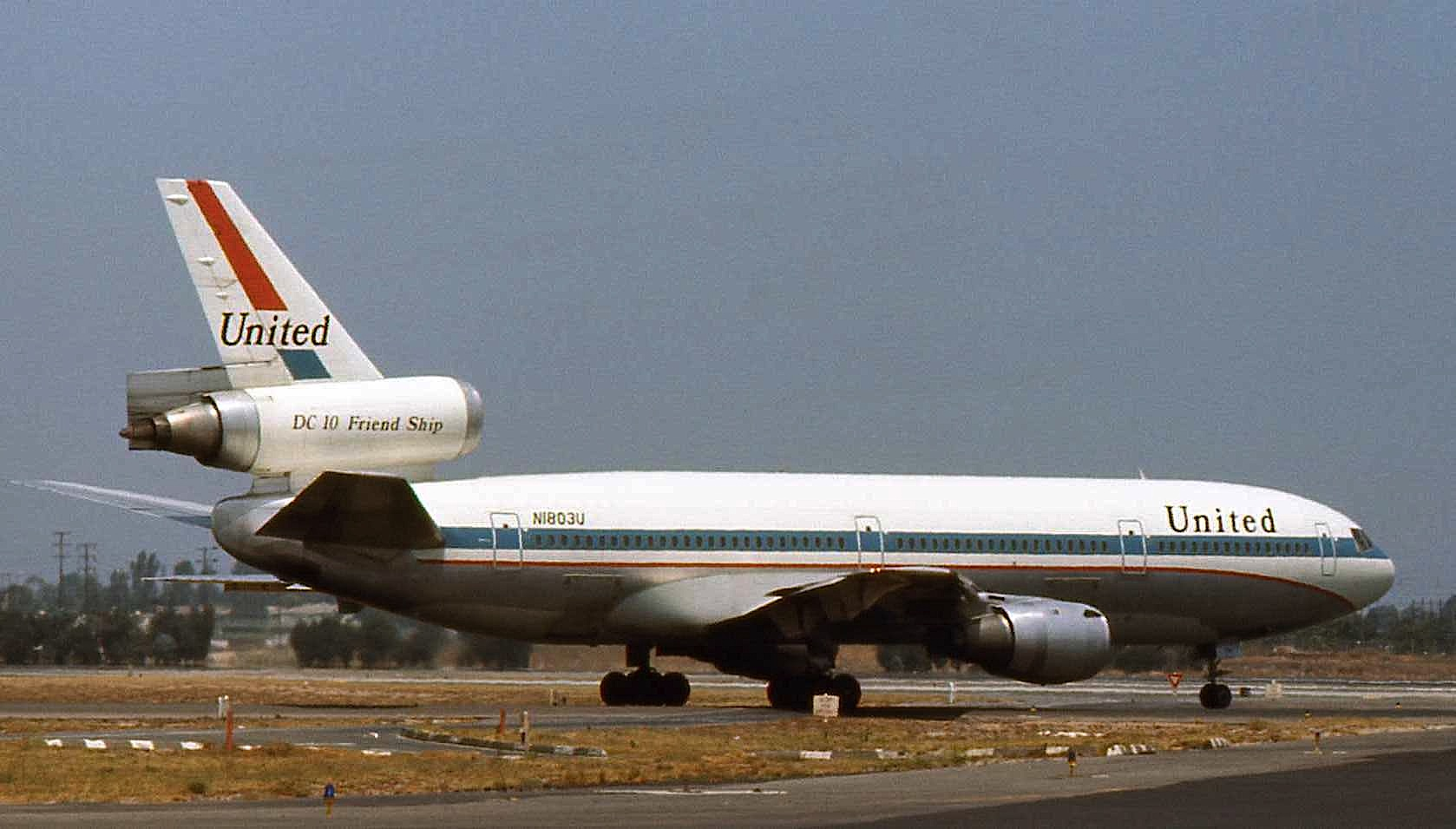
United DC-10 in August 1974

In August 1970, United took delivery of their first Boeing 747s, initially operating them on longer routes within the United States. A year later, United, along with American, were the launch customers for the McDonnell Douglas DC-10, which served as a workhorse in both airlines' fleets and others around the world for many years.

United Airlines is the only airline to have operated Executive One, the designation given to a civil flight carrying the U.S. president. On December 26, 1973, then-president Richard Nixon flew aboard a United DC-10 flight from Washington Dulles to Los Angeles. White House staff explained that this was done to conserve fuel by not having to fly the usual Boeing 707 aircraft used for Air Force One. In keeping with the practice of having two aircraft available at all times during Presidential travel, an Air Force aircraft followed in case of emergency.

Revenue Passenger-Miles (Millions)(Sched Service Only)
	United	Capital
1951	1,835	604
1955	3,968	792
1960	5,759	1,492
1965	12,249	(merged 1961)
1970	23,768	
1975	26,226	
1981	34,787	
1985	41,693	
1989	69,589	
1995	102,680	
2000	116,533	
2005	113,894	

In August 1940, United scheduled flights to 37 airports. In August 1953, 66 airports on United and 51 on Capital; United flew to 91 in May 1968, and to 90 in November 1978.

== Deregulation Era ==
United sought overseas routes in the 1960s, but the 1969 Transpacific Route Case denied it this expansion; it did not gain an overseas route until 1983, when United began flights to Tokyo from Portland and Seattle. United became a proponent of deregulation due to its perception that regulation, as it then existed, was a major constraint on United's ability to profitably grow. After years of focused work to bring about deregulation, the 1978 Airline Deregulation Act became law.

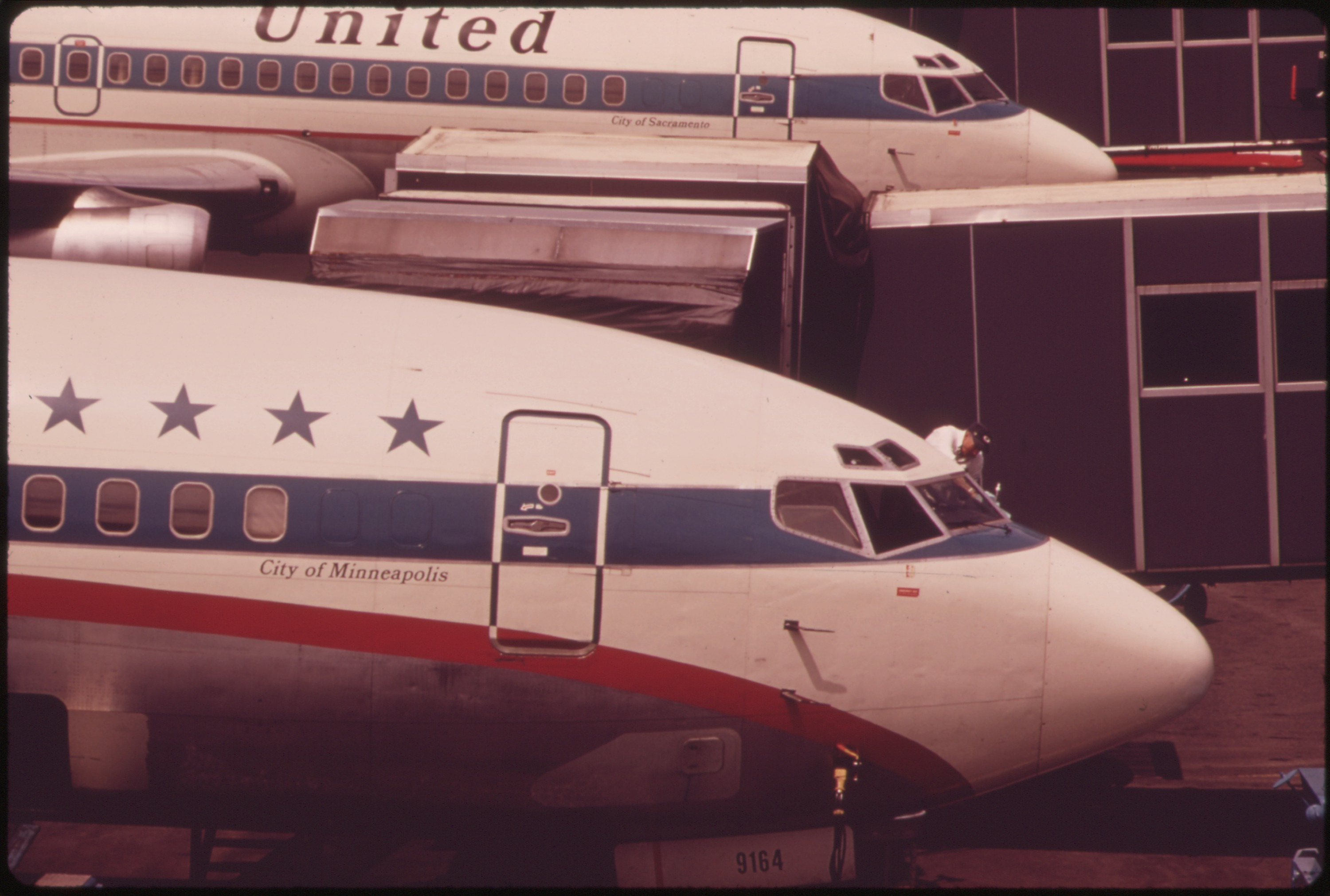
Two planes at Portland International Airport in May 1973.

During the 1970s, economic turmoil and the "stagflation" that ensued, as well as labor unrest and the pressures of the 1978 Airline Deregulation Act, greatly hampered the industry and United, which incurred losses at a time when it was also undergoing changes at the top of both United and its parent company UAL Corp. Some changes were due largely to the retirement of long-term senior management members, as well as performance-driven changes at the very top in 1969 and again in 1985 following the pilot strike (discussed below).

In May 1981, a week after rival American Airlines launched AAdvantage, the first modern frequent flyer program, United launched its Mileage Plus.

In 1982, United was the launch carrier for the Boeing 767-200, receiving its first 767-200s on August 19. The launch order for 30 airplanes in 1978, together with an order for 30 Boeing 727-200s, totaled $1.2 billion, and was the largest commercial airplane order up to that time, eclipsing Pan Am's launch order for the 747.

In 1984, United was the first airline to serve all 50 states with commercial airports when it started flights to Atlanta, Nashville, Memphis, Little Rock, Fargo, Casper, Jackson, and Charleston.

In 1985, United agreed to buy the ailing Pan American World Airways' entire Pacific Division, Boeing 747SPs, and L-1011-500s, and flight crew staffs for $750 million. By late 1986, United flew to thirteen Pacific destinations, most of which were purchased from Pan Am.

=== Strike of 1985 ===
On May 17, 1985, United's pilots went on a 29-day strike, claiming that CEO Richard Ferris was trying to "break the unions." The pilots used management's proposed "B-scale" pilot pay rates as proof. American Airlines already had a non-merging B-scale for its pilots. Ferris insisted United had to have pilot costs no higher than American's, so he offered United pilots a "word-for-word" contract to match American's, or the same bottom-line numbers. The United ALPA-MEC rejected that offer. The only choice left, to achieve parity with American's pilot costs, was to begin a B-scale for United's new-hire pilots.

Ferris wanted that B-scale to merge in the captain's ranks, which was more generous than American's B-scale, which never merged at all. However, the ALPA MEC insisted they merge in the new pilot's sixth-year with the airline. In the final hours before the strike, nearly all issues had been resolved, except for the time length of the B-scale. It appeared that would be resolved too as negotiations continued. ALPA negotiators delivered a new counter-proposal at 12:20 am in an effort to avoid the strike. However, MEC Chairman Roger Hall, who was hosting a national teleconference from the Odeum (a convention center in the Chicago suburbs) with F. Lee Bailey, declared the strike was on at 12:01 am on May 17, without further consulting the negotiators, some of whom believed they could find agreement on all contract terms if the negotiations were allowed to continue. Moments before the ALPA announced strike deadline, they began a "countdown of the final 30 seconds from Chicago" (the Odeum teleconference). Doing that made it impossible to extend the strike deadline so that the final issues could be resolved without a strike.

In February 1987, Ferris changed United's parent company's name from UAL Corporation to Allegis, but the name change was short-lived. Following Ferris' termination by the board, Allegis divested its non-airline properties in 1987 and reverted to the UAL Corp. name in May 1988.

=== Record-setting flight ===
In 1988, United flew a two-stop around-the-world flight to raise money for the Friendship Foundation using a Boeing 747SP-21 purchased from Pan American World Airways. The flight made a short-lived record for the fastest flight around the globe; within a month, a Gulfstream IV business jet had broken Friendship One's record.

=== Employee Stock Ownership Plan ===
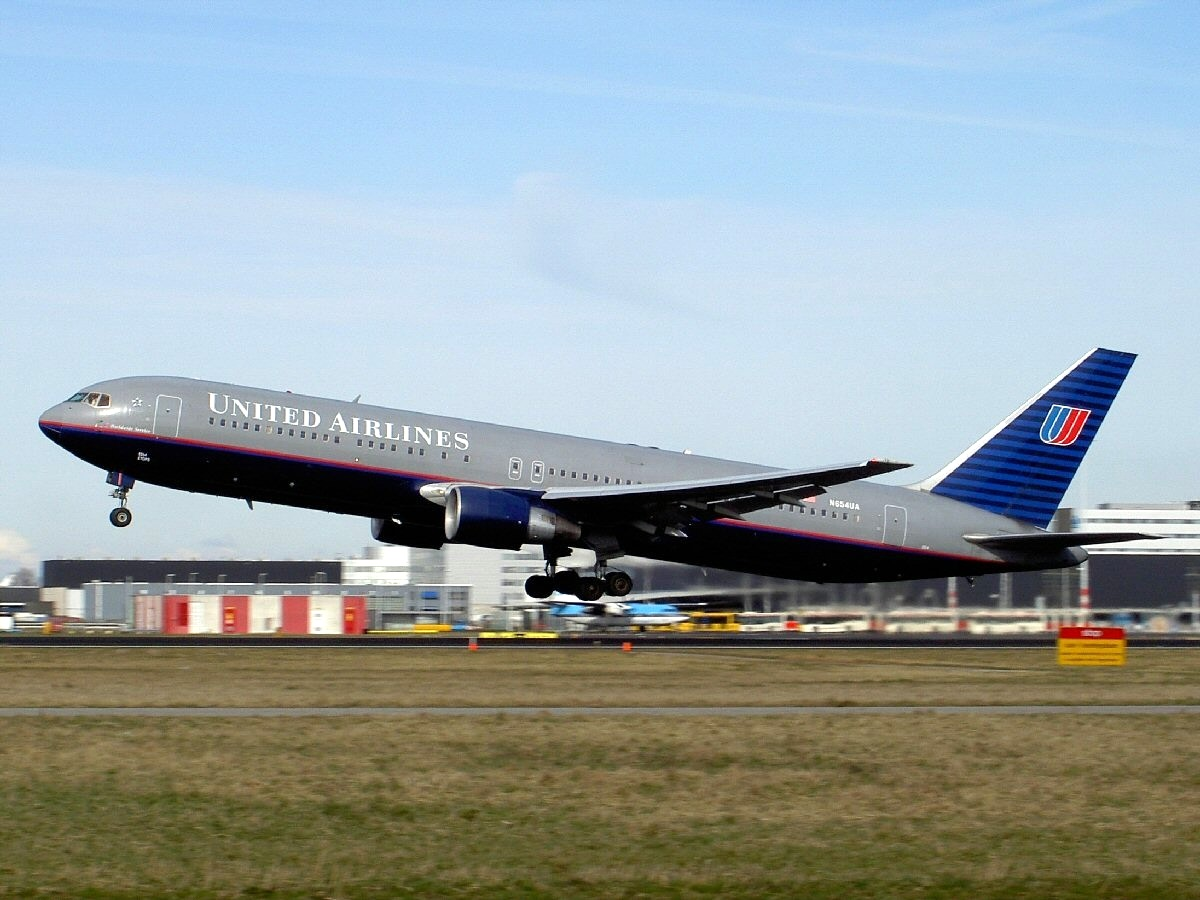
United Airlines Boeing 767-300 with the Saul Bass logo at Amsterdam Airport Schiphol in February 2005, in the "Battleship Grey" livery, used from 1993 to 2004 and common until the merger with Continental Airlines in 2010.

The decline of Pan American World Airways offered opportunities; in 1991, United purchased Pan Am's routes to London Heathrow Airport. In direct negotiations with the British government, United also obtained rights to fly to Heathrow from Chicago. However, the aftermath of the Gulf War and competition from low-cost carriers led to losses of US$332 million in 1991 and US$957 million in 1992. In 1992, United purchased Pan Am's Latin American and Caribbean routes and Miami gates, but allowed months to elapse between Pan Am's demise and its launch of service.

In 1994, United's pilots, machinists, bag handlers, and non-contract employees agreed to acquire 55% of company stock in exchange for 15% to 25% salary concessions. The flight attendants voted not to participate in the deal, and some initially wore buttons saying "we just work here." The Employee Stock Ownership Plan (ESOP) made United the largest employee-owned corporation in the world. United used the opportunity to create the low-cost subsidiary Shuttle by United in an attempt to compete with low-cost carriers.

United used its employee-ownership in its marketing communications, with slogans such as "the employee-owners of United invite you to come fly the friendly skies," "we don't just work here," and "thank you for calling United Airlines; please hold and one of our owner-representatives will be with you shortly."

The financial outcomes of the ESOP were decidedly uneven for different players. As part of ESOP agreement, United CEO Stephen Wolf resigned and took a consulting job with Lazard Freres, the investment company he had hired to advise United's board during the ESOP buyout process. Stewart Oran, the key legal advisor to the pilots' union, received a $5.5 million package to join the management of the new employee-owned company as legal counsel after the ESOP was formed. Having a larger say in running the company, United's unions later successfully bargained for significant pay increases, but the effect was only short-term. The rank and file employees were locked into their stock, which was wiped out in the eventual bankruptcy.

During this period, United introduced its grey and blue color scheme; however, it was criticized for blending with the darkness during nighttime operations.

=== Turn-of-the-21st-century developments ===
In 1989, United ordered the then-new Boeing 747-400. In 1993, United phased out the Saul Bass livery and introduced the "Battleship Gray" livery to their fleet. In 1995, United became both the launch customer of the Boeing 777, having significant input on its design. In 1997, United co-founded the Star Alliance with Air Canada, Lufthansa, Scandinavian Airlines, and Thai Airways. That same year, United opened its southwest US hub at Los Angeles International Airport.

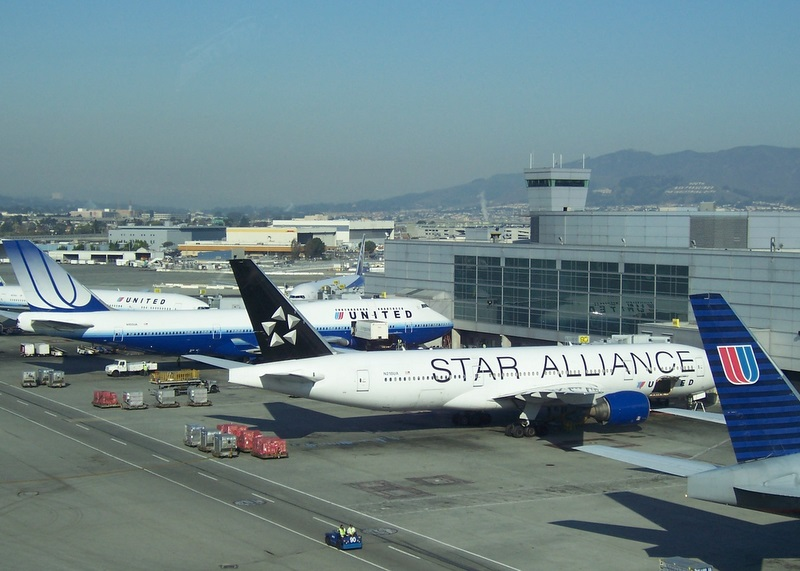
Three United Boeing 777-200ERs and one Boeing 747-400 in February 2005 parked at San Francisco International Airport, one of its main hubs. United is also one of the founding members of Star Alliance.

In 1994, United founded Kion de Mexico, an aircraft ground services and airline related outsourcing company located at Mexico City International Airport. Kion mainly served United, but also served other airlines including Air Canada, Lufthansa, and US Airways (Star Alliance members). Services that Kion de Mexico offered included ramp service, customer service, and cargo management. In January 2009, the company ceased operations and sold its service contracts and equipment to Menzies Aviation.

In 1997, Sony engineer John Cooperstock and an assistant professor at McGill University in Montreal, Quebec, created untied.com, a website chronicling complaints about service on United, including those from Premier Class customers. In September 2000, Kevin Simpson of the Denver Post said that "the Untied.com phenomenon mirrors the online trend in consumer activism that has caught on with the disgruntled flying public this summer travel season."

In 1998, Delta Air Lines and United introduced a marketing partnership that included a reciprocal redemption agreement between SkyMiles and Mileage Plus programs and shared lounges. This allowed members of either frequent flier program to earn miles on both carriers and utilize both carriers' lounges. Delta and United attempted to form a cozier codeshare relationship, but this deal was effectively killed by ALPA. The marketing partnership ended in divorce in 2003, but paved the way for a future alliance with US Airways.

In May 2000, United announced plans to acquire competitor US Airways in a complex deal valued at $11.6 billion. The offer drew immediate scorn from consumer groups and employees of both airlines. By 2001, the regulatory sentiment was against the deal, and United withdrew the offer just before the Department of Justice barred the merger on antitrust grounds in July. The two airlines subsequently formed an amicable partnership that led to US Airways' entrance into the Star Alliance. May 2000 also saw a bitter contract dispute between United and its pilots' union. The pilots wanted their pay restored to the levels that existed prior to the pay cuts and concessions that were taken to fund the ESOP. Planning for the busy summer season, United had counted on its pilots flying overtime. However, the pilots could not be forced to work overtime, and most pilots refused to fly the extra hours. Although United knew they would have to cancel numerous flights if this were to happen, they did not hire new pilots to make up for the potential shortage. Over the summer, United had to cancel a large portion of its schedule at its major hubs. Eventually, CEO Jim Goodwin and the rest of the management had to get the pilots back in the cockpits and quickly offered them a 48% increase over four years with up to 28% upfront.

=== September 11 attacks ===
During the attacks of September 11, 2001, two of the four planes hijacked were owned by United Airlines. One aircraft was N612UA, a Boeing 767-222 operating as United Airlines Flight 175, flown into the South Tower of the World Trade Center. The other was N591UA, a Boeing 757-222 operating as United Airlines Flight 93, which crashed in rural Pennsylvania after the passengers fought back against the hijackers, and was suspected to have been directed towards the United States Capitol building, according to the 9/11 Commission.

=== Bankruptcy and reorganization ===
With a strong presence on the West Coast, United benefited from the dot-com boom, which boosted traffic (especially premium traffic) to the San Francisco hub. This increase was only temporary, and when the bubble finally burst, United was in a worse position than before because it had failed to keep costs under control, possibly due to giving its pilots pay raises of up to 28% in the summer of 2000. Coupled with a battered network, the post-9/11 decline in air travel and skyrocketing oil prices, the company lost $2.14 billion in 2001 on revenues of $16.14 billion. That same year, United applied for a $1.5 billion loan guarantee from the federal Air Transportation Stabilization Board established in the wake of the 9/11 attacks. When the IAM union failed to approve the loan guarantee—while all other unions approved it—the application was rejected in late 2002, and the company was forced to seek debtor-in-possession financing from commercial sources to cover the expected future losses. United made several attempts to obtain government loans, even enlisting several congressmen and senators for help. The government rejected the application, claiming United "could probably obtain the $2 billion in financing it needs to emerge from protection without a federal loan guarantee".

Unable to secure additional capital, UAL Corporation filed for chapter 11 bankruptcy protection in December 2002. The ESOP was terminated, although its shares had become virtually worthless by then. Blame for the bankruptcy fell on 9/11, which triggered financial difficulty for all the major North American airlines, coupled with a national economic slowdown that was then underway.

United continued operations during its bankruptcy, but was forced to cut its costs drastically. Tens of thousands of workers were furloughed and all city ticket offices were closed in the United States. The airline canceled several existing and planned routes, and eliminated its entire Latin American gateway and flight crew base at Miami International Airport after March 1, 2004. Furthermore, they reduced their mainline fleet from 557 (before 9/11) to 460 aircraft.

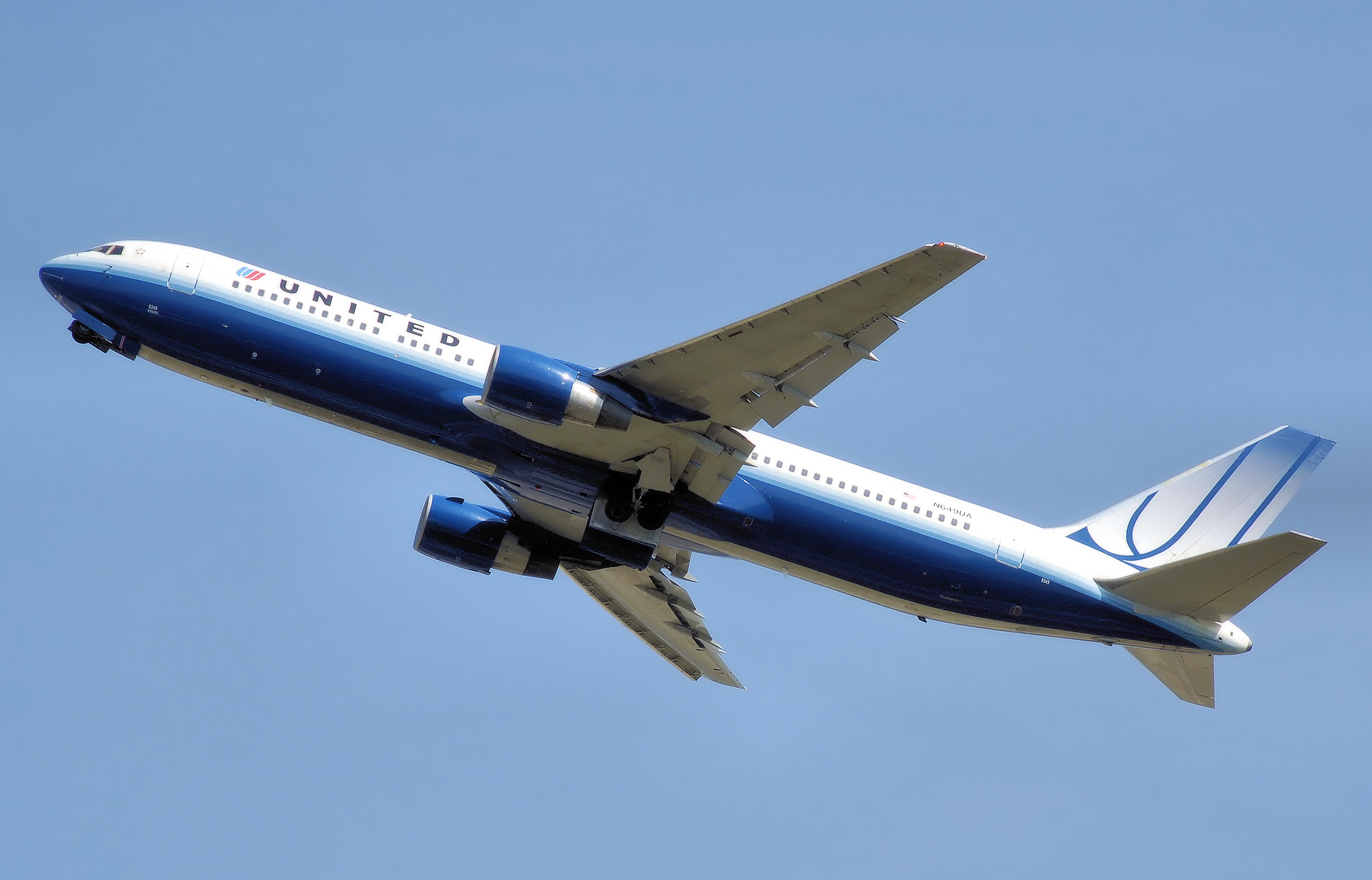
A United Airlines Boeing 767-300 taking off from London Heathrow Airport in August 2007.

At the same time, the airline continued to invest in new projects. On November 12, 2003, it launched Ted, a new low-cost carrier to compete with other low-cost airlines. In 2004, it launched its luxury p.s. service on re-configured Boeing 757-200s from JFK Airport in New York City to Los Angeles and San Francisco. That same year, the airline introduced its "Blue Tulip" livery to its fleet to signify the company's fresh start and emergence from bankruptcy; despite the livery being new, it was never applied to any newly manufactured aircraft, as United did not order or take delivery for any new aircraft during its use. The service was targeted to business customers and high-end leisure customers in the coast-to-coast market. In February 2004, the airline introduced the new blue and white livery, commonly called "Rising Blue", with the Blue Tulip on the tail to coincide with a new advertising campaign.

Financial pressure on the airline was heavy. The 2003 SARS epidemic depressed traffic on United's extensive Pacific network. The spikes in the price of jet fuel ate away the remaining profits United made. United implemented several fare hikes on overseas routes, citing rising fuel costs, in 2004 and 2005. Two days after its triumphant first flight to Vietnam, United announced that it would cut U.S. flight capacity by 14% after the holidays and add more international flights, which were more profitable.

United took advantage of its Chapter 11 status to negotiate hard-to-cut costs with employees, suppliers and contractors, including cancellation of feeder contracts with United Express carriers Atlantic Coast Airlines (which became Independence Air) and Air Wisconsin (which became a US Airways Express carrier). However, the most controversial of all was the 2005 cancellation of its pension plan, the largest such default in American corporate history. It renegotiated its contracts with the pilots' and mechanics' unions and the Association of Flight Attendants for lower pay. Criticism was also leveled at CEO Glenn Tilton for demanding pay cuts from employees while receiving the highest salary of any major U.S. airline CEO.

Originally slated to exit bankruptcy protection after 2½ years in the third quarter of 2005, United requested yet another extension in light of record-high fuel prices. On August 26, 2005, the bankruptcy court extended the airline's exclusive right to file a reorganization plan to November 1, although it also stated firmly this extension would be the last. United announced at the same time that it had raised $3 billion in exit financing and filed its Plan of Reorganization, as announced, on September 7, 2005. On January 20, 2006, the bankruptcy court approved the restructuring plan, clearing the way for United to exit bankruptcy on February 1 and finally return to normal operations.

=== Beyond Chapter 11 ===
On December 9, 2004, the airline made history when UA869, operated by a Boeing 747-400, landed at Ho Chi Minh City (formerly Saigon) in Vietnam. The scheduled flight from San Francisco via Hong Kong (SFO–HKG–SGN) was the first by a U.S. airline since the end of the Vietnam War, when Pan Am halted service shortly before the fall of Saigon in 1975.

On February 1, 2006, United emerged from Chapter 11 bankruptcy protection under which it had operated since December 9, 2002, the largest and longest airline bankruptcy case in the history of the industry. In 2006, United's management called for consolidation in the industry and looked for a suitor. Later that year, The Wall Street Journal revealed that Continental Airlines was in discussions of a merger with United. A deal was not "certain or imminent," with the talks being in a preliminary state. In the interim, it increased its ties with British carrier BMI and Aloha Airlines. In April 2007, United and BMI announced that they would "effectively merge" their trans-Atlantic operations. The merged operations would have begun in March 2008, but Lufthansa's takeover of BMI preempted the two carrier's plans when BMI's transatlantic flights were terminated. United's acquisition of an equity stake in its longtime partner Aloha Airlines in May 2007 was short-lived, as Aloha ceased operations in March 2008. On June 14, 2007, CFO Jake Brace said the company was still looking to "tie the knot" with a suitable merger partner.

In the years following United's exit from bankruptcy, the financial firms Bank of America and Fidelity Investments accumulated shares to become the second largest owner with an 11 percent stake in the company. The industry environment was ripe with pressures to merge and consolidate. Pardus Capital Management LP, a hedge fund that owned 7 million shares of Delta and 5.6 million shares of United, called for the two carriers to merge. This action sent shares of both airlines up, but became moot because Delta wedded Northwest.

The surge in jet fuel prices caused disruption to United's impending start of non-stop long-haul services. Though the FAA had already awarded the SFO to Guangzhou to United, they postponed the launch, citing high fuel prices. Other long-haul city pairs, such as its 2009 application to fly between Los Angeles and Shanghai (which began May 2011), were denied by the FAA.

During this time of turmoil brought on by external forces, United explored options to re-establish its financial footing and raise capital. These changes included:

- Divesting of the Maintenance, Repair, and Overhaul operations at SFO.
- Spinning off the cargo division.
- Spinning off the Mileage Plus frequent flier program.

These spin-offs and divestitures have not come to fruition.

In May 2008, the American Customer Satisfaction Index scored United Airlines second-last among American-based airlines in customer satisfaction with a 21% decrease since the study began in 1994 and an 11% decrease over the previous year. On April 27, 2008, it was reported that UAL Corporation and US Airways Group were in the advanced stages of merger negotiations as well. Sources stated that a merger was expected to be announced within two weeks of the report. United pilots vociferously rejected the proposal and vowed to fight it. Star Alliance co-founder and Lufthansa CEO Wolfgang Mayrhuber threw his support behind a marriage of partner carriers United and US Airways.

On June 4, 2008, United announced that it would close its Ted unit and reconfigure it for a return to mainline configuration to compensate for the removal of its Boeing 737s that were to be retired. That retirement plan included Boeing 737s and Boeing 747s, reducing the mainline fleet from 460 to 359 and furthering the airline's goal of cutting domestic capacity by 15 percent. On June 12, 2008, United announced it would charge $15 for the first checked bag, becoming the second U.S. airline to do so, after American Airlines. On June 28, 2008, United announced the cessation of several international routes, including San Francisco to Nagoya and Chicago to Mexico City.

On September 8, 2008, the price of UAL shares fell by nearly 99% in fifteen minutes to $0.01 US amid rumors of another bankruptcy, before NASDAQ temporarily halted trading. The rumors were traced to an old story on the South Florida Sun-Sentinel website about the 2002 bankruptcy being picked up by Google News and subsequently presented by Bloomberg LP as a breaking story. The share price subsequently recovered most of its value.

In January 2009, United announced a code-sharing agreement with Aer Lingus for flights between Washington Dulles and Madrid. Aer Lingus would operate the service, which is permitted under recent open skies agreements between the United States and Europe. In May 2009, the U.S. Department of Transportation rated UAL eleventh among 19 US carriers in lost, damaged, delayed, or pilfered baggage, with 3.67 complaints per 1,000 passengers. In July 2009, the viral music video "United Breaks Guitars" was released about a disputed damaged baggage claim with the airline. United said it wanted to use the video as a staff training tool to help the company improve its internal "corporate culture" relating to its customer relations in that area of its services.

=== 2008 recession, fuel efficiency issues and new jet orders ===
In April 2009, United eliminated the ability to call customer service, leaving reservations agents as the only reachable contact for the airline.

In June 2009, United asked manufacturers Boeing and Airbus to submit proposals to sell the airline up to 150 jets in a winner-take-all competition. United took advantage of declining sales at both plane makers to reap steep price reductions; the large size of this prospective order would also influence pricing. The Wall Street Journal cited the average ages of four types of jets in United's fleet as follows:

- Boeing 747-400 – 13 years
- Boeing 777-200ER – 10 years
- Boeing 767-300ER – 14 years
- Boeing 757-200 – 17 years

=== Merger with Continental (2010) ===
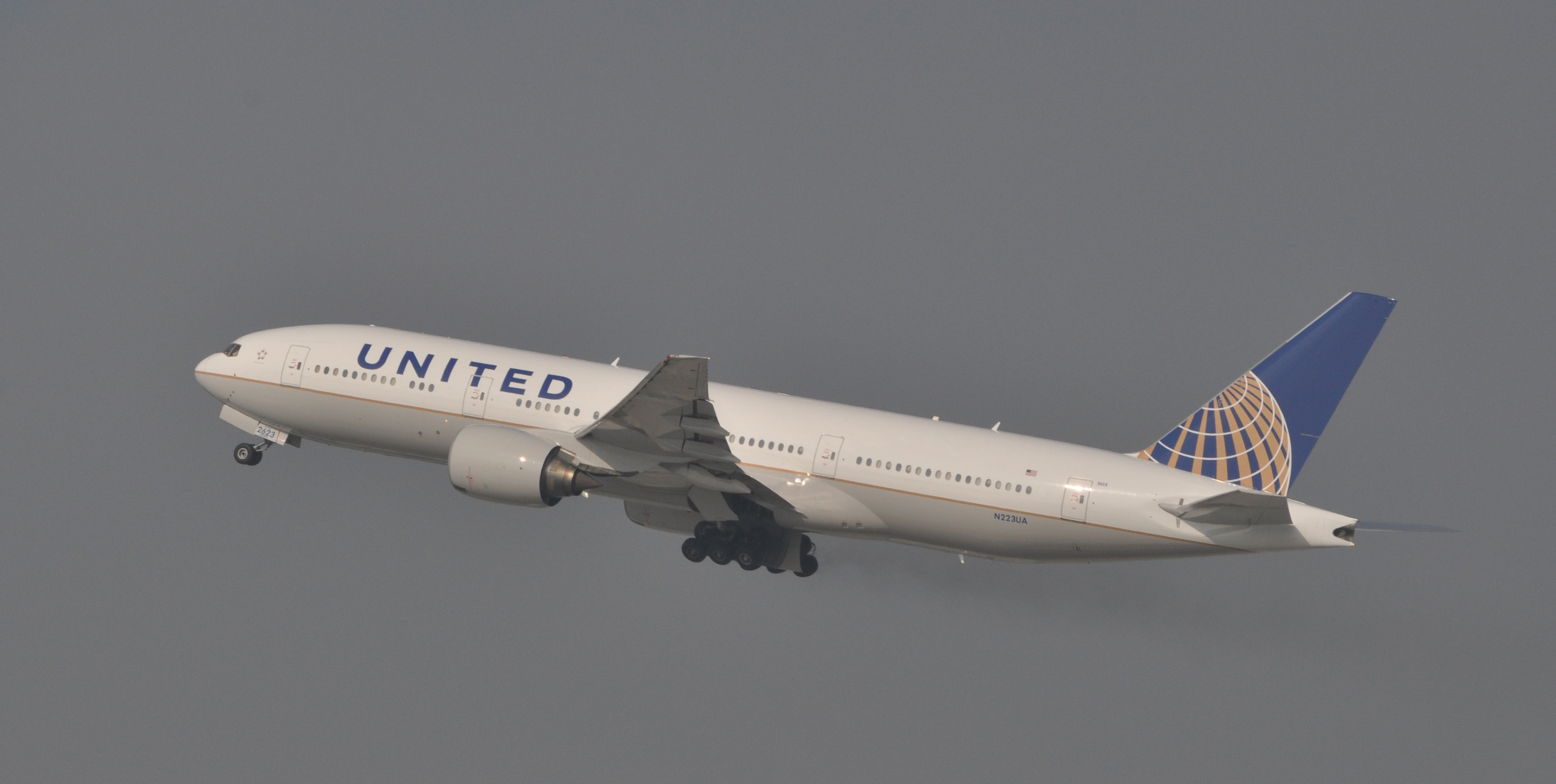
United Boeing 777-200 taking off from Los Angeles in December 2010. The branding combines the United name with the "globe" livery that was introduced by Continental in 1991.

On April 16, 2010, United resumed merger talks with Continental Airlines. The board of directors of both Continental and UAL Corporation reached an agreement to combine operations to create the world's largest airline on May 2, 2010. The combined carrier would take the United Airlines name but use Continental's logo and livery. The carrier would be headquartered in Chicago, with Continental CEO Jeff Smisek acting as CEO of the combined airline. The merger was contingent upon shareholder and regulatory approval, but was approved by the European Union.

On August 11, 2010, United and Continental revealed a new logo based on that of Continental, to be used for the post-merger United. On August 27, 2010, the US Justice Department approved the Continental-United merger, partially due to the fact that the two airlines agreed to lease 18 take-off and 18 landing slots at Newark Liberty International Airport to Southwest Airlines. On September 17, 2010, United shareholders approved the merger deal with Continental. On October 1, 2010, UAL Corporation completed its acquisition of Continental Airlines, and changed its name to United Continental Holdings, Inc. UAL acquired Continental and Continental shareholders received 1.05 of UAL shares for each Continental share they owned.

Both carriers planned to begin merging operations in 2011 to form the world's biggest carrier, and expected to receive a single operating certificate by late 2011. The merged airline would use Continental's single operating certificate (SOC) (using the "United" name), while those of United and Air Micronesia would be surrendered. On the other hand, the merged airline would use United's maintenance certificate and allow Continental's maintenance certificate to lapse.

The two airlines remained separate until the operational integration was completed in early-2012. United and Continental announced that United Mileage Plus would be the remaining frequent flyer program of the two airlines. The airline received a single operating certificate from the FAA on November 30, 2011.

=== 2017 passenger removal controversy ===
On April 9, 2017, Dr. David Dao was bloodied and forcibly removed from United Express Flight 3411, sustaining injuries in the process. After the plane had been fully boarded, four members of staff presented themselves for the flight. The company offered compensation to seated passengers to give up their seats but had no volunteers, and four selected passengers were then told to leave the plane. Dao refused this instruction and law enforcement officers were called. The incident was recorded on video by several passengers and officials, and the resultant publicity and subsequent handling of the incident by United Airlines was a PR disaster.

=== 2018 planned growth through 2020 ===
In January 2018, United stated that it planned to grow its company by adding between 4% and 6% to its passenger capacity and maintain that growth through 2020; this news caused all U.S. airline stocks to fall in value. Also, United applied for more routes to Tokyo Haneda Airport, from its 6 U.S. hubs that did not fly there. Most of these hubs would have their existing flights to Narita shifted to Haneda.

=== 2020–2021: COVID-19 pandemic ===
As a result of the COVID-19 pandemic, in July 2020, United announced that it will be sending lay-off notice warnings to 36,000 employees including, 15,100 flight attendants, 11,000 in airport operations and 2,250 pilots among others. On September 2, 2020, United Airlines, in a new memo to its employees, indicated that they planned to cut 16,370 jobs in nearly a month. The planned involuntary cuts included 6,920 flight attendants, 2,850 pilots, 1,400 management jobs, 2,010 mechanics and 2,260 in airport operations, among others. In November 2020, United Airlines Holdings Inc. started manning flights to position shipments of Pfizer's COVID-19 vaccine in the event that the shots are approved by the U.S. Food and Drug Administration and other regulators worldwide. The Federal Aviation Administration has stated it will allow United shipments of 15,000 pounds of dry ice per flight, a measure taken to ensure the vaccine does not spoil, which is five times more than normally permitted.

In contrast to other US airlines, United did not retire any aircraft during the pandemic. In June 2021, United announced an order for 270 narrowbody planes, the largest in its history, in an effort to both revitalize its aging fleet and grow its capacity. The order was split between Boeing and Airbus: 150 737 MAX 10s, 50 MAX 8s, and 70 A321neos. It also plans to upgrade its entire existing mainline narrowbody fleet with new interiors, faster WiFi, and seatback entertainment by 2025. In December 2022, United placed another order for 100 787s, for the purpose of replacing the 767s and older 777-200s. Kirby stated that he anticipates and aims for United becoming the flag carrier of the United States.

As of mid-August 2021, United was the only major United States airline to require COVID-19 vaccines for their workers by October 25, 2021.

=== 2022–present: Post COVID ===
In early 2024, the Federal Aviation Administration announced in March 2024 that it would increase safety oversight of United following a string of safety-related incidents. In October 2024, the FAA ended its enhanced oversight after concluding its review.

In January 2025, United announced the introduction of flights to Ulaanbaatar from Tokyo Narita, with three weekly flights commencing 1 May 2025 serviced by its Boeing 737-800 aircraft.

In March 2026, the company took a strong stance against passengers listening to audio without headphones, suggesting they could be removed from the aircraft.

In October 2026, CEO Scott Kirby stated that United planned to continue expanding its network, highlightin the completion of a new terminal project at George Bush Intercontinental Airport that could increase the airport capacity by 40%.

== Predecessors ==
United Airlines is a combination of a number of air carriers that have merged with each other starting in the 1930s, with the most recent being in 2010 with Continental Airlines (which had previously merged with or acquired several airlines during its history) thus reflecting changes in focus of both United and the U.S. air transport market.

United Airlines was originally formed in 1931 to manage the airlines controlled by the United Aircraft and Transport Corporation:

- Boeing Air Transport (formed 1927)
- Pacific Air Transport (formed 1926, acquired 1928)
- Varney Air Lines (formed 1926, acquired 1930)
- National Air Transport (formed 1925, acquired 1930)
  - Stout Air Services (formed 1925, acquired 1929, merged into National in 1930)

All four airlines operated under their own names until 1934 when they merged to form one airline operating under the United name. Other predecessor air carriers that form the present United Airlines include:

- Capital Airlines (formed 1936, merged into United in 1961)
- Pan American World Airways (formed in 1927, Pacific division merged into United in 1985, London Heathrow operations merged into United in 1990, Latin America division merged into United in 1991, following Pan Am's bankruptcy)
- Continental Airlines (formed in 1934, merged into United in 2010)
  - Pioneer Air Lines (formed in 1939, merged into Continental Airlines in 1955)
  - Air Micronesia (formed in 1968 as a division of Continental, later renamed Continental Micronesia, merged into Continental in 2010)
  - Texas International Airlines (formed 1944, acquired Continental in 1982 and took the Continental name)
  - New York Air (formed 1980, merged into Continental in 1987)
  - People Express Airlines (formed 1981, merged into Continental in 1987)
    - Frontier Airlines (formed 1950, merged into People Express in 1986)
      - Arizona Airways (formed 1942, merged into Frontier in 1950)
      - Challenger Airlines (formed 1941, merged into Frontier in 1950)
      - Monarch Airlines (formed 1946, merged into Frontier in 1950)
      - Central Airlines (formed 1949, merged into Frontier in 1967)

Many of these acquisitions and mergers were completed by Continental Airlines when this carrier was under the ownership and control of Texas Air Corporation from 1982 to 1987. During that time period, New York Air and Texas International Airlines (which were already owned by Texas Air Corporation before this company acquired Continental) were merged into Continental. Texas Air Corporation subsequently acquired People Express Airlines (which had previously acquired Frontier Airlines) and then folded these air carriers into Continental as well. As for United, before merging with Continental in 2010, it had acquired Capital Airlines in 1961 and had also purchased Pan Am's Pacific Division as well as Pan Am's transatlantic route rights into Heathrow Airport in 1990.

== Brand history ==
=== Historical logos ===
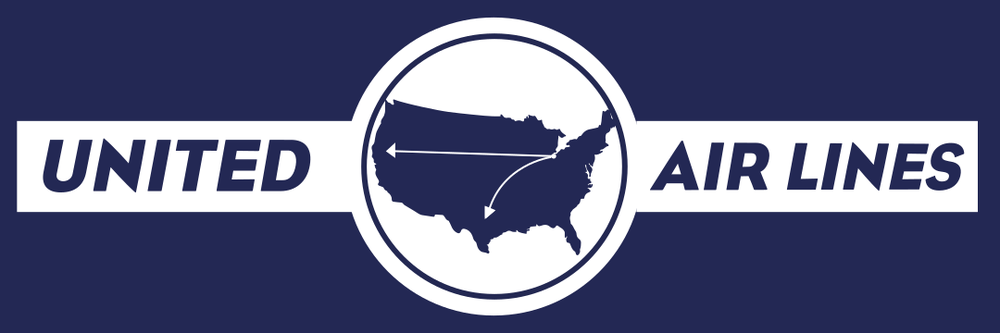
1930–1933

1933–1935

1935–1937

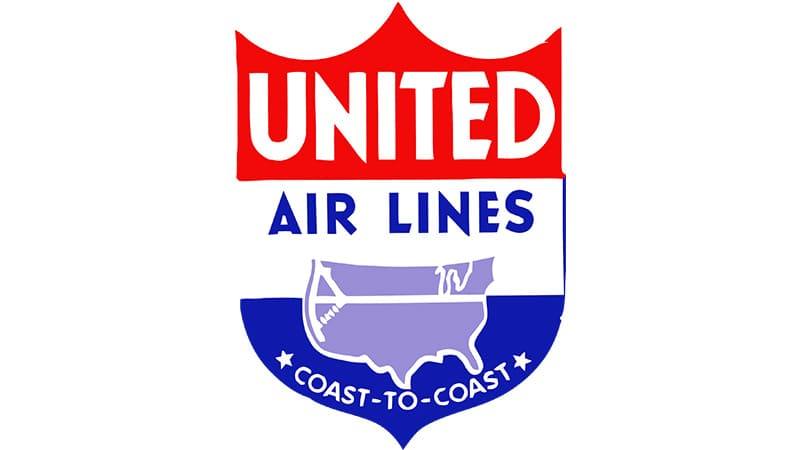
1937–1940

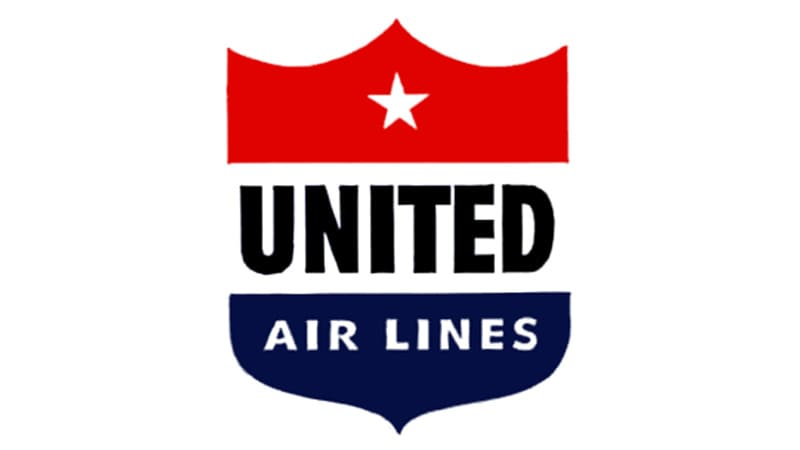
1940–1954

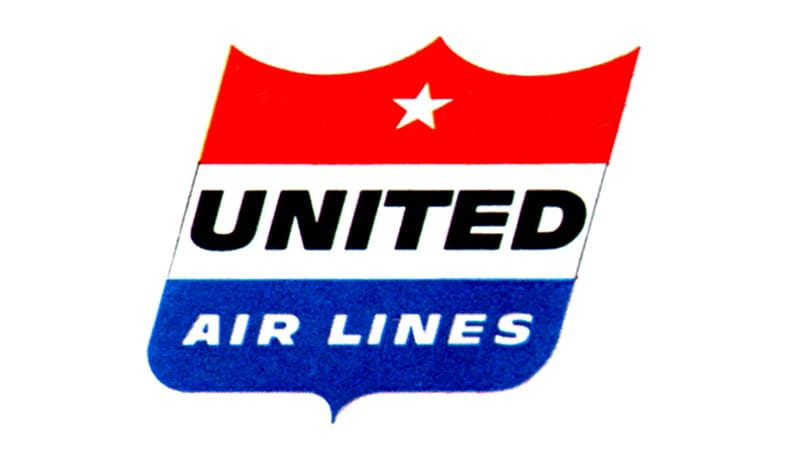
1954–1960

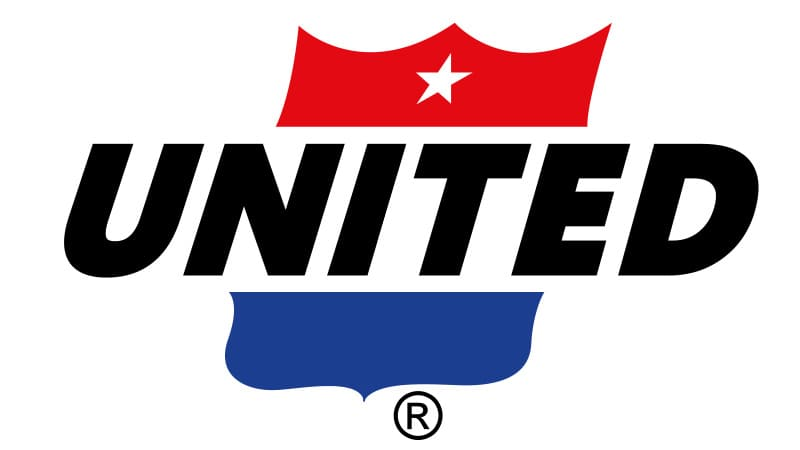
1960–1961

1961–1969

1969–1974

1974–1993

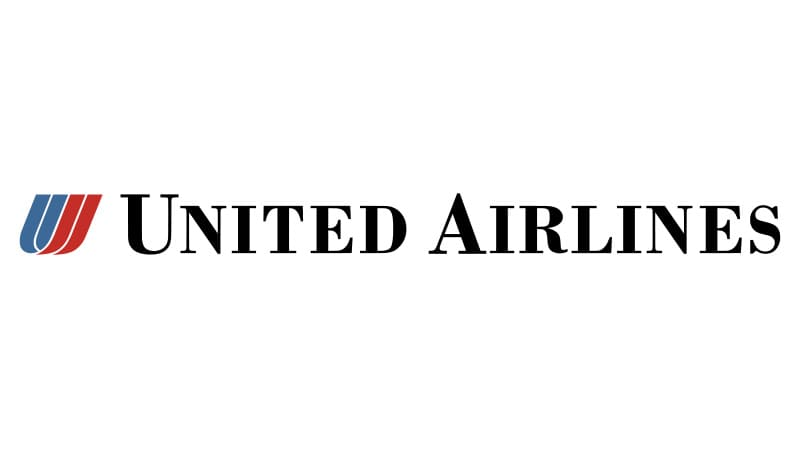
1993–1997

1997–2010

2010–present

United adopted a red, white and blue shield logo in 1939, which was updated in 1954, but its use varied widely and was eventually abandoned altogether in the early 1970s.

Starting in 1957, a new corporate personality began roll out which incorporated red and blue arrows, the word "United" and a shield symbol placed next to the name. In 1961, Raymond Loewy updated the logo to increase the size of the word "United" and replacing the existing navy blue color with a lighter blue.

Before 1974 and after the use of the shield logo was discontinued, United advertisements and signage usually advertised to customers to "Come Fly the Friendly Skies of United" (a campaign created by the Chicago-based advertising agency Leo Burnett and Company in the mid 1960s) in a font identical to the "United" font on the "Friendship" livery of the early 1970s.

In 1973, the airline commissioned designer Saul Bass to develop a new logo and livery. At the time, there was no real logo for the airline and Bass noted that the brand direction was not clearly evident stating "it was clear the stripes were part of a larger problem - the lack of any coherent point of view of what the airline should look like."

The "tulip" logo of colored stripes representing overlapping letter "U"s was in use beginning 1974, with only slight modifications, until the merger with Continental in 2010. Among employees at the time there was a suggestion that it was a double-U, i.e. "W", in recognition that United's acquisition of the Westin hotel chain had actually been the reverse, as Westin's president Ed Carlson had become United's CEO. The "Rainbow" (or "Saul Bass") livery, which was the first to feature the "tulip", had a primarily white fuselage, with red, orange and blue stripes along the "cheatline". This livery remained in use for 19 years, with a slight update in 1988 that moved the colored stripes further down the fuselage to allow the "UNITED" font to be larger than before. Marketing during this time continued the "Fly the Friendly Skies" slogan, and it was during this era that United acquired the rights to use Gerswhin's "Rhapsody in Blue", which started to be heard in broadcast advertisements. Other than the re-introduction in 1979 of the single word "AIRLINES" (once again appearing as "UNITED AIRLINES") in advertising and printed materials, the Bass branding would remain until early 1993.

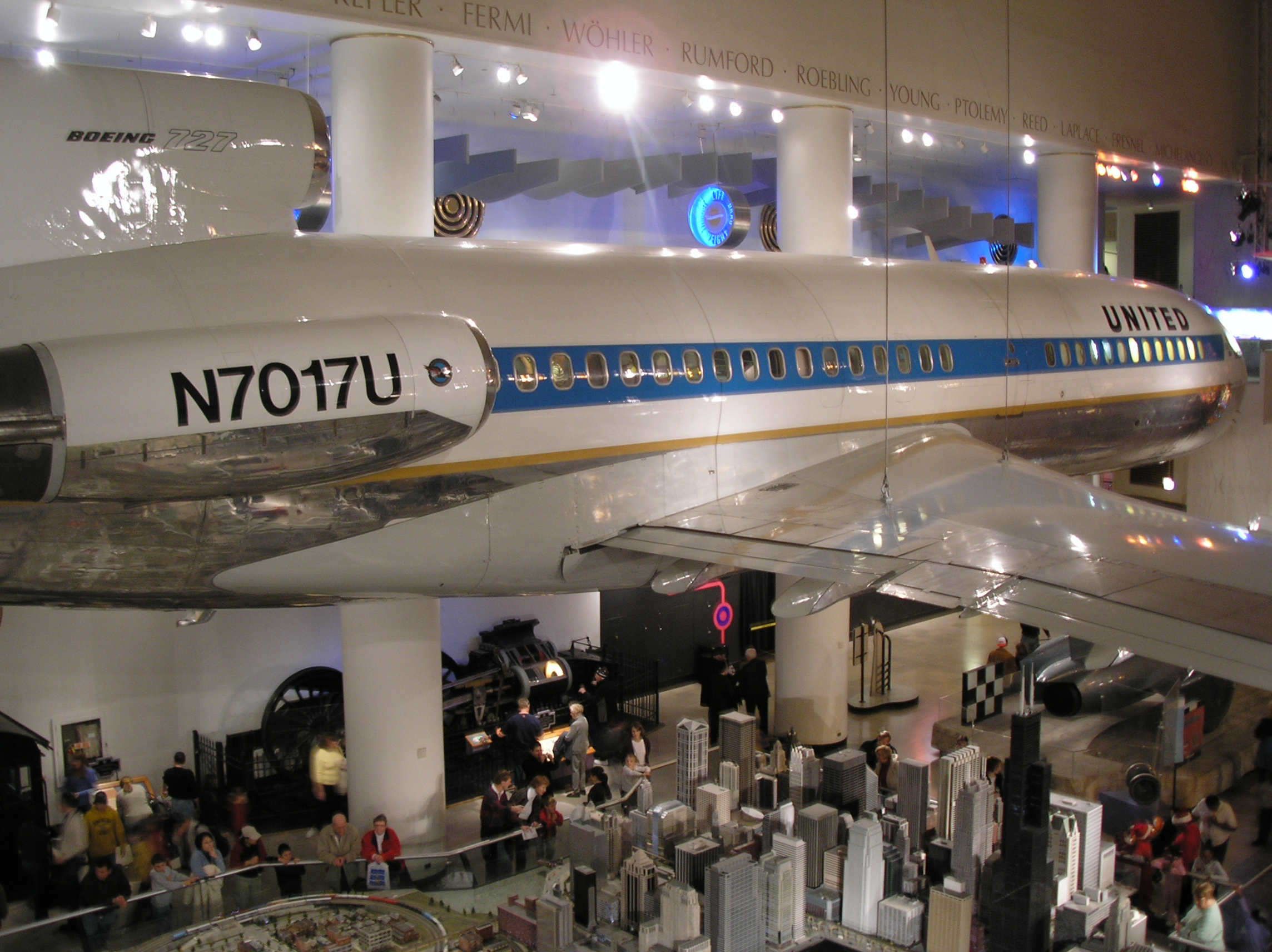
United 727 with Stars and Stripes scheme hanging overhead at the Museum of Science and Industry in Chicago

At the request of then-CEO Stephen Wolf in 1993, United completely revised its branding and livery, with the collaboration of CKS Group, to a primarily grey and dark blue fuselage, with blue stripes on the tail. A custom Times New Roman font, reading "UNITED AIRLINES" in white, replaced Saul Bass's previous lettering style. The familiar "tulip" logo remained, although slightly smaller. As a homage to the previous livery, narrow red, orange and blue stripes appeared between the grey and the dark blue. This so-called "Battleship" livery was intended to project a more business-like, global image for the airline, which was rapidly expanding internationally. Indeed, the words "Worldwide Service" were displayed near the front of the aircraft. Naturally, signage and printed materials reflected the change, often using the light blue on dark blue striped design of the aircraft tail-fin, along with the newly updated font and, of course, the "tulip."

In 1997, United commissioned Pentagram to update the brand. Pentagram soon decided to keep the "tulip", in view of its strong brand-recognition. Pentagram designed a new "UNITED" font that appeared in advertisements, signage and printed material, but did not appear on the aircraft themselves until United's next livery re-design. This arrived on February 18, 2004, when the "Rising Blue" (or "Blue Tulip") livery was introduced, intended to signal a fresh start once the company emerged from bankruptcy protection. As it turned out, United's bankruptcy took longer to resolve than expected; consequently the new branding was actually launched two years sooner. The fresh livery featured a white upper fuselage, replacing the dark grey of the previous design, and used a lighter shade of blue for the aircraft belly, tail and engines. In an echo of the previous two liveries, a series of progressively lighter blue lateral stripes lay between the white upper fuselage and the blue of the aircraft underside. The aircraft tail-fin featured an enlarged and cropped version of the "tulip," shaded with a bluish tint.

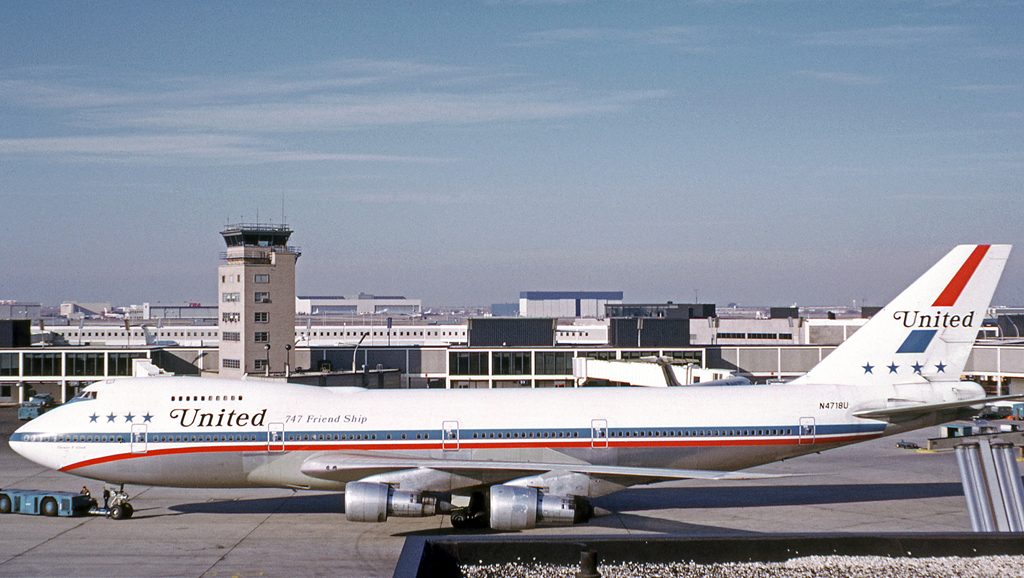
A 747 in pre-1974 "Stars and Bars" livery

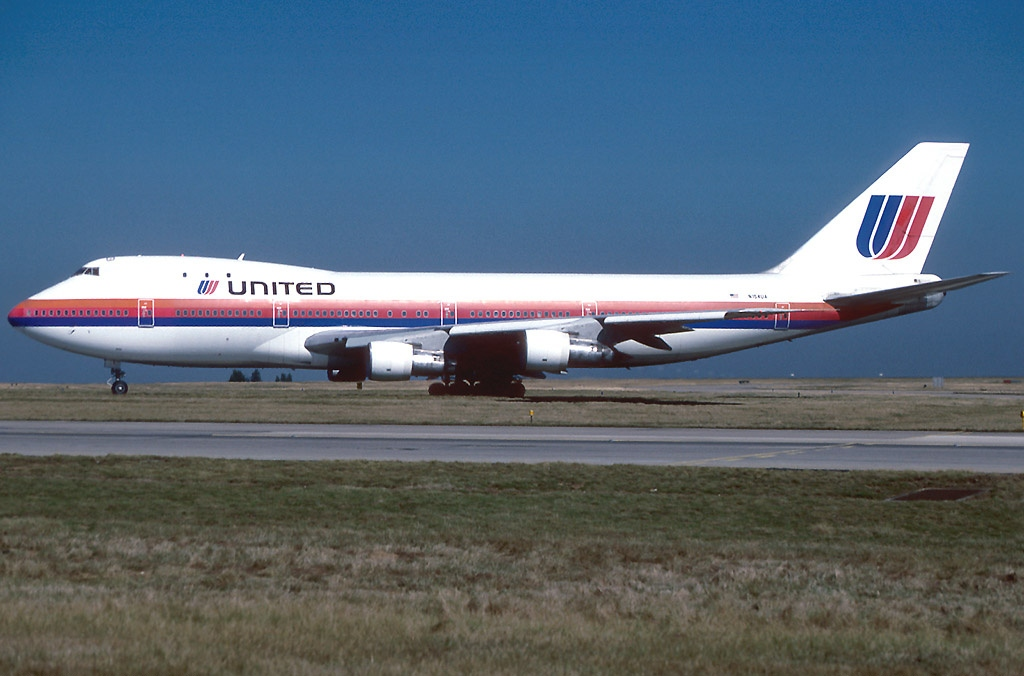
A Boeing 747-100 at Charles de Gaulle wearing Saul Bass-designed "Tulip" livery (1974–1993)

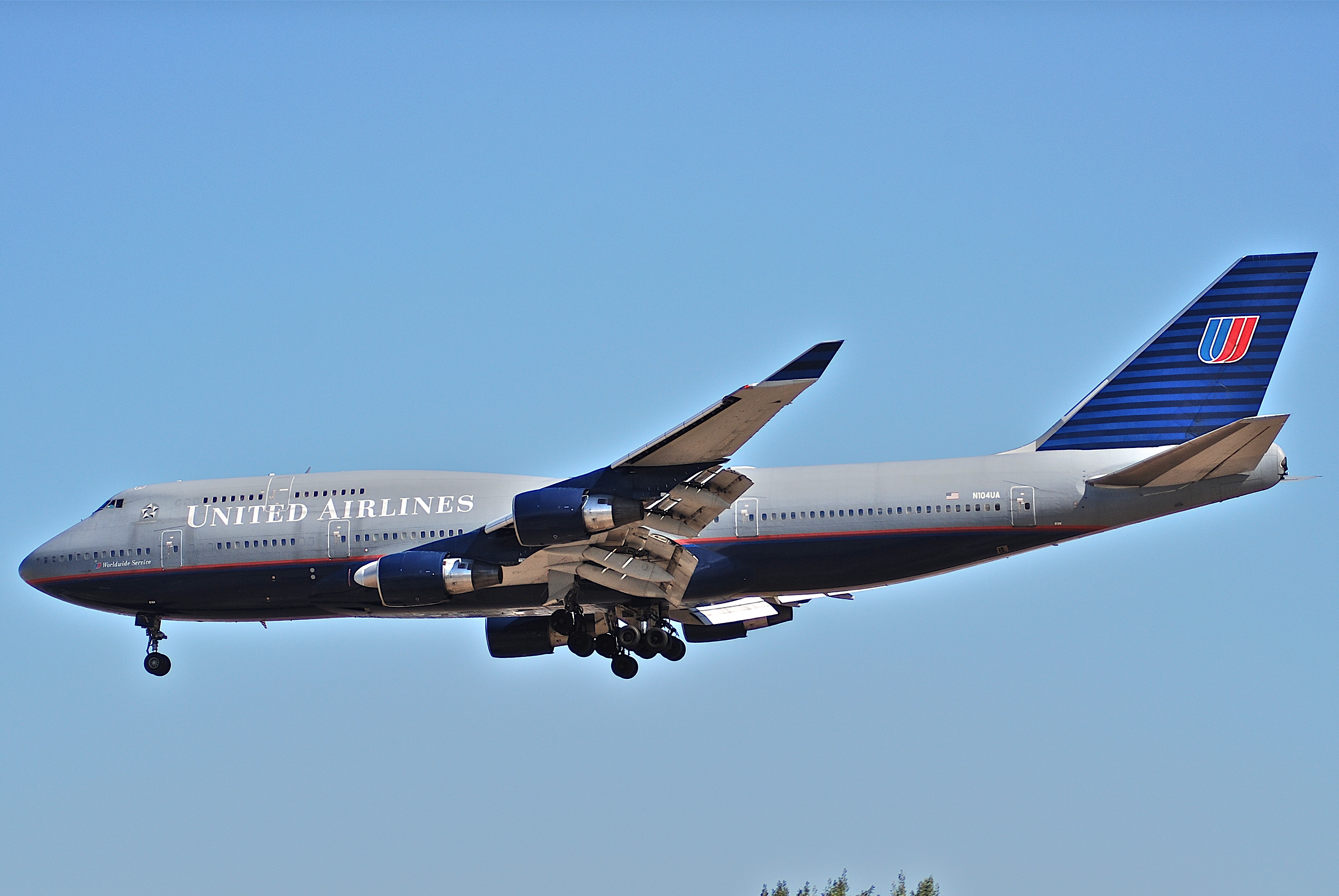
A Boeing 747-400 at Los Angeles International Airport wearing "Battleship" livery (1993–2004)

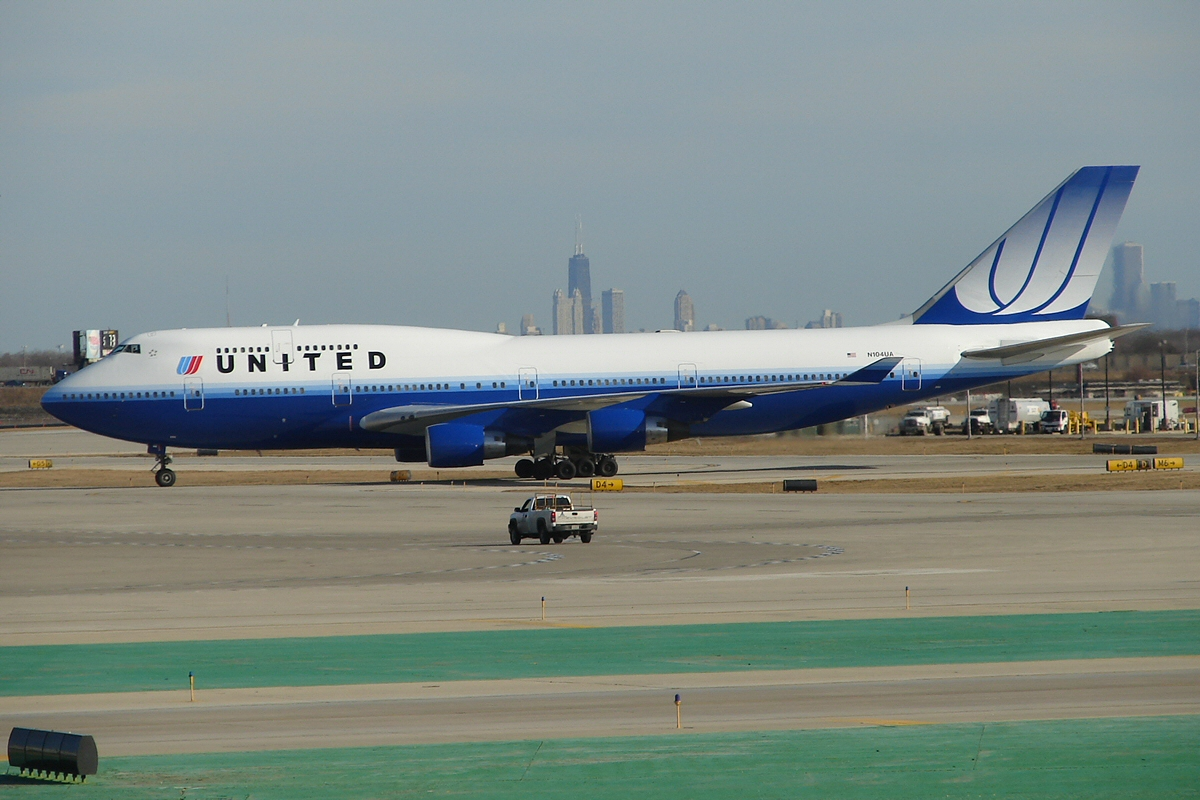
A Boeing 747-400 at O'Hare International Airport in "Rising Blue" or "Blue Tulip" livery (2004–2010)

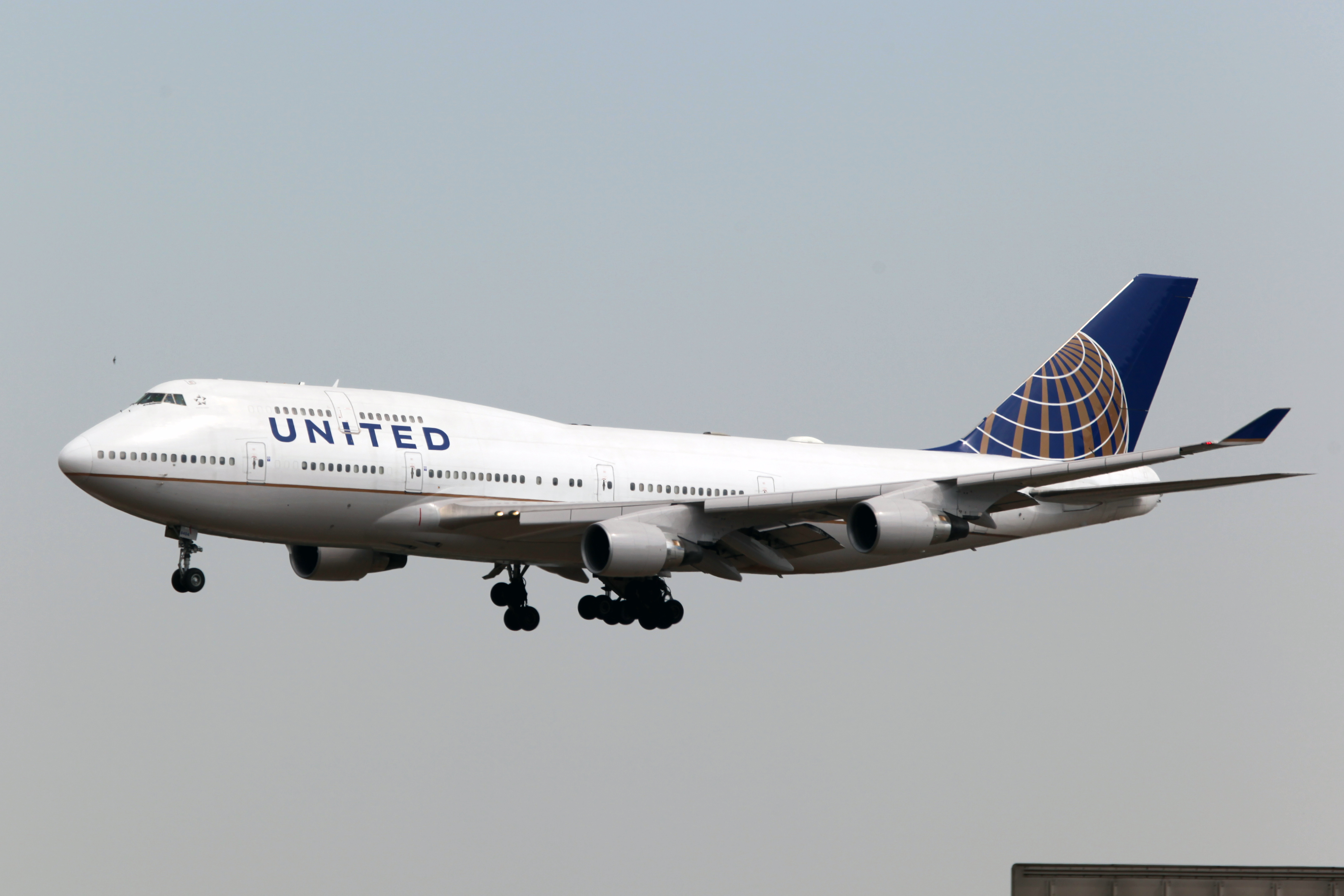
Post-merger Boeing 747-400 at Beijing Capital International Airport in ex-Continental "Golden Globe" livery (2010–2019)

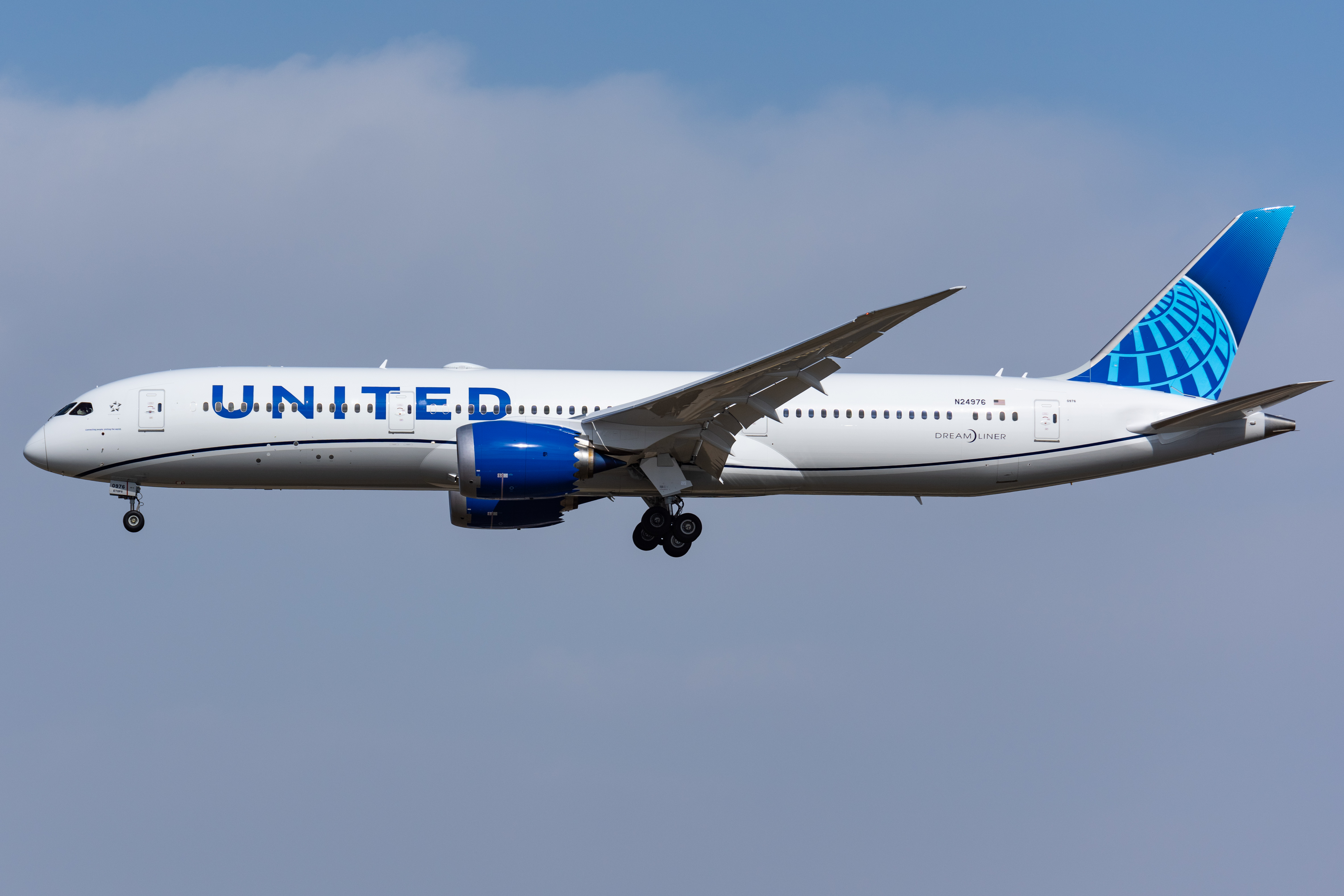
A Boeing 787-9 at Beijing Capital International Airport wearing the newest “Evo-Blue Globe” livery (2019–present)

On May 2, 2010, it was announced that United and Continental Airlines would merge. The combined airline took the United name but used the Continental Airlines "globe" symbol and livery, designed on February 12, 1991 by the Lippincott company. Mark Bergsrud, the head of United's new marketing department, said that the new logo reflected United's reach, ambition and the worldwide connections between people and places around the world along with the airline's efforts to attract corporate clients. Bergsrud said, "It fits who we are. We are not a niche player like Hawaiian, whose livery reflects the islands. Having some local flair is harder for an airline like us. Do we want to stand out? Absolutely. But spiffy liveries just have to fall to a lower level of priority." In conjunction with the newly adopted livery, on August 11, 2010, the "United" lettering was updated in accordance with the previous Continental typeface, but presented entirely in upper-case lettering and slightly adjusted to bear a resemblance to United's own previous style. The merger was approved on September 17, 2010 and was complete on October 1, 2010.

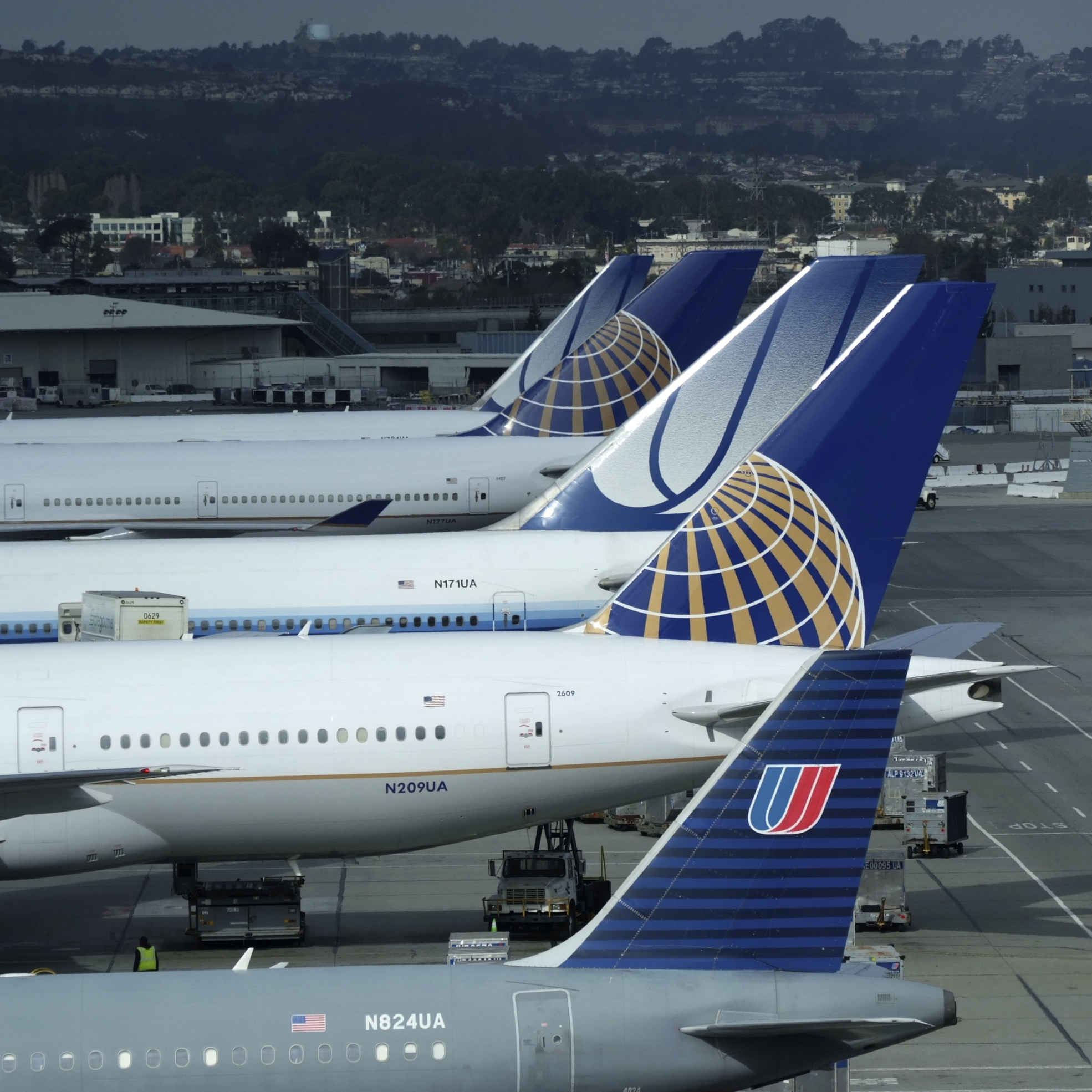
An assortment of United Airlines aircraft at San Francisco International Airport with post-merger Continental "globe" and earlier "tulip" logos in February 2011, including two Boeing 747-400s, two Boeing 777-200ERs, and one Airbus A319.

United unveiled an updated livery on April 24, 2019. The new livery retains the white upper fuselage and gray belly. The "United" typeface is larger, there is a dark blue wavy cheat-line (derived from the modified livery used on Boeing 787s and 737 MAXes), the engines, winglets, and tail are painted in the same shade of blue as the 2004–2010 livery and the globe on the tail is slightly enlarged and now in a lighter shade of blue.

Two United aircraft in regular service utilize heritage paint schemes. N75435 is a Boeing 737-900ER acquired in the Continental merger, painted in the 1950s Continental "Blue Skyways" livery since June 2016. Its sister, N75436 also acquired in the Continental merger, was painted in the same livery from June 2009 to April 2016. The other is N475UA, a legacy United Airbus A320 sporting United's 1970s "Stars and Bars" livery. The aircraft was previously painted in Ted colors and also operated with Blue Tulip paint from 2009 to the end of 2010, when it was painted into its current livery.

Another eleven aircraft, including five Boeing 777-200ERs, one Boeing 767-400ER, one Boeing 767-300ER, one Boeing 757-200, two Boeing 737-800s and one Boeing 737-700, are painted in the Star Alliance livery.

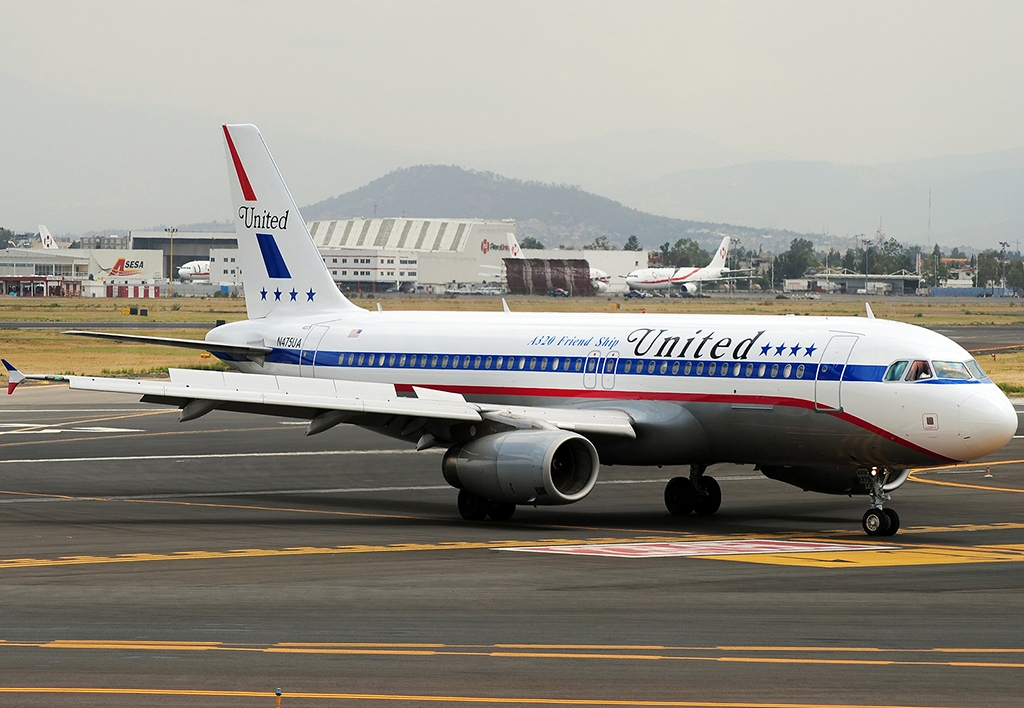
N475UA, the United "Stars and Bars" Airbus A320, taxiing at Mexico City International Airport in July 2011

Two aircraft are painted in a special livery commemorating United's use of sustainable aviation fuel. On these aircraft, the fuselage over the wings is painted in several shades of green, the fuselage immediately behind the wings in painted light blue, and the tail section is painted in the same shade of blue used on the engines. The livery made its debut in November 2024 on N24988, the first Boeing 787-9 to be delivered as part of United's December 2022 order. It will also be featured on a Boeing 737 MAX 10, N27602.

To commemorate America's 250th anniversary, in 2026, Boeing 787-10 N91007 and Boeing 737-800 N78285 were painted in a "Stars and Stripes" livery. On these aircraft, the fuselage is painted dark blue, broken up by the red and white stripes of the American flag over the wings. The rear of the aircraft is adorned in stars representing the 50 states.

=== Slogans ===
The early slogan "The Main Line Airway," emphasizing its signature New York-Chicago-San Francisco route, was replaced in 1965 with "Fly the Friendly Skies." The "friendly skies" tagline was used until 1996, yet revived on September 20, 2013. Other United Slogans include:

- "The Extra Care Airline (1963–1964)
- "When you're friendly you do things for people" (1971)
- "The Great Wide Way to New York" (1971–1972)
- "Your Land is Our Land" (1972)
- "The Friendly Skies of your land" (also known as "Mother Country", 1973–1976)
- "You're the boss" (1976–1977),
- "United we fly" (1977–1978)
- "United all the way" (1979–1980)
- "That's what friendly skies are all about" (1980)
- "You're not just flying, you're flying the Friendly Skies" (mid-1980s)
- "Official Airline of the 1984 Olympic Games" (1984 Summer Olympics)
- "From the ground up, rededicated to giving you the service you deserve. Come fly the friendly skies" (Late 1980s)
- "Come fly the airline that's uniting the world. Come fly the Friendly Skies" (late 1980s)
- "Come fly our Friendly Skies" (The early ESOP years)
- "Airline of the U.S. Olympic Team" (Used during the 1988 Summer Olympics)
- "United. Rising." during the late 1990s
- "Come fly Chicago's hometown airline. Come fly the friendly skies."
- "Feel United ... Be United ... Worlds United ... Stay United ... United" (the late 1990s)
- "It's important for the human race to stay United"
- "Life is a journey – travel it well; United"
- "We Are United" following the September 11 attacks; used until 2004
- "Relax, Stretch Out" with the rollout of EconomyPlus
- "It's time to fly" (2004–2010) This was used for the animated commercials (voiced over by Robert Redford), banners, and magazine advertisements of the campaign first unveiled during Super Bowl XXXVIII. The campaign was reintroduced in August 2008 when United premiered five new TV commercials during the 2008 Summer Olympics.
- "Let's fly together" (2010–2013)
- "Before they move us, we move them."/"Proud to fly Team USA for over 30 years." (2012–2021) (Used during the 2012 Summer Olympics to promote United as the official airline of the U.S. Olympic Team for more than 30 years. Matt Damon did a voice over for the United Team USA commercials, which premiered during NBC's telecast of the Summer Olympics on July 27, 2012.)
- "Fly the Friendly Skies" (2013–present)
- "Connecting people. Uniting the world." (2017–present)
- "Good Leads The Way" (2022–present)

== Former hubs ==
- Cleveland Hopkins International Airport – United Airlines maintained a secondary East Coast hub at Cleveland until 1985, when it began a move to Washington Dulles. By the time the transition finished in 1987, Continental Airlines had established Cleveland as its fifth hub and first Midwest hub. United maintained the hub for four years following the 2010 United-Continental merger. On February 1, 2014, United announced it was dehubbing Cleveland due to lack of profitability and its proximity to the Chicago–O'Hare hub.
- Miami International Airport – with the acquisition of Pan Am's international routes from Miami to Europe and Latin America in 1991, Miami became a hub for the airline. In May 2004, MIA was dehubbed and its flights were transferred to Chicago.
- Tokyo Narita International Airport – The ninth-largest hub for both destinations and flights and United's hub for Asia. Narita was the smallest of United's six hubs before the United-Continental merger in 2010. In its 2017 Annual Report United no longer listed Tokyo-Narita as a hub.
- Stapleton International Airport – Both United and Continental operated hubs at Denver International Airport's predecessor airport, with both hubs active from 1972 until the airport closed in 1995. When Stapleton was replaced with DIA, United transferred operations, but Continental discontinued its Denver hub.

== Historical fleet ==
United Airlines retired fleet
Aircraft	Introduced	Retired	Replacement	Notes
Boeing 40A	1927	1937		Launch customer Operated as Boeing Air Transport; also operated by Varney Air Lines
Boeing 80A	1928	1934	Unknown	Launch customer Operated as Boeing Air Transport
Boeing 247	1933	1942	Unknown	Launch customer All 59 of the base model were built for United Airlines
Boeing 377 Stratocruiser	Unknown	1954	Unknown	
Boeing 720	1960	1976	Boeing 727	Launch Customer
Boeing 727-100	1963	1993	Boeing 737-500	
Boeing 727-200	1968	2001	Airbus A320 family	
Boeing 737-200	1968	2001	Airbus A320 family	
Boeing 737-300	1986	2009	Airbus A320 family	
Boeing 737-500	1990	2009	Airbus A320 family Boeing 737 Next Generation	United's original 737-500 fleet had been retired by 2009. More 737-500s were inherited from the merger with Continental Airlines in 2010 and these were retired by May 2013.
Boeing 737-500	2010	2013	Airbus A320 family Boeing 737 Next Generation	United's original 737-500 fleet had been retired by 2009. More 737-500s were inherited from the merger with Continental Airlines in 2010 and these were retired by May 2013.
Boeing 747-100	1970	1999	Boeing 747-400; Boeing 777-200/-200ER	
Boeing 747-200	1987	2000	Boeing 747-400; Boeing 777-200/-200ER	Acquired from Pan American World Airways
Boeing 747SP	1985	1995	Boeing 747-400; Boeing 777-200; Boeing 767-300ER	10 taken over from Pan American World Airways. N539PA re-registeted as N148UA, leased to Amir of Qatar as VR-BAT (later as VP-BAT) from 1995 to 2018 and now as N7477S.
Boeing 747-400	1989	2017	Boeing 777-300ER; Boeing 787-9/-10	The last United 747, dubbed the "Friendship" – a reference to United's original branding for its DC-10 and 747-100 fleet in the 1970s – was taken on a hub to hub tour around the United States, before taking a final ticketed flight from San Francisco to Honolulu, reprising the inaugural scheduled flight of a United Boeing 747.
Boeing 767-200	1982	2005	Boeing 757-200	Launch Customer. The launch order in 1978 for 30 767s, together with an order for 30 727-200s for the interim period, totaled $1.2 million, nearly twice the size of the previous largest ever airline order, PanAm's launch for the 747.
Boeing 767-200ER	2011	2013	Boeing 757-200; Boeing 767-300ER Boeing 787-8	Inherited from Continental Airlines
Convair 340	Unknown	1968	Unknown	
Douglas DC-3	1936	Unknown	Convair 340	
Douglas DC-6	1947	1970	Unknown	Fleet included DC-6 and DC-6B aircraft
Douglas DC-7	Unknown	1964	Unknown	
Douglas DC-8	1959	1992	Boeing 757-200	Largest DC-8 operator Fleet included stretched DC-8 "Super 60" series and re-engined "Super 70" series aircraft. The re-engining of its Super DC-8 fleet was carried out in-house. One crashed in 1960 as Flight 826.
Ford Trimotor	Unknown	Unknown	Boeing 247	Operated in 1931 on a transcontinental route between New York City and San Francisco.
Lockheed L-1011 TriStar	1986	1989		Taken over from Pan American World Airways
McDonnell Douglas DC-10	1971	2001	Boeing 747-400 Boeing 767-300ER; Boeing 777-200/-200ER	Launch Customer; Fleet included original DC-10-10 variants and DC-10-30 variants One crashed in 1989 as Flight 232.
Sud Aviation Caravelle	1961	1970	Boeing 727; Boeing 737-200	Only US operator of the Caravelle in scheduled passenger service, it was used primarily to provide frequent service between Chicago and New York.
Laird Swallow J-5	Unknown	Unknown	Unknown	Single seat biplane used to carry US Air Mail (CAM 5) by predecessor Varney Air Lines.
Vickers Viscount	1961	1969	Boeing 727; Boeing 737 Original	Former Capital Airlines aircraft. Only mainline turboprop aircraft type ever operated by United Airlines.
