= Pacific Air Transport =

1926–1928 US airline

| IATA | ICAO | Call sign |
|---|---|---|
| - | - | - |
- Founded: January 1926; 100 years ago
- Commenced operations: 15 September 1926; 99 years ago
- Ceased operations: 17 December 1928; 97 years ago (acquired by Boeing Air Transport)
- Fleet size: 10 Ryan M-1
- Destinations: Seattle, Washington; Los Angeles, California
- Key people: Vern C. Gorst (Founder)

Pacific Air Transport was an early US airline, formed in 1926 for carrying mail as well as passengers. It was acquired two years later by Boeing Air Transport.

== Early history ==
Pacific Air Transport (PAT) was formed in January 1926 by Vern C. Gorst, an Oregon bus line operator. He saw the potential competition that would arise from the award by the United States Post Office Department of contracts to carry airmails. Airmail Route CAM 8 was planned by the USPO to carry the post from Seattle, Washington to Los Angeles, California via several intermediate cities. Gorst arranged for the route to be carefully surveyed by T. Claude Ryan in one of his new Ryan M-1 aircraft. This was because the airmail aircraft would have to traverse the 7,000 ft Siskiyou Mountains on the Oregon-California border.

== Early operations ==
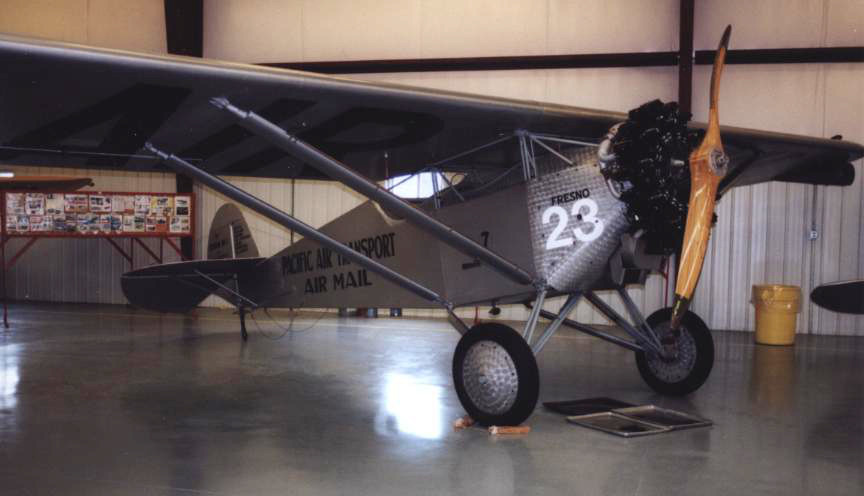
An airworthy Ryan M-1 mailplane in Pacific Air Transport markings at the Historic Aircraft Restoration Museum

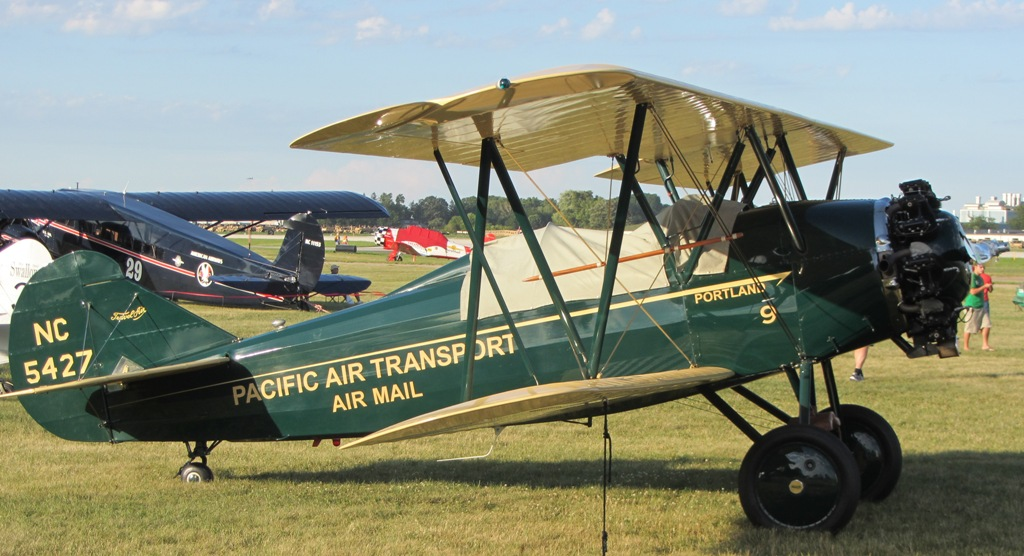
A P.A.T. Travel Air 3000

Gorst's new airline successfully bid for Route CAM 8 and contracted to purchase a fleet of ten Ryan M-1 mailplanes. These had a four-seat enclosed cabin because Gorst planned to carry fare-paying passengers as well as mail and express parcels. The service was inaugurated on 15 September 1926 after arrangements had been made for the provision of makeshift lights and beacons, and persuading the Standard Oil Company to paint the names of towns on the roofs of its buildings. Despite these precautions, by the end of the winter, three of the M-1 aircraft had been lost.

The hardy passengers had to pay $132 for the doubtful privilege of being crammed in among the mailbags for the 18-hour flights. Intermediate landings were made for fuel and mail at Portland and Medford in Oregon and San Francisco, Fresno and Bakersfield in California. The route was operated daily in each direction.

== Acquisition by Boeing Air Transport ==
Pacific Air Transport's main north-south airmail and passenger route continued in operation throughout 1927. However, Gorst did not make comfortable profits as the airmail loads were not as bulky as on some other CAM routes. He therefore sought the help of aviation entrepreneurs. Bill Boeing proved to be interested in the airline and his Boeing Air Transport acquired control of PAT on 1 January 1928. This immediately provided a market for new aircraft as six four-passenger Boeing 40Bs were supplied to the airline during 1928.

On 17 December 1928, PAT merged into Boeing Air Transport, but continued to operate as a separate division, retaining its own identity.

== See also ==
- List of defunct airlines of the United States
