= Boeing Model 40 =

1925 mailplane family by Boeing

Model 40
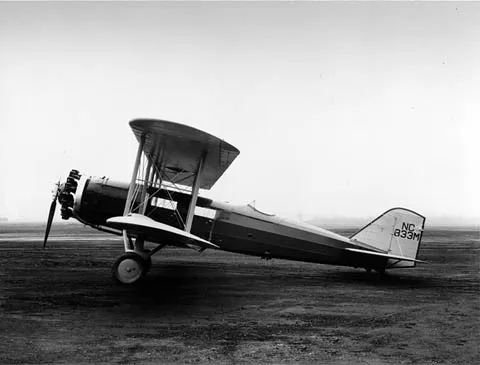

General information
- Type: Mail plane
- Manufacturer: Boeing
- Primary users: Boeing Air Transport Varney Air Lines; Pacific Air Transport
- Number built: ca. 80

History
- Introduction date: July 1, 1927
- First flight: July 20, 1925

The Boeing Model 40 is a United States mail plane of the 1920s. It was a single-engined biplane that was widely used for airmail services in the United States in the 1920s and 1930s, especially by airlines that later became part of United Airlines. It became the first aircraft built by the Boeing company to carry passengers.

== Development and design ==
In 1925, the U.S. Post Office issued a requirement for a mail plane to replace the ex-military DH-4s then in use. The new aircraft was required to use the same water-cooled Liberty V12 engine as used by the DH-4, of which large stocks of war-built engines were available. The resultant aircraft, the Boeing Model 40, was a conventional tractor biplane, with the required Liberty engine housed in a streamlined cowling with an underslung radiator. The aircraft's fuselage had a steel tube structure, with an aluminum and laminated wood covering. Up to 1,000 lb (450 kg) of mail was carried in two compartments in the forward fuselage, while the single pilot sat in an open cockpit in the rear fuselage. The wings and tail were of wooden construction, and the Model 40 had a fixed conventional landing gear.

The Model 40 made its first flight on July 7, 1925. Although the prototype was purchased by the U.S. Post Office, the production order went to the Douglas M-2.

Model 40C at Oshkosh 2008. Both passenger entry doors, one for each of the two-seat rows, are on the left side of the fuselage.

The Contract Air Mail Act of 1925 set out the gradual privatization of the Post Office's Air Mail routes. In late 1926, bids were requested for the main transcontinental trunk mail route, which was to be split into eastern and western sections, with Boeing bidding for the western section. Boeing revived the design for the tender, with the Model 40A replacing the Liberty engine with a 425 hp (317 kW) air-cooled Pratt & Whitney Wasp radial engine, which was 200 lb (91 kg) lighter than the Liberty, even ignoring the weight of the Liberty's radiator and cooling water. The fuselage was redesigned to make more extensive use of welded steel tubing, and an enclosed cabin was fitted between the mail compartments, allowing two passengers to be carried as well as 1,200 lb (540 kg) of mail. Boeing's bid of $3 per lb was much less than any of the competing bids, and Boeing was awarded the San Francisco to Chicago contract in January 1927, building 24 Model 40As for the route (with a further aircraft being used as a testbed by Pratt & Whitney).

The next model to reach production was the Model 40C, with an enlarged cabin allowing four passengers to be carried. Meanwhile, Boeing Air Transport's Model 40As were modified by replacing their Wasp engines with 525 hp (391 kW) Pratt & Whitney Hornet radial engines to become the Model 40B-2. The Model 40B-4 was a new-build aircraft combining the four-passenger cabin of the Model 40C with the Hornet engine of the B-2. Production continued until February 1932.

== Operational history ==
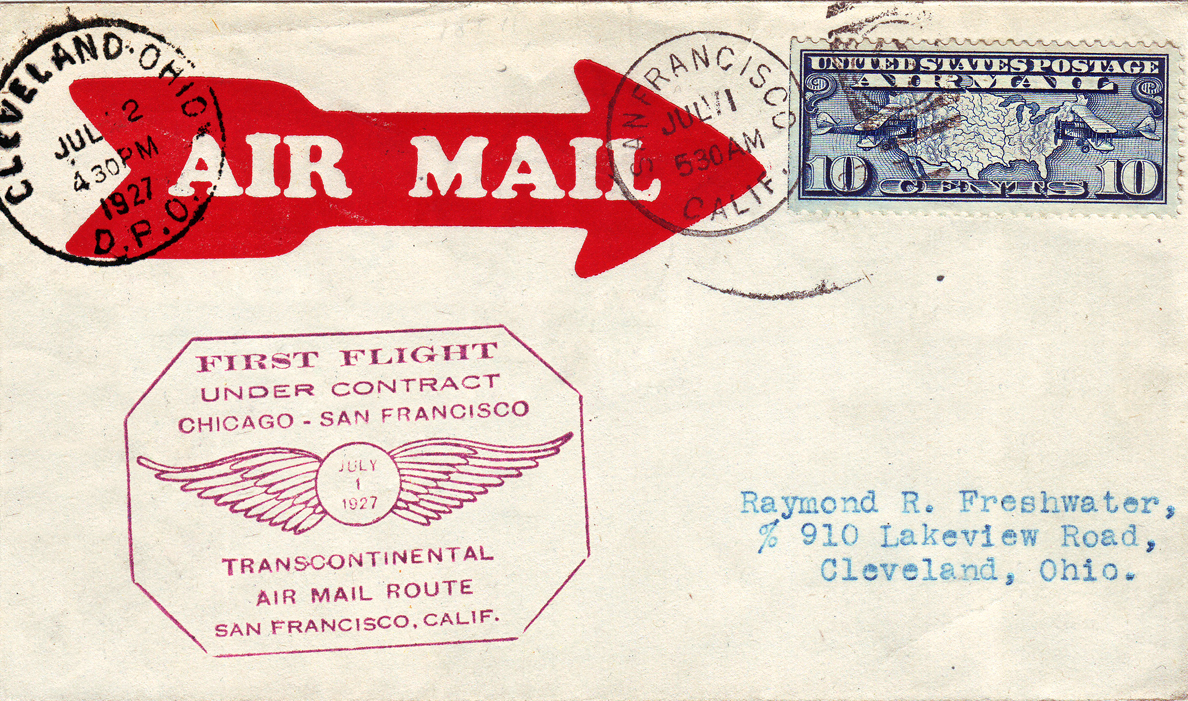
Cover flown from San Francisco to Chicago by a Model 40A operated by Boeing Air Transport on the first day U.S. Transcontinental Air Mail under Contract. July 1, 1927

Boeing's airline, Boeing Air Transport, commenced operations on the San Francisco–Chicago route on July 1, 1927.

== Variants ==
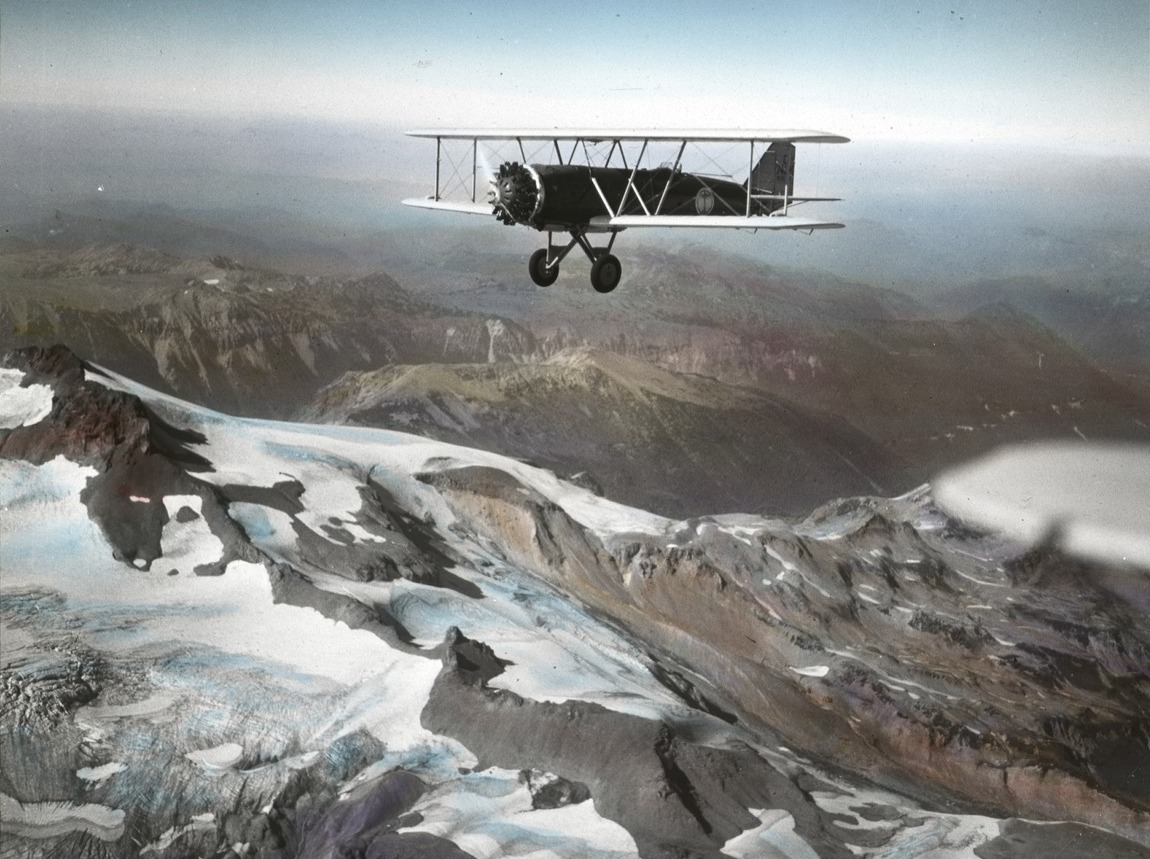
A Boeing Model 40 flying over mountains in Washington State, 1930s.

Model 40
Original 1925 design with Liberty engine.
Model 40A
Revised 1927 design for BATC. the aircraft was powered by a Pratt & Whitney Wasp radial engine, plus seating for two passengers in an enclosed cabin; 25 built. Received Dept of Air Commerce Approved Type Certificate #2.
Model 40B
Model 40As re-engined with a 525 hp (391 kW) Pratt & Whitney Hornet radial piston engine. 19 Model 40A were converted. Redesignated Model 40B-2.
Model 40B-4
Revised Model 40B with seating for four passengers and other improvements. Equipped with openable windows, plus seating for four passengers; 38 built.
Model 40B-4A
One Model 40B used as engine testbed by Pratt & Whitney.
Model 40H-4
Four Model 40B-4s built by Boeing Canada. Two aircraft were exported to New Zealand.
Model 40C
Similar to Model 40B-4 but with Pratt & Whitney Wasp engine of Model 40A. (ten built, all later converted to Model 40B-4 standard).
Model 40X
Unique special-order machine similar to Model 40C with only two-passenger cabin and extra open cockpit forward of pilot's cockpit.
Model 40Y
Unique special-order machine similar to Model 40X, but with Pratt & Whitney Hornet engine.

== Operators ==
Honduras

- Honduran Air Force

United States

- Boeing Air Transport

== Accidents and incidents ==
- February 26, 1928: A Boeing Air Transport Model 40B (c/n 891, registration NC280) crashed near Marquette, Nebraska after the aircraft struck trees when flying low to avoid air turbulence; the passenger was killed, but the pilot survived.
- April 17, 1928: A Boeing Air Transport Model 40B (c/n 893, registration NC282) crashed at Federal, Wyoming, killing one of two on board.
- October 2, 1928: A Pacific Air Transport Model 40C (c/n 1043, registration NC5339) crashed on Canyon Mountain near Canyonville, Oregon, killing one of two on board.
- November 18, 1930: A Pacific Air Transport Model 40B-4 (c/n 1036, registration NC5340) crashed into a mountainside at 4500 feet in a snowstorm, killing all three on board.
- January 22, 1931: A Varney Air Lines Model 40B-4 (c/n 1148, registration NC741K) crashed into Bluff Mountain in dense fog, killing the pilot.
- May 5, 1931: A Pacific Air Transport Model 40B-4 (c/n 1044, registration NC5390) crashed in La Tuna Canyon in the Verdugo Mountains while attempting to land at Burbank Airport in low visibility, killing both crew.
- September 16, 1931: A Pacific Air Transport Model 40B-4 (c/n 1428, registration NC10347) crashed into San Francisco Bay after takeoff for reasons unknown, killing all four on board.
- November 23, 1931: A Boeing Air Transport Model 40, registration NC7465, crashed eight miles west of Salt Lake Airport, killing the pilot; it was believed that the plane overturned while attempting to land at night.
- November 26, 1931: A Varney Air Lines Model 40B-4 (c/n 1419, registration NC10338) crashed near Pasco, Washington in low visibility while attempting to land, killing the pilot.
- February 2, 1932: A Boeing Air Transport Model 40, registration NC7470, crashed on landing at Rio Vista, California; the plane struck an irrigation ditch and caught fire, killing one of two on board.
- February 7, 1932: A Boeing Air Transport Model 40B, registration NC273, crashed near Knight, Wyoming in a heavy snowstorm, killing the pilot.
- May 3, 1932: A Varney Air Lines Model 40B-4 (c/n 1155, registration NC830M) crashed at Portland, Oregon, killing both crew.
- May 16, 1932: A Pacific Air Transport Model 40, registration NC5589, crashed and burned in fog while attempting to land at Burbank Airport, killing all three (both pilots, radioman) on board.
- December 14, 1932: A Boeing Air Transport Model 40B-4 (c/n 1168, registration NC842M) crashed at Rocky Ridge, Colorado, killing the pilot.

== Surviving aircraft ==
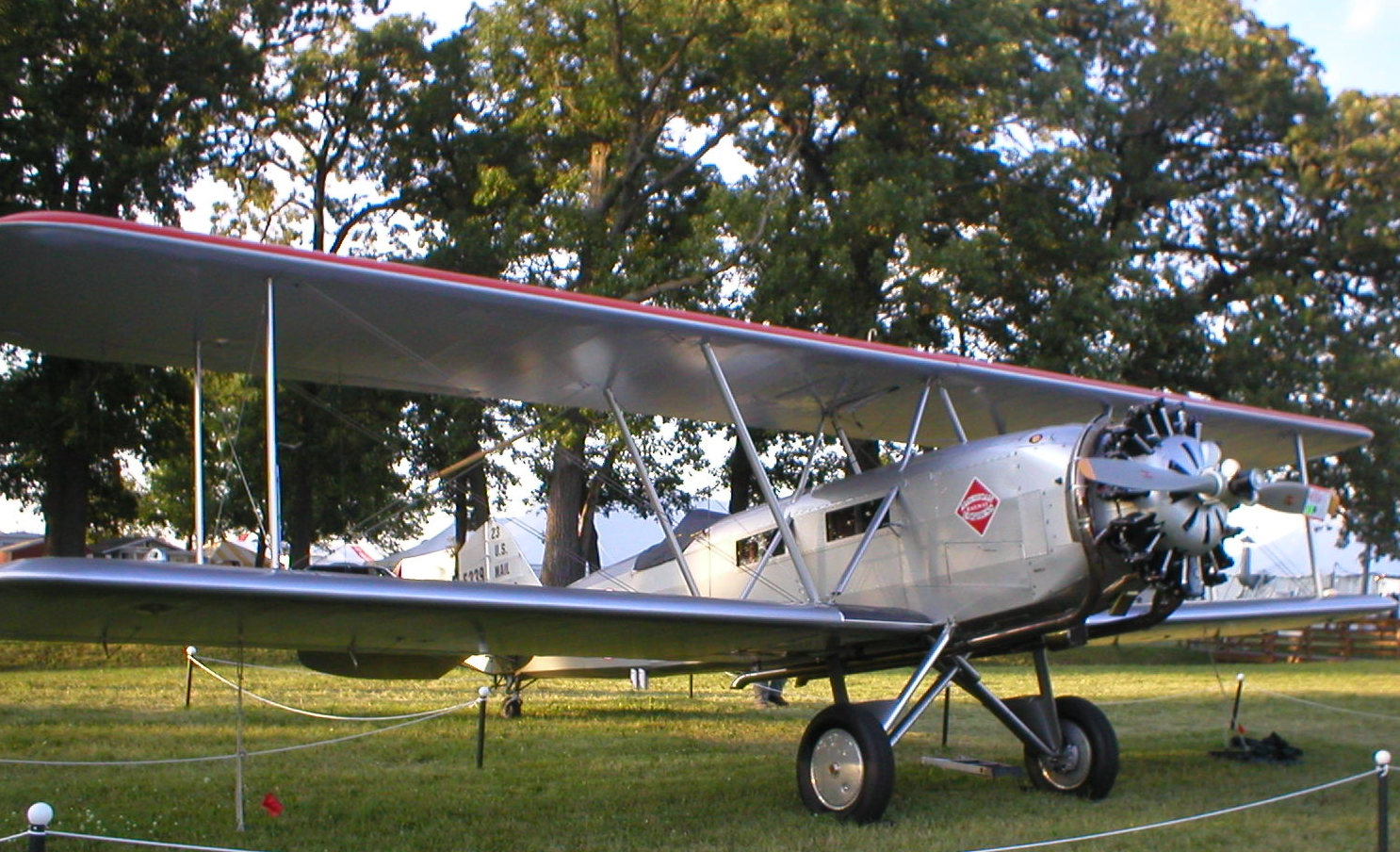
Boeing Model 40C at Oshkosh 2008

As of February 17, 2008, Boeing 40C c/n 1043 became the only airworthy example in the world. It also holds the title of the oldest flying Boeing in the world. In 1928, the aircraft was substantially damaged in a crash near Canyonville, OR. After being recovered, it was completely rebuilt over an eight-year period from 2000 to 2008 and an estimated 18,000 man hours by Pemberton and Sons Aviation in Spokane, Washington. On May 8, 2010, this airplane had an aerial rendezvous with Boeing's newest passenger aircraft, the Boeing 787 Dreamliner. In September, 2017, it was sold to the Western Antique Aeroplane & Automobile Museum in Hood River, Oregon. It remains airworthy and flies on special occasions.

The Henry Ford Museum in Dearborn, Michigan, contains a 1927 Boeing 40B-2, number 285.

The Museum of Science and Industry in Chicago, Illinois has a 1928 Boeing Model 40-B on display in its Transportation Gallery. (N288)

The Museum of Flight in Seattle, Washington has a complete full-scale replica and two partially finished replica fuselages (showing what the original Boeing factory would have looked like circa 1928-29) on display.

== Specifications (Model 40A) ==
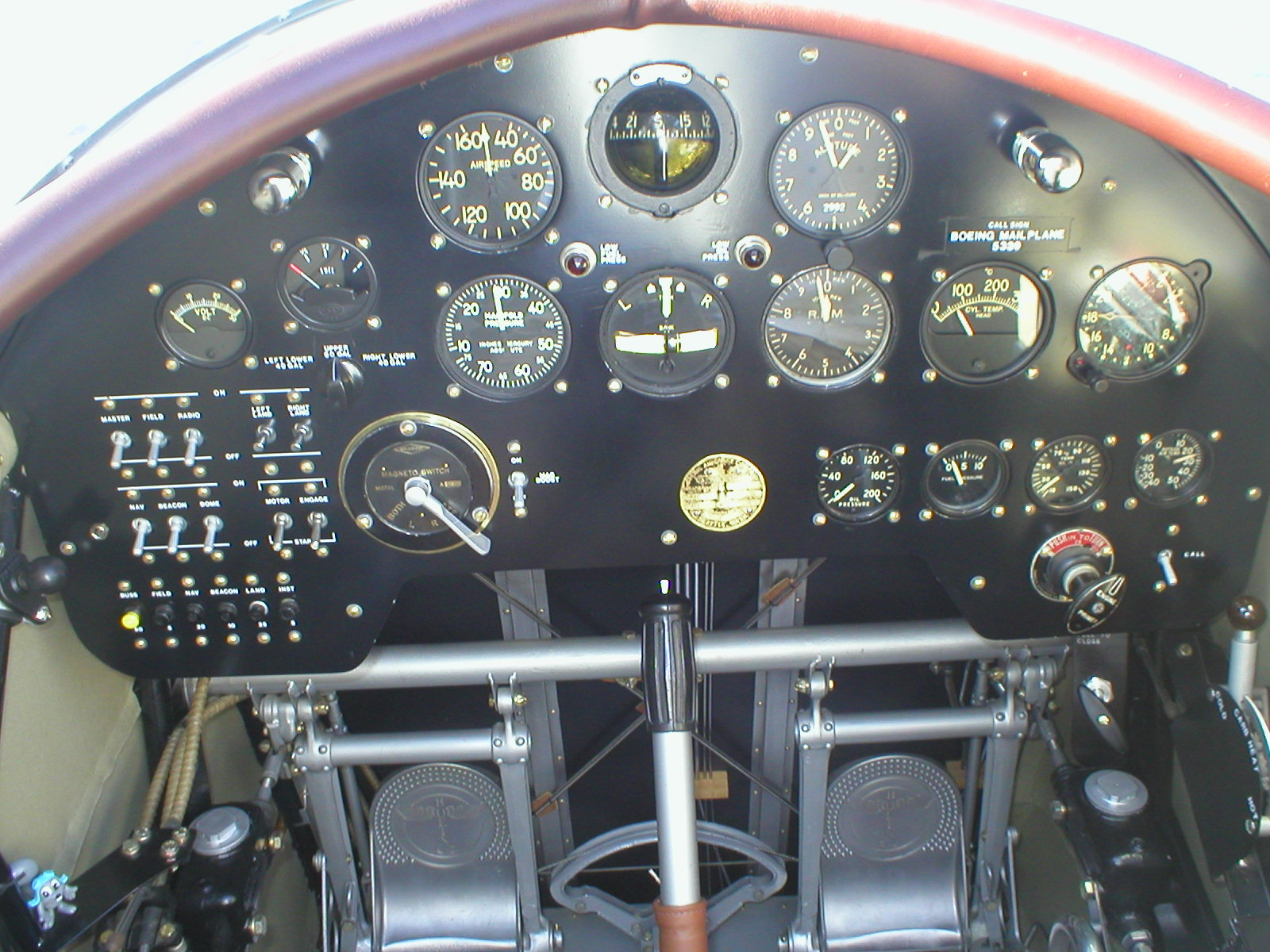
Model 40C Pilot's panel with some modern features added for safe operation

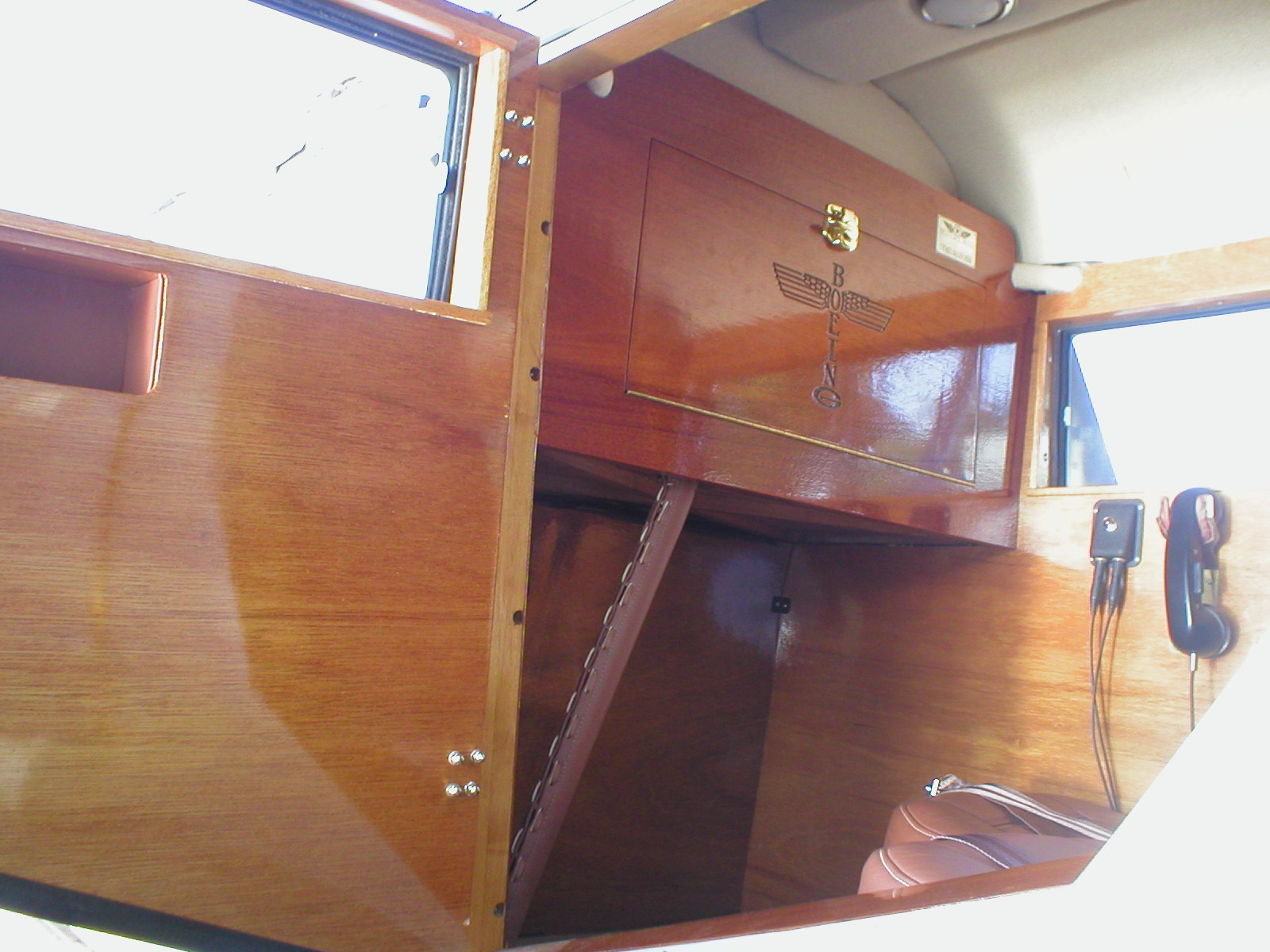
Model 40C front seat of rear passenger cabin showing the fold-down writing desk/table

Data from Boeing Aircraft since 1916

General characteristics

- Crew: one
- Capacity: two passengers and 1,200 lb (540 kg) mail
- Length: 33 ft 2.25 in (10.12 m)
- Wingspan: 44 ft 2.25 in (13.47 m)
- Height: 12 ft 3.1 in (3.74 m)
- Wing area: 547 sq ft (50.82 m^{2})
- Empty weight: 3,531 lb (1,605 kg)
- Max takeoff weight: 6,000 lb (2,727 kg)
- Powerplant: 1 × Pratt & Whitney Wasp , 420 hp (313 kW)

Performance

- Maximum speed: 128 mph (206 km/h, 111 kn)
- Cruise speed: 105 mph (169 km/h, 91 kn)
- Range: 650 mi (1,046 km, 565 nmi)
- Service ceiling: 14,500 ft (4,420 m)
- Rate of climb: 770 ft/min (3.9 m/s)
