= Terminals of Los Angeles International Airport =

Map of LAX showing Terminals 1 through 8, plus the Tom Bradley International Terminal (B) and the Regional Terminal (R)

Los Angeles International Airport has 161 gates in nine passenger terminals arranged in the shape of the letter U or a horseshoe. On the landside of the airport, LAX Shuttle route A buses allow passengers to move between all terminals. On the airside, various pedestrian corridors allow passengers to move between all terminals on foot without having to exit and reenter airport security. Additionally, the airport will be served by SkyLink, which will connect terminals to one another on the landside, along with providing connections to the LAX Rental Car Center, parking facilities, and the LAX/Metro Transit Center, which is served by the Los Angeles Metro Rail system and public bus routes. In addition to these terminals, there are 2 million square feet (190,000 m^{2}) of cargo facilities.

== History ==
The basic layout of the airport dates back to 1958 when the architecture firm Pereira & Luckman was contracted to plan the re-design of the airport for the "jet age." The plan, developed with architects Welton Becket and Paul Williams, called for a series of terminals and parking structures in the central portion of the property, with these buildings connected at the center by a huge steel-and-glass dome. The dome was never built but the Theme Building built in the central area became a focal point visible to people coming to the airport.

Each terminal originally had a common design: a satellite building out in the middle of the ramp, reached by tunnels from a separate ticketing building. Originally the tunnels were supposed to have moving walkways. Still, they were eliminated due to funding cuts. Instead, they received mosaics which came to be known as the LAX color tunnels, to make the 300–500-foot (91–152 m) walk feel shorter.

Terminals 7 and 8 (built for United Airlines) were the first to be completed on June 25, 1961, followed by Terminals 3 (Trans World Airlines), 4 (American Airlines), and 5 (Western Airlines) in September. Terminal 2 opened as the international terminal in December. Terminal 6, a "consolidated" terminal for other domestic carriers, was the last to open.

A significant airport expansion came in the early 1980s, ahead of the 1984 Summer Olympic Games. In November 1983 a second-level roadway was added, separating departing and arriving travelers; Terminal 1, which had been planned in the 1958 design, opened in January 1984; and the new Tom Bradley International Terminal opened in June 1984. Throughout the 1980s, the original terminals (2, 3, 4, 5, 6, and 7) were also rebuilt with connector buildings that transformed the separate satellite and ticketing buildings into one continuous terminal.

== Inter-terminal connections ==
While connections between some terminals had existed for years, by October 2023, as a result of the ongoing Landside Access Modernization Program (LAMP), passengers could walk through all the main terminals without needing to exit the secure area and be rescreened:

- A departures-level walkway connects Terminals 1, 2, and 3.
- Skybridges connect the Tom Bradley International Terminal (Terminal B) to Terminals 3 and 4.
- A tunnel connects the main Tom Bradley International Terminal (Terminal B) concourse to the West Gates.
- A tunnel connects Terminals 4, 5, and 6.
- A departures-level walkway connects Terminals 6, 7, and 8.

There are also airside shuttles connecting some of these terminals; for instance, some airlines have check-in counters and baggage claim at Terminal 1, but provide shuttle bus service to and from the distant Bradley West gates, where their planes arrive. The satellite regional terminal is only accessible by an airside shuttle bus that connects to Terminals 4 and 5.

== Terminal 1 ==
Terminal 1 has 14 gates: Gates 9, 11A, 11B, 12A, 12B, 13–16, 17A, 17B, 18A, 18B, and the bus gate. As of January 2026, this terminal is served by JetBlue and as an operating base for Southwest Airlines. The terminal also has check-in facilities for Allegiant Air, Breeze Airways, Cayman Airways, Frontier Airlines, Sun Country Airlines and Viva. After clearing security in Terminal 1, passengers for all airlines other than JetBlue and Southwest board a shuttle bus to the West Gates of the Tom Bradley International Terminal, where the flights operate.

Terminal 1 was built in 1984 for Pacific Southwest Airlines (PSA). The terminal was last extensively renovated in 2018, providing updates to the security screening area, terminal areas and baggage handling. The terminal was also expanded in 2021 to fill in the area between terminals 1 and 2, adding a post-security bridge between the terminals, and a bus gate to take passengers to boarding gates in the Tom Bradley International Terminal; this section of the terminal will provide a connection to SkyLink when it opens.

Former tenants of the terminal include Air California, Air Hawaii, AirTran Airways, America West Airlines, Braniff, Lynx Air, Morris Air, Pacific Southwest Airlines, Piedmont Airlines, StatesWest Airlines, TranStar Airlines, and US Airways.

== Terminal 2 ==
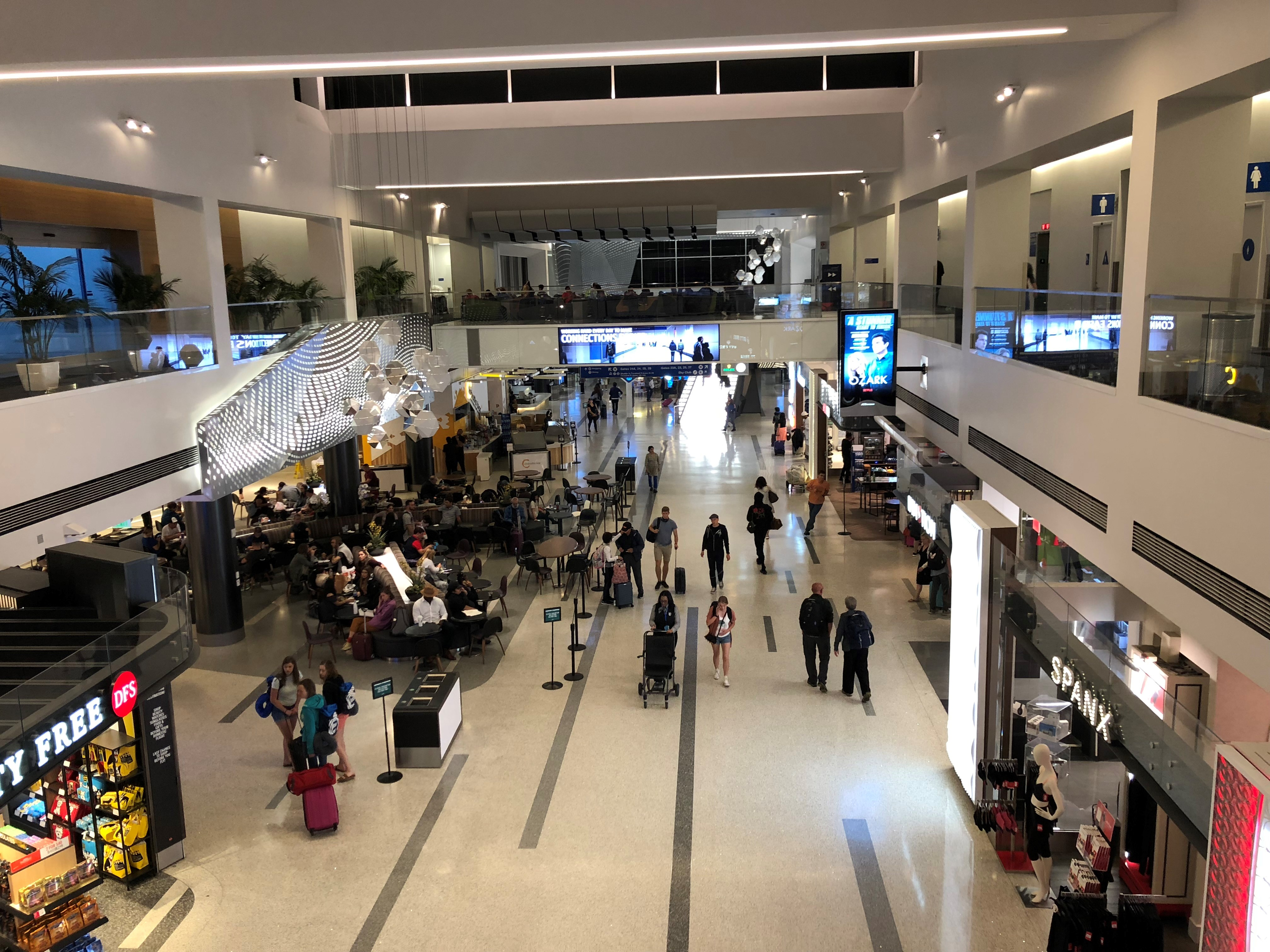
Terminal 2 concourse

Terminal 2 has 13 gates: Gates 20, 21, 21B, 22, 23A, 23B, 24, 25A, 25B, 26A, 26B, 27, and 28. As of July 2025, this terminal, along with Terminal 3, serves as a hub for Delta Air Lines, although the airline has no check-in facilities at this terminal. The terminal also has check-in facilities for Norse Atlantic Airways and WestJet. After clearing security, Norse passengers board a bus to the Tom Bradley International Terminal, while WestJet passengers walk to Terminal 3.

Terminal 2 was built in 1962 and was the original international terminal. It was completely torn down and rebuilt in stages between 1984 and 1988 at a cost of $94 million. The rebuilt terminal was designed by Leo A Daly. Terminal 2 has CBP (Customs and Border Protection) facilities to process arriving international passengers, but the facility was closed in 2020 and temporarily repurposed as a domestic bag claim area during construction of Terminal 3. As of February 2023, the CBP facility is being rebuilt.

Former tenants of the terminal include Aer Lingus, Air Canada, Air L.A., Air Mobility Command, Air New Zealand, Air Resorts, Líneas Aéreas Allegro, Asiana, ATA Airlines, Aviacsa, Avianca, Braniff International Airways, Caledonian Airways, Canadian Pacific Air Lines, CAAC Airlines, Capitol Air, Carnival Air Lines, Condor, Hawaiian Airlines, KLM, LTU International, MarkAir, Miami Air International, National Airlines (1934–1980), Northwest Airlines, Omni Air International, Pacific Express, Pan American Airways (Pan Am), People Express Airlines, Ports of Call, Ryan International Airlines, Skyservice Airlines, VASP, Virgin Atlantic, World Airways, and the majority of the International carriers before the Tom Bradley International Terminal opened.

A Delta Sky Club operates on the upper level of Terminal 2; space originally built for a second lounge is currently in use as offices.

== Terminal 3 ==
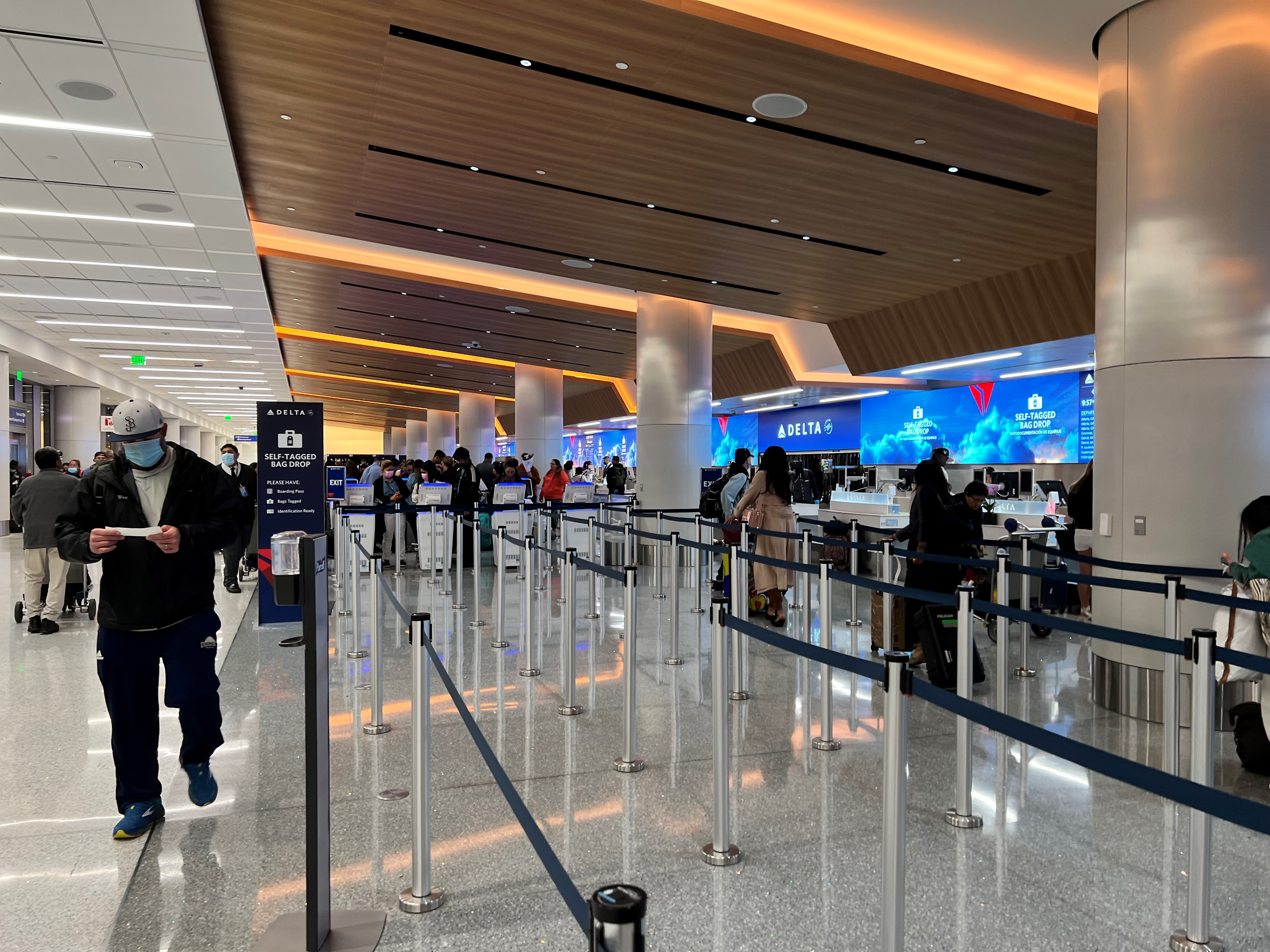
Terminal 3 check-in area

Terminal 3 has 15 gates: Gates 30A, 30B, 31A, 31B, 32A, 32B, 33, 34A, 34B, 35, 36, 37A, 37B, and 38. As of June 2022, this terminal, along with Terminal 2, serves as a hub for Delta Air Lines. The terminal also has check-in facilities for Delta's SkyTeam partners, Aeroméxico and Virgin Atlantic. After clearing security in Terminal 3, Aeroméxico and Virgin Atlantic passengers walk to the Tom Bradley International Terminal.

Terminal 3 opened in 1961 and was Trans World Airlines' (TWA) terminal. Eastern Air Lines initially also shared space as a tenant. The terminal was expanded in 1970 to accommodate widebody operations and between 1980 and 1987, which included a new passenger connector building and baggage system connected to the original satellite. It formerly housed some American Airlines flights after that airline acquired Reno Air and TWA in 1999 and 2001, respectively. Virgin America was also based here from 2008–2017 until the Alaska Airlines merger moved them to Terminal 6. US Airways was housed in Terminal 3 after renovations were started in Terminal 1 from February 2014 until eventually, all American flights were moved to Terminal 4.

Terminal 3 was closed, partially demolished and reconstructed between November 2020 and April 2022 as part of Delta Air Lines' $1.9 billion "Delta Sky Way at LAX" modernization project. The pace of construction was accelerated due to the decline in passenger air travel as the result of the global COVID-19 pandemic.

Former tenants of the terminal include Air California, AirTran Airways, American Airlines, ATA Airlines, Bonanza Air Lines, Braniff International Airways, Eastern Air Lines, Golden West Airlines, The Hawaii Express, Midway Airlines, Midwest Airlines, Northeastern International Airways, Pacific East Airlines, Pacific Express, Reno Air, Southwest Airlines, Spirit Airlines, Trans World Airlines, US Airways, Virgin America, Virgin Australia, and Western Pacific Airlines.

Terminal 3 has one Delta SkyClub located off the walkway between Terminal 2 and 3. The Delta One Lounge opened on October 8, 2024.

== Terminal 4 ==
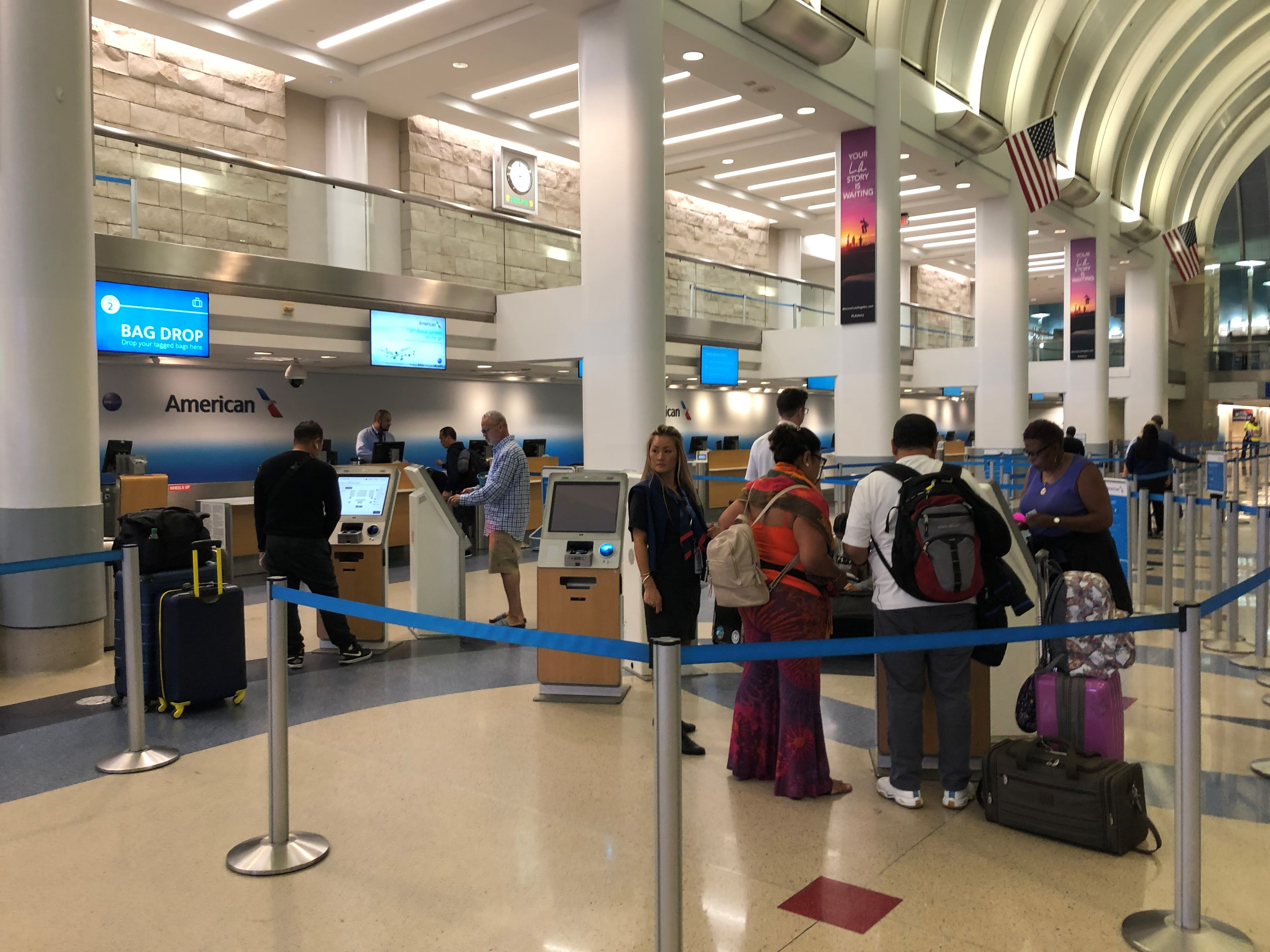
Terminal 4 check-in area

Terminal 4 has 16 gates: Gates 40, 41, 42A, 42B, 43–45, 46A, 46C, 47A, 47B, 48A, 48B, 49A, and 49B. As of June 2022, this terminal, the Regional Terminal, and part of Terminal 5, serve as a hub for American Airlines.

Terminal 4 was built in 1961, was expanded in 1983 by adding a connector from the ticketing areas to the original satellite, and was renovated in 2002 at the cost of $400 million in order to improve the appearance and functionality of the facility. The renovation was designed by Rivers & Christian. Some international departures operate at TBIT.

American Airlines and American Eagle have more gates than any other airline at LAX, with 28 (American Airlines operates from 32 gates in total, including 9 gates at the American Eagle satellite terminal, 4 dedicated gates at Terminal 5, as well as 4 rotating gates at Tom Bradley International Terminal).

American Airlines has two clubs in the terminal: one Admirals Club and one Flagship Lounge.

Former tenants of the terminal include: Air California, Alaska Airlines, America West Airlines, KLM, Midwest Airlines, Northwest Airlines, Piedmont Airlines, Pride Air, Reno Air, Sun Aire Lines, and Wings West Airlines.

== Terminal 5 ==
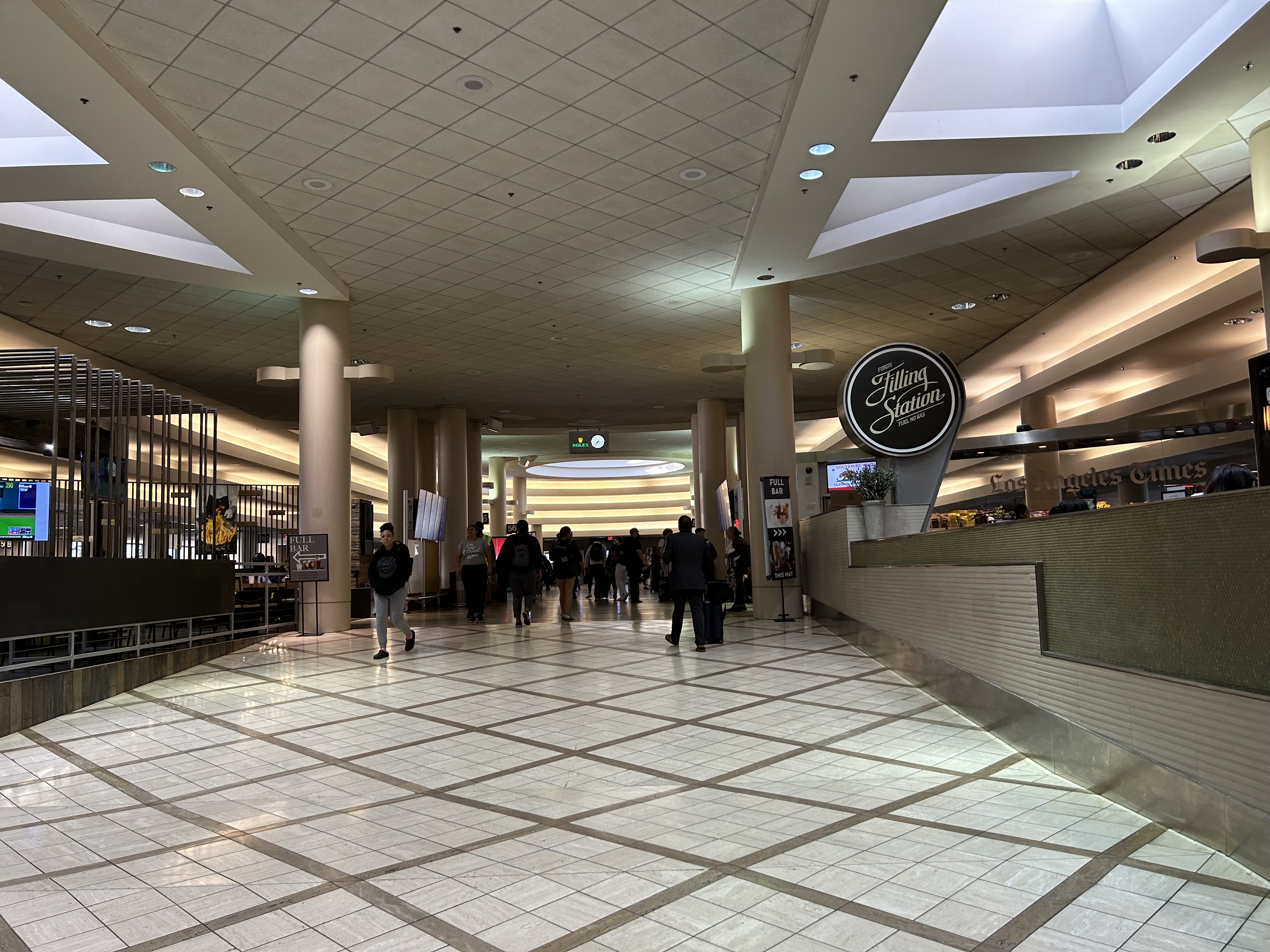
Interior of the former Terminal 5 in June 2023

Terminal 5 had 17 gates: Gates 50, 51A, 51B, 53A, 53B, 54A, 54B, 55A, 55B, 51A–51D, 57–59, and a bus gate. Gates 52A–52I are located at the Regional Terminal. As of March 2024, the terminal served as a hub for American Airlines along with Terminal 4 and the Regional Terminal.

Terminal 5 was closed for demolition and reconstruction with the last day of operation on Tuesday, October 28, 2025. JetBlue moved to Terminal 1 on Tuesday, October 21, 2025, Spirit Airlines moved to Terminal 2 on Wednesday, October 22, 2025, and American Airlines moved to Terminal 4 and TBIT on Tuesday, October 28, 2025.

Terminal 5 opened in 1962, and Western Airlines occupied this terminal until Western was merged with Delta on April 1, 1987. Terminal 5 was redesigned by Gensler, expanded to include a connector building between the original satellite and the ticketing facilities and remodeled from 1986 through early 1988. It was unofficially named 'Delta's Oasis at LAX' with the slogan 'Take Five at LAX' when construction was completed in the summer of 1988. Northwest Airlines moved all operations to Terminal 5 and Terminal 6 alongside Delta on June 30, 2009, as part of its merger with the airline.

Delta, which had been based for decades in Terminal 5 (with additional gates in Terminal 6), moved to Terminals 2 and 3 between May 12–17, 2017, in order to relieve overcrowding and provide better and easier transfers with its airline partners at Tom Bradley International Terminal.

American Eagle flights operate from a satellite terminal that is located just east of Terminal 8. This terminal is accessed from a bus gate in Terminal 5, and has nine gates that supplement American's mainline operation at Terminals 4 and 5.

Former tenants of the terminal include Aeromexico, Air Jamaica, Air Tahiti Nui, Allegiant, British Caledonian, China Southern, Delta, Ecuatoriana de Aviación, Frontier, Hawaiian, Mexicana, Northwest, SkyWest, Song, Spirit, Sun Country, Swissair, JetBlue, TriStar, and Western.

American Airlines had one Admirals Club in the terminal.

== Terminal 6 ==
Terminal 6 has 16 gates: Gates 60–63, 64A–64C, 65A–65C, 66, 67, 68A, 68B, 69A, and 69B. As of April 2025, the terminal serves as a hub for Alaska Airlines and Hawaiian Airlines and is also used by Air Canada, Porter Airlines, Southern Airways Express, and United Airlines.

The terminal opened as "Satellite 6" and "Ticketing Building 6" in November 1963 and marked the conclusion of the initial phase of passenger terminal construction at the airport. When it originally opened, it was a common use, multi-carrier terminal that supported the operations of Continental Airlines, Delta Air Lines, Pacific Air Lines and Pacific Southwest Airlines. The original building was capable of handling six planes at one time.

In the early 1970s, Continental and Delta built the "Satellite Extension" to expand Satellite 6, adding additional gates to the south end of the building and reconfiguring the existing structure to accommodate the new "jumbo jet," the Boeing 747. When the project was complete, Satellite 6 was able to simultaneously handle eight planes: two 747s, four wide-bodied tri-jets, and two smaller planes such as the Boeing 707 or 727. Four of these gates have two jetways, which can accommodate large aircraft.

In 1982, Continental sponsored the Connector project, which joined the Ticketing Building to the Satellite and the Satellite Extension, adding additional gates and facilities.

Prior to October 2014, United Airlines used the connector gates, supplementing its base at Terminal 7. Delta also leased some space from the Airport in Terminal 6, in addition to its base at Terminal 5. Most rotunda gates can feed arriving passengers into a sterile corridor that shunts them to Terminal 7's customs and immigration facility. On November 6, 2014, American Airlines moved US Airways flights from Terminal 3 into Terminal 6, taking 4 gates in the Connector Building. On January 31, 2017, American Airlines relocated these 4 gates to Terminal 5 as part of the larger LAX Terminal relocation program.

In April 2011, Alaska Airlines agreed to a deal with Los Angeles World Airports to renovate Terminal 6 and build an Alaska Lounge for first-class passengers. The airline moved its flights to Terminal 6 on March 20, 2012, and Spirit Airlines was relocated to Terminal 3.

In July 2021, construction began on another round of refurbishments to the terminal. On the customer-facing front, the gate areas, departure lounges, Border Protection, and TSA Security areas are being refurbished/upgraded, and new jet bridges will be installed. Additionally, a drive-through bus gate will be added to ease transfers to other terminals. On the operations front, the apron paving, fuel lines and other airfield infrastructure will be upgraded. As construction progresses, different areas of the terminal will be closed to passengers, starting with the three gates at the southeast end. Construction was finished in 2023.

There are two lounges in the terminal: an Air Canada Maple Leaf Lounge and an Alaska Airlines Lounge.

Former tenants of the terminal include American Airlines, Continental Airlines, Copa Airlines, Delta Air Lines, Eastern Air Lines, Frontier Airlines, Great Lakes Airlines, Hughes Airwest, Lufthansa, National Airlines, Pacific Air Lines, Pacific Southwest Airlines, Republic Airlines, SkyWest Airlines, Swift Aire Lines, Ted, Wardair, Virgin America, VivaAerobus, and US Airways.

== Terminal 7 ==
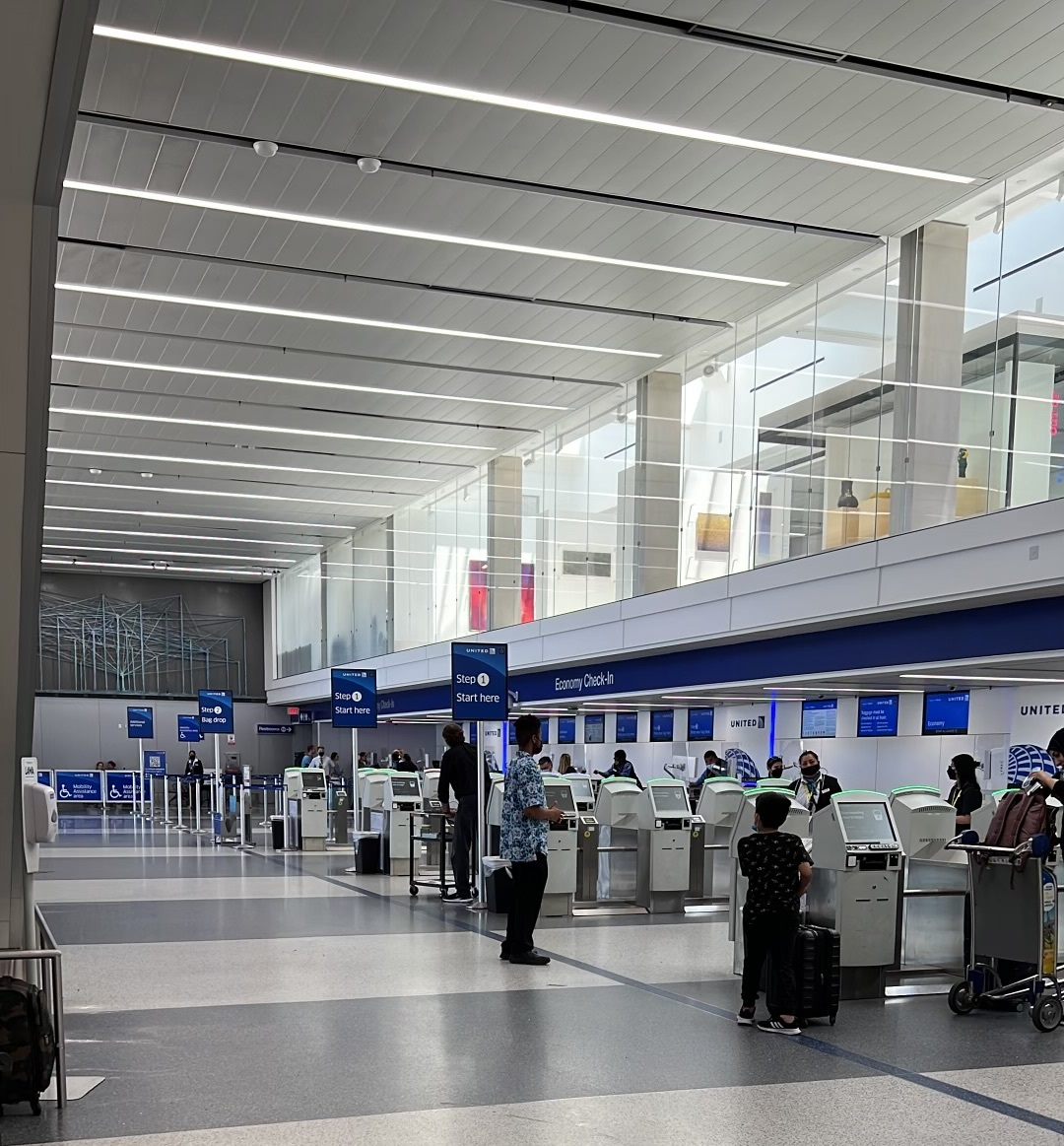
Terminal 7/8 check-in area

Terminal 7 has 13 gates: Gates 70A, 70B, 71A, 71B, 72A, 72B, 73, 74, 75A, 75B, 76A, 76B, and 77. As of June 2022, this terminal, along with Terminal 8, serves as a hub for United Airlines.

The terminal opened in 1962 and was expanded to accommodate widebody aircraft in 1970. The terminal was expanded in 1982 with the addition of a connector building, which today consists of gates 70A-70B and 71A-71B. Four of these gates have two jetways, which accommodate large aircraft. The interior of the terminal was renovated between January 1998 and June 1999 at a cost of $250 million, was designed by HNTB, and was constructed by Hensel Phelps Construction. Added were new gate podiums, increased size of gate areas, relocated concessions, expanded restrooms, new flooring, and new signage. Also, the roof of the terminal was raised, and new, brighter light fixtures were added in order to provide more overall lighting. In 2017, Terminal 7 underwent another renovation, with significant changes to concessions.

The terminal has two lounges—United Club and United Polaris—and a customs area on the arrivals floor, used by international United flights and Alaska Airlines flights in adjacent Terminal 6. Not all United and Alaska international arrivals are handled at Terminal 7's FIS (Federal Inspection Station). The table below shows some UA and AS international arrivals that are cleared at TBIT.

United and Alaska International Arrivals that Clear Immigration and Customs at TBIT
Airlines	Flight Number	Origin	Scheduled Arrival	Note
United	UA 99	Melbourne-Tullamarine (MEL)	6:40 am	
United	UA 842	Sydney-Kingsford Smith (SYD)	6:10 am	
United	UA 772	Beijing-Capital (PEK)	8:50 am	
United	UA 153	Hong Kong (HKG)	8:05 am 9:05 am	From late-March to late-October, UA 153 is scheduled to arrive in Terminal 7.
Alaska	AS 1324	Cancún (CUN)	8:56 pm	
Alaska	AS 1351	San José (SJO)	6:33 am	

Former tenants of the terminal include: Aspen Airways, Braniff, Imperial Airlines, Independence Air, Leisure Air, Los Angeles Airways, Texas International Airlines, Shuttle by United, Ted, and Virgin Atlantic.

== Terminal 8 ==
Terminal 8 has eight gates: Gates 80–85, 86A, and 86B. As of June 2022, the terminal, along with Terminal 7 serves as a hub for United Airlines.

Terminal 8 was originally called Concourse 8 or Satellite 8 because it does not have its own passenger processing facilities (ticketing, security checkpoint or baggage claim) and relies on the facilities located in Terminal 7. The building was redeveloped in 1982, ahead of the 1984 Olympics.

== Tom Bradley International Terminal (Terminal B) ==
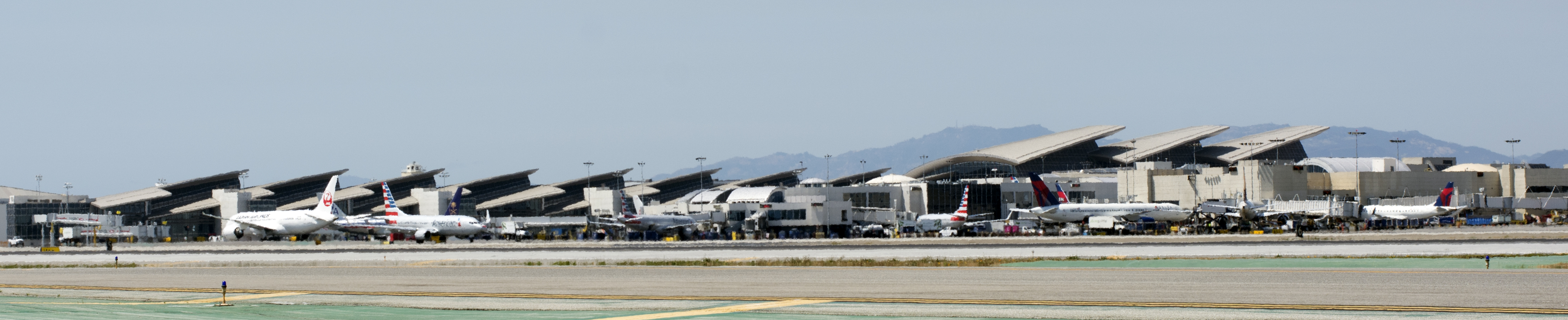
Wide view of Tom Bradley International Terminal (Terminal B)

Tom Bradley International Terminal 2026

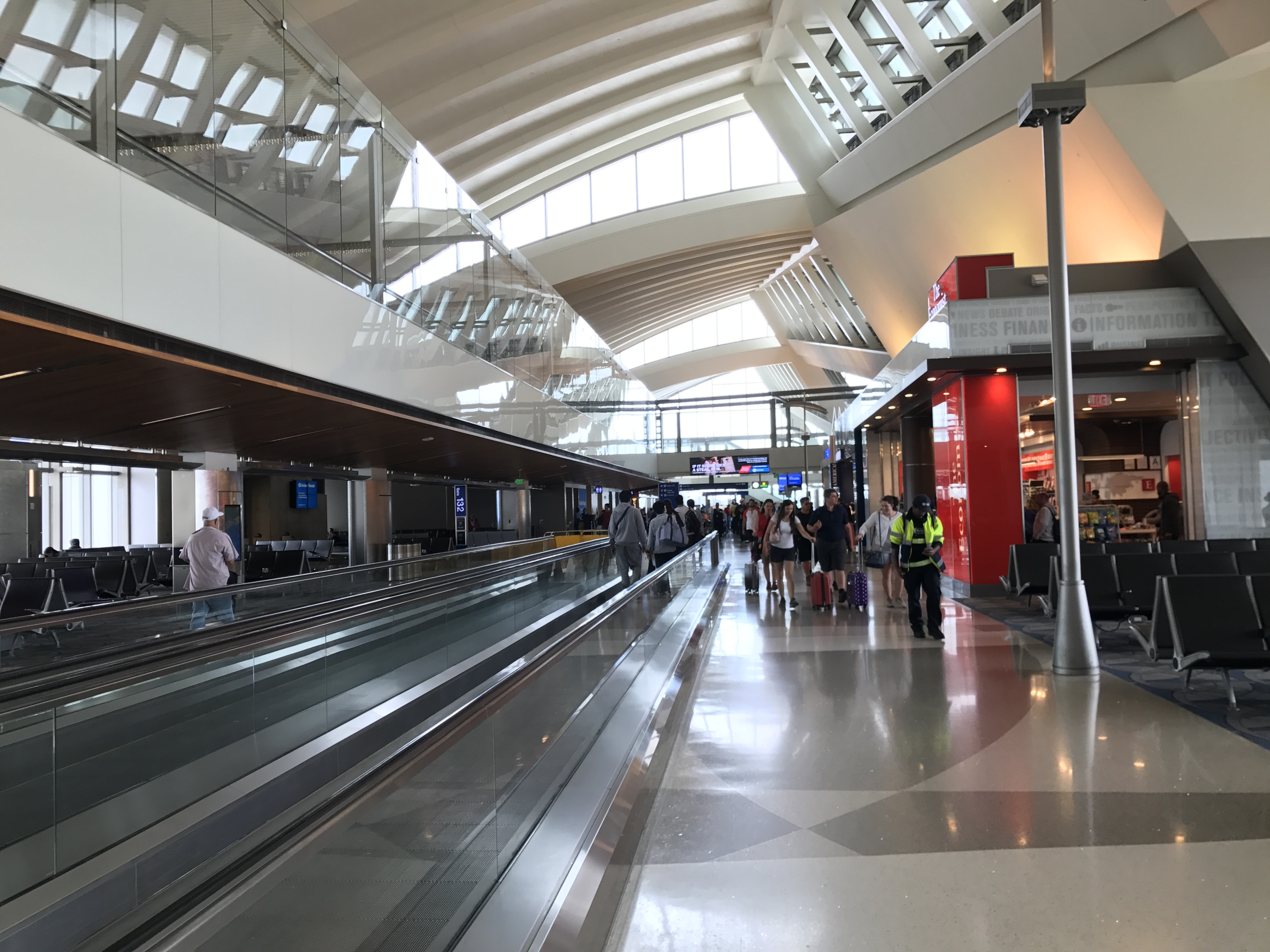
Moving walkways inside the new south concourse of the Tom Bradley West Gates. The separated arrivals walkway on the second floor leads directly to U.S. Customs

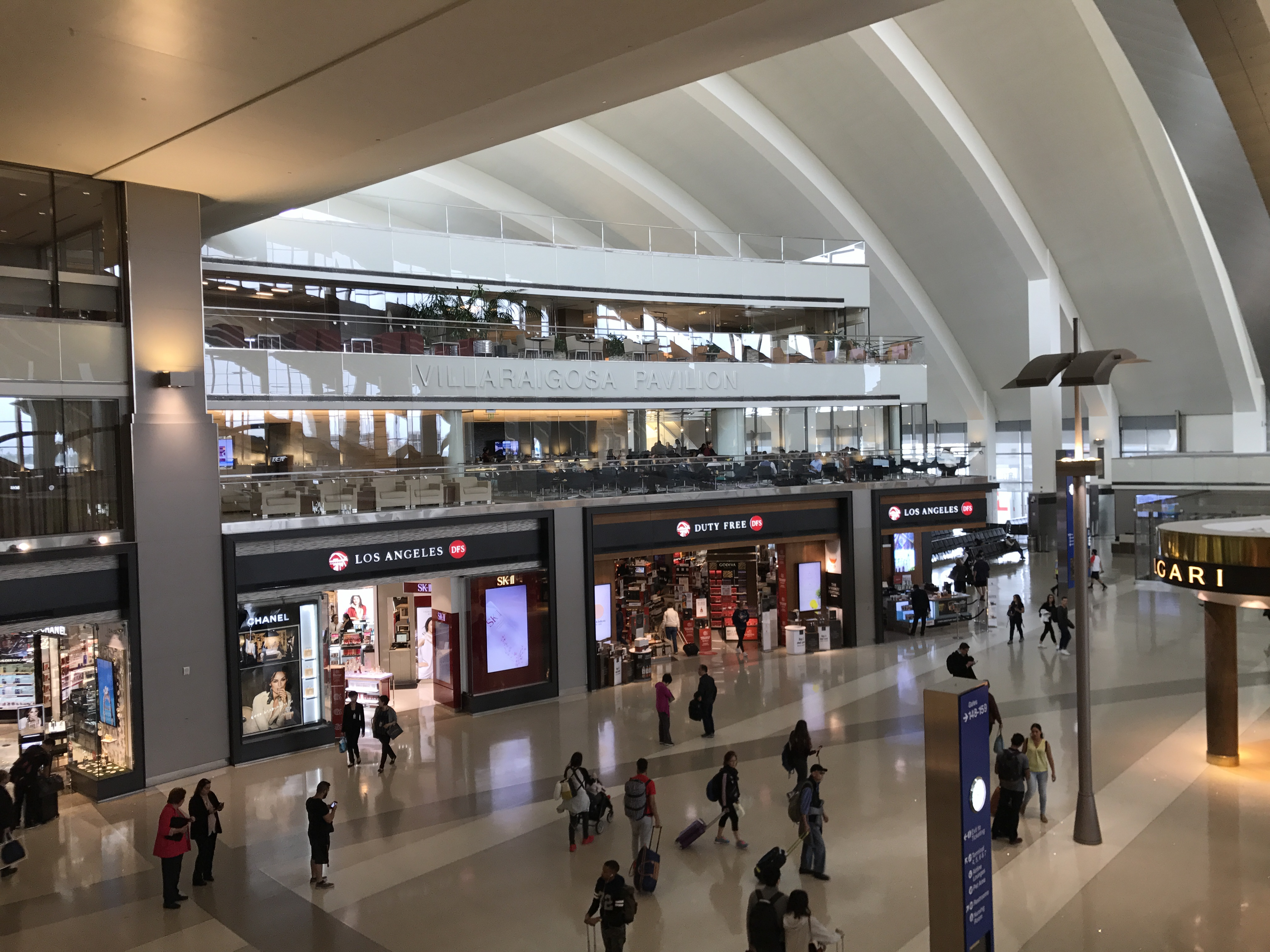
Terminal B main concourse

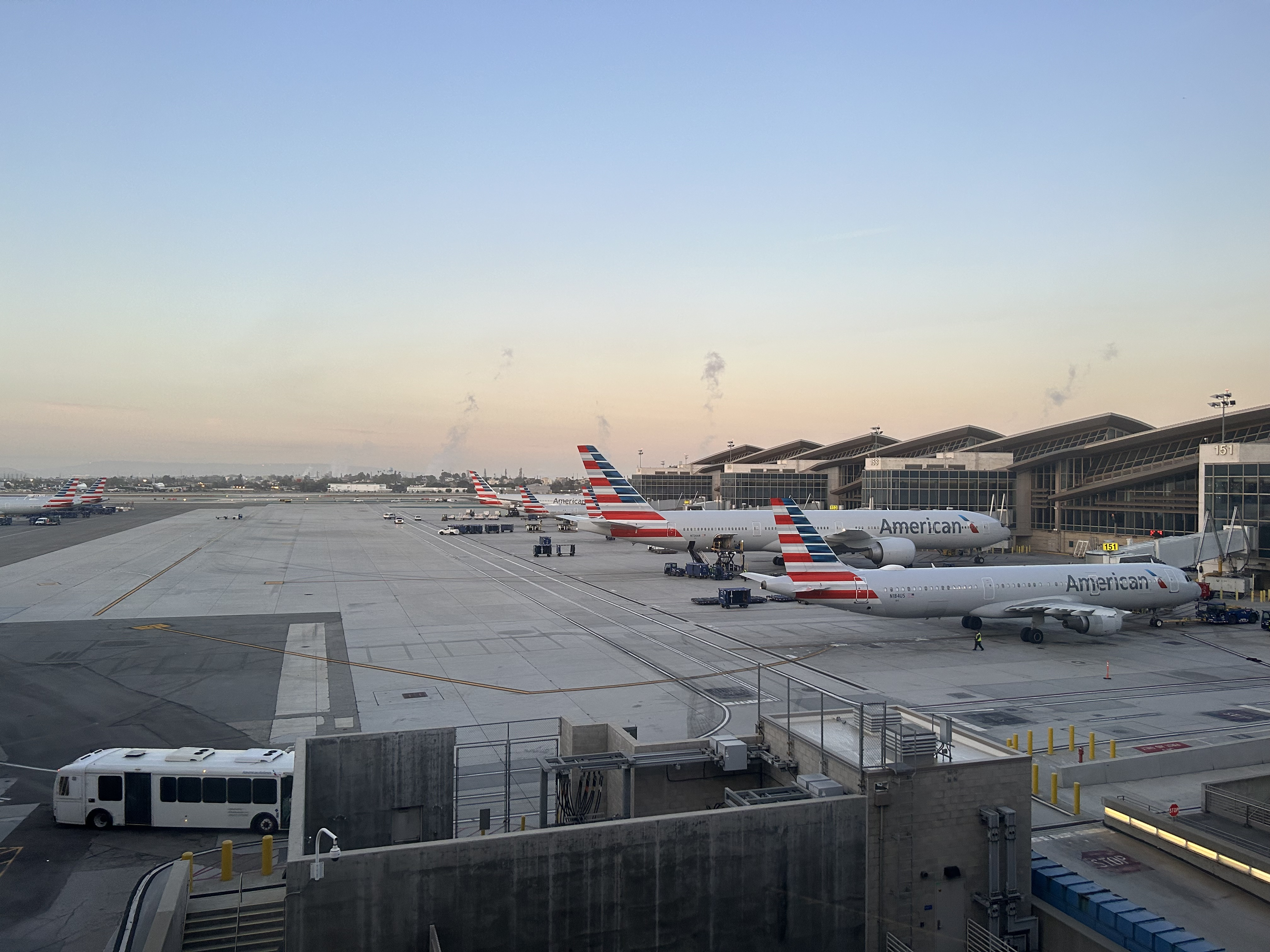
American Airlines jets parked at Terminal B during sunrise

The Tom Bradley International Terminal (TBIT), also referred as "'Terminal B'", has 40 gates: Gates 130–225. The terminal hosts more than 45 airlines, primarily foreign carriers.

The massive terminal is separated into five different areas:

- North Concourse (9 gates: 130–135, 137, 139, 141)
- South Concourse (10 gates: 148, 150–157, 159)
- West Gates (23 gates)
- Bus Gates (6 gates: 136, 138, 140, 142, 144, 146)
- Bus Port

The Bus Gates, located off the North Concourse, are used to shuttle passengers between Terminal B and nine satellite gates located on the west side of the LAX airfield. The Bus Port, located at the West Gates, is used to shuttle passengers from the remote check-in areas at other terminals to Terminal B.

The main Tom Bradley International Terminal has nine lounges. Three are operated by the major airline alliances (Oneworld, SkyTeam and Star Alliance), while the rest are operated by American Express, Emirates, Etihad Airways, Korean Air and Qantas, alongside the independent "Los Angeles International Lounge." The West Gates building has space for lounges not yet in use.

=== History ===
Known as the "West Side Terminal" during construction until its renaming after completion, Tom Bradley International Terminal opened on June 18, 1984, just weeks before the start of the 1984 Summer Olympic Games. It is named in honor of Tom Bradley, the first black and longest-serving (20 years) mayor of Los Angeles, and a champion of LAX.

The building was added to the west end of the passenger terminal area between Terminals 3 and 4. Prior to this, Terminal 2 was the primary international terminal.

By the early 2000s, airport managers grew concerned about LAX's future as an international gateway. The international terminal was aging, and many carriers had reduced flights to LAX in favor of more modern airports, such as San Francisco and Seattle/Tacoma. By 2007, LAX lost 12% of the seats on its weekly international departures. At the same time, the airport was concerned that it would not be able to accommodate future larger commercial aircraft, the Airbus A380 and Boeing 747-8.

Airport management gave the old terminal a minor facelift in September 2006, adding new paging, air conditioning and electrical systems, along with new elevators, escalators and baggage carousels. Meanwhile, the southern-most runway, 7R/25L was shifted 55 feet (17 m) to the south to prepare it for the additional width of the Airbus A380 and add a parallel taxiway between the adjacent runway. Runway 7R/25L reopened on March 25, 2007, and the taxiway was completed in 2008.

On March 19, 2007, the Airbus A380 made its US debut with simultaneous landings at LAX and John F. Kennedy International Airport in New York City. Commercial service with the Airbus A380 started on October 20, 2008, with Qantas service between LAX and Sydney. Because the original Bradley Terminal was too small to accommodate the jet, the plane was serviced using the satellite gates located on the west side of the LAX airfield.

The Bradley Terminal was heavily modernized and expanded in phases between 2008 and 2021.

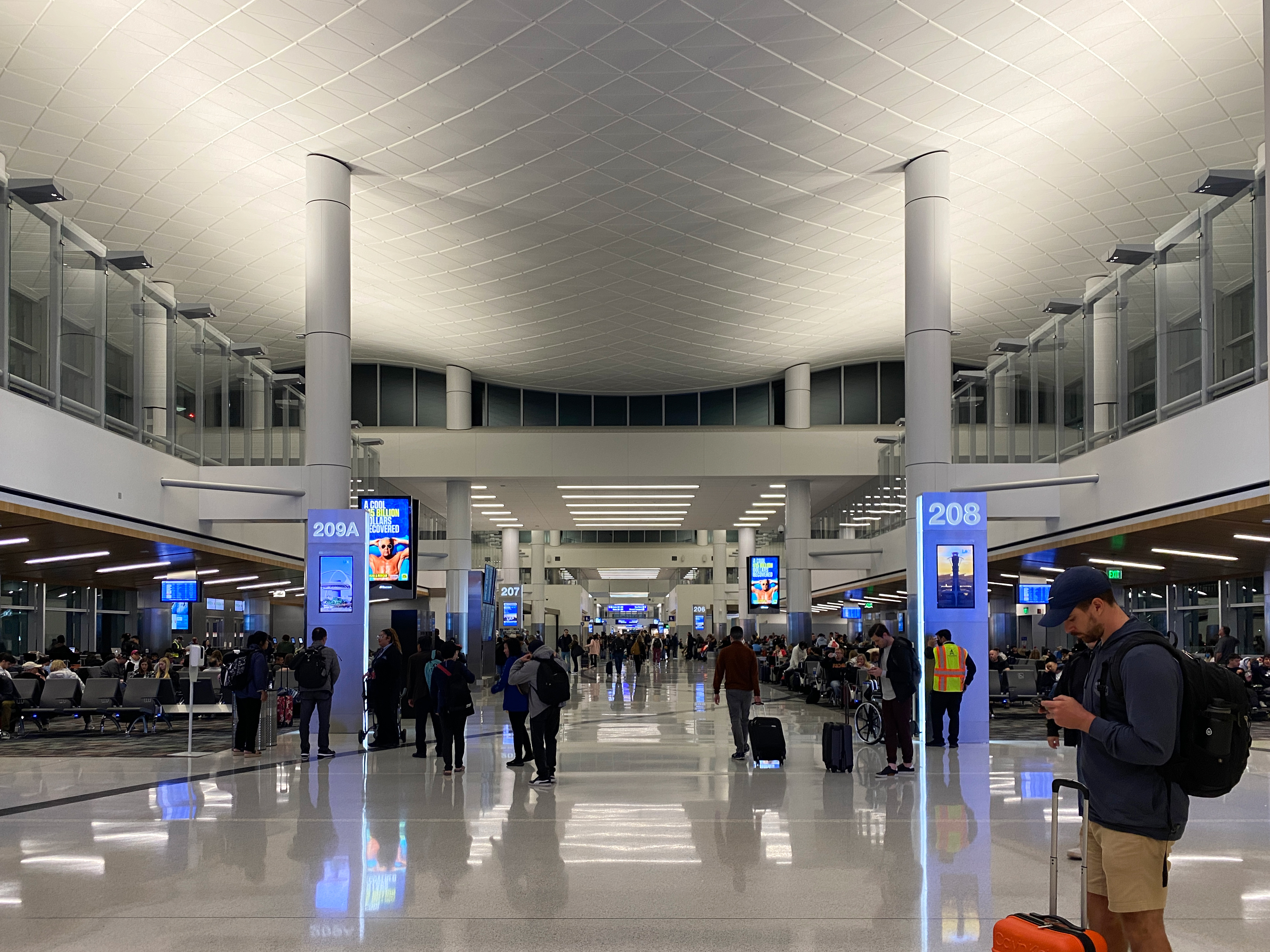
Interior view of the West Gates building

The design by Fentress Architects in association with HNTB was unveiled on November 17, 2008. The first phase of construction began on February 22, 2010, and included the demolition and replacement of the north concourse gates and the construction of the "Great Hall" with dining, retail shopping and large airline alliance lounges. Work on the first phase was completed in 2013 and crews began the second phase, which included the replacement of the south concourse and the expansion of the security, customs and immigration processing areas. The second phase was completed in 2015. Of the 19 gates in the modernized terminal, 9 are equipped with three jetbridges to accommodate the largest commercial aircraft, the Airbus A380 and Boeing 747-8.

The third phase was a new mid-field concourse that began construction on February 27, 2017. The concourse, later named the West Gates at Tom Bradley International, opened on May 1, 2021. A southern extension, referred to as the "Midfield Satellite Concourse (MSC) South," bringing in 8 additional gates, broke ground in 2023, completed in 2025, and was opened to the public on October 24 of that year. Two of the gates in the West Gates concourse can accommodate the A380.

Renovations for the check-in area and the arrivals hall began in January 2026.

== Regional Terminal ==
The Regional Terminal has nine gates: Gates 52A–52I, although Gate 52B is a bus gate. The terminal is used exclusively for American Eagle flights, earning it the nickname "the Eagle's nest." It serves as the remainder of American's hub operations in Los Angeles, supplementing Terminal 4 and 5.

The terminal is located on the southeast side of the LAX airfield, east of Sepulveda Boulevard from Terminal 8. As it is physically separated from the other terminal buildings, passengers access the Regional Terminal using a system of shuttle buses. Buses operate between the Regional Terminal and Terminal 4 or Terminal 5, which house American Airlines' other gates.

The Regional Terminal's gate numbers (52A–52I) are meant to encourage passengers originating their travel from LAX to enter the airport through the less congested Terminal 5 and board the bus at a stop located at Gate 52. But as the majority of American Airlines' mainline fights at LAX operate out of Terminal 4, a separate bus service is additionally operated to that terminal to minimize connection times.

The terminal has a covered walkway and ramp at each gate for access and egress to the aircraft instead of jet bridges. The terminal features restrooms, seating areas with power outlets, and a concession area.

American Airlines has one Admirals Club in the terminal.

The terminal originally handled United Express flights (gates 71C-71K) until it was vacated in 2005. American Eagle flights were relocated to the terminal in January 2010 from a remote terminal which was 0.3 miles (480 m) west of Terminal 4 that would later be demolished.

== SkyLink ==
As part of the Landside Access Modernization Program (LAMP), Los Angeles World Airports (LAWA) is building SkyLink, which consists of approximately 2.25 miles (3.62 km) of elevated guideway and six stations. Headways are expected to be as low as two minutes between trains. Construction started in 2017. A 60 day period of testing began in April 2026 to obtain approval to begin passenger service.

The three westernmost stations are within the Central Terminal Area (CTA) located above the parking structures and connect to the terminals via pedestrian bridges:

- West CTA station, serving terminals 3, 4, and B (the Tom Bradley International Terminal)
- Center CTA station, serving terminals 1, 2, 5, and 6
- East CTA station, serving terminals 7 and 8

SkyLink connects the CTA to transportation options:

- LAX West Intermodal Transportation Facility, an economy parking structure with access to the LAX City Bus Center and nearby hotels
- LAX/Metro Transit Center (also known as the ITF East), connecting to the Los Angeles Metro Rail system
- LAX Rental Car Center, which houses 21,000 rental vehicles for all of the major rental car companies that operate at LAX

== Proposed terminal renaming ==
In 2024, LAWA launched a plan to improve wayfinding at the airport in anticipation of the opening of the People Mover and the flood of visitors expected for the 2028 Summer Olympics. This plan includes a proposed renaming of existing and planned terminals, and renumbering of gates:

- The new concourse planned for construction to the east of Terminal 1, generally referred to as Concourse 0 during planning, will be part of Terminal 1. The Concourse 0 gates would become the A Gates, with their gate numbers prefixed with the letter A, while the existing Terminal 1 gates would become the B Gates.
- The existing Terminals 2 and 3, already combined in many ways by the major renovations completed in 2022, would be rebranded as Terminal 2. The old Terminal 2 gates would become the C Gates, while the old Terminal 3 gates would become the D Gates.
- Tom Bradley International Terminal B would be rebranded as Tom Bradley Terminal 3. The original Bradley terminal gates would become the E Gates, while the existing and planned midfield West Gates would become the F Gates.
- Terminals 4, 5, and 6 would retain their current numbers, though their gates would become the G, H, and J Gates, respectively.
- The existing Terminals 7 and 8 would be rebranded as a single Terminal 7. Existing Terminal 7 gates would become the K Gates, while existing Terminal 8 gates would become the L Gates.
- The new terminal planned for construction to the east of the current Terminal 8, generally referred to as Terminal 9 during planning, would take on the Terminal 8 name, with its gates being called the M Gates.

These proposed changes were part of a proposal to the LAWA board. A spokesperson for the agency said that a final decision on numbering had not yet been made as of 2024.
