= Shuttle by United =

Low-cost airline of the United States (1994–2001)

IATA	ICAO	Call sign
UA	UAL	UNITED
- Commenced operations: 1994
- Ceased operations: 2001 (re-integrated into United Airlines)
- Hubs: Los Angeles; San Francisco
- Frequent-flyer program: MileagePlus
- Alliance: Star Alliance (affiliate, 1997–2001)
- Destinations: See Destinations below
- Parent company: United Airlines

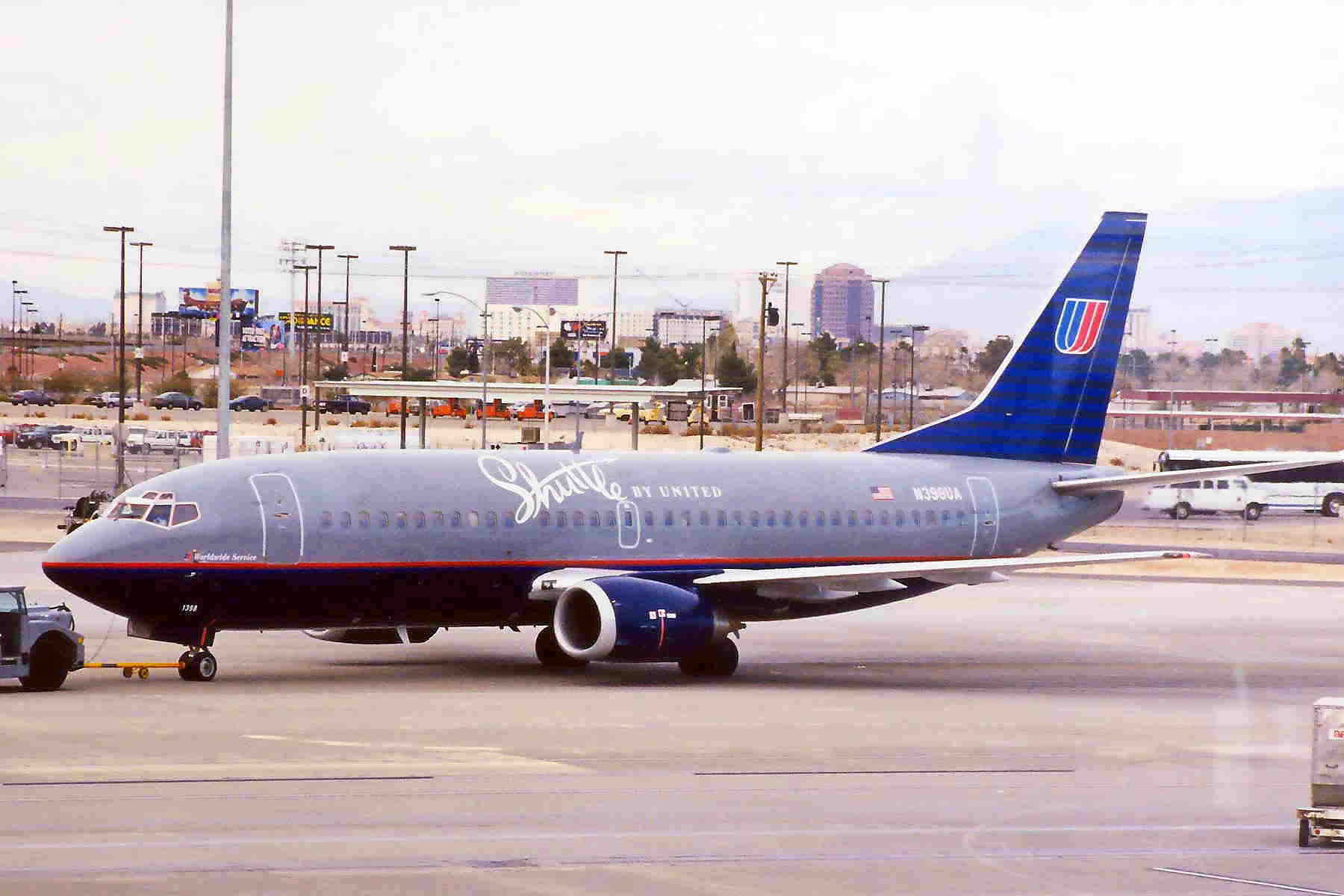
Shuttle by United Boeing 737-300 at Las Vegas in 1999

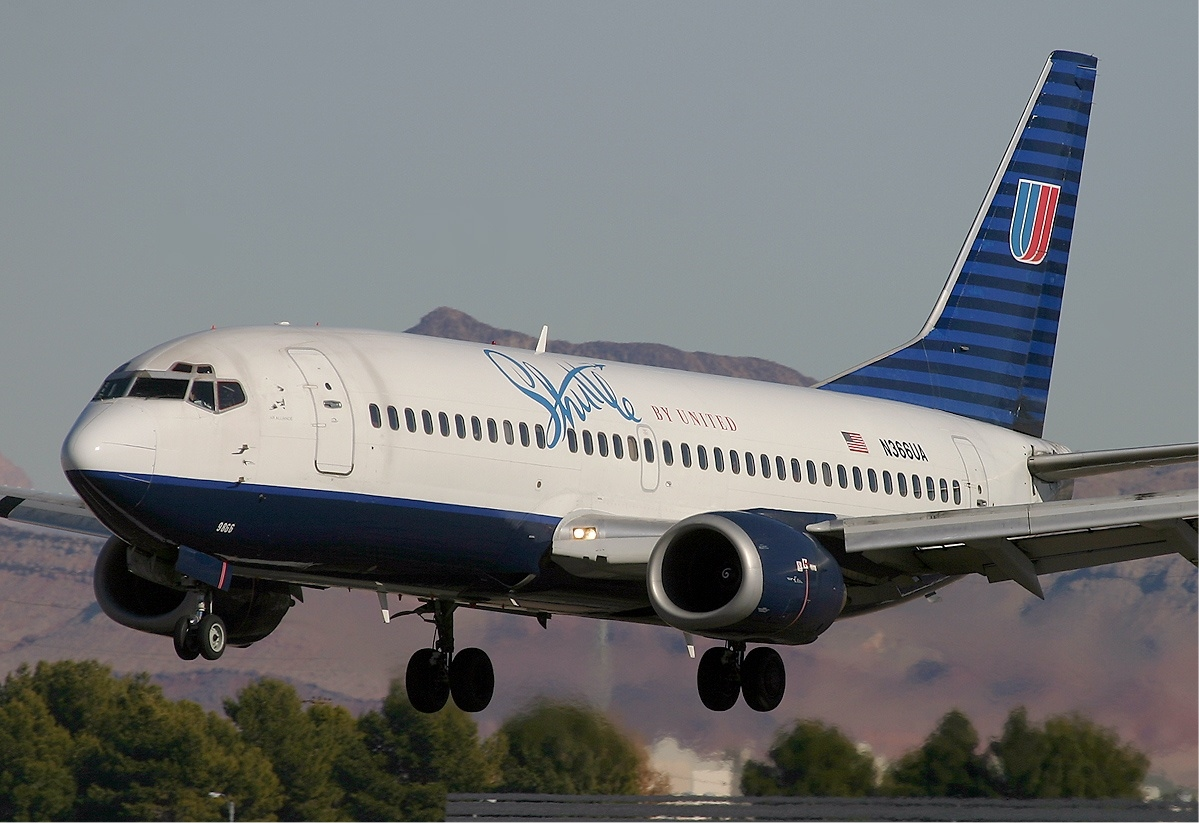
Former Shuttle by United Boeing 737-300 in 2003

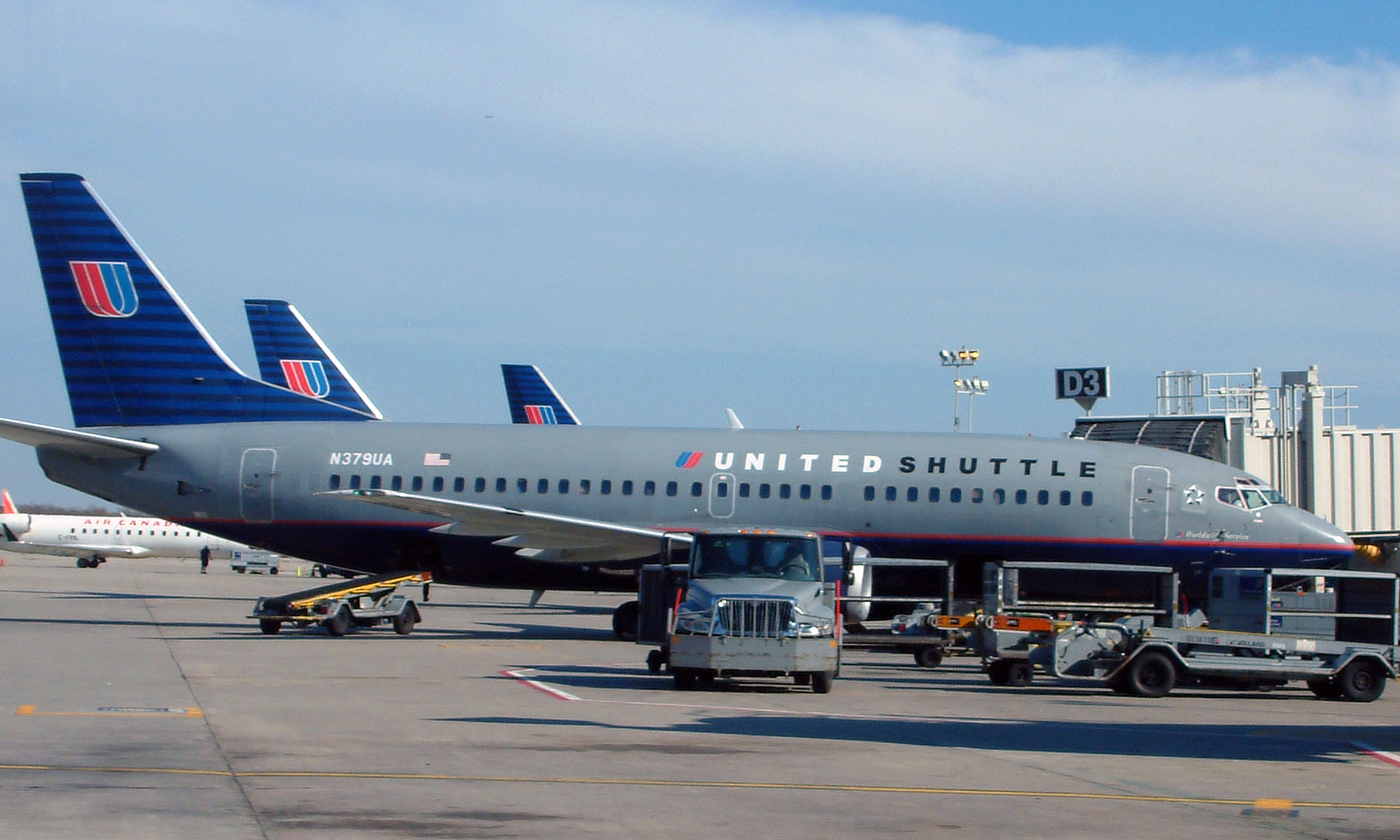
United Airlines Boeing 737-300 in United Shuttle colors at Philadelphia International Airport (2005)

Shuttle by United was an "airline within an airline" operated as a subsidiary of United Airlines from 1994 to 2001 along the West Coast of the United States. It operated from San Francisco International Airport and Los Angeles International Airport. Shuttle's fleet consisted of Boeing 737-300s and 737-500s. The service was eventually renamed United Shuttle before it was shut down by United and its aircraft returned to mainline service with the airline.

== Operations ==
The recession of the early 1990s and the expansion of low-cost carriers and other effects of deregulation pressured the major airlines to reduce costs and fares. In July 1994, United Airlines concluded an ESOP agreement with its pilot (ALPA) and machinists (IAM) unions whereby employees would take ownership of 55% of the airline in exchange for reduced wages (US$4.88 billion reduction for 5.5 years) and benefits for new employees. Disliked CEO Stephen Wolf was summarily removed (with a US$75 million severance package) and a new management team, Jerry Greenwald and John Edwardson took the reins at United. The new "Team" began a spending spree. In their first year, they replaced all of United's ground equipment, eating up nearly all of the United's ESOP tax advantage for 1994–1995. Feeling financially flush, management moved to organize the lowest scales into a new "airline within an airline" dubbed "U-2".

"U-2" designed to replicate some of the cost and operational advantages of regional competitors such as Southwest Airlines. All 58 of its aircraft were of a single type, the Boeing 737. Hot meals were eliminated, aircraft turn-around times were reduced to less than 20 minutes and OAK replaced SFO as "U-2's" new hub. The fare structure was reduced and simplified to lure passengers, with revenue stabilized by increasing frequency of service, over time, United was able to regain 80% of its market share that it had lost to Southwest.

At the same time, "U-2" would remain legally part of United Airlines, with access to its Apollo Computer Reservation System. In the beginning, "U-2" experimented with un-assigned seating (window-middle-aisle boarding). Not until near the end of the "U-2" did passengers again enjoy preassigned seating, could transfer seamlessly to and from "mainline" service, and accumulate miles in United's MileagePlus frequent flyer program. In this respect, it resembled competitors' first generation "airline within an airline" divisions such as Continental Lite, Delta Express, and US Airways' MetroJet.

Development and testing for "U-2", began in May 1993 at United's Headquarters in Chicago, IL. On October 1, 1994, the first "Shuttle by United" flight departed out of SFO to LAX. SFO Fire Trucks created a "water-arch" for the aircraft to taxi through. Using Oakland, CA as their new hub, United's, "Shuttle by United" offered flights to Los Angeles, Burbank and Ontario for as little as $19 one-way. Within nearly three years it had expanded to 20 cities and comprised 5% of United's total capacity. In February 1996, Rono Dutta, United's Senior Vice President of Planning, decided to return its successful "Shuttle by United" to a "hub and spoke" feeder to United's Domestic and International flights which departed primarily from LAX and SFO on the West Coast. It didn't take long for the Shuttle's schedule and reputation to collapse. SFO replaced OAK as the Shuttle's hub. Unlike OAK, when inclement weather hit SFO, arrival traffic was cut in half. This decision alone by Rono Dutta, became the straw that broke the Shuttle's back. Profits tumbled, in 1995, United lost $47 million on $3.22 billion in revenue. In 1999, United established a second base in Terminal 8 of Los Angeles International Airport, United's newest hub, by which time it also served as a feeder operation for United's transcontinental and international services. In the late 1999 its name was changed to United Shuttle. United slowly converted the "Shuttle" to a hub and spoke feeder airline for its mainline and international flights. Rescheduling Shuttle flights to meld with mainline and international flights was the demise of the Shuttle. Prices started increasing and quick turnarounds disappeared.

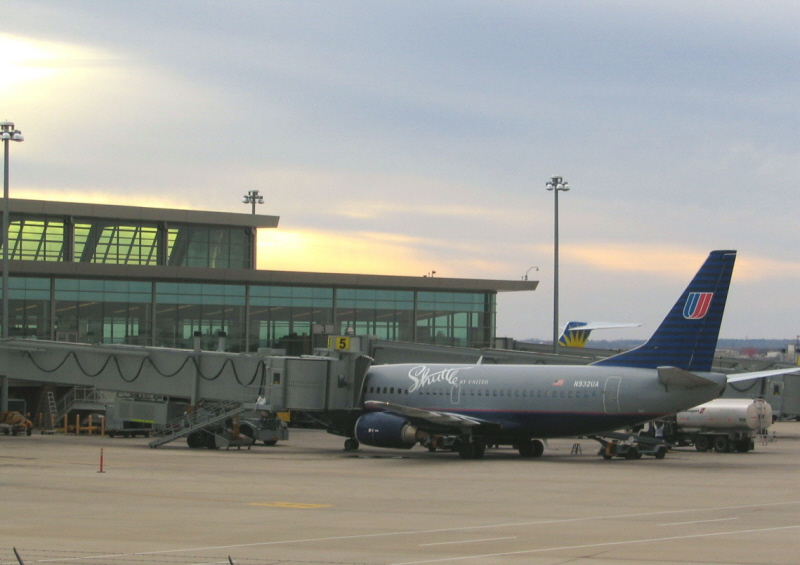
A United Shuttle Boeing 737-500 at Will Rogers World Airport

With demand for travel to the San Francisco Bay Area heavy during the Dot-com bubble, Shuttle was profitable and United regained 80% of the market share that they had lost to Southwest Airlines in the early 1990s. Rono Dutta's decision to return the Shuttle to a hub feeder airline meant the demise of the Shuttle. Cloud cover at SFO reduced arrival traffic by 50%. These frequent delays, exacerbated by Shuttle's high frequency schedule and less than adequate staffing, meant the eventual demise of the Shuttle. In 2000 two out of three flights between SFO and LAX were delayed or canceled.

When air travel declined following the September 11 attacks in 2001 it became evident that cost savings had not materialized to justify the Shuttle, it was folded back into the mainline United operation and in 2007, its Boeing 737 aircraft were eventually repainted.

In December 2002 United declared bankruptcy and hinted at a revival of the Shuttle. Instead it created a leisure destination carrier called Ted, part of a second generation of "airline within an airline" services along with Delta Air Lines' Song and Air Canada Tango. Ted ceased operations in early 2009 and its fleet was folded back into United's.

== Destinations ==
Shuttle by United and United Shuttle served the following destinations during the 1990s:

- Burbank, California - Burbank-Glendale-Pasadena Airport
- Denver, Colorado - Denver International
- Las Vegas, Nevada - McCarran International Airport
- Los Angeles, California - Los Angeles International Airport
- Oakland, California - Oakland International Airport
- Ontario, California - LA/Ontario International Airport
- Phoenix, Arizona - Phoenix Sky Harbor International Airport
- Sacramento, California - Sacramento International Airport
- San Diego, California - San Diego International Airport
- San Francisco, California - San Francisco International Airport
- Santa Barbara, California - Santa Barbara Municipal Airport
- Seattle, Washington - Seattle-Tacoma International Airport

== Fleet ==
- Boeing 737-300
- Boeing 737-500

== See also ==
- Delta Express, a low-cost subsidiary of Delta from 1996 until 2003 that preceded Song
- Virgin America, a 2007-2018 low-cost airline that was dominant in the West Coast, then merged with legacy carrier Alaska
- List of defunct airlines of the United States
