= Ted (airline) =

Low-cost airline of the United States (2003–2009)

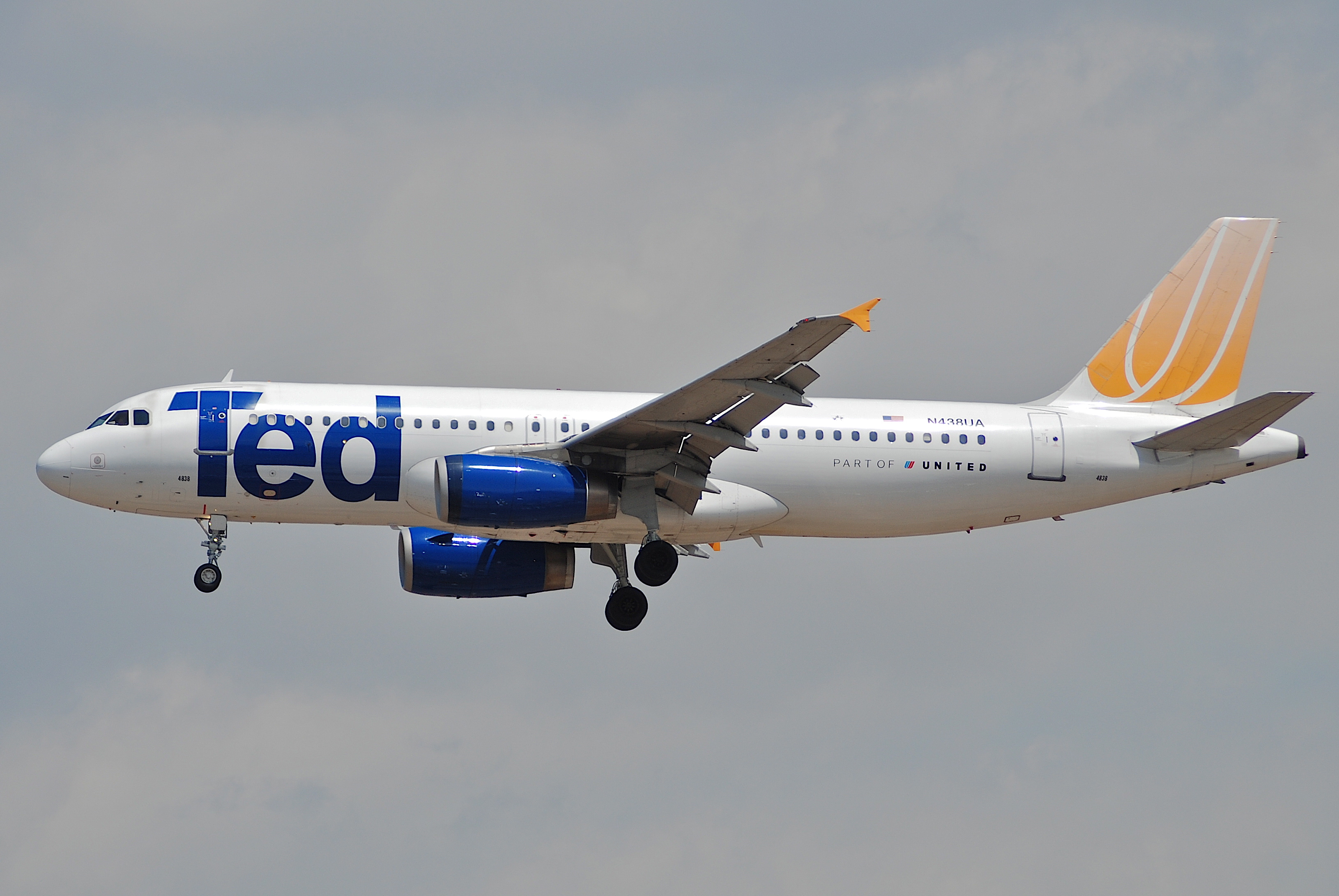
- A Ted Airbus A320-200 (N438UA) landing at Los Angeles International Airport on April 21, 2007
IATA	ICAO	Call sign
UA	UAL	UNITED
- Founded: November 12, 2003
- Commenced operations: February 12, 2004
- Ceased operations: January 6, 2009 (re-integrated into United Airlines)
- Hubs: Denver
- Secondary hubs: Chicago–O'Hare; Los Angeles; San Francisco; Washington–Dulles
- Frequent-flyer program: Mileage Plus
- Alliance: Star Alliance (affiliate, 2003–2009)
- Fleet size: 56
- Destinations: 23
- Parent company: United Airlines
- Headquarters: Denver, Colorado, U.S.
- Key people: Glenn Tilton (CEO)
- Website: www.flyted.com

Ted was one of two airline divisional brands of United Airlines. It targeted vacation locations primarily served by the low cost airline market, in contrast to the company's high-end premium transcontinental brand, United p.s. (which focused on business travelers between United's two California hubs and New York City). "Ted" comes from the last three letters in the United brand name. United marketed Ted anthropomorphically and attempted to personify Ted; it used phrases such as Meet Ted or I've Met Ted.

Due to the airline crisis caused by spiking fuel prices, on June 4, 2008, United announced that the Ted brand and services would be discontinued. The Ted aircraft were refitted with a First Class cabin and re-incorporated into United's mainline fleet to compensate for the retirement of United's entire Boeing 737 fleet. Operations were folded back into the mainline brand on January 6, 2009.

== History ==
Ted's creation was announced November 12, 2003, and service began February 12, 2004. It began service out of United's hub in Denver International Airport to compete with JetBlue Airways. The airline had 56 Airbus A320-200s with 156 all-economy seats, allowing United to compete with low-cost airlines such as Frontier Airlines. All Ted flights were operated by United crews flying under the UAL operating certificate, as Ted was not actually a certificated airline, but rather a brand name applied to differentiate the all-economy service from United's mainline flights. Therefore, because of operational needs, it was possible for Ted aircraft to be utilized for mainline United flights; in the reverse, more often mainline United aircraft operated as Ted flights because of equipment substitutions.

During its brief existence, Ted was the subject of a popular joke that "Ted" stood for "the end of United." This usually led to related jokes that American Airlines would start its own low-cost brand called "Can" and Northwest Airlines would start "West".

Ted ceased all operations on January 6, 2009 and its components were transferred back to UA mainline operations.

== Destinations ==
At the time of its integration back into mainline United, Ted flew to 23 destinations throughout the United States, including Puerto Rico, and Mexico. Ted's primary hub was at Denver International Airport, and the airline maintained focus cities at Chicago's O'Hare International Airport, San Francisco International Airport, and Dulles International Airport near Washington, DC.

== Fleet ==
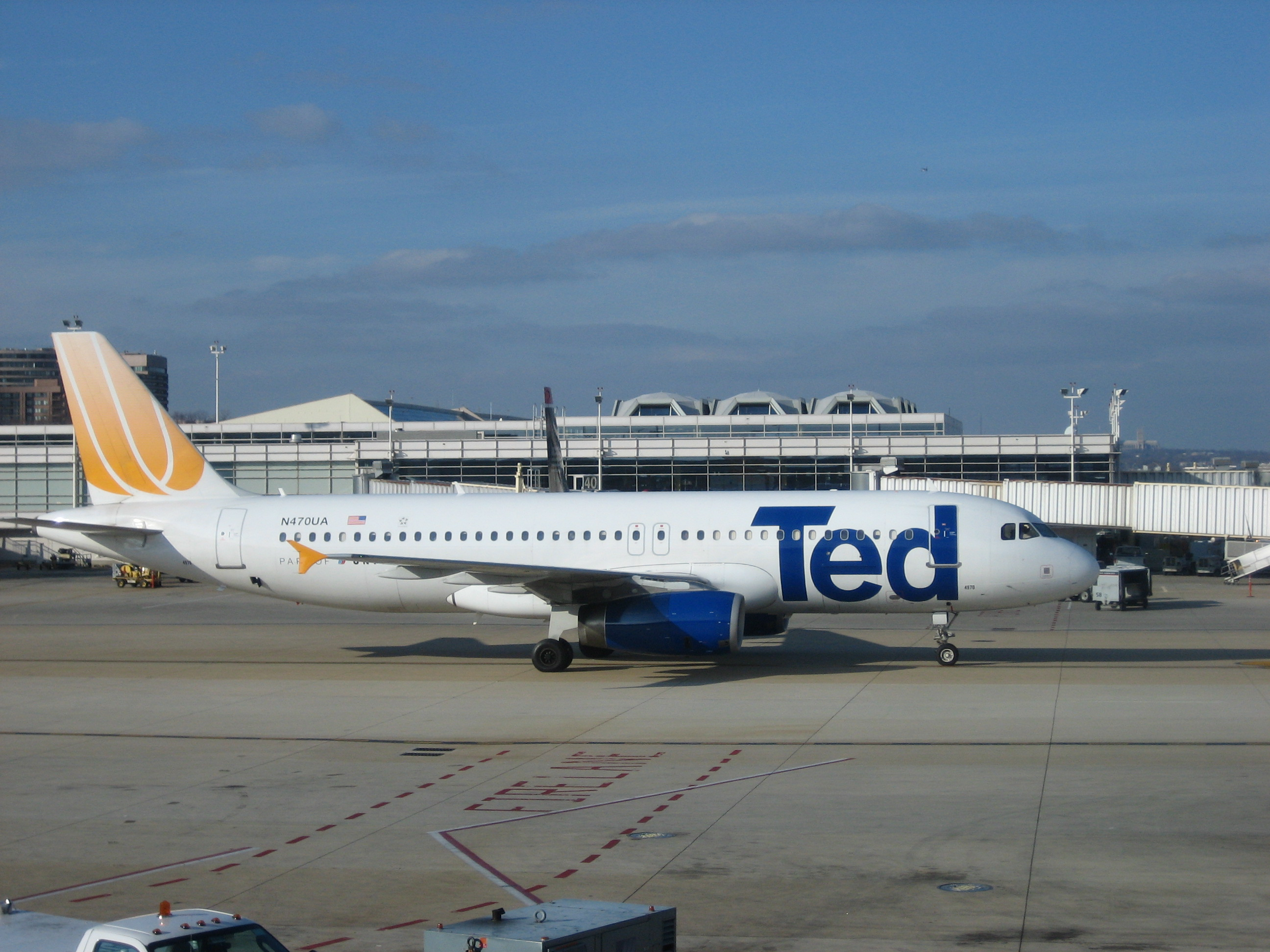
A Ted Airbus A320-200 (N470UA) taxiing at Ronald Reagan Washington National Airport in December 2005

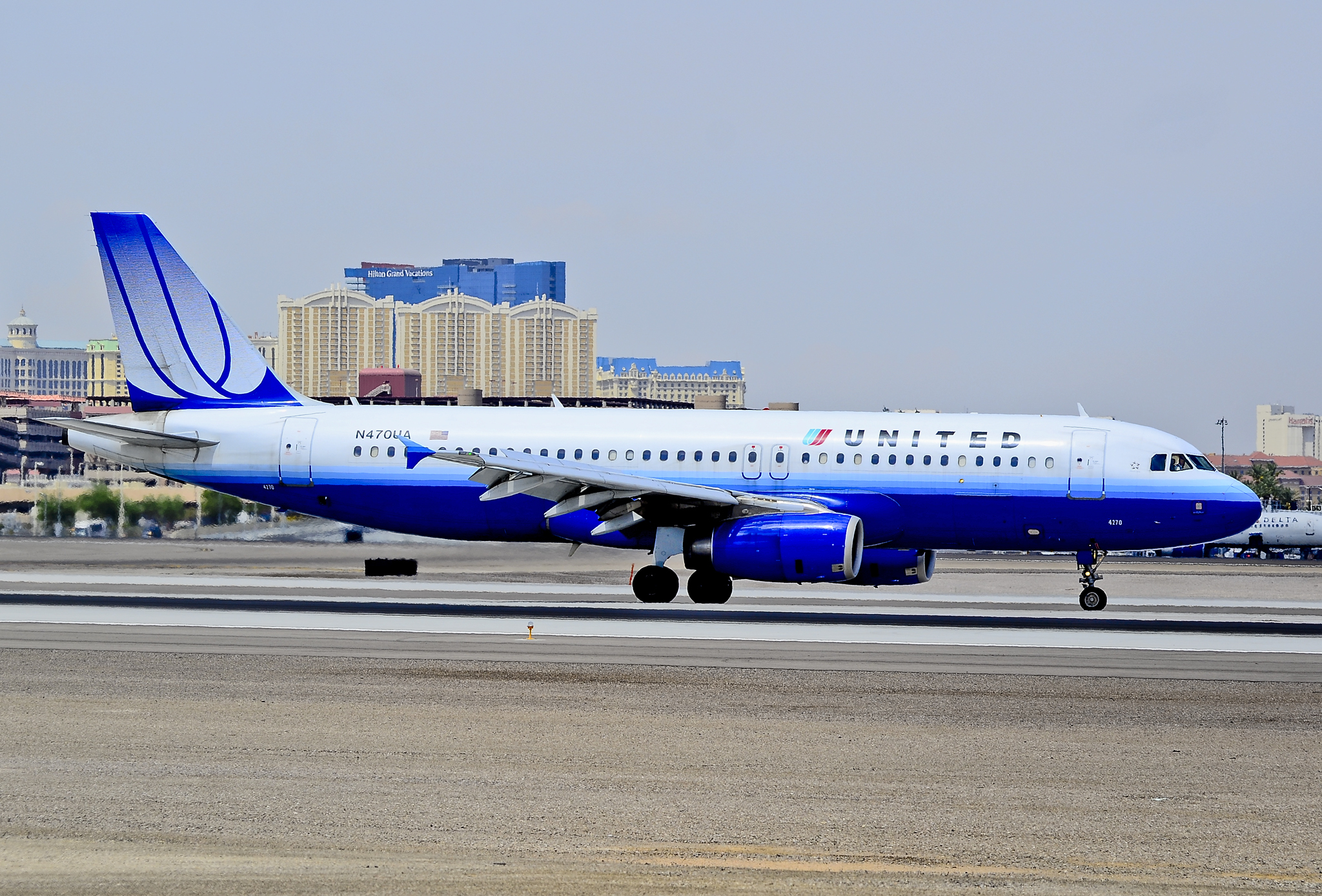
The same Airbus A320-200 (N470UA) seen almost seven years later at then McCarran International Airport in Las Vegas after it was reincorporated back into the mainline United fleet

United dedicated 56 of its 99 Airbus A320-200 aircraft to Ted operations.

Ted fleet
Aircraft	In service	Orders	Passengers	Notes
Airbus A320-200	56	—	156	All returned to United.
Total	56	—		

== Cabin ==
Ted's A320s were configured in one class that was split into two sub-classes. Economy Plus was the first sub-class which included rows 1-11. Economy Plus provided an extra five inches to the existing 31 inches of seat pitch for economy. Ted planes were equipped with 20 overhead retractable LCD screens known as "Tedevision" which were used to play videos throughout the flight. First class seating was not available on Ted flights. Every seat had TedTunes, which had 12 music stations plus a station that played live feeds from Air Traffic Control (channel 9) at the pilot's discretion.

== See also ==
- Air Canada Tango, a low-cost no-frills service offered by Air Canada that operated from 2001 to 2004
- Air Canada Rouge, a low-cost subsidiary of Air Canada operated since 2012
- Continental Lite, a low-cost subsidiary of Continental Airlines that operated from 1993 to 1995
- Delta Express, a low-cost subsidiary of Delta from 1996 until 2003 that preceded Song.
- Jetstar Airways, a low-cost subsidiary of Qantas operating since 2003.
- MetroJet, a low-cost subsidiary of US Airways that operated from 1998 until 2001
- Shuttle by United, another low-cost subsidiary of United's that operated from 1994 until 2001 and preceded Ted
- Song, a low-cost subsidiary of Delta that operated from 2003 until 2006, which replaced Delta Express.
- Zip, a low-cost subsidiary of Air Canada that operated primarily in Western Canada from 2002 to 2004.
- List of defunct airlines of the United States
