= Delta Express =

Low-cost airline of the United States (1996–2003)

IATA	ICAO	Call sign
DL	DAL	DELTA
- Founded: 1996
- Ceased operations: 2003 (replaced by Song)
- Hubs: Orlando
- Focus cities: Boston; New York–JFK
- Frequent-flyer program: SkyMiles
- Alliance: SkyTeam (affiliate; 2000–2003)
- Destinations: 20
- Parent company: Delta Air Lines
- Headquarters: Atlanta, Georgia, U.S.

Delta Express was a no-frills "airline within an airline" brand owned and operated by Delta Air Lines from 1996 to 2003. The airline was headquartered in Atlanta, Georgia.

Delta Express was based out of Orlando International Airport, and focused on leisure routes between Florida and the northeast United States, as well as certain parts of the Midwest. It primarily competed with low-cost brands such as Continental Lite and US Airways' MetroJet, and low-cost carriers such as Southwest Airlines and in the first years of its operation, JetBlue Airways.

The Delta Express aircraft fleet only consisted of the Boeing 737-200, in an all coach class configuration. No in-flight entertainment or meal service was offered.

In 2003, Delta Express was replaced by Song, a new low-fare brand that Delta introduced, which has since also been dismantled.

== Livery ==
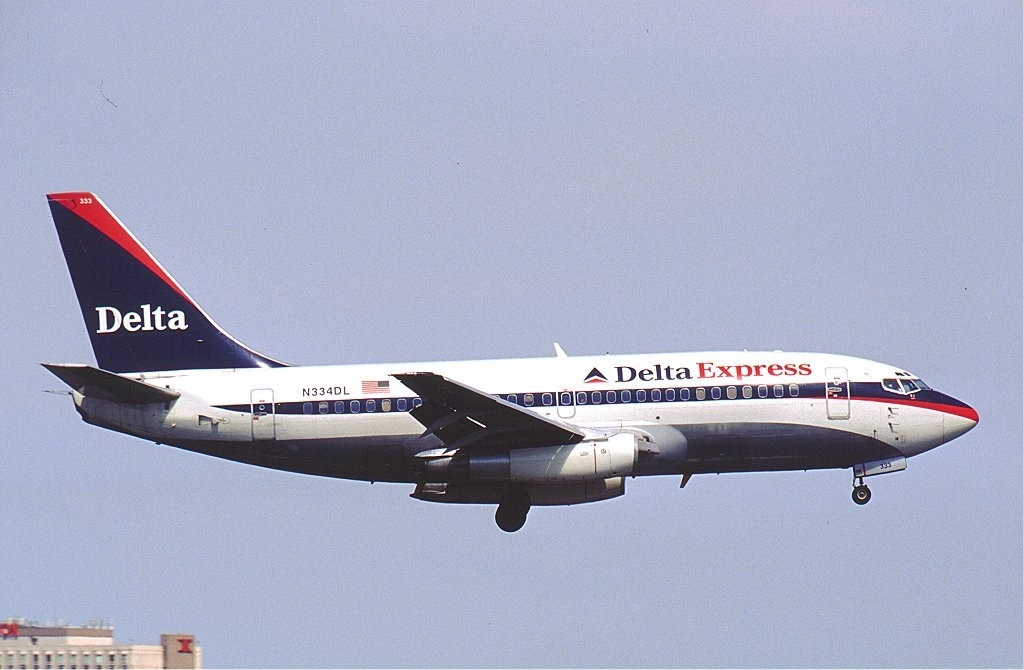
Delta Express Boeing 737 (2001)

Delta Express aircraft bore the same primary liveries as parent company Delta Air Lines, albeit with minor changes. Aircraft initially wore Delta's 1970s-era "Widget" livery, with "Delta" in dark blue and "Express" in light blue and in a revised typeface that would appear on Delta's new branding in 1997. When that livery was introduced, featuring a swooping cheatline and all-blue tail with red accents, the word "Express" was changed to red, but in the same typeface as before. When Delta rebranded again in 2000 to a livery featuring a waving fabric design on the tail, light blue billboard "express" titles were applied to the fuselage, with a small Delta logo above the windows near the boarding door and the airline's web address below.

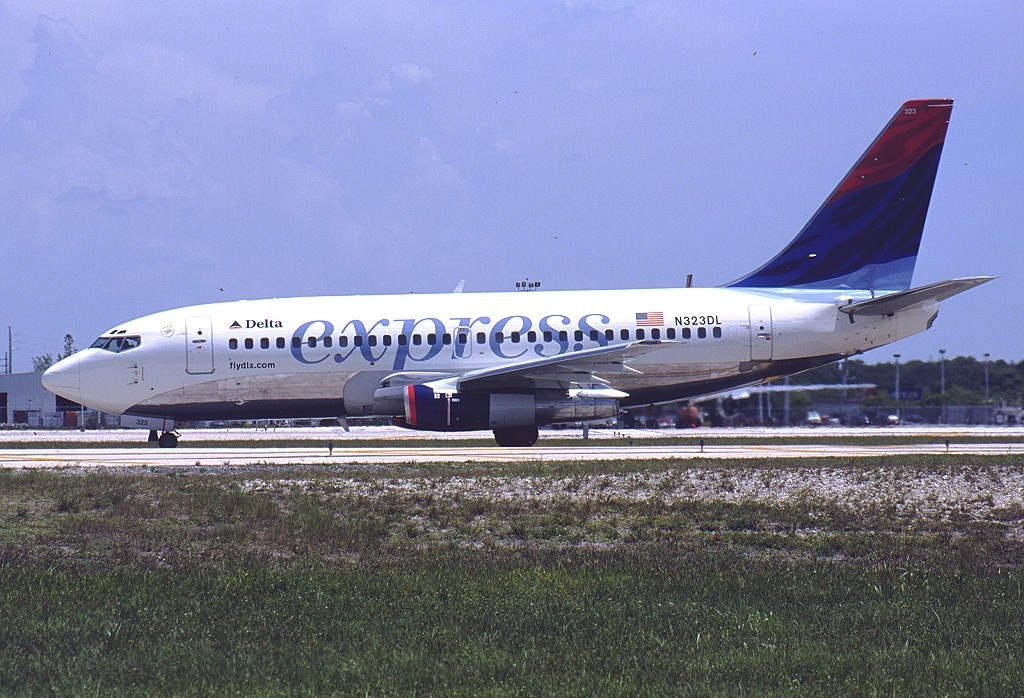
A Delta Express Boeing 737 in the post-2000 livery

Delta Express promoted the Cartoon Network animated television series The Powerpuff Girls by having a Boeing 737-200 (N310DA) painted with a special livery featuring the characters Blossom, Bubbles, and Buttercup on the exterior. The plane's inaugural flight was held at Logan International Airport in Boston, Massachusetts, on July 17, 2000, flying to Tampa International Airport in Tampa, Florida, as Flight 2511. In 2002 the aircraft was repainted with a different Powerpuff Girls theme to promote The Powerpuff Girls Movie.

N310DA, a Boeing 737-200 painted to promote The Powerpuff Girls

== Destinations ==
Delta Express flew to as many as 31 domestic destinations in 18 states which included Albany, Providence, Indianapolis, Pittsburgh, Kansas City, Hartford, Allentown, St. Louis, Milwaukee, Austin, Oklahoma City, Cleveland, Boston, Detroit, New York (JFK, LGA & EWR) to cities like Orlando, Tampa, Jacksonville, West Palm Beach, Fort Myers, and Fort Lauderdale.

== See also ==
- Song
- Delta Air Lines
- Ted
- List of defunct airlines of the United States
