= MetroJet (American airline) =

Low-cost airline of the United States (1998–2001)

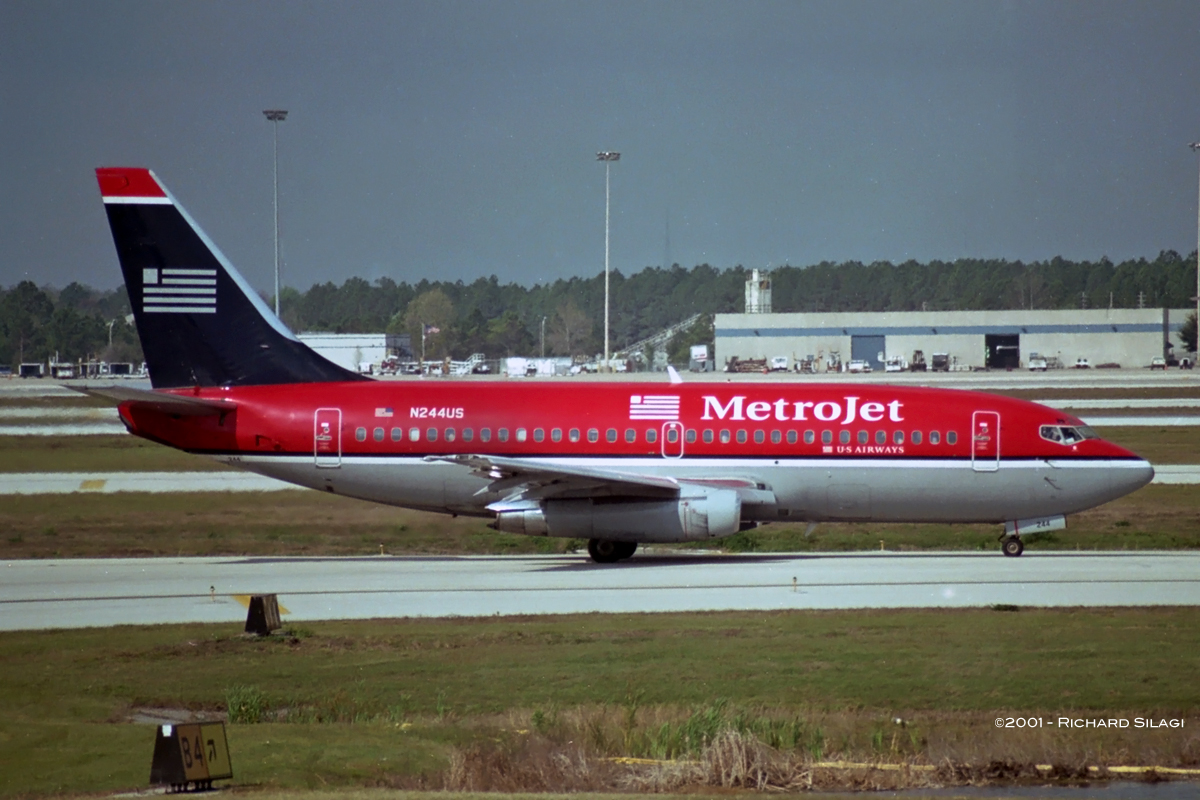
| IATA | ICAO | Call sign |
|---|---|---|
| US | USA | US AIR |
- Founded: June 1, 1998
- Ceased operations: December 2001 (re-integrated into US Airways)
- Hubs: Baltimore/Washington International Thurgood Marshall Airport
- Frequent-flyer program: Dividend Miles
- Parent company: US Airways
- Headquarters: Crystal City, Virginia, U.S.
- Key people: S. Michael Scheeringa (Vice President)

MetroJet was a low-cost airline brand operated as a wholly owned division of US Airways from 1998 until 2001.

== History ==
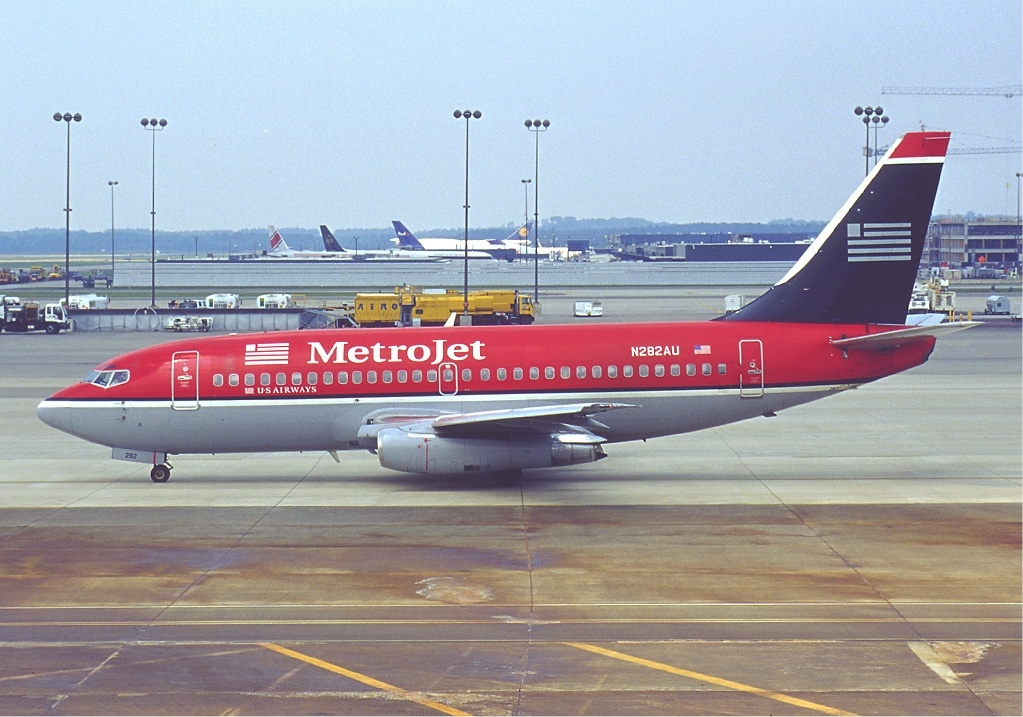
A MetroJet Boeing 737-200

After the conclusion of painstaking labor negotiations in 1997, US Airways sought to head off burgeoning competition from low-cost carriers in its strongest region, the Northeastern United States. Competitor Southwest Airlines was encroaching from its base in the west as were Delta Express and AirTran Airways from the South. Like them it would offer a single class of service, operate a single type of aircraft, which consisted of the Boeing 737-200, and fly a limited network, based at the airline's Baltimore hub. Like similar projects from traditional carriers, including Continental Lite, Delta Express, and Shuttle by United, it would participate in the parent airline's frequent flyer program and other systems.

MetroJet was launched on June 1, 1998, flying from its base at Baltimore-Washington International Airport to Cleveland, Ohio, Providence, Rhode Island, Fort Lauderdale, Florida, and Manchester, New Hampshire. It began with five dedicated aircraft, repainted in a distinctive livery with a red and gray fuselage, and the traditional blue tail with the US Airways logo. It was slated for a measured expansion over the next two years that eventually included flights from Washington Dulles International Airport and several point-to-point operations, with an emphasis on connecting Northeastern passengers to destinations in Florida.

MetroJet operations did not improve US Airways's loss-making record. Many of MetroJet's passengers were cannibalized from other US Airways operations, such as its major presence at Ronald Reagan Washington National Airport. Its aircraft were among the oldest and least fuel efficient in US Airways's fleet, and like its parent its labor costs were among the highest in the industry. Meanwhile, it faced cutthroat competition with Southwest, its main competitor at BWI. In an October 28, 2001 interview with Business Travel News, CEO David Siegel revealed that MetroJet's average cost per available seat mile was 8 cents, compared to 6 cents for Southwest and 10 cents for mainline US Airways.

After the September 11 attacks, US Airways was disproportionately affected by Washington National Airport's extended closure. The resulting financial disaster precipitated the closure of the airline's MetroJet network, which led to the closing of the subsidiary's primary operating base at Baltimore-Washington International Airport and the furloughing of thousands of employees.

US Airways invoked a force majeure clause in its labor contracts to close the operation, announced on September 24. The airline also largely ended its Baltimore hub, which it had inherited from an earlier merger with Piedmont Airlines. Once the largest carrier there, its number of scheduled flights had fallen by 60 percent by the time the last MetroJet 737 was retired in December.

== Destinations ==
- Albany (Albany International Airport)
- Atlanta (Hartsfield-Jackson Atlanta International Airport)
- Baltimore (Baltimore/Washington International Thurgood Marshall Airport) Hub
- Birmingham (Birmingham-Shuttlesworth International Airport)
- Boston (Logan International Airport)
- Buffalo (Buffalo Niagara International Airport)
- Chicago (Chicago Midway International Airport)
- Cleveland (Cleveland Hopkins International Airport)
- Columbus (Port Columbus International Airport)
- Fort Lauderdale/Hollywood (Fort Lauderdale-Hollywood International Airport)
- Fort Myers (Southwest Florida International Airport)
- Hartford (Bradley International Airport)
- Jacksonville (Jacksonville International Airport)
- Manchester (Manchester-Boston Regional Airport)
- Miami (Miami International Airport)
- Milwaukee (General Mitchell International Airport)
- New Orleans (Louis Armstrong New Orleans International Airport)
- New York City (LaGuardia Airport)
- Orlando (Orlando International Airport)
- Providence (T. F. Green Airport)
- Raleigh/Durham (Raleigh-Durham International Airport)
- St. Louis (Lambert St. Louis International Airport)
- Syracuse (Syracuse Hancock International Airport)
- Tampa (Tampa International Airport)
- Tucson (Tucson International Airport)
- Washington, D.C. (Washington Dulles International Airport)
- West Palm Beach (Palm Beach International Airport)

== Fleet ==
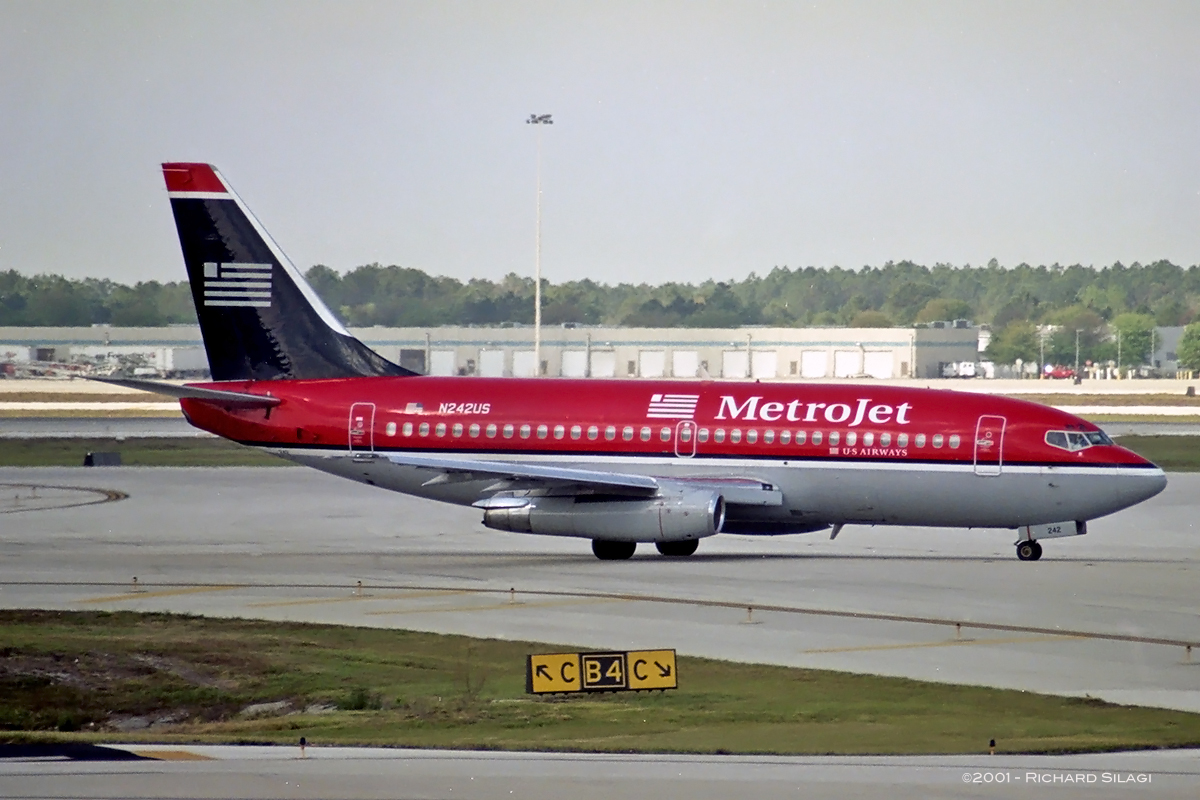
A Metrojet Boeing 737-200 taxiing at KCMO on March 2001.

MetroJet fleet included:

- 49 Boeing 737-200

== See also ==
- Song (airline), a low-cost subsidiary of Delta Air Lines that operated from 2003 until 2006 that replaced Delta Express
- Ted, a low-cost subsidiary of United Airlines that operated from 2004 until 2009
- List of defunct airlines of the United States
