= Song (airline) =

Low-cost airline of the United States (2003–2006)

- Song Boeing 757-200 (N67171)
IATA	ICAO	Call sign
DL	DAL	DELTA
- Founded: 2003
- Commenced operations: April 15, 2003
- Ceased operations: May 2, 2006 (re-integrated into Delta Air Lines)
- Hubs: New York–JFK; Orlando
- Focus cities: Boston; Fort Lauderdale
- Frequent-flyer program: SkyMiles
- Alliance: SkyTeam (affiliate, 2003–2006)
- Fleet size: 48
- Destinations: 17
- Parent company: Delta Air Lines
- Headquarters: Atlanta, Georgia, U.S.
- Key people: Joanne Smith

Song, LLC was an American low-cost air service within an airline brand owned and operated by Delta Air Lines from 2003 to 2006. All Song flights were operated by Delta. Song's main focus was on leisure traffic between the Northeastern United States and Florida, a market where it competed with JetBlue Airways. It also operated flights between Florida and the West Coast, and from the Northeast to the West Coast.

The Song brand was placed on more than 200 flights a day, carrying over 10 million passengers. The airline was notable for affordable prices and luxury amenities, including leather seating, increased legroom, personal entertainment screens, and an emphasis on branding.

The Song brand was dissolved in 2006 following Delta's bankruptcy restructuring, with all of Song's aircraft, routes, and staff reverting to Delta. Many of Song's more popular features, including leather seating, personal entertainment systems, and a simpler booking system, were integrated into Delta's flights as part of its post-bankruptcy rebranding. Song's last flight took off on April 30, 2006. On January 1, 2008, Delta began repainting the last aircraft bearing the Song livery into mainline Delta Air Lines colors.

== History ==
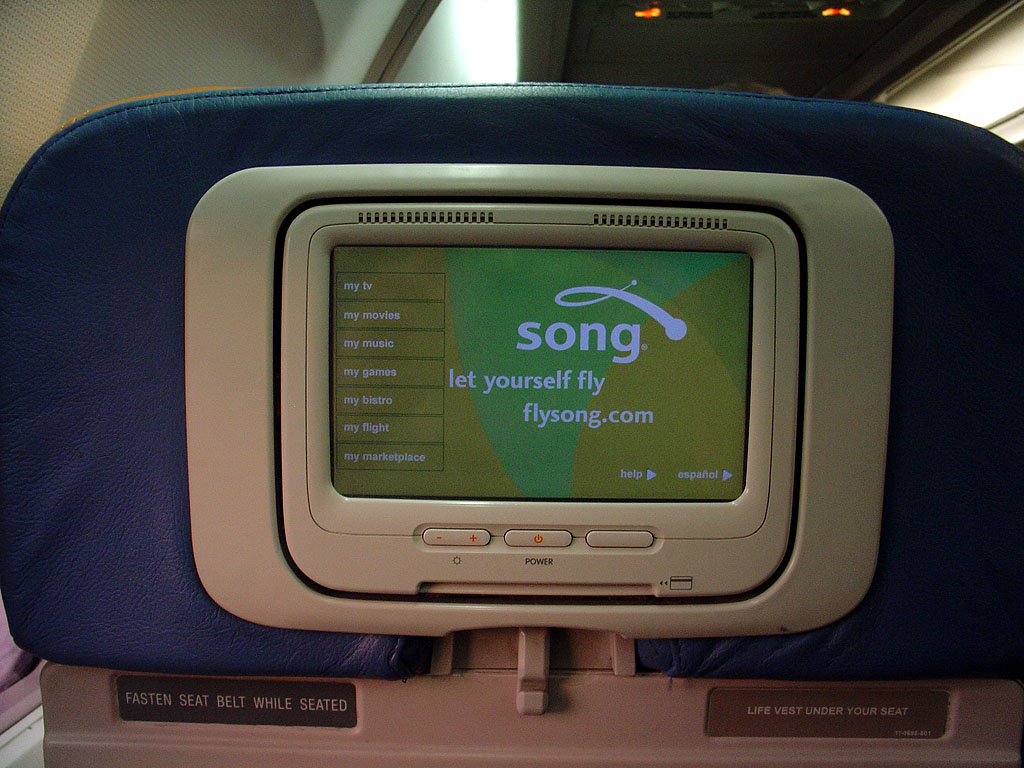
In-flight entertainment system

Before Song began service on April 15, 2003, as a low-cost Delta brand, the service pursued a long-term branding strategy that targeted a particular stratum of hip, style-conscious professional women. Song was the first airline designed to target women. Portions of this branding process were documented in the 2004 Frontline episode "The Persuaders" and in the episode's additional materials. The name, brand identity, cabin interiors and airport environments were designed by Landor Associates in New York. Marketing for the launch of Song included a promotional tie-in with The Apprentice television show, as well as a brick and mortar boutique store called "Song in the City" the SoHo district of New York City and a storefront location in Boston's Prudential Center.

Song was able to launch quickly and easily by repurposing Delta's aircraft, flight attendants, booking systems, and airport resources. Song's aircraft were fitted with leather seats and free personal entertainment systems at every seat, with audio MP3 programmable selections, trivia games that could be played against other passengers, a flight tracker, and satellite television (provided by the DISH Network). Song offered free beverages but charged for meals and liquor. Both brand-name snack boxes and healthy organic meals were offered. The flight safety instructions were sung or otherwise artistically interpreted, depending on the cabin crew. Song flight also included crew uniforms designed by Kate Spade, customized cocktails created by nightlife impresario Rande Gerber and an in-flight exercise program designed by New York City fitness guru David Barton.

On September 14, 2005, Song's parent company, Delta Air Lines, filed for bankruptcy, citing rising fuel costs. Following the bankruptcy, several of Song's key supporters left Delta, and the company was unable to support two brands. In addition, Delta faced pressure from their unions, who were unhappy with Song and the loss of seniority privileges among its flight attendants. On October 28, 2005, Delta announced plans to discontinue the Song brand and incorporate its aircraft into Delta's mainline domestic long-haul operation beginning in May 2006. Eventually, the 48 Boeing 757-200 airplanes were converted to include 26 first-class seats and repainted with Delta colors. The airline's eradication was seen by aviation analysts as a move to reduce costs and emerge from bankruptcy.

Song was officially removed from future Delta schedules on February 22, 2006. Song's final flight was #2056 from Las Vegas McCarran International Airport to Orlando International Airport, which departed at 11:48 p.m. on April 30, 2006.

== Fleet ==
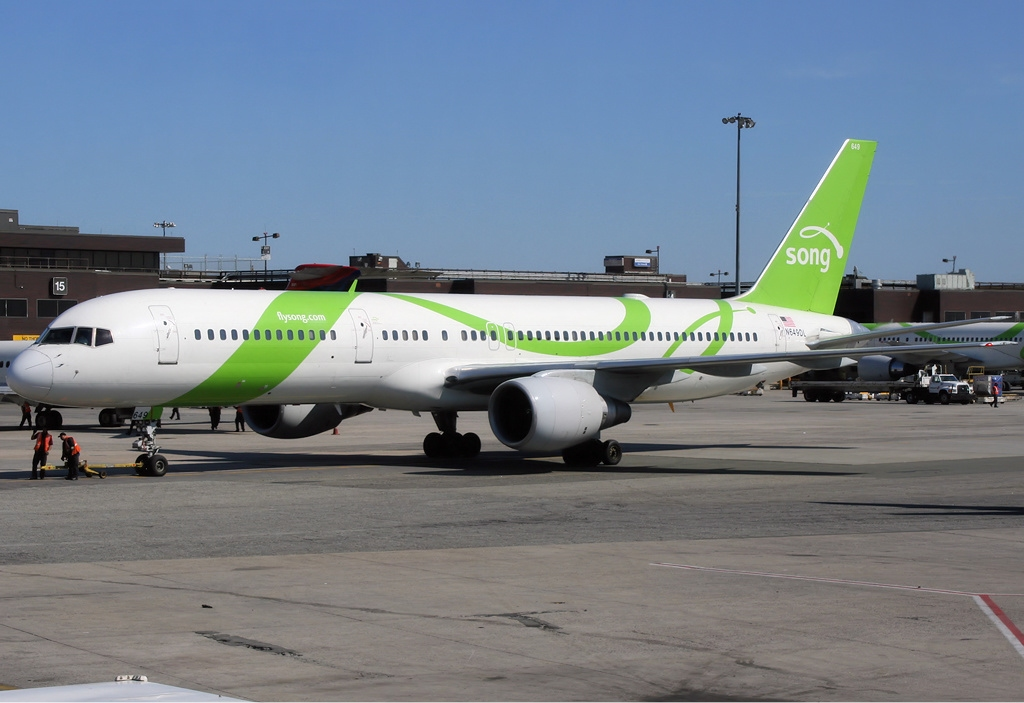
A Song Boeing 757 at JFK International Airport

In 2006, Song's fleet consisted of an all–Boeing 757 fleet.

Song fleet
Aircraft	Number	Passengers	Notes
Boeing 757-200	48	199	All aircraft transferred back to Delta

== Destinations ==
Throughout its history, Song flew to 22 destinations in the U.S. and the Caribbean.

The following destinations were operated by Song when it merged operations back into Delta.

=== Caribbean islands ===
- Aruba
  - Oranjestad (Queen Beatrix International Airport)
- Puerto Rico
  - San Juan (Luis Muñoz Marín International Airport)
- U.S. Virgin Islands
  - Charlotte Amalie (Cyril E. King International Airport)

=== United States mainland ===
- California
  - Los Angeles (Los Angeles International Airport)
  - San Francisco (San Francisco International Airport)
- Connecticut
  - Hartford (Bradley International Airport)
- Florida
  - Fort Lauderdale (Fort Lauderdale–Hollywood International Airport)
  - Fort Myers (Southwest Florida International Airport)
  - Orlando (Orlando International Airport)
  - Pensacola (Pensacola Gulf Coast Regional Airport)
  - Tampa (Tampa International Airport)
  - West Palm Beach (Palm Beach International Airport)
- Massachusetts
  - Boston (Logan International Airport)
- Nevada
  - Las Vegas (McCarran International Airport)
  - Reno/Tahoe (Reno/Tahoe International Airport)
- New York
  - New York City
    - (John F. Kennedy International Airport)
    - (LaGuardia Airport)
- Washington
  - Seattle (Seattle–Tacoma International Airport)

=== Terminated destinations ===
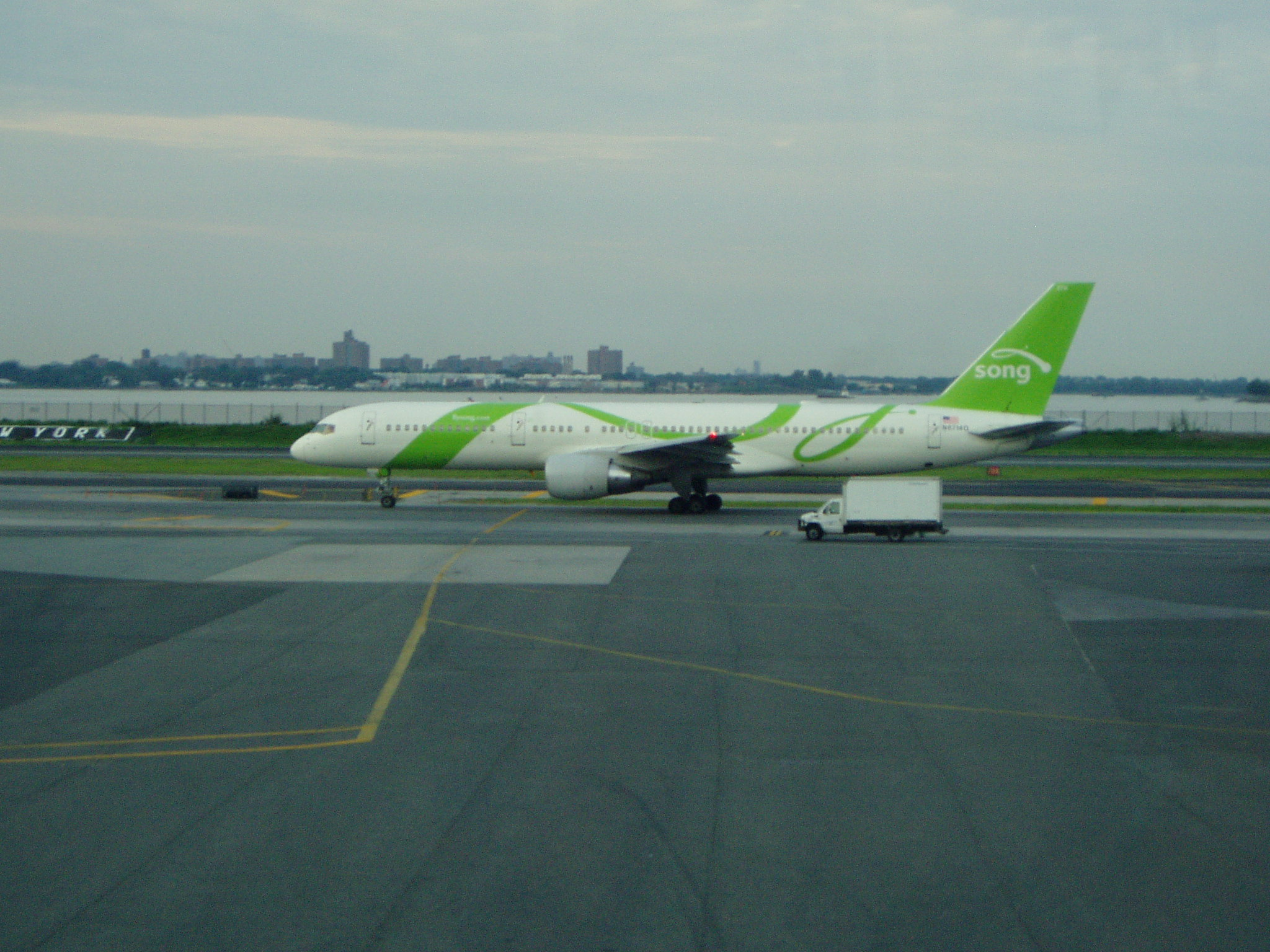
A Song 757-200 at LaGuardia Airport

The following destinations were discontinued prior to the merging of operations.

- Bahamas - Nassau
- United States - Atlanta, Newark, Washington–Dulles

== See also ==
- Shuttle by United
- Ted (airline)
- MetroJet (American airline)
- Continental Lite
- Hooters Air
- JetBlue
