= MileagePlus =

Frequent-flyer program of United Airlines

- Type: Frequent-flyer program
- Owner: United Airlines
- Introduced: May 1981; 44 years ago
- Website: MileagePlus

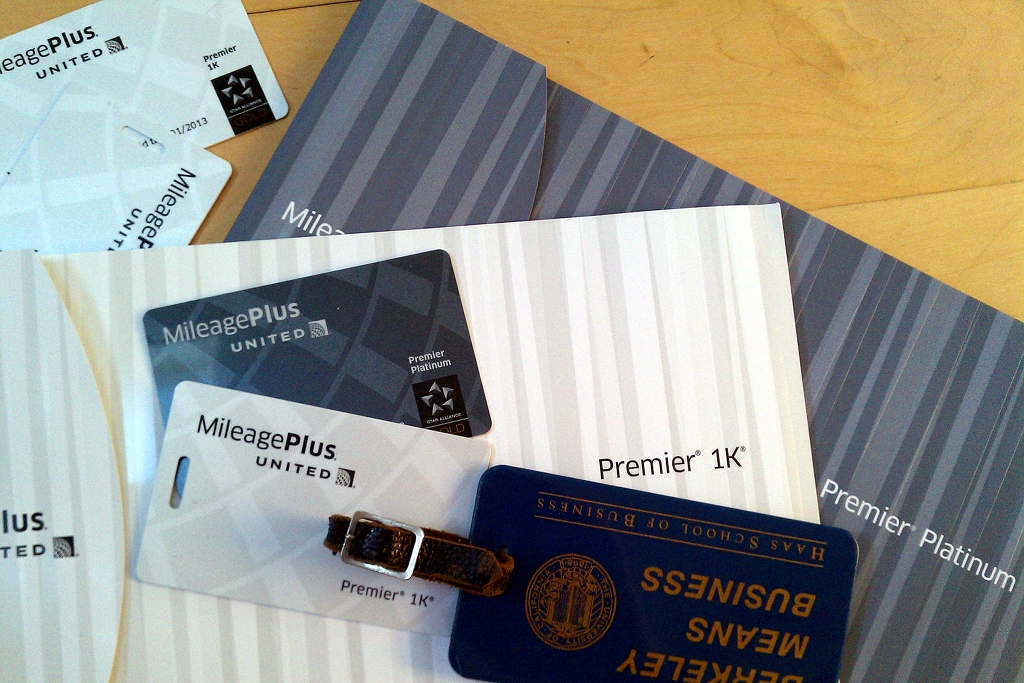
membership card etc.

MileagePlus is the frequent-flyer program of United Airlines that offers rewards to passengers traveling on certain types of tickets. Following the 2010 merger agreement between United and Continental Airlines, United Mileage Plus was chosen to be the frequent-flyer program for the combined airline. The program was subsequently renamed to MileagePlus, and maintains its relationship with its Star Alliance partners, as well as other airline and travel enterprise agreements.

Following the integration and phase out of Continental OnePass on March 3, 2012, MileagePlus also became the frequent flyer program for Copa Airlines and Copa Airlines Colombia. The new program member IDs follow the OnePass format (2 letters + 6 digits) in lieu of the old Mileage Plus format (11 digits), and any members who had existing OnePass member ID numbers retained their existing numbers. In March 2015, Copa Airlines announced that it would phase out the MileagePlus program in favor of a new frequent flyer program called ConnectMiles.

== History ==
Frequent flier programs were introduced in 1979 by Texas International Airlines. Two years later, American Airlines launched their AAdvantage program, and United's Mileage Plus was launched one week later. On June 29, 2011, United officially changed the name of the program from Mileage Plus to MileagePlus.

On July 9, 2011, Tom Stuker became the first member of the MileagePlus program to reach ten million flown miles on United. He earned this distinction flying from Los Angeles to Chicago on flight 942. Jeff Smisek, then president and CEO of United, was on hand to congratulate him. For reaching the ten million mile number, he was given the only United Titanium Card and his name was placed on the side of a United Boeing 747-400. Stuker has since passed the 20 million mile threshold and remains the world's most frequent flyer.

Several controversial changes were introduced to the program in 2012, following the integration of the Continental OnePass program into MileagePlus. This included the reduction in bonus miles for Premier Gold and Premier Platinum members, as well as the inability of Premier Silver members to reserve Economy Plus seats until 24 hours prior to departure. Changes have also occurred to the upgrade process, where upgrades are being sold at check-in for prices as low as $69, even when elites are still being processed on the upgrade waitlist. Million Mile Flyer George Lagen filed, in late May 2012, a class action against United for taking away or demoting "lifetime" benefits promised to pre-merger Million Mile Flyers. A federal judge eventually dismissed the class-action lawsuit on the basis that the contract which regulated "Million Mile Flyer" customers was the same as for all MileagePlus members, which essentially gave the airline the right to unilaterally reduce or discontinue benefits anytime it wanted to.

Following the COVID-19 pandemic in 2020, MileagePlus made it easier for customers to attain status by lowering requirements and giving bonuses to existing status members. But over time, this resulted in diluted status privileges and as of 2024 the MileagePlus requirements are now back to pre-Covid numbers.

== Partner airlines ==
In addition to United, all 28 members of the Star Alliance as well as a number of other airlines participate in the MileagePlus program to a certain degree. MileagePlus miles can then be both earned and redeemed on United flights, as well as on any partner airline. However, certain booking classes on partner airlines are excluded from mileage accrual.

The airline partners of MileagePlus are:

Partner Airline	Star Alliance Member
Avianca	Yes
Aegean Airlines	Yes
Aer Lingus	No
Air Canada	Yes
Air China	Yes
Air Dolomiti	No
Air India	Yes
Air New Zealand	Yes
All Nippon Airways	Yes
Asiana Airlines	Yes
Austrian Airlines	Yes
Azul Brazilian Airlines	No
Brussels Airlines	Yes
Cape Air	No
Copa Airlines	Yes
Croatia Airlines	Yes
Edelweiss Air	No
EgyptAir	Yes
Ethiopian Airlines	Yes
Eurowings	No
EVA Air	Yes
Hawaiian Airlines	No
JetBlue	No
Juneyao Airlines	No (Connecting partner)
LOT Polish Airlines	Yes
Lufthansa	Yes
Shenzhen Airlines	Yes
Singapore Airlines	Yes
South African Airways	Yes
Swiss International Air Lines	Yes
TAP Portugal	Yes
Thai Airways	Yes
Turkish Airlines	Yes

== Award travel ==
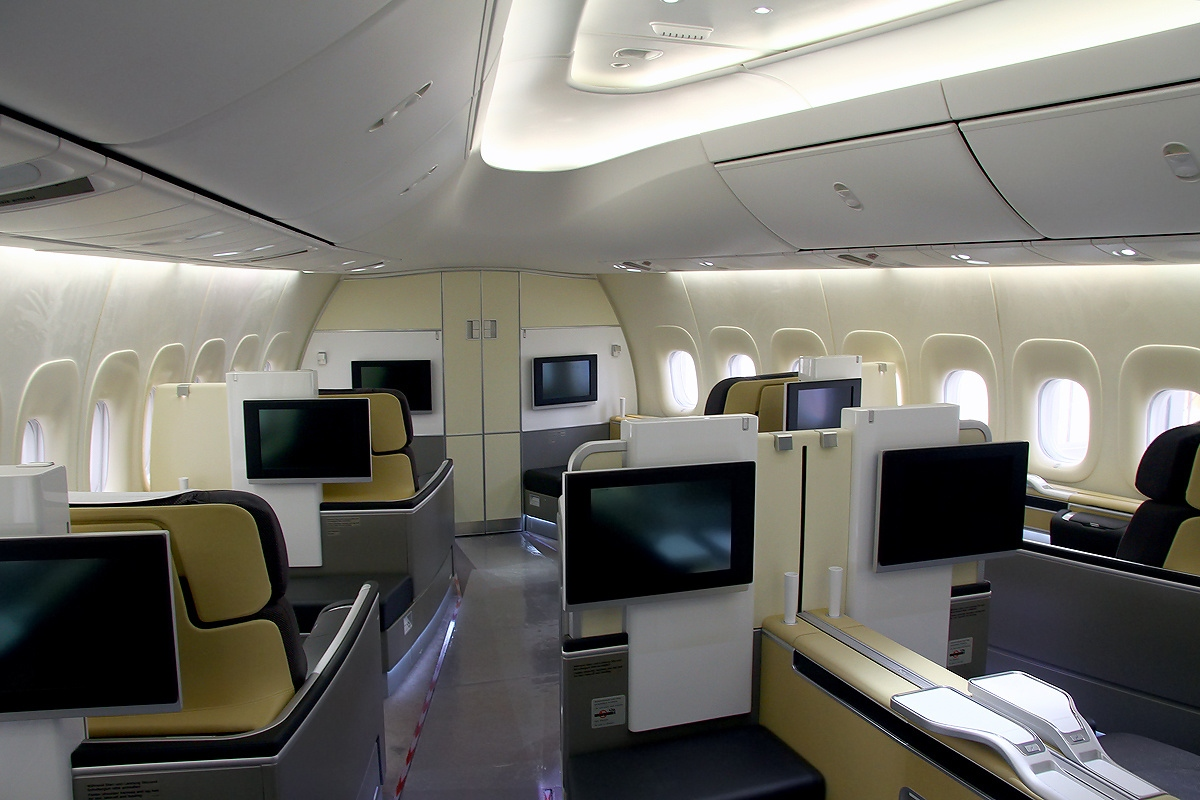
Lufthansa First Class, bookable using MileagePlus award miles

MileagePlus miles (redeemable miles) can be redeemed for travel on any combination of United and United Express carriers, as well as Star Alliance partners and other airline partners. MileagePlus offers Saver and Everyday awards, at different tiers of pricing with different capacity control mechanisms.

Saver awards are capacity-controlled awards available for travel on all partner airlines. The release of saver award seats is dictated by the operating airline, who will make the award inventory available to all its partners, including United MileagePlus. On flights operated by United Airlines, additional saver award inventory is offered to Premier members and United credit card holders, in addition to that offered to general members. These Saver awards are generally priced using a set of fixed "award charts".

Everyday awards are only available for travel on United and United Express, and have greater availability than Saver awards. Because these Everyday awards are dynamically priced based on factors like current demand level and the cash price of the flights, they may cost significantly more than the equivalent "Saver" awards.

As of August 2019, MileagePlus award miles no longer expire. Before that, there had to be activity in the last 1.5 years.

MileagePlus awards are on a one-way basis and do not require round-trip travel.

== Premier status ==
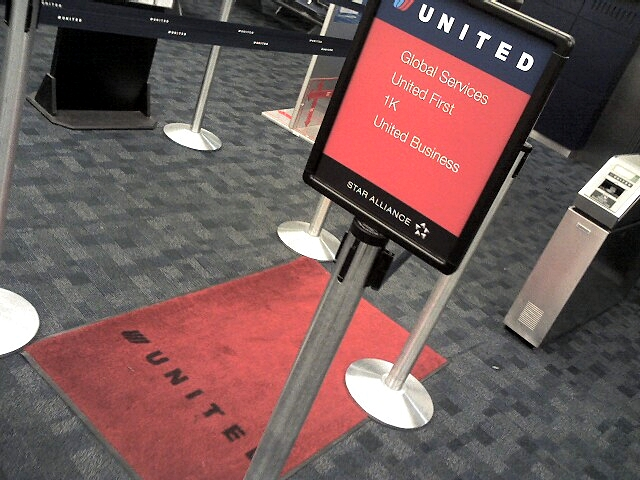
United's red carpet boarding line at San Francisco, the predecessor of the Premier Access Line

While status levels were not originally part of the MileagePlus program, they were introduced in 1987 to reward customers who had achieved certain qualification thresholds within a given calendar year. All Premier members are eligible for Premier Access, which allows them to use exclusive check-in and security lines, as well as priority boarding and baggage retrieval. Previously, members reached Premier status by earning the required number of Premier Qualifying Miles (PQM) or Premier Qualifying Segments (PQS). Starting in 2014, members living in United States had to meet a minimum annual spending level, tracked as Premier Qualifying Dollars (PQD), on United issued tickets in a calendar year to qualify for a tier. Now, members must earn Premier Qualifying Points (PQPs) and/or Premier Qualifying Flights (PQFs). Status can be earned by accumulating PQPs and PQFs, or by attaining a higher PQP threshold.

=== Status Levels ===
Premier Silver status is the lowest status level in the MileagePlus program. This level includes access to Star Alliance Silver status.

Premier Gold status is a mid-level status in the MileagePlus program. This is the lowest level status to include access to Star Alliance Gold status.

Premier Platinum status is an upper level status in the MileagePlus program.

Premier 1K status is the highest status of the MileagePlus Program. Status holders enjoy the highest upgrade priority and access to a dedicated phone line.

Global Services status is a level above Premier 1K. It is a secretive, by-invitation-only status level that provides discrete services to high value individuals that often spend tens of thousands of dollars flying on United per year. Members are often top corporate executives and celebrities. The program was introduced in 2003 and is shrouded in a fair amount of secrecy. Benefits include: Private airport check-in and security, access to private lounges, luxury vehicle tarmac transfer, and exclusive customer service team. United Chairman's Circle is also shrouded in secrecy and comes with Global Services status for the primary member and the member's spouse. Chairman's Circle status is conferred to one individual at companies with significant business partnerships with United.

=== Million Miler Program ===
Million Miler Program is a program offered to MileagePlus members who have demonstrated a long-term loyalty. The Million Miler Program balance is calculated based on the accrued elite qualifying miles prior to January 1, 2012, plus the actual flown miles on United and Copa Airlines after January 1, 2012.

Members receive the following lifetime MileagePlus Premier status based on their Million Miler Program balance:

Million Miler Level	Lifetime Status
1 Million	Premier Gold
2 Million	Premier Platinum
3 Million	Premier 1K
4 Million	Global Services

Members eligible for Million Miler status can also designate a companion (defined as their spouse, significant other, or another individual residing at the same address) to receive the same Premier status as themself.

Infinite Elite was a promotional program offered by Continental Airlines in the early 1990s that offered lifetime Platinum Elite status on Continental for flying a certain mileage amount for a number of continuous years. With the integration of OnePass and MileagePlus, Infinite Elite members were offered Premier 1K status, but did not receive Global Premier Upgrades.

== Upgrades ==
=== Complimentary Premier Upgrades ===
Complimentary Premier Upgrades are offered to all Premier members on flights within North America, Central America and the Caribbean, excluding Premium Service flights and certain flights to/from Hawaii. This is awarded to Premier members on a space-available basis, prioritized by status, then fare class.

=== PlusPoints Upgrades ===
PlusPoints allow Premier Platinum, Premier 1K, and Global Services customers to upgrade paid tickets on any route serviced by United, United Express, and select partner airlines. PlusPoint upgrades are considered instrument upgrades and will clear before Complimentary Premier Upgrades.
