= Continental Lite =

Low-cost airline of the United States (1993–1995)

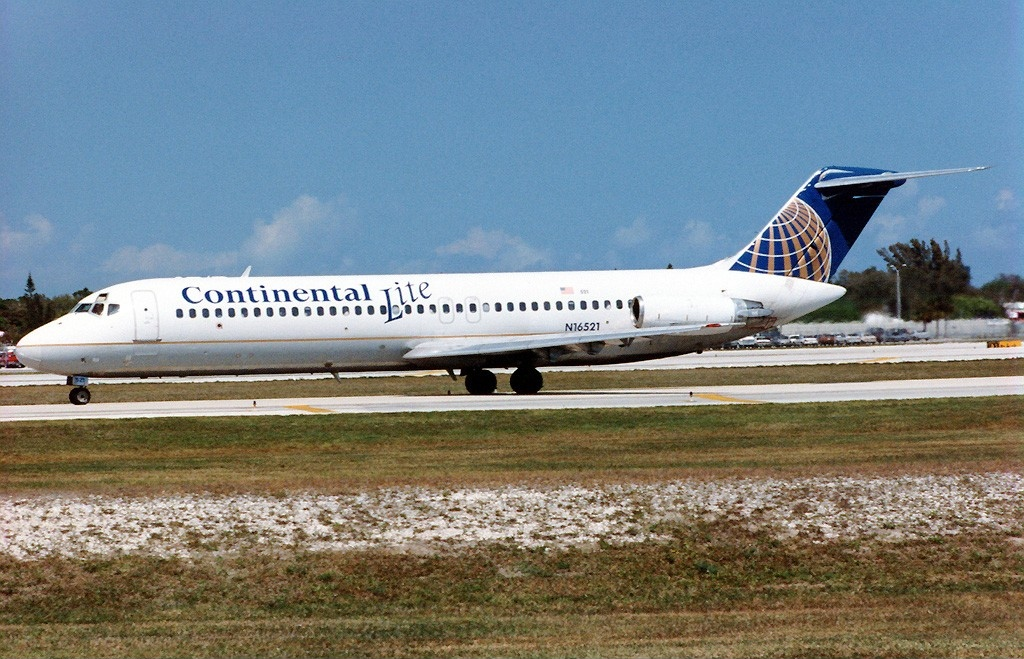
- A DC-9-32 in Continental Lite livery
IATA	ICAO	Call sign
CO	COA	CONTINENTAL
- Founded: 1993
- Ceased operations: 1995 (re-integrated into Continental Airlines)
- Hubs: Cleveland; Greensboro
- Frequent-flyer program: OnePass
- Parent company: Continental Airlines
- Key people: Gordon Bethune

Continental Lite was a short-lived subsidiary brand of Continental Airlines established in 1993. The airline folded in 1995 after losing what has been reported in the press as between $140 million and $300 million.

== History ==
Continental Lite was developed by Continental Airlines to counter the rise of low-cost start up carriers. This despite the fact that Continental had some of the lowest costs in the airline industry due to many of the trade labor unions agreements being tossed out during Frank Lorenzo's reign with Continental through Chapter 11 bankruptcy.

The airline was originally informally known as CALite within Continental; the "Continental Lite" name was formally adopted in 1994. It expanded to serve 45 cities in 1994, primarily on the East Coast, and came to account for a third of Continental's total capacity. After Gordon Bethune took over as the CEO of Continental in 1994, Continental began to distance itself from the service.

Continental Lite operated with a dedicated fleet of McDonnell Douglas DC-9-30, Boeing 737-200, Boeing 737-300, and Boeing 737-500 aircraft, each repainted with the 'Lite' livery and stripped of its first class cabin. This service was based primarily at Continental's existing hub in Cleveland as well as a new hub established in Greensboro, partly replacing the service of Eastern Air Lines in North Carolina. The Greensboro hub had 83 daily flights at its peak in late 1994, and Continental had planned a gate expansion at the airport.

== See also ==
- List of defunct airlines of the United States
