= List of frequent flyer programs =

Frequent-flyer programs (or Frequent-flyer programmes) are customer loyalty programs used by many passenger airlines. This is a list of current airlines with frequent-flyer programs, the names of those programs and partner programs (excluding earn-only, spend-only and codeshare arrangements).

== North America ==
=== Canada ===
- Air Canada – Aeroplan (Partner programs: LifeMiles, Miles & More, MileagePlus, Miles&Smiles,PhoenixMiles, Velocity)
- Air Canada Express – Aeroplan
- Air Canada Rouge – Aeroplan
- Air Creebec – Aeroplan
- Air Inuit – Isaruuk Rewards
- Bearskin Airlines – Connecting Rewards
- Calm Air – Aeroplan
- Canadian North – Aurora Rewards
- First Air – Aeroplan
- Porter Airlines – VIPorter
- WestJet – WestJet Rewards (Partner programs: Flying Blue, SkyMiles)
- WestJet Encore – WestJet Rewards
- WestJet Link – WestJet Rewards

=== Mexico ===
- Aeroméxico – Club Premier (Partner programs: Flying Blue, SkyMiles, SkyPass)
- Aeroméxico Connect – Club Premier

=== United States ===
- Alaska Airlines – Atmos Rewards (Partner programs: Avios, AAdvantage )
- American Airlines – AAdvantage (Partner programs: Avios, Atmos Rewards,Sky Pearl Club)
- American Eagle – AAdvantage
- Avelo Airlines – Avelo Plus
- Breeze Airways – Breezy Rewards
- Cape Air – TravelPass / Atmos Rewards / MileagePlus / SkyMiles (Partner programs: AAdvantage)
- Delta Air Lines – SkyMiles (Partner programs: Flying Blue)
- Delta Connection – SkyMiles
- Frontier Airlines – FRONTIER Miles
- Hawaiian Airlines – Atmos Rewards (Partner programs: Avios, AAdvantage )
- JetBlue – TrueBlue
- Southwest Airlines – Rapid Rewards
- Spirit Airlines – Free Spirit
- Sun Country Airlines – Sun Country Rewards
- United Airlines – MileagePlus (Partner programs: LifeMiles, Miles & More, Miles&Smiles, PhoenixMiles,Velocity)
- United Express – MileagePlus

== Central America & Caribbean Region ==
=== Bahamas ===
- BahamasAir – BahamasAir Flyer

=== Cayman Islands ===
- Cayman Airways – Sir Turtle Rewards

=== Costa Rica ===
- Avianca Costa Rica – LifeMiles (Partner programs: Avios, MileagePlus, Miles & More, Miles&Smiles)
- Sansa Airlines – LifeMiles

=== El Salvador ===
- Avianca El Salvador – LifeMiles (previously Distancia) (Partner programs: Avios, MileagePlus, Miles & More, Miles&Smiles)

=== Guadeloupe ===
- Air Caraïbes – Préférence

=== Guatemala ===
- Avianca Guatemala – LifeMiles (Partner programs: Avios, MileagePlus, Miles & More, Miles&Smiles)

=== Honduras ===
- Avianca Honduras – LifeMiles (Partner programs: Avios, MileagePlus, Miles & More, Miles&Smiles)

=== Jamaica ===
- Caribbean Airlines – Caribbean Miles

=== Panama ===
- Copa Airlines – ConnectMiles (Partner programs: Flying Blue, LifeMiles, MileagePlus, Miles&Smiles,PhoenixMiles)

=== Puerto Rico ===
- Seaborne Airlines – Airmiles

=== Trinidad and Tobago ===
- Caribbean Airlines – Caribbean Miles

== South America ==
=== Argentina ===
- Aerolíneas Argentinas – Aerolíneas Plus (Partner programs: Flying Blue, SkyMiles, SkyPass)

=== Brazil ===
- Azul Brazilian Airlines – TudoAzul (Partner programs: Miles&Smiles)
- LATAM Brasil – LATAM Pass (Partner programs: Avios, Atmos Rewards, Miles & More, SkyMiles)
- Gol Transportes Aéreos – Smiles (Partner programs: AAdvantage, Flying Blue, LifeMiles, Miles&Smiles, SkyPass)

=== Chile ===
- JetSmart – Discount Club (Partner programs: AAdvantage)
- LATAM Chile – LATAM Pass (Partner programs: Avios, Atmos Rewards, Miles & More, SkyMiles)
- LATAM Express – LATAM Pass (Partner programs: Avios, Atmos Rewards, Miles & More, SkyMiles)

=== Colombia ===
- Avianca – LifeMiles (Partner programs: Avios, MileagePlus, Miles & More, Miles&Smiles,PhoenixMiles)
- Copa Airlines Colombia – ConnectMiles (Partner programs: Flying Blue, LifeMiles, MileagePlus, Miles & More, Miles&Smiles)
- LATAM Colombia – LATAM Pass (Partner programs: Avios, Atmos Rewards, Miles & More, SkyMiles)

=== Ecuador ===
- Avianca Ecuador – LifeMiles (Partner programs: Avios, MileagePlus, Miles & More)
- LATAM Ecuador – LATAM Pass (Partner programs: Avios, Atmos Rewards, Miles & More, Miles&Smiles, SkyMiles)

=== Paraguay ===
- LATAM Paraguay – LATAM Pass (Partner programs: Atmos Rewards, Miles & More, SkyMiles)

=== Peru ===
- LATAM Perú – LATAM Pass (Partner programs: Avios, Atmos Rewards, Miles & More, SkyMiles)

=== Suriname ===
- Surinam Airways – Loyal Wings

=== Venezuela ===
- Aeropostal – AeroPass
- Avior Airlines – Avior Plus
- Conviasa – Infinito
- LASER Airlines - LASERClub

== Europe ==
=== Armenia ===
- Fly Arna – AirRewards

=== Austria ===
- Austrian Airlines – Miles & More (Partner programs: LifeMiles, MileagePlus, Miles&Smiles,PhoenixMiles)

=== Belarus ===
- Belavia – Leader

=== Belgium ===
- Brussels Airlines – Miles & More (previously Brussels Privilege and LOOPs) (Partner programs: LifeMiles, MileagePlus, Miles&Smiles,PhoenixMiles)

=== Bulgaria ===
- Bulgaria Air – Fly More

=== Croatia ===
- Croatia Airlines – Miles & More (previously FF Club) (Partner programs: LifeMiles, MileagePlus, Miles&Smiles,PhoenixMiles)

=== Czech Republic ===
- Czech Airlines – OK Plus (Partner programs: Flying Blue, SkyPass)

=== Denmark ===
- Scandinavian Airlines – EuroBonus (Partner programs: Flying Blue, SkyMiles, SkyPass)
- Sun Air – Executive Club

=== Estonia ===
- Nordica Airlines – Miles & More

=== Faroe Islands ===
- Atlantic Airways – Súlubonus

=== Finland ===
- Finnair – Finnair Plus (Partner programs: Avios, AAdvantage, Atmos Rewards)

=== France ===
- Air Corsica – Flying Blue
- Air France – Flying Blue (Partner programs: Sky Pearl Club,SkyMiles, SkyPass)
- Air France Hop – Flying Blue
- Transavia France – Flying Blue
- Chalair Aviation – Flying Blue
- Corsair – Club Corsair
- Twin Jet – Flying Blue
- Wijet – Flying Blue

=== Germany ===
- Condor – Atmos Rewards (Previous partner programs Miles & More)
- Discover Airlines – Miles & More
- Eurowings – Miles & More
- Lufthansa – Miles & More (Partner programs: MileagePlus, Miles&Smiles,PhoenixMiles)
- Lufthansa City Airlines – Miles & More
- Lufthansa Regional – Miles & More

=== Greece ===
- Aegean Airlines – Miles+Bonus (Partner programs: LifeMiles, MileagePlus, Miles & More, Miles&Smiles)
- Olympic Air – Miles+Bonus (Partner programs: Miles & More, Miles&Smiles)

=== Hungary ===
- Wizz Air – Wizz Discount Club

=== Iceland ===
- Icelandair – Saga Club (Partner programs: Atmos Rewards)

=== Ireland ===
- Aer Lingus – AER Club (Partner programs: Avios, Atmos Rewards)

=== Italy ===
- Air Dolomiti – Miles & More
- Alitalia – Millemiglia
- ITA Airways – Miles & More (previously Volare) (Partner programs: MileagePlus, Miles&Smiles, PhoenixMiles)

=== Latvia ===
- airBaltic – airBaltic Club (previously Euro Bonus, and BalticMiles and PINS) (Partner programs: Flying Blue)

=== Luxembourg ===
- Luxair – Miles & More

=== Malta ===
- Air Malta – Flypass (Partner programs: Miles & More)

=== Moldova ===
- Air Moldova – Air Moldova Club

=== Netherlands ===
- KLM – Flying Blue (Partner programs: SkyMiles, SkyPass, Sky Pearl Club)
- KLM Cityhopper – Flying Blue
- Transavia – Flying Blue

=== Norway ===
- Nordic Regional Airlines – Finnair Plus
- Norwegian Air Shuttle – Norwegian Reward
- Scandinavian Airlines – EuroBonus (Partner programs: Flying Blue, SkyMiles, SkyPass,)
- Widerøe – EuroBonus

=== Poland ===
- LOT Polish Airlines – Miles & More (Partner programs: LifeMiles, MileagePlus, Miles&Smiles,PhoenixMiles)

=== Portugal ===
- TAP Air Portugal – TAP Miles&Go (previously Victoria Miles) (Partner programs: LifeMiles, MileagePlus, Miles & More, Miles&Smiles)

=== Romania ===
- TAROM – Flying Blue (Partner programs: SkyPass)
- Carpatair – Carpatair Frequent Flyer
- Blue Air – My Blue Air

=== Russia ===
- Aeroflot – Aeroflot Bonus (Partner programs: Sky Pearl Club,SkyPass)
- S7 Airlines – S7 Priority
- Smartavia – Golden Mile
- Ural Airlines – Wings
- UTair – Status

=== Serbia ===
- Air Serbia – Elevate

=== Spain ===
- Air Europa – Suma (Partner programs: Flying Blue, Sky Pearl Club,SkyPass)
- Air Nostrum – Iberia Plus (Partner programs: Avios)
- Binter Canarias – Bintermás (Partner programs: Avios)
- Iberia – Iberia Plus (Partner programs: AAdvantage, Avios, LifeMiles, Atmos Rewards)
- Iberia Express – None (Partner programs: Avios)
- Level – Avios
- Vueling – Vueling Club (previously Vueling Punto) (Partner programs: Avios)

=== Sweden ===
- Scandinavian Airlines – EuroBonus (Partner programs: Flying Blue, SkyMiles, SkyPass,)
- BRA Braathens Regional Airlines – BRA Vänner

=== Switzerland ===
- Edelweiss Air – Miles & More
- Swiss International Air Lines – Miles & More (previously Swiss TravelClub) (Partner programs: LifeMiles, MileagePlus, Miles&Smiles,PhoenixMiles)

=== Ukraine ===
- Ukraine International Airlines – Panorama Club
- Dniproavia Airlines – Bonus Club
- UTair-Ukraine – Status

=== United Kingdom ===
- Aurigny – Aurigny Frequent Flyer
- BA CityFlyer – The British Airways Club (Partners programs: Avios)
- British Airways – The British Airways Club (previously Executive Club) (Partner programs: Avios, AAdvantage, Atmos Rewards,Sky Pearl Club)
- EasyJet – Flight Club / easyJet Plus
- Jet2 – My Jet2 Travel Club
- Loganair – Clan Loganair
- Virgin Atlantic – Flying Club (Partner programs: Flying Blue, SkyMiles, SkyPass, Velocity)

== Middle East ==
=== Azerbaijan ===
- Azerbaijan Airlines – AZAL Miles

=== Bahrain ===
- Gulf Air – Falconflyer

=== Iran ===
- Mahan Air – Mahan & Miles
- IranAir – SkyGift

=== Iraq ===
- Iraqi Airways – SkyMiles

=== Israel ===
- El Al – Matmid Club (Partner programs: Atmos Rewards)
- UP – Matmid Club

=== Jordan ===
- Royal Jordanian – Royal Club (Partner programs: AAdvantage, Avios, Atmos Rewards)
- Royal Wings – Royal Club

=== Kuwait ===
- Kuwait Airways – Oasis Club

=== Lebanon ===
- Middle East Airlines – Cedar Miles (Partner programs: Flying Blue, Sky Pearl Club,SkyPass)

=== Oman ===
- Oman Air – Sindbad (Partner programs: AAdvantage, Avios,)

=== Qatar ===
- Qatar Airways – Privilege Club (Qmiles) (Partner programs: AAdvantage, Avios, Atmos Rewards, Velocity)

=== Saudi Arabia ===
- Saudia – Alfursan (Partner programs: Flying Blue, SkyMiles, Sky Pearl Club, SkyPass)
- Riyadh Air – Sfeer
- Flynas – Nasmiles
- Flyadeal – Alfuesan
- SaudiGulf – SaudiGulf Club

=== Syria ===
- Syrian Air – SyrianAir Frequent Flyer

=== Turkey ===
- AJet – Miles&Smiles
- Pegasus Airlines – Pegasus Plus
- SunExpress – SunExpress your benefits
- Turkish Airlines – Miles&Smiles (Partner programs: LifeMiles, MileagePlus, Miles & More, PhoenixMiles)

=== United Arab Emirates ===
- Air Arabia – AirRewards
- Emirates – Skywards (Partner programs: MileagePlus, Sky Pearl Club, SkyPass)
- Etihad Airways – Etihad Guest (Partner programs: SkyPass, Velocity, AAdvantage)
- flydubai – Skywards

=== Yemen ===
- Yemenia – Sama Club

== Asia ==
=== Afghanistan ===
- Ariana Afghan Airlines – Ariana Loyalty Club
- Kam Air – Orange Miles
- Safi Airways – Saffron Rewards

=== Bangladesh ===
- Biman Bangladesh Airlines – Biman Loyalty Club
- NovoAir – Smiles
- US-Bangla Airlines – Sky Star

=== Bhutan ===
- Druk Air – HappinessSmiles

=== Brunei ===
- Royal Brunei Airlines – Royal Skies

=== Cambodia ===
- AirAsia Cambodia – BIG
- Air Cambodia – AngkorWards

=== China ===
- Air China – PhoenixMiles (Partner programs: LifeMiles, MileagePlus, Miles & More, Miles&Smiles)
- Beijing Capital Airlines – Fortune Wings Club (Partner programs: Velocity)
- China Eastern Airlines – Eastern Miles (Partner programs: Flying Blue, SkyMiles, SkyPass)
- China Southern Airlines – Sky Pearl Club (Partner programs: AAdvantage, Avios, Flying Blue, SkyPass)
- China United Airlines – Eastern Miles
- Chongqing Airlines – Sky Pearl Club
- Dalian Airlines – PhoenixMiles
- Donghai Airlines – Seagull Club
- Fuzhou Airlines – Fortune Wings Club
- Grand China Air – Fortune Wings Club
- GX Airlines – Fortune Wings Club
- Hainan Airlines – Fortune Wings Club (Partner programs: Atmos Rewards, Velocity)
- Hebei Airlines – Egret Club
- Jiangxi Air – Egret Club
- Juneyao Airlines – Juneyao Air Club (Partner programs :PhoenixMiles)
- Kunming Airlines – Zunxiang Club (Partner programs: PhoenixMiles)
- Lucky Air – Fortune Wings Club
- Okay Airways – Lucky Clouds Club
- Qingdao Airlines – Tianhaizhiyun Club
- Shandong Airlines – PhoenixMiles
- Shanghai Airlines – Eastern Miles
- Shenzhen Airlines – PhoenixMiles (previously King Club) (Partner programs: LifeMiles, MileagePlus, Miles & More, Miles&Smiles)
- Sichuan Airlines – Golden Panda Club (Partner programs: Sky Pearl Club)
- Spring Airlines – Spring Pass
- Suparna Airlines – Fortune Wings Club
- Tianjin Airlines – Fortune Wings Club (Partner programs: Velocity)
- Tibet Airlines – Phoenix Miles
- Urumqi Air – Fortune Wings Club
- XiamenAir – Egret Club (Partner programs: Flying Blue, Sky Pearl Club,SkyPass)

=== Hong Kong ===
- Cathay Pacific – Asia Miles / Cathay (Previously Marco Polo Club) (Partner programs: AAdvantage, Avios, Atmos Rewards, Miles & More,PhoenixMiles)
- HK Express – Asia Miles / Cathay (previously Fortune Wings Club and reward-U)
- Hong Kong Airlines – Fortune Wings Club (Partner programs: Velocity)

=== India ===
- Air India – Maharaja Club (previously Flying Returns) (Partner programs: LifeMiles, MileagePlus, Miles & More, Miles&Smiles,PhoenixMiles)
- Air India Express – Tata NeuPass
- IndiGo – BluChip (previously 6E Rewards) (Partner programs: AAdvantage, Miles&Smiles)
- SpiceJet – Spice Club

=== Indonesia ===
- Batik Air – Batik Air Club
- Citilink – Supergreen GarudaMiles
- Garuda Indonesia – GarudaMiles (Partner programs: Flying Blue, SkyMiles, SkyPass)
- Indonesia AirAsia – BIG
- Lion Air – Lion Passport

=== Japan ===
- Air Japan – ANA Mileage Club
- Air Do – My AirDo
- All Nippon Airways – ANA Mileage Club (Partner programs: LifeMiles, MileagePlus, Miles & More, Miles&Smiles, PhoenixMiles,Velocity)
- ANA Wings – ANA Mileage Club
- Amakusa Airlines – AMX Point Card
- J-Air – JAL Mileage Bank
- Japan Airlines – JAL Mileage Bank (Partner programs: AAdvantage, Avios, Flying Blue, Atmos Rewards, Sky Pearl Club, SkyPass)
- Japan Transocean Air – JAL Mileage Bank
- Jetstar Japan – JAL Mileage Bank / QF Frequent Flyer
- Peach Aviation – Peach Points
- Solaseed Air – Solaseed Smile Club
- StarFlyer – Starlink Members
- Zipair Tokyo – Zipair Point Club

=== Kazakhstan ===
- Air Astana – Nomad Club (Partner programs: Miles & More)

=== Kyrgyzstan ===
- Air Bishkek – Belek Bonus

=== Laos ===
- Lao Airlines – Champa Muang Lao

=== Macau ===
- Air Macau – PhoenixMiles (previously Privileges)

=== Malaysia ===
- AirAsia – BIG
- AirAsia X – BIG
- Batik Air Malaysia – Batik Air Club
- Firefly – BonusLink/ Enrich
- Malaysia Airlines – Enrich (Partner programs: AAdvantage, Avios, Flying Blue, Atmos Rewards)
- MASWings – Enrich

=== Mongolia ===
- Aero Mongolia – Sky Miles
- Hunnu Air – Hunnu Club
- MIAT Mongolian Airlines – Blue Sky Mongolia

=== Myanmar ===
- Air Bagan – Royal Lotus Plus
- Myanmar Airways International – Sky Smiles Club
- Myanmar National Airlines – MNA Club
- Yangon Airways – Elite Club

=== Nepal ===
- Buddha Air – Royal Club
- Saurya Airlines – Saurya Saarathi
- Shree Airlines – High Flyer Club
- Yeti Airlines – SkyClub

=== Philippines ===
- Cebu Pacific – Go Rewards (previously Summit Club, Getgo)
- Cebgo – Go Rewards (previously Getgo)
- PAL Express – Mabuhay Miles
- Philippine Airlines – Mabuhay Miles
- Philippines AirAsia – BIG

=== Pakistan ===
- Pakistan International Airlines – PIA Awards Plus+
- Airblue – Blue Miles
- Air Indus – Indus Miles
- Fly Jinnah – AirRewards

=== Singapore ===
- Jetstar Asia – Qantas Frequent Flyer
- Scoot – KrisFlyer
- Singapore Airlines – KrisFlyer / PPS Club (Partner programs: LifeMiles, Atmos Rewards, MileagePlus, Miles & More, Miles&Smiles, PhoenixMiles,Velocity)

=== South Korea ===
- Air Busan – Fly & Stamp
- Asiana Airlines – Asiana Club (Partner programs: LifeMiles, MileagePlus, Miles & More, Miles&Smiles)
- Jeju Air – Refresh Point
- Korean Air – SKYPASS (Partner programs: Flying Blue, Atmos Rewards, Sky Pearl Club,SkyMiles)

=== Sri Lanka ===
- Cinnamon Air – FlySmiLes (previously Serendib Miles)
- SriLankan Airlines – FlySmiLes (previously Serendib Miles) (Partner programs: AAdvantage, Avios, Atmos Rewards)

=== Taiwan ===
- China Airlines – Dynasty Flyer (Partner programs: Flying Blue, Sky Pearl Club,SkyPass)
- Mandarin Airlines – Dynasty Flyer
- EVA Air – Infinity MileageLands (Partner programs: LifeMiles, MileagePlus, Miles & More, Miles&Smiles,PhoenixMiles)
- Starlux Airlines – Cosmile (Partner programs: Atmos Rewards)
- UNI Air – Infinity MileageLands (Partner programs: PhoenixMiles)

=== Thailand ===
- Bangkok Airways – FlyerBonus
- Thai AirAsia – BIG
- Thai AirAsia X – BIG
- Thai Airways – Royal Orchid Plus (Partner programs: LifeMiles, MileagePlus, Miles & More, Miles&Smiles,PhoenixMiles)
- Thai Smile – Royal Orchid Plus (Partner programs: Miles & More)
- Thai Vietjet Air – Vietjet Skyclub
- Nok Air – Nok Fan Club

=== Uzbekistan ===
- Uzbekistan Airways – UzAirPlus

=== Vietnam ===
- Bamboo Airways – Bamboo Club
- Sun PhuQuoc Airways – Sun Signature
- VietJet Air – Skyjoy (previously Vietjet Skyclub)
- Vietnam Airlines – LotuSmiles (Partner programs: Flying Blue, SkyMiles, Sky Pearl Club,SkyPass)

== Africa ==
=== Angola ===
- TAAG Angola Airlines – Umbi Umbi Club

=== Algeria ===
- Air Algérie – Air Algérie Plus

=== Egypt ===
- Air Arabia Egypt – AirRewards
- Air Cairo - EgyptAir Plus
- EgyptAir – EgyptAir Plus (Partner programs: LifeMiles MileagePlus, Miles & More, Miles&Smiles,PhoenixMiles)

=== Ethiopia ===
- Ethiopian Airlines – Sheba Miles (Partner programs: LifeMiles, MileagePlus, Miles & More, Miles&Smiles,PhoenixMiles)

=== Ivory Coast ===
- Air Côte d'Ivoire – sMiles Program

=== Kenya ===
- Kenya Airways – Asante Rewards (Partner programs: Flying Blue, Sky Pearl Club, SkyMiles, SkyPass)

=== Libya ===
- Afriqiyah Airways – Rahal

=== Madagascar ===
- Air Madagascar – Namako

=== Mauritius ===
- Air Mauritius – Kestrel Flyer (Partner programs: Flying Blue)

=== Morocco ===
- Air Arabia Maroc – AirRewards
- Royal Air Maroc – Safar Flyer (Partner programs: AAdvantage, Avios, Atmos Rewards)

=== Mozambique ===
- LAM Mozambique Airlines – Flamingo Club

=== Réunion ===
- Air Austral – Capricorne Program

=== Rwanda ===
- RwandAir – Dream Miles

=== Seychelles ===
- Air Seychelles – Etihad Guest

=== South Africa ===
- Mango Airlines – Voyager
- Airlink – Skybucks
- South African Airways – Voyager (Partner programs: LifeMiles, MileagePlus, Miles & More, Miles&Smiles, PhoenixMiles,Velocity)

=== Tanzania ===
- Air Tanzania - Twiga Miles
- Precision Air – PAA Royal

=== Togo ===
- ASKY Airlines – ASKY Club

=== Tunisia ===
- TunisAir – Fidelys

=== Uganda ===
- Uganda Airlines – Craneflyer

=== Zimbabwe ===
- Air Zimbabwe – Rainbow Club

== Oceania ==
=== Australia ===
- FlyPelican – (Partner programs: Velocity)
- Jetstar – Qantas Frequent Flyer
- Link Airways – (Partner programs: Velocity)
- Qantas – Qantas Frequent Flyer (Partner programs: AAdvantage, Avios, Flying Blue, Atmos Rewards)
- QantasLink – Qantas Frequent Flyer
- Virgin Australia – Velocity
- Virgin Australia Regional Airlines – Velocity

=== Fiji ===
- Fiji Airways – AAdvantage (Partner programs: Avios, Atmos Rewards)

=== French Polynesia ===
- Air Tahiti Nui – Club Tiare (Partner programs: AAdvantage, Atmos Rewards)

=== New Caledonia ===
- Air Calin – Flying Blue

=== New Zealand ===
- Air New Zealand – Airpoints (Partner programs: LifeMiles, MileagePlus, Miles & More, Miles&Smiles,PhoenixMiles)
- Air New Zealand Link – Airpoints

=== Papua New Guinea ===
- Air Niugini – Destinations

=== Solomon Islands ===
- Solomon Airlines – Belama Club

=== Vanuatu ===
- Air Vanuatu – QF Frequent Flyer

== See also ==
- Airline alliance
  - Oneworld (Affiliate programs: AAdvantage, Avios, Atmos Rewards)
  - SkyTeam (Affiliate programs: SkyPass)
  - Star Alliance (Affiliate programs: LifeMiles, Miles & More, Miles&Smiles, MileagePlus)
  - Value Alliance
  - U-FLY Alliance
  - Vanilla Alliance
