= Smiles S.A. =

- Company type: Sociedade Anônima
- Traded as: B3: SMLS3; Ibovespa Component
- Industry: Loyalty Program Administration
- Headquarters: São Paulo, SP, Brazil
- Revenue: ▲US$ 254.3 million (2018)
- Net income: ▼US$ 163.4 million (2018)
- Owner: Gol Linhas Aéreas Inteligentes S.A.
- Website: www.smiles.com.br
- Footnotes / references "Overview on Smiles S.A." BOVESPA Company information website.

Smiles S.A. is a Brazilian company which manages Smiles loyalty program, the former frequent-flyer program of Varig, a Brazilian carrier, now switched to GOL Linhas Aéreas Inteligentes S.A.

== History ==
Varig launched its frequent-flyer program in 1994, as the biggest airline in Brazil and in 1997 started to use a co-branding strategy with credit card issuers. As Varig's economical conditions became desperate in the early 2000s, the company has been split in two, the "new" Varig with most of the airplanes, routes, and the mileage program, and the "old" one, mainly with the debts. The resulting new company was initially sold to VarigLog, its former air cargo subsidiary. As GOL took over Varig's operations, they decided to absorb the Smiles program, aiming its later conversion for an independent business unit. After the successful IPO of Multiplus, the loyalty program from GOL's competitor, TAM Linhas Aéreas (now part of LATAM Airlines Group), GOL decided to split that business from the airline and go public, which has been carried in April 2013.

In January 2024, Smiles' owner Gol announced that it would be preparing to file for Chapter 11 bankruptcy by no later than February 2024, stating that the airline has been struggling with high debt and recently hired Seabury Capital to help it in a broad capital structure review. As a result, the company's shares tumbled as much as 13%. On 24 January 2024, Gol sought $950 million in financing in order to fund itself during its bankruptcy procedures. On 25 January 2024, Gol declared Chapter 11 bankruptcy in New York in an effort to bounce back from high debt costs caused by the COVID-19 pandemic. During the bankruptcy procedure, Gol will continue to operate while it is currently seeking approval of a creditor-repayment plan. In June 2025, Gol exited its bankruptcy with plans to introduce new routes and add more Boeing planes to its fleet.

== Benefit sharing ==
On July 6, 2010, Delta Air Lines announced an agreement to redeem Smiles mileage for SkyMiles benefits and vice versa. Such announcement was tied to a codeshare agreement between the airlines. Smiles's mileage can also be redeemed for Air France–KLM, Korean Air, Aeromexico, Tap Portugal, Aerolineas Argentinas, Copa Airlines, Etihad Airways, Alitalia, Air Canada and Qatar Airways flights. However, as of early 2020, Delta and GOL have ended their partnership and the subsequent sharing of benefits between the two airlines.
