= Atmos Rewards =

Frequent-flyer program of Alaska & Hawaiian Airlines

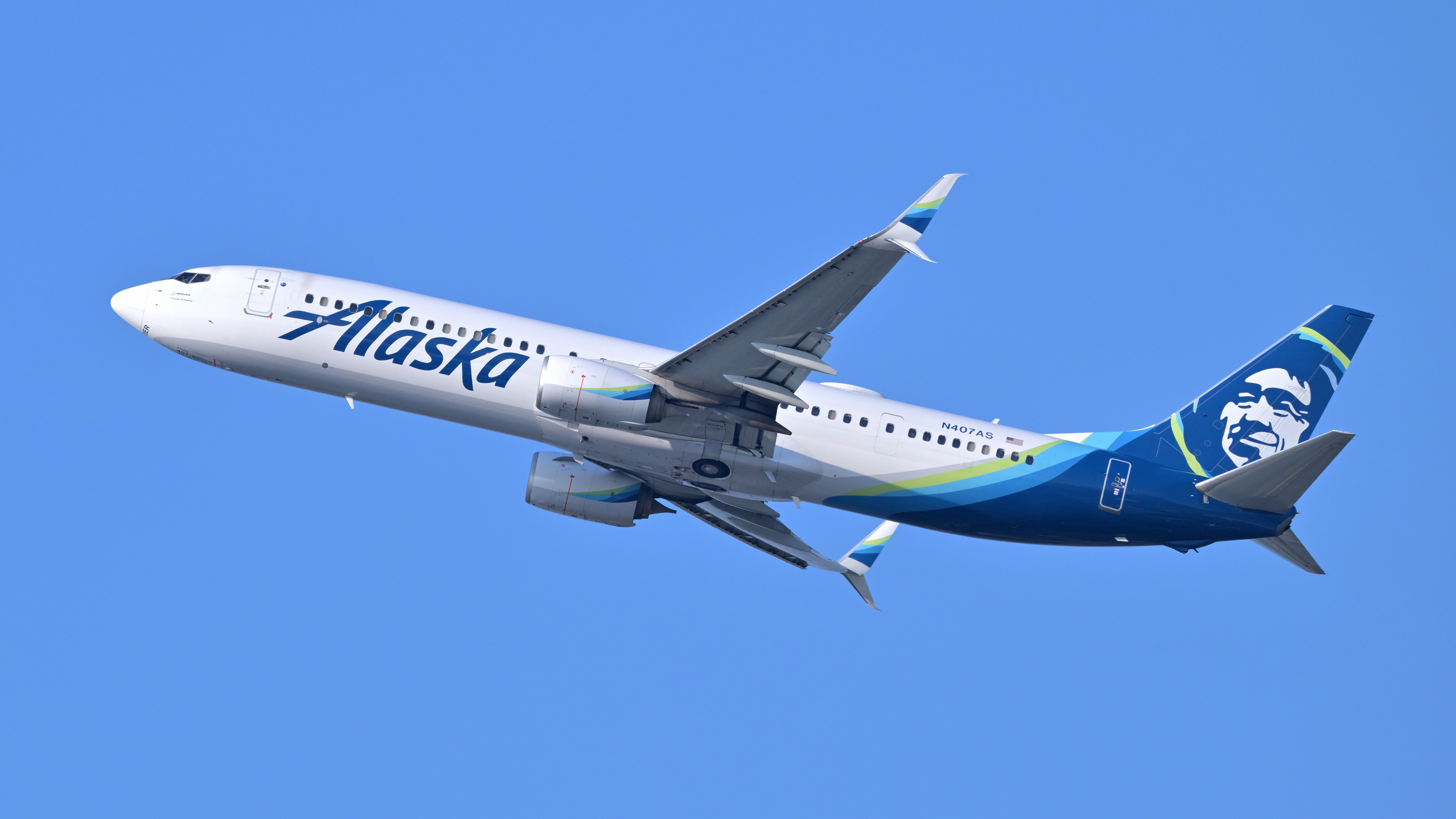
- Type: Frequent-flyer program
- Owner: Alaska Air Group
- Introduced: June 1983; 43 years ago
- Website: atmosrewards.com

Atmos Rewards is the frequent-flyer program of Alaska and Hawaiian Airlines. Members accrue program points by flying Alaska, Hawaiian, or certain partner-operated flights, using co-branded credit cards, and booking vacation and hotel packages, among other methods. Atmos Rewards points can be redeemed for award flights on Alaska, Hawaiian, and many partner airlines. There is recognition for elite status within Atmos Rewards.

== History ==
Atmos Rewards is an airline frequent-flyer program that became active on October 1, 2025. Individuals with Alaska Airlines Mileage Plan or Hawaiian Airlines HawaiianMiles accounts were issued accounts with Atmos Rewards. In September 2024, Alaska Airlines’ acquisition of Hawaiian Airlines was finalized. Following the merger, Hawaiian’s loyalty program, HawaiianMiles and Alaska's Mileage Plan were merged into one program, Atmos Rewards on October 1, 2025. This integration enabled combined status recognition, mile accrual, and award redemption across both carriers.

=== Gold Coast Travel, Personal Passport, Alaska Airlines Mileage Plan and Elevate programs ===
In June 1983, Alaska Airlines introduced its frequent-flyer program, Gold Coast Travel. In 1987, Alaska Airlines acquired Jet America Airlines, which offered a frequent-flyer program called "Personal Passport" since July 1984 that awarded credit by flight segments (number of flights taken), compared to Gold Coast Travel, where members earned credit based on the mileage of flights taken. After acquisition by Alaska Airlines, participants of Jet America's frequent-flyer program were enrolled in Gold Coast Travel, and in September 1989, Gold Coast Travel was renamed Mileage Plan. Alaska Airlines also purchased regional commuter airline Horizon Air in 1986 and incorporated the carrier into Mileage Plan.

In 2016, Alaska Airlines acquired Virgin America, which offered a revenue-based accrual program, Elevate. On January 1, 2018, Elevate was discontinued, with all remaining accounts converted to Mileage Plan accounts along with a choice of 10,000 bonus Mileage Plus miles or a $100 credit towards a future ticket.

=== HawaiianMiles ===
HawaiianMiles was the name of the frequent-flyer program of Hawaiian Airlines. It ceased to exist on September 30, 2025. In advance of the establishment of Atmos Rewards, HawaiianMiles ceased to be airline partners on June 30, 2025 with JetBlue, China Airlines, Virgin Atlantic, and Virgin Australia.

== Program provisions ==
Points are earned on Alaska Airlines and Hawaiian Airlines flights, except on Saver (X class) fares (effective August 1, 2026). It is possible to earn points by Atmos Rewards Bank of America credit card use, flights on partner airlines, purchases for partner car rental, hotels, Lyft, and other partners. Atmos also has a million miler status, where all Alaska and Hawaiian Airlines flights are counted, even Saver (X class) ticketed travels. Points earned do not expire.

== Oneworld membership ==
Alaska Airlines is a member of the Oneworld airline alliance. Passengers can book codeshare and interlining itineraries on all Oneworld airlines through Alaska Airlines. Atmos Rewards points may be redeemed for flights on Oneworld carriers, and Atmos Rewards elite status is reciprocally recognized by member airlines.

Alaska Airlines flights, including Horizon Air flights, have been bookable as part of Oneworld Global Explorer fares since 2008.

In February 2020, Alaska Airlines announced its intention to join the Oneworld alliance in the summer of 2021. This would add seven new airline partners, including Iberia, Malaysia Airlines, Qatar Airways, Royal Air Maroc, Royal Jordanian, S7 Airlines, and SriLankan Airlines. In October 2020, Alaska announced its Oneworld membership date had been moved to March 21, 2021.

In December 2020, Oneworld member Qatar Airways established a mileage partnership with Alaska prior to the commencement of nonstop service from Seattle to Doha.

On March 31, 2021, Alaska Airlines officially joined the Oneworld alliance. Alaska temporarily suspended its partnership with S7 Airlines on March 1, 2022, in response to the 2022 Russian invasion of Ukraine.

In September 2024, Alaska Airlines' purchase of Hawaiian Airlines was finalized and closed, with the latter retaining its independent branding. A combined loyalty program was announced as forthcoming, with Hawaiian Airlines also projected to join Oneworld in 2026, after merging into one operating certificate.

== Partner airlines ==
Through Atmos Rewards, Alaska Airlines and Hawaiian Airlines have partnerships with 31 global airline partners that provide codeshare flights, elite status recognition, award flight redemption, and mileage accrual. Partner airlines include Oneworld, SkyTeam, and Star Alliance members, as well as unaffiliated airlines.

The airline partners of Atmos Rewards are:

Partner	Alliance	Commenced	Status recognition	Redeem points	Earn points
(Republic of Ireland) Aer Lingus	—N/a	2018	No	Yes	Yes
(French Polynesia) Air Tahiti Nui	—N/a	2022	No	Yes	Yes
(United States) Aleutian Airways	—N/a	2024	No	No	Yes
(United States) American Airlines	Oneworld	1999	Yes	Yes	Yes
(The Bahamas) Bahamasair	—N/a	2023	No	No	Yes
(United Kingdom) British Airways	Oneworld	2001	Yes	Yes	Yes
(United States) Cape Air	—N/a	2021	No	No	Yes
(Hong Kong) Cathay Pacific	Oneworld	2003	Yes	Yes	Yes
(Germany) Condor	—N/a	2013	No	Yes	Yes
(United States) Contour Airlines	—N/a	2024	No	No	Yes
Fiji Airways	Oneworld	2009	Yes	Yes	Yes
(Finland) Finnair	Oneworld	2017	Yes	Yes	Yes
(China) Hainan Airlines	—N/a	2015	No	Yes	Yes
(Spain) Iberia	Oneworld	2021	Yes	Yes	Yes
(Iceland) Icelandair	—N/a	2015	No	Yes	Yes
(Italy) ITA Airways	Star Alliance	2026	No	No	Yes
Japan Airlines	Oneworld	2016	Yes	Yes	Yes
(United States) Kenmore Air	—N/a	2023	No	No	Yes
(South Korea) Korean Air	SkyTeam	2008	No	Yes	Yes
Malaysia Airlines	Oneworld	2021	Yes	Yes	Yes
(United States) Mokulele Airlines	—N/a	2023	No	No	Yes
Oman Air	Oneworld	2025	Yes	Yes	Yes
(Philippines) Philippine Airlines	Oneworld (Joining 2027)	2025	No	Yes	Yes
(Canada) Porter Airlines	—N/a	2023	No	Yes	Yes
(Australia) Qantas	Oneworld	1984	Yes	Yes	Yes
Qatar Airways	Oneworld	2020	Yes	Yes	Yes
(Morocco) Royal Air Maroc	Oneworld	2021	Yes	Yes	Yes
(Jordan) Royal Jordanian	Oneworld	2021	Yes	Yes	Yes
(United States) Southern Airways Express	—N/a	2023	No	No	Yes
(Sri Lanka) SriLankan Airlines	Oneworld	2021	Yes	Yes	Yes
(Taiwan) Starlux Airlines	—N/a	2023	No	Yes	Yes

=== Former partners of Mileage Plan ===
Continental Airlines was a partner airline with Mileage Plan starting in 1999.

Delta had been a mileage partner for Mileage Plan from 2004 until 2017, when it established Seattle as a hub city. The partnership with Delta was preceded by a partnership with Northwest Airlines in 1995, prior to the merger of the two airlines. Alaska Airlines was also a former mileage partner with other SkyTeam members, including Aeromexico, from 2013 until 2017, and Air France and KLM, from 2007 until 2018.

Emirates ceased to be a Mileage Plan partner in 2021, shortly after Alaska joined the Oneworld alliance and became partners with regional rival Qatar Airways. The two airlines had a mileage agreement starting in 2012.

Singapore Airlines ceased to be a Mileage Plan partner at the end of September 2025.

== Program Terms ==
Atmos Rewards points do not expire. Previously, Mileage Plan point expired after 24 months of inactivity but the policy was changed in April 2023.

== Club 49 ==
Members who are residents of the state of Alaska or military personnel permanently stationed in Alaska are eligible to participate in Alaska Airlines' Club 49 program. Benefits include:

- Two complimentary checked bags on flights to or from Alaska, for participants and all passengers traveling on the same reservation
- Two Travel Now annual discounts for 30% off refundable one-way Y-class economy fares to, from, or within Alaska on Alaska Airlines, when booked within four days of departure
- Weekly fare sales via email for destinations within and outside Alaska
- Constituent Fare rates of a 30% discount for flights within the state to Juneau, to access the state legislature and state agencies, distributed at the start of the legislative session in mid-January
- The Freight For Less program, allowing participants to ship up to 100 pounds of freight within Alaska through Alaska Air Cargo for $49 plus tax.

== Huaka‘i ==
In late 2024, Hawaii residents will be eligible to join the Huaka'i program, providing benefits such as 10% off one inter-island booking per quarter, a free checked bag, and exclusive network-wide deals each month. Hawaiian Airlines World Elite Mastercard cardmembers will receive 20% off one inter-island flight per quarter, on top of the existing cardholder benefit of two free checked bags.

== Recognition ==
As of 2022, Mileage Plan, Atmos Rewards' predecessor, was the recipient of the U.S. News & World Report Best Airline Reward Program for seven consecutive years since 2015, based on an airline's overall evaluation of six criteria: ease of earning a free round-trip flight, benefits, network coverage, flight volume, award flight availability and airline quality ratings.
