= Miles & More =

Frequent-flyer program in Europe

- Launch date: 1 January 1993; 33 years ago
- Headquarters: Neu-Isenburg, Hesse, Germany
- Website: www.miles-and-more.com

Miles & More is the frequent-flyer program owned and operated by the Lufthansa Group.

== Member airlines ==
The following Lufthansa Group airlines are members of the Miles & More program:

- Lufthansa
  - Lufthansa CityLine
  - Lufthansa City Airlines
  - Lufthansa Private Jet
- Air Dolomiti
- Austrian Airlines
- Brussels Airlines
- Discover Airlines
- Eurowings
- ITA Airways
- Swiss International Air Lines

Additionally, the following airlines adopted Miles & More as their sole loyalty program despite not being owned by the Lufthansa Group:

- Croatia Airlines
- LOT Polish Airlines (since 2003)
- Luxair (since 2012)

== Earning miles ==
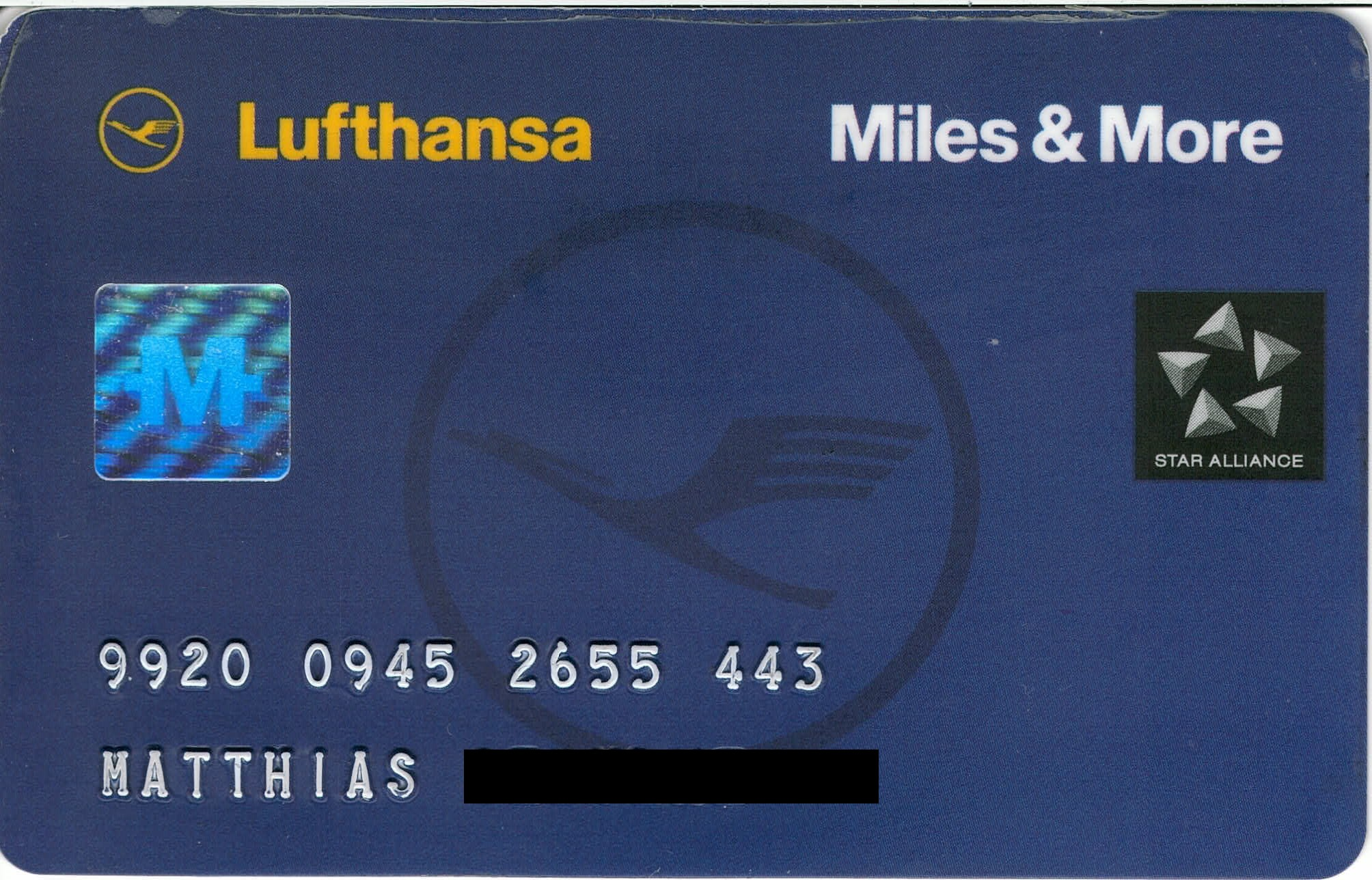
An entry level Miles & More membership plastic card.

There are two types of miles within the program. Award miles that can be collected in the account of a member and be used to buy flights, upgrades, and merchandise from Miles & More partners. Standard Miles & More members retain validity for 36 months, after which they expire. Status miles can only be earned when flying on fully integrated partner airlines or Star Alliance members. In addition, status miles expire at the end of each calendar year. They are used qualify program members for a higher status based on the status miles that they have collected in one year.

There are additionally two special forms of Miles: Select and HON Circle. Select benefits are advantages that can be earned in addition to the status benefits, as part of the program called Miles & More Selections while the status is still valid. Once the member has reached specified mileage levels by flying, additional advantages can be selected. HON Circle miles can only be earned when flying in business or first class on the fully integrated partner airlines and Air-Rail trains in Germany (up to a total of 600,000 miles within two consecutive calendar years). They are necessary to attain the top-tier status on Miles & More – HON Circle.

The miles that a member receives after having completed a flight depend on the Airline issuing the ticket, the amount of miles flown, the class of service, and the booking class. There are other ways to collect award miles when not traveling. The Lufthansa Miles & More Credit Card can be subscribed to (which may be issued as a VISA, MasterCard, or American Express card, depending on the country in which it is issued). Award miles can be earned on certain Deutsche Bahn trains, when staying in certain hotels, shopping in certain shops (such as the LH Worldshop), renting cars, investing in certain funds, opening an account with certain banks, picking up a catalogue in a Bang & Olufsen store, and others.

In late 2022, Lufthansa announced that Miles & More will undergo a major revamp from January 2024, restructuring the entire program - besides other major changes, Miles will be replaced with Points which will additionally be calculated differently.

== Redeeming miles ==
Once a member has collected the necessary number of miles, they can be used to buy flights, upgrades and products from the Lufthansa Worldshop.

Miles in a member's account can be exchanged for award flights on all the fully integrated airline partners and all of the Star Alliance carriers. The number of miles that is deducted from the account depends on the origin and destination of that flight. Additional fees and taxes will still apply for award flights (but can be paid by additional miles). Miles can also be redeemed for upgrades on all fully integrated carriers of Miles & More and on the following Star Alliance partners: All Nippon Airways (ANA), Asiana Airlines, Singapore Airlines, TAP Air Portugal, Thai Airways International. Again the number of miles required depends on the destination of the flight.

Miles can be redeemed for a rental car, hotel, shopping, banks & insurance, telecommunications & electronics industries, etc. Members of the program also earn award miles when paying for their purchases with their Miles & More credit card.

== Status ==
On Miles & More, all customers can build status by collecting points, qualifying points and HON circle points. The points collected from 1 calendar year only count towards status. There are four status levels on Miles & More:

- Miles & More member: This is the entry status that a customer receives after they join the program. This status does not receive any officially documented privileges. A Miles & More member starts with a temporary paper card, which is usually cut out from one of the Lufthansa magazines or printed from the internet; a plastic card is sent once the member has credited at least one award mile to their Miles & More account.
- Frequent Traveller: The frequent traveler card is given to all Miles & More customers that received a total of 650 points and 325 qualifying points. This status remains valid until the end of the year following the year of status obtainment, and requalification or qualification for a higher status can occur during this time. Lifetime frequent traveller can be achieved by obtaining 30 000 qualifying points in total without any time restrictions.
- Senator: Having collected 2000 points and 1000 qualifying points within one calendar year, Miles & More members will receive "Senator" Status, valid until the end of the following year. Lifetime senator status can be achieved by accruing a total of 40 000 qualifying points.
- HON Circle: Having collected 6000 HON circle points within a calendar year, Miles & More members receive HON Circle Status, valid until the end of the following year.

== Earning Points ==
- Points: Points can be earned by flying Miles & More partner airlines or Star Alliance member airlines.
- Qualifying Points: Qualifying points can be earned by flying Miles & More partner airlines.
- HON Circle Points: HON Circle points can be earned by flying First class or Business class with Miles & More partner airlines.
