= Aeroméxico Rewards =

Aeroméxico frequent-flyer program

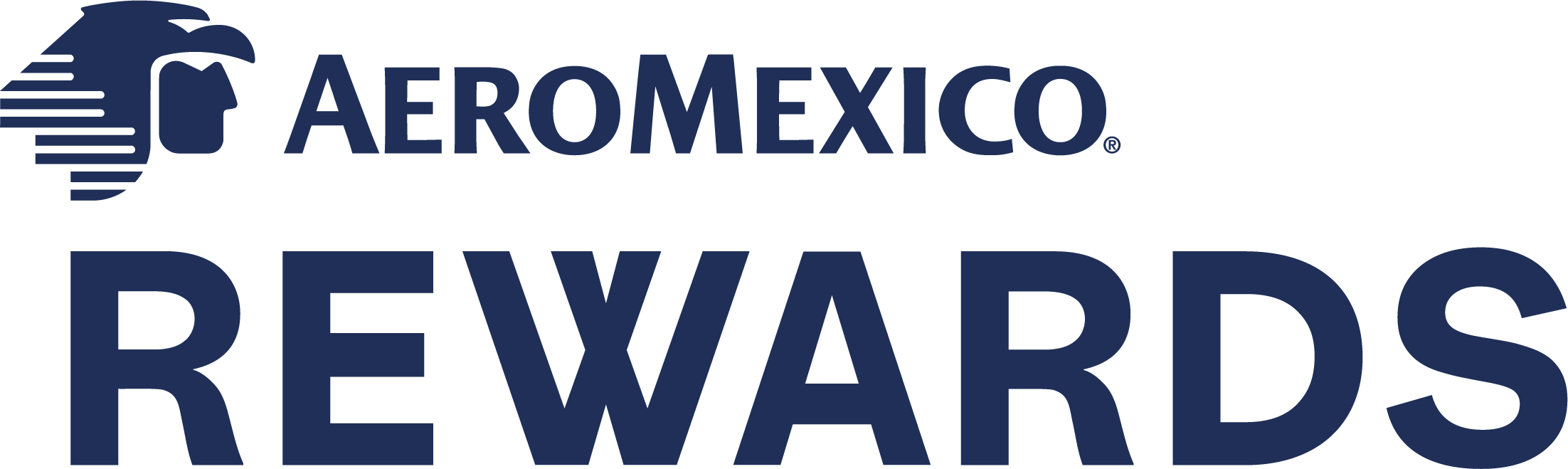
- Type: Subsidiary
- Industry: Marketing/Consumer Discretionary
- Headquarters: Mexico City, D.F., Mexico
- Key people: Andrés Conesa Labastida (CEO)
- Owner: Aeromexico
- Website: www.aeromexicorewards.com

Aeroméxico Rewards is the frequent flyer program focused on travelers from Mexico, belonging to Grupo Aeroméxico.

== History of ownership structure ==
In September 2010, AIMIA, formerly Groupe Aeroplan, acquired approximately 29% of Aeroméxico Rewards, formerly known as Club Premier for US$35 million. Aeroméxico Rewards became independent from Aeroméxico. To do this, Grupo Aeroméxico and Groupe Aeroplan created Premier Loyalty & Marketing, S.A.P.I. de C.V. ("PLM") company to operate Club Premier, now Aeroméxico Rewards

In December 2012, Groupe Aeroplan invested another US$88 million to acquire 20% more of PLM, AIMIA controlled 49% of PLM and Aeroméxico 51%.

In September 2022, Grupo Aeroméxico bought 49% for PLM. After 10 years the program returned to GAM.

In April 2023, Grupo Aeroméxico made a transformation changing the brand's name to Aeroméxico Rewards.

== Members ==
Aeroméxico Rewards has more than 7.5 million members. The Members can earn points with Aeroméxico, SkyTeam airlines, and Alaska, LAN and Copa Airlines, hotels and car rental, and in other establishments, focused on travel.

Aeroméxico Rewards has different business partners, such as Uber, Linio, Cadillac, etc., which can accumulate and use Aeroméxico Rewards Points.

Aeroméxico Rewards has "co-branded" cards with American Express, Santander in Mexico and U.S. Bank in the United States.

== Premier Lounges ==
Aeromexico Rewards currently has 7 Premier Lounges located in the following cities:

- Mexico City
- Guadalajara
- Monterrey
- Mérida

Previously, Premier lounges were also operated in Cancún, Chihuahua, Ciudad Juárez, Culiacán, Tijuana, and Torreón.

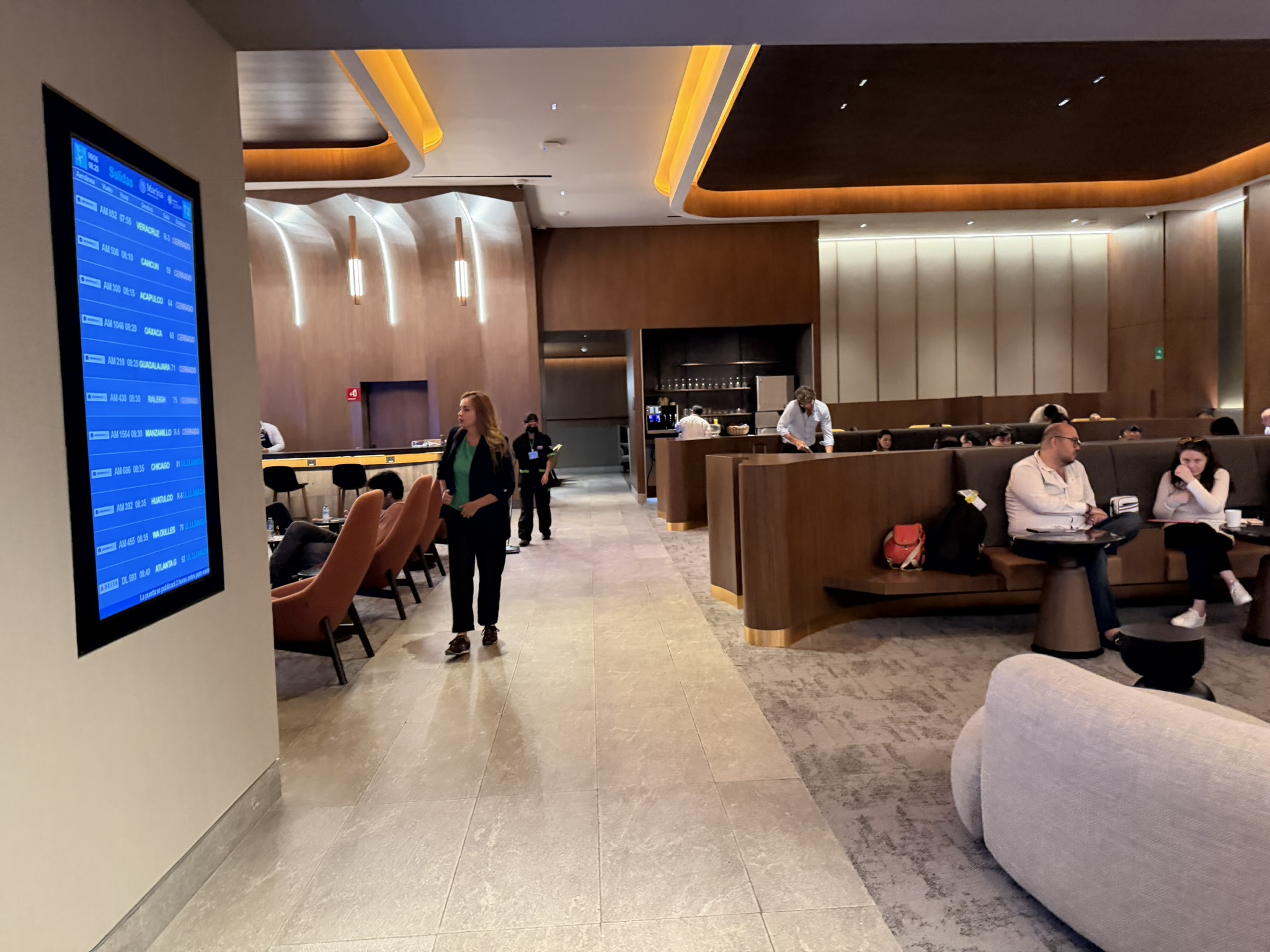

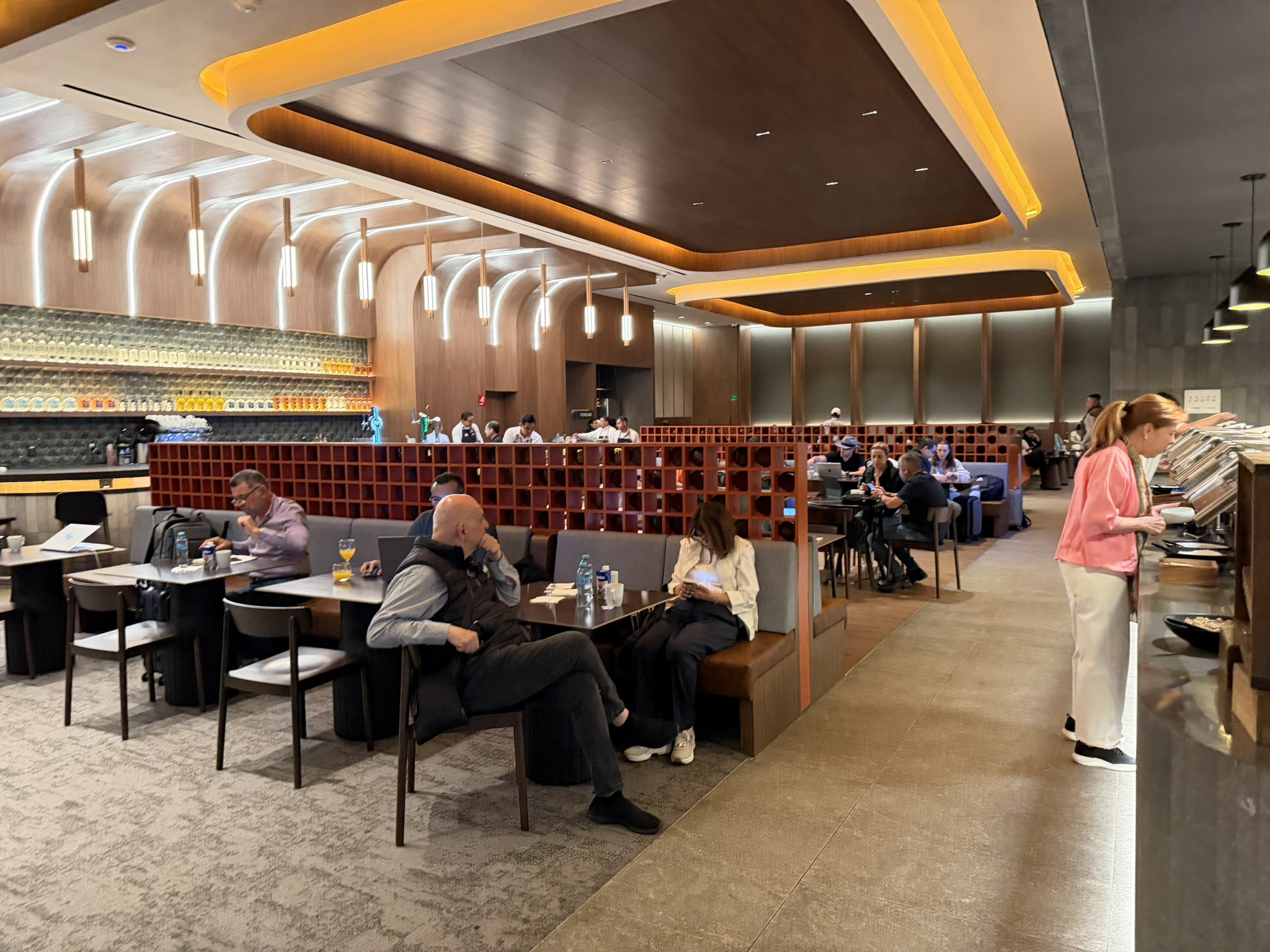

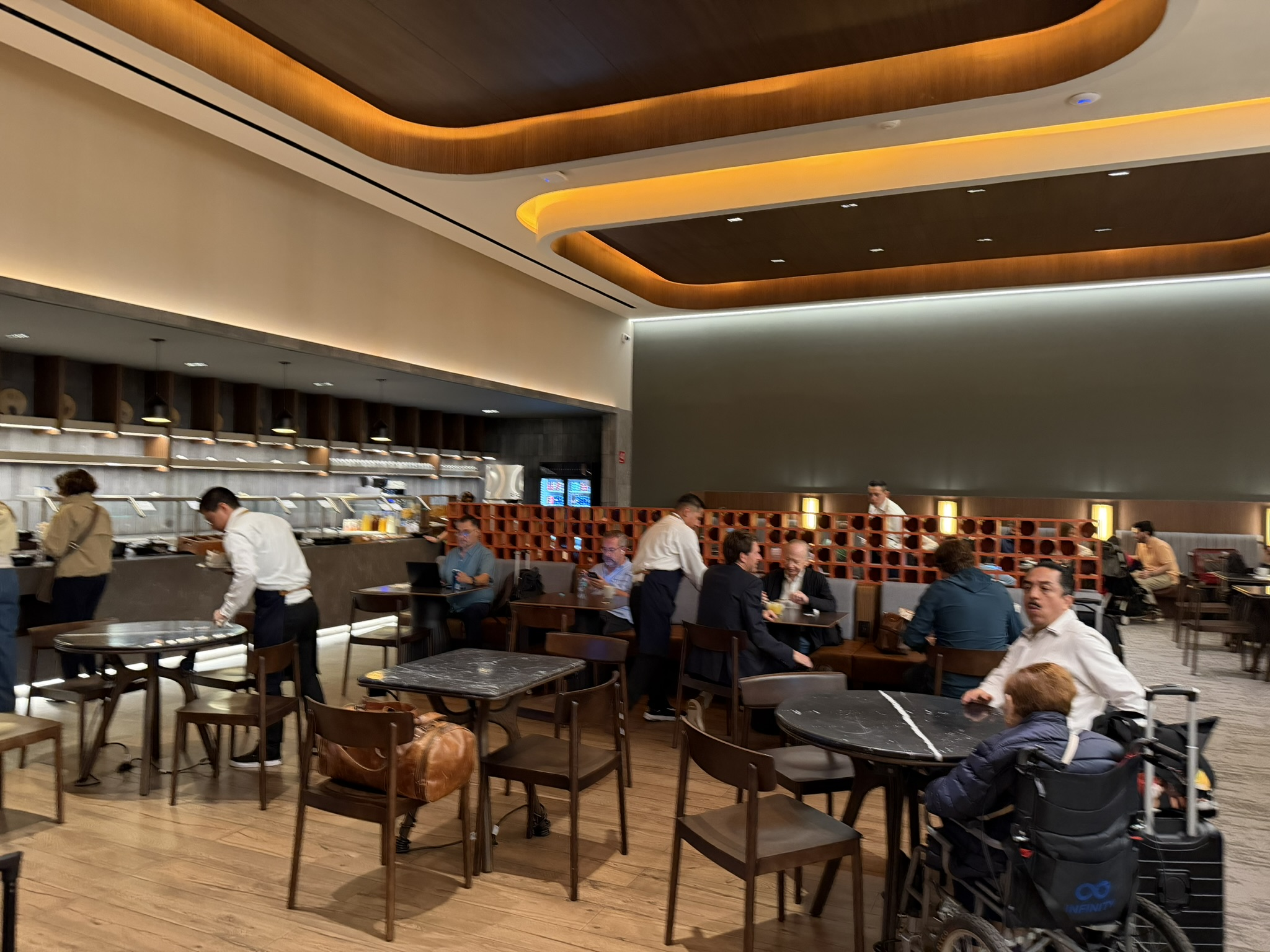

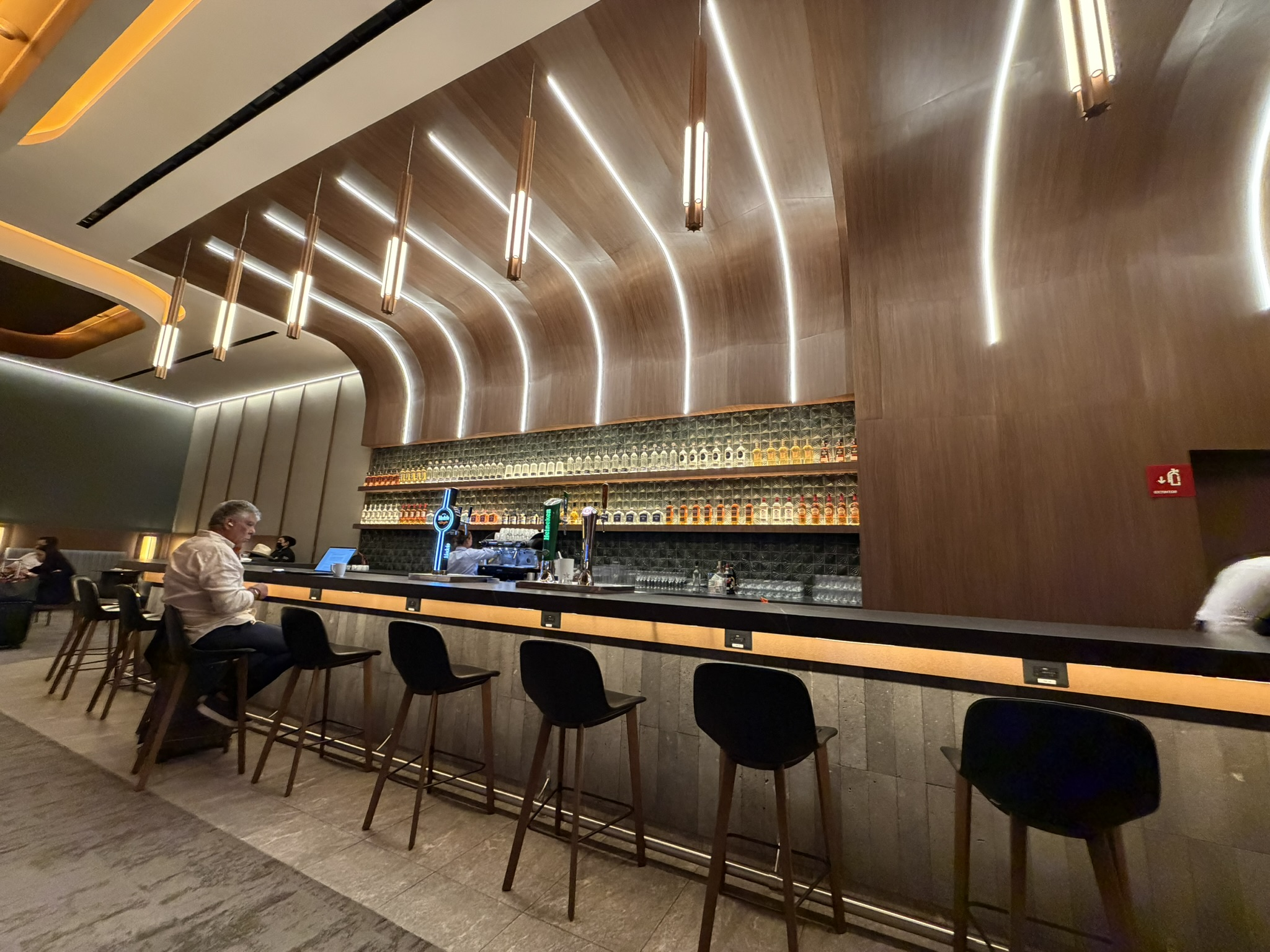

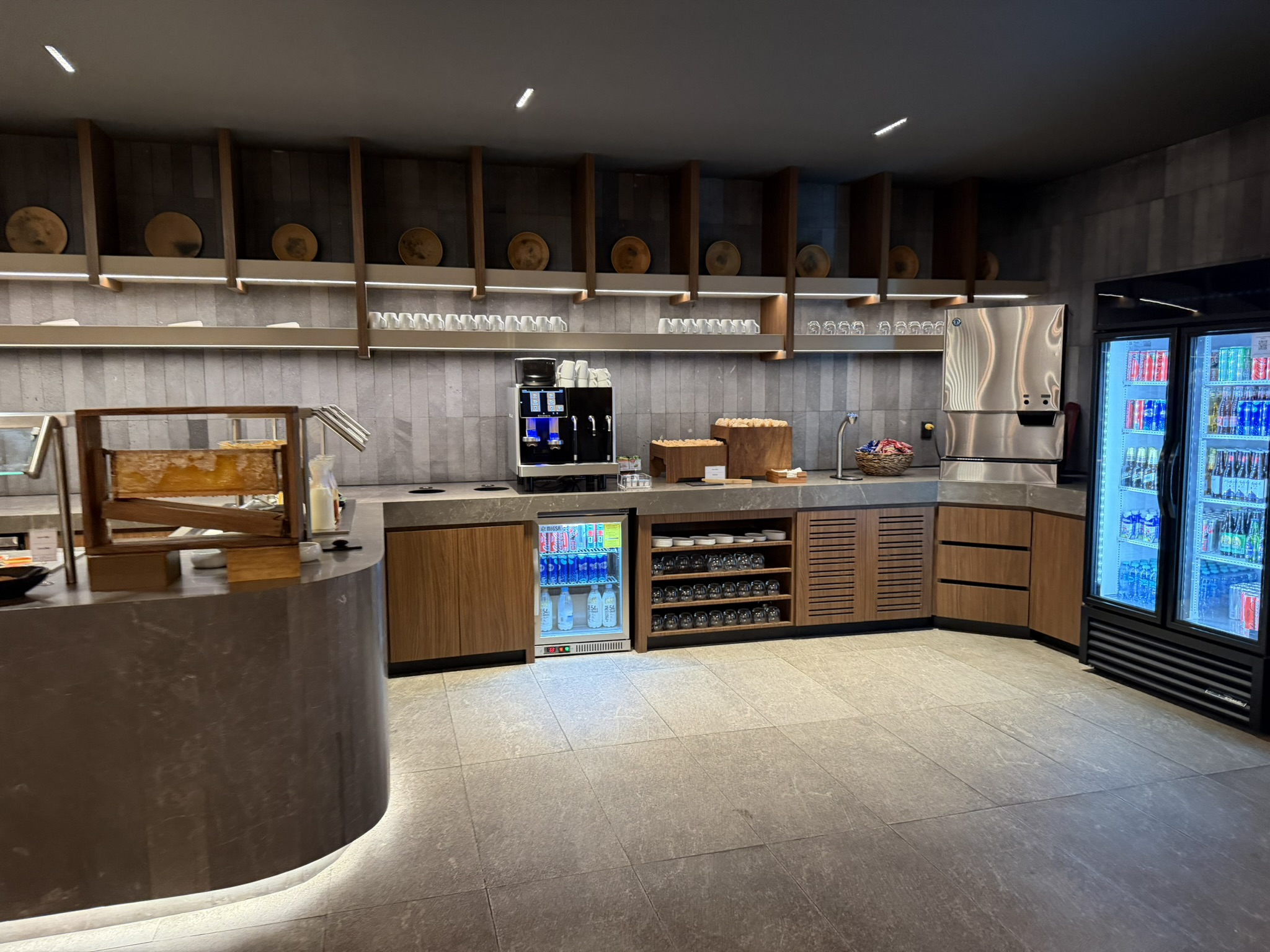

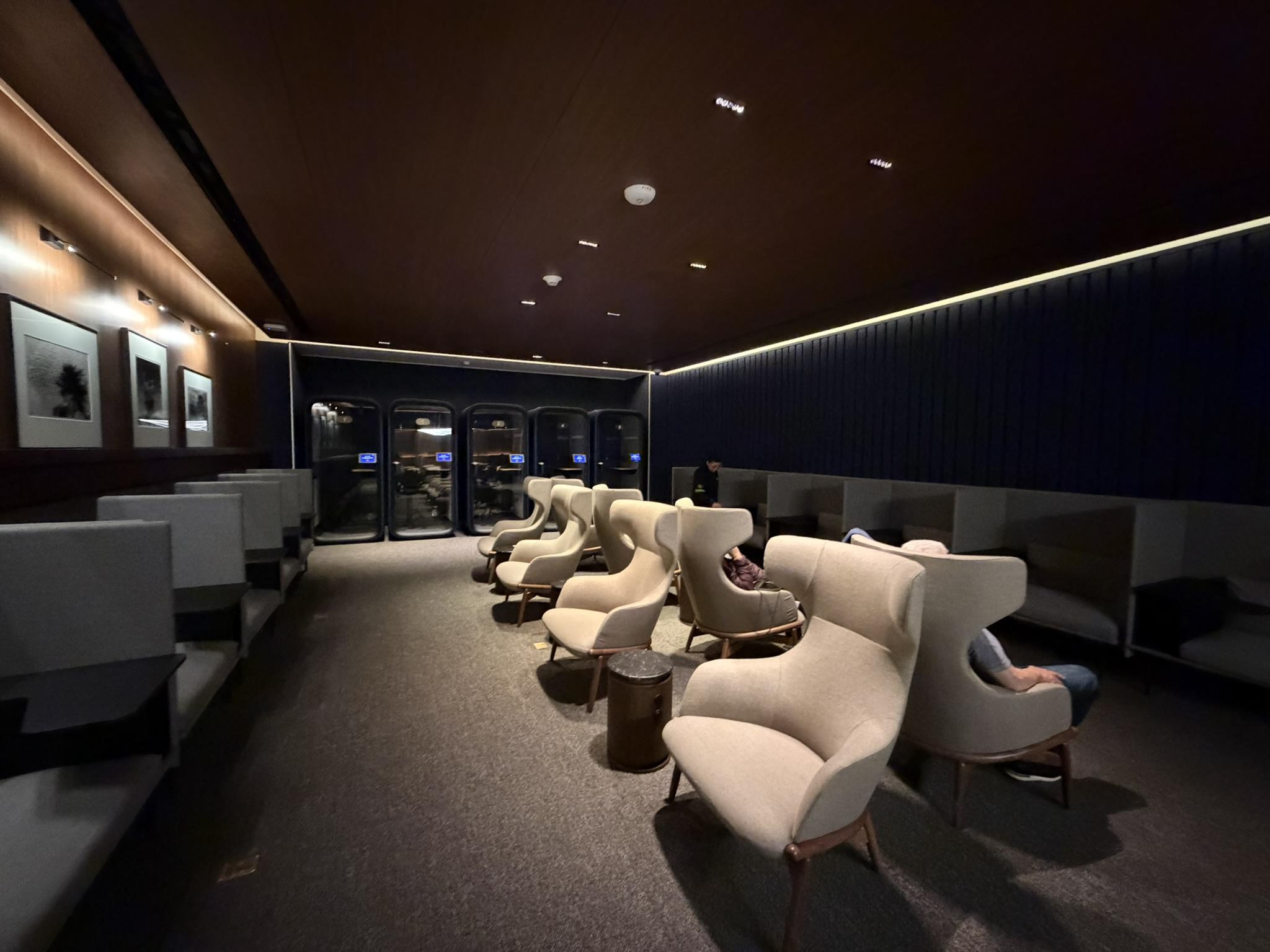

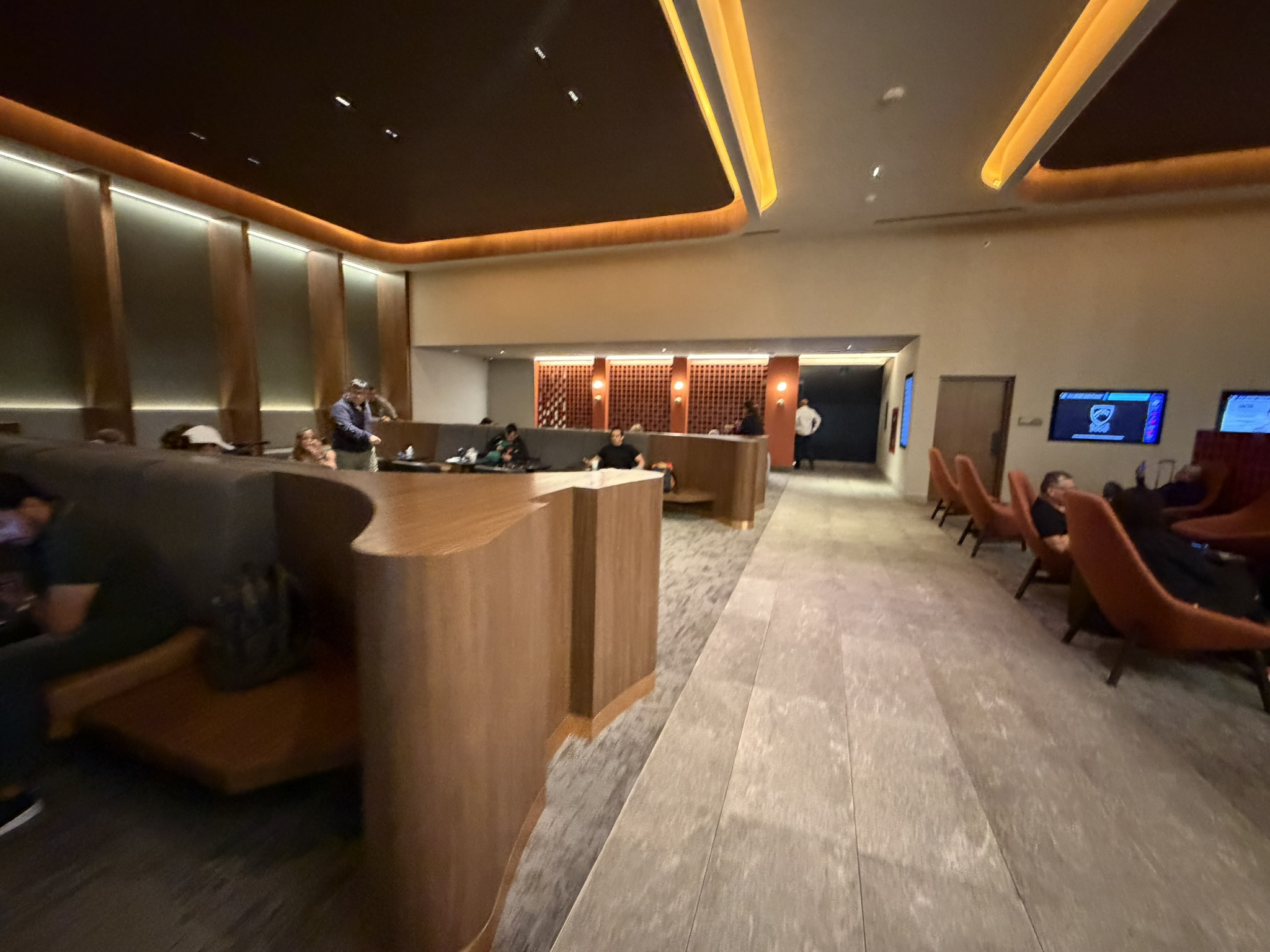

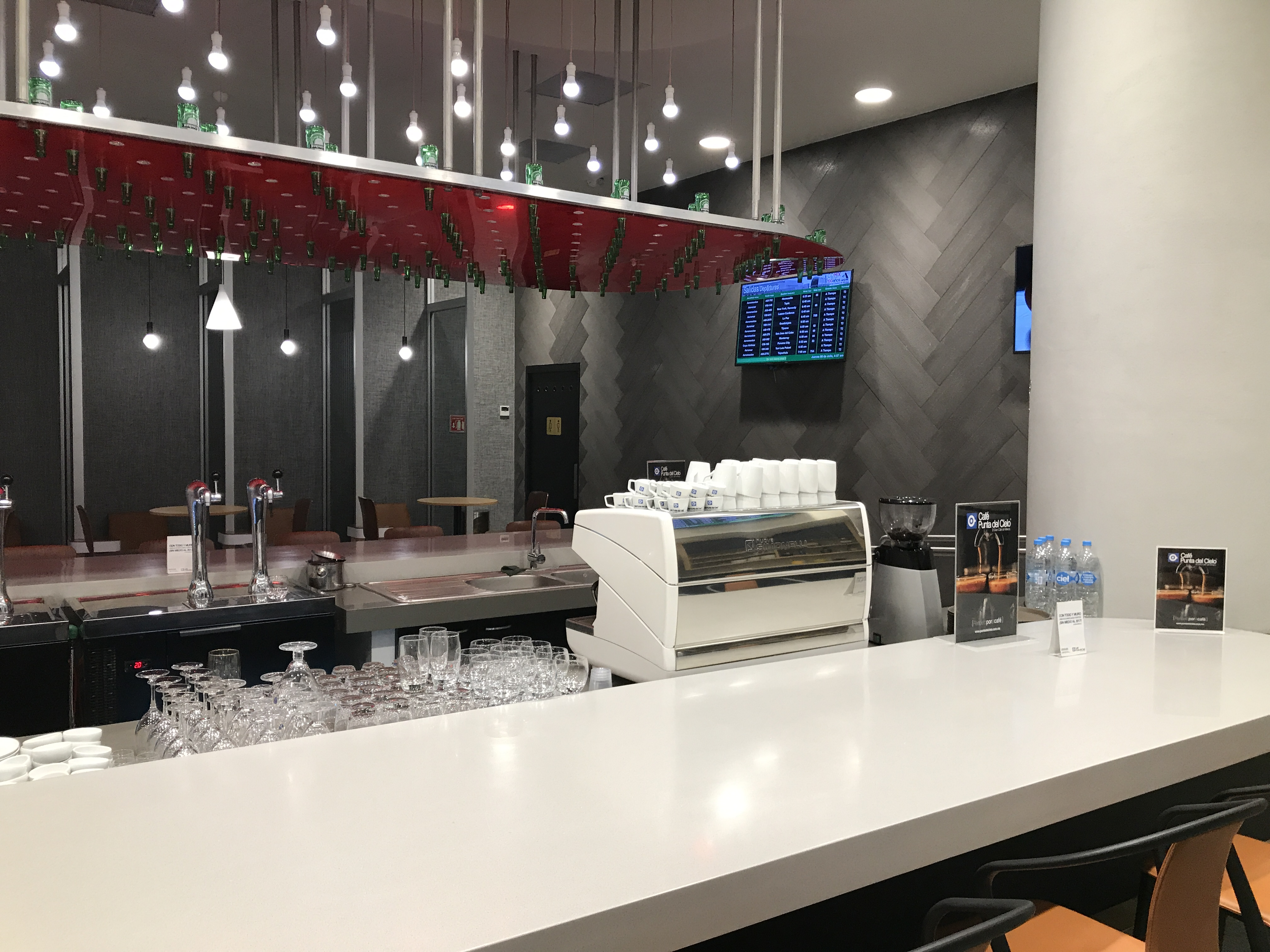

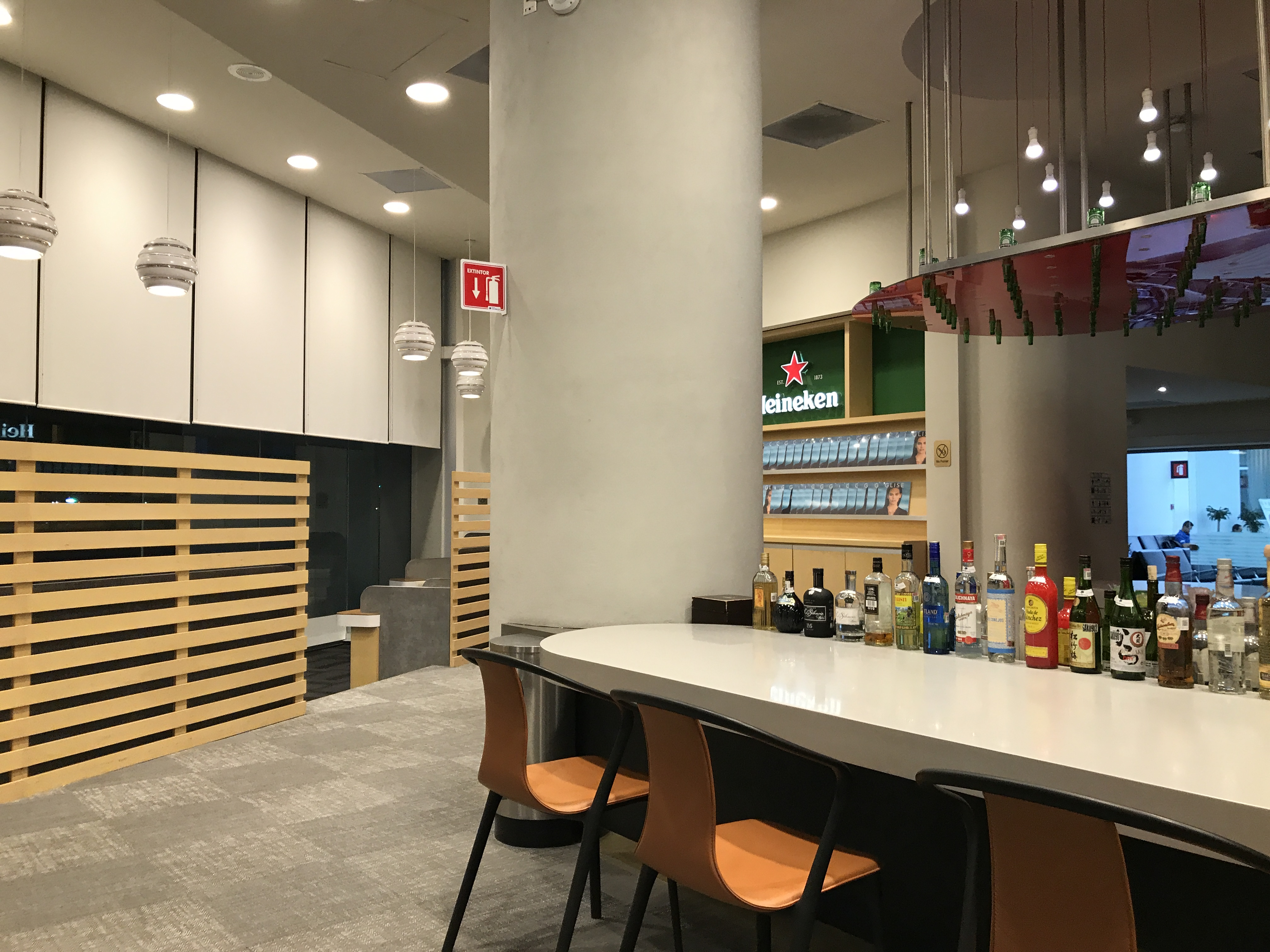

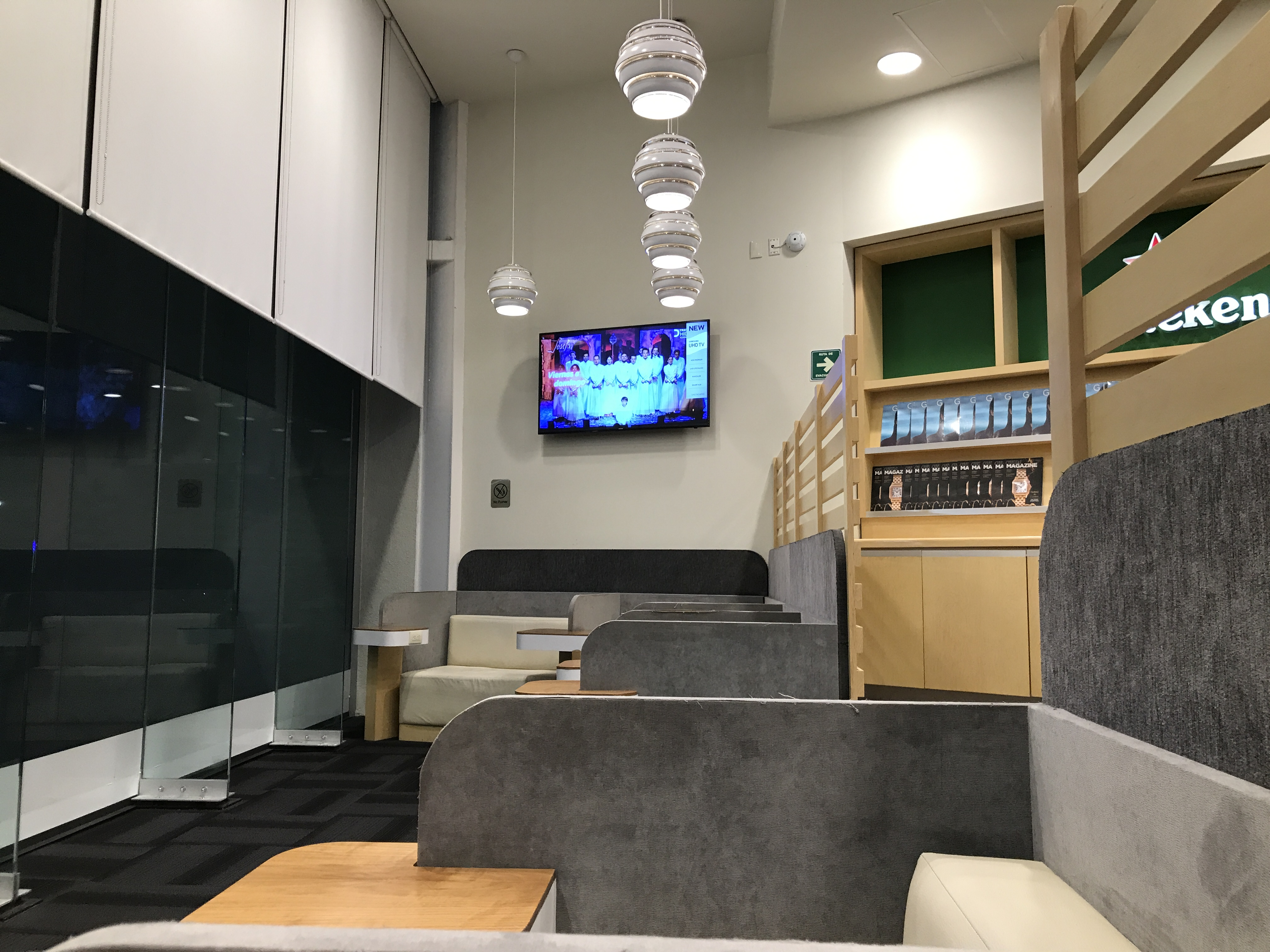

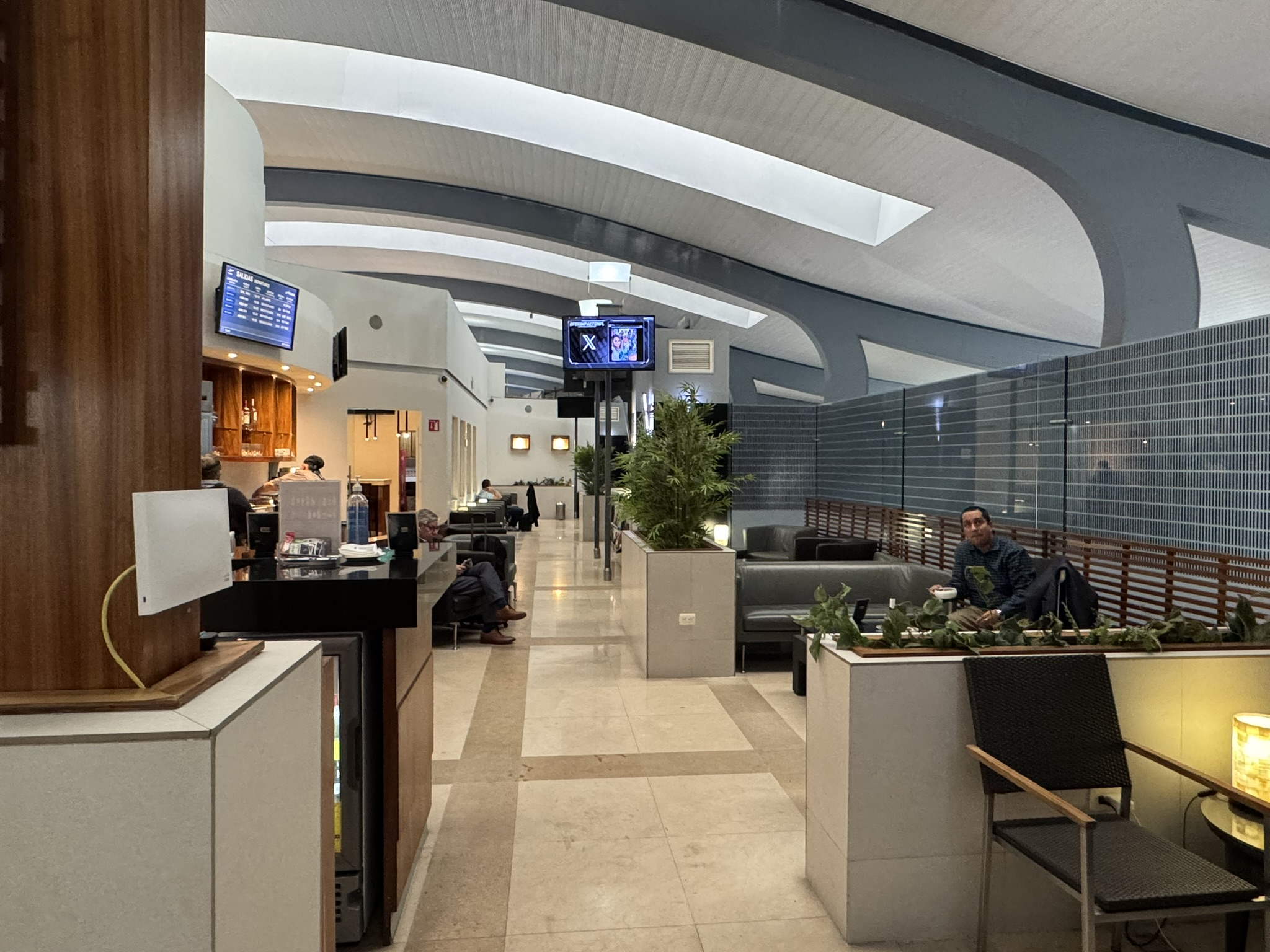

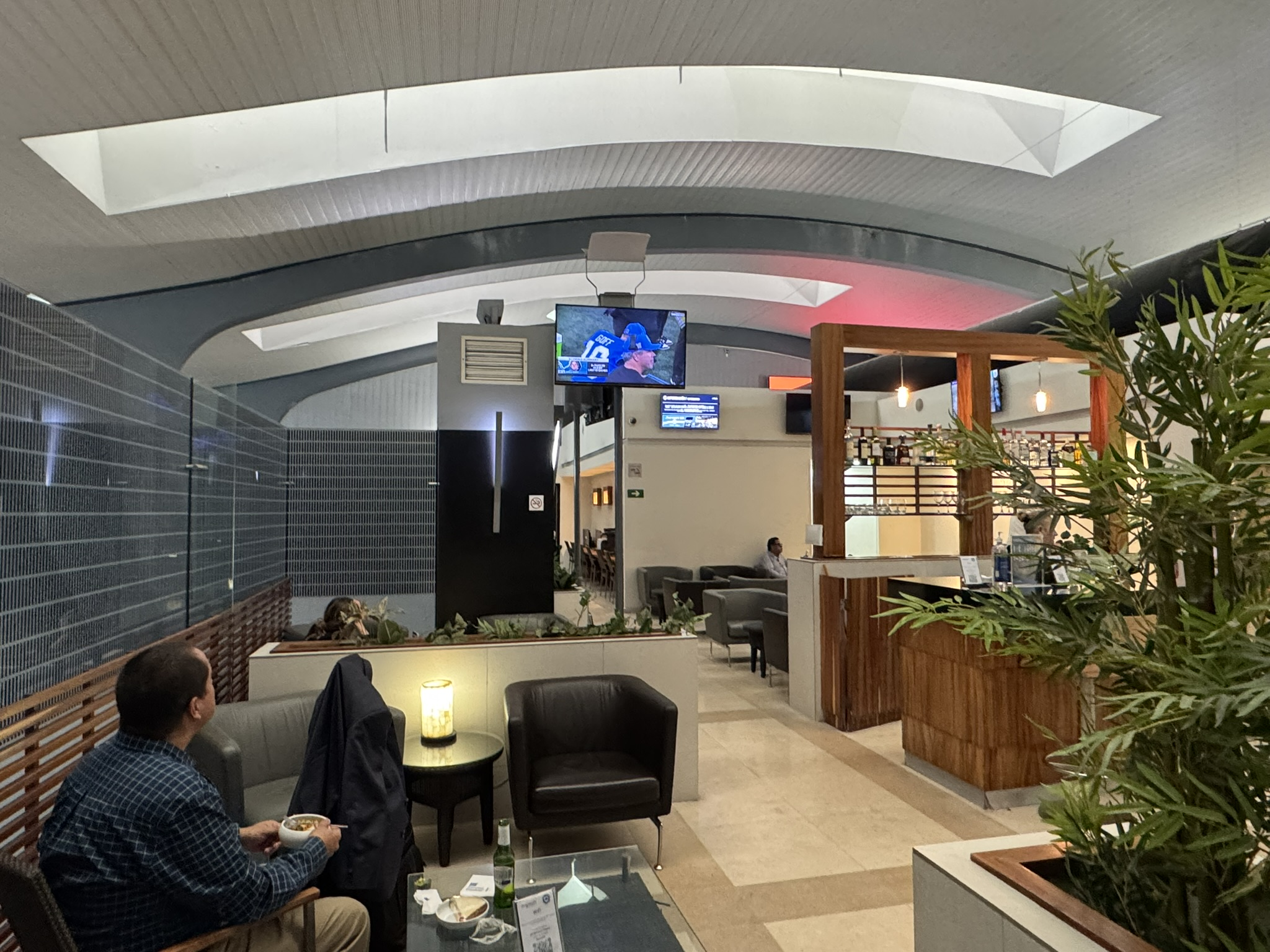
