= Asia Miles =

Loyalty program of Cathay Pacific airline

- Type: Loyalty program; Frequent-flyer program
- Owner: Cathay Pacific
- Introduced: February 1999
- Tagline: Life Rewarded
- Website: asiamiles.com

Asia Miles is a loyalty and frequent-flyer program launched by Cathay Pacific. Launched in February 1999, it allows members to earn miles by making different purchases with co-branded credit cards or on partnered flights, hotels, dining, financial services, retail, and technology products and services. Membership is free and open to individuals aged two or above.

Other than Asia Miles, Cathay Pacific also owns the Marco Polo Club, a four-tiered paid frequent-flyer program for Cathay Pacific and Oneworld member airlines flights. Marco Polo Club members are automatically enrolled as members of Asia Miles. As of 2020, the program has over 11 million members and over 800 programme partners worldwide.

== History ==
Asia Miles and its managing company, Cathay Pacific Loyalty Programmes Limited, was launched and founded in February 1999 in Hong Kong. The company was then renamed to Asia Miles Limited.

In January 2015, 4.7 million miles and gifts worth HK$100,000 were stolen from 121 accounts, four persons were arrested. Stronger online security measures were introduced and affected accounts were reimbursed.

In July 2019, Cathay Pacific took over low-cost carrier HK Express as a wholly owned subsidiary. The airline joined Asia Miles while closing down their own frequent-flyer program reward-U. All reward-U points are converted to Asia Miles, with a one-off conversion rate of 8 reward-U points to 1 Asia Miles.

In January 2020, Asia Miles changed their miles expiration rule from a time-based expiry system to activity-based system, where users can keep their miles by using the miles every 18 months.

== Partner airlines ==
Although Cathay Pacific is one of the founding members of the Oneworld alliance, Asia Miles has partnered with multiple airlines outside the alliance.

As of May 2026, other than Cathay Pacific and its subsidiary airline HK Express, partnered airlines include:

- Air Canada
- Air China
- Air New Zealand
- Alaska Airlines
- American Airlines
- Austrian Airlines
- Bangkok Airways
- British Airways
- Finnair
- Gulf Air
- Hawaiian Airlines
- Iberia
- Japan Airlines
- LATAM
- Lufthansa
- Malaysia Airlines
- Philippine Airlines
- Qantas
- Qatar Airways
- Royal Jordanian
- S7 Airlines
- Shenzhen Airlines
- SriLankan Airlines
- Swiss International Air Lines

== Other partnerships ==
Asia Miles has partnered with over 800 partners in dining, hotel, telecom, and retail sectors for earning and redeeming miles.

Co-branded credit cards are also launched since 2016 for earning miles. Asia Miles partnered with Standard Chartered for their first co-branded credit card in 2016 and American Express for the Hong Kong market. Further partnerships with banks such as China CITIC Bank, Cathay United Bank, and BNU were made for co-branded credit cards in outside markets such as mainland China, Taiwan, and Macau.

== Miles expiration ==
Originally, Asia Miles were earned under a time-limited system, set to expire after three years. This was changed in January 2020 to an activity-based system where miles will remain valid as long they are either earned or redeemed at least once every 18 months.
