= Blackout date =

Blackout dates are dates when travel rewards and other special discounts/promotions are not available. These dates typically fall on or around major holidays or other peak travel seasons. Time off requests from work may not be available during those times as well.

== About ==
Awards are given by airlines to attract potential fliers away from other carriers and keep them loyal by promising lower fare on future flights. Awards are tailored to create higher incentive to travel on days other than the blackout dates. On blackout dates, more travelers fly by necessity. Hence, a carrier can charge a higher price and yet fill its capacity, as the competition is also being fully booked on the blackout dates. A carrier can maximize profits by providing incentives to loyal but flexible travelers to plan and move their travel dates to lower traffic days, thereby allowing other fliers at premium priced tickets on the blackout dates. The other days are often graded so that the awards afford more on less preferred days.
