= SkyMiles =

Frequent-flyer program of Delta Air Lines

- Type: Frequent-flyer program
- Owner: Delta Air Lines
- Introduced: 1981; 45 years ago
- Website: SkyMiles

SkyMiles is the frequent-flyer program of Delta Air Lines that offers points (or "miles") to passengers traveling on most fare types, as well as to consumers who utilize Delta co-branded credit cards, which accumulate towards free awards such as airline tickets, business and first-class upgrades, and luxury products. Created in 1981 as the "Delta Air Lines Frequent Flyer Program", its name was changed to SkyMiles in 1995. Originally all airlines including Delta, only gave miles for airline travel and not credit card expenditures. Delta claims to have been the first major U.S. airline without mileage expiration, so travelers can redeem awards at their leisure, but others have since followed. The airline also has a separate SkyBonus program that provides small to mid-sized business owners with a way to earn points for trips taken by employees, good towards free flights, upgrades, Medallion status and other travel awards. It has been ranked fairly high according to some independent news outlets. In November 2024, Delta said that over the past 12 months, the amount of money charged to its co-branded American Express cards was almost 1% of the gross domestic product of the United States.

== Partnerships ==
In addition to its Delta Connection, Delta Shuttle and SkyTeam alliance partnerships, Delta offers frequent flyer partnerships with the following airlines:

- El Al Israel Airlines
- Hawaiian Airlines
- LATAM
- Skymark Airlines (SkyMiles Japan only)
- Thai AirAsia (SkyMiles Asia only)
- Virgin Atlantic
- WestJet

== Former partnerships ==
- Virgin Australia was formerly a SkyMiles partner but partnered with United Airlines MileagePlus in 2022.
- Royal Air Maroc was formerly a partner but joined the Oneworld airline alliance in 2020 and partnered with American Airlines AAdvantage.
- Alaska Airlines was formerly a partner prior to December 19, 2016.

In addition to the air miles, SkyMiles can be redeemed and even earned on SkyMiles cruises but that is actually a separate company. Miles may be used and accrued on Delta Vacations but that is also a separate company although Delta is the parent company.

== Medallion status ==
Delta offers four published tiers of elite status within the SkyMiles program. These are known as Medallion statuses and previously were achieved by flying a certain number of Medallion Qualification Miles (MQM) or Medallion Qualification Segments (MQS) between January 1 and December 31 each year. Beginning in 2014, a certain number of Medallion Qualification Dollars (MQD) was required for the US members in addition to either the MQM or the MQS requirement.

In September 2023, Delta announced a major change in how Medallion status would be earned beginning in 2024 (earning for status in 2025). MQM and MQS were abolished in favor of a simpler structure relying only on MQD to earn status, and new ways to earn MQD were created, including spending on the co-branded SkyMiles American Express credit cards.

Tier name	MQD required	Abbreviation
Silver Medallion	$5,000	FO
Gold Medallion	$10,000	GM
Platinum Medallion	$15,000	PM
Diamond Medallion	$28,000	DM

Medallion status entitles members to unlimited complimentary upgrades, subject to availability, on most published economy fares on Delta and certain Delta-designated codeshare flights in North America within or between the United States (excluding Hawaii) and Bermuda, Canada, Central and South America, the Caribbean and Mexico. In addition, preferred coach seating such as in the Economy Comfort section is set aside for medallion members for when first and business class upgrades are not available. Although not a published benefit, certain top tier members of the program have been transferred at Delta hubs by an automobile and chauffeur pick up service (see photograph). There is also a Delta 360 level of status which is awarded by invite only to their highest spending customers.

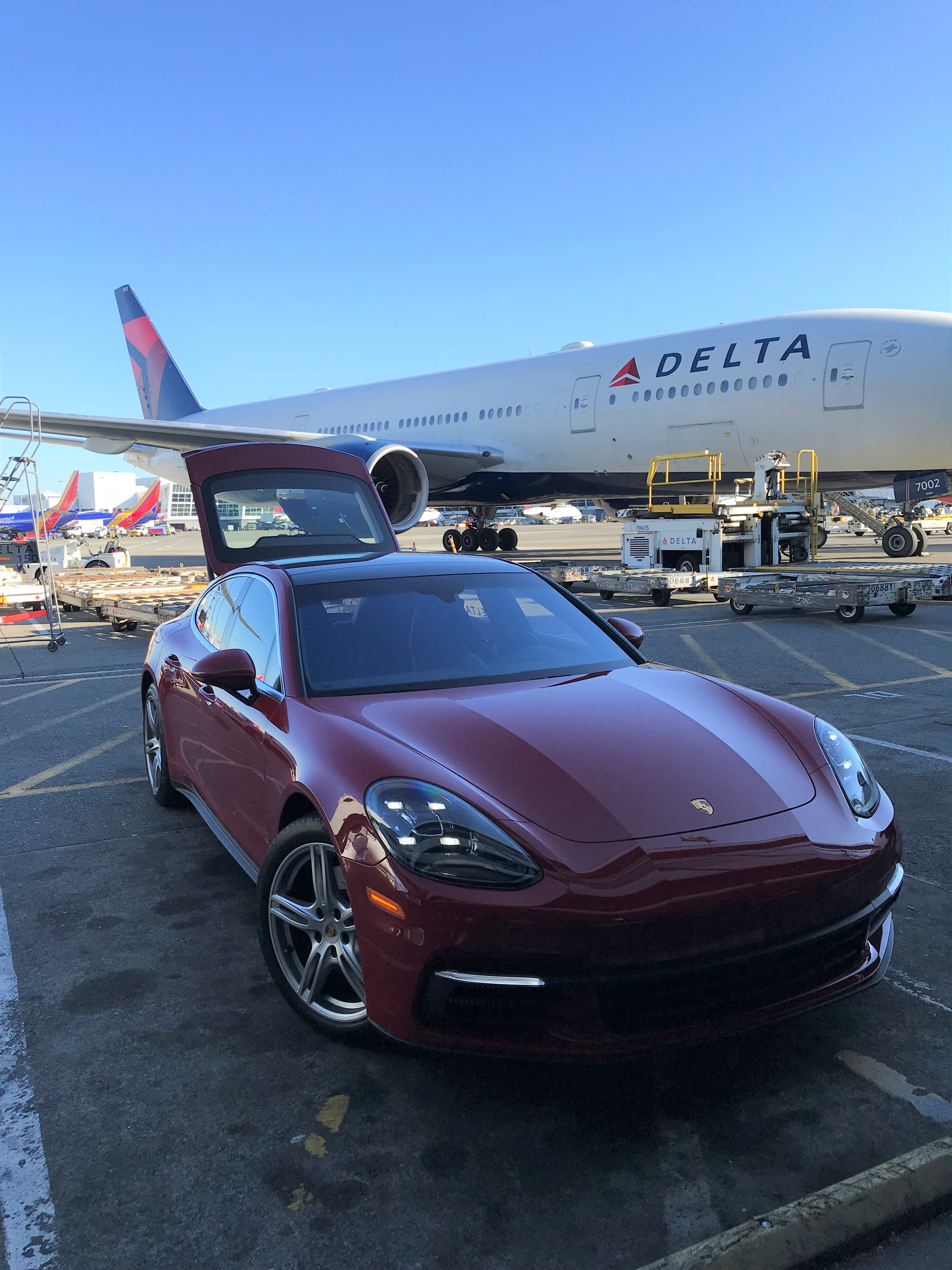
Porsche transfer, SeaTac Airport

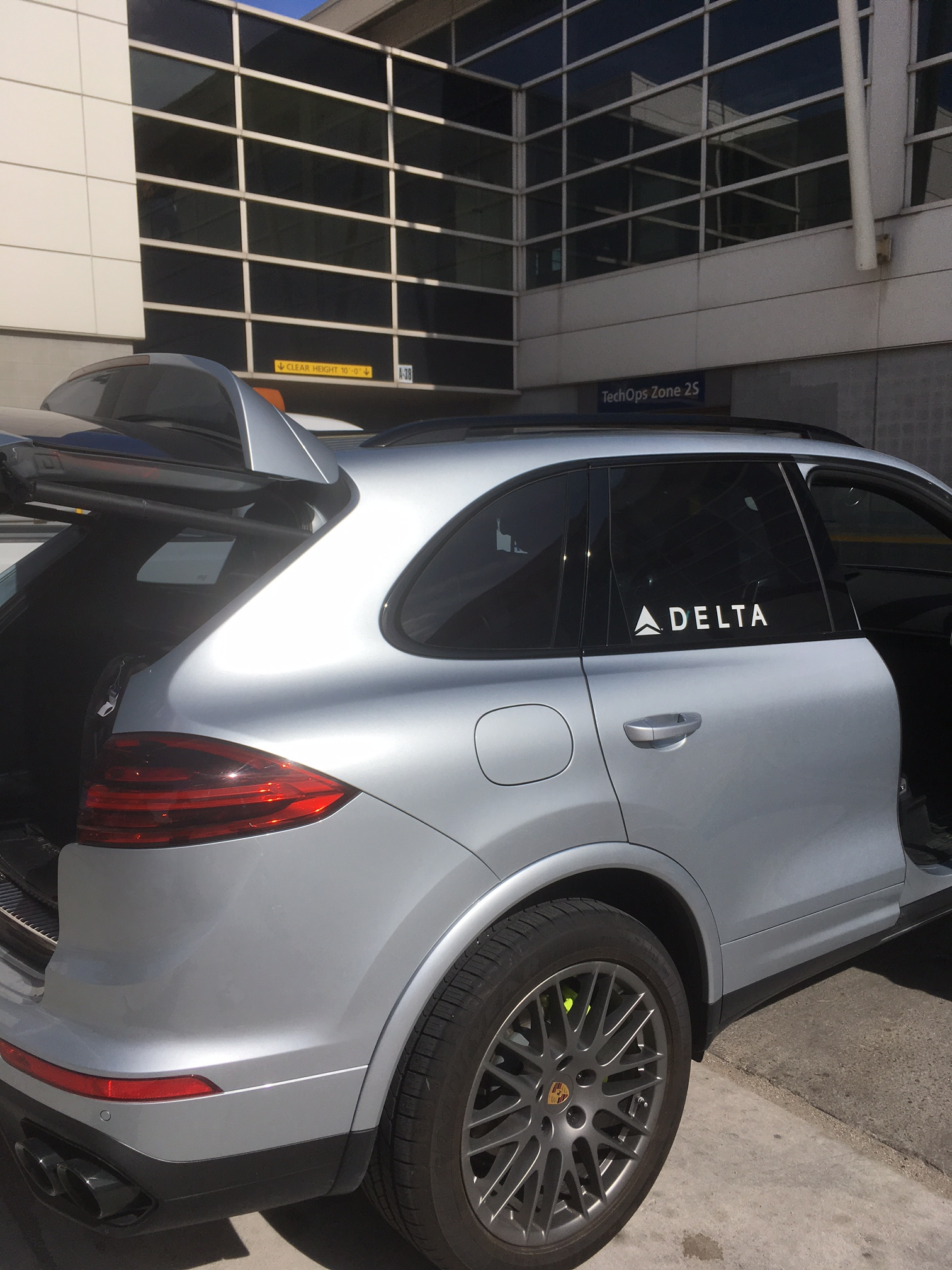
Porsche transfer, Detroit Airport for Delta Medallions

== History ==
In 1991, Delta acquired most of the assets of Pan Am Airways, and in November 1991 all members of the Pan Am frequent flyer program, WorldPass, were transferred to Delta's FF program, with their accumulated miles.

On July 31, 2008, Delta adjusted the cost of award tickets by implementing a four-tiered pricing system. For example, a domestic coach ticket cost 25,000, 32,500, 40,000, or 60,000 miles depending on availability.

On July 27, 2009, Delta introduced "Rollover" for Delta Medallion members. Flyers who reach an elite tier in a program year are able to roll over any extra Medallion Qualification Miles (MQMs) above their earned tier to the next year. For example, a passenger who earned 65,000 MQM in 2010 will earn Gold Medallion status for reaching 50,000 MQMs and will begin 2011 with 15,000 MQMs rolled over from the previous year.

On October 1, 2009, Northwest Airlines' former frequent flyer program, WorldPerks, officially became SkyMiles. This remained until the reservation system and website became Delta on January 31, 2010.

In January 2011, Delta eliminated its mileage expiration policy, making it at the time the only major U.S. carrier to have a non-expiring mileage policy. The announcement was made on 15 February 2011. (United Airlines matched their policy by 2019.)

In January 2013, Delta announced that beginning in the 2014 program year qualifying for elite Medallion status will require meeting spending thresholds. Each tier of elite status will now require a certain amount of Medallion Qualification Dollars (MQDs), in addition to the existing mileage or segment requirements. 1 MQD is earned for every dollar spent on most Delta issued airline tickets and on Delta marketed flights on other tickets. Only the base fare and carrier imposed fees earn MQDs. Government fees and taxes, as well as ancillary services such as baggage fees, change fees, etc., do not earn MQDs. Medallion members who spend at least $25,000 on a cobranded Delta American Express card annually are exempt from this new requirement. On September 26, 2017 Delta announced that the Credit Card waiver for Diamond Medallions only, was being increased to $250,000 which effectively eliminates it for many travelers.

In late February 2014 Delta announced significant changes to the SkyMiles program that shifts away from miles traveled to earning based on Medallion level and dollars spent, ceasing to be a frequent flyer program and becoming a spending program. Also announced was a new mileage redemption structure that will approve Award seat availability. The minimum number of miles earned per dollar is 5 and the maximum per dollar is 13. SkyMiles members that use one of Delta's branded credit cards from American Express will receive a bonus of 2-3 additional miles per dollar spent with Delta, depending on the tier of card used. It was also announced that the maximum number of miles that can be earned on any ticket is 75,000.

SkyMiles Program Status	Miles per dollar	Miles earned with Delta AmEx	Total miles per dollar
General SkyMiles member	5	2 - 3, depending on card	7 - 8
Silver Medallion	7	2 - 3, depending on card	9 - 10
Gold Medallion	8	2 - 3, depending on card	10 - 11
Platinum Medallion	9	2 - 3, depending on card	11 - 12
Diamond Medallion	11	2 - 3, depending on card	13 - 14

The updates to the 2015 SkyMiles program will not impact how one earns different Medallion levels from the 2014 MQD scheme. Partnerships with Airbnb have also been announced.

== COVID-19 pandemic effect ==
The Delta SkyMiles program was valued at $6.5 billion. The program was in effect mortgaged to keep the airline afloat in view of the catastrophic drop in demand for air travel due to the COVID-19 pandemic. Delta reported a 78% decline in miles redeemed in the first half of the 2020 year, resulting in a 60% drop in passenger revenue. However, frequent fliers continued to use their Delta SkyMiles credit cards, and cash from sales to American Express declined only 5% year-over-year to $1.9 billion. Overall Delta raised 9 billion in this cashflow issue. Most airlines, Delta included, instituted rollover of status and miles programs to keep its loyal customers in the wake of the pandemic.
