= AAdvantage =

Frequent-flyer program of American Airlines

- Type: Frequent-flyer program
- Owner: American Airlines
- Introduced: May 1, 1981; 45 years ago
- Website: aa.com/aadvantage

AAdvantage is the frequent-flyer program of American Airlines and Fiji Airways. Launched May 1, 1981, it was the second such loyalty program in the world (after the first at Texas International Airlines in 1979) and remains the largest, with more than 115 million members as of April, 2021.

Miles accumulated in the program allow members to redeem tickets, upgrade service class, or obtain free or discounted car rentals, hotel stays, merchandise, or other products and services through partners. The most active members, based on the amount and price of travel booked, are designated AAdvantage Gold, AAdvantage Platinum, AAdvantage Platinum Pro, and AAdvantage Executive Platinum elite members, with privileges such as separate check-in, priority upgrade and standby processing, or free upgrades. They also receive similar privileges from AA's partner airlines, particularly those in oneworld. AAdvantage co-branded credit cards are also available and offer other benefits. These cards are issued by Citi in the United States.

AAdvantage allows one-way redemption, starting at 7,500 miles.

== History ==
Increased competition following the 1978 Airline Deregulation Act prompted airline marketing professionals to develop ways to reward repeat customers and build brand loyalty. The first idea at American, a special "loyalty fare", was modified and expanded to offer free first-class tickets and upgrades to first class for companions, or discounted coach tickets. Membership was seeded by searching American's SABRE computer reservations system for recurring phone numbers. The 130,000 most frequent flyers, plus an additional 60,000 members of the airline's Admirals Club were pre-enrolled and sent letters with their new account numbers. The name was selected by American's advertising agency and is consistent with other American Airlines programs featuring "AA" in the name and logo. The original logo was designed by Massimo Vignelli.

Less than a week later, rival United Airlines launched its MileagePlus program; other airlines followed in the ensuing months and years. The rapid appearance of competition changed the nature of the program, and as airlines began to compete on the features of their frequent flyer programs, AAdvantage liberalized its rules, established partnerships with hotel and rental car agencies, and offered promotions such as extra free beverages. In 1982 AAdvantage also became the first program to cooperate with an international carrier; members could accrue and redeem miles on British Airways flights to Europe.

In 1988, major airlines, including American, offered triple miles. This led to increases in the number of miles needed for awards. During this time, miles, which originally had no expiration, began to have an expiration of three years, later reduced to 18 months, where an account would be closed if there was no activity during this time.

In 2005 American Airlines joined other major U.S. carriers in introducing an online shopping portal allowing shoppers to earn AAdvantage miles when shopping online.

In 2016, AAdvantage began crediting miles based on the amount of the airfare, not the distance traveled. This change was accompanied by increases in miles needed for an award.

In 2022, American Airlines simplified the method of keeping track of earning miles for AAdvantage status. It was formerly required to keep track of three metrics: EQM (Elite Qualifying Miles), EQS (Elite Qualifying Segments), and EQD (Elite Qualifying Dollars). The update replaced the three metrics with a single metric: Loyalty Points. Besides flying, members can use their AAdvantage credit card for purchases.

Starting April 1, 2025, Fiji Airways fully adapts the AAdvantage program as it becomes the 14th full member of the oneworld alliance.

== Membership tiers ==
There are five membership tiers in AAdvantage: standard, Gold, Platinum, Platinum Pro and Executive Platinum.

Gold status requires 40,000 Loyalty Points. Gold status confers priority boarding, expedited security, complimentary same-day standby, discounted Admirals Club membership, and complimentary upgrades on domestic flights. All fares receive one free checked bag. Gold status also confers a 40% mileage bonus to all flown segments, a 500-mile minimum on each segment, complimentary auto-requested upgrades on flights 500 miles or less, complimentary preferred seats, Main Cabin Extra seats (complimentary at check-in), and a 24-hour upgrade window. Gold status provides oneworld Ruby status when flying a oneworld partner airline.

Platinum status requires 75,000 Loyalty Points. Platinum status confers priority boarding, expedited security, priority baggage delivery, complimentary same-day standby, discounted Admirals Club membership, and complimentary upgrades on domestic flights. All fares receive two free checked bags. Platinum status also confers a 60% mileage bonus to all flown segments, a 500-mile minimum on each segment, complimentary preferred seats, complimentary Main Cabin Extra seats, and a 48-hour upgrade window. It also confers a greater standing on upgrade lists and a special phone line. Platinum status provides oneworld Sapphire status when flying a oneworld partner airline.

Platinum Pro status requires 125,000 Loyalty Points. Platinum Pro status confers priority boarding, expedited security, priority baggage delivery, complimentary same-day standby, discounted Admirals Club membership, and unlimited, auto-requested complimentary upgrades on flights regardless of the number of miles. All fares receive three free checked bags. Platinum status also confers an 80% mileage bonus to all flown segments, a 500-mile minimum on each segment, complimentary preferred seats, complimentary Main Cabin Extra seats, and a 72-hour upgrade window for flights. It also confers a greater standing on upgrade lists and a special phone line. Platinum Pro status provides oneworld Emerald status when flying a oneworld partner airline.

Executive Platinum status requires 200,000 Loyalty Points. Executive Platinum status confers priority boarding, expedited security, priority baggage delivery, complimentary same-day standby, complimentary same-day flight change, discounted Admirals Club membership, unlimited, auto-requested complimentary upgrades on flights regardless of the number of miles, waived ticket service change, guaranteed availability in the Main Cabin, waitlist priority for purchased First or Business Class, complimentary alcoholic beverage and snack in Main Cabin. All fares receive three free checked bags. Executive Platinum status also confers a 120% mileage bonus to all flown segments, a 500-mile minimum on each segment, complimentary preferred seats, complimentary Main Cabin Extra seats, and a 100-hour upgrade window for flights. It also confers a greater standing on upgrade lists and a special phone line. Executive Platinum status provides oneworld Emerald status when flying a oneworld partner airline.

Individuals who accumulate 1,000,000 miles earned on American receive lifetime Gold status. Individuals who accumulate 2,000,000 miles earned on American receive lifetime Platinum status. Beginning in 2025, individuals who accumulate 4,000,000 and 5,000,000 miles earned on American receive lifetime Platinum Pro & Executive Platinum status, respectively.

Beginning January 1, 2016, elite qualifying points were removed from AAdvantage's tier qualification system, while elite qualifying miles and flown segments will continue to be used to determine tier status and qualification. Beginning January 1, 2017, elite qualifying dollars were added to AAdvantage's tier qualification status. Beginning 2022, elite qualifying miles/segments/dollars were replaced with Loyalty Points.

== Partnerships ==
In addition to its oneworld and American Eagle partnerships, American Airlines offers frequent flier partnerships with the following airlines:

Airlines

- Aer Lingus
- Air Tahiti Nui
- Cape Air
- China Southern Airlines
- Etihad Airways
- GOL Airlines
- Hawaiian Airlines
- IndiGo
- JetSMART

== Miles expiration ==
When American first started their frequent-flyer program, miles credited to AAdvantage members’ accounts never expired. In 1989, American implemented an expiration policy where miles would expire if there wasn't any account activity over a three-year period. In 2012, American revised their policy by lowering the required activity timeframe to 18 months. Miles that were not previously subject to expiration were given a 25% bonus before adopting the new 18-month expiration policy.

In March 2022, American again revised their expiration policy by increasing the timeframe for required activity to 24 months. Miles in members' accounts who are under 21 years of age are exempt from the account activity requirement. Expired miles cannot be used for award travel. To reactivate previously earned miles, AAdvantage plan members can pay a fee ranging from $200–$600. Of the three main legacy carriers in the United States, American is the only one that continues to maintain an expiration policy; Delta and United both relinquished such policies in 2011 and 2019, respectively.

== Miles redemption ==
AAdvantage miles can be used to redeem for flights, upgrades, premium seat selections, club (lounge) memberships, rental cars, hotels, and others.

When redeeming AAdvantage miles for flights operated by American Airlines, its regional brand American Eagle, and select airline partners, the miles needed are generally dynamically priced -- where the price of a ticket is determined by factors such as current demand level and the cash price of the ticket -- with a minimum "start at" price based on the region of travel and cabin class.

Otherwise, when redeeming for flights operated by other partners, the miles are generally determined by a fixed "award chart" based on the region(s) of travel, cabin class, and season of flight. These awards are subject to the availability released by the operating airline.
