= Frequent-flyer program =

Airline loyalty program

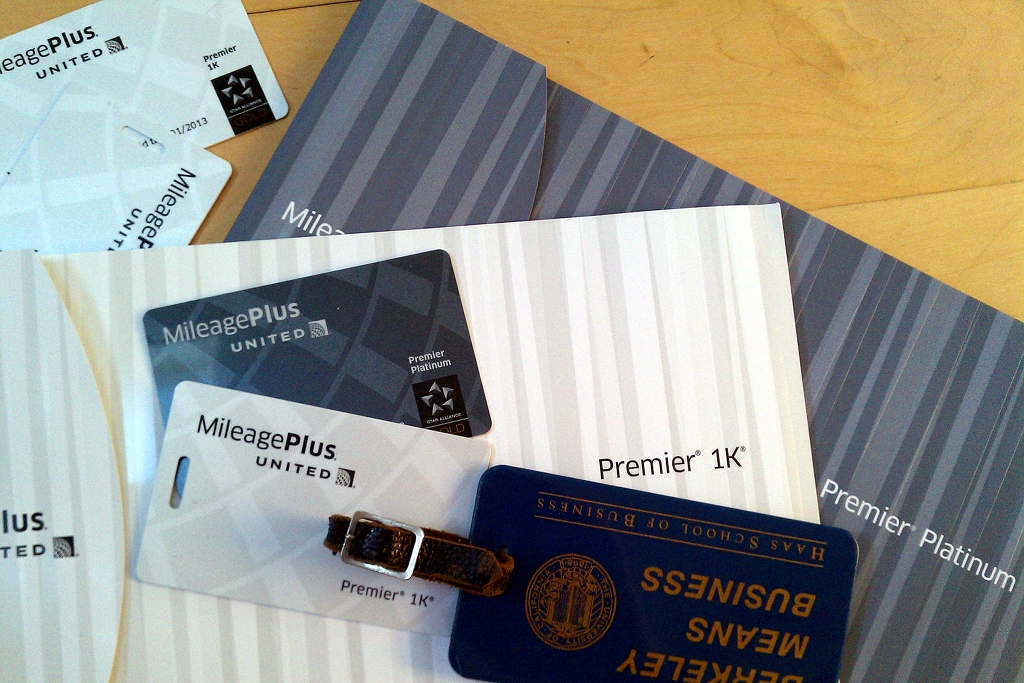
United MileagePlus cards

A frequent-flyer program (FFP) is a loyalty program offered by an airline.

Many airlines have frequent-flyer programs designed to encourage airline customers enrolled in the program to accumulate points (also called miles, kilometres, or segments) which may then be redeemed for air travel or other rewards. Points earned under FFPs may be based on the class of fare, distance flown on that airline or its partners, or the amount paid. There are other ways to earn points. For example, in recent years, more points have been earned by using co-branded credit and debit cards than by air travel. Another way to earn points is spending money at associated retail outlets, car hire companies, hotels, or other associated businesses. Points can be redeemed for air travel, other goods or services, or for increased benefits, such as travel class upgrades, airport lounge access, fast-track access, or priority bookings.

Frequent-flyer programs can be seen as a certain type of virtual currency, one with unidirectional flow of money to purchase points, but no exchange back into money.

FFPs have become an important part of airlines' economic models, with for example United and Delta both able to earn more than $1 billion in 2015 because of their FFP.

== History ==
Although United Airlines had tracked customers as far back as the 1950s, the first modern frequent-flyer program was created in 1972 by Western Direct Marketing for United. It gave plaques and promotional materials to members. In 1979, Texas International Airlines created the first frequent-flyer program that used mileage tracking to give 'rewards' to its passengers, while in 1980 Western Airlines created its Travel Bank, which ultimately became part of Delta Air Lines' program upon their merger in 1987. American Airlines' AAdvantage program launched in 1981 as a modification of a never-realized concept from 1979 that would have given special fares to frequent customers. It was quickly followed later that year by programs from United Airlines (Mileage Plus), Delta (Delta Air Lines Frequent Flyer Program, which later changed to SkyMiles), Continental Airlines (OnePass), Air Canada (Aeroplan), and in 1982 from British Airways (Executive Club).

Frequent-flyer programs have grown since. In 2005, 163 million people were enrolled in frequent flyer programs from over 130 airlines. By then, 14 trillion frequent-flyer points had been accumulated by people worldwide, for a value of 700 billion US dollars. When United Airlines filed for bankruptcy in 2002, its frequent flyer program was its only money-making business. Tom Stuker is the world's most frequent flier having logged over 21 million miles with United.

== Accrual ==
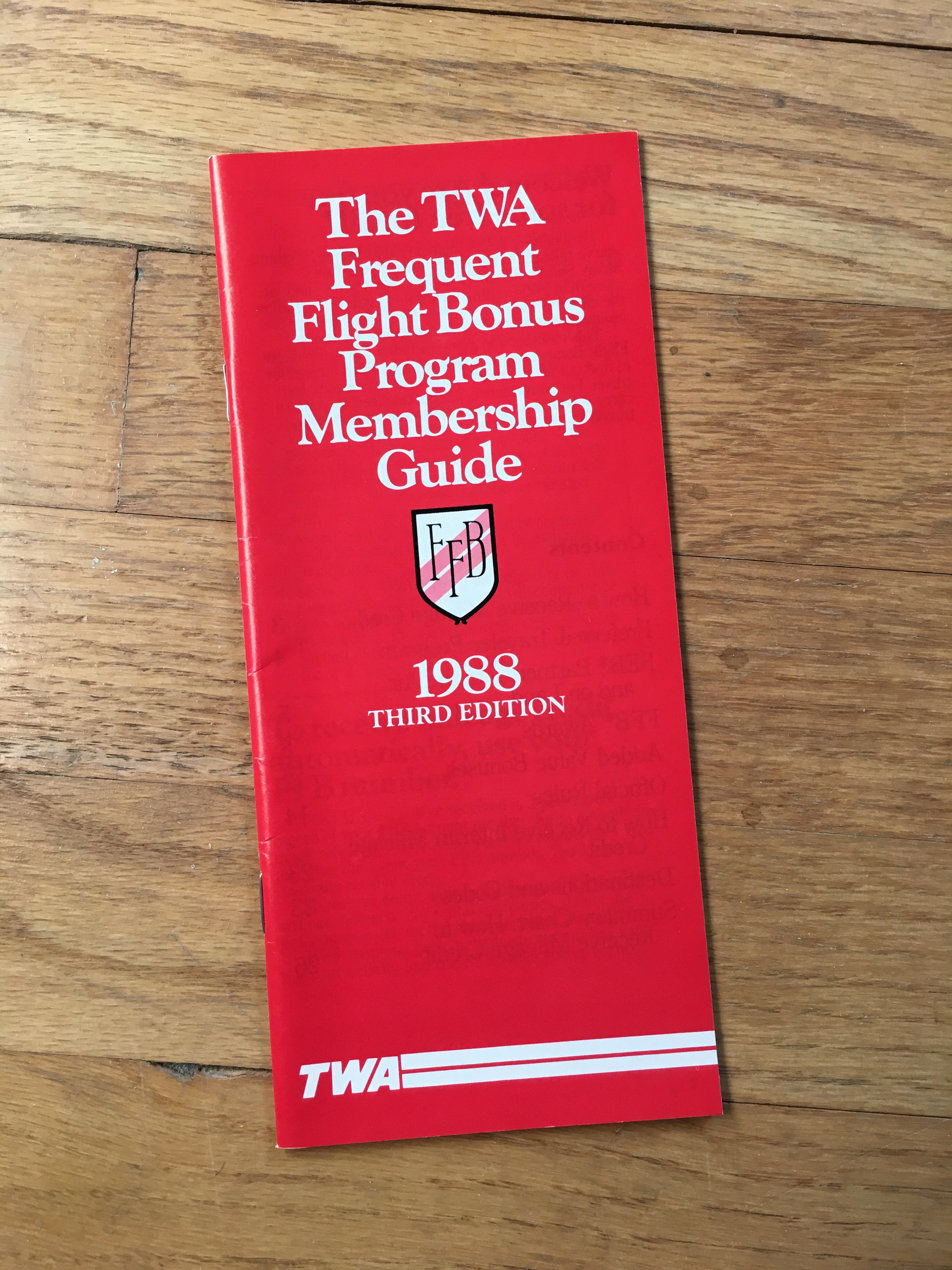
Frequent flyer program rules can be complex; this 1988 pamphlet from TWA's program ran to 27 pages

=== Flying ===
Most larger airlines around the world have frequent flyer programs; each has a program name, and policies and restrictions regarding joining, accumulating, and redeeming points.

The primary method of obtaining points in a frequent-flyer program until recent years was to fly with the associated airline. Paying expenses using an airline-sponsored credit card, even those charged to an employer, can rack up frequent flyer points. Most systems reward travellers with a specific number of points based on the distance travelled (such as 1 point per mile flown), although systems vary. Many discount airlines, rather than awarding points per mile, award points for flight segments in lieu of distance or the amount paid. For example, a number of airlines in Europe offer a fixed number of points for domestic or intra-European flights regardless of the distance (but varied according to class of travel). With the introduction of airline alliances and code-share flights, frequent-flyer programs are often extended to allow benefits to be used across partner airlines.

==== Bonus points ====
Most, if not all, programs award bonus earnings to premium-cabin passengers and to their elite-status members based on tier status; earning an extra 25%-100% of miles flown are common bonuses. While these bonus points may not count toward ascension to (or retention of) elite status, they count toward the member's total balance for normal redemption purposes.

==== Minimum credit guarantee ====
Some programs award a full 500 points (or a similar minimum credit guarantee) for non-stop flights spanning less than 500 miles. An airline's program can either award this guarantee to all members regardless of elite status, or they can reserve this privilege only for their elite members.

=== Credit card purchases ===
Many credit card companies partner with airlines to offer a co-branded credit card or the ability to transfer points in their loyalty program to an airline's program. Large sign-up bonuses and other incentives are common. Accruing points via credit cards bonuses and spending allows infrequent travellers to benefit from the frequent flyer program.

With a non-affiliated travel rewards credit card a cardmember can buy a positive-space ticket considered "revenue" class, which can earn the passenger points with the airline flown.

=== Other purchases ===
Frequent-flyer programs may offer points through other means, such as purchasing food or merchandise sold by an affiliated company. American engineer David Phillips gained attention in 2000 for purchasing $3,140 of Healthy Choice pudding to earn him 1,253,000 AAdvantage miles.

== Elite status ==
Occasionally, airlines may offer double elite-qualifying mile (EQM) promotions, which speeds up a member's status ascension (or retention) by reducing flight mileage requirements.

Some carriers also require frequent flyers to spend a set amount of money on tickets before they are eligible for elite status. This is in addition to the miles-flown requirements that are already in place. Delta switched to revenue-based elite status requirements in January 2014, United in March 2015, with American Airlines the last of the three US legacy carriers to switch on August 1, 2016. This has led to some frequent flyers devaluing those programs over others, as the changing model can be less rewarding to frequent flyers. British Airways retained distance- and cabin-based tier points until 1 April 2025, when it moved to awarding tier points on the amount spent.

== Redemption ==
After accumulating a certain number of points, members then use these points to obtain airline tickets. However, points only pay for the base fare, with the member still responsible for the payment of mandatory taxes and fees.

=== Flights ===
Although a controversial topic and a source of frustration among frequent flyers, award flights are still the primary commodity purchased by members using points. While alliances and partnerships have facilitated the redemption process for some programs, award seat availability is still subject to blackout dates and seasonal fluctuations, as airlines utilize statistics, yield management, and capacity-control formulas to determine the number of seats to allocate for award booking.

This lack of availability has since been alleviated by non-airline rewards programs, such as certain credit cards (see above) and other corporate programs (Expedia Rewards, Marriott) by allowing a member to use points to search for and purchase revenue tickets as if using cash.

=== Products and services ===
Depending on an airline's program, members can also redeem points toward cabin upgrades, hotel stays, car rentals, and purchase of various retail items. On American Airlines' AAdvantage program for example, it is possible to pay for a complete vacation package solely with points.

=== Value of points ===
The value of frequent-flyer points varies depending on how they are redeemed. When used for economy-class travel based on discounted fares, the estimated value is typically between one and two cents per point.

A 2014 economics PhD thesis from Monash University analyzed the cash-equivalent value of loyalty points, the influence of frequent-flyer programs (FFPs) on consumer behavior, and related taxation issues. Unlike much previous research, this study used data from an actual FFP. It found that in 2010, the estimated cash value of a point ranged from AU$0.0066 to AU$0.0084, excluding the value of status-related benefits. Points earned per flight represented a discount on airfare of approximately 3.3% for low-status members, 3.96% for mid-tier members, and 4.63% for high-status members.

A survey of over 3,300 members of the program indicated that many leisure and business travelers were willing to pay more to fly with the airline due to their FFP membership. This willingness to pay, known as the FFP premium, averaged around 8%, with differences observed between traveler types. Based on this premium, the estimated point value ranged from AU$0.0108 to AU$0.0153, depending on membership status.

Airlines typically assign a much lower value to points in their financial statements, reportedly less than one one-thousandth of a cent per point. However, the monetary value of points is also reflected in the ability of some programs to donate points to charitable organizations.

== Devaluation ==
Frequent-flyer currencies are subject to devaluation, a reduction in the reward that a given number of points will buy. It may take the form of higher points prices for rewards, a lower earning rate, higher cash surcharges on reward bookings, or higher thresholds for gaining or retaining elite status. Program terms typically reserve to the airline the right to change the program at any time: the AAdvantage conditions, for example, permit changes "even if the changes affect the value of AAdvantage Rewards already accumulated". A 2024 analysis in the Vanderbilt Law Review characterized the programs as financial instruments whose issuers control both the supply of the currency and its redemption value, and described a shift by United States carriers away from published award charts toward dynamic pricing tied to demand and cash fares.

In September 2023 Delta Air Lines announced that SkyMiles elite status would be determined by spending alone rather than partly by distance flown, and that Delta Sky Club access for holders of co-branded credit cards would be capped. After criticism from members, chief executive Ed Bastian said there was "no question we probably went too far", and in October 2023 Delta lowered the announced spending thresholds and eased the lounge restrictions. British Airways renamed its Executive Club "The British Airways Club" from 1 April 2025 and began awarding tier points on money spent rather than on distance flown and cabin booked, with annual thresholds of £7,500 for Silver and £20,000 for Gold status; after criticism that this favored high-spending corporate travelers over leisure passengers, it extended a bonus tier-point offer and restored routes to status based on the number of flights taken.

In Australia, Qantas Frequent Flyer raised the points needed for premium-cabin rewards and upgrades in a 2019 overhaul that also reduced some international economy reward prices and carrier charges. In April 2024 it introduced Classic Plus, a dynamically priced option offering greater availability at points prices linked to the cash fare and generally higher than those of its fixed-price Classic Rewards. A further increase, announced in January 2025 and effective from 5 August 2025, was the first since 2019; it raised most reward and upgrade prices by about 5 to 20% and increased the cash component of some international premium rewards, taking a one-way Sydney–London economy reward from 55,200 to 63,500 points. Qantas simultaneously released 400,000 additional Classic Reward seats and raised domestic earning rates by up to 25%. In September 2025 the specialist publication Australian Frequent Flyer reported that Qantas had cut the value of Classic Plus redemptions in international premium cabins from about 1.5 to 1.25 cents per point without notifying members; its editor said the program "can and will just change the 'value' of its Classic Plus redemptions at any time". Status changes announced in February 2026 allowed status credits to be rolled over and earned through everyday spending, while raising the credits needed to retain some tiers. Virgin Australia's Velocity Frequent Flyer program widened its reward-seat pricing bands from October 2024, raising the maximum points required.

Devaluation has attracted regulatory and legislative attention. The Australian Competition and Consumer Commission recommended in December 2019 that schemes contemplating "a unilateral reduction in either the earn rate or redemptive value of points" give members prominent advance notice and a genuine opportunity to redeem their balances, and that frequent flyer schemes disclose routes, seasons or classes of travel on which reward seats are unavailable. An Australian Senate select committee recommended in October 2023 that consumer protection reforms address the "devaluation of loyalty programs". In the United States, the Department of Transportation and the Consumer Financial Protection Bureau held a joint hearing on airline and credit card rewards in May 2024, and in September 2024 the department opened an inquiry into the programs of American, Delta, Southwest and United, examining devaluations of earned rewards over the previous six years, dynamic pricing of redemptions and fees charged to redeem or transfer points. Legislation introduced that month by Senator Dick Durbin would have required a year's notice of devaluing changes and barred points from expiring.

== Accounting and regulatory issues ==
The frequent flyer points accumulated through business trips are a desirable employee benefit, which can encourage unnecessary travel within organisations to accumulate them and lead to superfluous personal trips.

Business travelers typically accrue the valuable points in their own names, rather than the names of the companies that paid for the travel. This has raised concerns that the company is providing a tax-free benefit (point-based awards) to employees, or that employees have misappropriated value that belongs to the company, or even that the rewards acts as a kind of bribe to encourage travellers to choose one particular airline or travel unnecessarily. Most companies consider the miles earned by their employees to be a valuable personal perk that in part compensates for the daily grind of frequent business travel, though some governmental organizations have attempted to prevent their employees from accumulating miles on official travel.

Although it has long been recognized that FFP rewards earned on employer-funded business flights should be subject to either income or fringe-benefit taxation, this is currently not taking place in the vast majority of countries - a notable exception however being Germany. One of the main arguments against the implementation of taxation is the lack of a monetary tax base. It can however be argued that since the cash-equivalent value of loyalty currency can be reasonably estimated with public data, this value is appropriate as a tax base. Hurdles preventing the taxation of FFP rewards are generally less related to the technical issue of valuation, but have more to do with legal constraints (e.g. "who owns the points") and often a lack of political will (e.g. "who would lose out due to taxation"). Australian and German public servants are not permitted to redeem points accrued from official travel for private purposes. The Australian example occurred in the 1990s when Qantas and the now-defunct Ansett Australia competed for the Australian federal government travel contract; this was put forward as a system requirement for the competing companies in order to win the contract.

In the US, the General Services Administration has regulated, "frequent traveler benefits earned [by federal employees] in connection with official travel, [which] may be used only for official travel, see 41 C.F.R. § 301-1.6(f)." Frequent flyer program contracts are not generally regulated.

=== Competition ===
These programs have been studied as anti-competitive practices: in 1989, M. Tretheway found competition prevented an airline to unilaterally end its program, but the regulatory body could end all; in 1999, S. Storm observed loyalty programs were forbidden in Denmark until 1992, instated then because Danish airlines were disadvantaged, as governments can forbid these programs at industry players request and the World Trade Organization could ban all programs.

In the U.S. in 1989, Braniff wished for an end to unfair competition from frequent-flyer programs. Precedent exists for ending frequent-flyer programs. In 2002, Norway banned domestic loyalty programs to promote airline competition. In 2005, the Modernization Minister asked the competition authority to consider extending the Norwegian ban on frequent flyer miles to include all of Scandinavia. The country lifted the ban in 2013 when the competitive situation changed.

== Flight shame ==
Frequent-flyer programs have been receiving scrutiny because of the prevalence and rapid growth of air travel, in terms of both the frequency that individuals fly and the tendency toward longer distance travel. In 2011, S. Cohen observed both air travel and concern over its climate impacts were growing, balanced by technology and physical resources, self and external regulation and social norms including stigmatisation of excessive air travel. In 2009, Stefan Gössling pointed out the conflict caused by air travel growth in a carbon-constrained world, with a minority of hypermobile individuals responsible for a large share of air travel.

== Mileage runs ==
A "mileage run" is an airline trip designed and taken solely to gain maximum frequent-flyer miles, points, or elite status usually at lowest cost. If a traveler (or traveller) has already achieved some sort of elite status, then that traveler will earn bonus award miles or points on top of their actual flight miles or points. Depending on the program, that traveler will reach their goal sooner if the miles they accrue are elite qualifying miles. A mileage run may allow a traveler to (re-)qualify for a beneficial elite level, which requires a minimum number of miles to qualify. Some airlines have changed their frequent flyer rules to award miles based on ticket expense rather than absolute distance traveled, which may remove the incentive for mileage runs.

== Status challenge ==
A status challenge can be an often non-publicized offer to accrue a certain amount of flying within a certain very short timeframe (usually 90 days), to earn elite status. The higher status may or may not be given immediately if it can be seen that qualifying travel (particularly travel that is non-refundable) has already been booked before the challenge was offered, otherwise higher status will be conferred once the challenge is officially completed. In some instances, a fee for a challenge may also be charged. Status challenges are employed by other types of establishments, as well, such as casinos and hotels.

== Status match ==
Some airlines will match status with that of a competitor upon application, usually to airlines outside of any alliance that the airline used to match status with belongs to. This enables travellers to switch their travel more easily from one carrier to another (e.g., when the traveller's employer switches carriers due to a new travel contract's being signed). It does so by maintaining equivalent elite benefits with the new airline, without the need for time to pass while the traveller earns the benefits; this also has the side effect of retaining elite benefits with the previous airline, in order that one does not have to be given up for the other to allow for a more gradual transition. Status matches are employed by other types of establishments, as well, such as casinos, cruise lines, hotels, and rental car companies.

== See also ==
- FlyerTalk
- Revenue passenger mile
- Scrip
