= Robin Hayes (businessman) =

British businessman (born 1966)

Robin N. Hayes
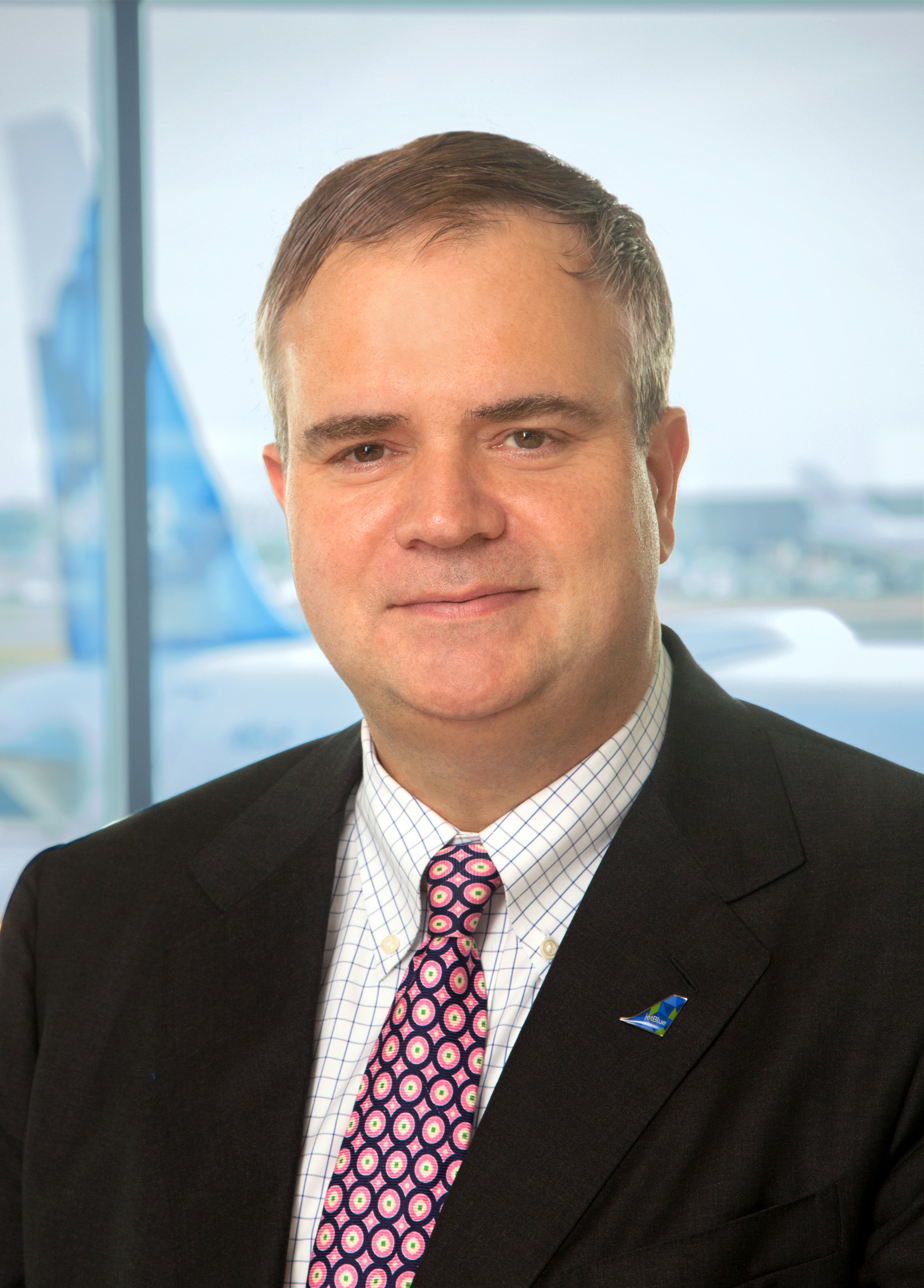
- Born: 1966 (age 59–60)
- Education: University of Bath
- Employers: Airbus; JetBlue Airways Corp.
- Title: Chairman and Chief Executive Officer of Airbus in North America; Chief Executive Officer of JetBlue Airways Corp.
- Predecessor: David Barger
- Successor: Joanna Geraghty
- Board member of: KeyBank
- Children: 3
- Website: Airbus Bio

Robin N. Hayes (born 1966) is a British-American business executive who is chairman and chief executive officer of Airbus Americas, Inc., the North American subsidiary of Airbus. He was chief executive officer of JetBlue Airways from 2015 to 2024.

== Education ==
Robin Hayes was born in 1966 and grew up in London, United Kingdom, as the oldest of three children. He did not take his first flight until he was 18 years old, when he flew to Greece with his then-girlfriend. Hayes earned a Bachelor of Science (BSc) in electrical and electronic engineering in 1988 from the University of Bath in the UK. He received a master's degree in engineering (MEng) from the same school in 1989.

== Career ==
After university, his first job in the aviation industry was delivering duty-free items to passengers at Logan International Airport in Boston for a summer. Employees would earn a $50 prize for perfect attendance, but Hayes called in sick on his last day. He then designed military cockpit avionic systems for a year before starting a job at British Airways working as a gate attendant and at the ticket counter in Glasgow, Scotland.

Hayes then joined British Airways, ultimately rising to the position of Executive Vice President for The Americas over nineteen years at the airline. He also was General Manager for Europe, Latin America and the Caribbean.

=== JetBlue ===
Hayes became jetBlue's chief commercial officer in August 2008. In 2012, Hayes became a U.S. citizen, a requirement for becoming CEO of a U.S. airline. He was named the airline's president on 1 January 2014. Among the initiatives that Hayes spearheaded was JetBlue Mint, a premium cabin offering on select transcontinental flights.

Hayes became CEO on 16 February 2015, upon the resignation of JetBlue founder and CEO David Barger due to concern from Wall Street analysts about the airline's efforts to increase revenues. Under Hayes, JetBlue announced a codeshare alliance with American Airlines in July 2020. Another major move during Hayes's tenure is the failed purchase of discount airline Spirit Airlines. JetBlue agreed in July 2022 to purchase Spirit for $3.8 billion, which would create the fifth largest carrier in the United States.

In December 2022, Hayes received a two-year extension to his contract, extending his term as CEO until at least 1 September 2025.

On 8 January 2024, JetBlue announced that Hayes will step down as CEO on 12 February 2024.

=== Airbus ===
On 22 April 2024, Airbus announced that Robin Hayes would succeed C. Jeffrey Knittel as chairman and chief executive officer of Airbus Americas, Inc., following Knittel’s retirement on 3 June 2024.

== Personal life ==
Hayes met his wife Sue while both were executives at British Airways' London headquarters. The couple lives in Connecticut and have three children.

Hayes is a member of the board of directors of American bank KeyBank and the airline industry's trade association International Air Transport Association.
