= JetBlue flight attendant incident =

Aircraft incident involving disruptive flight attendant

Coordinates: 40.656°N 73.786°W

JetBlue Flight 1052
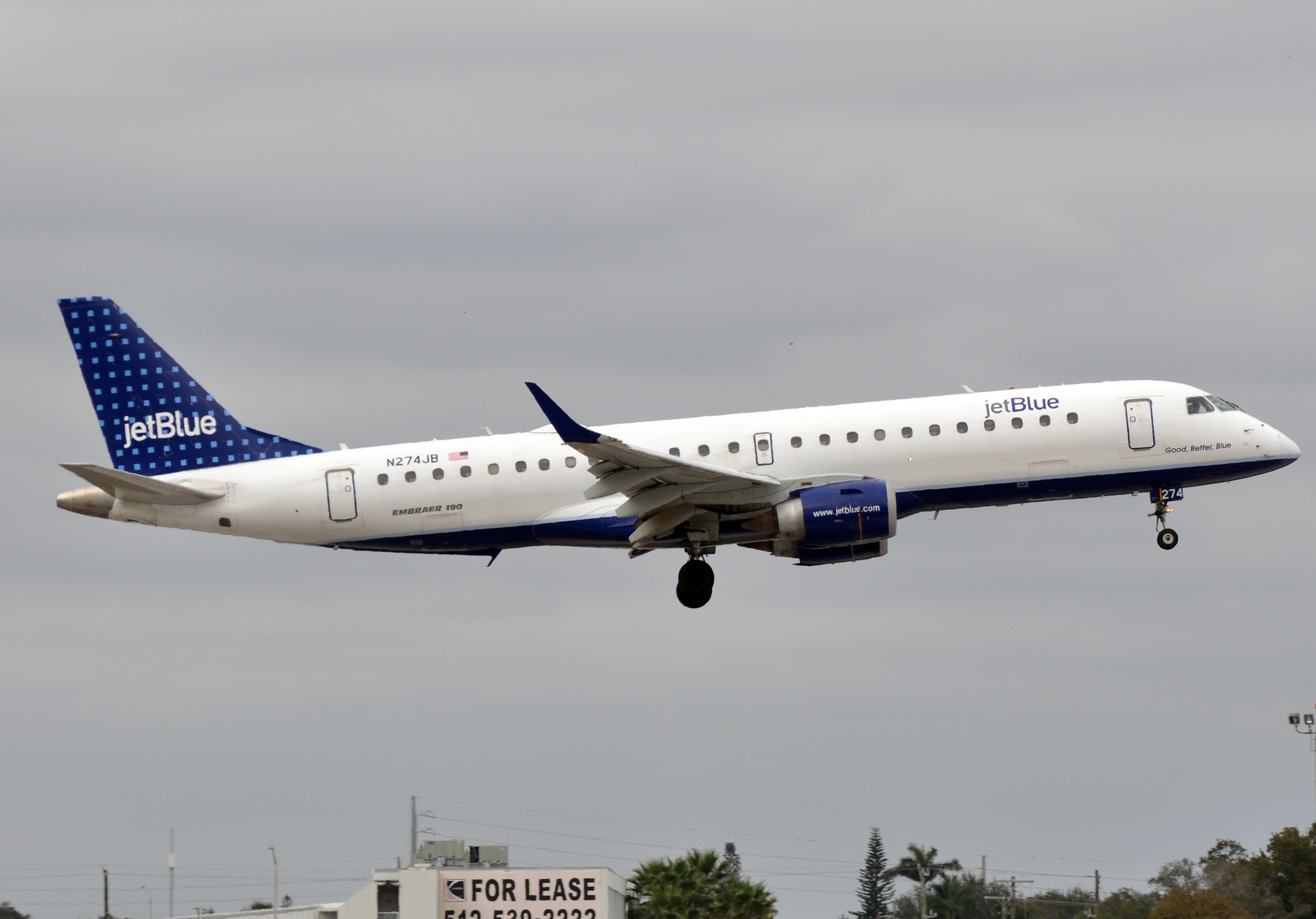
- N274JB, the aircraft involved in the incident, photographed in January 2012

Incident
- Date: August 9, 2010
- Summary: Flight attendant altercation
- Site: John F. Kennedy International Airport, New York City

Aircraft
- Aircraft type: Embraer 190
- Aircraft name: Good, Better, Blue
- Operator: JetBlue Airways
- IATA flight No.: B61052
- ICAO flight No.: JBU1052
- Call sign: JETBLUE 1052
- Registration: N274JB
- Flight origin: Pittsburgh International Airport
- Destination: John F. Kennedy International Airport
- Occupants: 104
- Passengers: 100
- Crew: 4
- Fatalities: 0
- Survivors: 104

The JetBlue flight attendant incident occurred after JetBlue Flight 1052, from Pittsburgh to New York City on August 9, 2010, had landed at John F. Kennedy International Airport. A veteran flight attendant announced over the plane's public address system that he had been abused by a passenger and was quitting his job. He then grabbed and drank two beers and exited the plane by deploying the evacuation slide and sliding down it. The flight attendant claimed to have been injured by a passenger when he instructed her to sit down. His account of the event was not corroborated by others who claimed he hip-checked the woman.

== Incident ==
The flight attendant claimed that as JetBlue Flight 1052 taxied to a stop, a passenger stood up too early to retrieve her bag from the overhead compartment. She had been instructed repeatedly to remain seated. Despite this, he alleged, the passenger continued to remove the bag, and in doing so, she hit him in the head with the bag. When asked for an apology, the passenger allegedly responded with profanity. Port Authority Police concluded the flight attendant's initial account of a confrontation was fabricated. As early as August 13, investigators stated none of the dozens of passengers interviewed about the incident had corroborated his account.

A passenger reported that the flight attendant went on the plane's public address system and used his own profanities. He stated "I've been in this business 20 years. And that's it, I'm done." He then activated the emergency inflatable slide, exited the plane, and threw his tie on the tarmac before calmly walking to his Jeep.

Later that day, the flight attendant was arrested and charged with criminal mischief, reckless endangerment, and criminal trespass, to which he pleaded not guilty.

The district attorney pursuing the case said the flight attendant's actions were serious and could have killed or grievously injured anyone below the inflatable plastic chute. The Federal Aviation Administration (FAA), which certifies flight attendants, also investigated the incident. "Clearly, you're not supposed to pop the slides unless there's an emergency in the aircraft", said FAA spokesman Les Dorr. "We're continuing to investigate circumstances as well as any violations that may have occurred."

Reversing his original declaration ("I'm done."), the flight attendant indicated that he had not resigned, and sought to continue his employment by JetBlue. On August 12, he announced through his attorney that he would seek to return. At some point prior to September 5, the flight attendant formally resigned from JetBlue, although it is disputed if he was terminated by JetBlue prior to this.

=== Flight attendant's account of the events ===
The flight attendant's attorney has said that at the beginning of the flight, two female passengers had argued over the allocated bag space in the overhead bin. Once the plane landed, the dispute flared again when one of the women was told that a bag she had checked at the gate would not be immediately available. She then began to curse at the flight attendant. According to a Port Authority police officer quoted by the Wall Street Journal, no passenger or other crew member has corroborated this account.

== Analysis ==
Aviation experts and officials said that the incident exposed gaps in the aviation security system that could be exploited by someone seeking to cause real harm. For instance, after deplaning, the flight attendant was able to run through secure zones near planes while towing two carry-on bags. Some Port Authority police officials have criticized JetBlue for waiting 25 minutes before informing them of the incident. Some of the delay may be attributed to the fact that police radios do not work inside JetBlue's terminal. The Port Authority also criticized JetBlue for refusing to give them its flight manifest or videos of the incident. JetBlue has since handed over the flight manifest, but not the videos.

Bill Briggs of MSNBC said that the incident "launched a fresh examination of the two-faced persona all flight attendants are asked to master: grinning snack server one moment, frowning rules enforcer the next." Corey Caldwell, a spokesperson for the Association of Flight Attendants, said that while the association did not condone the flight attendant's behavior, it held concerns for flight attendants working longer hours for lower wages and for passengers carrying heavier bags due to fees on checked luggage. Sarah Keagle, a flight attendant who writes in the blog The Flying Pinto, said "Hopefully," the incident "was an 'Aha' moment for the traveling public." Keagle argued that while flight attendants like dealing with most passengers, a few disruptive passengers make the job difficult. Kathy Sweeney, a flight attendant who worked for America West Airlines, said in an AOL Original article that "While I don't agree with [the flight attendant] endangering passengers by 'blowing a slide' (let alone forcing JetBlue to pay about $10k to repack the slide), I can see how he snapped."

Rich Lowry wrote that the incident represents "the value our culture puts on emotional expressiveness" drawing contrasts between Captain Chesley Sullenberger's "unadorned professionalism" when he landed US Airways Flight 1549 in the Hudson River with no deaths, and the flight attendant's "tantrum" which escalated into "an act of reckless endangerment".

Froma Harrop said in her syndicated column that if there had been an unruly passenger, the flight attendant should not have abandoned his fellow flight crew. She says that even if his story is true, he was just an angry person acting out and not a case of "a working-class hero".

Retired airline pilot Arthur G. Schoppaul has said that the flight attendant's actions cost the airline a lot of money; these expenses would have included not only the cost of replacing the deployed chute and the costs associated with delayed passengers, but also costs associated with the disrupted utilization of the airplane down the line. He also doubted that passengers and crew would feel safe flying with a crew member "who is subject to an act of hysteria". It has been claimed that as a result of his action other flights might have been affected.

== JetBlue's response ==
JetBlue first discussed the incident with a post on JetBlue's blog, BlueTales. In a memo to employees, they have said that, "If [the flight attendant]'s story proves to be accurate, and even if there was a precipitating event that motivated his behavior, that still doesn't excuse his actions." The memo stated, "Let me just say this: JetBlue will always seek to prosecute people who physically harm or threaten to harm a crew member or customer. Period." In their view the most "distressing aspect" of the coverage was that press reports did not take the chute deployment seriously enough. "Slides deploy extremely quickly, with enough force to kill a person", the memo read. "Slides can be as dangerous as a gun." The memo further stated that "It is an insult to all aviation professionals to have this particular element of the story treated without the seriousness it deserves."

The memo also explained the apparent 25-minute delay in informing the police of the incident: "It isn't our policy to call police on a slide deployment; our policy is to treat the event as an emergency and implement our emergency response plan. The moment we confirmed the safety of the Customers and Crew—both on board and on the ground—it became a matter for the police."

JetBlue suspended the flight attendant and initially refused to comment on his future with the company. Later, the company indicated that he was no longer among its employees.

JetBlue CEO David Barger has said of the flight attendant, "[He] is not a hero in my book", Barger called his actions "an egregious act" that defied safety. He also said that the incident was costly to the airline, as it delayed other JetBlue flights and the plane had to be taken out of service for "a couple of hours". He added that his own flight had been delayed and said that he was "disheartened to think that so many people would call him [the flight attendant] a hero." In an interview with SunSentinel.com Dave Barger said that the attendant's actions reflected poorly on him, and that his actions did not represent the values and practices of the company. Barger went on to describe the attendant as a coward. He was also criticized for throwing his tie onto the tarmac since it could have blown into the path of a taxiing plane and been sucked into an engine.

== Aftermath ==
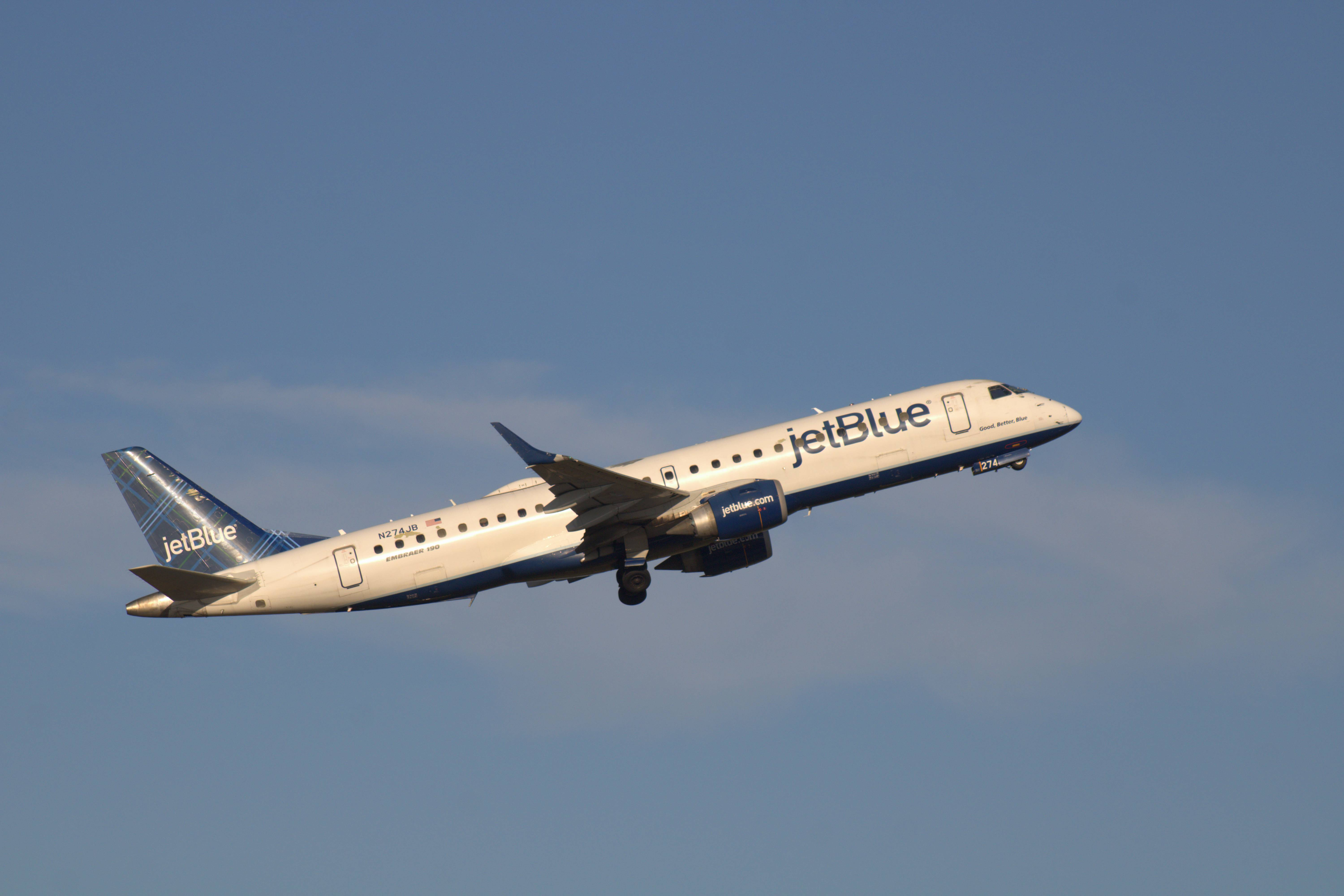
N274JB, the aircraft involved, now seen in April 2024

The flight attendant agreed to a plea bargain in October 2010 in which he would plead guilty to one of the lesser charges, accept a status of probation, receive drug testing, undergo counseling, and avoid prison. He would also pay JetBlue $10,000 for restitution. On October 19, 2011, he withdrew his guilty plea to a felony charge of attempted second-degree criminal mischief and would serve a year of probation on a misdemeanor charge of attempted fourth-degree criminal mischief. He also appeared in a taped message at the Rally to Restore Sanity and/or Fear, apologizing for his actions.

The flight attendant also later blamed his actions on stress related to HIV-related health problems, as well as his terminally ill mother's health issues. In 2017 he likened the whole occurrence to an out-of-body experience: "In some respects, it was like, 'Oh my God, I'm doing this.' And then the next thing I know, I was on the tarmac", he recalled to The Washington Post. "I remember standing on the tarmac on the sun and it was just so warm. I thought, 'Ahh, I can exhale. But how did this happen?'"

Since completing community service, the flight attendant has moved to Los Angeles and kept a low public profile. "It's a before and after. My life was completely transformed, for better or for worse, after that date," he recalled. "I mean, it wasn't the smartest thing I've ever done but it sure felt great ... I just hit like a crescendo of frustration." He has since been able to recover from his drug and alcohol addictions. Despite some job interviews, he has had difficulty getting hired because of his history, which he does not hold against prospective employers. "If I'm going in for some sort of a customer service position, I'm kind of like your worst nightmare."

The flight attendant told the newspaper he had nevertheless been doing some work with disabled people. The Post was occasioned to speak with him after a Twitter employee leaving the company briefly deactivated Donald Trump's account, an action compared on social media to his departure from JetBlue. He advised that person to prepare for the backlash but not to take it personally nor regret it. "Don't second-guess. It is what it is. Be present and you'll be fine ... And I would say I'd like to buy this guy two beers."

== See also ==
- List of air rage incidents
- Workplace stress
- Air rage
