= TrueBlue =

Frequent-flyer program of JetBlue

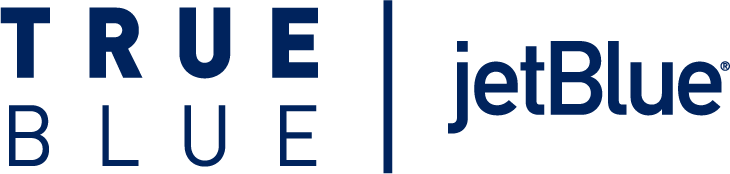
- Type: Frequent-flyer program
- Owner: JetBlue
- Introduced: 2008; 18 years ago
- Website: TrueBlue

TrueBlue is the frequent-flyer program of JetBlue that offers points to passengers traveling on most fare types, as well as to consumers who utilize JetBlue co-branded credit cards.

== History ==
JetBlue launched TrueBlue in 2008. Under the original TrueBlue program, flights were worth two, four, or six points based on distance of the flights, and double points were awarded for flights booked online.

In September 2009, JetBlue made changes to its TrueBlue program. In the new program, members receive three points for every dollar spent toward a flight, excluding taxes and fees, plus an additional three points for every dollar spent on a flight if booked online directly on the JetBlue.com website. Additional points are awarded if the member uses the Barclay's issued JetBlue Mastercard credit card to purchase the flight. The price of flights in points depend on the fare of the flight in U.S. dollars.

The new program launched on November 9, 2009.

In June 2013, JetBlue announced that TrueBlue points will never expire for any reason.

In April 2026, JetBlue announced enhancements to its TrueBlue loyalty program, including the launch of paid TrueBlue Subscriptions and expanded redemption options for travel extras. The changes allowed members to earn points through monthly or annual subscription tiers. Members can redeem points for items such as seat assignments, checked bags, pet travel fees and priority access at select airports.

== Partnership ==
JetBlue rewards program offers partnerships with the following companies with partnerships to accumulate points.

- Amazon
- Avis Budget Group
- InterContinental Hotels Group
- jetOpinions
- Marriott Bonvoy

=== Airlines ===
As of 2026, the following airlines partner with jetBlue TrueBlue to allow their customers to earn and redeem points from their airlines.

- China Airlines (only redeems TrueBlue points)
- Cape Air
- Condor
- Etihad Airways
- Icelandair
- Qatar Airways
- Singapore Airlines (only earns TrueBlue points)
- South African Airways (only earns TrueBlue points)
- United Airlines

== Mosaic ==
TrueBlue Mosaic is a top tier Loyalty Program within TrueBlue Operations. To have Mosaic Status, customers have to meet either two measures: they need either 15,000 points or 30 flight segments and 12,000 points, all within a calendar year.

The benefits include being among the first to board, first and second checked bags free, and a dedicated customer service line.
