= Joanna Geraghty =

Airline chief executive officer

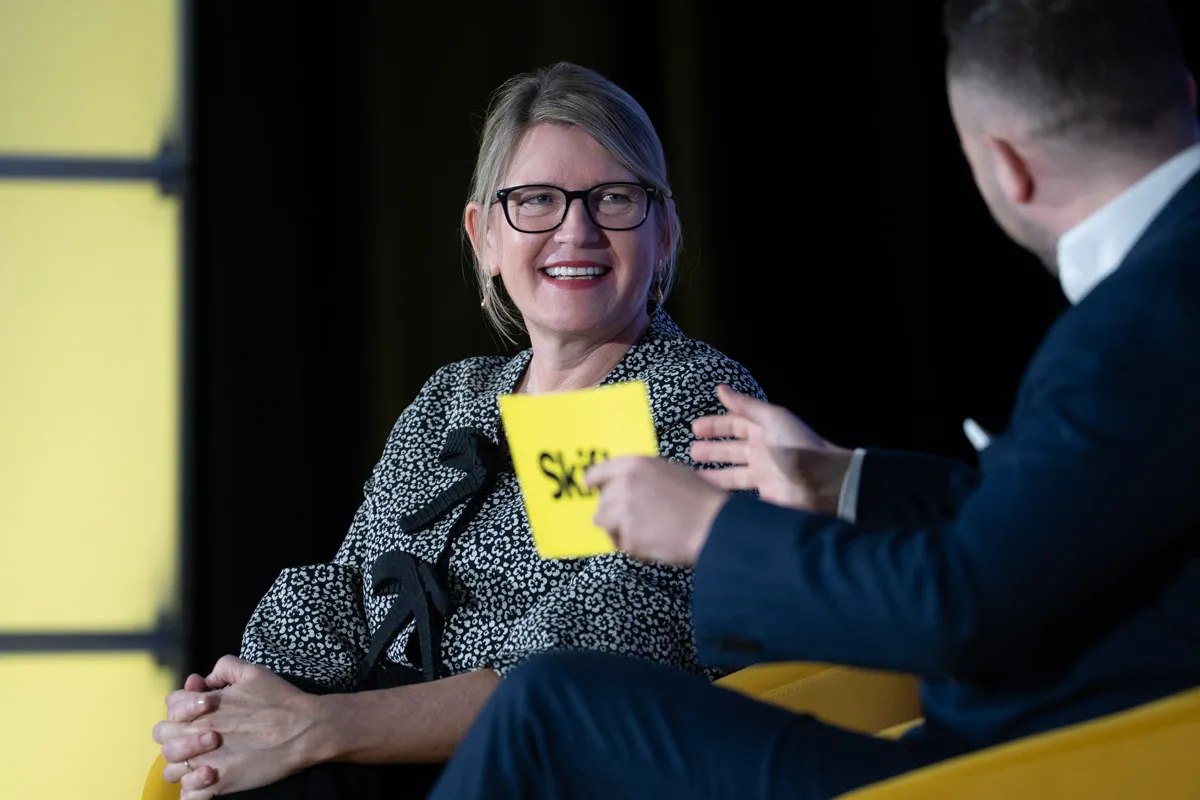
- Geraghty at the Skift Aviation Forum in 2025
- Born: October 1972 (age 54); United States
- Education: College of the Holy Cross (BA); Syracuse University (MA, JD)
- Occupations: Business executive; lawyer
- Title: CEO of JetBlue (2025–present)
- Predecessor: Robin Hayes

Joanna Lynn Geraghty (born October 1972) is an American business executive and lawyer. She is the chief executive officer (CEO) of the airline company JetBlue. She is the first woman to be the CEO of a major American airline company.

== Education ==
Geraghty graduated from the College of the Holy Cross with a Bachelor of Arts in sociology in 1994. She then earned a Master of Arts in international relations in 1997 from the Maxwell School of Citizenship and Public Affairs at Syracuse University and her Juris Doctor (J.D.) from the Syracuse University College of Law in 1997.

== Career ==
After law school, Geraghty first worked on aviation litigation at a small law firm before moving to the law firm Holland & Knight. In 2005 she was hired by JetBlue to serve as their director of litigation. She later served as the company's human resources officer. Starting in 2018 she served as president and chief operating officer, a position she held until 2024.

Geraghty was named chief executive of JetBlue in 2024, making her the first female CEO of a major airline.

Under her leadership, JetBlue underwent a fleet modernization—retiring its older Embraer E190 fleet and replacing them with new Airbus A220 aircraft in 2025. JetBlue also began introducing domestic first-class seating options, airport lounges at key hubs like JFK, and targeted premium loyalty offerings.

During her tenure, JetBlue reported a net loss of $795 million in 2024 and a $602 million net loss in 2025. Despite these losses, leadership denied bankruptcy. As a result, the airline trimmed capacity, exited or scaled back on unprofitable routes (such as Manchester, New Hampshire and Caribbean routes), and delayed roughly $3 billion in new aircraft orders.

Her tenure at JetBlue was marked by several controversies. In April 2026, a customer posted on X that the price of a last-minute ticket they needed to attend a funeral had risen by $230 in a single day. JetBlue's official account replied by suggesting the customer clear their cache and cookies or book in an incognito window. The response drew criticism from privacy advocates, lawmakers, and consumers, who raised concerns that the airline was using embedded tracking software to monitor user behavior and raise fares once a customer showed strong interest in a flight.. In response, Democratic lawmakers, including Rep. Greg Casar and Sen. Ruben Gallego, launched a formal inquiry, demanding details from Geraghty regarding consumer data and algorithmic pricing.

In August 2026, JetBlue was hit with another proposed class-action lawsuit in California seeking over $5 million in damage, where plaintiffs claim JetBlue engaged in "drip pricing" and false advertising by upselling customers to more expensive base fares (such as its legacy "Blue" tier) under the promise of "free seat selection.".

Geraghty also serves on the board of directors of the JetBlue Foundation, Airlines for America (A4A), L3Harris Technologies, and is chairperson of the board of Concern Worldwide, an international not for profit.
