= JetBlue =

Low-cost airline of the United States

Coordinates: 40.7508°N 73.9386°W

JetBlue Airways

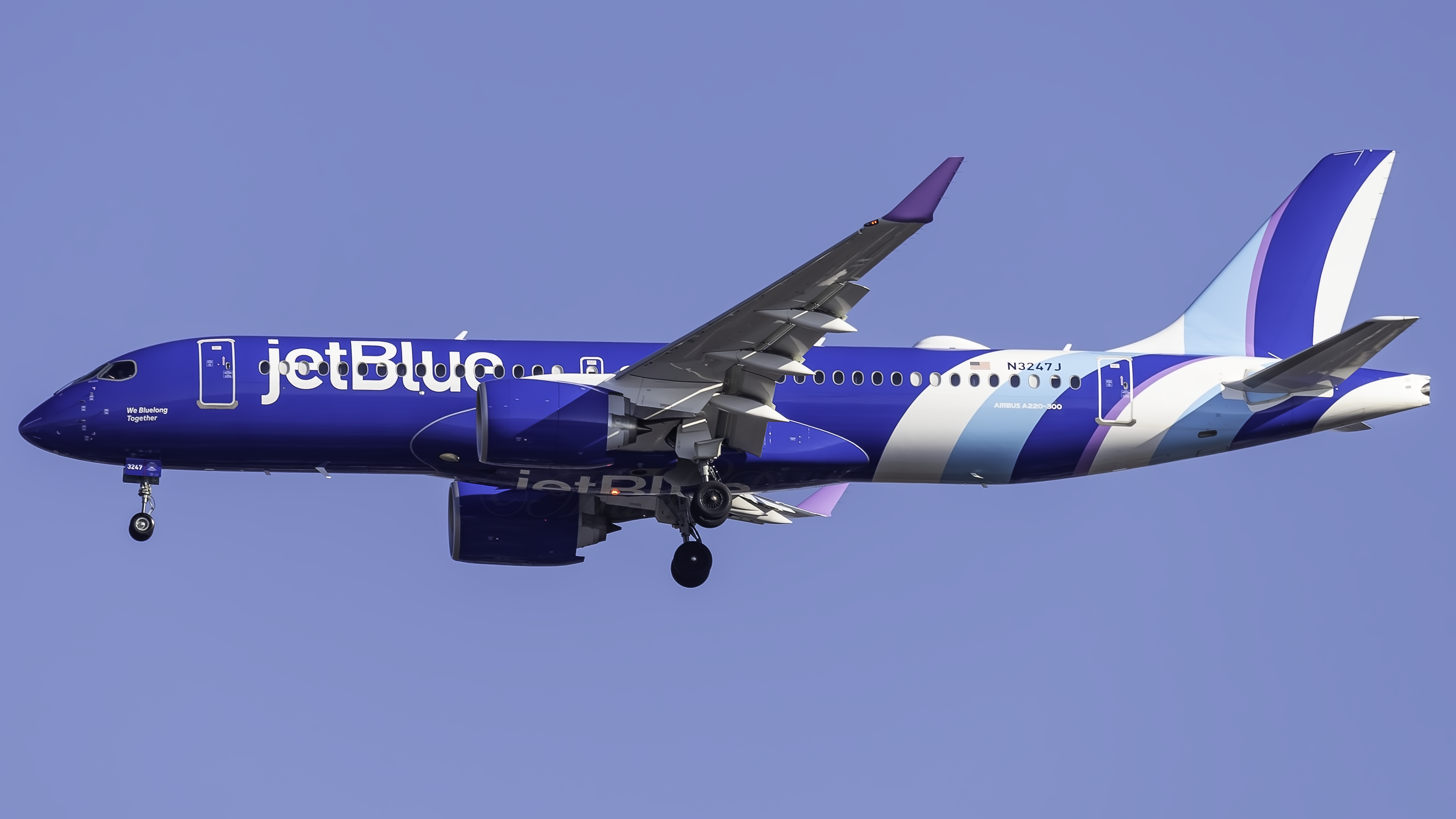
- A JetBlue Airbus A220
IATA	ICAO	Call sign
B6	JBU	JETBLUE
- Founded: August 1998; 28 years ago originally as NewAir
- Commenced operations: February 11, 2000; 26 years ago
- AOC #: YENA176J
- Focus cities: Boston; Fort Lauderdale; Los Angeles; New York–JFK; Orlando; San Juan
- Frequent-flyer program: TrueBlue
- Subsidiaries: Paisly
- Fleet size: 279
- Destinations: 111
- Traded as: Nasdaq: JBLU; S&P 600 component
- ISIN: US4771431016
- Headquarters: Brewster Building, Long Island City, Queens, New York City, U.S.
- Key people: Joanna Geraghty (CEO); Marty St. George (president); Peter Boneparth (chairman)
- Founder: David Neeleman
- Revenue: ▼US$9.1 billion (2025)
- Operating income: ▼US$(368) million (2025)
- Net income: ▼US$(602) million (2025)
- Total assets: ▼US$16.6 billion (2025)
- Total equity: ▼US$2.1 billion (2025)
- Employees: 23,000 (2025)
- Website: www.jetblue.com

JetBlue Airways Corporation, stylized as jetBlue, is an American low-cost airline headquartered in Long Island City, in Queens, New York City. Primarily a point-to-point carrier, JetBlue's network features six focus cities including its main hub at New York City's John F. Kennedy International Airport, with destinations across the Americas and Europe. Although not a member of any global airline alliances, JetBlue has codeshare agreements with airlines from Oneworld, SkyTeam, and Star Alliance.

== History ==
=== 1998–2000: Founding ===
JetBlue’s first aircraft, an Airbus A320 named Bluebird (N503JB), delivered in 1999

JetBlue was incorporated in Delaware in August 1998 with its headquarters in Forest Hills, Queens. David Neeleman founded the company in August 1999 under the name New Air. JetBlue started by following Southwest's approach of offering low-cost travel, but sought to distinguish itself by its amenities, such as in-flight entertainment, television at every seat, and SiriusXM satellite radio. JetBlue sought to primarily use the Airbus A320 family to ease maintenance, taking a similar approach to Southwest, which primarily uses the Boeing 737.

In September 1999, the airline was awarded 75 initial take-off/landing slots at John F. Kennedy International Airport and received its United States Department of Transportation certificate of public convenience and necessity authorization in February 2000. It commenced operations on February 11, 2000, with services to Buffalo and Fort Lauderdale.

JetBlue's founders had set out to call the airline "Taxi" and therefore have a yellow livery to associate the airline with New York. However the idea was dropped after threats from investor JP Morgan to pull its share ($40 million of the total $128 million) of the airline's initial funding unless the name was changed.

=== 2000s ===
JetBlue was one of only a few U.S. airlines that made a profit during the sharp downturn in airline travel following the September 11 attacks. The company's planned Initial Public Offering (IPO) was put on hold due to the attacks and subsequent downturn. The IPO took place in April 2002, raising $260 million at its NASDAQ debut.

The airline sector responded to JetBlue and Southwest's market presence by starting mini-rival carriers: Delta Air Lines started Song, and United Airlines launched another rival called Ted. Song has since been disbanded and was reabsorbed by Delta and Ted reabsorbed by United.

In October 2005, JetBlue's quarterly profit had plunged from US$8.1 million to $2.7 million largely due to rising fuel costs. Operational issues, fuel prices, and low fares, JetBlue's hallmark, were bringing its financial performance down. In addition, with higher costs related to the airline's numerous amenities, JetBlue was becoming less competitive.

For many years, analysts had predicted that JetBlue's growth rate would become unsustainable. Despite this, the airline continued to add planes and routes to the fleet at a brisk pace. In addition in 2006, the IAM (International Association of Machinists) attempted to unionize JetBlue's ramp service workers, in a move that was described by JetBlue's COO Dave Barger as "pretty hypocritical", as the IAM opposed JetBlue's creation when it was founded as New Air in 1998. The union organizing petition was dismissed by the National Mediation Board because fewer than 35 percent of eligible employees supported an election.

JetBlue experienced its first-ever quarterly loss during the fourth quarter of 2005 when the airline lost $42.4 million, enough to make them unprofitable for the entire year of 2005. The loss was the airline's first since going public in 2002. In addition to that, JetBlue forecasted a loss for 2006, citing high fuel prices, operating inefficiency, and fleet costs. During the first quarter report, CEO David Neeleman, President Dave Barger, and then-CFO John Owen released JetBlue's "Return to Profitability" ("RTP") plan, stating in detail how they would curtail costs and improve revenue to regain profitability. The plan called for $50 million in annual cost cuts and a push to boost revenue by $30 million. In October 2006, JetBlue announced a net loss of $500,000 for the third quarter, and a plan to regain that loss by deferring some of its Embraer E190 deliveries and by selling five of its Airbus A320s.

In December 2006, JetBlue, as part of their RTP plan, removed a row of seats from their A320s to lighten the aircraft by 904 lb (410 kg) and reduce the cabin crew size from four to three (per FAA regulation requiring one flight attendant per 50 seats), thus offsetting the lost revenue from the removal of seats, and further lightening the aircraft, resulting in less fuel burned. In January 2007, JetBlue returned to profitability with a fourth quarter profit in 2006, reversing a quarterly loss in the year-earlier period. As part of the RTP plan, 2006's full-year loss was $1 million compared to 2005's full-year loss of $20 million. JetBlue was one of the few major airlines to post a profit in that quarter.

While its financial performance started showing signs of improvement, in February 2007, JetBlue faced a crisis, when the blizzard of 2007 hit the Northeast and Midwest, throwing the airline's operations into chaos. Because JetBlue followed the practice of never cancelling flights, it desisted from calling flights off, even when the ice storm hit and the airline was forced to keep several planes on the ground. Because of this, passengers were kept waiting at the airports for their flights to take off. In some cases, passengers who had already boarded their planes were kept waiting on the apron for several hours and were not allowed to disembark. However, after all this, the airline was eventually forced to cancel most of its flights because of prevailing weather conditions. This reportedly cost JetBlue $30 million.

In February 2007, JetBlue announced its partnership with Irish flag carrier Aer Lingus to allow passengers to switch between airlines on a single ticket for flights with connections in either New York JFK or Boston. Unlike traditional codeshare agreements, the partnership did not allow the airlines to directly sell seats on each other's flights. Therefore, customers initiated the purchase on one airline's website, and then were transferred to the other airline's website to complete the transaction.

Following the February 2007 incident in which the airline was forced to cancel nearly 1,700 flights due to winter storms, JetBlue's board of directors replaced founder and chief executive officer David Neeleman with Dave Barger. He had politicked the board, while Neeleman was busy publicly apologizing. Barger's ascendancy caused widespread demoralization in the ranks. He became JetBlue's new chief executive officer on May 10, 2007. Neeleman, the company's founder and largest individual investor, became a nonexecutive chairman as a result of the change.

In early 2007, JetBlue also faced reliability problems with its Embraer E190 fleet. For a couple of months, JetBlue contracted ExpressJet to operate four Embraer ERJ 145 regional jets on behalf of JetBlue. While this was going on, two E190 aircraft at a time were sent to an Embraer maintenance facility in Nashville, Tennessee. ExpressJet operated routes between Boston Logan and Buffalo, New York, and Washington Dulles, and between New York–JFK and Columbus, Ohio (since terminated), and Richmond, Virginia.

In July 2007, the airline partnered with 20th Century Fox's film The Simpsons Movie to become the "Official Airline of Springfield". In addition, a contest was held in which the grand prize would be a trip on JetBlue to Los Angeles to attend the premiere of the film. The airline's website was also redecorated with characters and their favorite JetBlue destinations and the company was taken over by the show/film's businessman villain Montgomery Burns.

In August 2007, the airline added exclusive content from The New York Times in the form of an in-flight video magazine, conducted by Times journalists and content from NYTimes.com.

On November 8, 2007, JetBlue appointed Ed Barnes as interim CFO, following the resignation of former CFO John Harvey.

In December 13 2007, Lufthansa agreed terms to purchase a 19% shareholding, pending approval from US regulators. Following the acquisition, Lufthansa stated they planned to seek operational cooperation with JetBlue. Lufthansa planned to offer connections to JetBlue flights in Boston, New York (JFK), and Orlando International Airport (no longer a connection). After making a codeshare agreement with Lufthansa that went into effect in 2010, JetBlue transitioned to the Sabre reservation system enabling the airlines to sell tickets on each other's flights, transfer luggage and passengers between the two carriers, and combine frequent flyer programs. By making use of JetBlue's North America routes as a feeder network, the agreement put Lufthansa in a position to operate quasi-hubs in New York–JFK and Boston Logan.

In the March edition of Airways Magazine, it was announced that once JetBlue partnered with Yahoo! and with BlackBerry producer Research in Motion, that the airline would offer free, limited Wi-Fi capabilities on a single aircraft, N651JB, an Airbus A320-200 dubbed "BetaBlue". People could access e-mail with a Wi-Fi capable Blackberry, or use Yahoo!'s e-mail and instant messaging with a Wi-Fi capable laptop, while in flight over the US. LiveTV in Melbourne, Florida, created and operated the "BetaBlue" prototype. The "BetaBlue" system utilized the bandwidth and infrastructure of defunct Airfone.

On March 19, 2008, JetBlue added Orlando, Florida, as a gateway focus city to international destinations in the Caribbean, Mexico, and South America. New international routes from Orlando International Airport included Cancún, Mexico; Bridgetown, Barbados; Bogotá, Colombia; Nassau, Bahamas; San José, Costa Rica; and Santo Domingo, Dominican Republic. In conjunction with the addition of new routes the airline continued significant expansion of operations at Orlando International Airport including a 292-room lodge that houses trainees attending the existing "JetBlue University" training facility, which opened in 2015.

On May 21, 2008, JetBlue named Joel Peterson chairman and Frank Sica vice chairman of its board of directors, replacing David Neeleman, who had stepped down as CEO in 2007.

On August 4, 2008, the Associated Press reported that JetBlue would replace their recycled pillows and blankets with an "eco-friendly" pillow and blanket package that passengers would have to purchase for use. This decision was in a series of moves designed to increase revenue. JetBlue told the Associated Press that it expected to collect $40 million from passengers selecting seats with extra legroom and $20 million from passengers paying $15 to check a second bag. In September 2008, JetBlue began charging passengers $10–30 for an extended-leg-room seat depending on the length of the flight.

In September 2008, JetBlue began operating Republican vice presidential candidate Sarah Palin's campaign aircraft, an E190.

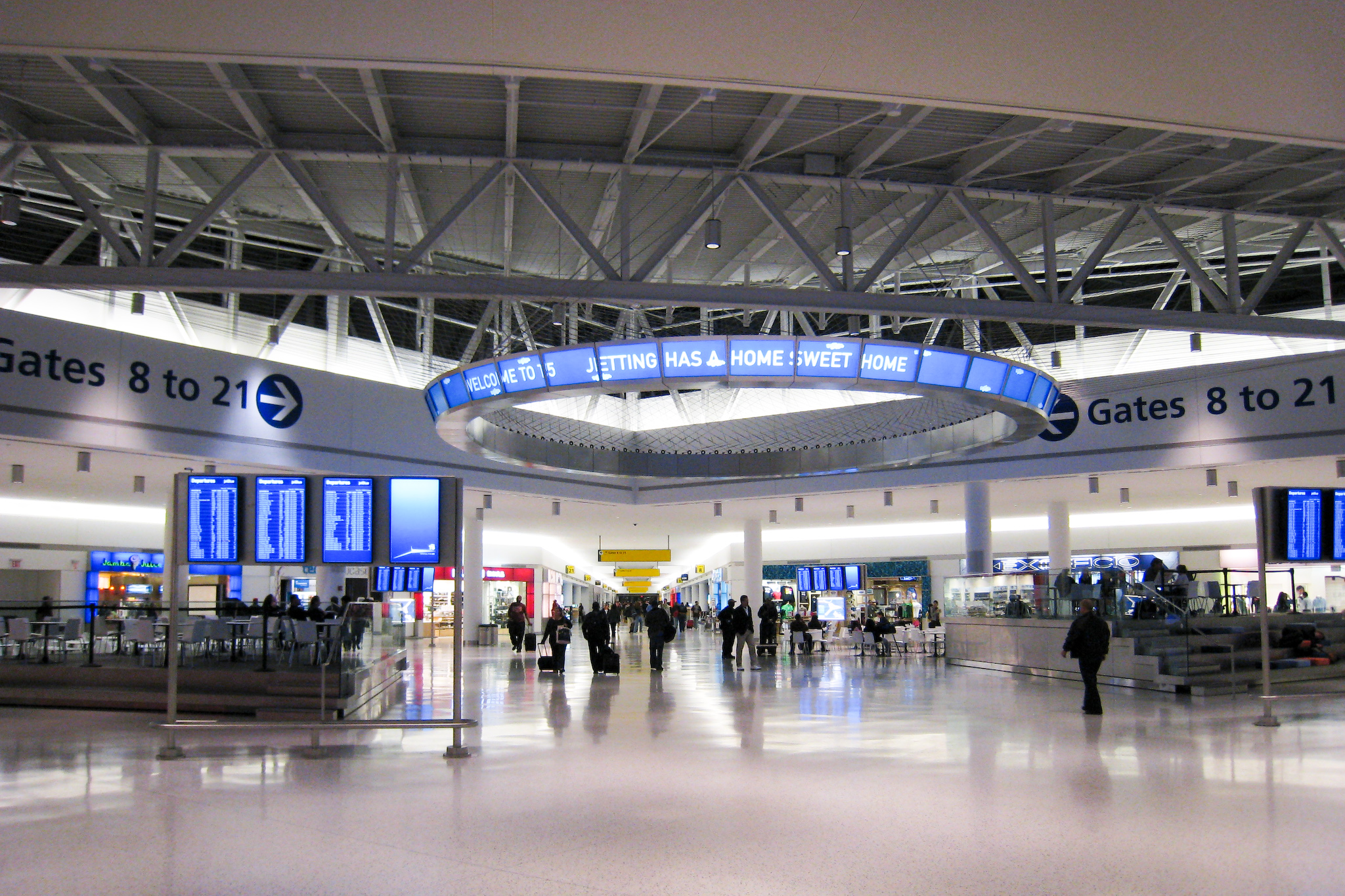
The entry hall of Terminal 5 at John F. Kennedy International Airport

On October 22, 2008, JetBlue opened its new primary hub at John F. Kennedy International Airport (JFK), Terminal 5, or simply T5, costing approximately $800 million to build. The first flight arrived from Bob Hope Airport (B6 #358) at 5:06am followed by arrivals from Oakland International Airport and Long Beach Airport, respectively. The new T5 replaced JetBlue's old hub at JFK Terminal 6. The last flight to operate out of T6 was a departure to Rafael Hernández Airport in Aguadilla, Puerto Rico, departing at 11:59pm.

In 2009, JetBlue announced that it was looking for a new headquarters location, and was considering moving either within the New York City metropolitan area or to the Orlando, Florida, area. In April 2009, Helen Marshall, the president of the Borough of Queens, said that the City of New York was trying to keep JetBlue in the city.

On October 13, 2009, the airline unveiled a modification to its livery in commemoration of the upcoming tenth anniversary of the airline in February 2010. Besides a new tail design, the revised livery includes larger "billboard" titles extending down over the passenger windows at the front of the aircraft. The logo word 'jetBlue' was no longer silver and blue but a dark, navy blue.

=== 2010s ===
In 2010, JetBlue entered into interline booking agreements with South African Airways and American Airlines to facilitate luggage transfers between airlines for passengers with connecting flights on a different carrier. The agreement with American included JetBlue's 18 destinations not served by American and American's 12 international flights out of New York–JFK and Boston Logan. In addition, American gave JetBlue eight round trips slots out of Washington National in D.C. and two out of Westchester, New York. In return, JetBlue gave American six round trips out of New York–JFK. The agreement with American Airlines has since ended according to JetBlue's website.

In January 2010, the CEO of JetBlue, Dave Barger, and Governor of Florida Charlie Crist met in Tallahassee, Florida, to discuss a possible move of the airline's headquarters to Orlando. On March 22, 2010, JetBlue announced it headquarters would remain in the New York City area, in Long Island City, because of the airline's historical links to the city, the cost of staff relocations, the airline's desire to retain access to financial markets, and because Aer Lingus and Lufthansa, JetBlue's marketing partners, fly into JFK Airport. JetBlue planned to combine its Forest Hills and Darien, Connecticut, offices, together about 1,000 employees, into about 200,000 square feet (19,000 m^{2}) in the Brewster Building by mid-2012. On March 22, 2010, JetBlue turned down incentives from the City of Orlando and announced its headquarters would keep its Forest Hills office, start leasing and using a new office in the Brewster Building in Long Island City, New York. in Queens Plaza in Long Island City, move its headquarters there in mid 2012, and start a joint branding deal with New York State using the iconic I Love NY logo.

On October 18, 2011, CFO Ed Barnes resigned, effective immediately. The company's treasurer, Mark Powers, was appointed interim CFO until a replacement for Barnes could be found.

In 2011, JetBlue made interline agreements with Virgin Atlantic and Jet Airways, both of which have since been terminated.

On June 13, 2012, JetBlue ranked "Highest in Customer Satisfaction Among Low Cost Carriers in North America" by J.D. Power and Associates for the eighth year in a row.

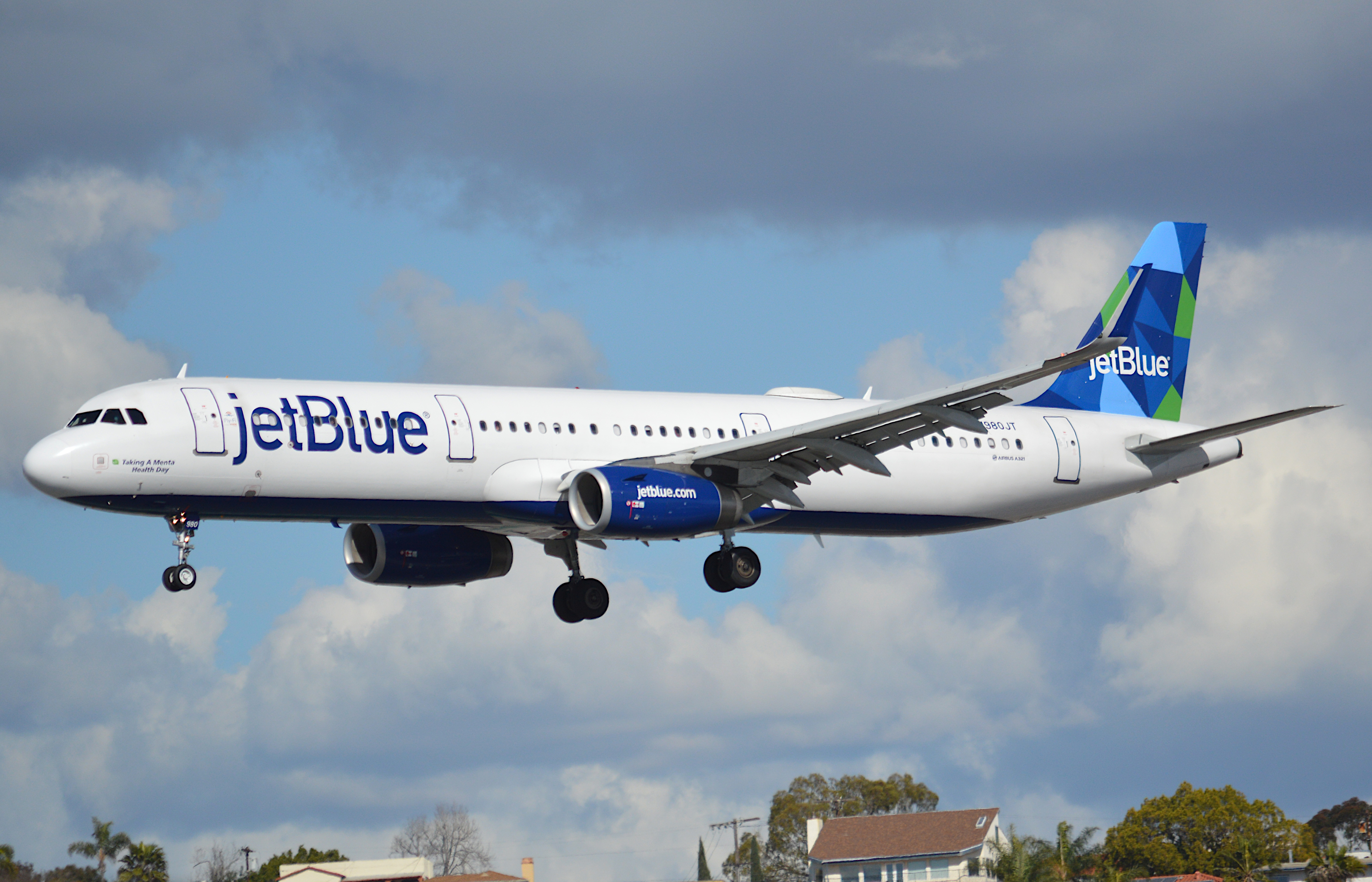
JetBlue launched its Mint premium cabin service in 2013 with new Airbus A321 aircraft.

In October 2013, JetBlue introduced Mint, a premium cabin service on transcontinental and select Caribbean flights. The service began in 2014, using the Airbus A321-200 aircraft ordered by JetBlue. These planes are outfitted with winglets, as well as with "lie flat" seats, and moveable partitions that can create small suites on the airplane. Called "Mint" by JetBlue, these planes are configured with 16 business-class seats and 143 economy seats, instead of an all-economy configuration of 190 seats.

On April 22, 2014, JetBlue's pilots voted to unionize for the first time since the airline was founded, with 71% casting ballots in favor of joining the ALPA.

On September 18, 2014, Dave Barger announced his resignation from the company effective February 16, 2015, following several reports that investors and the board were unhappy with his performance. He was replaced on the board and as CEO by Robin Hayes.

During the last few days of June and the first few days of July 2015, JetBlue began charging for bags in certain booking classes, leaving Southwest Airlines the only major U.S. carrier to not charge for bags. For the classes in which bag check fees were charged (generally the lowest class of fares offered; JetBlue offered three classes of fares), the cost was $20 for the first bag and $35 for the second, which was the lowest in the United States besides Frontier Airlines with similar prices.

On May 6, 2015, JetBlue was one of the first airlines to be granted a license to commence charter flights to Cuba, with flights departing from New York City. The weekly charter service began on July 3, 2015, with 150-seat Airbus A320s.

In July 2016, JetBlue announced commercial flights from the United States to Cuba would commence in late August. On August 31, 2016, JetBlue Flight 387 from Fort Lauderdale–Hollywood International Airport to Abel Santamaría Airport, in Santa Clara, became the first scheduled commercial flight between the United States and Cuba in 55 years. Only charter flights were allowed under previous rules, which required that passengers had to arrive more than four hours before the scheduled departure and often endure long lines for documentation checks, late flight arrivals, and pay high baggage fees.

In 2016, JetBlue had bid for but was unsuccessful in acquiring Virgin America, which was instead acquired by Alaska Air Group.

In November 2016, JetBlue painted one of their Airbus A320 aircraft, N763JB, in a 1960s retrojet livery, dubbed "What's Old is Blue Again". The livery's maiden flight was on Friday, from New York JFK to Palm Springs.

In July 2017, JetBlue announced it was taking qualifications to develop a terminal at JFK that would not only occupy terminal 5 but also the space of terminals 6 and 7.

In April 2018, JetBlue announced their return to Ontario International Airport in southern California after ten years, as well as new service to Steamboat Springs in Colorado and Bozeman in Montana.

During 2018 JetBlue along with 90 additional Fortune 500 companies "paid an effective federal tax rate of 0% or less" as a result of Donald Trump's Tax Cuts and Jobs Act of 2017.

In April 2019, JetBlue announced that it would launch transatlantic flights to London from Boston and New York. The airline added that it would be converting 13 orders for the A321neo into the longer range Airbus A321LR to serve the new routes.

On May 1, 2019, JetBlue named Michael Stromer as Chief Product Officer, Technology. Stromer was selected to lead the design and execution of the digital commerce web and mobile applications that support revenue initiatives; technology for airport, customer support (reservations), system operations, technical operations, flight, and inflight teams, as well as back office products.

On May 29, 2019, JetBlue and Southwest Airlines ranked "Highest in Customer Satisfaction Among Low Cost Carriers" in a tie by J.D. Power in the North America Airline Satisfaction Study.

On October 18, 2019, JetBlue and Norwegian Air Shuttle announced plans for an interline agreement that would permit sales of jointly-issued tickets, which if approved between the two airlines, would come into effect during 2020. The partnership was to take advantage of each airline having substantial pre-existing presence at New York–JFK, Boston, and Fort Lauderdale airports.

=== 2020s ===
In January 2020, JetBlue announced its intentions to start becoming carbon neutral on all domestic flights. In February 2020, Joel Peterson announced his intention to retire from the airline's board of directors at the end of his current term, and was succeeded by Peter Boneparth in May 2020. Peterson had been part of the airline's board of directors since 1999 and served as chairman since 2008.

JetBlue made changes to its operations due to the COVID-19 pandemic and its associated impacts on aviation. This included the reduction of passenger capacity by blocking middle seats on its Airbus A320 and A321 aircraft, and aisle seats on the Embraer E190. As a result of the economic effects caused by the pandemic, the company launched voluntary separation and extended time off programs. By August 2020, JetBlue, along with Southwest Airlines, implemented strict policies for the wearing of face masks, which did not allow for medical exemptions, as part of its procedures during the COVID-19 pandemic. The airline also announced that it would also continue to block middle seats through at least mid October.

In June 2020, the airline announced several new routes across its network, including point-to-point routes between the northeastern United States and Florida, and new transcontinental routes from Newark Liberty International Airport. Along with the impact of the COVID-19 pandemic on aviation, the airline announced that over 60% of its employees were interested in taking early retirement or long-term leave from the firm.

On July 9, 2020, JetBlue announced the imminent closure of its base at Long Beach Airport and transfer of the base's operations to Los Angeles International Airport from October 6, 2020. JetBlue had spent years negotiating to create a U.S. Customs and Border Protection station at the airport, and in 2017, despite a favorable recommendation from the city administration, the city council voted against the plan. The city and the airline also had disputes over late landings and slot usage. However, this was short lived because in September 2024, JetBlue officially closed their LAX focus city due to the federal court blocking their merger with Spirit Airlines, causing massive cuts and downgrading LAX from an operating base to a spoke city in their system for now. It remains to be seen if JetBlue will reopen their LAX operating base or replace it in a different city.

On July 16, 2020, American Airlines joined JetBlue in a strategic partnership called the "Northeast Alliance," which allowed the two carriers to share passengers and revenue and coordinate schedules for flights to and from New York's three major airports and Boston. While the deal with American had the blessing of the Trump administration, the Department of Justice under President Biden, along with six states and the District of Columbia, initiated an antitrust lawsuit in 2022. On May 19, 2023, the court ruled against the airlines, holding that the JetBlue–American partnership was anticompetitive and ordering it to be unwound. Despite American announcing it would appeal, JetBlue said it would follow the judge's order and terminate their three-year alliance. JetBlue said ending the alliance would render "entirely moot" the Justice Department's objections that led to its separate lawsuit to block JetBlue's proposed merger with Spirit Airlines, which would be the largest in the US airline industry since 2013. American said it "respected JetBlue's decision to focus on its other antitrust and regulatory challenges" but still planned to proceed with its appeal. Experts said abandoning the partnership with American may only marginally help JetBlue when the Spirit case goes to trial in October 2023.

On February 1, 2021, JetBlue introduced its new Mint product called Mint Suite, which was to be configured on its entire Airbus A321LR fleet for its future transatlantic flights to London, and on some of its A321neo aircraft for select flights initially to Los Angeles. On April 21, 2021, JetBlue announced that the airline would be expanding into Canada, announcing new routes between Vancouver and both New York City and Boston. On April 26, 2021, JetBlue held its inaugural Airbus A220-300 flight which flew from Boston Logan International Airport to Tampa International Airport. On May 19, 2021, JetBlue confirmed the start dates and destination airports for its planned flights to London, and by extension its first flights to Europe. The airline announced that it would operate services from New York (JFK) to both London Heathrow and Gatwick airports, and that the services would launch on August 11 and September 29, 2021, respectively. In turn, the airline's planned flights between London and Boston were postponed to 2022.

In May 2022, JetBlue's offer for Spirit Airlines, made in response to an offer from Frontier Airlines, was rejected, citing "an unacceptable level of closing risk" even with an enhanced offer. Later that month, JetBlue announced its intentions to execute a hostile takeover of Spirit. On July 28, JetBlue announced it had reached an agreement to purchase Spirit Airlines for $3.8 billion. The U.S. Department of Justice's Antitrust Division has sought to block the deal, taking JetBlue to court over the sale. In legal filings, the Justice Department claims that the merger will result in "higher fares, fewer seats, and harm millions of consumers".

In September 2022, JetBlue's venture subsidiary relaunched with a new name: JetBlue Ventures.

In November 2022, JetBlue confirmed plans to fly from New York (JFK) to Paris (CDG) starting in summer 2023. It said it then plans to add service from Boston Logan after.

In April 2023, JetBlue continued its international expansion, announcing that it would add Amsterdam to its list of international destinations with a new route from John F. Kennedy International Airport to Amsterdam Airport Schiphol in late summer 2023. Robin Hayes, JetBlue CEO, said that the New York to Amsterdam route is "long overdue for some competition."

JetBlue changed its standard livery in June 2023 to a primarily blue one with lighter accents.

In October 2023, JetBlue announced it would add flights from both Boston and New York (JFK) to Dublin, Ireland, and New York (JFK) to Edinburgh, Scotland, in 2024. Service from Boston to Amsterdam would also begin that year. The announcement will bring JetBlue's list of transatlantic destinations to six.

The Spirit case went to trial on October 31, 2023. JetBlue argued that if it acquired Spirit and thus grew its fleet by 70%, it would be more able to compete with the Big Four airlines. The Justice Department argued that an independent Spirit fills a role for price-conscious consumers that needs to be protected. JetBlue said the vacuum Spirit would leave in the market would be filled by growth from other budget carriers. The Justice Department said that was unlikely because the limits to growth that airlines face, such as shortages of planes and pilots, affect all airlines, including the discount carriers. In a ruling on January 16, 2024, a federal judge blocked JetBlue's acquisition of Spirit Airlines. The two airlines initially said they would appeal, but on March 4, 2024, they announced they were calling off the merger, with JetBlue paying Spirit a breakup fee of $69 million and Spirit's shareholders $400 million.

In January 2024, JetBlue announced that CEO Robin Hayes will step down effective February 12 and would be replaced by president Joanna Geraghty. She will become the first woman to lead a major US airline. On February 7, 2024, the airline announced that Marty St. George, would return to the airline as president starting on February 26, 2024, after leaving the airline back in 2020 to be the COO of LATAM Airlines Group.

In May 2024, JetBlue expanded its San Juan hub, adding six new routes—including its first Mint premium cabin flights to/from JFK international.

Q4 2024 earnings revealed that JetBlue's "JetForward" restructuring yielded $395 million in revenue improvements in 2024, exceeding targets, boosting on-time performance, and improving customer satisfaction rankings year-over-year.

In January 2025, JetBlue was fined $2 million by the US Department of Transportation (DOT) for "operating multiple chronically delayed flights," marking the first time an airline was fined by the DOT for delays on particular routes.

Beginning January 2025, JetBlue initiated daily flights from Manchester‑Boston Regional Airport to Florida destinations. In March/April 2025, JetBlue resumed or launched more daily flights from JFK to Washington, D.C., Detroit, Hartford, Pittsburgh, Providence, and seasonal service to Burbank.

In April 2025, American Airlines announced they were suing JetBlue for over $1 million in unpaid obligations dating back to their dissolved Northeast Alliance. The deal fell apart due to falling foul of US antitrust laws, which a court deemed to be anticompetitive.

In May 2025, JetBlue and United Airlines announced a new partnership involving reciprocal frequent-flier benefits and shared booking access. United will return to JFK via JetBlue slots by 2027.

On September 9, 2025, JetBlue retired the Embraer E190. JetBlue's Chief Operating Officer Warren Christie was the captain of its last revenue flight from John F. Kennedy International Airport to Logan International Airport.

In March 2026, JetBlue hired financial advisors to manage a possible sale of itself and all of its assets, as it talked to rival airlines for a possible acquisition of the company. In April 2026, founder David Neeleman warned that JetBlue may not be able to continue operating as a "going concern", and claimed that it was on the verge of filing for Chapter 11 bankruptcy

However, CEO Joanna Geraghty disputes these claims, stating that the airline had no plans to file for bankruptcy in 2026, despite rising jet fuel prices. Geraghty claimed that JetBlue secured over $500 million in debt financing to support up to 22 aircraft.

== Network ==
As of January 2024, JetBlue Airways flies to 104 destinations in the Americas, with most of them in the United States and the Caribbean, a smaller selection of destinations in parts of Central and South America, and four destinations in Europe.

=== Codeshare agreements ===
JetBlue has entered into a number of codeshare agreements with other airlines, meaning airlines agree to share certain flights, which both airlines market and publish on their own flight schedules under their respective airline designators and flight numbers.

JetBlue codeshares with the following airlines:

- Aer Lingus
- Air Serbia
- Azul Brazilian Airlines
- Brightline (higher-speed passenger rail service in Florida)
- British Airways
- Cape Air
- El Al
- Etihad Airways
- JSX
- Icelandair
- LOT Polish Airlines
- Porter Airlines
- Qatar Airways
- Royal Air Maroc
- Seaborne Airlines
- Singapore Airlines
- South African Airways
- Turkish Airlines

=== Interline agreement ===
In February 2025, JetBlue and Contour Airlines signed a new interline agreement that allow customers to book for single itineraries. This agreement allows JetBlue to access smaller and underserved market destinations provided by Contour whilst allowing them to access their vast international network routes in the Americas.

In January 2026, JetBlue implemented an interline agreement with Arkia, providing a connection for passengers travelling to and from Ben Gurion Airport (TLV) in Israel at JetBlue's hub at JFK.

== Fleet ==
=== Current fleet ===
As of June 2025, JetBlue operates the following aircraft:

Aircraft	In service	Orders	Passengers					Notes
Aircraft	In service	Orders	J	Y+	Y	Total	Refs	Notes
Airbus A220-300	66	34	—	25	115	140		Some aircraft parked due to PW1500G engine issues
Airbus A320-200	10	—	—	42	108	150		Older aircraft to be retired
Airbus A320-200	120	—	—	42	120	162		
Airbus A321-200	35	—	16	41	102	159		
Airbus A321-200	28	—	—	42	158	200		
Airbus A321LR	11	2	24	24	90	138		
Airbus A321neo	14	29	16	42	102	160		
Airbus A321neo	16	—	—	42	158	200		Some aircraft parked due to PW1100G engine issues
Airbus A321XLR	—	13	24	24	90	138		Two to be delivered this year and the remaining to be deferred to 2030
Total	300	78						

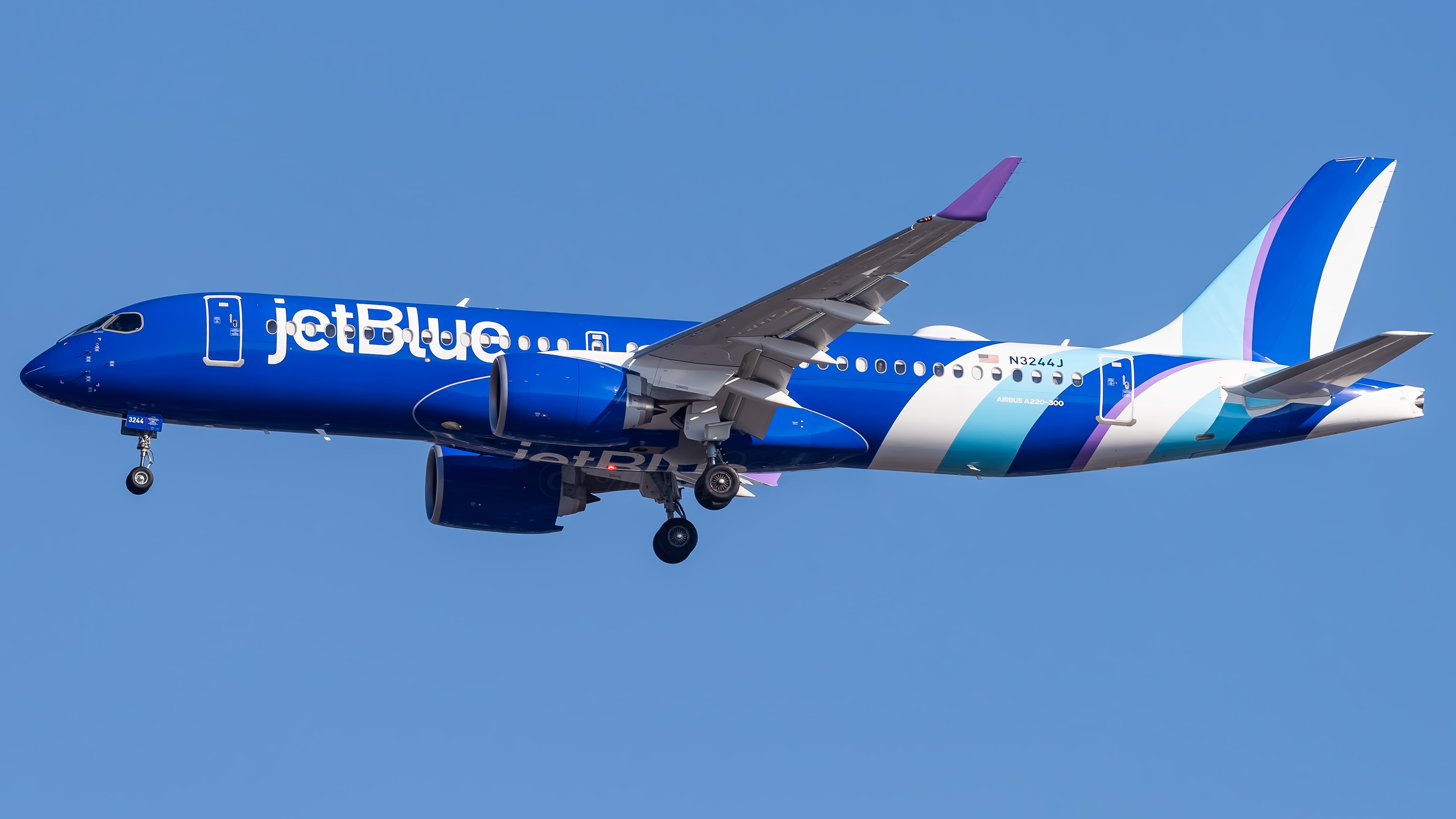
Airbus A220-300

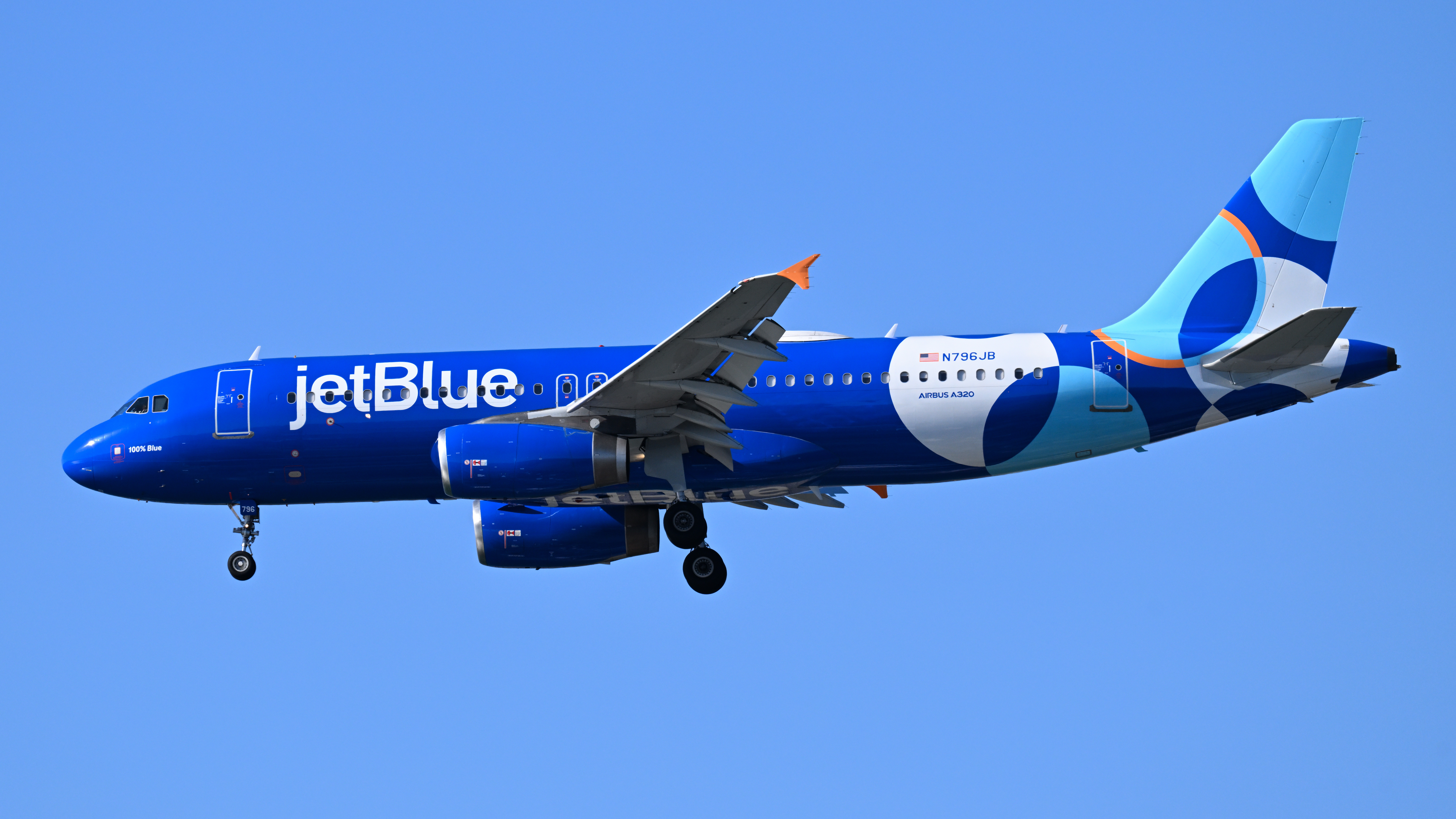
Airbus A320

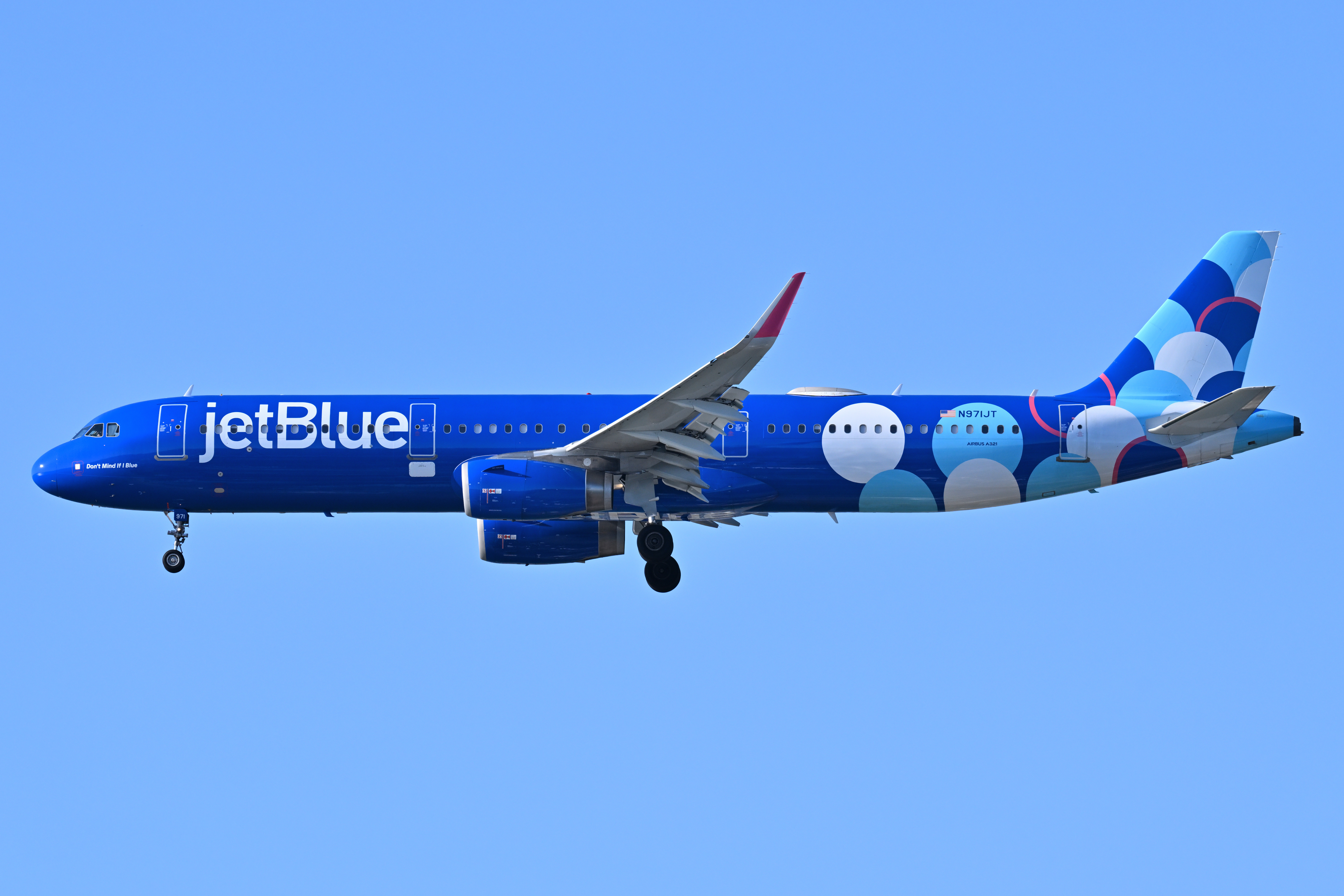
Airbus A321

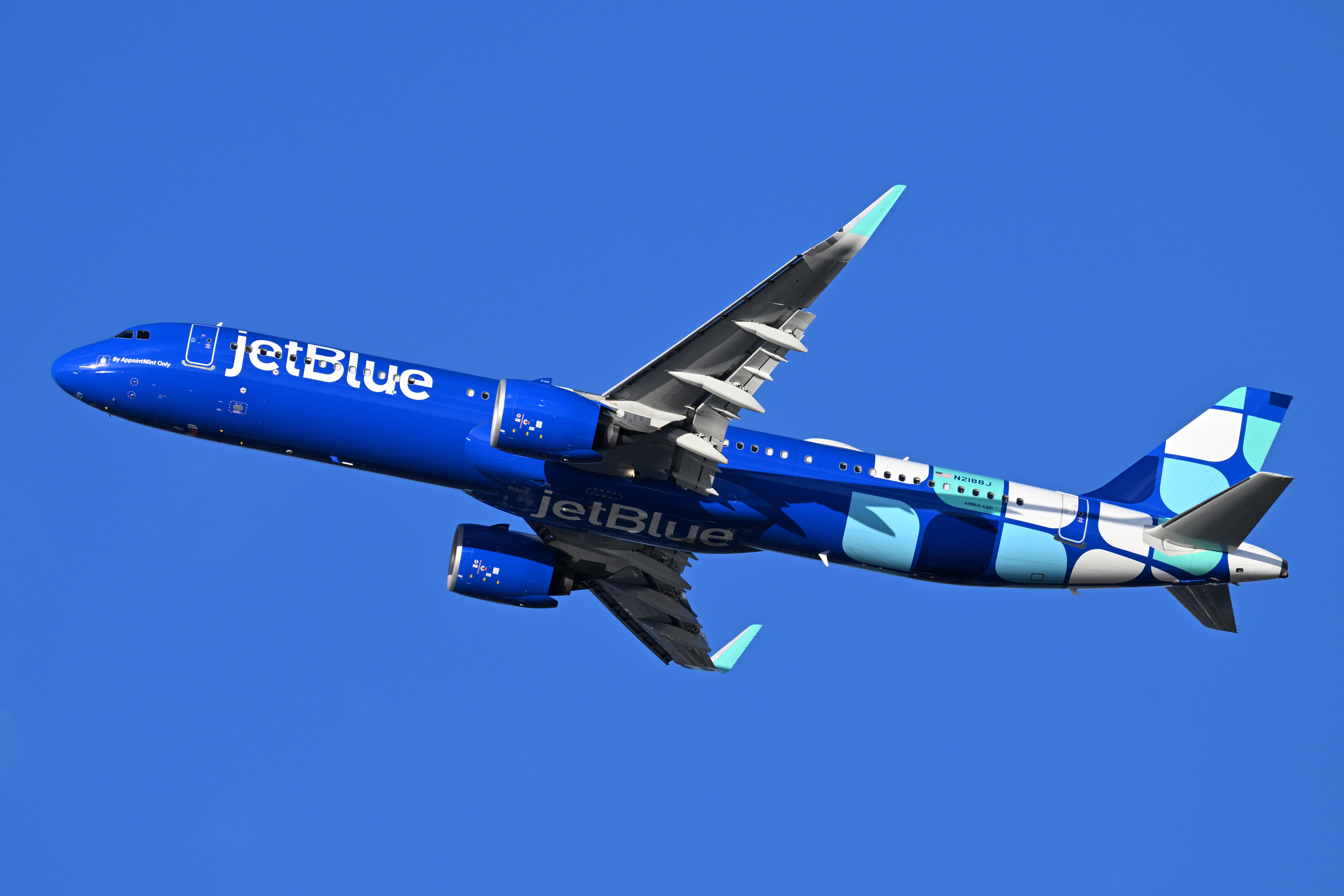
Airbus A321neo

=== Fleet development ===
Since 2011, JetBlue has made multiple order and order differentials. At first, the airline intended to revamp its fleet with the introduction of 40 Airbus A320neos. The airline has made multiple changes to its order books with ordering multiple Airbus A321 aircraft and later converting almost all of its A320neo orders to ones for the Airbus A321neo.

From 2018 to 2019, the airline made multiple changes to its fleet plans, with the airline intending to replace all of its aging Embraer E190 aircraft with the Airbus A220-300. The airline later modified its Airbus A321neo orders to introduce the Airbus A321XLR aircraft to its fleet.

In 2020, JetBlue welcomed its first Airbus A220, and in 2021, the A321LR was added to the fleet. The airline had expected to welcome the Airbus A321XLR aircraft to its fleet in 2025, but subsequently deferred delivery of 44 aircraft – including the XLR variant – until at least 2030 as part of its JetForward strategy to return the airline to profitability.

=== Historical JetBlue fleet ===
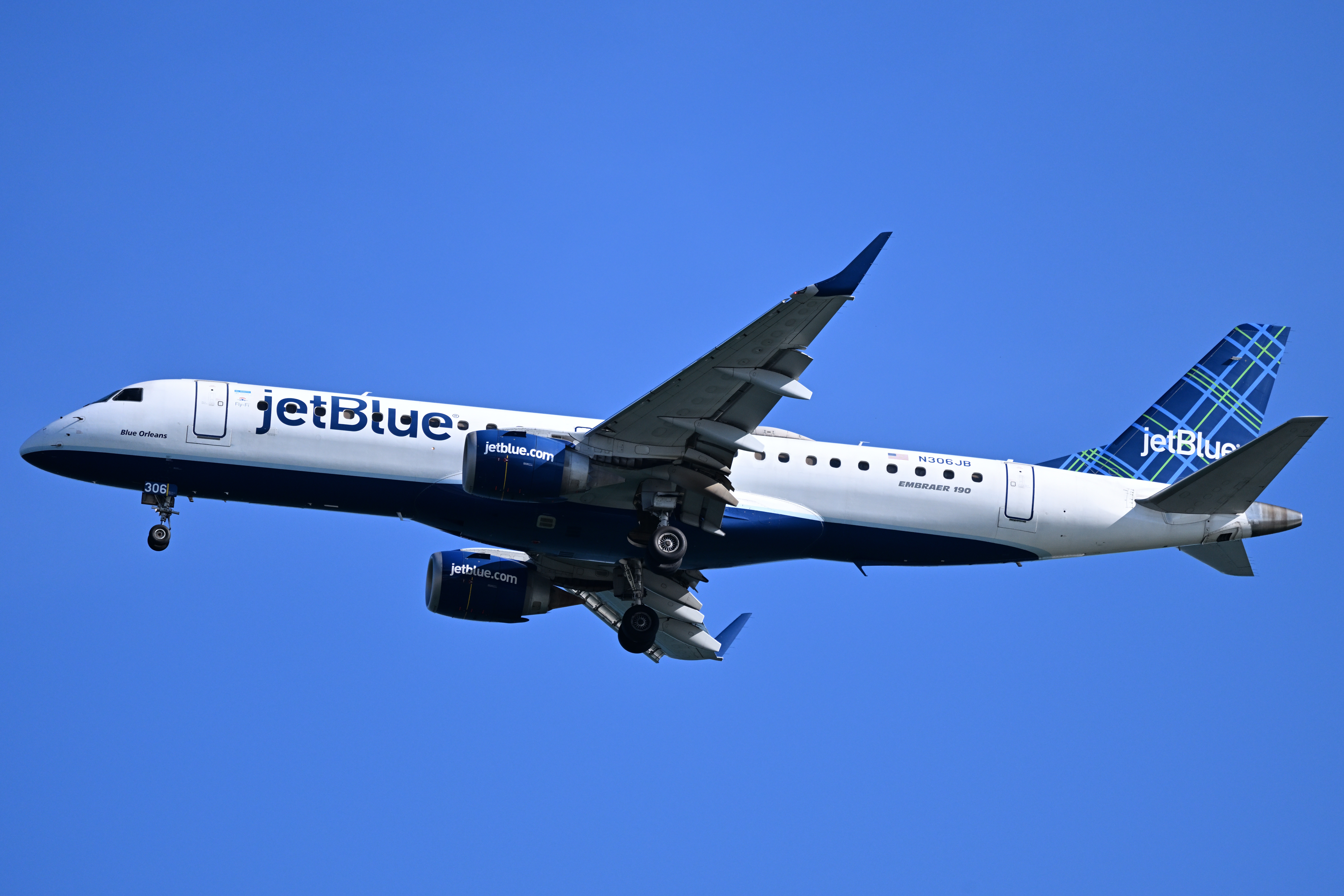
Embraer E190

JetBlue used to operate the following aircraft types:

JetBlue historical fleet
Aircraft	Total	Introduced	Retired	Replacement	Notes
Embraer E190	63	2005	2025	Airbus A220-300	Launch customer

== Product ==
=== Seating ===
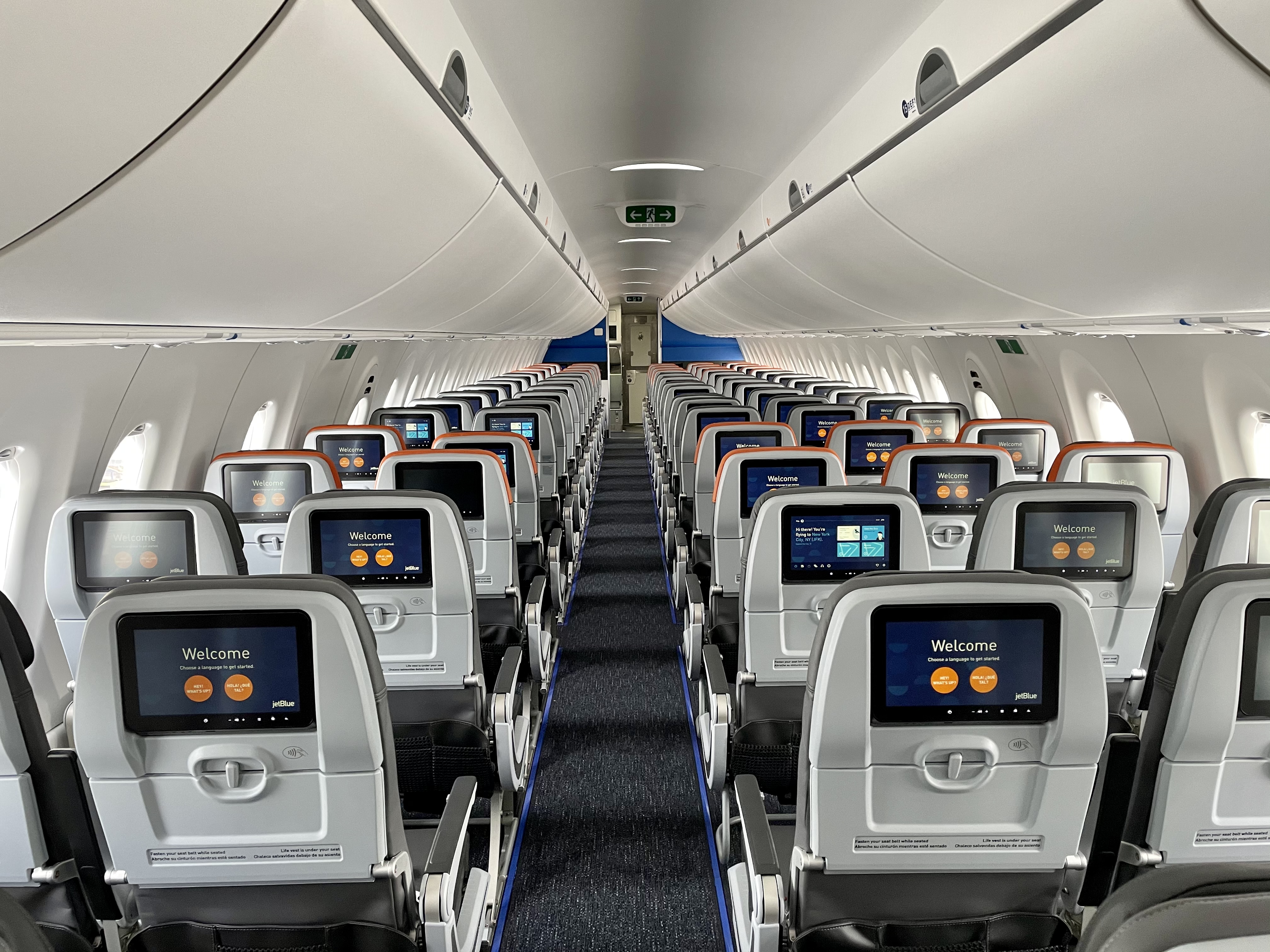
The Core cabin in a JetBlue A220

On most of its aircraft, JetBlue offers a uniquely unified cabin experience called Core. In Core, some rows offer Customers 7 extra inches of legroom, referred to as Even More Space seats. The Core cabin includes leather seats, complimentary Wi-Fi, complimentary snacks and non-alcoholic drinks, and entertainment screens with DirecTV, SiriusXM Radio, and movies.

The airline re-styled Core seats in 2014 with the debut of JetBlue's first Airbus A321. The revamped Core seats started to appear on the airline's A320 aircraft in 2018, with further modifications in 2019. This seat design carried over to JetBlue's Airbus A220 aircraft upon launch.

==== Mint ====
In 2014, the airline introduced its version of a business class cabin, called Mint. The service was originally available only on transcontinental domestic routes on select Airbus A321s starting in 2014. The seat design includes fully lie-flat seats, some of which have sliding panels for more privacy.

Mint has since been expanded to select Caribbean routes, and in 2021, a newly reimagined version of the service and seating was announced.

=== In-flight entertainment ===
JetBlue's in-flight entertainment options consist of gate-to-gate Fly-Fi internet access, over 100 channels of DIRECTV, Sirius XM Radio, and movies, and on the Airbus A321 and newer retrofitted Airbus A320 aircraft, a 15-inch interactive video screen which is not available on the rest of the fleet. JetBlue's partnership with Amazon lets customers watch Amazon Prime videos by connecting to Wi-Fi and downloading the Amazon Video app on their mobile phone or tablet.

The in-flight Wi-Fi under the "Fly-Fi" network is complimentary on all flights, at speeds of 12–15 megabits per second.

=== Frequent-flyer program ===
JetBlue's frequent-flyer program is called TrueBlue. Under the original TrueBlue program, flights were worth two, four, or six points based on distance of the flights, and double points were awarded for flights booked online.

In September 2009, JetBlue made changes to its TrueBlue program. In the new program, members receive three points for every dollar spent toward a flight, excluding taxes and fees, plus an additional three points for every dollar spent on a flight if booked online directly on the JetBlue.com website. Additional points are awarded if the member uses the Barclay's issued JetBlue Mastercard credit card to purchase the flight. The price of flights in points depend on the fare of the flight in U.S. dollars. The new program launched on November 9, 2009.

In June 2013, JetBlue announced that TrueBlue points will never expire for any reason.

In May 2023, JetBlue overhauled its TrueBlue Loyalty Program with enhancing its top tier status Mosaic with a 4-tier status and pick your own perks offers.

=== Lounges ===
In September 2024, JetBlue announced the upcoming opening of two BlueHouse-branded lounges.

== Corporate affairs ==
=== Business trends ===
The key trends for JetBlue are (as of the financial year ending December 31):

	Revenue (in million US$)	Employees (FTE)	Passengers (in millions)	Average fare (US$)	Load factor (%)	Aircraft	Ref.
2015	677	16,862	35.1	167	84.7	215	
2016	759	18,406	38.3	166	85.1	227	
2017	1,147	19,978	40.0	168	84.3	243	
2018	189	20,892	42.1	175	84.8	253	
2019	569	21,569	42.7	182	84.0	259	
2020	(1,354)	20,742	14.3	191	56.9	267	
2021	(182)	19,466	30.1	186	76.0	282	
2022	(362)	20,901	39.6	217	81.5	290	
2023	(310)	23,388	42.5	211	82.6	300	
2024	(795)	23,000	40.5	212	83.2	290	
2025	(602)	23,000	39.3	211	82.4	288	

=== Headquarters and offices ===
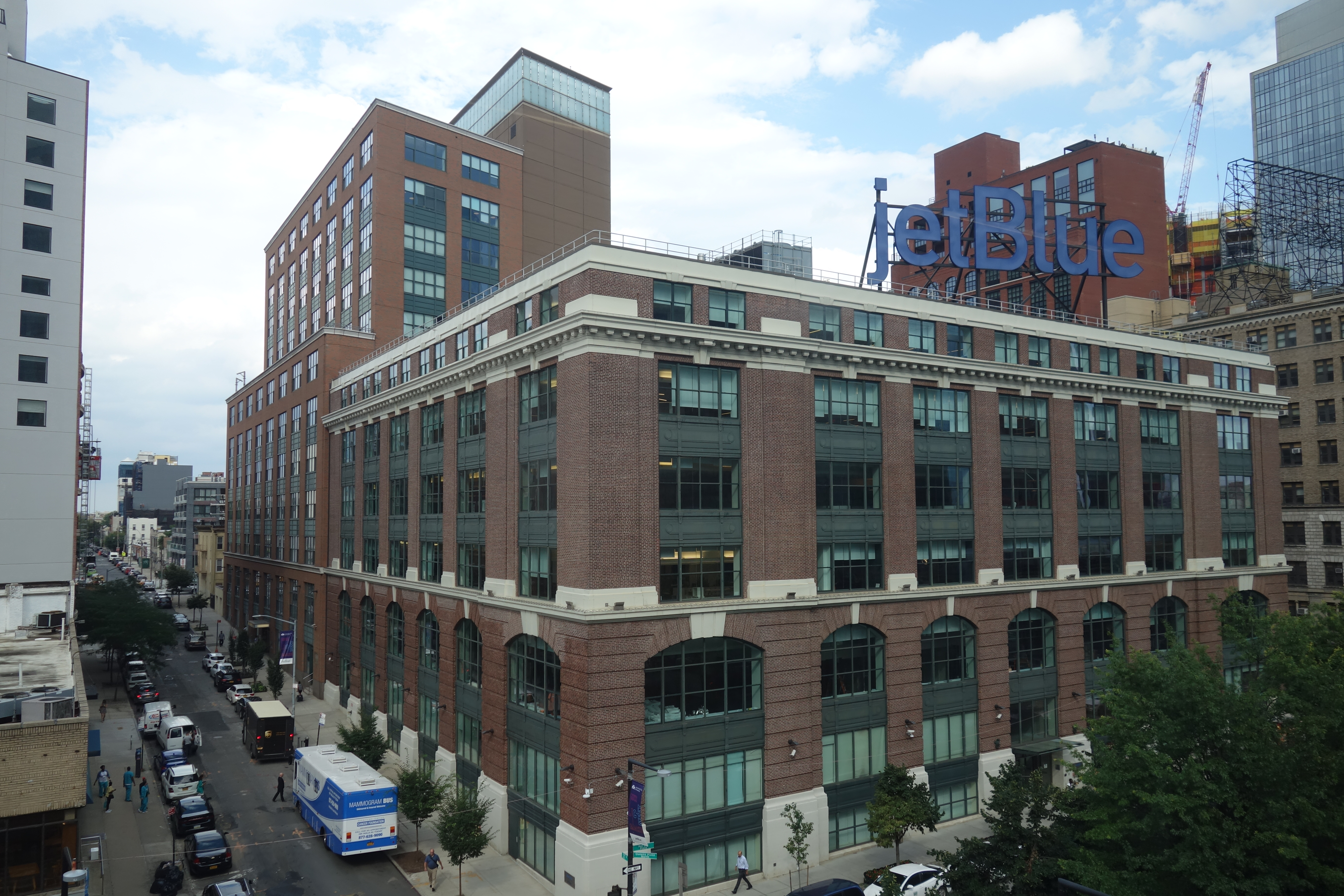
JetBlue's current headquarters, at the Brewster Building at 27-01 Queens Plaza North

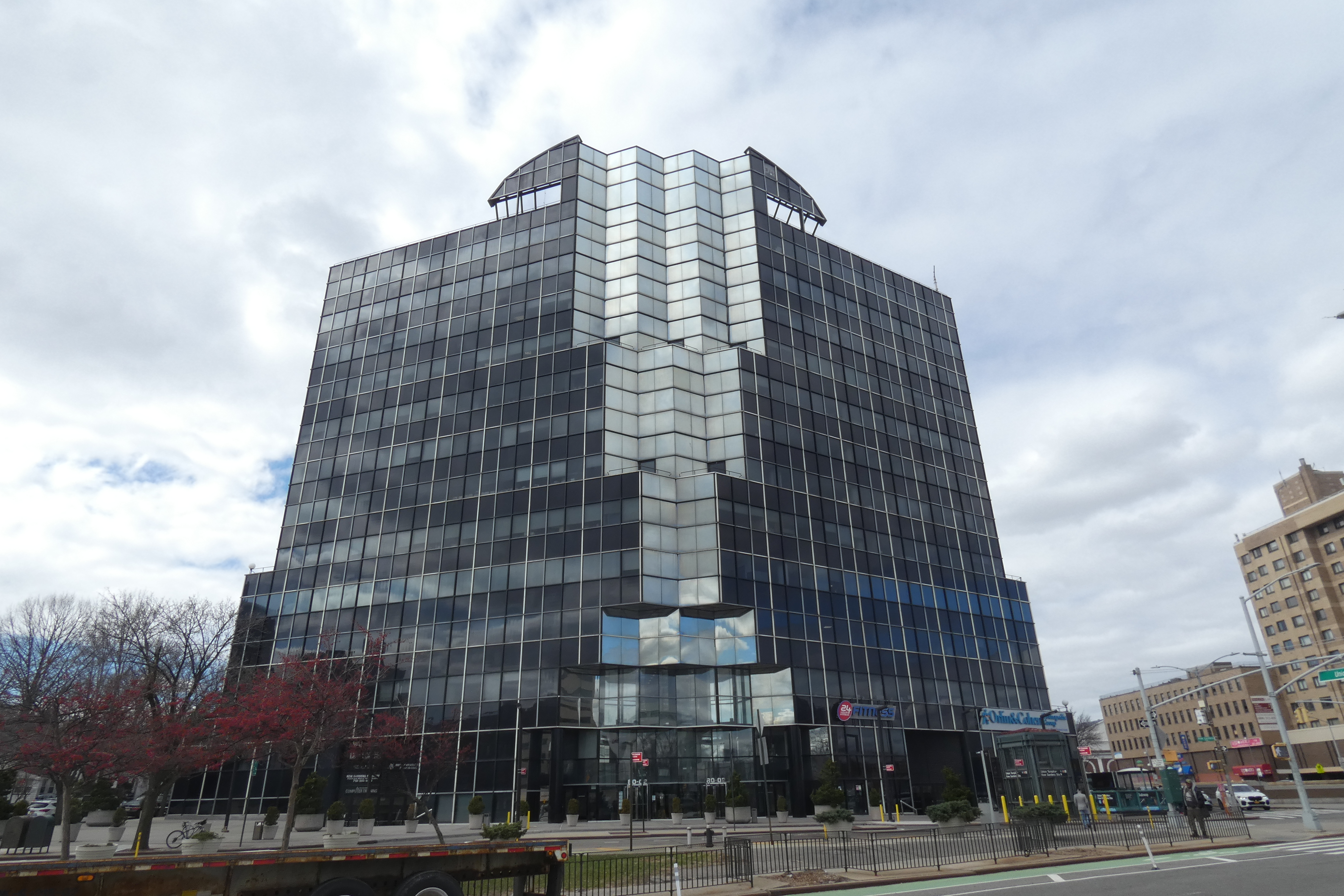
JetBlue's former headquarters at 80-02 Kew Gardens Road

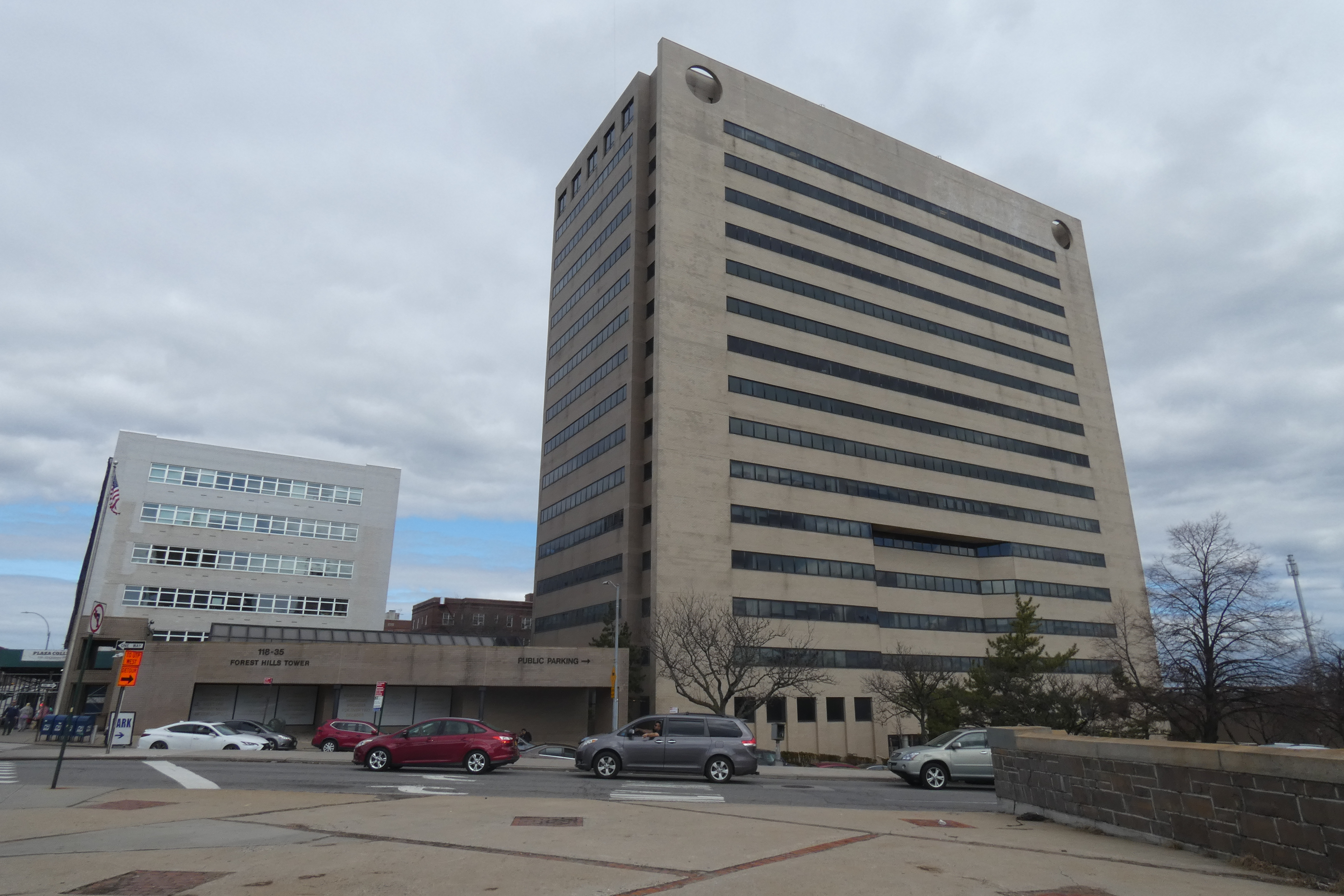
JetBlue's former headquarters at 118-35 Queens Boulevard

JetBlue has had its headquarters in various locations in the Queens borough of New York City. Currently they are housed in the Brewster Building in Long Island City—a building designed by architects Stephenson & Wheeler for the Brewster automobile factory in 1911. JetBlue previously had its headquarters at 80–02 Kew Gardens Road, and then in the Forest Hills Tower, both in Forest Hills.

JetBlue also maintains field offices in Cottonwood Heights, Utah and in Orlando (which is on the property of Orlando International Airport and houses the airline's training academy).

=== Leadership ===
JetBlue's current leadership team is as follows:

- Chairman: Peter Boneparth (since May 2020)
- Chief executive officer: Joanna Geraghty (since February 2024)
- President: Marty St. George (since February 2024)

==== Former chairman of the board ====
1. David Neeleman (1998–2008)
2. Joel Peterson (2008–2020)

==== Former chief executive officers ====
1. David Neeleman (1998–2007)
2. David Barger (2007–2015)
3. Robin Hayes (2015–2024)

=== Business model ===
JetBlue operates with most of the features of a low-cost carrier (LCC), for example (and as referred to in their Annual Report), a fleet of new and efficient aircraft of (mainly) one model, high aircraft utilization, point-to-point routes (with several aircraft bases), relatively low distribution costs, and without membership of a major airline alliance.

However, in JetBlue's business model, the airline offers more than one class of cabin, provides free in-flight entertainment and refreshments, and maintains codeshare agreements with several other airlines.

Researchers from the Massachusetts Institute of Technology coined the term "JetBlue Effect" in 2013, describing how fares would drop after JetBlue entered a market.

=== Marketing strategy ===
JetBlue's first major advertising campaign incorporated phrases like "Unbelievable" and "We like you, too". Full-page newspaper advertisements boasted low fares, new aircraft, leather seats, spacious legroom, and a customer-service-oriented staff committed to "bringing humanity back to air travel". JetBlue became the first airline to offer all passengers personalized in-flight entertainment. In April 2000, flat-screen monitors installed in every seatback allowed customers live access to over 20 DirecTV channels at no additional cost.

As JetBlue gained market share, they found a position where they competed with other low-cost carriers as well as major carriers. Amenities such as their live in-flight television, free and unlimited snack offerings, comfortable legroom, and unique promotions fostered an image of impeccable customer service that rivaled the major airlines, while competitive low fares made them a threat to low-cost, no-frills carriers as well.

In May 2025, JetBlue and United Airlines announced a partnership called "Blue Sky." The agreement allows members of each airline's frequent flyer program to earn and redeem miles on both carriers and access reciprocal elite benefits, including priority boarding, complimentary checked baggage, and same-day flight changes. The partnership also includes cross-selling of flights on each airline's website. Beginning in 2027, United is expected to resume service at New York's JFK Airport with up to seven daily round-trip flights using JetBlue-provided slots. Subject to regulatory approval, the partnership is scheduled to begin implementation in late 2025.

=== Subsidiaries and investments ===
==== JetBlue Ventures ====
JetBlue Ventures is the airlines venture capital subsidiary. It was established in February 2016 as JetBlue Technology Ventures (JTV). The subsidiary's primary objective is to invests in and partners with early-stage startups in the travel, hospitality, and transportation space with a mission is to improve the end-to-end experience of travelers everywhere.

As of November 2018, JTV has invested in 21 startups, including hybrid planes, machine learning algorithms, and ground transportation. Investments range in size from $250,000 to $1 million. JetBlue Technology Ventures, along with Toyota Ventures and Parley for the Oceans, is among the corporate investors that have invested $40 million in the Air Company, a carbon negative vodka distiller and perfume and hand sanitizer manufacturer that uses heterogeneous catalysis to convert captured carbon into ethanol.

In May 2025, JetBlue sold the JetBlue Ventures subsidiary to SKY Leasing.

===== Universal Hydrogen =====
In 2021, JetBlue became the first airline to invest in practical hydrogen-powered flight through its partnership with Universal Hydrogen, a company working on retrofitting current aircraft with tools to allow them to fly on hydrogen power. The company focuses on distributing fuel through modular capsules transported on the existing intermodal freight network, offsetting the need to retrofit airports with their own hydrogen fuel farms. JetBlue's initial investment helped Universal Hydrogen accelerate development and production of its regional aircraft conversion kits.

Universal Hydrogen began its initial rounds of testing in 2022 with an ATR 72.

==== Paisly ====
Paisly (formerly known as JetBlue Travel Products) is a subsidiary of JetBlue Airways, established in 2018 with the primary objective of expanding the airline's offerings beyond air travel. Recognizing the growing demand for comprehensive travel services, JetBlue created this wholly owned subsidiary to specialize in non-air products and enhance the overall travel experience for its customers. The current products Paisly offers is JetBlue Vacations (vacation packages) and TrueBlue Travel (unbundled, non-air travel products). Current leading Paisly is President Jamie Perry.

In 2020, JetBlue Vacations underwent a significant transformation, introducing new and improved personalization features and perks. This revamp aimed to distinguish JetBlue Vacations as a premier option for travelers seeking tailored vacation packages which include bundled flights, hotels, cruises and more.

In 2021, JetBlue Travel Products launched Paisly by JetBlue. A homegrown platform represented the airline's expansion into selling non-air travel products, effectively extending the airline's service and loyalty program beyond flights. Paisly offers hotels, car rentals, activities and travel bags.

In June 2025, JetBlue Travel Products was renamed Paisly.

In August 2025, Paisly by JetBlue was relaunched as TrueBlue Travel, named after the airline loyalty program TrueBlue.

==== LiveTV ====
LiveTV was wholly acquired by JetBlue in 2002. It provided seat back entertainment systems with Live Satellite Television and Live Satellite Radio to airlines including JetBlue. The subsidiary was sold to Thales for nearly $400 million in June 2014.

==== JSX ====
On October 25, 2016, the airline JSX (then branded as JetSuiteX) announced that JetBlue had made a minority equity investment in the airline. Part of the agreement also gave JetBlue a seat on JetSuite's board of directors. Reasons for the investment was outlined by CEO Robin Hayes, stating, "Our investment in JetSuite makes sense as we continue to execute on our west coast plan and invest in innovative ideas that reflect the disruptive spirit of JetBlue." In JetBlue's first quarter 2018 investor call, JetBlue's CFO Steven Priest confirmed the airline held about 10% of JetSuiteX. The airline was rebranded from JetSuiteX to JSX in August 2019.

==== TWA Flight Center Hotel ====
The TWA Hotel is the TWA Flight Center structure at JFK airport that was rebuilt into 505-room hotel. The hotel preserves the Eero Saarinen TWA head house while replacing the structures on either side of the head house. Situated in front of JetBlue's JFK terminal, JetBlue has 5–10% ownership of the hotel. The hotel is an effective replacement for the Ramada Plaza JFK Hotel on the north end of the airport grounds in Building 144, which closed in 2009.

== Accidents and incidents ==
As of 2025, JetBlue has never had a fatal crash, and only a few minor incidents:

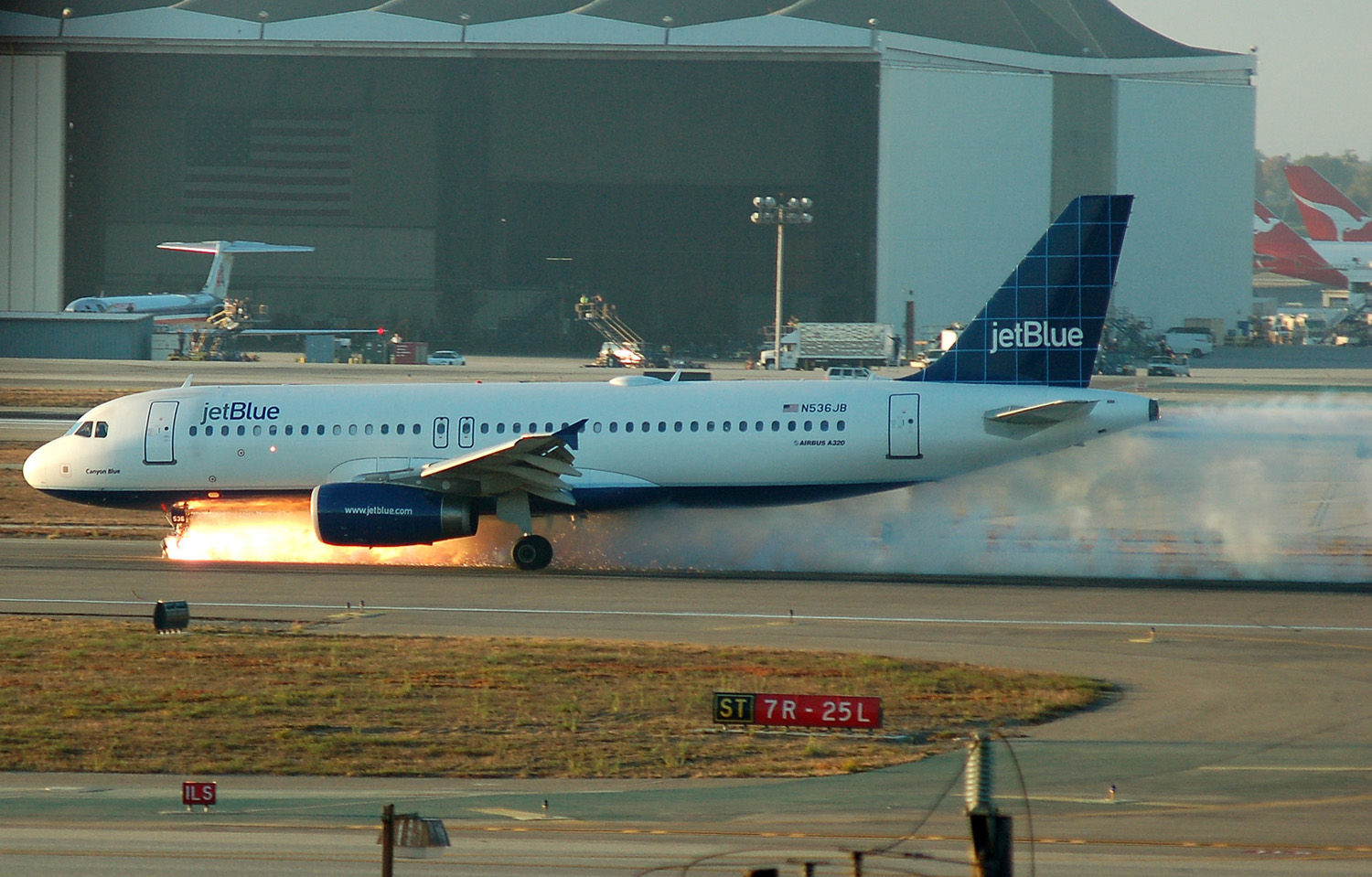
JetBlue Flight 292, an Airbus A320 (N536JB), makes an emergency landing at LAX.

- September 21, 2005: Flight 292, an Airbus A320-200, en route from Bob Hope Airport in Burbank to New York JFK Airport, performed an emergency landing at Los Angeles International Airport (pictured) following a failure of the nose landing gear during retraction when it turned 90 degrees. The plane landed after flying in a holding pattern in air for about three hours to burn fuel and therefore lighten the aircraft. The aircraft came to a stop without incident on runway 25L, the second-longest runway at LAX. The only apparent damage to the plane upon landing was the destruction of the front wheels, which were ground down to almost semicircles, and the tires; the front landing strut held. No one sustained injuries, and the aircraft was repaired and returned to service.
- August 9, 2010: an incident occurred on board Flight 1052, from Pittsburgh to New York City on board an Embraer E190 registered N274JB. A veteran flight attendant, Steven Slater announced over the intercom that he was abused by a passenger and he was quitting his job. He then stole and drank two beers before deploying the emergency slide and sliding down. The same flight attendant then claimed to be injured by the woman as he was instructing her to sit down. Slater later attempted to reapply for his job but failed.
- March 27, 2012: Flight 191, an Airbus A320-200, en route from New York JFK Airport to McCarran International Airport in Las Vegas, performed an emergency landing at Rick Husband Amarillo International Airport after the captain, Clayton Osbon, was locked out of the cockpit and subdued by passengers after he started acting erratically and ranting about terrorists. It is believed that Osbon suffered from an unspecified mental breakdown; he was later treated by Northwest Texas Healthcare System. There were no fatalities.
- January 22, 2022: Flight 1748, an Airbus A320-200, en route from Yampa Valley Regional Airport to Fort Lauderdale–Hollywood International Airport, sustained a tailstrike during takeoff while trying to avoid an oncoming Beechcraft Super King Air 350 that was landing on the opposite side of the runway. The aircraft was diverted to Denver International Airport with no injuries among the 108 people on board. The aircraft was substantially damaged, and was repaired and brought back into service.
- January 6, 2025: Two people were discovered dead in the landing gear of Flight 1801 during a post flight routine inspection at Fort Lauderdale-Hollywood International Airport.
- On June 12, 2025, Flight 312 from Chicago skidded off runway 33‑L at Boston Logan (A220), prompting an FAA investigation. No injuries were reported, but operations were halted and over 1,190 flights delayed.
- On October 30, 2025: An incident on JetBlue Flight 1230 with an A320-family aircraft revealed that intense solar radiation may corrupt data critical to the functioning of flight controls which led to the aircraft losing altitude very quickly. More than 15 passengers were injured and taken to the hospital after the October incident, and the aircraft was diverted to Tampa, Florida. The incident led to Airbus issuing an urgent airworthiness directive in line with European Union Aviation Safety Agency grounding at least 6,000 Airbus A320-family aircraft temporarily throughout the globe in order to fix the issue with a software update.

== See also ==
- Aviation in the United States
