= JetBlue Mint =

Premium cabin offering of JetBlue Airways

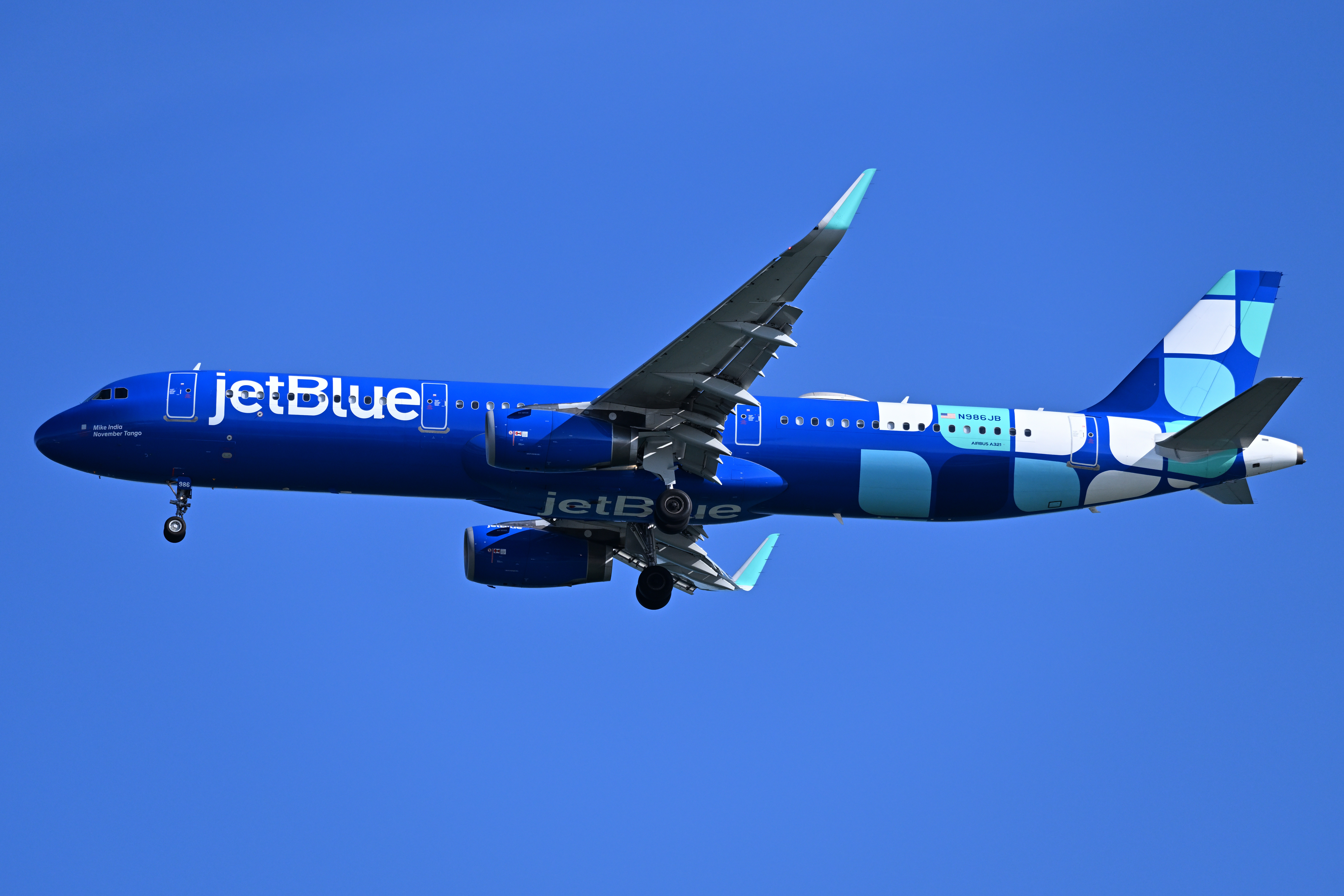
N986JB "Mike India November Tango", one of JetBlue's Airbus A321 aircraft used for Mint flights

Mint is a business class airline product offered by JetBlue on some flights between the West Coast and the East Coast of the contiguous United States, seasonally on some flights between the United States and Caribbean destinations, as well to Vancouver International Airport in Canada, London Heathrow, London Gatwick, Edinburgh Airport in the United Kingdom, Charles de Gaulle Airport in France, Madrid–Barajas Airport in Spain, Amsterdam Airport Schiphol in the Netherlands, and Dublin Airport in Ireland. The service is operated with a fleet of Airbus A321 aircraft in a premium configuration, with lie-flat seats in business class.

== History ==
JetBlue first announced its intention to introduce premium seats on some of its transcontinental flights in March 2013. The company officially announced Mint on September 30, 2013, between New York and San Francisco and Los Angeles, with fares starting at US$599 each way. Dave Barger, JetBlue's CEO, said that the move was necessary as its competitors were offering lie-flat seats in transcontinental markets, leaving JetBlue with an all-economy cabin. The routes were to be operated with new Airbus A321 aircraft and feature Wi-Fi connectivity. JetBlue's daily Mint service between New York and Los Angeles were to begin by the fourth quarter of 2014, and all five daily round-trip flights between New York and San Francisco by early 2015. The first Mint flight, from New York–JFK to Los Angeles, was to begin on June 15, 2014.

On March 15, 2015, JetBlue announced seasonal expansion of Mint to Caribbean routes, with service from JFK Airport to Aruba and Barbados. The service was to operate once daily per destination during the winter holiday season, and once weekly per destination for the rest of the winter season. JetBlue announced expansion of its Mint service to Boston in June 2015, with year-round service from Boston to Los Angeles and San Francisco, and seasonal Saturday-only service from Boston to Barbados. Flights from Boston to San Francisco began on March 24, 2016, and flights from Boston to Los Angeles were to begin on October 20, 2016.

On April 12, 2016, JetBlue announced an expansion of its Mint service. More routes utilizing the Mint configuration were to be launched to Fort Lauderdale, Las Vegas, San Diego and Seattle, with service beginning during 2017 and 2018. The announcement was made almost immediately after Alaska Air Group announced its intention to acquire Virgin America and merge it with Alaska Airlines. Either Alaska or Virgin operated in 4 out of 7 of JetBlue's newly announced markets.

In February 2021, JetBlue announced a redesigned Mint business class. The redesigned suites appear on A321 NEOs and LRs. In the first row, called Mint Studio, there is a larger suite with space for up to two people and travelers get extra benefits. The first row starts at $199 more than the rest of the cabin.

== Service ==
The Mint sub fleet consists of A321 aircraft with 159 seats, including 16 flat-bed Mint seats. The Mint seat is a version of the Thompson Aero Vantage business class seat, with extra storage and dual 120 V + USB power outlets at every seat. 4 of the 16 Mint seats are mini-suites, which include a sliding door for privacy. The seats have a width of up to 22.3 inches (57 cm) and can convert to a flat bed of up to 6 ft 8 in (203 cm) in length. Pairs of non-suite Mint seats alternate with single mini-suite seats. The seats use air cushioning, allowing passengers to adjust the firmness of the seats. Economy class on Mint A321 aircraft uses B/E Aerospace Pinnacle slimline seats, with a seat pitch of 33 inches (84 cm) in the main cabin and up to 37 inches (94 cm) in the "EvenMore" extra legroom product. There are two power outlets per row of economy-class seats.

A 15.6-inch (40 cm) video screen provides Live TV 4.0, SiriusXM Radio, and some films as in-flight entertainment. The TV system provides about 100 DirecTV channels. On flights outside the coverage range of satellite TV, TV channels and radio are not provided. In-flight Wi-Fi is provided via a Ka-band satellite system.

Passengers receive in-flight meal service. Amenity kits are provided by CARRA, with other companies.

== Routes ==
As of 2025, JetBlue Mint has routes to cities in the United States, Canada, Latin America, the Caribbean, United Kingdom, France, Ireland, the Netherlands, and Spain.
