= David Barger =

American businessman

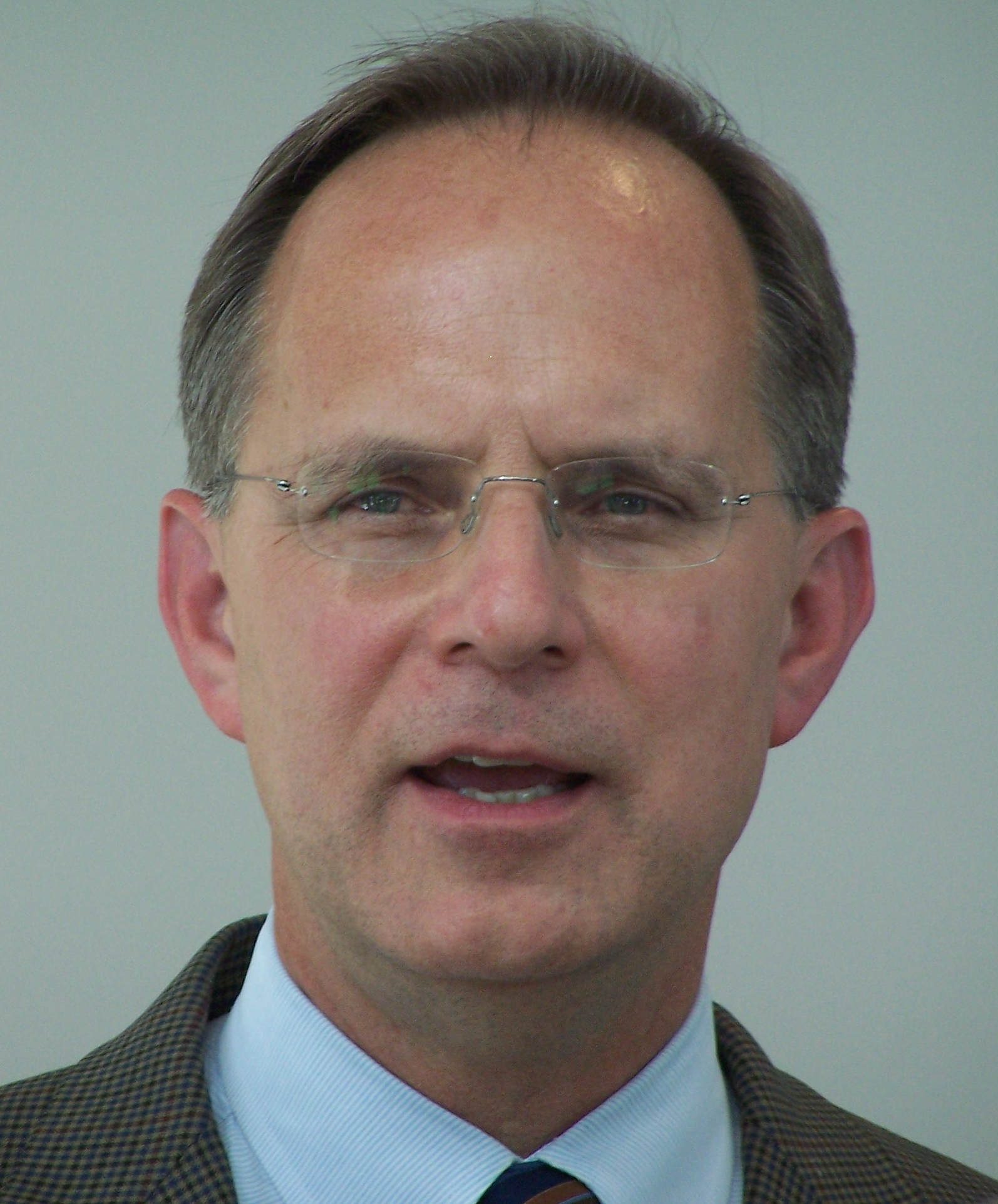
- Barger in 2010
- Born: David J. Barger; 1958 (age 67–68); Southfield, Michigan, US
- Education: University of Michigan
- Occupations: Former president and CEO of JetBlue
- Predecessor: David Neeleman
- Successor: Robin Hayes

David J. Barger (born 1958) is an American businessman, and one of the co-founders of JetBlue. He was the airline's chief executive officer (CEO) until his ouster in February 2015. He had been part of JetBlue's founding team and was on the board of directors. Barger is now an operating partner at Connor Capital SB.

== Career ==
Barger's interest in airlines came from his father, who was a United Airlines pilot for 37 years. From 1982 to 1988, Barger served in a number of positions with New York Air, such as the Director of Stations. In 1992, he joined with Continental Airlines and held various management positions, including vice president of Continental's Newark Liberty International Airport hub.

Barger was one of the first employees of JetBlue Airways in 1998, and served as the chief operating officer until March 2007. Following a February 2007 incident in which the airline was forced to cancel nearly 1,700 flights due to winter storms, JetBlue's board of directors replaced founder and Chief Executive Officer David Neeleman with Barger. He had politicked the board, while Neeleman was busy publicly apologizing. Barger's ascendancy caused widespread demoralization in the ranks. He became JetBlue's new Chief Executive Officer on May 10, 2007. Neeleman, the company's founder and largest individual investor, became a nonexecutive chairman as a result of the change. On June 1, 2009, Barger became the president of JetBlue.

On September 18, 2014, Barger announced his resignation from the company effective February 16, 2015, following several reports that investors and the board were unhappy with the lagging stock price and Barger's performance. He was replaced on the board and as CEO by Robin Hayes. The stock price increased rapidly after Barger's removal was announced.

Barger has been a non-executive director of AIM Aviation Ltd since February 2014. He has been a director of gategroup Holding AG since April 2015, and is a director at The Partnership for New York City, Inc. He is a member of the board of governors at International Air Transport Association (IATA). He joined the boards of Kaiser Foundation Hospitals and Kaiser Foundation Health Plan, Inc. in May 2017, and is a member of the Governance, Accountability and Nominating Committee, and the finance committee.
