= Marine Air Terminal =

Terminal at LaGuardia Airport in New York City

- U.S. National Register of Historic Places
- New York State Register of Historic Places
- New York City Landmark
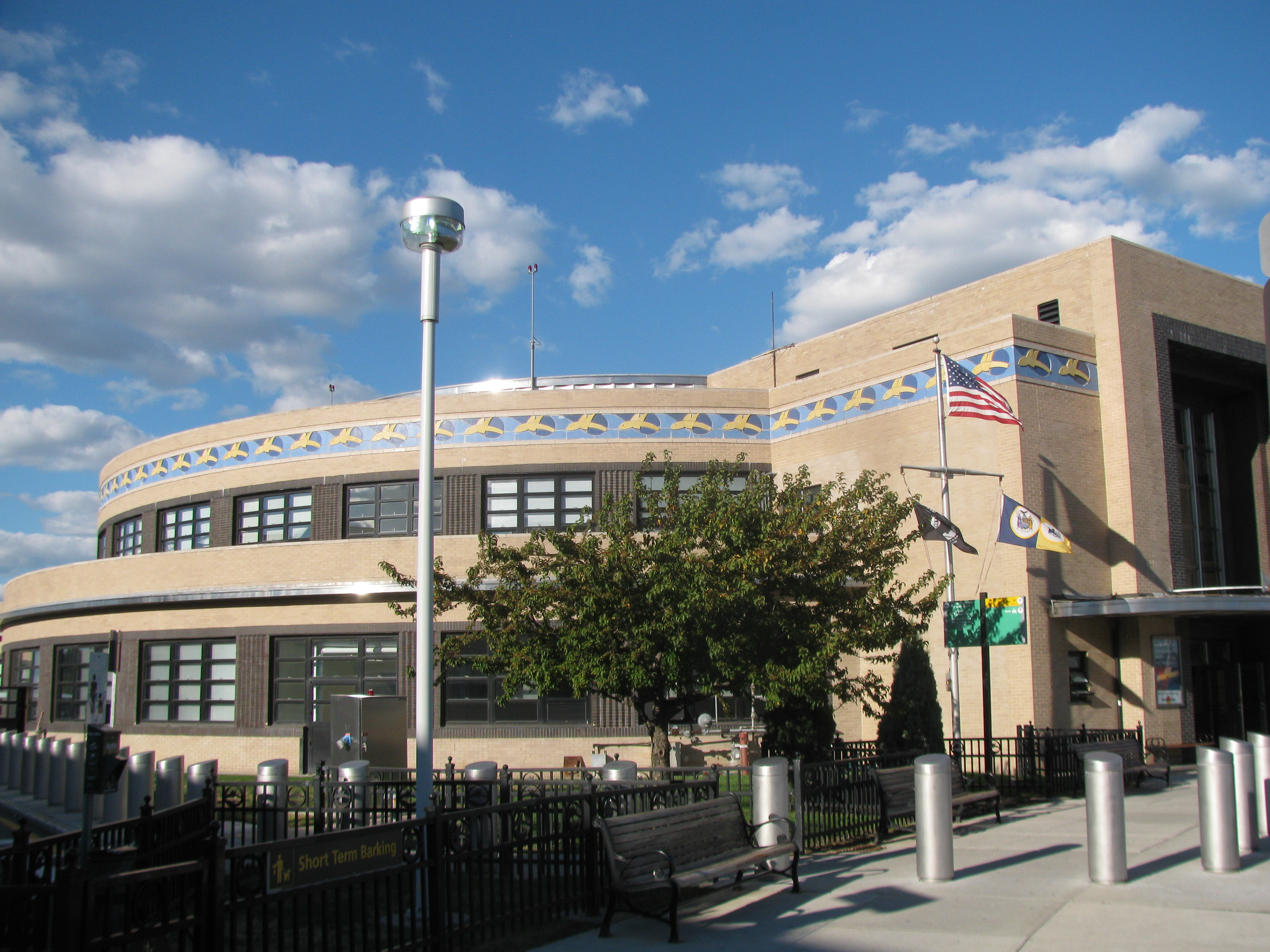
- Facade of the Marine Air Terminal
- Interactive map of Marine Air Terminal
- Location: LaGuardia Airport, Queens, New York
- Coordinates: 40°46′25″N 73°53′09″W
- Area: less than one acre
- Built: 1939
- Architect: William Delano
- Architectural style: Art Deco
- NRHP reference No.: 82003397
- NYSRHP No.: 08101.006415
- NYCL No.: 1109, 1110

Significant dates
- Added to NRHP: July 9, 1982
- Designated NYSRHP: May 12, 1982
- Designated NYCL: November 25, 1980

The Marine Air Terminal (also known as Terminal A) is an airport terminal at LaGuardia Airport in Queens, New York City, United States. Its main building, designed in the Art Deco style by William Delano of the firm Delano & Aldrich, opened in 1940. The terminal was built to handle Pan Am's fleet of flying boats, the Boeing 314 Clippers, which landed on the nearby Bowery Bay. Technological advances after World War II made the Clippers obsolete, and the Marine Air Terminal was renovated in 1946 to serve conventional planes. As of May 2026, the terminal is vacant following the cessation of operations by Spirit Airlines, its sole tenant.

The Marine Air Terminal was LaGuardia Airport's original terminal for overseas flights. It was highly popular in the 1940s, when LaGuardia was the only major airport in the U.S. which offered regular flights to Europe. Traffic dropped drastically after the larger Idlewild Airport opened in 1948, and Clippers stopped serving the terminal in 1952. The terminal then served as the airport's general aviation terminal for more than three decades, except for a short period in the 1950s, when it was used by Northeast Airlines. The Pan Am Shuttle service started operating from Marine Air Terminal in 1986. Delta Air Lines took over the service in 1991, operating Delta Shuttle flights from the terminal until 2017, after which it was used by various carriers. The terminal has been renovated multiple times throughout its history.

The main terminal building consists of a two-story circular core with a projecting entrance pavilion and a pair of two-story wings. The brick facade is painted buff, with black details, and contains a frieze that depicts flying fish. The three-story rectangular entrance pavilion contains a canopy and a set of doors leading to the terminal's main rotunda. The rotunda contains marble floors and walls, as well as the Flight mural by James Brooks. Both the interior and the exterior of the main building were designated as New York City landmarks in 1980, and the structure was added to the National Register of Historic Places in 1982. In addition, there was a hangar for seaplanes next to the main building, which has been converted into a garage for snow-removal vehicles.

== History ==
Following Charles Lindbergh's transatlantic flight in 1927, commercial air travel in the United States increased during the 1930s. New York City was in dire need of a new airport by 1934, after Fiorello H. La Guardia was elected mayor. Angered that a flight on which he was a passenger landed in Newark, New Jersey, even though his ticket said "New York", LaGuardia pushed New Yorkers to support the construction of an airport in New York City itself. The city did have a public airport, Floyd Bennett Field in Brooklyn, but it was further from Midtown Manhattan than Newark Airport was. After commencing several studies on the feasibility of a new airport in New York City, the La Guardia administration decided to redevelop the existing North Beach Airport in Queens. The city government leased North Beach Airport in 1934.

=== Development ===
La Guardia's administration presented plans for a renovation of North Beach Airport (now LaGuardia Airport) in August 1937. The plans included a terminal for seaplanes along Bowery Bay, on the western side of the airport, as well as a terminal for land planes along Flushing Bay, on the eastern side. The seaplane terminal, to be known as the Marine Air Terminal, was to contain four hangars, an administrative building, and a machine shop. The administrative building was to be a circular brick-and-steel edifice measuring 38 feet (12 m) tall and about 136 feet (41 m) across. A baggage check, customs and immigration offices, an air traffic control tower, and various other offices would be centered around a main waiting room, and there would be access ramps for seaplane passengers. The seaplane and land-plane terminals, both designed by the firm of Delano & Aldrich, would operate independently of each other. The Works Progress Administration (WPA) would provide federal funding for the project.

U.S. president Franklin D. Roosevelt approved plans for the airport on September 3, 1937, and La Guardia participated in a groundbreaking ceremony for the airport six days later. The airport was originally projected to cost $15 million and be completed in time for the opening of the 1939 New York World's Fair. By July 1938, the WPA employed 7,800 workers on the project, and workers were expanding the airport site through land reclamation. The number of workers had increased to 11,500 by that November, and the cost had increased to $29 million. Prior to the opening of the seaplane terminal, in early 1939, The New York Times reported that flying boats from England, France, Germany, and the United States would be using the terminal. The terminal had been planned with two seaplane hangars, but only one hangar was built at the time; that hangar was nearly complete by April 1939.

The expanded North Beach Airport opened on October 15, 1939, and was officially renamed the New York Municipal Airport–LaGuardia Field later that year. Covering 558 acres (226 ha) with nearly 4 miles (6.4 km) of runways, the airport cost $40 million, making it the largest and most expensive in the world at that time. The seaplane terminal comprised $7.5 million of this cost, and the hangar alone cost $2 million. The land-plane section of the airport opened for commercial flights on December 2, 1939, but the completion of the marine terminal was delayed until March 1940. This was in part because construction in Bowery Bay had prevented seaplanes from landing there. Seaplanes instead traveled to bases in Port Washington, New York, and in Baltimore, Maryland.

=== Pan Am use ===
At a hearing before the Civil Aeronautics Board in April 1939, Pan American Airways indicated that it planned to use North Beach Airport as the main U.S. terminal for the transatlantic flights of its Boeing 314 Clippers. Under this plan, Clippers would fly to Baltimore if there was bad weather in New York City. Pan Am leased the Marine Air Terminal from the New York City government the following month. Pan Am also allowed foreign airlines to use the terminal, including Imperial Airways, Air France, and KLM.

==== Opening and early years ====
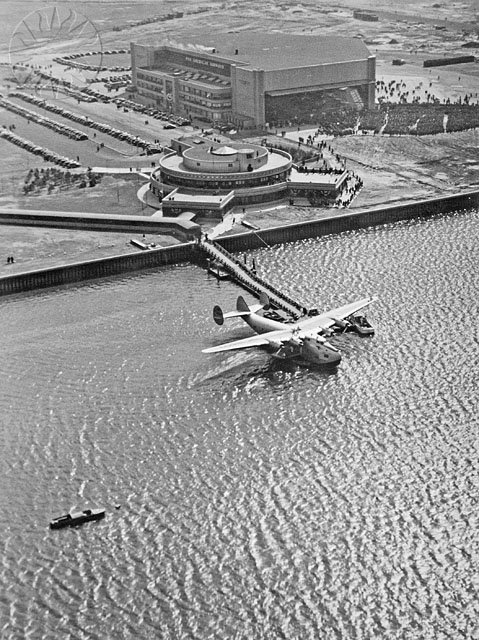
A Boeing 314 Clipper at the Marine Air Terminal c. 1940

The Marine Air Terminal officially opened on March 31, 1940, when a Clipper carrying ten crew members, nine passengers, and over 5,000 pounds (2,300 kg) of mail departed from the terminal. This flight landed in Lisbon, Portugal, 18 hours and 35 minutes later, setting a record for an eastbound transatlantic Clipper flight. The first flying boat to arrive at the Marine Air Terminal arrived from Bermuda on April 1, 1940. At the time, the terminal served three transatlantic trips per week. A brochure distributed on the terminal's opening day proclaimed it as "an enduring terminal linking the air routes of the old world with those of the new". Originally, members of the public were allowed to visit the Marine Air Terminal's observation deck, which became a popular place to observe seaplane and airplane landings. The deck was closed for security reasons during World War II.

In July 1940, American Export Airlines and city officials began discussing the possibility of constructing a second seaplane hangar next to the Marine Air Terminal. American Export wanted to operate a transatlantic passenger route from LaGuardia Airport, but Pan Am did not have any more space in its existing hangar. The New York City Planning Commission approved the proposed hangar in April 1941, allocating $389,000 to the project. LaGuardia attended a groundbreaking ceremony for the second hangar on August 4, 1941, and work on the hangar began that December. James Brooks completed his Flight mural inside the main terminal building in September 1942. The following year, in April 1943, an expansion to the original Pan Am hangar was completed. By then, the Marine Air Terminal had more than one transatlantic trip per day. American Export's new hangar opened in July 1943, and the terminal's observation deck reopened in June 1945.

A New York Herald Tribune article in 1942 noted that Clipper flights came from as far as "Capetown, Lisbon, New Zealand, the Orient, Alaska and other remote places". During the Second World War, many soldiers would fly to Europe and Africa from the terminal, and political figures such as U.S. first lady Eleanor Roosevelt and British prime minister Winston Churchill also flew from the terminal. Even so, the Marine Air Terminal lasted as a seaplane terminal for less than a decade. When the terminal opened, seaplanes were generally more technologically advanced than traditional land planes; the earliest four-engine aircraft, capable of flying long distances, had been seaplanes. However, they were also more prone to disruption, particularly during the winter months and in poor tidal conditions, when they could not operate. Land planes were not affected by these issues, and land-plane technology was also improving quickly. With the outbreak of World War II, new four-engine land planes were being developed, making these seaplanes obsolete. Pan Am stopped operating the 314s into the terminal in June 1945 but continued to operate other service into the terminal.

==== Use as international terminal ====
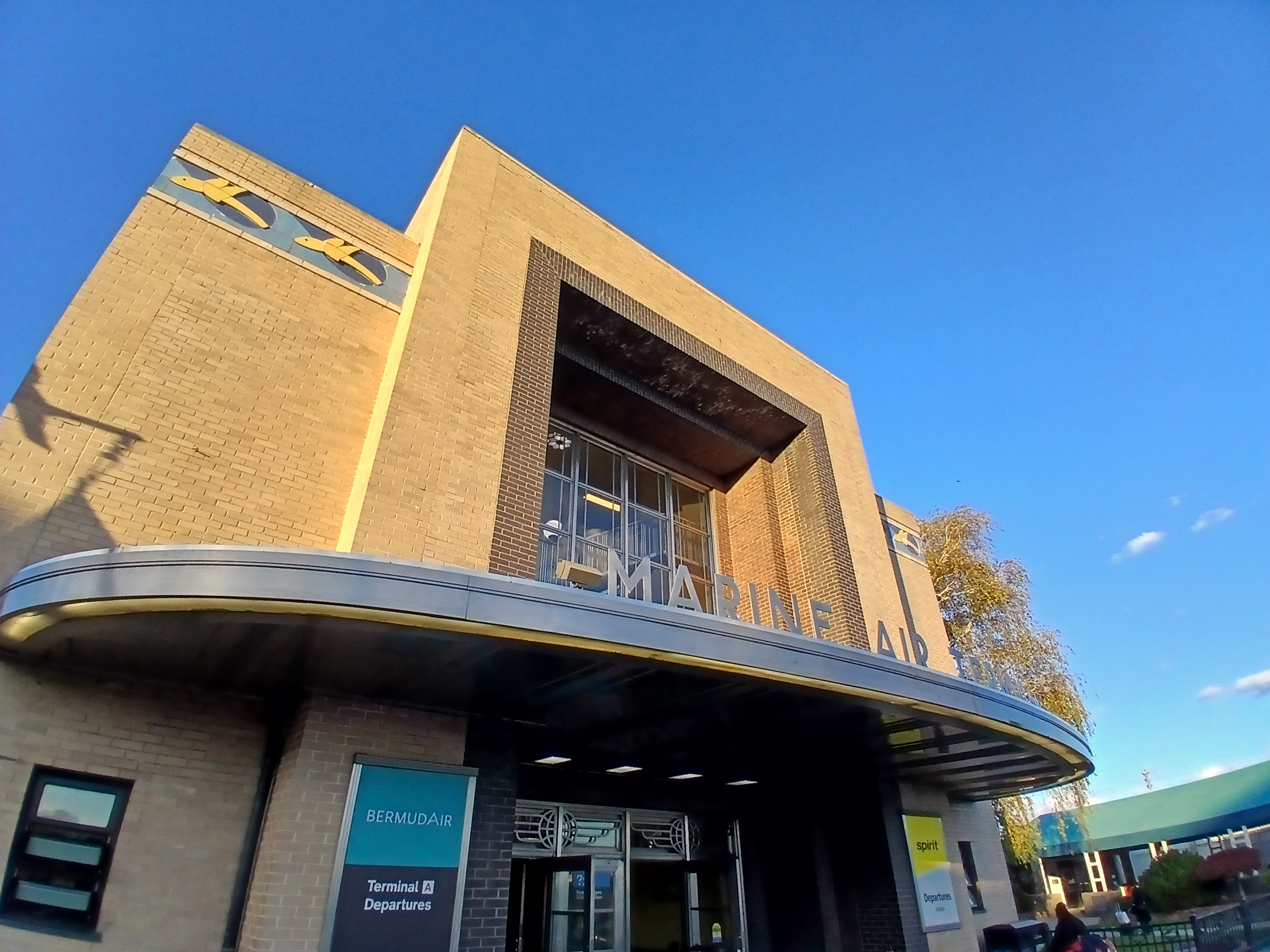
Detail of front entrance

By the mid-1940s, the small capacity of LaGuardia Airport could not handle the increasing demand for international flights. Despite the obsolescence of seaplanes, LaGuardia Airport was the only major airport in the U.S. which offered regular flights to Europe. To address increasing congestion at the Marine Air Terminal, the city government and representatives of several airlines agreed in June 1946 to spend $50,000 on upgrading the customs facilities at the terminal. Although the terminal had begun to serve land planes, it could only fit one plane at a time, and passengers frequently had to wait three to four hours before passing through customs. The Daily Boston Globe wrote that the rotunda often saw as much traffic as a New York City Subway station during rush hours, with up to ten overseas flights trying to land nearly simultaneously at the busiest times. The Marine Air Terminal served 14 airlines; the overcrowded conditions had prompted one airline owner to purchase an old ferryboat and moor it next to the Marine Air Terminal.

The improvements included the addition of a 1,000-foot-long (300 m) covered walkway, three gates for arriving passengers, and two gates for departing passengers. After the terminal reopened on November 7, 1946, it was renamed the International Air Terminal, serving all of LaGuardia's transatlantic flights. Meanwhile, Idlewild (now JFK) Airport was being built in southern Queens to accommodate international and transcontinental flights. The Port of New York Authority took over operation of LaGuardia and Idlewild airports in June 1947. That September, Port Authority officials suggested extending one of LaGuardia's runways by infilling an unused plot of land next to the International Air Terminal. The terminal served 314,000 passengers a year in 1948, many more than it had been built to accommodate.

Air traffic at the terminal started to decline after Idlewild opened in 1948. The terminal was renamed the Overseas Terminal in August 1949 because passengers frequently confused it with Idlewild, which was formally known as New York International Airport. In the years after Idlewild opened, most transatlantic flights at the Overseas Terminal were moved over to Idlewild. The terminal had become empty most of the time, and Pan Am, American Overseas Airlines, and Trans World Airlines were the only airlines still operating international flights from the terminal. Pan Am relocated most of its operations from the terminal in early 1951, and the last transatlantic flight from the Overseas Terminal departed on April 28, 1951. Afterward, only flights to Bermuda continued to operate out of Marine Air Terminal. These flights lasted for less than a year, and service from the Overseas Terminal ceased in February 1952. Around that time, the Flight mural in the terminal was painted over for reasons unknown even to James Brooks, the mural's own artist. Brooks did not learn that the mural had been painted over until after the fact.

=== 1950s to 1970s ===
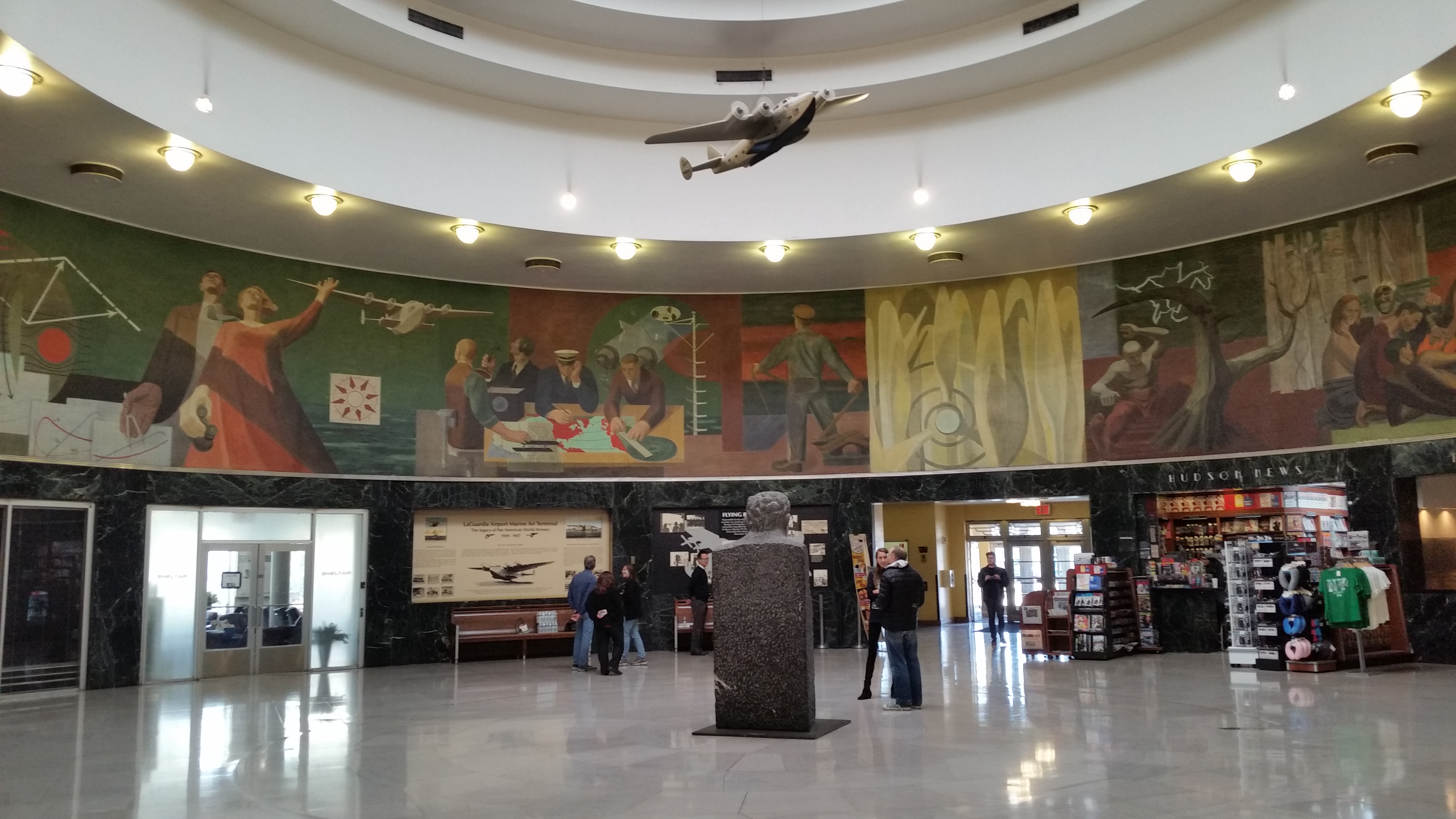
The mural inside the terminal's rotunda

According to The Wall Street Journal, the terminal was "quickly forgotten" after Clipper service stopped. The terminal was used mostly by private planes, non-scheduled flights, and military transports for high-ranking government officials. U.S. presidents Dwight D. Eisenhower and John F. Kennedy sometimes used the terminal when they landed at LaGuardia Airport. The terminal also contained the offices of flight simulation company FlightSafety, founded in 1951 by Albert Lee Ueltschi. The Port Authority announced its plans to renovate most of LaGuardia Airport in 1957, but the Marine Air Terminal was excluded from these plans.

The terminal reopened for commercial aviation on June 27, 1957, when Northeast Airlines leased the terminal for its shuttle services between New York and Boston. Private, non-scheduled, and military flights continued to use the terminal. That October, Northeast relocated Boston flights to LaGuardia's domestic terminal and started using the Marine Air Terminal for its flights to Florida. The swap took place because Gate 11 at the domestic terminal was too small for the four-engine DC-6Bs that were used on the Florida flights. Pan Am moved some of its remaining equipment from the Marine Air Terminal to Idlewild in 1958. By then, the Marine Air Terminal was no longer an important part of LaGuardia's operation; only five percent of the airport's 5.4 million passengers in 1959 came through the terminal. The New York Times described the terminal in 1960 as having "an air of decay and desolation", with a dirty skylight, broken equipment, peeling paint, and almost no passengers.

In 1964, American Hydrofoils agreed to operate a shuttle hydrofoil service from the Marine Air Terminal to East 25th Street and Pier 11/Wall Street in Manhattan. After the Federal Aviation Administration banned non-scheduled airlines from operating regular flights and selling tickets in the 1960s, the Marine Air Terminal sat nearly empty for several years. The Butler Aviation Company, which managed LaGuardia's general aviation operations, had divided the walkway adjoining the terminal into a waiting room and an office, and there was a pilots' lounge next to the walkway. Butler leased the terminal and spent $200,000 to renovate the eastern portion of the main building. Following the renovation, the Marine Air Terminal reopened in October 1966 as a general aviation terminal. At the time, there were 400 daily general aviation flights at LaGuardia, about half of the airport's daily air traffic. The terminal was then known as Butler Marine Air Terminal. The main building's rotunda was repainted in the 1960s and was again supposed to be repainted in the 1970s.

Aviation historian Geoffrey Arend advocated for the restoration of the Flight mural in the main building's rotunda starting in 1976. A reporter for The Christian Science Monitor wrote in 1979 that some of the main building's original Art Deco details remained, mainly on the exterior. That February, philanthropist Laurance Rockefeller and magazine publisher DeWitt Wallace agreed to partially fund the restoration of the Flight mural, which was projected to cost $75,000. Alan M. Farancz restored the mural, and it was rededicated on September 19, 1980. During that time, the New York City Landmarks Preservation Commission (LPC) considered protecting the terminal as an official New York City landmark Arend supported the designation, but the Port Authority expressed opposition because such a designation would severely restrict what the agency could do with the terminal. The LPC designated the main building's facade and a portion of its interior as landmarks in late 1980, citing it as "the only active terminal in the United States dating from the first generation of passenger air travel". The main building was also listed on the National Register of Historic Places on July 9, 1982.

=== Shuttle use ===
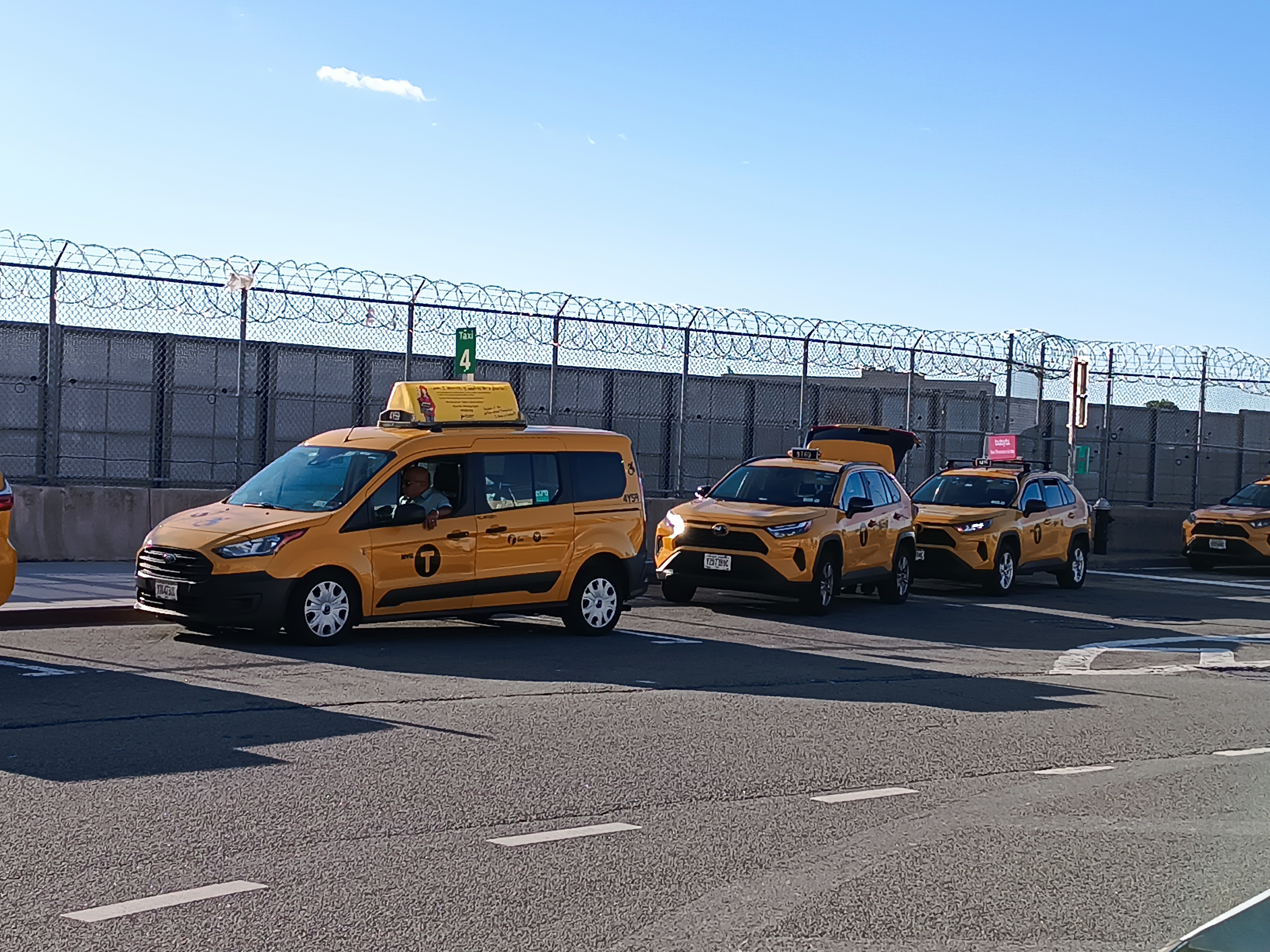
Taxis waiting in front of the Marine Air Terminal

==== Pan Am Shuttle ====
Pan Am announced its Pan Am Shuttle service from New York to Boston and Washington in 1986, having purchased the rights to New York Air's shuttle service. The airline initially planned to operate from two gates at the main terminal, but these gates were too small to fit the Boeing 727 and Airbus A300 fleet on the route, so Pan Am built new gates at the Marine Air Terminal. Construction of these gates began at the end of August 1986. Pan Am spent $23 million to build a prefabricated structure next to the main building. The structure was completed in 41 days, as Pan Am was contractually obligated to begin shuttle flights by October 1986. Local politicians and preservationists were irate at the changes. Days before the renovations were to be completed, several politicians attempted to halt the project, claiming that the Port Authority had illegally modified the portion of the terminal that had been designated as a landmark. Port Authority executives said they were only renovating a portion of the building that was not protected by the landmark designation. Rocco Manniello, who operated a small Italian restaurant at the rear of the main building, renovated his restaurant during this time.

Pan Am Shuttle flights started operating from the Marine Air Terminal on October 1, 1986. The terminal was relatively remote, being about 0.25 miles (0.40 km) from the other buildings at LaGuardia Airport. Taxicabs had to take a circuitous route to access the terminal, and taxi drivers were hesitant to pick up passengers at the terminal, prompting Pan Am to sponsor giveaways for taxi drivers who drove there. As a result, the shuttle was initially unable to compete with Eastern Air Lines, which carried the majority of passengers who flew between New York and Boston. To attract passengers, Pan Am started operating a ferry line between Wall Street and the terminal in August 1987 and added an intermediate stop at the East 34th Street Ferry Landing to the route in July 1988. This improved ridership to the point that Pan Am Shuttle was one of the airline's only profitable routes. Pan Am also opened a club for business flyers within the terminal. Nonetheless, by 1990, Pan Am sought to sell the shuttle.

==== Delta Shuttle ====
Delta Air Lines acquired the Pan Am Shuttle from Pan Am in 1991 and started operating the Delta Shuttle from the Marine Air Terminal using Boeing 727-200s. Delta also inherited the ferry route to Manhattan, which was unprofitable despite receiving large subsidies from Delta. By 1995, the Port Authority was considering restoring the facade and interior of the terminal's main building. Architectural firm Beyer Blinder Belle was hired to restore the terminal building to its original design, including light fixtures, canopies, and signage, at a cost of $600,000. A bust of Fiorello La Guardia was relocated from the airport's main terminal to the Marine Air Terminal in 1997. Harbor Shuttle, which operated ferry service from the Marine Air Terminal to Manhattan, was sold in 1998 to NY Waterway, which discontinued the service in 2000. The Port Authority unsuccessfully attempted to revive the ferry service in subsequent years.

Delta started renovating the terminal in early 1998 at a cost of $7.5 million. The Marine Air Terminal formally reopened in November 1999 with a new business center and concession stands. At the time, 80 percent of passengers at the terminal were business travelers, and about 6,000 of the airport's 65,000 daily passengers used the terminal. Following this renovation, most passengers were diverted past the main terminal building. The Port Authority spent about $6.5 million to restore the terminal in 2004, ahead of the 65th anniversary of the airport's first commercial flight. As part of the project, all of the tiles in the main building's frieze were removed for restoration. LaGuardia's general manager at the time called it the "crown jewel of the airport". Delta added a business center to the terminal in 2006. The Port Authority voted to install vehicular bollards in front of the terminal in 2007 due to security concerns following the September 11 attacks.

In 2009, it was announced as part of a slot-swap transaction that Delta Air Lines would relocate to LaGuardia's Central Terminal, while US Airways would start operating its US Airways Shuttle out of the Marine Air Terminal. The swap would have allowed Delta to operate hourly flights between LaGuardia and O'Hare International Airport. The proposed swap between US Airways and Delta never took place. Delta Shuttle continued to operate from the Marine Air Terminal until December 8, 2017. Meanwhile, in 2010, the New York City Taxi and Limousine Commission introduced a pilot program that allowed Delta Shuttle passengers to share a taxicab between the Marine Air Terminal and Manhattan, but this program was unpopular.

==== LaGuardia redevelopment ====
Diagram of LaGuardia Airport in 2022, showing Terminal A (Marine Air Terminal) at center left

In 2015, New York governor Andrew Cuomo and vice president Joe Biden announced a $4 billion plan to rebuild most of LaGuardia's terminals as one contiguous building. The Marine Air Terminal was preserved as part of the plan because it was an official landmark. On December 9, 2017, as part of the LaGuardia redevelopment, Delta Air Lines ceased shuttle operations out of the Marine Air Terminal, moving back to Terminal C. Alaska Airlines and JetBlue relocated their operations from Terminal B to the Marine Air Terminal. Alaska Airlines ended all service from LaGuardia Airport on October 27, 2018. JetBlue used the Marine Air Terminal for flights to Boston, Orlando, Fort Lauderdale, and West Palm Beach. The airline renovated the terminal as part of a project completed in early 2019.

On April 28, 2021, Spirit Airlines started service from the Marine Air Terminal for its flights to Fort Lauderdale, although the airline's other destinations were still located in Terminal C. Spirit moved its remaining LaGuardia services to the Marine Air Terminal the following March. JetBlue moved all operations to Terminal B on July 9, 2022, after having previously split its operations between Terminal B and the Marine Air Terminal. In mid-2023, JetBlue announced that, if its merger with Spirit was permitted to go through, it would sell Spirit's six gates and 22 landing slots at the Marine Air Terminal to Frontier Group Holdings during 2024. The JetBlue–Spirit merger did not go through. Frontier Airlines relocated to Terminal B in April 2024, leaving Spirit as the only airline at the Marine Air Terminal. In November 2025, as part of its 2026–2035 capital plan, the Port Authority announced plans to replace the passenger facilities at the Marine Air Terminal while preserving the main building's rotunda. In response to preservationists' concerns that the rotunda might be demolished or modified, the PANYNJ stated that the rotunda would remain unchanged and that only the later additions to the terminal would be removed. BermudAir also began flying out of Terminal A in November 2025 but suspended its LaGuardia operations five months later. Following the immediate shutdown of Spirit Airlines—Marine Air Terminal's sole tenant at the time—on May 2, 2026, the carrier vacated the terminal. Spirit's departure left the terminal without an active carrier.

== Main building ==
The Marine Air Terminal, also known as Terminal A, is at the western end of LaGuardia Airport in Queens, New York City, along the southern shore of Bowery Bay. The terminal was designed in the Art Deco style by William Delano of the firm Delano & Aldrich. It is LaGuardia Airport's only remaining structure from the 1940s; the other buildings from that era had also been designed in the Art Deco style.

Landside access to the main terminal building is via Marine Terminal Road, which ends at a turnaround directly in front of the building. This turnaround is served by the Q33 and M60 SBS buses, as well as the LaGuardia Airport shuttle bus. Originally, the terminal was accessed by 85th Street, a boulevard planted with hedges. Parking lot P10 is located next to the terminal.

=== Exterior ===
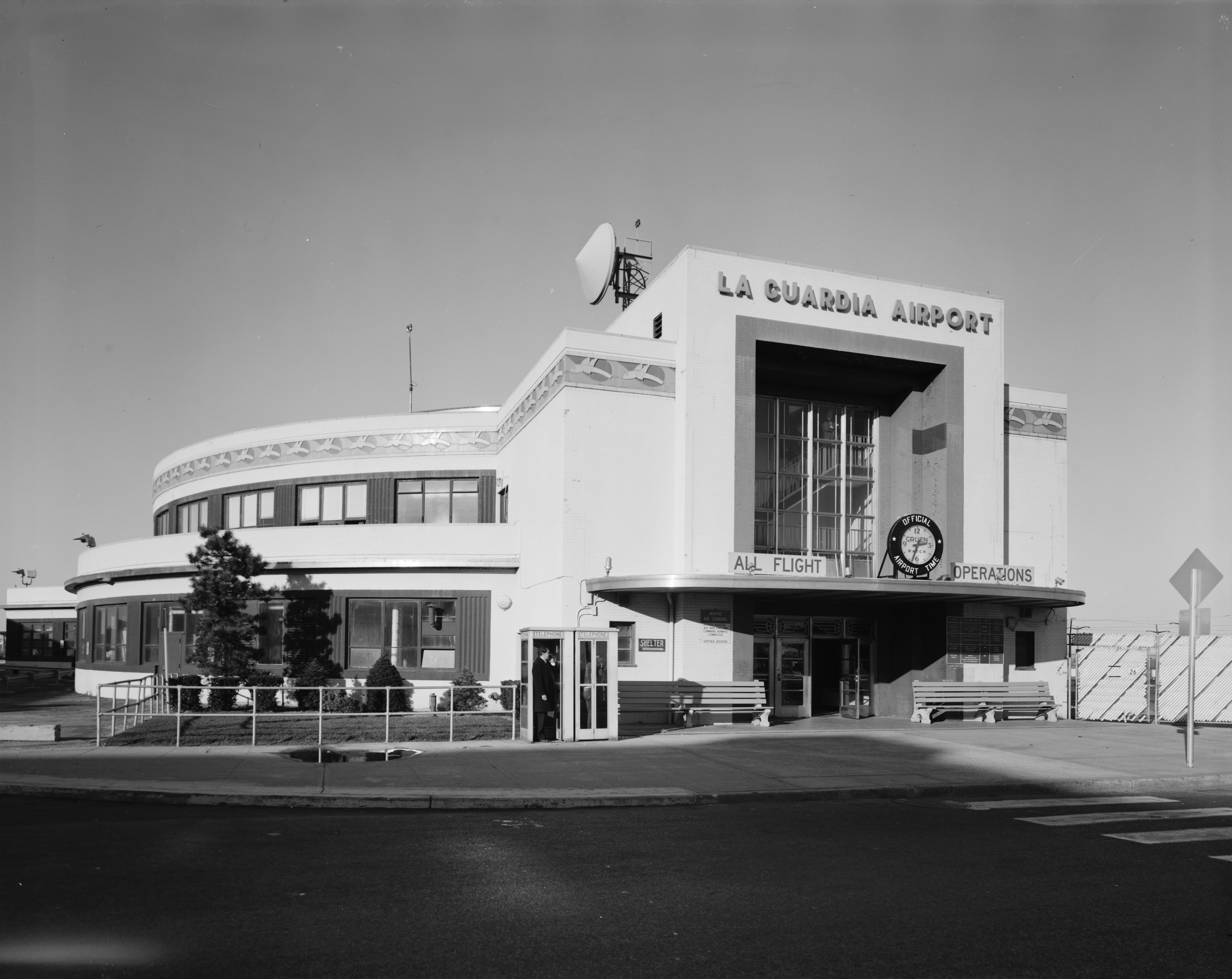
The entrance pavilion of the Marine Air Terminal in 1974

The terminal's main building is a circular two-story structure flanked by a pair of one-story wings facing northwest and northeast toward Bowery Bay. The main building is approached by a triple-height rectangular pavilion facing south. The entrance pavilion and the rear wings were all intended as access points into the central core, which housed the primary functions of the terminal. The brick facade was originally painted buff with black details but, by the 1980s, had been repainted beige with brown details. The buff and black color scheme has since been restored. A horizontal band runs across the facade between the first and second stories. The terminal's windows are largely oriented horizontally, rather than vertically as in other Art Deco structures; this may be attributed to the fact that the terminal was completed later than other Art Deco buildings and is also relatively short.

The circular core measures 144 feet (44 m) across. It contains a setback above the ground story, which makes it appear as though it is designed in a wedding-cake style. There are dark brick window frames on the ground and second stories, which surround groups of tripartite windows. Faceted brick panels are placed between each group of windows, and there were originally grilles over the windows themselves. A cornice of stainless steel, as well as a parapet and a rooftop balcony, run above the ground story. The rooftop balcony originally contained two observation decks. In addition, the second story is topped by a terracotta frieze, which depicts yellow flying fish against a background of light and dark blue waves. The frieze contains 2,200 individual tiles. A similar motif was also used on several of Delano and Aldrich's other structures. There is an attic with a facade of stainless steel panels, as well as a control tower at the rear of the attic.

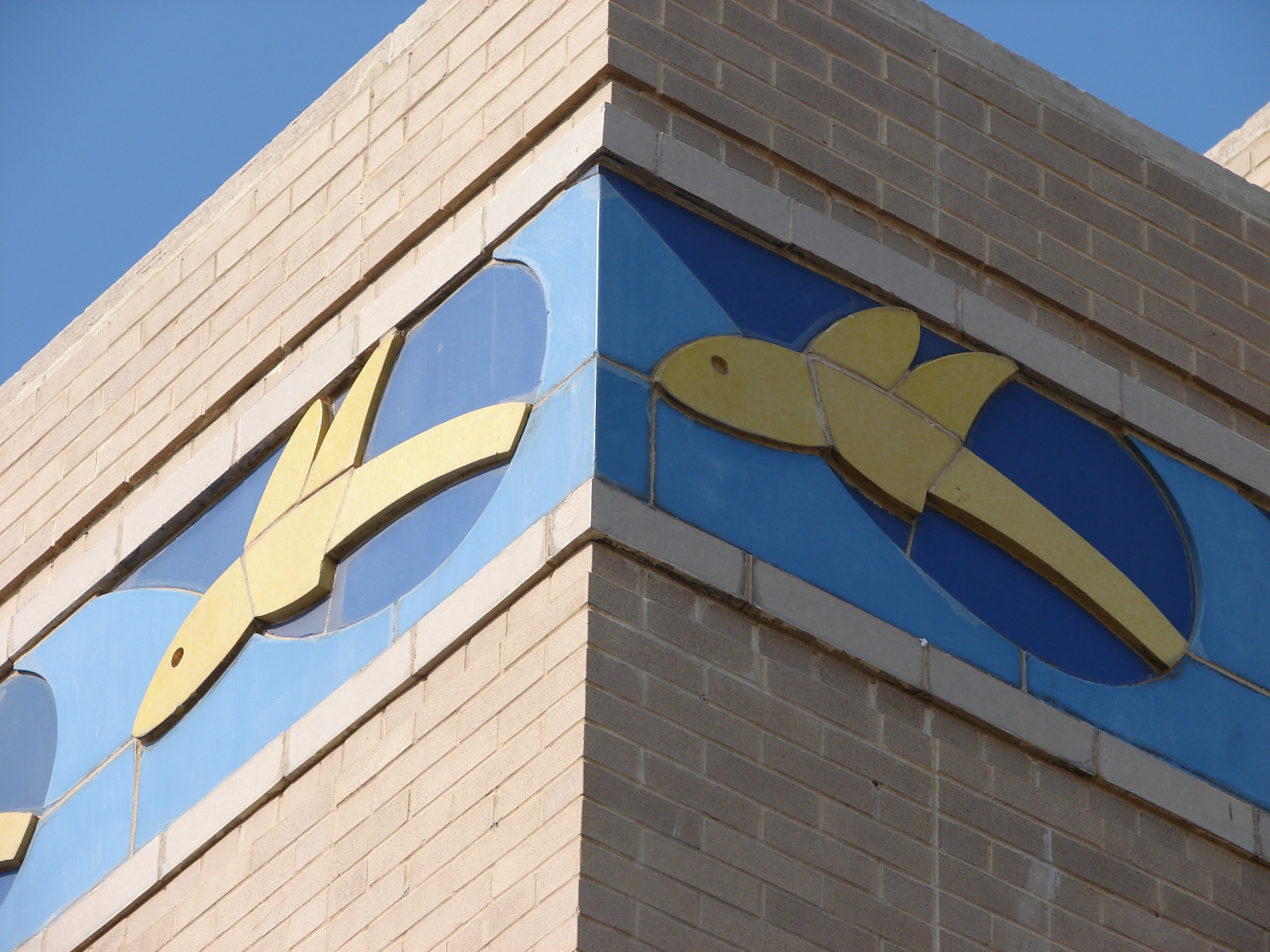
Detail of flying-fish frieze

The three-story rectangular entrance pavilion is flanked by two shorter sections. The entrance, at the center of this pavilion, consists of a doorway with four stainless steel doors, which are topped by transom panels depicting a pair of winged globes. A curving stainless-steel canopy extends in front of these doors, and a double-height window is placed above the canopy. The double-height window and the doorway are the same width and are both surrounded by a band of dark bricks. Steel mullions divide the window into a grid measuring four panes across and five panes high. The shorter sections of the pavilion contain small windows at ground level. The terracotta frieze around the circular core also runs atop the shorter sections of the entrance.

The rear wings measure 54 by 45 feet (16 by 14 m) across. They are similar in design to the circular core. Passengers boarded seaplanes from the northwest wing and arrived through the northeast wing. There was a copper canopy above the walkway leading to the northeast wing. A corridor, flanked by waiting rooms, extended from the northeast wing to a landing float in Bowery Bay. Originally, flying boats and other seaplanes typically taxied to the landing float, where they were pulled by a small motor boat to allow passengers to disembark into the terminal. Marine aircraft could approach the terminal via six operating channels in the bay, each measuring 9,000 by 1,000 feet (2,740 by 300 m). The modern Terminal A leads to gates A1 through A6.

=== Interior ===
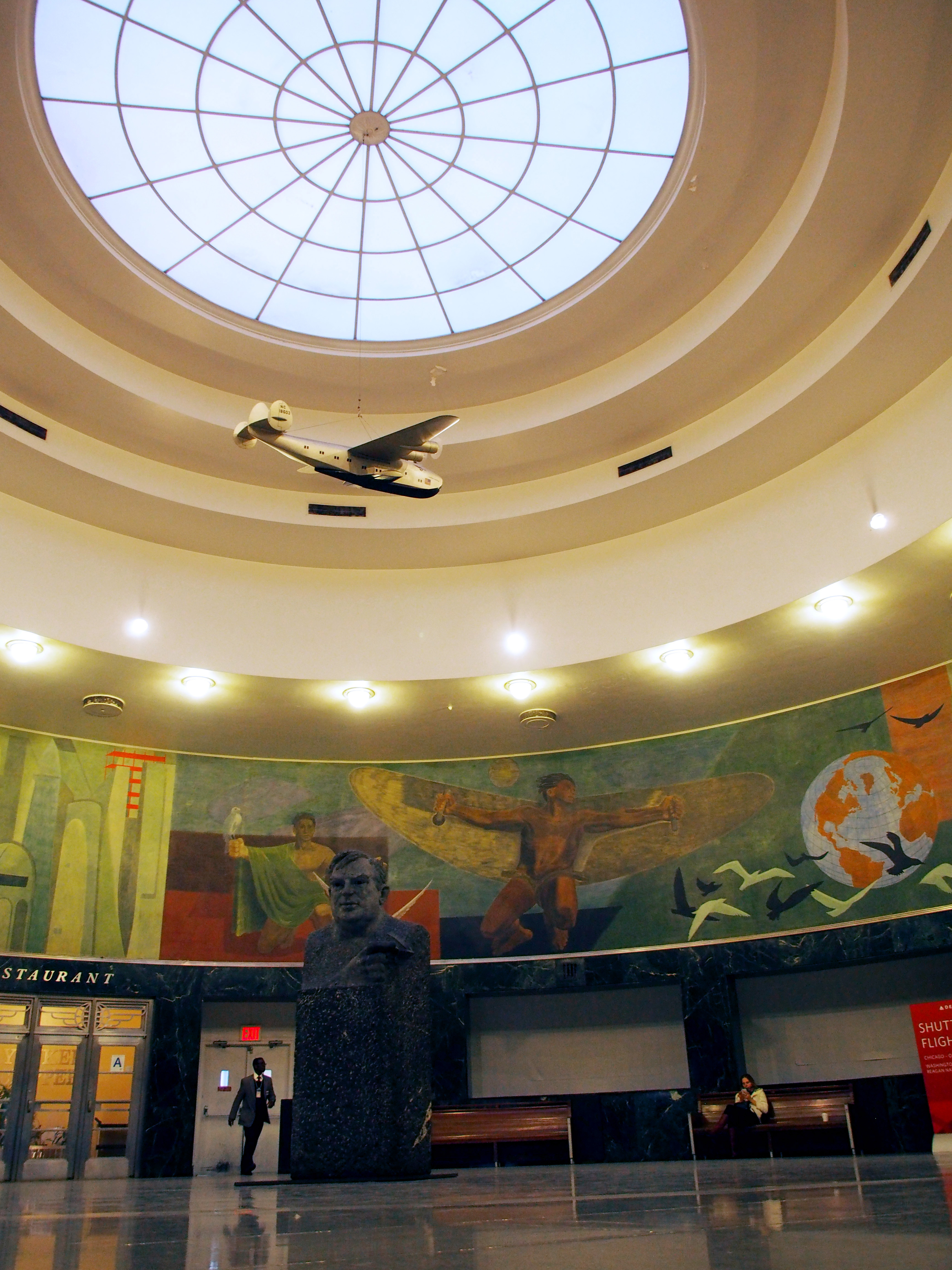
Part of the Flight mural with overhanging plane model

The four stainless-steel doors at the main entrance pavilion lead to a foyer with four doors of identical design, topped by transom panels depicting winged globes. Past the foyer are staircases with stainless-steel railings, as well as another set of five stainless-steel doors. These lead into a two-story rotunda with a skylight at the third story. The staircase around the rotunda could be seen from outside.

The rotunda contains light-gray marble floors with a circular geometric pattern at the center of the floor. The rotunda contains wooden benches, the ends of which contain stainless-steel arms that depict propeller blades. The lower section of the wall is made of dark-green marble. This wall is divided into 14 bays, which contain ticketing offices, stores, and other functions. These bays are arranged into groups of four or five, with each group being separated by the doors to the west, east, and south. A band of stainless steel runs above the wall at the ground story, separating it from the Flight mural on the upper section of the wall. The rotunda's ceiling steps upward from the perimeter of the room to the skylight at the center.

On the second story, surrounding the rotunda, were various offices for the terminal's staff, including radio technicians, communications workers, and meteorologists. In addition, there were turnstiles on the second and third stories for members of the public who wanted to observe the Clippers. The main building's control tower contained radio equipment for monitoring seaplane landings and takeoffs in Bowery Bay.

==== Mural ====
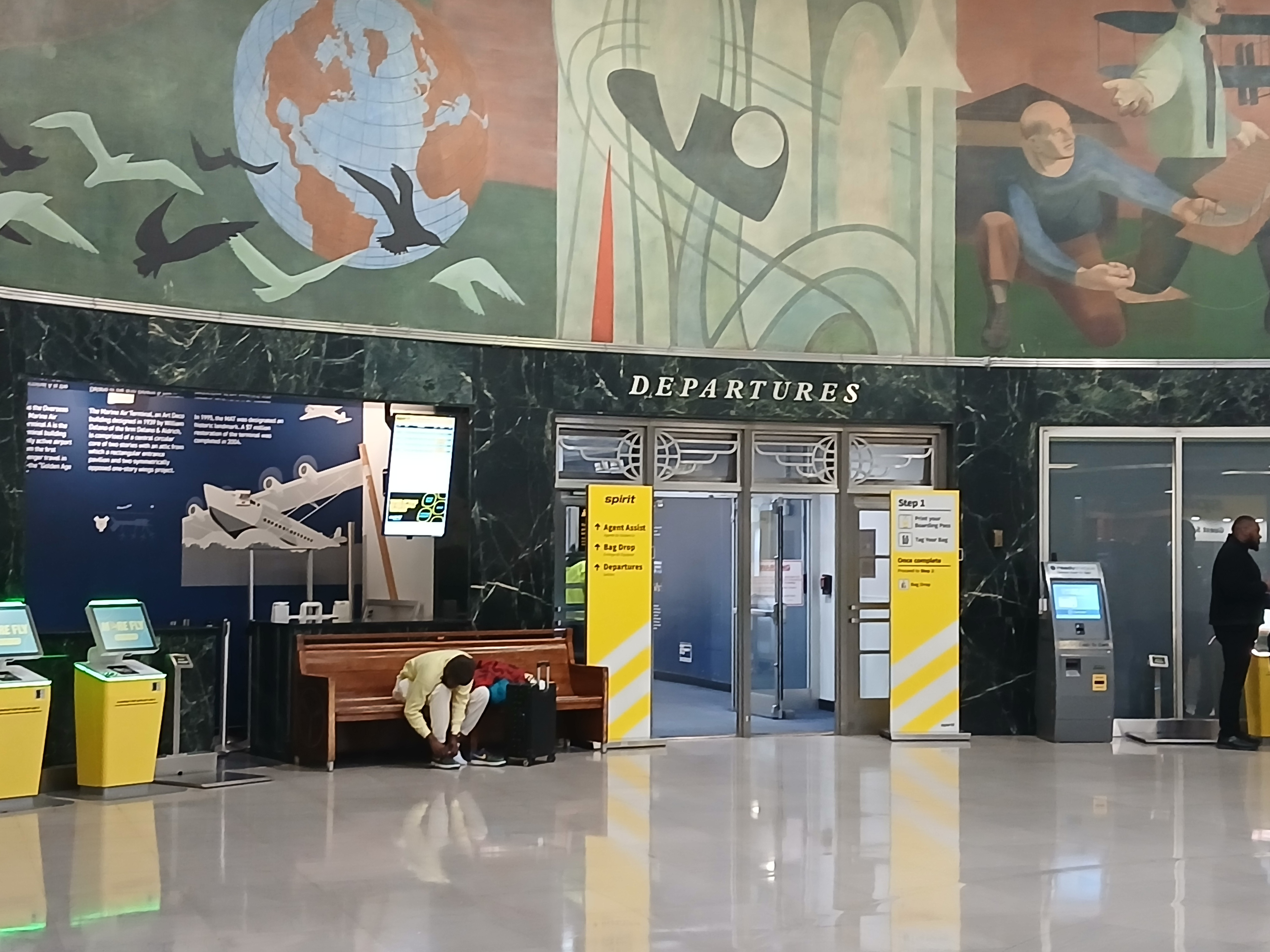
Doorway to northeastern arm, with Flight mural above

Inside the rotunda hangs Flight, a mural measuring 12 feet (3.7 m) tall and 237 feet (72 m) long. Completed by James Brooks in 1942, Flight depicts the history of man's involvement with flight. It was the largest mural created as part of the Great Depression-era Works Progress Administration (WPA). The mural is roughly divided into two sections. The first section depicts early history of aviation, including prehistoric humans' inability to fly; the Greek myth of Icarus, who flew too close to the sun and got burned; and the flight-related inventions of Leonardo da Vinci. The second section depicts the modern history of aviation, starting with the Wright brothers' test flights and ending with modern transatlantic flights. The mural hangs on the upper section of the wall, just below the ceiling.

Flight was completely painted over in 1952. It is unknown why this was done; The Wall Street Journal said it may have been due to anti-communist sentiment, but LaGuardia operations chief Anthony Cycovek said the rotunda had begun to look dingy when the mural was painted over. The mural was only rediscovered in 1973, after Cycovek mentioned it to a Port of New York Authority executive who had heard of the National Fine Arts Inventory Project, a program dedicated to finding lost works of government-commissioned art. In the late 1970s, Geoffrey Arend, an aviation historian and author of Great Airports: LaGuardia, mounted a campaign to restore the mural to its original splendor. The mural was rededicated on September 18, 1980. Grace Glueck of The New York Times described it as "the most egregious case of mural censorship" of a WPA mural in New York City. By 2022, Flight had been restored again as part of the LaGuardia redevelopment.

== Seaplane hangar ==
When LaGuardia Airport was built in the 1930s, two seaplane hangars adjacent to the main building were planned. Initially, only one hangar was built. The hangar had five sides and resembled a half-octagon from above. The north and south sides of the hangar each measured 169 feet 7 inches (51.69 m) wide; the northwest and southwest sides were each 204 feet 4 inches (62.28 m) wide; and the west side was 354 feet (108 m) wide. The hangar had four openings through which seaplanes and flying boats could enter. These openings measured 45 feet (14 m) high. In addition, the roof of the hangar measured 75 feet (23 m) high and was held up by trusses extending from a central pillar. A tunnel connected the hangar to the main building.

Next to the hangar were ramps with floodlights, as well as taxiways illuminated by lamps. There were also 18 large gasoline tanks next to the hangar, each with a capacity of 20,000 U.S. gallons (76,000 L). Whenever the Clippers needed maintenance, they could be pulled out of the water, moved onto a set of tracks, and towed to the hangar. The tracks were made of concrete and could accommodate aircraft weighing up to 250 short tons (220 long tons; 230 t), or about five times as heavy as an empty Boeing 314.

After the Clippers stopped serving the Marine Air Terminal, the hangar was used to store maintenance vehicles, as well as for LaGuardia Airport's executive offices. As of 2021, the hangar still exists and is known as Hangar 7. The Port Authority of New York and New Jersey uses the structure as a garage for the airport's snow-removal vehicles. The roof of the hangar contains Spirit of Flight, a sculpture of a bird whose wingspan measures 17 feet (5.2 m) wide. The sculpture was formerly placed atop the roof of LaGuardia's Domestic Terminal, which was razed in 1963.

== See also ==
- List of New York City Designated Landmarks in Queens
- National Register of Historic Places listings in Queens County, New York
- Art Deco architecture of New York City
