= Trump Shuttle =

Airline of the United States (1989–1992)

Trump Shuttle, Inc.

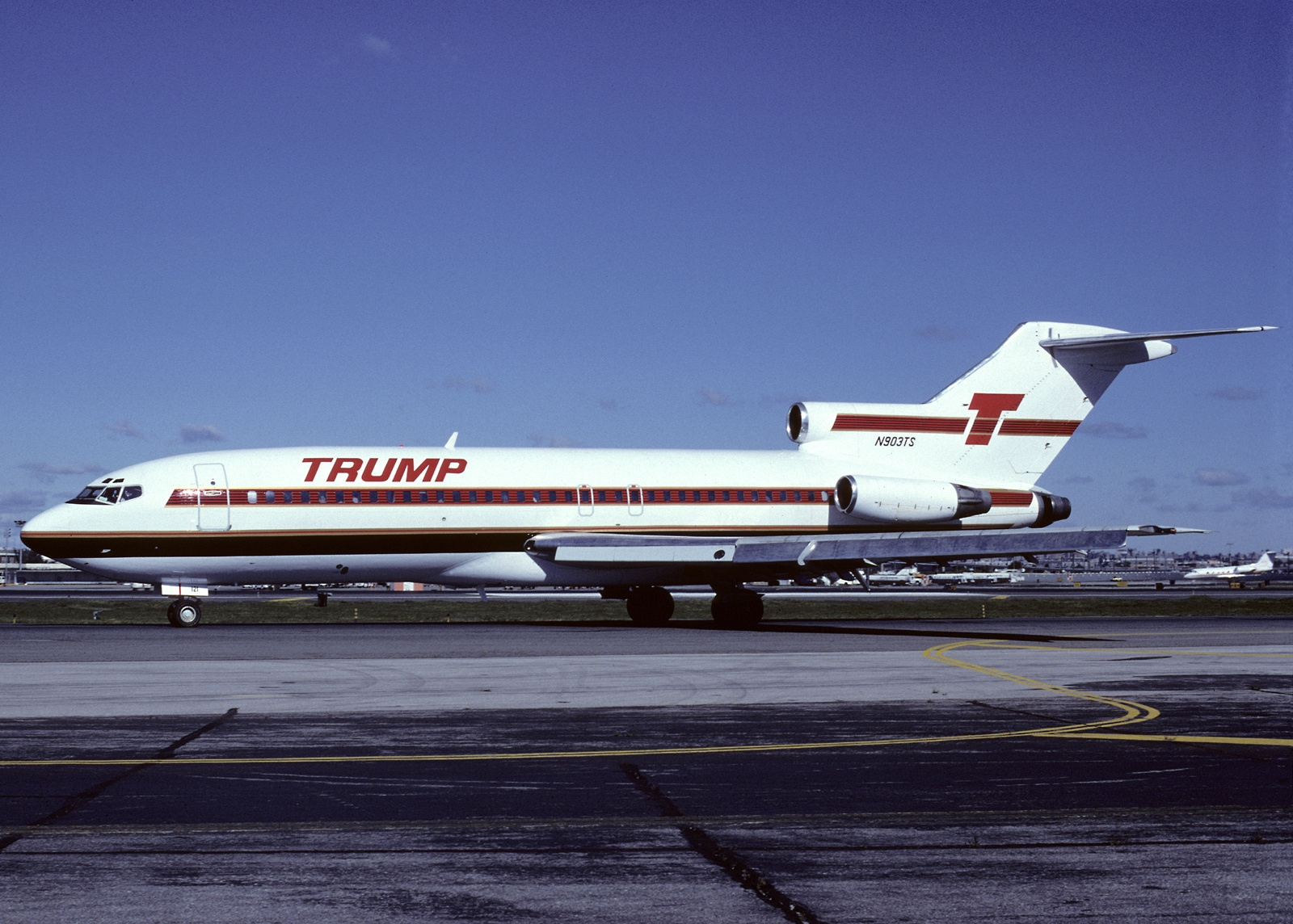
- A Trump Shuttle Boeing 727-100 in 1989
IATA	ICAO	Call sign
TB	TPS	TRUMP
- Commenced operations: June 8, 1989
- Ceased operations: April 12, 1992 (rebranded as USAir Shuttle)
- Hubs: New York–LaGuardia
- Focus cities: Boston; Washington–National
- Parent company: The Trump Organization (1989–1992)
- Key people: Donald Trump (owner); Bette Nash (flight attendant)

Trump Shuttle was a short-lived airline owned by Donald Trump from 1989 to 1992. The landing rights and some of the physical assets necessary to operate the shuttle flights were originally part of Eastern Air Lines and known as the Eastern Air Lines Shuttle. It operated hourly flights on Boeing 727 aircraft from LaGuardia Airport in New York City to Boston Logan International Airport in Boston, Massachusetts, and Ronald Reagan Washington National Airport in Washington, D.C., as well as air charter service to other destinations. Its IATA designator code was TB (later reassigned to Jetairfly, which became TUI fly Belgium).

Trump's formal launch in the air business occurred in March 1988 when he acquired three Sikorsky S-61 helicopters that belonged to Resorts International Airlines (RIA) used to shuttle high rollers to the Resorts Casino Hotel in Atlantic City, New Jersey. The three green and orange helicopters were repainted black and red and emblazoned with the Trump Air logo.

== History ==
=== Formation ===
In the late 1980s, both Eastern Air Lines and Pan Am operated air shuttle services in the Northeastern United States which were highly profitable even though the two airlines, as a whole, were not. As the financial outlook for Eastern became more pessimistic in the late 1980s, the carrier began to sell its routes and aircraft. It organized its profitable shuttle operation into a separate company, headed by Bruce Nobles, with the intent of selling it to raise cash.

Eastern chairman Frank Lorenzo met Donald Trump at a party and subsequently negotiated the sale of the shuttle to Trump for $365 million, more than the projected cost to start up a similar airline, but justifiable if the airline achieved a high market share. For that price, Trump got a fleet of 17 Boeing 727s, landing facilities in each of the three cities that the shuttle flew to, and the right to put his name on the company and its airplanes. The shuttle had previously been a no frills operation for business travelers, but Trump announced that he would convert it into a luxury airline.

After reaching an agreement with Trump in October 1988, Eastern filed for Chapter 11 bankruptcy protection. Many passengers switched to the competing Pan Am Shuttle, and the previously profitable Eastern Shuttle began losing money. Trump attempted to use the situation to negotiate a lower price and to acquire additional aircraft from Eastern. America West Airlines submitted a more attractive competing offer on May 10, but failed as its financing was not in place. Trump's offer was approved by the bankruptcy court in May 1989. In June 1989 the deal was completed, financed through a loan from a syndicate of banks led by Citibank.

The new Trump Shuttle operation launched on June 8, 1989, and by the end of August had returned to a strong market share of 40–50%. Trump pushed to make the new shuttle a luxury service and a marketing vehicle for the Trump name. Its aircraft were newly painted in white livery and the interiors redecorated with such features as maple wood veneer, chrome seat belt latches, and gold colored lavatory fixtures. The airline also was a leader in the adoption of advanced technologies: It introduced some of the first passenger self-service check-in kiosks, in coordination with Kinetics, at its LaGuardia base; and partnered with LapStop, a startup firm that rented laptop computers to passengers. The airline was also an early adopter of the GTE Airfone in-flight telephone system. Flights offered free meals, including chicken and steak on some flights, as well as complimentary champagne, beer, and wine. Both Trump and Pan Am spent millions on advertising campaigns around this time in an attempt to maintain strong competitive positions.

=== August 1989 incident ===
In August 1989, a Trump Shuttle flight arriving in Boston incurred a nose gear failure upon landing due to maintenance errors by Eastern personnel prior to the acquisition. Trump personally flew on the next Trump Shuttle flight to Boston in order to manage the public reaction to the incident.

=== Financial difficulties ===
Trump Shuttle Financial Results
(USD 000)	1990	1991
Operating revenue	172,013	169,096
Operating loss	(40,122)	(24,671)
Net loss	(68,761)	(58,552)
Operating margin	-23.3%	-14.6%
Net margin	-40.0%	-34.6%

The company was never profitable. Passenger traffic on the shuttle began to decline in November 1989. In late 1989, the Northeastern United States entered an economic recession which depressed demand, while the August 1990 Iraqi invasion of Kuwait caused jet fuel prices to double. While costs of running the airline rose, many of the corporate customers using the shuttle were cutting travel budgets. Trump's casino business was simultaneously encountering serious difficulties, and Trump was forced to cede control over several business holdings to his bankers in June 1990 in order to avoid personal bankruptcy. The airline ran out of cash and defaulted on its debt in September 1990.

Trump Shuttle conducted some charter operations around this time to monetize the shuttle's spare aircraft. In June 1990, the airline carried Nelson Mandela on his eight-city tour of the United States. During the Gulf War of 1990–91, the airline received a government contract to ferry U.S. military personnel between the key domestic bases of Dover AFB, Charleston AFB, Travis AFB, McChord AFB, and Kelly AFB.

=== Sale ===
Trump had personally guaranteed $135 million of the shuttle's debt. Following the default, Citibank made arrangements for Northwest Airlines to take control of the shuttle in exchange for relieving Trump's personal liability on its debt, and all sides were reportedly close to an agreement by April 1991. Delta Air Lines agreed to buy the competing Pan Am Shuttle in July, and Northwest announced that its acquisition of the Trump Shuttle was cancelled in August, reportedly due to the Trump Shuttle's unions demanding parity with Northwest employees and Trump refusing to discount the price to reflect this. USAir ultimately reached an agreement in December 1991 to take operational control of Trump Shuttle for up to ten years, with an option to buy it after five years. Bankers involved in the negotiations said that Trump would be relieved of at least $100 million of his guarantee, and possibly as much as $110 million, leaving him owing between $25 and $35 million in the closing out of his ownership of the company.

On April 7, 1992, Trump Shuttle ceased to exist when it was merged into a new corporation, Shuttle, Inc., which began operating as the USAir Shuttle on April 12, 1992. US Airways subsequently purchased the remainder of Shuttle, Inc., on November 19, 1997, and the service subsequently operated under the name US Airways Shuttle. Shuttle, Inc., remained as a subsidiary of USAir until July 1, 2000, when it was merged into US Airways. In October 2015, US Airways merged with American Airlines, at which point the shuttle became the American Airlines Shuttle.

== Helicopter service ==
Trump Air operated a scheduled helicopter service between LaGuardia Airport and Wall Street Heliport to provide connections with Trump Shuttle flights at LaGuardia.

Trump Air also operated between New York City and East Hampton Airport from 1989 to 1992, and between West 30th Street Heliport and Steeplechase Pier in Atlantic City to serve Trump's casinos. It used Sikorsky S-61 and Boeing Chinook helicopters. It was established on March 22, 1988, with three Sikorsky S-61 helicopters, which could carry 24 passengers each, with service between the West 30th Street Heliport in Manhattan and Bader Field and the Steeplechase Pier in Atlantic City. Fares were from $49–125, and travel time was 48 minutes. One of the helicopters had already been operating for about a month. Trump had acquired the helicopters, which had been Resorts International Air, as part of his 1988 deal with Merv Griffin following Griffin's takeover of Resorts International Inc.

== Fleet ==
The Trump Shuttle fleet consisted of the following aircraft:

- 8 Boeing 727-100
- 17 Boeing 727-200

== See also ==
- List of defunct airlines of the United States
- List of things named after Donald Trump
