= Delta Shuttle =

Air shuttle service in the northeastern United States

IATA	ICAO	Call sign
DL	DAL	DELTA
- Founded: October 1, 1986; 39 years ago (as Pan Am Shuttle)
- Commenced operations: September 1, 1991; 34 years ago (as Delta Shuttle)
- Frequent-flyer program: SkyMiles
- Alliance: SkyTeam (affiliate)
- Fleet size: 34
- Destinations: Boston; Chicago–O'Hare; New York–LaGuardia; Washington–National
- Parent company: Delta Air Lines
- Headquarters: Atlanta, Georgia, U.S.
- Website: www.delta.com/content/www/en_US/traveling-with-us/where-we-fly/flight-partners/delta-shuttle.html

Delta Shuttle is the brand name for Delta Air Lines' air shuttle service in the Northeastern United States.

== History ==
=== New York Air ===
In 1980, airline industry entrepreneur Frank Lorenzo, through his holding company Texas Air Corporation, formed startup, non-union airline New York Air. Operations commenced on December 19, 1980, with hourly shuttle service between New York LaGuardia, Washington National, and Boston Logan airports in direct competition with the long-established, successful Eastern Air Lines Shuttle. Launched with McDonnell Douglas DC-9 series 30 aircraft, New York Air later added larger DC-9 Super 80s to its fleet.

=== Pan Am Shuttle ===
In February 1986, Texas Air Corporation acquired debt-laden Eastern Air Lines and its shuttle operations. As a condition of the sale, the government required Texas Air to divest New York Air's takeoff and landing rights at LaGuardia and Washington National. These were purchased by Pan American World Airways, along with gates at LaGuardia's historic Marine Air Terminal, for $76 million. The rechristened Pan Am Shuttle launched on October 1, 1986, with dedicated crews, a fleet of Boeing 727 aircraft, and a newly renovated Marine Air Terminal. Though Pan Am suffered a precipitous financial decline in the ensuing years, culminating in the airline's January 1991 bankruptcy filing, the shuttle operation remained profitable.

=== Delta Shuttle ===
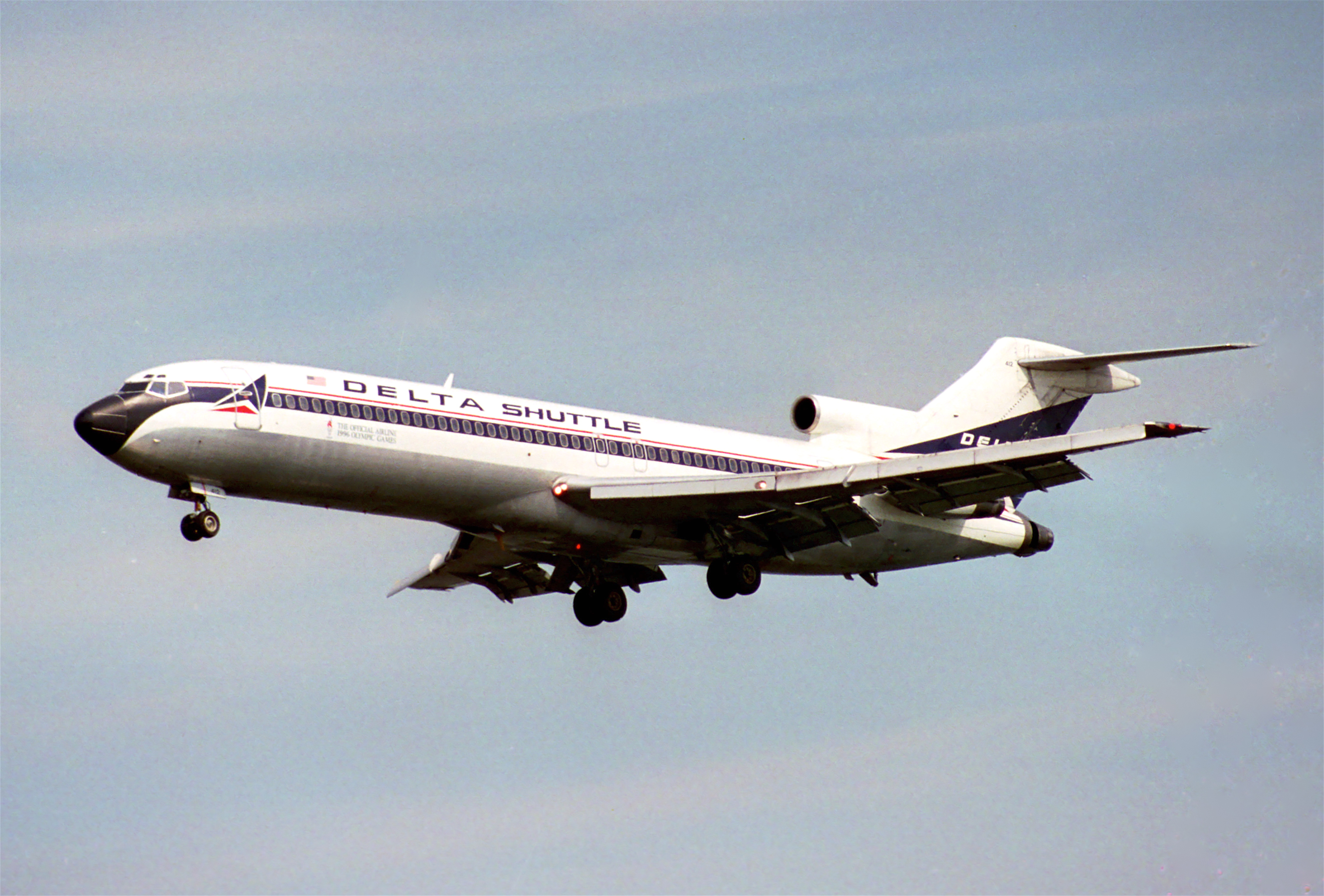
A Delta Shuttle Boeing 727-200 at Washington National Airport

Delta Air Lines purchased Pan Am Shuttle (including several Boeing 727s) for $113 million, thereby securing Delta's position as the third largest U.S. airline. Delta relaunched the service under the Delta Shuttle brand on September 1, 1991.

==== 2000–2010 ====
Delta Shuttle began introducing new Boeing 737-800 aircraft in August 2000 to replace its fleet of Boeing 727s. Delivered over the course of six months, the sixteen new aircraft were 90 percent quieter and 35 to 40 percent more fuel efficient than the Boeing 727s and afforded passengers laptop power ports and an industry-leading 36 inches of seat pitch and six inches of recline in an all-economy cabin. The final Delta Shuttle 727 was retired on January 8, 2001.

Amidst the fleet renewal, Delta Shuttle expanded its nonstop Boston-Washington service to nine daily round-trip flights, departing every other hour, on November 1, 2000. The new service was short lived, however, as weak demand prompted Delta to discontinue the Shuttle product on the route on September 1, 2001, in favor of four daily round-trip flights operated by Delta Connection carrier Atlantic Coast Airlines.

For a short period beginning in late 2003, Delta shifted service of its Shuttle routes to Boeing 737-300s. This move was temporary, and by November 2005, Delta had retired the aging Boeing 737-300s in favor of a dedicated Shuttle fleet of nine larger, younger McDonnell Douglas MD-88 aircraft.

Delta Shuttle was the last of the shuttle operations to guarantee a seat to walk-up passengers. If a plane was oversold, a second plane would be rolled out within fifteen minutes to form an "extra section" to fly the overflow passengers. This practice ended in 2005.

On September 14, 2005, parent company Delta Air Lines filed for bankruptcy, citing rising fuel costs. It emerged from bankruptcy in April 2007 after fending off a hostile takeover from US Airways and its shares were re-listed on the New York Stock Exchange.

In September 2008, Delta announced it would dissolve the dedicated MD-88 Shuttle fleet into the much larger mainline MD-88 fleet. While the dedicated Shuttle fleet had featured a single cabin of economy class seating with increased pitch, the reconfigured planes offered both first class and economy cabins, with the mainline-standard seat pitch in each. By December 1, 2008, all Delta Shuttle flights offered first class seating, better aligning Delta's product with that of rival US Airways Shuttle. Later that month, citing reduced demand, Delta announced that the MD-88s serving its New York-Washington route would be replaced with smaller, more efficient, two-class Embraer 175 jets operated by Delta Connection partners beginning in March 2009.

On August 12, 2009, Delta Air Lines and US Airways announced their intention to swap facilities and takeoff and landing slots at capacity-controlled LaGuardia and Ronald Reagan Washington National Airports, pending government approval. Under the initial plan, Delta would have acquired 125 slot pairs and Terminal C at LaGuardia from US Airways. In return, Delta would have relinquished the Marine Air Terminal at LaGuardia and 42 slot pairs at Washington/Reagan to US Airways. Delta Shuttle was to relocate to newly connected Terminals C and D, alongside Delta's greatly expanded mainline operation. Citing concerns about reduced competition, the United States Department of Transportation challenged several elements of the plan, and the frustrated airlines appealed the agency's ruling over the ensuing 21 months. Meanwhile, the United Airlines-Continental Airlines and Southwest Airlines-AirTran Airlines mergers sharpened competition in the New York and Washington regions. Delta and US Airways finally dismissed their appeal and submitted a revised slot swap agreement to the DOT in May 2011, by which time Delta had dropped its plan to relocate the Delta Shuttle out of the Marine Air Terminal. Acknowledging new market realities and the airlines' willingness to divest a small number of slot pairs to other carriers, the DOT approved the slot swap on October 10, 2011, and the deal closed two months later on December 13.

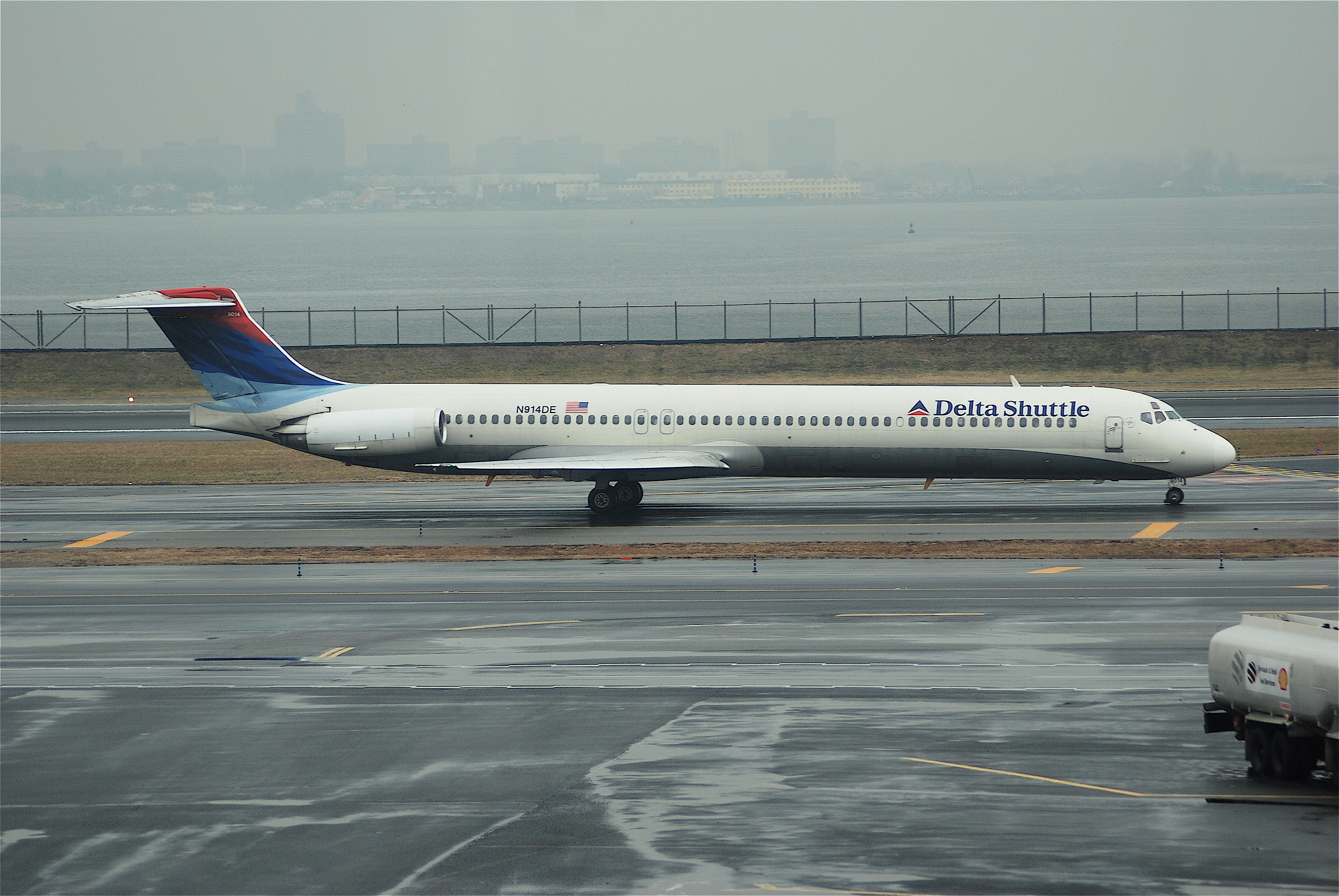
A Delta Shuttle MD-88 at LaGuardia Airport, 2008

In the interim, Delta had expanded its Delta Shuttle network to serve Chicago's O'Hare Airport from New York/LaGuardia. Delta introduced eleven daily round-trip flights (later increased to fourteen) between the two airports on June 10, 2010. The service was operated with two-class Embraer 175 jets by Shuttle America. Given the Shuttle expansion at O'Hare, Delta discontinued its mainline service between New York/LaGuardia and Chicago/Midway on June 9, 2010. Also in June, Delta ended MD-88 service between New York/LaGuardia and Boston, opting to use a combination of smaller, more efficient Airbus A319 jets (Sunday and weekday flights) and Embraer regional jets (Saturday flights).

==== Delta connection carriers Shuttle America and Compass Airlines ====
On March 25, 2012, the longstanding Delta Shuttle schedule was adjusted as the parent carrier finally assumed control of the slot pairs acquired from US Airways at LaGuardia. Delta Shuttle flights between New York, Boston, and Washington, DC, which had previously departed on the half-hour, were rescheduled to depart on the hour in direct competition with US Airways Shuttle. Having relinquished slot pairs to US Airways at Washington/Reagan, Delta also cut all nonstop flights between Boston and Washington, though by that point they hadn't operated under the Delta Shuttle brand in over ten years.

With passenger loads declining, Delta discontinued the use of mainline Airbus A319s on the Boston route on June 10, 2012, in favor of Embraer 170 and 175s operated by Shuttle America. Boston had been the last remaining Delta Shuttle route that was still operated with mainline aircraft; thereafter, all Delta Shuttle flights were operated by Delta Connection carriers Shuttle America and Compass Airlines. Following its move to LaGuardia's Terminal C on November 2, 2014, the Boston shuttle now saw mainline service once again, with Delta's Boeing 717 operating alongside the Shuttle America Embraer 175.

==== Delta Shuttle West Coast service ====
For a time, Delta expanded the Delta Shuttle network to the West Coast. The service was launched on September 3, 2013, with Delta adding additional service to create fourteen daily round-trip flights on the route between Los Angeles and San Francisco and adding additional features similar to the shuttle system on the East Coast. The West Coast shuttle was further expanded in mid-2016 with Delta adding its recently established Seattle/Tacoma hub to the network, with service to both Los Angeles and San Francisco. Additional flights between Los Angeles and San Francisco were also added at the same time. The West Coast shuttle flights were served by a mix with two-class Embraer 175 regional jets operated by a Delta Connection partner, and Delta mainline Boeing 717 and Boeing 737-800 aircraft.

=== Current operation ===
Delta discontinued its Delta Shuttle services on the west coast on January 4, 2018. The flights were rebranded as regular domestic service. At the time of the change, Delta kept the frequent schedules between the West Coast cities, but eliminated the additional services and amenities.

As of December 21, 2021, all Delta Shuttle flights at LaGuardia Airport depart from Terminal C.

== Destinations ==
Operated by Delta Air Lines and Republic Airways

New York/LaGuardia to and from:

- Boston
- Chicago–O'Hare
- Washington–Reagan

== Fleet ==
Aircraft	Passengers				Notes
Aircraft	F	C+	Y	Total	Notes
Airbus A220-100	12	15	82	109	Operated by Delta Air Lines
Embraer 170	9	12	48	69	Operated by Republic Airways
Embraer 175	12	12	52	76	Operated by Republic Airways

== Services and amenities ==
Delta Shuttle is marketed primarily toward business travelers commuting between the Northeast's business centers in New York, Boston, Washington, DC, and Chicago. As a premium product, Delta Shuttle affords all passengers the following services and amenities not typically offered on mainline Delta flights:

- Complimentary onboard premium snack service
- Complimentary onboard wine, craft beer, and spirits
- Reduced minimum check-in and boarding times
- Access to expedited TSA security lines
- Dedicated gates near security for quick curb-to-gate transit
- Complimentary newspapers and magazines, coffee, and juice in gate waiting areas

== Competition ==
Delta Shuttle's East Coast operation was a direct competitor to American Airlines Shuttle which was discontinued in 2021. While additional carriers compete on the same routes as Delta Shuttle, none match the enhanced shuttle-specific services and amenities that Delta provides.

In the Northeast Corridor, former air shuttle passengers have increasingly abandoned air travel for Amtrak's high speed Acela Express train service, especially in the wake of post-9/11 security screenings and airline service reductions. In response, both Delta and American have resorted to flying smaller regional aircraft on their shuttle routes, though hourly frequencies remain.
