= Eastern Air Lines Shuttle =

Air shuttle service of the United States (1961–1989)

IATA	ICAO	Call sign
EA	—	—
- Founded: April 30, 1961
- Ceased operations: June 7, 1989 (rebranded as Trump Shuttle)
- Destinations: Boston; Newark; New York–LaGuardia; Washington–National
- Parent company: Eastern Air Lines (1961–1989)
- Key people: Bette Nash (flight attendant)

Eastern Air Lines Shuttle (or Eastern Air Shuttle) was the brand name of Eastern's air shuttle that began on April 30, 1961. The shuttle originally flew between New York City, Boston, Washington, and Newark. The shuttle became part of the fabric of business and government travel in the northeast corridor. No reservations were needed; passengers just showed up at the terminal, and if a plane was full, another was rolled out.

The shuttle's slogan was Imagine life without us. It was sold in 1988 and in its more recent incarnation was known as the American Airlines Shuttle.

== Service ==
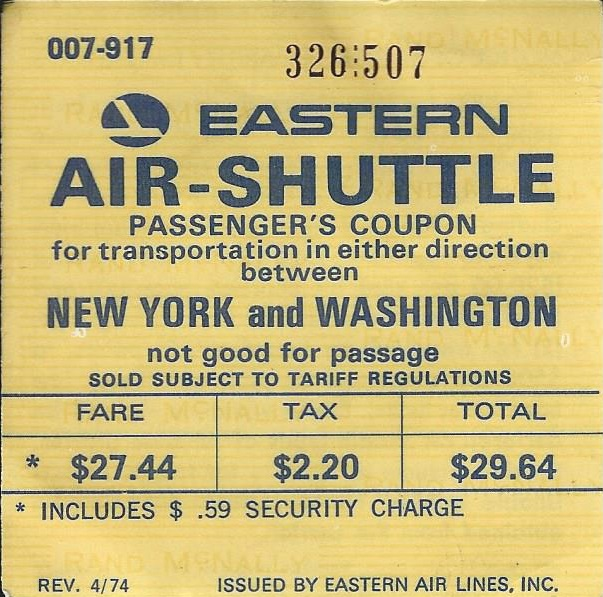
Eastern Air Shuttle ticket in the mid-1970s

On April 30, 1961, Eastern inaugurated the Eastern Air Lines Shuttle. Initially 95/96 seat Lockheed 1049 Super Constellations left New York-LaGuardia every two hours, from 8:00 AM to 10:00 PM, to Washington National and to Boston. On August 1 LGA-BOS became hourly, 7:00 AM to 10:00 PM out of each city; LGA-DCA followed in the next month or two. Fare in May 1961 was $10.95 to Boston and $12.75 to Washington; rail coach to Washington was $9.68. Passengers could pay in cash after boarding, so the fares soon dropped a few cents to $12 and $14 including the 10% federal tax.

Reservations were not needed, seat assignments were not given, and initially no check-in was required and no boarding passes were issued. But Eastern guaranteed everyone a seat; if the flight filled up, another aircraft was ready to go. On Sunday after Thanksgiving 1961 the 10 PM flights between La Guardia and Boston carried 623 passengers on seven aircraft. The Sunday following Thanksgiving was always the Shuttle's busiest day; on 1 December 1968 the Shuttle carried 21,760 passengers on 94 first-section flights and 197 extra sections.

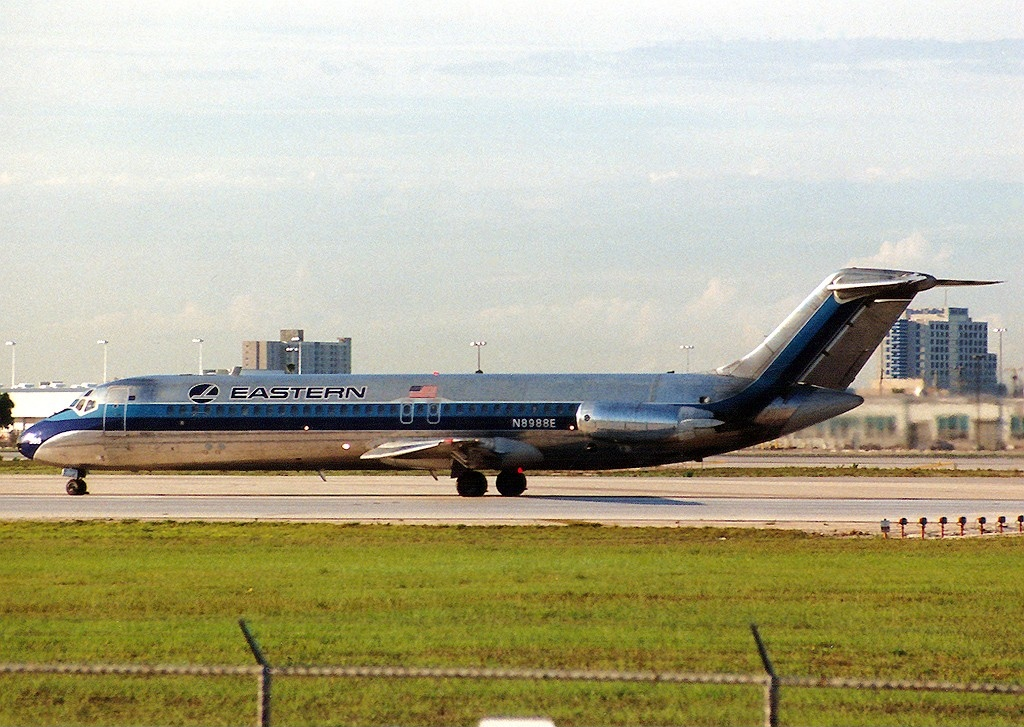
First sections were DC-9s from 1967 until the Shuttle's demise

The Shuttle peaked in 1963, when weekdays saw hourly Super Constellations 7:00 AM to 10:00 PM each way LGA-BOS and LGA-DCA, hourly DC-7Bs 7:30 to 10:30 each way EWR-BOS, Super Constellations every two hours 7:30 to 9:30 each way EWR-DCA and five flights each way DCA-BOS. In 1966 the NY Times reported that the Shuttle was carrying 86% of the "Washington-New York area air traffic" and 76% of the traffic to Boston; it said the Shuttle "lost several million dollars a year until about two years ago".

Electras took over the first sections LGA-BOS and LGA-DCA in Sept-Oct 1965 (the last Constellation shuttle flights were in 1968); Electras became backups to 727s in 1966, then to DC-9s in 1967.

== Later years and competition ==
New York Air, a subsidiary of Frank Lorenzo's Texas Air Corporation, started a competing shuttle service in 1980 with DC-9s. Lorenzo acquired Eastern in 1986, and had to sell New York Air's shuttle service to Pan American World Airways (Pan Am) to get Department of Justice antitrust clearance. By 1986 the two shuttles were in intense competition; Pan Am had a market share of around 45 percent and touted its full-service product in comparison to Eastern's no-frills product.

In 1987 Lorenzo unsuccessfully tried to sell the Eastern shuttle to his own Texas Air Corporation, apparently for the purpose of transferring cash out of Eastern in the form of advisory fees. Eastern's labor unions challenged the sale in federal court and won a judgment requiring union bargaining in connection with the sale. By then, the shuttle was one of the few profitable operations under the Eastern brand.

== Sale ==
In October 1988 the shuttle's ground rights and 17 aircraft were sold to Donald Trump to form the Trump Shuttle with the first flight in June 1989. Just a year later the company was in financial default and surrendered to become Shuttle INC. which USAir entered into an agreement to operate in 1992, then bought in 1997. The shuttle service began as the USAir Shuttle, which is presently known as the American Airlines Shuttle. (Pan Am's competing shuttle service was bought by Delta Air Lines in 1991, and became the Delta Shuttle.)

== Fleet ==
- Lockheed 1049 Super Constellation
- Lockheed L-188 Electra
- Douglas DC-9
- Boeing 727
- Airbus A300

== See also ==
- List of defunct airlines of the United States
