= American Airlines Shuttle =

Air shuttle service in the United States (2015–2021)

| IATA | ICAO | Call sign |
|---|---|---|
| AA | AAL | AMERICAN |
- Founded: October 17, 2015
- Ceased operations: November 9, 2021
- AOC #: AALA025A
- Frequent-flyer program: AAdvantage
- Alliance: Oneworld (affiliate; 2015–2021)
- Destinations: Boston; Chicago–O'Hare; New York–LaGuardia; Washington–National
- Parent company: American Airlines Group
- Traded as: Nasdaq: AAL
- Headquarters: CentrePort, Fort Worth, Texas, United States
- Key people: Doug Parker (Chairman & CEO); Robert Isom (President); Bette Nash (flight attendant)
- Revenue: See parent
- Operating income: See parent
- Net income: See parent
- Total assets: See parent
- Total equity: See parent
- Website: www.aa.com/i18n/travel-info/experience/american-airlines-shuttle.jsp

American Airlines Shuttle was the brand name for American Airlines' hourly air shuttle service operating in the Northeastern United States. It served Boston Logan International Airport in Boston, LaGuardia Airport in New York City, Ronald Reagan Washington National Airport in Washington, D.C., and Chicago O'Hare International Airport in Chicago. American Airlines discontinued the Shuttle product in 2021 due to the effects of the COVID-19 pandemic.

== History ==
The brand was transferred to American Airlines after its final integration with US Airways was completed on October 17, 2015. It is the descendant of the original Eastern Air Lines Shuttle, which began operating in 1961, and in subsequent iterations operated as Trump Shuttle, USAir Shuttle, and US Airways Shuttle. Its direct rival was Delta Shuttle, the corporate descendant of Pan Am Shuttle.

In 2021, American discontinued the Shuttle product due to the effects of the COVID-19 pandemic resulting in a large drop in business traffic. American Airlines was forced to reduce service to less than hourly in all four markets during the height of the pandemic. Hourly service has since been reinstated in the Chicago-LaGuardia and the Washington D.C-LaGuardia market. All remaining routes are no longer marketed as American Airlines Shuttle and service is the same as any other short-haul domestic flights.

American Airlines also ceded the LaGuardia to Boston route to JetBlue as part of their Northeast Alliance, though the route was restarted in October 2023 once the Northeast Alliance was blocked by the U.S Department of Justice.

== Services ==
American Airlines Shuttle offered hourly weekday flights between the four cities. There were slight schedule changes for weekend flights, with Saturday flights primarily departing in the morning/afternoon and Sunday flights mostly hourly or every other hour.

Shuttle flights had dedicated check-in facilities and baggage carousels, workstations at gates in Boston, complimentary snacks and alcoholic beverages in all cabins, and other services.

== Fleet ==
The American Airlines Shuttle utilized its Airbus A319, Embraer 175, and Boeing 737 aircraft.

American Airlines Shuttle Fleet
| Aircraft | Passengers | | | Routes | Notes |
| Aircraft | F | Y | Total | Routes | Notes |
|---|---|---|---|---|---|
| Embraer 175 | 12 | 64 | 76 | Washington – New York | Operated by Republic Airways |
| Airbus A319-100 | 8 | 120 | 128 | Washington – Boston New York – Boston |
| Boeing 737-800 | 16 | 156 | 172 | Chicago – New York |
