= Rio de Janeiro-São Paulo air bridge =

Brazilian air shuttle

Rio de Janeiro-São Paulo Aerial Bridge
- Native name: Portuguese: Ponte Aérea
- Industry: Aviation
- Founded: July 5, 1959; 67 years ago
- Founders: Varig; Cruzeiro do Sul; VASP

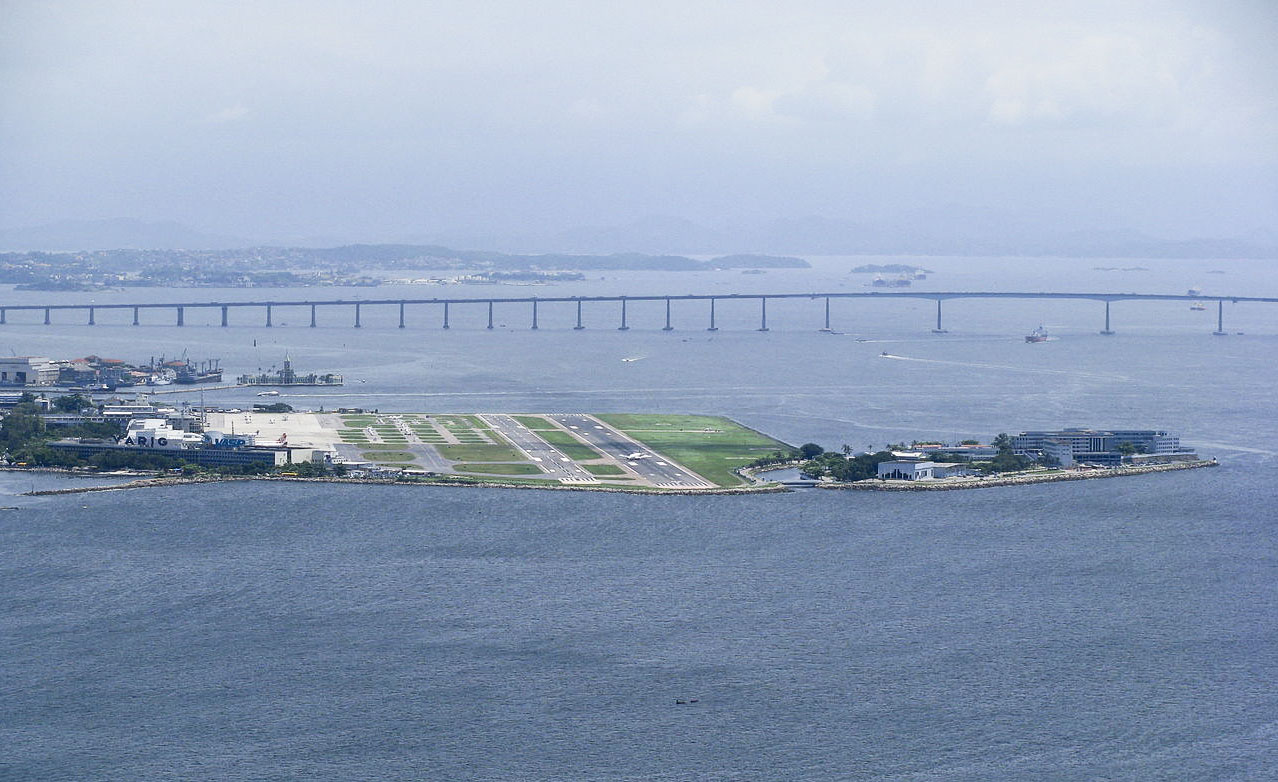
Santos Dumont airport in Rio de Janeiro

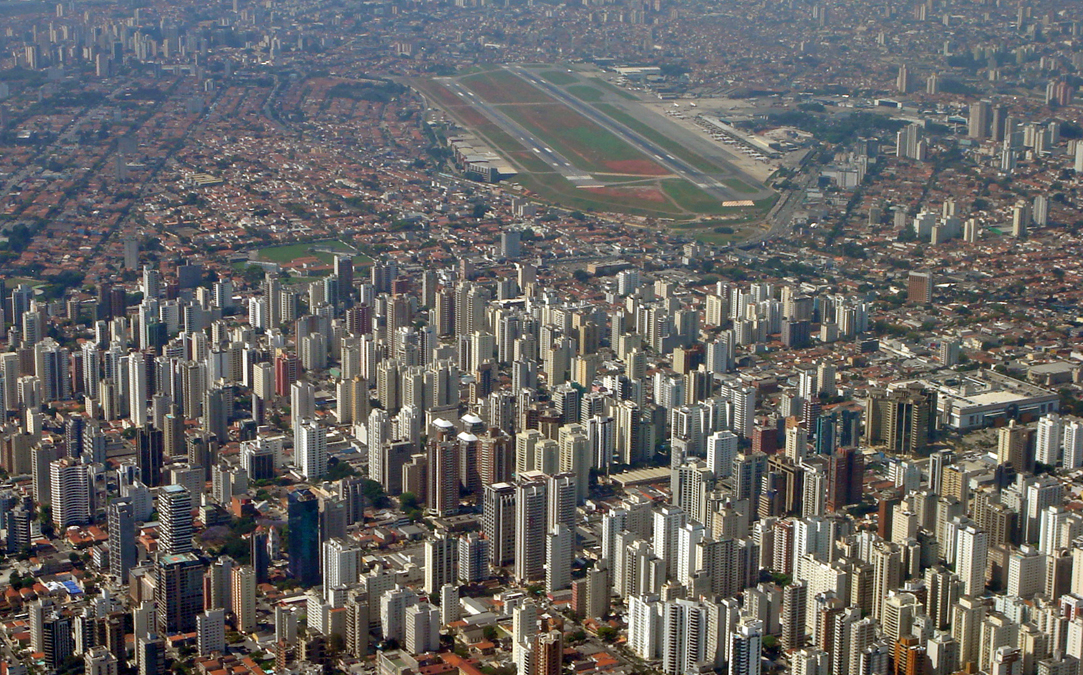
Congonhas airport in São Paulo

The Rio de Janeiro-São Paulo Aerial Bridge (Portuguese: Ponte Aérea) is a Brazilian air shuttle run by various airlines between Santos Dumont airport in Rio de Janeiro and Congonhas airport in São Paulo. It was inaugurated on 5 July 1959 by the airlines Varig, Cruzeiro do Sul and VASP making it the first air shuttle in the world. It is now operated by LATAM, Gol and Azul. More than 120 flights operate daily between the two cities with an average of one flight every 10 minutes, between the hours of 06:00 and 22:00.

On February 10, 2007, Gol introduced the Boeing 737-800 Short Field Performance (SFP) aircraft into the service. This model was developed by Boeing at the request of the company as Santos Dumont airport has one of the shortest commercial runways in the world at 1,323 metres (4,341 ft).
