= Mainline (air travel) =

Airline industry term

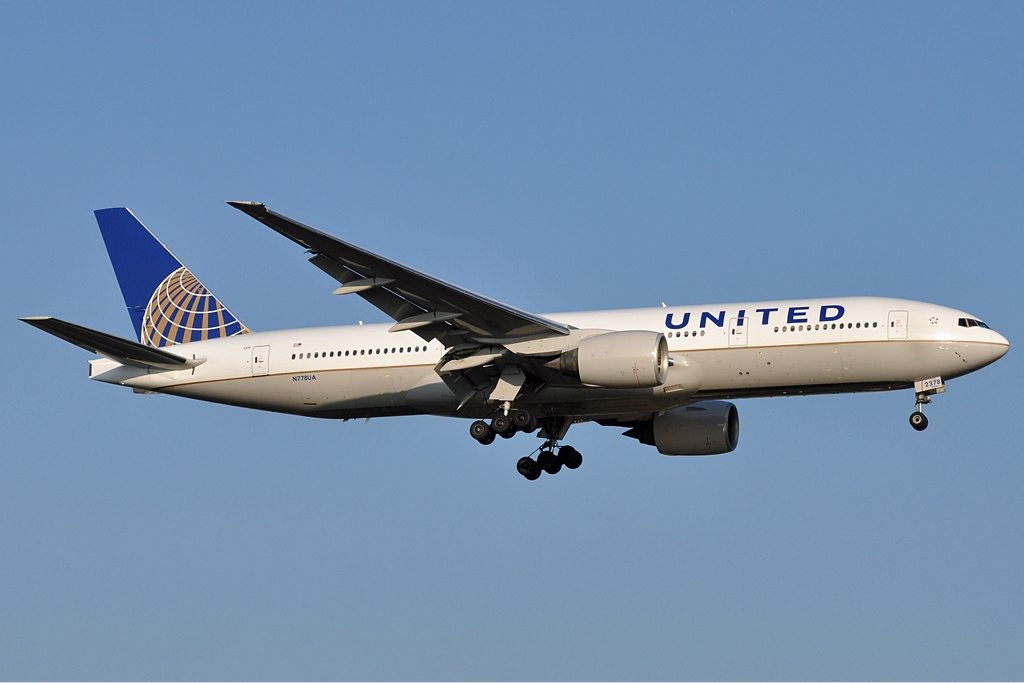
A mainline flight by a United Airlines Boeing 777-200ER landing at Amsterdam Schiphol Airport in February 2011.

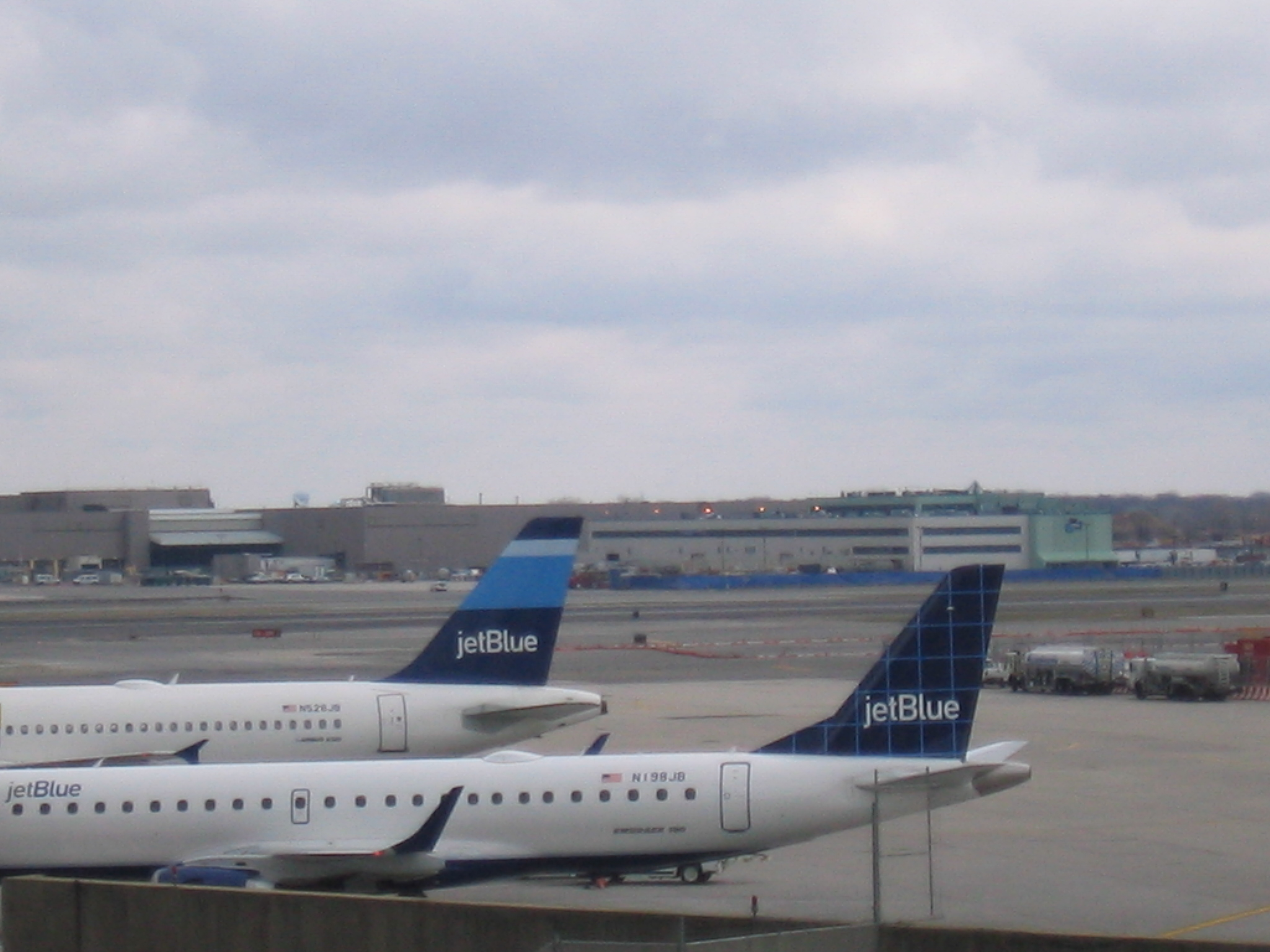
JetBlue Airbus A320 and Embraer E190 at John F. Kennedy International Airport in March 2006. Unlike many other airlines, JetBlue's mainline equipment included the Embraer E190 until September 2025. On traditional legacy carriers, such operations on the smaller aircraft are mostly outsourced to smaller, usually independently owned regional airlines.

A mainline flight is a flight operated by an airline's main operating unit, rather than by regional alliances, regional code-shares, regional subsidiaries, or wholly owned subsidiaries offering low-cost operations. Mainline carriers typically operate between hub airports within their network and on international or long-haul services, using narrow-body and wide-body aircraft. This is in contrast to regional airlines, providing feeder services to hub airports operating smaller turboprop or regional jet aircraft, or low-cost carrier subsidiaries serving leisure markets.

In the United States, examples of mainline passenger airline flights include those operated by American Airlines, Delta Air Lines, and United Airlines; but not flights operated by regional airlines like Envoy Air, Mesa Airlines, Piedmont Airlines, or PSA Airlines with regional jets or the services of regional airline marketing brands such as American Eagle, Delta Connection, or United Express aboard lower-capacity narrowbody jets and turboprop aircraft, such as those produced by Embraer or Bombardier, that do not have transcontinental range.

U.S. legacy carriers may operate branded mainline services using the same flight crews and AOC as that of their mainline operations. For example, United p.s. and American Flagship Service cater to the medium-haul transcontinental business segment. Short-haul air shuttles, such as Delta Shuttle, operate at high frequency intervals between busy city pairs. Previously, U.S. legacy carriers operated low-cost air services within their mainline operations to compete with low-cost carriers; these operations were short-lived and included brands such as Continental Lite, Song (Delta), and Ted (United). Outside the U.S., low-cost carrier subsidiary airlines are more common, with examples including Air Canada Rouge, Jetstar (subsidiary of Qantas), and Eurowings (subsidiary of Lufthansa).

An airline carrier's collective bargaining agreement with flight crews stipulates the maximum seating capacity of regional aircraft; as such, any aircraft that exceeds this capacity must operate as a mainline flight. The converse is not the case; mainline flight crews, with proper type ratings, may operate aircraft that are smaller than typical mainline aircraft.

== Mainline subsidiary carriers and airline within an airline brands ==
Mainline Air Carrier	Banner marketing & brands (Air divisions operating as)	Larger-medium longer range jet airliner subsidiary brands	Smaller-regional shorter range airliner subsidiaries
Flag – Legacy – Major
Air Canada	Air Canada Express	Air Canada Rouge
Air France; KLM (Air France-KLM)	Air France Hop	KLM Cityhopper Transavia Transavia France
Air India (Air India Limited)		Air India Express
Alaska Airlines (Alaska Air Group)	Alaska Horizon Alaska SkyWest		Horizon Air
All Nippon Airways		Air Japan ANA Wings^{1} Peach
American Airlines (American Airlines Group)	American Eagle		Envoy Air PSA Airlines Piedmont Airlines
Delta Air Lines	Delta Connection Delta Shuttle		Endeavor Air
EgyptAir		Air Cairo
El Al	Sun d'Or Up
Garuda Indonesia	Explore Explore Jet	Citilink
Aeromexico (Grupo Aeromexico)	Aeromexico Connect		Aeromexico Connect
Aer Lingus; British Airways; Iberia Airlines (International Airlines Group)	Aer Lingus Regional BA CityFlyer Level	Iberia Express Vueling	BA CityFlyer BA Euroflyer
Japan Airlines	Jetstar Japan	Japan Transocean Air^{1}	J-Air Japan Air Commuter Ryukyu Air Commuter
Kenya Airways		Jambojet
Korean Air Lines (Hanjin Group)		Jin Air
Asiana Airlines (Kumho Asiana Group)		Air Busan Air Seoul
LATAM Brasil; LATAM Chile (LATAM Airlines Group)	LATAM (Colombia) LATAM (Ecuador) LATAM (Perú)	LATAM Express LATAM Paraguay
LOT Polish Airlines
Austrian Airlines; Brussels Airlines; Lufthansa; Swiss International Air Lines (Lufthansa Air Group)	Eurowings Lufthansa Regional	Discover Airlines Edelweiss Air Eurowings SunExpress	Air Dolomiti Lufthansa CityLine
Philippine Airlines (PAL Holdings Inc.)			PAL Express
Royal Air Maroc			Royal Air Maroc Express
Scandinavian Airlines (SAS Group)	d/b/a Scandinavian, CityJet
Singapore Airlines		Scoot
Thai Airways (Thai Ministry of Finance)		Nok Air
Czech Airlines (Travel Service)	SmartWings
Qantas	Jetstar Japan QantasLink	Jetstar	Eastern Australia Airlines National Jet Systems Network Aviation Sunstate Airlines
Vietnam Airlines		Air Cambodia Pacific Airlines	Vietnam Air Services Company
United Airlines (United Airlines Holdings)	United Express United p.s.
Discount - ULCC Virtuals
Cebu Pacific			Cebgo
JetBlue	JetBlue Mint
Jetstar Asia (Westbrook Holdings)
Jetstar Japan
Norwegian's Airline Group^{2} (Norwegian Air Shuttle)	Norwegian	Norwegian Air Shuttle
TUI's Airline Group^{2} (TUI Group)	TUI fly	Corsair International TUI fly Belgium TUI fly Deutschland TUI fly Netherlands TUI fly Nordic TUI Airways
Virgin Australia (Virgin Australia Holdings)	Virgin Australia	Virgin Australia Regional Airlines^{1}
WestJet			WestJet Encore

Notes:

^{1}Though not part of the main "legacy airline" or "flag carrier", these particular airlines are often described as "regional airlines" by the mainline airline counterparts they are affiliated or owned by.
^{2}These airline businesses resultant of airline liberalization in Europe, really do not have a "mainline brand", but do have unified brandings across multiple individual airline certificates forming "virtual airlines" much like the American Eagle, Delta Connection, and United Express banner branded regional airlines in the United States.

=== North American mainline carrier's regional affiliates ===
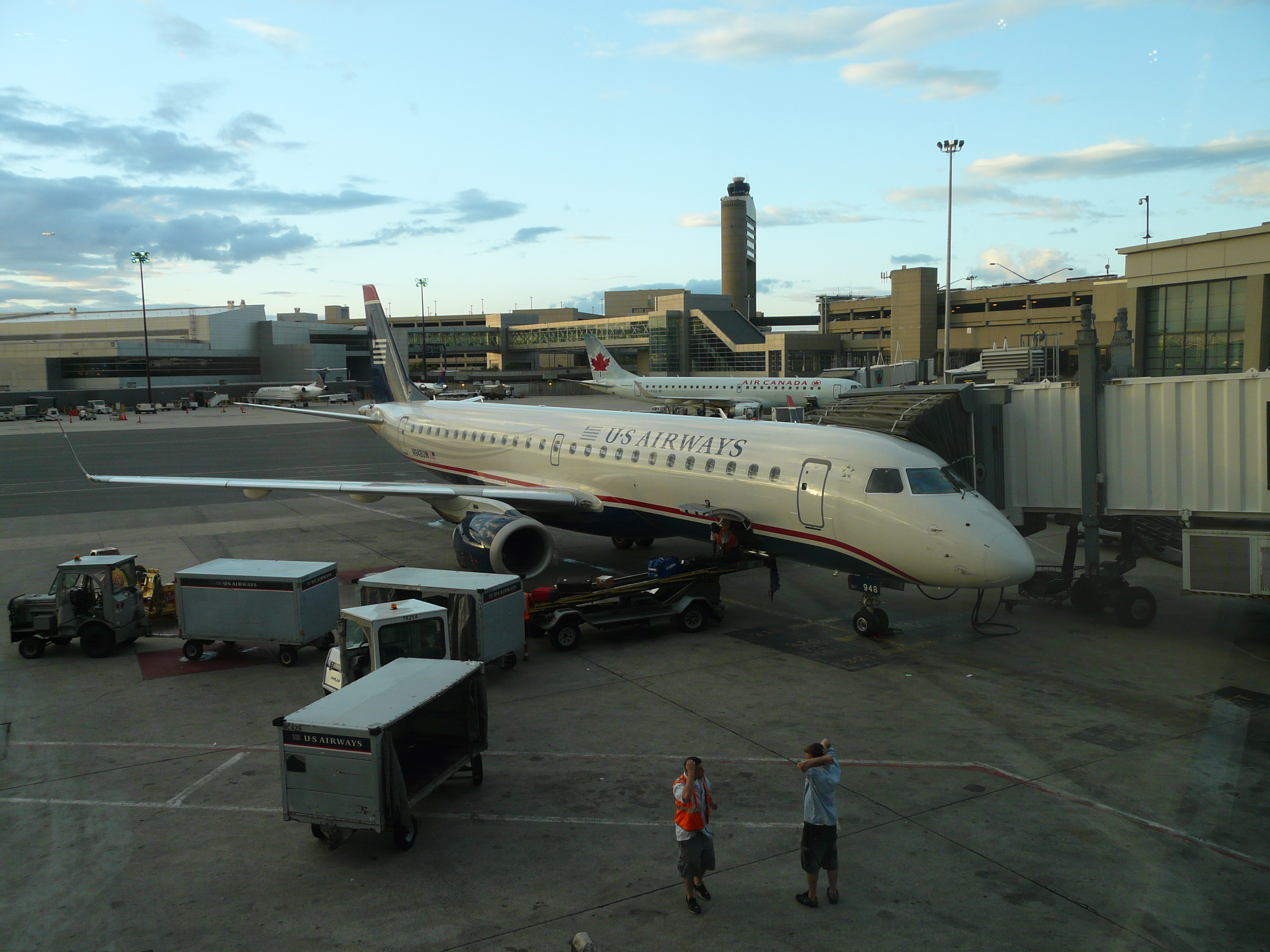
Embraer E-190 on US Airways at Logan International Airport in August 2008. Similarly to JetBlue, US Airways and at one time, Air Canada both operated the Embraer 190 as part of their mainline fleets.

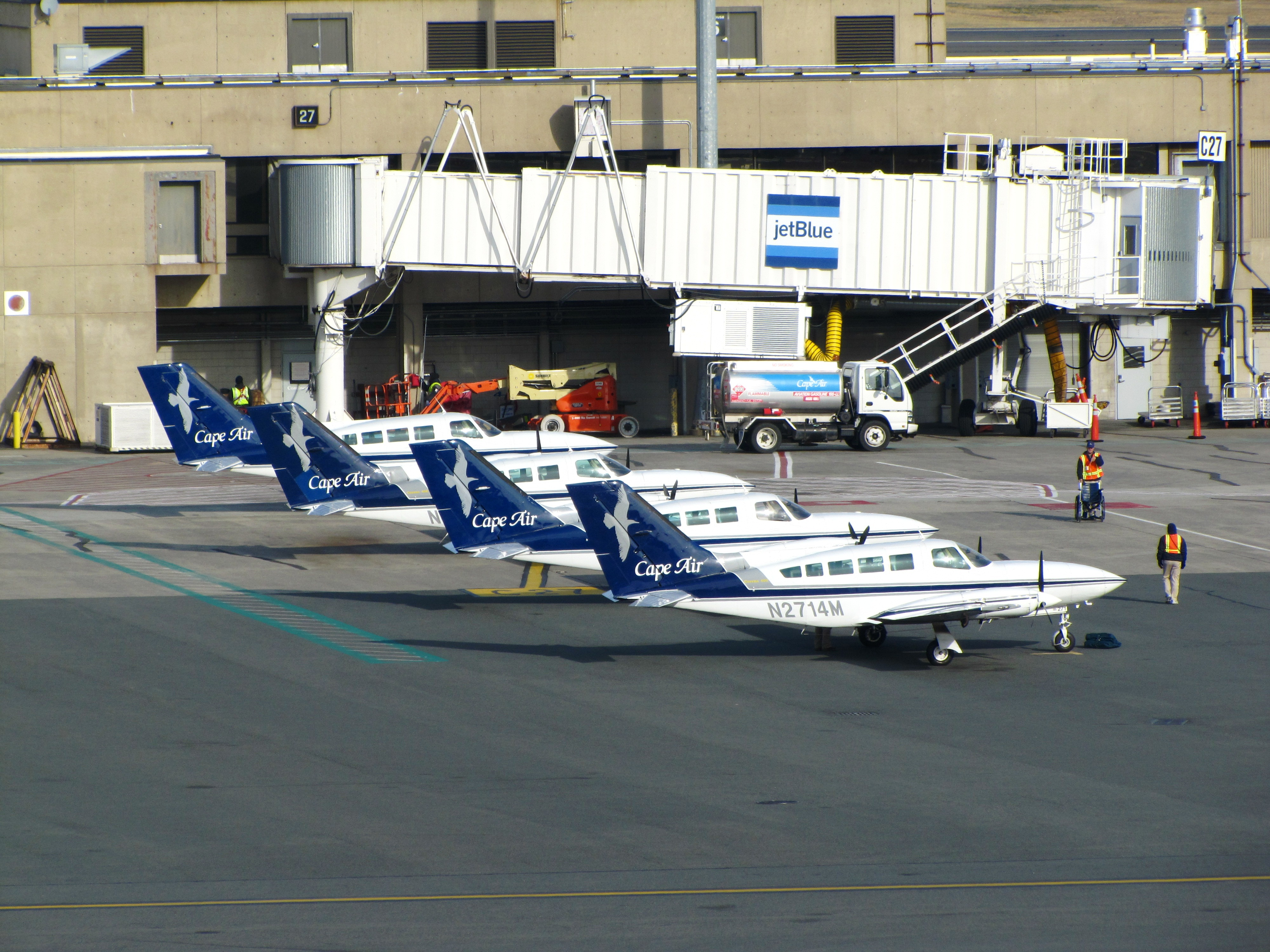
JetBlue's affiliate Cape Air at Logan International Airport in December 2011.

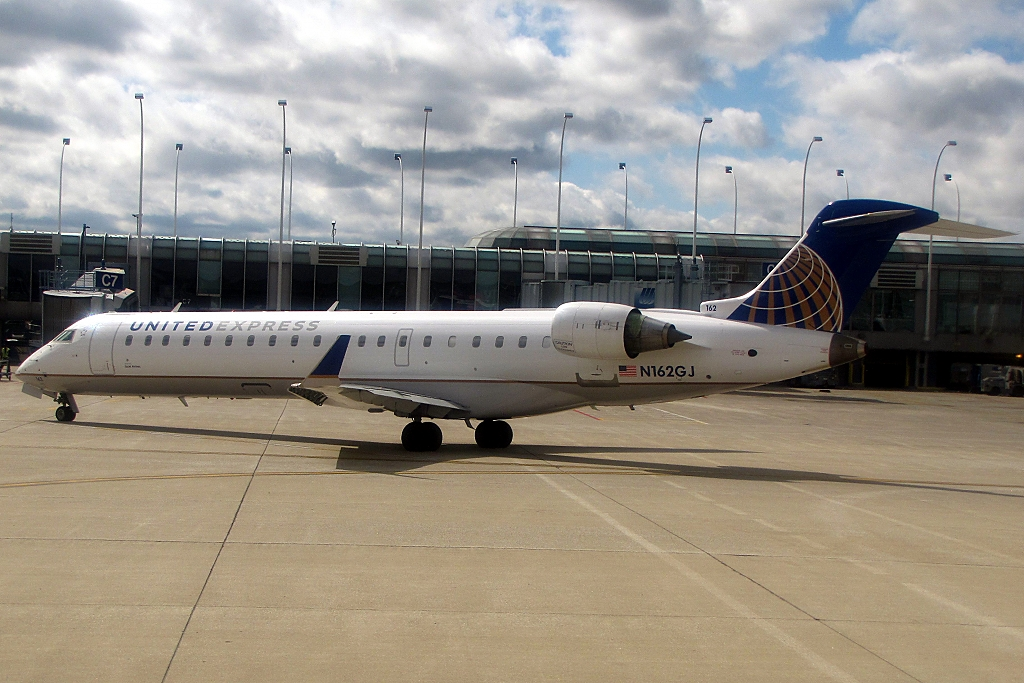
United's affiliate GoJet at O'Hare International Airport in full United Express colors in April 2012.

Mainline Airline	Regional Marketing Brand ^{1}	Regional Airline Affiliates^{2} (Independently Owned)
Flag carriers
Aeromexico	Aeromexico Connect	No regional affiliate
Air Canada	Air Canada Express	Exploits Valley Air Services^{4} Jazz^{4}
Legacy carriers
Alaska Airlines	Alaska Horizon Alaska SkyWest	SkyWest Airlines^{4}
American Airlines	American Eagle	See: American Eagle
Delta Air Lines	Delta Connection	See: Delta Connection
Hawaiian Airlines	'Ohana by Hawaiian	Empire Airlines
United Airlines	United Express	See: United Express
Scheduled Network /Major carriers
JetBlue Airways	No regional brand	Cape Air^{3}
WestJet	WestJet Encore	Pacific Coastal Airlines
Low-cost
Southwest Airlines	No regional brand	No regional affiliate
Sun Country Airlines	No regional brand	No regional affiliate
ULCC’s
Allegiant Airlines	No regional brand	No regional affiliate
Frontier Airlines	No regional brand	No regional affiliate
Spirit Airlines	No regional brand	No regional affiliate
Volaris	No regional brand	No regional affiliate

Notes:
^{1} Branding used for regional feeder service and commuter flights. Operated either by a regional subsidiary or under contract by an independent regional airline.
^{2}These airlines are independent and not subsidiaries of mainline air carriers.
^{3} These independent airlines operate regional aircraft under codeshare agreements with a mainline carrier.
^{4} Independent airlines operating under a capacity purchase agreement with their mainline partner

== See also ==
- Flag carrier
