= Bette Nash =

Longest-serving flight attendant (1935–2024)

- Born: Mary Elizabeth Burke; December 31, 1935; Pleasantville, New Jersey, U.S.
- Died: May 17, 2024 (aged 88); Manassas, Virginia, U.S.
- Occupation: Flight attendant
- Years active: 1957–2024
- Known for: World's longest serving flight attendant
- Children: 1

Mary Elizabeth Burke-Nash (December 31, 1935 – May 17, 2024) was an American flight attendant who was recognized as the world's longest-serving flight attendant in 2022 by Guinness World Records. She worked for various airlines in a career spanning over 65 years.

== Early life ==
Mary Elizabeth Burke was born on December 31, 1935, and raised in Pleasantville, New Jersey, just outside Atlantic City. She had two younger sisters. She worked summer jobs on the Boardwalk. She studied business at Sacred Heart College.

== Career ==
After working as a legal secretary, she was hired on November 4, 1957, by Eastern Air Lines in Miami. After attending its charm school, she became a stewardess in 1958. She transferred to Washington, D.C., in 1961. She mostly worked on the Eastern Air Lines Shuttle from Washington, D.C., New York City, and Boston so that she could return home to care for her son, who has Down syndrome and attention deficit hyperactivity disorder. From June 1989, she worked for Trump Shuttle after the Eastern Air Line Shuttle's ground rights and 17 aircraft were sold to Donald Trump. Just a year later the company was in financial default, with Nash subsequently continuing with its successor US Airways Shuttle, which became the American Airlines Shuttle in 2015 following the merger of US Airways and American Airlines.

For her 50th anniversary as a flight attendant, US Airways honored Nash with a party at Reagan National Airport, including a water salute, typically only reserved for retiring captains or officers. In 2022, Nash was named the longest-serving flight attendant by Guinness World Records.

== Personal life and death ==
In 1973, she married James Nash, and they had a son. At the time of her death, Nash lived in Manassas, Virginia.

Nash entered hospice care after being diagnosed with breast cancer, but never officially retired. She died on May 17, 2024, at the age of 88, after working for 67 years.
