= US Airways Shuttle =

Air shuttle service of the United States (1992–2015)

IATA	ICAO	Call sign
TB	USS	US SHUTTLE
- Commenced operations: April 12, 1992 (as USAir Shuttle); February 27, 1997 (as US Airways Shuttle)
- Ceased operations: February 27, 1997 (as USAir Shuttle); July 1, 2000 (as US Airways Shuttle)
- Hubs: LaGuardia Airport
- Frequent-flyer program: Dividend Miles
- Parent company: US Airways
- Key people: Bette Nash (flight attendant)

US Airways Shuttle was the brand name for US Airways' hourly air shuttle service operating in the Northeastern United States. It served Logan International Airport in Boston, LaGuardia Airport in New York City, and Ronald Reagan Washington National Airport in Washington, D.C.

The shuttle had various food and beverage offerings that included:

- Breakfast snack served on morning flights before 9 a.m. on business days
- Complimentary soft drinks, juices, coffee and tea
- Complimentary beer and wine after 10 a.m.

First class service was available on all Shuttle flights. Complimentary spirits were offered in addition to the economy offerings.

On October 17, 2015, the shuttle service became known as American Airlines Shuttle.

== History ==
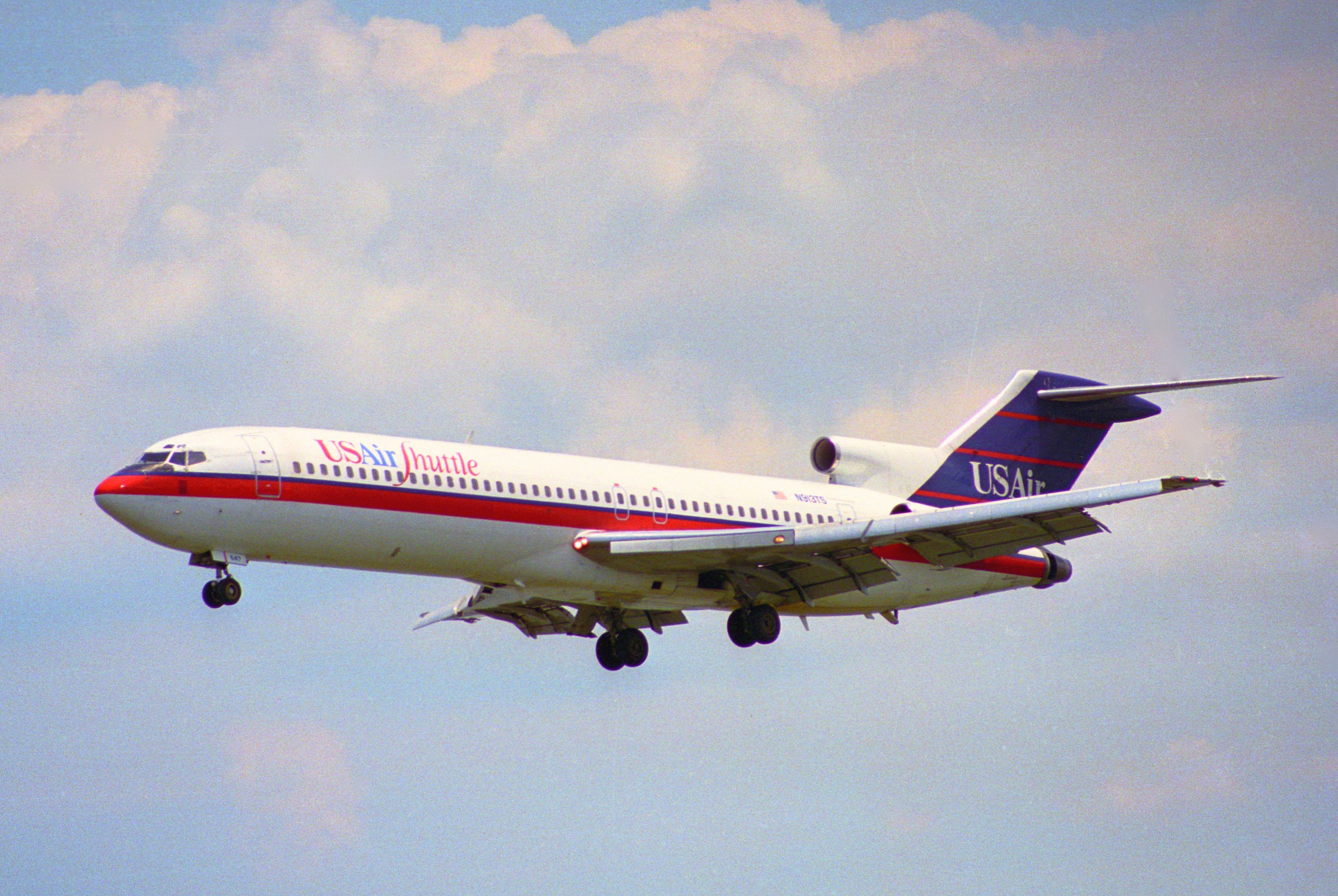
A USAir Shuttle Boeing 727-200 at Ronald Reagan Washington National Airport

The US Airways Shuttle was the descendant of the Eastern Air Lines Shuttle, which established service on the route in 1961. Real estate mogul and future (later 45th and 47th) US President Donald Trump purchased the shuttle from Eastern Air Lines in 1989, during a time when Eastern was being dismantled by Texas Air Corporation. The service was briefly operated as the Trump Shuttle from June 7, 1989, until the company defaulted on loans in September 1990. After the Trump venture failed, ownership passed to a syndicate of 22 lenders to the venture, led by Citigroup.

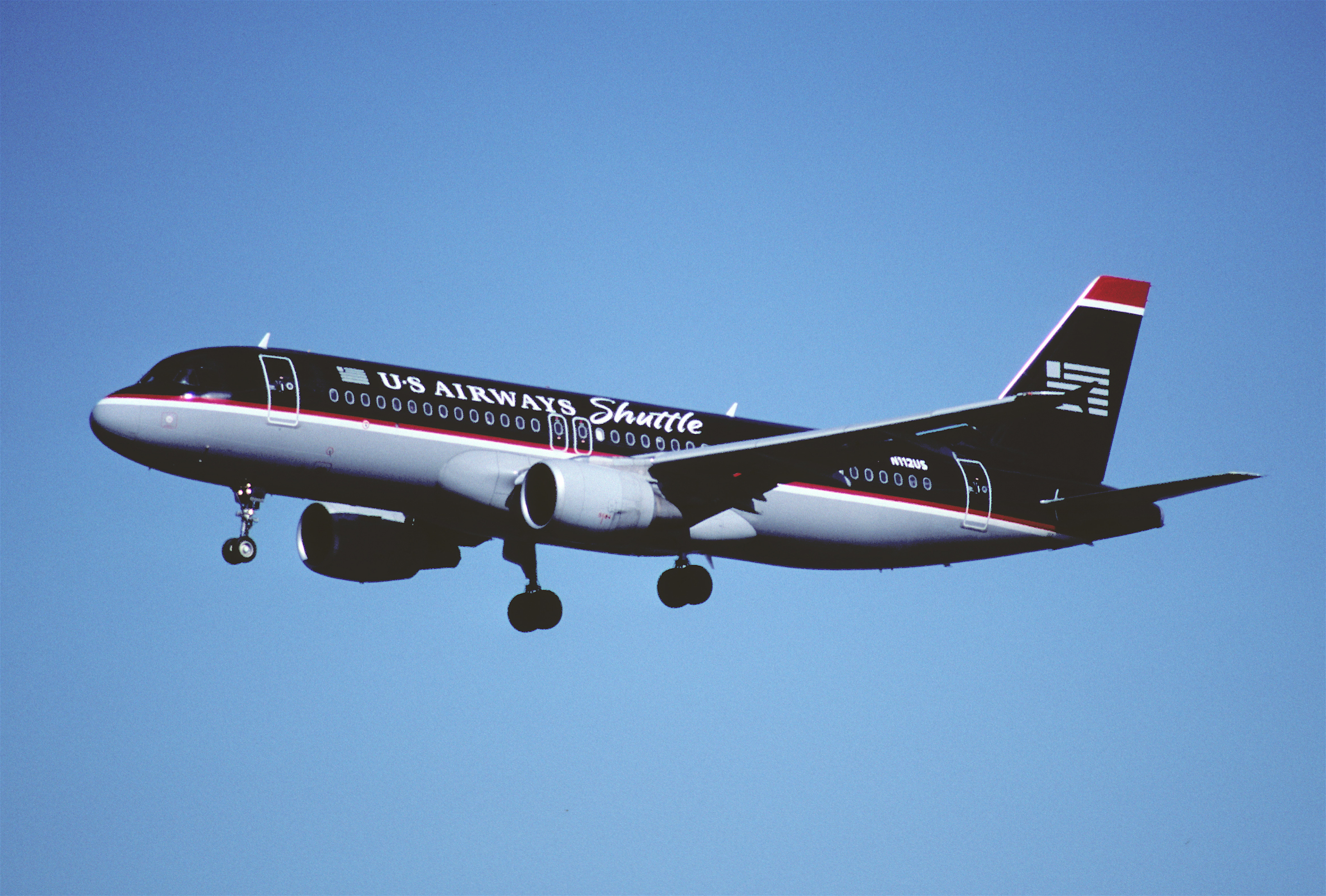
A US Airways Shuttle Airbus A320-200 landing at LaGuardia Airport (2001)

Unable to sell the operation outright to Northwest Airlines, American Airlines, or USAir Group, the banks negotiated a complex marketing arrangement in which USAir Group would assume 40% ownership of Shuttle, Inc. and would manage the operation for ten years, including selling tickets, keeping financial records, advertising and marketing, aircraft maintenance, and labor relations. On April 7, 1992, Trump Shuttle ceased to exist when it was merged into a new corporation, Shuttle, Inc., which began operating as the USAir Shuttle on April 12.

The Shuttle, Inc. agreement gave USAir an option to purchase the entire shuttle operation on or after October 10, 1996, with an exclusive right to do so until April 10, 1997. USAir Group subsequently announced its intent to exercise its right to purchase the remaining 60% of Shuttle, Inc. on November 19, 1997, but "continued to operate the US Airways Shuttle separately from the rest of the airline. Employees of the Shuttle also operated on a separate seniority list, since the company operated as a wholly-owned subsidiary of US Airways Group".

Shuttle Inc. remained as a subsidiary of US Airways Group until July 1, 2000, when "the US Airways Shuttle merged into the mainline operation of US Airways." US Airways Group, as the USAir Group is now known due to the merger with America West Airlines, repainted their aircraft to remove the "Shuttle" part from the name. As an "airline with an airline," and a subsidiary and operating division of the USAir Group, the US Airways Shuttle no longer exists.

However, the Northeast service of frequent shuttle flights and strategic marketing by way of the New "merged" US Airways under the US Airways Group, did continue to operate without being considered a separate division or subsidiary airline. During this time, US Airways Shuttle briefly expanded service to Dulles International Airport, near Washington DC, in addition to service to Washington's Reagan Airport. This service ended soon after the terrorist attacks of September 11, 2001.

All planes on the shuttle routes had a single-class configuration until 2004 when first-class seats were added.

== Fleet ==
=== Passenger ===
The US Airways Shuttle was operated by American Airlines utilizing its Airbus A319 and Embraer 190 aircraft.

US Airways Shuttle Fleet
Aircraft	Passengers			Routes	Notes
Aircraft	F	Y	Total	Routes	Notes
Airbus A319-100	12	112	124	Boston (BOS) – Washington (DCA)	Utilizes US Airways fleet
Embraer 190	11	88	99	New York (LGA) – Boston (BOS) New York (LGA) – Washington (DCA)	Utilizes US Airways fleet

=== Retired ===
- Airbus A320-200
- Boeing 727-200
- Boeing 737-300
- McDonnell Douglas DC-9-30

== See also ==
- List of defunct airlines of the United States
