= Air shuttle =

Type of airline service

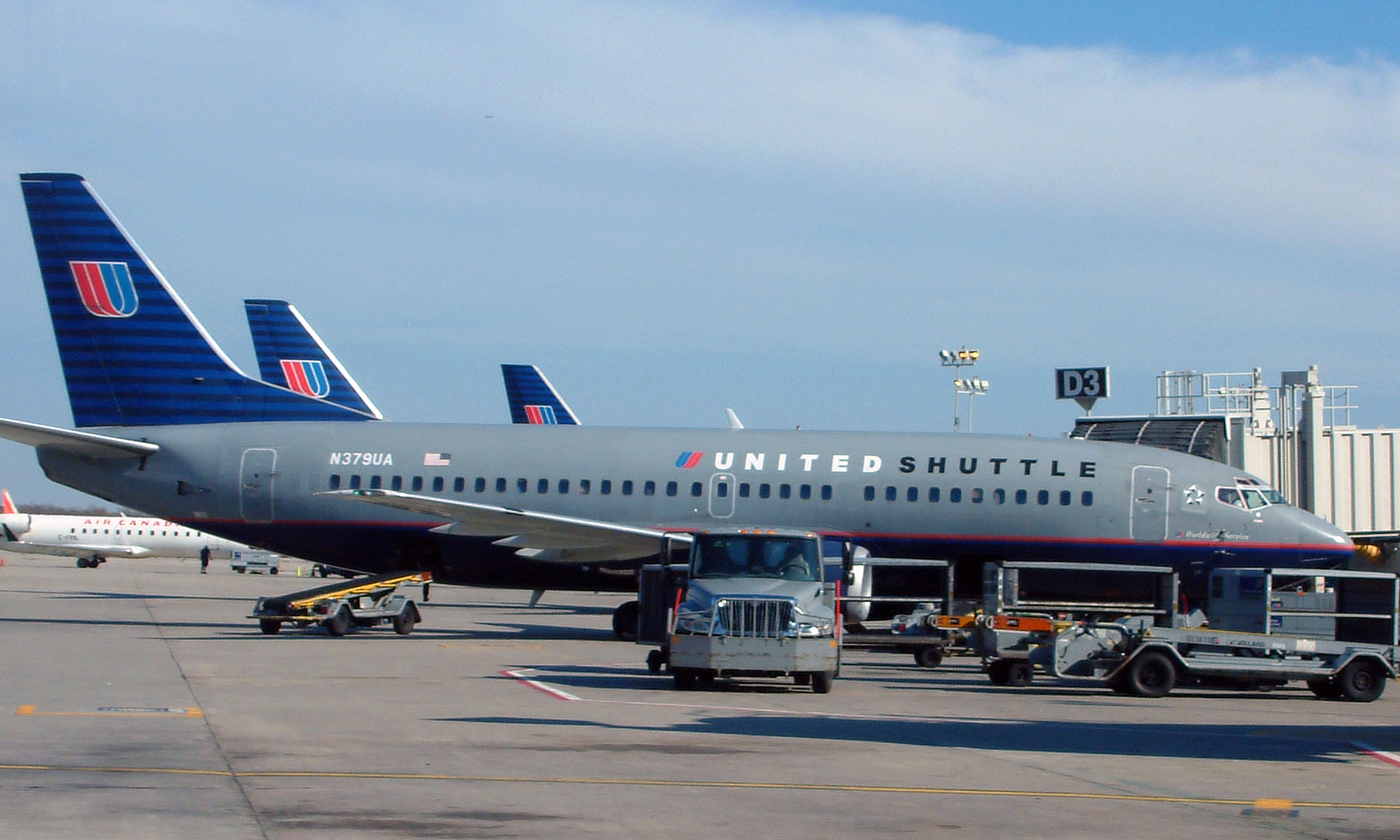
Former United Shuttle Boeing 737 parked at a gate at Philadelphia International Airport

An air shuttle is a scheduled airline service on short routes with a simplified fare and class structure. No exact definition exists, but the frequency is usually an hour or less and travel time is typically an hour or less. Network airlines may operate shuttle services as one-class or no-frill services, similar to low-cost airlines.

Some shuttles are established by governments, businesses, or organizations which require a high level of service in an otherwise thin corridor. For example, the Federal Aviation Administration's William J. Hughes Technical Center in Atlantic City, New Jersey operates an air shuttle to ferry FAA employees to and from Reagan National Airport (DCA) near Washington, DC four days a week.

Certain markets support commercial shuttles. The pioneer service was the Rio de Janeiro-São Paulo air bridge in Brazil which began 5 July 1959. Other early services include the Eastern Air Shuttle, inaugurated in 1961, which offered no-frills, hourly flights connecting LaGuardia Airport in New York City with Washington National Airport and Logan International Airport in Boston, Massachusetts.

Air shuttles increasingly face competition from high-speed rail and many airlines withdraw from the market or reduce service shortly after competing high-speed rail services start.

Present-day commercial air shuttle services include:

- Aeroflot has a frequent service between the cities of Moscow and Saint Petersburg in Russia. It is now increasingly competing with Sapsan service by Russian Railways along the same route.
- Air Canada’s RapidAir service between Toronto and Montreal as well as Toronto and Ottawa in Canada. The route is also served by WestJet Simplicity service and Porter Airlines with up to 200 flights every weekday between the three cities. Air Canada also offers hourly flights between Toronto and Vancouver. However, these flights last at least 4.5 hours.
- Air France La Navette service offers 80 flights a day from Paris-Orly Airport to Marseille, Bordeaux, Nice, and Toulouse, with a flight every 30–60 minutes. This service is used by more than 5.6 million travellers every year. LGV Méditerranée opening in 2001 and LGV Sud-Ouest opening in 2017 now connect Marseille and Bordeaux to Paris in under four hours, while extensions to Nice and Toulouse are planned. Paris-Toulouse is France's busiest air route. It was Paris-Lyon prior to the introduction of TGV service.
- Air New Zealand operates about 20 flights every day from Auckland to Wellington and Christchurch (3 of New Zealand's largest cities) using Airbus A320s, with up to half-hourly services during peak hours. There are also approximately 15 daily flights between Wellington and Christchurch using a mix of their mainline jets and the turboprop regional aircraft operated by Air New Zealand Link.
- Alitalia (now ITA Airways) made about 60 flights per day between Rome Fiumicino and Milano Linate Airport in a service called ROMAMILANO. At the two airports the check-in counters and security checkpoints were reserved for the passengers of this service.
- American Airlines Shuttle, founded as Eastern Air Lines Shuttle then Trump Shuttle then US Airways Shuttle facing increasing competition from the Acela Express since 2000
- Azul, GOL and LATAM Brasil's Ponte Aérea (Air Bridge) service between São Paulo and Rio de Janeiro in Brazil, every 10 minutes for an average total of 120 flights per day. Santos Dumont Airport is Rio’s airport while São Paulo–Congonhas Airport is São Paulo’s airport.
- Delta Shuttle is a shuttle serving the northeastern United States.
- Finnair and Norwegian Air Shuttle provide frequent service over the day between Helsinki Airport and Oulu Airport.
- Horizon Air service between Seattle Tacoma International Airport and Portland International Airport and Spokane International Airport.
- Iberia Puente Aéreo service between Madrid and Barcelona in Spain every 30 minutes. It is heavily reduced since the opening of the Madrid-Barcelona High-Speed Rail line
- Japan Airlines and All Nippon Airways service between Tokyo (Tokyo International Airport, Narita International Airport) and Osaka (Osaka International Airport, Kansai International Airport, Kobe Airport) in Japan
- Korean Air, Asiana Airlines and other smaller Korean airlines' service between Gimpo International Airport and Jeju International Airport.
- Lufthansa offers an up to 30-minute headways service between Berlin Brandenburg Airport, Frankfurt Airport, Munich Airport and Hamburg Airport. It offers in addition an hourly service between Frankfurt Airport and London-Heathrow Airport, Frankfurt Airport and Brussels Airport. In cooperation with Austrian Airlines they offer a shuttle between Frankfurt Airport and Vienna Airport. On the Berlin-Frankfurt and on the Berlin-Munich route competes directly with the ICE Sprinter.
- Scandinavian Airlines (SAS) and Norwegian Air Shuttle provide a shuttle service between the Norwegian airports of Oslo Airport, Gardermoen and Bergen Airport, Flesland; Trondheim Airport, Værnes and Stavanger Airport, Sola with up to 30-minute headways. Both companies also operate shuttle services, with up to hourly-headways, between Stockholm-Arlanda Airport and Göteborg Landvetter Airport, Stockholm Arlanda Airport and Malmö Airport and between Copenhagen Airport and Aalborg Airport.
- Singapore Airlines and Malaysia Airlines code-share an hourly Kuala Lumpur-Singapore shuttle.
- South African Airways and Mango provide an air shuttle service between OR Tambo International Airport and Cape Town International Airport with up to half-hourly headways
- TAP Portugal's Ponte Aérea (Air Bridge) service between Lisbon and Porto in Portugal.
- Turkish Airlines and Pegasus Airlines 64 daily flight between İstanbul Atatürk Airport and Izmir Airport. This route is the second-busiest route in Europe.
- SAS also has a shuttle on the triangular route between Oslo Airport, Gardermoen (Norway), Stockholm-Arlanda Airport (Sweden) and Copenhagen Airport (Denmark) with up to hourly headways.
- The Carrasco International Airport in Uruguay has an air bridge to Buenos Aires airports Aeroparque Jorge Newbery and Ezeiza International Airport.
- The route between Dublin and London is served by over 640 flights each week, with departures occurring on average every 20 minutes in each direction. The majority of the flights are operated by Aer Lingus, Ryanair and British Airways but CityJet also operates on the route. The route competes for the title of the busiest international air route in the world.
- The routes between Hong Kong and Taipei, Taiwan (Republic of China), and between Hong Kong and Bangkok, Thailand, are served by multiple carriers providing frequent service with a frequency less than an hour during day time.
- Qantas and QantasLink 'CityFlyer' service offers flights between major Australian capital cities on weekdays, with complimentary alcoholic afternoon drinks, newspapers, flexible fares and more frequent schedules. Flights between Sydney & Melbourne, and Brisbane & Sydney both take approximately 1 hour and 30 minutes of flight time.

The busiest air routes in the world involve pairs of large cities in close proximity that rely on air transport due to a lack of high-speed rail, and the distance is large enough to discourage car driving. Several of the airports are on islands without road connection to the mainland.

== See also ==
- World's busiest passenger air routes
