= Legacy carrier =

US airline that was federally regulated before 1979

Contemporary legacy carriers of the United States

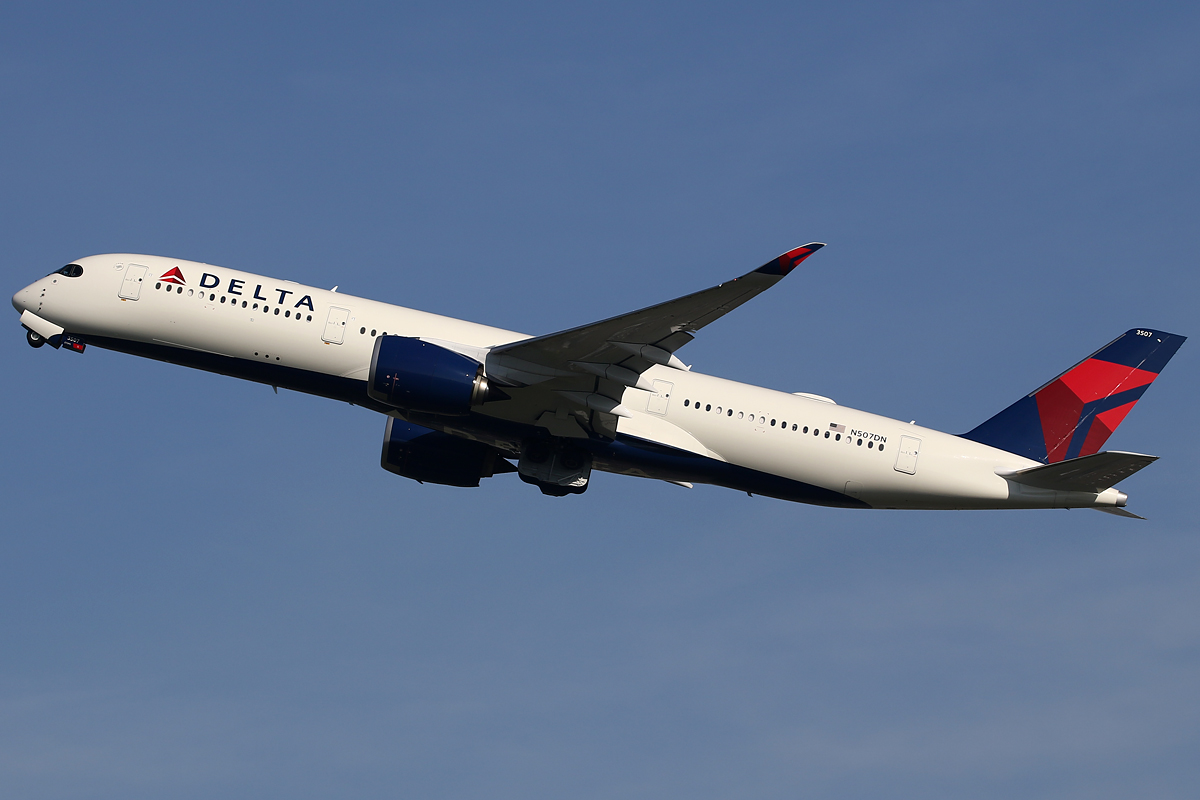
Delta Air Lines

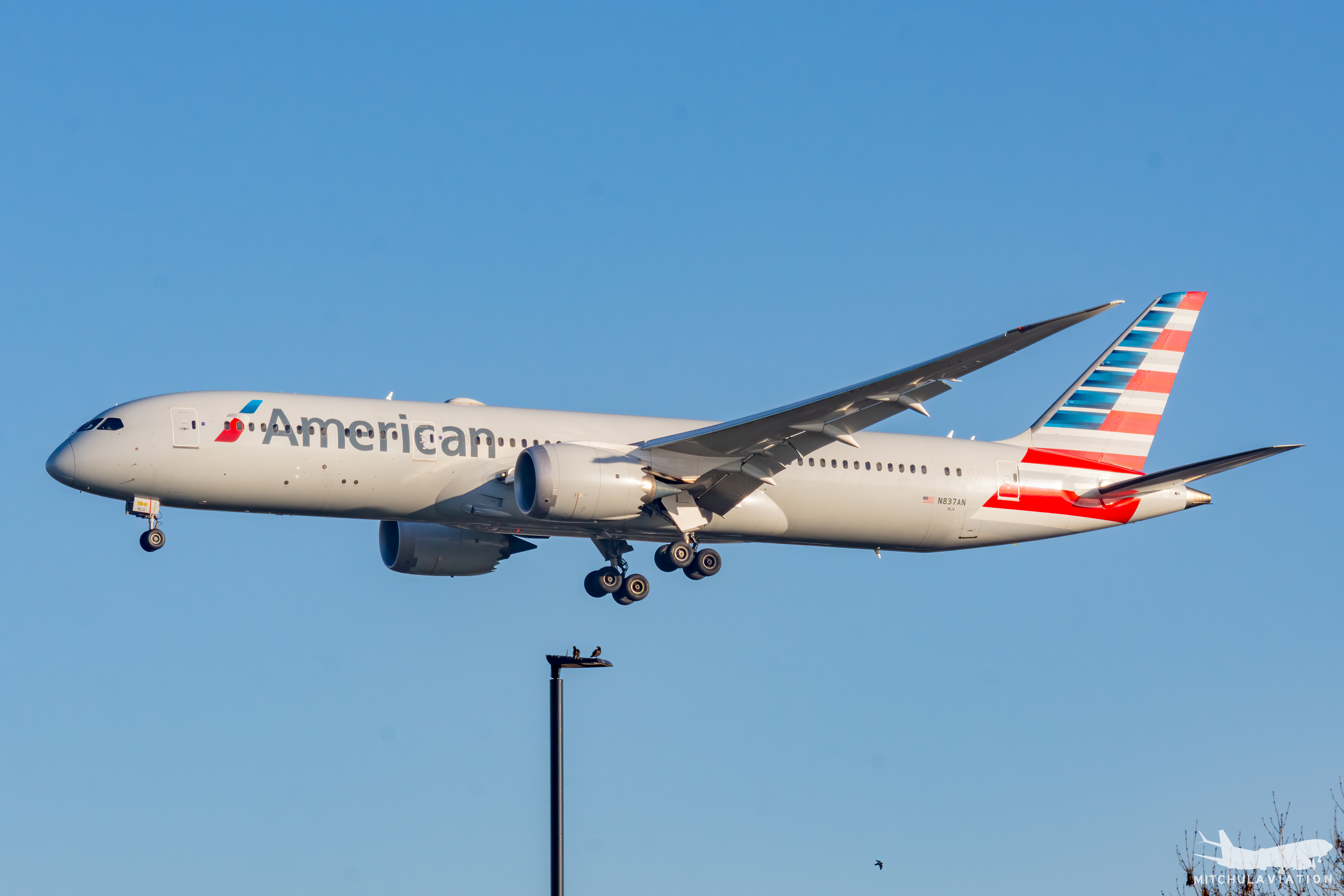
American Airlines

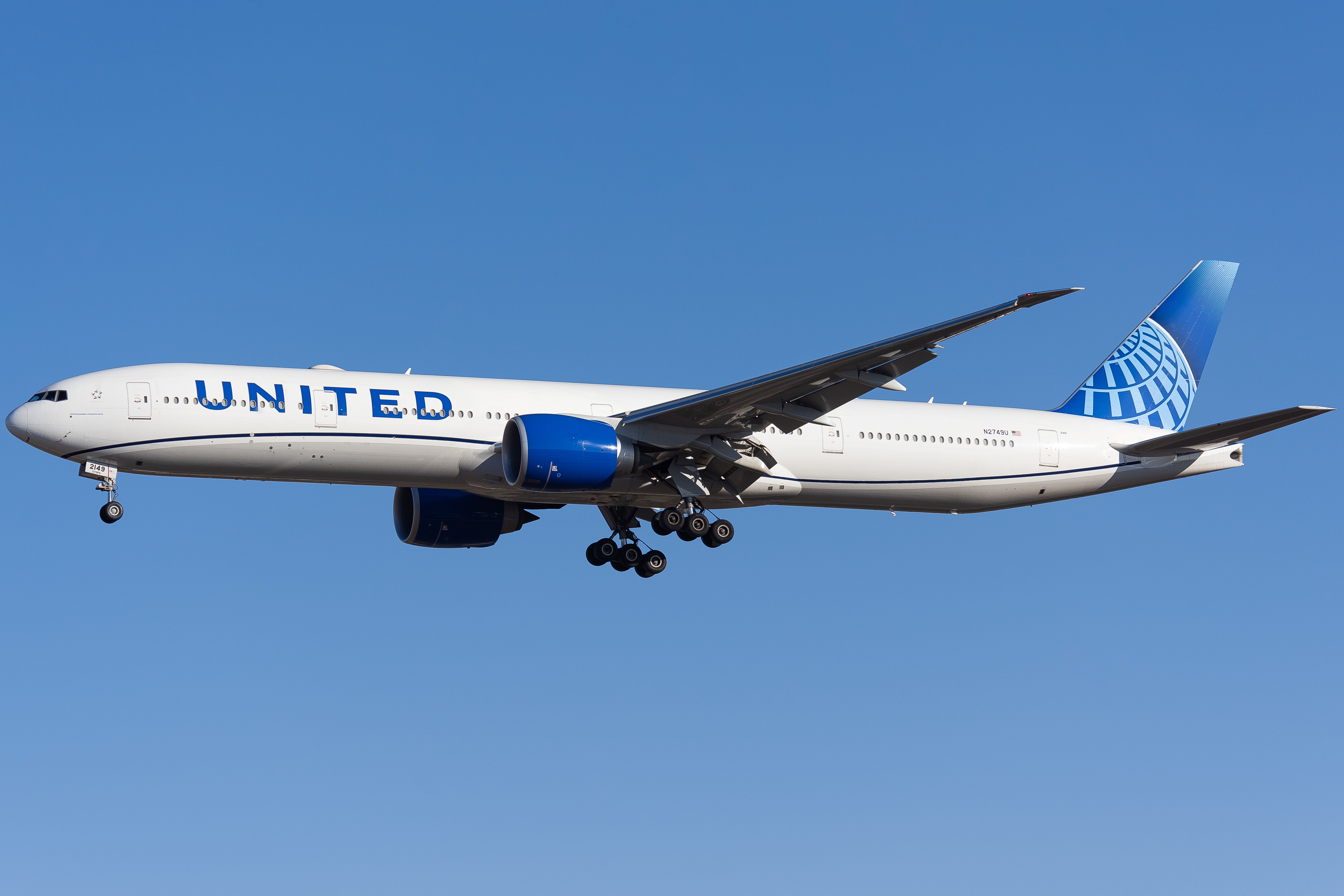
United Airlines

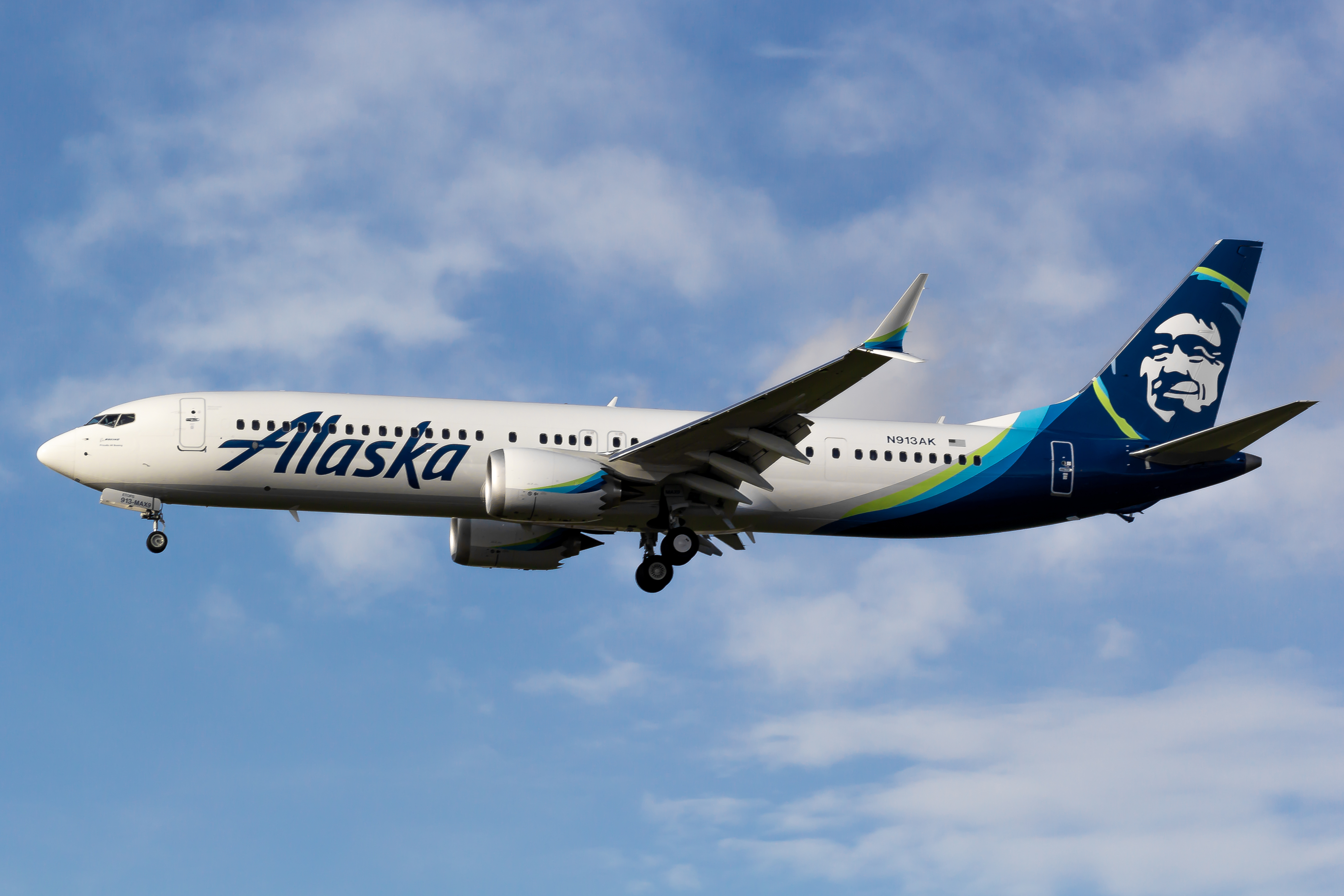
Alaska Airlines

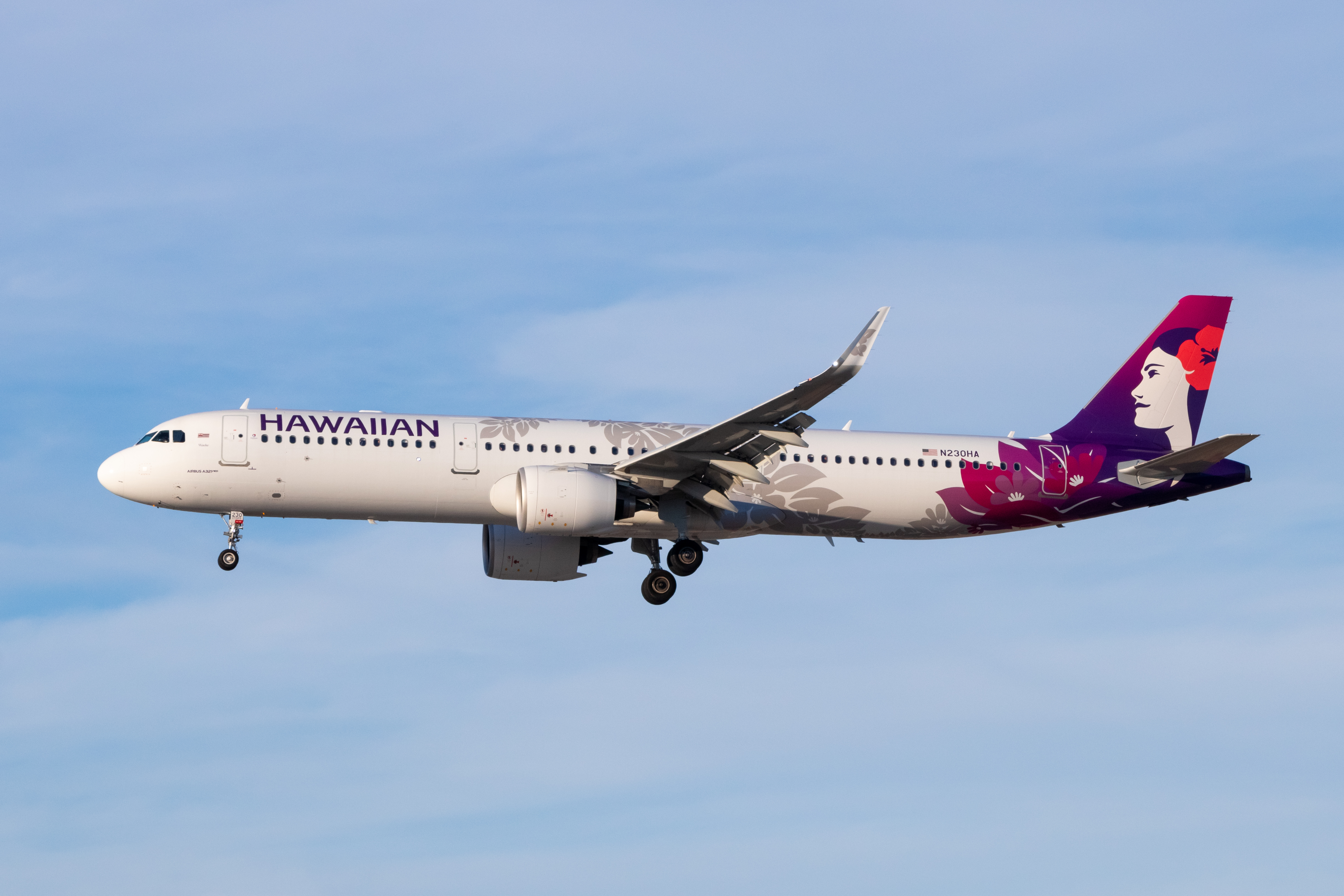
Hawaiian Airlines

In the United States, a legacy carrier is an airline that was once economically regulated by the now defunct Civil Aeronautics Board (CAB) during the period of airline regulation 1938–1978 or can trace its origin to one that did. The CAB was a federal agency that tightly controlled almost all US commercial air transport during that period. As related below, many features associated with the legacy airline business model were actually developed not during the regulated era, but instead in the first decade or so of the deregulated era following it, as legacy carriers adapted to an unfamiliar competitive environment.

While the term "legacy carrier" is most often used in a US context, it is possible to speak of legacy carriers elsewhere, since tight airline regulation was once the global norm and following US airline deregulation, many other countries went through some kind of airline deregulation. Non-US carriers with origins that precede liberalization can be viewed as legacy carriers. For instance, in Europe, flag carriers such as British Airways, Air France, KLM, Iberia, and Lufthansa, (with origins well before the liberalized era) can be viewed as legacy carriers in contrast to airlines such as Ryanair, EasyJet and Wizz Air.

== Surviving legacy carriers ==
There are currently four surviving legacy carriers, with Alaska Airlines and Hawaiian Airlines having completed their merger on September 18, 2024:

- Alaska Airlines/Hawaiian Airlines
- American Airlines
- Delta Air Lines
- United Airlines

Each of the above was founded by 1932 (94 years ago), although typically under a different name than they are currently known under.

Legacy carriers do not include:

- Any airline founded after the regulated era. A few prominent examples include America West Airlines, ValuJet, Virgin America, JetBlue, and Spirit Airlines.
- Any US airline with a pre-1979 origin that was not regulated by the CAB. In the US, there are two such US airlines still in operation: Southwest Airlines, which started operations in 1971 but was never subject to CAB regulation because it was an intrastate airline and thus was subject to less regulation; and SkyWest Airlines, founded in 1972 as a commuter carrier, thus not being subject to CAB regulation. As explained below, the term "intrastate airline" meant more than simply operating within a single state. For example, Hawaiian Airlines operated only within the state of Hawaii prior to 1981, yet was CAB-regulated.

== Significance ==
Prior to 1979, the CAB regulated its carriers as a cartel, strictly limiting competition between them and setting uniform fare levels nationally. Such fare levels were above those that would prevail in a free market, as proven by comparison with fares charged by less-regulated intrastate carriers during the regulated era. CAB carriers thus entered deregulation with a legacy of high costs. The history of the legacy carriers following deregulation is in significant part the story of their struggle with this legacy, their efforts to cut costs and to compensate for such costs through various business model adaptations. One indication of this long-term struggle is that of the surviving US legacy carriers, all have gone through bankruptcy since 1978 with the exception of Alaska Airlines.

== Context ==
A complete list of CAB-regulated scheduled airlines in 1978, the last year of the regulated era, is available in the Civil Aeronautics Board article. Those are the legacy carriers as of the start of the deregulated era. For completeness, there is also a list of charter carriers (the CAB called them supplemental air carriers) and all-cargo carriers (such as Flying Tiger Lines) from the same year. Whether CAB-era supplemental or all-cargo airlines count as legacy carriers is largely moot since none survive and they had little impact on the passenger industry after deregulation.

Of the 1978 scheduled passenger CAB carriers, as shown in the table referenced above, 23 flew jets:

- Ten domestic trunk carriers (American, Braniff, Continental, Delta, Eastern, National, Northwest, TWA, United, Western) plus Pan Am
- Eight local service carriers (Allegheny, Frontier, Hughes Airwest, North Central, Ozark, Piedmont, Southern, Texas International)
- The two Hawaiian carriers: Hawaiian and Aloha
- Two of the Alaskan carriers: Alaska and Wien Air Alaska

=== Airlines not regulated by the CAB ===
During the 1938–1978 regulated era, intrastate airlines were those that minimized participation in interstate commerce, most obviously by operating only within a single state, but also by measures such as not selling joint tickets with other carriers for itineraries that crossed state lines, not selling tickets in other states and so forth. By doing so, they sidestepped regulation by the CAB and were able to be economically regulated instead by an agency of their state, most of which were more flexible than the CAB. However, despite not flying outside of Hawaii, Hawaiian Airlines and Aloha Airlines were CAB-regulated carriers during this era, and participated in the interstate airline system by, for instance, selling connecting tickets to elsewhere in the US. For many reasons, neither airline was an intrastate carrier. For instance, it was determined in the courts that an intrastate carrier was essentially legally impossible in Hawaii. Federally-controlled waters start three miles offshore, which made most flights between islands subject to federal regulation.

Southwest started operations in 1971 and from 1971 thru 1978 was a Texas intrastate carrier, escaping CAB regulation. It was, in a sense, a carrier that was deregulated even before deregulation. Other important intrastate carriers included Pacific Southwest Airlines, Air California (later AirCal) and Air Florida, none of which survived the 1980s.

While the CAB was legally unable to regulate intrastate carriers, from 1952, it chose not to regulate airlines flying "small" aircraft, leading to the growth of a deregulated air taxi or commuter airline segment decades before wider deregulation. Any US airline that was a commuter carrier before 1979 therefore also escaped CAB regulation.

A prominent example of a CAB-era commuter carrier survives today: the large regional airline SkyWest, which first started operating in 1972 as a commuter carrier.

One CAB-era commuter airline made a post-deregulation impact at a mainline level and merged into a legacy carrier: Empire Airlines started in the mid-1970s as a commuter airline in Upstate New York, was certificated in 1979 and transitioned to jets shortly thereafter. It merged into Piedmont in 1986.

=== Legacy carrier post-deregulation adaptation ===
1979–1991 was a highly turbulent time for legacy airlines – during this time 13 of the original 23 passenger jet legacy carriers exited through merger and collapse as they struggled in the new environment. During this period, many legacy airline features developed as an adaptation to deregulation. Legacy carrier strategies included:

- Mergers: By the end of the 1980s, two of the 10 former trunk carriers had merged out of existence (National into Pan Am and Western into Delta) as had seven of the eight former local service carriers: Frontier and Texas International into Continental; Hughes, North Central and Southern into Republic which merged into Northwest; Ozark merged into TWA; and Piedmont into USAir. Some of these mergers were motivated by desires to reduce competition and were judged anticompetitive by the US government before nonetheless being approved by the US Department of Transportation.
- Expansion: All other things being equal, airline expansion drives down average costs by reducing average employee seniority (as new employees are hired), so average employee pay drops. An example of successful post-deregulation expansion was Piedmont, which expanded up and down the East Coast and was profitable every year after deregulation until it merged into USAir. The rapid expansion of Braniff, on the other hand, led to its collapse in 1982, the first legacy jet carrier to cease operation (the first former CAB carrier overall to cease operation was turboprop airline Air New England in 1981).
- Use of bankruptcy law to abrogate labor agreements and impose lower market wages as pursued by Continental Airlines in its 1983 bankruptcy.
- Lower pay scales for new hires (retaining higher pay scales for legacy employees), as pioneered by American Airlines in 1983.
- Loyalty programs: Frequent-flyer programs as we know them did not exist prior to the introduction of the American Advantage frequent-flyer club by American Airlines in 1981. This allowed legacy carriers to leverage their greater size.
- Development of complex fare structures overseen by revenue management programs, including reliance on price discrimination (selling the same seat for much more to a price-insensitive business traveler, and much less to price-sensitive personal travelers through mechanisms such as an advanced nonrefundable purchase, a required round-trip purchase with a Saturday-night stay to obtain the lowest prices) - again, led by American in 1985.
- Hub-and-spoke systems: Delta had a well-developed Atlanta hub prior to 1979, and the advantages of hubs were understood by many, but most airlines did not have the opportunity to develop hub-and-spoke systems prior to deregulation in 1979 because they could only fly where the CAB let them. Thus hubs were, for the most part, a post-deregulation development.
- International expansion: Pre-deregulation the domestic trunk airlines were largely that – mostly domestically focused. Legacy carriers made a concerted effort to expand internationally, since such flights were important to business travelers and less subject to low-cost competition. United bought Pan Am's Pacific routes, American bought Eastern's Latin American routes (previously those of Braniff before it collapsed), Delta bought Pan Am's European routes and so forth.
- Alignment of commuter airlines (later called regional airlines) with legacy carriers. Allegheny pioneered this in the 1960s in the CAB era, developing the Allegheny Commuter system of commuter carriers under common branding and liveries. For Allegheny it was in part a way to cease operating smaller routes itself. In the mid-1980s, the government permitted legacy carriers to code-share with commuters. This resulted in the quick alignment of commuters with legacy carriers as it became difficult for independent commuter carriers to survive, with commuters taking on the identity of the legacies with whom they were aligned. Some carriers, like American and Continental, bought some of the commuters with which they aligned.

Eastern and Pan Am proved unable to adapt, each collapsing in 1991. Including the earlier shutdowns of Braniff in 1982 (see above) and Wien Air Alaska in 1984, by 1991, four former CAB jet passenger airlines ceased operating. Added to the nine legacy jet carriers that merged and 13 of the 23 CAB legacy jet passenger airlines exited by 1991, leaving only 10 left, of which three were small (Alaska, Aloha and Hawaiian):

- Alaska Airlines
- Aloha Airlines
- American Airlines
- Continental Airlines
- Delta Air Lines
- Hawaiian Airlines
- Northwest Airlines
- TWA
- United Airlines
- USAir

=== From ten in 1991 to four today ===
- In 2001, bankrupt TWA merged into American Airlines.
- In 2005, bankrupt US Airways was bought by America West Airlines, which adopted the name of the larger carrier. The resulting carrier was considered a legacy airline, given its heritage was a majority legacy carrier.
- In 2008, Aloha Airlines collapsed.
- In 2008, Northwest Airlines agreed to merge with Delta Air Lines.
- In 2010, Continental Airlines agreed to merge with United Airlines.
- In 2013, US Airways and bankrupt American Airlines agreed to a 'stock swap' merger, with AMR stakeholders getting a majority of the combined shares. The combined airline adopted the American Airlines name and headquarters.
- In 2023, Hawaiian Airlines agreed to merge with Alaska Airlines, and their parent company, Alaska Air Group, retained both brands after the completion of the merger.

== See also ==
- List of airline mergers and acquisitions
- List of defunct airlines of the United States
- Low-cost carrier
- Major airlines of the United States
