= Oliver Parks =

American aviation pioneer

Oliver Lafayette Parks
- Born: June 10, 1899
- Died: February 28, 1985 (aged 85)
- Known for: Development of formal pilot training Parks Air College; World War II US military pilot training Ercoupe marketing Parks Air Lines

Oliver Lafayette "Lafe" Parks (June 10, 1899 – February 28, 1985) was an early aviator best known for his pioneering work in the fields of pilot training and aviation, including playing a major role in US military pilot training in World War II. His aviation activities also included aircraft manufacturing and sales, airport ownership and operation and airline ownership and operation.

In 1946–1950, Parks played a prominent role in the US airline industry. Through his airline, Parks Air Lines, he controlled a portfolio of route authorities viewed as potentially making his company one of the most significant carriers of its kind. But due to an unacceptable delay in starting operations, those rights were revoked by the same regulators who had granted them. Parks managed to start operations on a single route shortly before losing the rights. Parks Air Lines was then sold to Ozark Air Lines in exchange for stock in Ozark. Since Ozark had no airline operations, Parks Air Lines essentially became Ozark, just with a new name and management.

== Career ==
=== Pilot training ===
Parks' career started as a Chevrolet salesman at the Gravois Motor corporation in St. Louis. He started taking flying lessons in 1925 and obtained his pilot's license in January 1926. Combining his sales and piloting skills, Parks flew a Standard J with the Gravois Motor logo painted on the fuselage and wings.

A friend of Charles Lindbergh, Parks founded the Parks Air College at Lambert Field, St. Louis, in 1927 to provide the training that student pilots required to complete to earn their commercial pilot's certification. Parks Air College was America's first federally certified school of aviation, holding Civil Aeronautics Agency Air Agency Certificate no. 1. Oliver Parks was the sole flight instructor, with two trainer aircraft at Lambert Airfield. The venture nearly ended when Parks crashed a Laird Swallow on September 25 of that year, leaving only one trainer and no instructor while he recovered. His passengers, a young couple, sustained only minor injuries, but Park suffered a broken back, leg and jaw and lost an eye. He bought 100 acres about three miles south of East St. Louis in 1928 and built five buildings the same year for the school's new location. In the January 1931 issue of Aero Digest, Parks Air College advertised itself as the "World's Largest Commercial Flying School".

Parks engaged in some aircraft manufacturing through Parks Air College (see below). The College (including manufacturing) was rolled into Detroit Aircraft Corporation; Parks later bought back the training operation.

In the late 1930s, with war brewing again in Europe, Parks convinced the United States Army Air Corps that the training program at his college could adequately prepare military pilots for combat missions. In October 1938, General Hap Arnold asked three top aviation school representatives—Parks, C. C. Moseley of the Curtiss-Wright Technical Institute, and Theopholis Lee of the Boeing School of Aeronautics—to establish Civilian Pilot Training Program schools at their own risk, as Arnold could not promise funding; all three agreed. In the event of war, Arnold intended to extend Air Force training capacity by relying on civilian schools for primary (i.e. the most basic) training. In May 1939, Parks Air College and eight other aviation schools were notified to begin training. That same year, Parks was sent to Alabama to set up a Civilian Pilot Training Program for the University of Alabama at Van de Graaff Field. In 1940, he leased all of Curtiss-Steinberg Airport (now St. Louis Downtown Airport) in Cahokia, Illinois, which was renamed Curtiss-Parks Airport, for his school. By the end of World War II, more than 37,000 cadets (more than 10% of the Air Corps cadets who entered primary training and "fully one-sixth of all U.S. Army pilots of the era") had received their primary flight instruction at a Parks school.

In 1946, having concluded that future aviation leaders would need a broader, more academic education and also out of gratitude for the aid given him by Jesuit priests after a 1927 crash, Parks gave the college named after him to Saint Louis University, a Jesuit institution located across the Mississippi River from Parks's Cahokia, Illinois, campus. Parks Air College became the Parks College of Engineering, Aviation and Technology of Saint Louis University.

=== Aircraft manufacturing and sales ===
In conjunction with Parks Air College, around 1929 Parks engaged in aircraft manufacturing, known for the Parks P-1 and Parks P-2 biplanes, though this was never a very large business. These operations were folded into those of Detroit Aircraft Corporation. After bankruptcy, the heavier-than-air aircraft manufacturing activities of Detroit Aircraft Corporation were consolidated into Lockheed Aircraft.

In 1944, Parks conducted a nationwide survey to see what features the potential pool of 70,000 new post-war pilots would want in a personal aircraft. When the wartime training program was phased out that year, he went to work for the Engineering and Research Corporation (ERCO). He came up with the novel idea to sell the ERCO Ercoupe monoplane in department stores, signing up Marshall Field & Company in June 1945, followed by Macy's, Bamberger's and other stores in the Midwest. He himself became the Midwest distributor for eight states. Initial sales were encouraging, but the postwar light-aircraft boom did not last, and the Ercoupe was not a commercial success.

=== Airports ===
After the war, Parks restructured his network of training schools into a company called Parks Aircraft Sales and Service (PASS), which operated fixed base operators and airports. In 1946, PASS bought Curtis-Steinberg Airport in Cahokia for $400,000 and renamed it Parks Metropolitan Airport. The airport was a significant financial burden. In 1950, Parks said it had lost $70,000 in each of the prior three years and, if the City of St. Louis was not willing to purchase it (for a reliever airport), he would need to subdivide it. In 1950 Parks resigned as president of PASS. He disposed of his stock to stay in compliance with the CAB to avoid a conflict of interest with his shareholdings in Ozark Air Lines (see below). The largest remaining shareholder was St. Louis University. PASS tried to sell the airport to St. Louis as a reliever airport, given the facility's proximity to the city.

In 1959, with the airport experiencing financial difficulties, the facility closed and developers started to create a residential community on the property. However, only about 200 of the 2500 homes in the "St Louis Gardens" subdivision were built. The need for a secondary airport to take pressure off the overcrowded Lambert Field resulted in the property being purchased by the Bi-State Development Agency in 1965 and converted back into an airport. Parks returned as airport manager for two years at annual salary of $1.

=== Airline ===
In 1944, Parks founded Parks Air Transport (PAT), through which he applied to the Civil Aeronautics Board (CAB), the federal agency that at the time had tight control over almost all US air transport, for certification as a feeder or local service airline. In 1946 and 1947, the CAB awarded PAT the largest route network of any such applicant in significant part based on Parks's reputation. The routes were characterized as potentially the "richest" such feeder network.

However, Parks repeatedly delayed starting operation, saying he was unable to raise financing. In June 1949 the CAB started proceedings to potentially revoke the certification of the airline, by then renamed Parks Air Lines. In June 1950, shortly before the CAB gave its final ruling, PAL started service on a route from Parks Metropolitan Airport to Chicago, via St Louis and three central Illinois cities. The CAB revoked PAL's certification, and a federal appeals court declined to stop the CAB from enforcing the order pending a full appeal.

In September Parks agreed to merge PAL into Ozark Air Lines, which at the time had no airline operation, but which had been awarded most of the PAL rights as a replacement carrier by the CAB. PAL's operation therefore became that of Ozark.

== Honors ==
In addition to the Parks College of Engineering, Aviation and Technology, Oliver Parks Middle School in Cahokia Unit School District 187 is also named after him.
