= List of airline mergers and acquisitions =

This article lists airline mergers and acquisitions, with a brief history of each:

Air India

- 2007 - Merged with Indian Airlines. Kept Air India name.
- 2022 - Acquires Vistara

Air Berlin

- 2006 - Acquired dba
- 2007 - Acquired LTU International
- 2009 - Acquired LGW
- 2009 - Acquired Belair
- 2011 - Acquired flyNiki
- 2017 - Filed for insolvency

Air New Zealand

- 1978 - Merged with NAC
- 2000 - Acquired Ansett Australia, Ansett collapsed, proving to be more of a drain than asset.

Air Canada

- 2000 - Acquired Canadian Airlines

Air France

- 1990 - Acquired Air Inter, fully absorbing it into Air France in April 1997
- 2004 - Merged with KLM Royal Dutch Airlines, changing the company name to Air France-KLM, although the two airlines still operate as separate airlines.

Air Jamaica

- 2010 - Acquired by Caribbean Airlines

Avianca

- 1919 - Begins as SCADTA
- 1940 - Merged with SACO, retains Avianca name
- 1994 - Merged with SAM and Helicol
- 2003 - Acquired ACES Colombia' routes
- 2003 - Acquired OceanAir and VIP Ecuador
- 2008 - Acquired Tampa Cargo
- 2009 - Merged with TACA Airlines
- 2009 - Acquired AeroGal
- 2014 - Acquired AeroUnion, which continues to operate as a separate airline

Aurora

- 2013 - Formed by merger of Aeroflot subsidiaries SAT Airlines and Vladivostok Air

Austrian Airlines

- 1957 - Air Austria and Austrian Airways form Austrian Airlines
- 2002 - Merged Rheintalflug and Tyrolean Airways to Austrian Arrows
- 2013 - Merged with Lauda Air kept name

British Airways and Iberia

- 2010 - International Airlines Group (IAG) was formed by the merger of two airlines. Both carriers continued to operate under separate brand.
  - As IAG
    - 2011 - Acquired British Midland International
    - 2012 - Acquired Vueling
    - 2015 - Acquired Aer Lingus
    - 2022 - Acquired 20% of Air Europa

Bulgaria Air

- 2010 - Merged with Hemus Air kept the name Bulgaria Air

Canadian Airlines

- 1987 - Formed by merger of Canadian Pacific Airlines, Eastern Provincial Airways, Nordair, and Pacific Western Airlines
- 1989 - Acquired Wardair
- 2001 - Canadian Airlines acquired by Air Canada

Canadian North

- 2019 - Acquired by First Air. Acquired the First Air brand kept the Canadian North name.

Caribbean Airlines

- 2010 - Acquired Air Jamaica

Cathay Pacific

- 2006 - Acquired full ownership over Dragonair (rebranded to Cathay Dragon in 2016), which continued to operate as a separate airline until 2020, when it was folded into Cathay Pacific
- 2020 - Acquired Hong Kong Express

Cimber Air

- 2008 - Acquired bankrupt Sterling Airlines to form Cimber Sterling.

Etihad Airways

- 2011 to 2021 - Attempted to create its own airline alliance, Etihad Airways Partners, through acquisition of minority stakes in several airlines: Air Berlin (29.21%, 2011) (filed bankruptcy, 2017), Air Seychelles (40%, 2012) (divested, 2021), Aer Lingus (2.987%, 2012), Virgin Australia (10%, 2012), Jat Airways (rebranded Air Serbia) (49%, 2013) (reduced to 18%, 2020), Jet Airways (24%, 2013) (filed bankruptcy, 2019), Darwin Airline (33.3%, 2013) (divested, 2017), Alitalia (49%, 2014) (filed bankruptcy, 2017), flyNiKi (49%, 2016) (filed bankruptcy, 2017)

First Air

- 2019 - Acquired Canadian North. Kept the First Air brand acquired the Canadian North name.

KLM Royal Dutch Airlines

- 2004 - Acquired by Air France, which changed its company name to Air France-KLM, although the two airlines still operate as separate airlines

Loftleidir-Icelandic

- 1979 - Flugfélag Íslands and Loftleiðir merged, and the airline became known as Icelandair.

LOT Polish Airlines

- 1929 - Aero and Aerolot merged to form LOT Polish Airlines

LAN Airlines

- 1995 - Purchased Ladeco
- 2012 - Merged with TAM Linhas Aéreas to form LATAM Airlines Group

Lufthansa

- 1955 - Created Deutsche Flugdienst GmbH in conjunction with other companies and subsequently owned 25.81% of it
- 1959 - Increased its shares in Deutsche Flugdienst to 95.5%. In 1961 Deutsche Flugdienst bought "Condor-Luftreederei“ renaming itself then "Condor Flugdienst GmbH"
- 1989 - Created SunExpress Airlines as a joint venture with Turkish Airlines
- 1995 - Transferred SunExpress shares over to Condor
- 1999 - Purchased 26% of Air Dolomiti
- 2003 - upped its stake to 51.9% (April) and then 100% (November) of Air Dolomiti
- 2006 - Lufthansa sold its remaining 50% stake in Condor to KarstadtQuelle AG
- 2007 - In conjunction with the sale of Condor, LH took back its shares of SunExpress
- 2005-2007 - Purchased Swiss Int'l Airlines
- 2008 - Purchased Austrian Airlines
- 2008 - Purchased BMI (Sold in 2011 to IAG (British Airways))
- 2008 - Acquired 45% of Brussels Airlines
- 2008 - Purchased 19% of Jetblue
- 2009 - Acquired 100% of Germanwings
- 2016 - Acquired remaining 55% of Brussels Airlines
- 2017 - Acquired Air Berlin
- 2023 - Agreement to purchase 41% of ITA Airways (successor of Alitalia)

Rossiya Airlines

- 2006 - Increases by merger with Pulkovo Aviation Enterprise
- 2016 - Increases by merger with Donavia and Orenair and re-brands

S7 Airlines (Siberia Airlines)

- 2001 - Acquired Vnukovo Airlines and Baikal Airlines
- 2004 - Acquired Enkor
- 2005 - Re-brands from Siberia Airlines to S7 Airlines and makes Moscow-Domodedovo as the main hub
- 2008 - Acquired Perm Airlines

TAM Linhas Aéreas

- 1996 - Acquired Helisul Linhas Aéreas
- 1996 - Acquired LAPSA
- 1998 - Acquired Itapemirim Transportes Aéreos
- 2012 - Merged with LAN Airlines to form LATAM Airlines Group

Vistara

- 2024 - Merged into Air India

United States

- AirTran Airways
  - 1997 - Bought by the holding company for ValuJet Airlines, the holding company merged their ValuJet airline into AirTran thus keeping the AirTran name
  - 2011 - Bought by Southwest Airlines, AirTran fleet transferred to Southwest and thereby AirTran becomes an inactive subsidiary
- Alaska Airlines
  - 1986 - Acquired Jet America Airlines
  - 1986 - Acquired Horizon Air, which continues to operate as a separate airline
  - 2018 - Acquired Virgin America. The merger made Alaska a dominant U.S. carrier in the West Coast.
  - 2024 - Acquired Hawaiian Airlines, both airlines will continue to operate as separate brands
- America West Airlines
  - 2005 - Acquired US Airways
- American Airlines
  - 1971 - Acquired Trans Caribbean Airways
  - 1987 - Acquired Air California
  - 1990 - Acquired the Eastern Air Lines' route network from Miami to Latin America and the Caribbean
  - 1997 - Acquired Reno Air
  - 2001 - Acquires most of Trans World Airlines assets after filing for bankruptcy
  - 2013 - Acquired by US Airways, keeping the American Airlines name. Currently the world's largest carrier.
  - 2019 - Purchased a 3% stake in China Southern Airlines
- Braniff International Airways
  - 1982 - South American routes was purchased by Eastern Air Lines
- Continental Airlines
  - 1934 - Begins as Varney Speed Lines
  - 1982 - Acquired Texas International Airlines
  - 1987 - Acquired People Express, Frontier, and New York Air
  - 1987 - Acquired PBA and Britt Airways from People Express merger / created Continental Express
  - 2010 - Merged into United Airlines, under the United name and the Continental brand
- Delta Air Lines
  - 1924 - Started as Huff Daland Dusters
  - 1928 - Huff Daland Dusters was purchased by C.E. Woolman and renamed Delta Air Service after the Mississippi Delta
  - 1953 - Purchased the Chicago and Southern Air Lines, and flew under the name Delta C&S for the next two years until the summer of 1955
  - 1972 - Purchased Northeast Airlines after Northeast was experiencing financial problems
  - 1984 - Established the Delta Connection (ASA, Comair, Skywest, ...)
  - 1987 - Merged with Western Airlines, at the time the oldest continuously operating airline in the United States
  - 1991 - Purchase of Pan Am's European routes, and acquired Pan Am's shuttle, forming what is today Delta Shuttle
  - 1996 - Delta Express began service, ended November 2003
  - 2003 - Song began service, ended May 2006
  - 2008 - Merged with Northwest Airlines, was world's largest carrier at time of merger, keeping the Delta Air Lines brand and name.
  - 2017 - Bought 10% of Air France–KLM
  - 2017 - Bought 32% of Aeromexico to total a stake of 49% ownership
  - 2020 - Bought 20% of LATAM Airlines Group
- Eastern Air Lines
  - 1956 - Merged with Colonial Airlines
  - 1967 - Merged with Mackey Airlines
  - 1986 - Purchased by Texas International, but continues to operate separately as Eastern Airlines
  - 1990 - American Airlines purchased Eastern's routes from Miami to Latin America and the Caribbean
- Florida Airlines
  - 1975 - Air South and Shawnee Airlines are purchased by Florida Airlines
- Frontier Airlines
  - 2007 - Entered service agreement with Republic Airways
  - 2008 - Declared bankruptcy, then purchased by Republic
  - 2009 - Still under the Frontier name, Republic mandates a merger between Frontier and Midwest Airlines
  - 2013 - Enter a contract with Indigo, beginning a transition into an ULCC
- Hawaiian Airlines
  - 2024 - Acquired by Alaska Air Group
- Hughes Airwest
  - 1968 - Pacific Air Lines (originally Southwest Airways), Bonanza Air Lines, and West Coast Airlines merged to form Air West
  - 1970 - Howard Hughes purchased Air West and renamed it Hughes Airwest
  - 1980 - Merged into Republic Airlines
- JetBlue and Spirit Airlines
  - 2022 to 2024 - JetBlue's attempted acquisition of Spirit blocked by a federal court
  - 2026 - (Spirit Airlines) - ceased operations and filed for chapter 7 liquidation
- National Airlines
  - 1979 - Merged with Pan Am
- Northeast Airlines
  - 1972 - Merged into Delta Air Lines
- Northwest Airlines
  - 1916 - Founded by Col. Lewis Patenaude, under the name Northwest Airways
  - 1927 - Began flying passengers
  - 1949 - With its new routes to the far east, re-branded itself as Northwest Orient Airlines
  - 1986 - Purchased Republic Airlines, and dropped the word Orient from its brand name
  - 1993 - Began transatlantic partnership with KLM Royal Dutch Airlines, dubbed as "Wings Alliance"
  - 2008 - Merged into Delta Air Lines. Became world's largest airline by passenger traffic in 2008 under the Delta name.
- Ozark Airlines
  - 1943 - Ozark Air Lines is founded, then ceases operations in late 1940s
  - 1944 - Parks Air Transport (Parks Air Lines) is founded
  - 1950 - Ozark Air Lines resumes operations
  - 1950 - Purchased Parks Air Transport (Parks Air Lines)
  - 1986 - Merged into Trans World Airlines
- Pan Am
  - 1928 - Merged with Aviation Corporation of the Americas/American International Airways
  - 1928 - Founded and formed by the merger of Atlantic, Gulf, and Caribbean Airways
  - 1929 - Acquired majority of Mexicana de Aviación
  - 1950 - Merged with American Overseas Airlines
  - 1979 - Merged with National Airlines
  - 1985 - United Airlines purchased Pan Am's entire Pacific Division
  - 1990 - United Airlines purchased Pan Am routes to London Heathrow Airport
  - 1991 - United Airlines purchased Pan Am's entire Latin American Division
  - 1991 - Delta Air Lines purchased Pan Am's European routes, and acquired Pan Am's Shuttle
  - 1991 to present - Following 1991 bankruptcy, trademarks sold to unaffiliated companies; Pan Am Flight Academy acquired by All Nippon Airways in 2014
- Republic Airlines (Republic Airlines 1979-1986)
  - 1979 - Founded and formed by the merger of North Central Airlines and Southern Airways
  - 1944 - Southern Airways is founded
  - 1944 - Wisconsin Central Airlines is founded
  - 1952 - Wisconsin Central Airlines changes name to North Central Airlines
  - 1980 - Acquired Hughes Airwest
  - 1986 - Merged into Northwest Orient to form Northwest Airlines
- Republic Airways Holdings
  - 2005 - Acquired Shuttle America
  - 2009 - Acquired Midwest Airlines
  - 2009 - Acquired Frontier Airlines
- Southwest Airlines
  - 1985 - Acquired Muse Air
  - 1993 - Acquired Morris Air
  - 2008 - Acquired certain assets of bankrupt ATA Airlines
  - 2011 - Acquired AirTran Airways
- Trans World Airlines
  - 1925 - First incorporated as Western Air Express
  - 1927 - Maddux Air Lines is founded
  - 1927 - Standard Air Lines is founded
  - 1928 - Transcontinental Air Transport is founded
  - 1929 - Maddux Air Lines merges with Transcontinental Air Transport
  - 1930 - Standard Air Lines merges with Western Air Express
  - 1930 - Western Air Express merges with Transcontinental Air Transport, rebranded itself as Transcontinental & Western Air, T&WA, later changed name to Trans World Airlines, TWA
  - 1934 - Western Air Express broke off from Transcontinental & Western Air, T&WA and briefly changed its name to General Air Lines, returning to the name Western Air Express after several months
  - 1986 - Purchased Ozark Air Lines
  - 2001 - Merged into American Airlines
- United Airlines
  - 1926 - Founded as Varney Air Lines
  - 1931 - Purchased National Air Transport and Pacific Air Transport
  - 1961 - Merged with Capital Airlines
  - 1985 - Purchased Pan Am's entire Pacific Division
  - 1990 - Purchased Pan Am routes to London Heathrow Airport
  - 1991 - Purchased Pan Am's entire Latin American Division
  - 2010 - Merged with Continental Airlines. Was the world's largest carrier at the time of merger, acquired the Continental brand and kept the United name.
  - 2014 - Four years taking over Continental, United closed the hub at Cleveland Hopkins International Airport for the second time
- US Airways
  - 1938 - Started as All American Aviation Company, renamed All American Airlines and then Allegheny Airlines
  - 1957 - Changed name to Allegheny Airlines
  - 1968 - Purchased Lake Central Airlines
  - 1972 - Purchased Mohawk Airlines
  - 1979 - Changed name to USAir
  - 1988 - Purchased Pacific Southwest Airlines
  - 1989 - Purchased Piedmont Airlines
  - 1992 - Operates former Trump Shuttle for banks, renamed by banks as Shuttle, Inc, dba USAir Shuttle
  - 1997 - Changed name to US Airways
  - 1997 - Purchased former Trump Shuttle, now Shuttle, Inc from Banks, dba US Airways Shuttle
  - 1998 - Launches low-fare carrier MetroJet
  - 2000 - Merges US Airways Shuttle into US Airways
  - 2001 - Dissolves low-fare carrier MetroJet
  - 2005 - Acquired by America West Airlines, keeping the US Airways name
  - 2013 - Merged into American Airlines
- Virgin America
  - 2016 - Merged into Alaska Airlines. The merger made Alaska a dominant U.S. carrier in the West Coast.
- Western Airlines
  - 1925 - First incorporated as Western Air Express by Harris Hanshue
  - 1926 - Western's first flight took place
  - 1928 - Reincorporated as Western Air Express Corp.
  - 1930 - Purchased Standard Airlines (subsidiary of Aero Corp. of Ca. founded in 1926). WAE with Fokker aircraft merged with Transcontinental Air Transport T-A-T to form Transcontinental & Western Air T&WA.
  - 1934 - Western Air Express broke off from Transcontinental & Western Air T&WA and briefly changed its name to General Air Lines, returning to the name Western Air Express after several months
  - 1941 - Western Air Express changed its name to Western Air Lines, which was later altered to Western Airlines
  - 1967 - Merged with Pacific Northern Airlines
  - 1987 - Merged into Delta Air Lines

== See also ==
- List of airline holding companies - the actual enterprises and business entities which do the acquisitions and mergers.
