= Greater St. Louis Air & Space Museum =

- Established: July 1982
- Location: St. Louis Downtown Airport, Cahokia Heights, Illinois
- Coordinates: 38.5772°N 90.1653°W
- Website: http://www.airandspacemuseum.org

The Greater St. Louis Air & Space Museum is a museum with the mission to preserve and display historic air and space craft and artifacts, and provide educational programs.

== Architecture ==
The museum is housed in the Curtiss Wright Hangar number two at St. Louis Downtown Airport, Cahokia Heights, Illinois. The adjacent Hangar one and two are listed on the National Register of Historic Places.

The Hangar was completed in March 1930 on the newly opened Curtiss-Stienburg airport. The brick structure featured a cast Curtiss Wright emblem across the doorway. The first occupant of Hangar 2 was St. Louis based Union Electric Company. Its Ford 4-AT-B was used for corporate transport and line patrols, and is now part of the National Naval Aviation Museum. Later it was used for the East St. Louis Flying School. In 1939, Oliver Parks expanded his flight operations to the airport for the Civilian Pilot Training Program. Parks College used the hangar for flight operations until the mid-1990s.

== History ==
The Saint Louis Air & Space Museum was incorporated in July 1982. The original site for the museum was located at Spirit of St. Louis Airport. The museum moved to its current location in 2005 following a flood.

== Collection ==
- Schempp-Hirth Standard Austria
- Bede BD-5
- Link Trainer
- Lockheed JetStar
- Meyers OTW
- Mini-MAX

== See also ==
- List of aerospace museums
