= Parks Air Lines =

1950 predecessor to Ozark Air Lines

- Founded: August 1944 (as Parks Air Transport)
- Commenced operations: 23 June 1950
- Ceased operations: 25 September 1950
- Operating bases: East St. Louis
- Fleet size: 5
- Destinations: 6
- Headquarters: Cahokia, Illinois; United States
- Key people: Oliver Parks

Parks Air Lines routes certificated by the Civil Aeronautics Board

Parks Air Lines, named for its founder, Oliver Parks, was a US scheduled airline that initially appeared likely to be one of the most significant carriers of its kind, but in the end, operated only a single route for three months in 1950. In 1946 and 1947 the airline was certificated as a local service carrier (also known at that time as a "feeder airline") by the Civil Aeronautics Board (CAB), the now-defunct federal agency that, at the time, tightly regulated almost all US air transportation. The CAB awarded the airline, then known as Parks Air Transport, a substantial network of routes to mostly smaller cities mostly centered on St Louis. But after lengthy delays in initiating service, the CAB instituted proceedings to strip Parks of its network. Parks started service just in advance of the CAB's decision, but after a brief period of operation and some litigation, merged into Ozark Air Lines, the carrier to which the CAB gave most of Park's route authorities. This marked the start of Ozark's operations.

This was Oliver Parks's second use of the name "Parks Air Lines". He previously used it for his aviation activities prior to the Great Depression, including pilot training and aircraft manufacturing.

See External links for two rare photos of Parks Douglas DC-3s.

== History ==
=== Oliver Parks ===
Oliver L. Parks was a prominent early aviator, known for his Cahokia, IL-based pilot training school, Parks Air College (PAC), across the Mississippi River from St Louis. Parks started the school in 1927, the first such in the country, and Parks and his school played a key role in training military pilots for World War II.

=== Winning routes from the Civil Aeronautics Board ===
During World War II, Parks's pilot training expanded to four other locations. After the war Parks converted these other four training companies into fixed base operators (FBOs) that ran and owned various airports under the umbrella of Parks Aircraft Sales and Service (PASS). In August 1944, Parks incorporated Parks Air Transport (PAT) in Nevada to apply to the CAB for certification as a local service carrier. The CAB had created the category of local service (or “feeder”) airlines earlier in the year to bring air transport to previously unserved smaller cities and was seeking to certificate new carriers to fly such routes. PAT had authorized capital of $3.5mm, over $60mm in 2024 dollars. This sounded impressive, but actual available capital (as represented to the CAB) was $650,000 committed by PAC, PASS and the board members of PAT (including Parks).

PAT won routes in three CAB cases, most with a St Louis terminus, in Dec 1946 (North Central Case), September 1947 (Great Lakes Area Case) and December 1947 (Mississippi Valley Case). In February 1948, it added another route to Parks's Great Lakes certificate. (see nearby map). The resulting mileage of the routes awarded in these certifications was 50% larger than the next biggest feeder network and over eight times as large as the smallest. PAT was recognized as potentially the “richest feeder network in the U.S.”. The certifications were contingent on a sufficient number of airports on these routes upgrading (radios and other infrastructure) to federal standards required to accept commercial aircraft. In May 1948, the CAB issued Parks a certificate for part of its system, based on a sufficient number of airports being of required standard. In the same month, Parks Air Transport became Parks Air Lines (PAL).

In making these awards to PAT, the CAB cited Parks's extensive experience with PAC and aviation generally. They noted he had airline experience through PAC's long-standing student-run "airline" ("Parks Air College Airlines"), that ran like a real airline (other than carrying passengers) including dispatch, maintenance, operating real flights, etc., learning how to handle real operational issues. The CAB saw public benefit in PAT being able to connect passengers on routes from one of the cases onto routes from the other cases PAT won; in modern terms that PAT would have a hub at St Louis. They liked that Parks was well capitalized.

=== Failure to launch ===
PAL didn't have the money to start operations. The CAB later determined that of the $650,000 in capital that Parks represented to the CAB, the airline only drew on $81,000 (which, it noted, had been spent mainly on intangible items). In early 1948, Ozark, in appealing to the CAB to reverse the PAT route awards, noted "severe financial losses suffered by Parks and his affiliated companies during the past two years." PASS lost over $148,000 in 1948. Oliver Parks had notable drains on the resources of his enterprises during the period 1944 to 1950:

- In 1945 PASS purchased what is today known as St. Louis Downtown Airport in Cahokia (the airport for East St Louis) for $400,000. Parks named it Parks Metropolitan Airport. This was the war-time home of PAC. Parks then spent "a lot of money" rehabilitating it. By January 1950 Parks was trying to get St Louis buy it, saying if he couldn't sell it, he'd have to subdivide it because it lost $70,000 per year the previous three years.
- Parks was a high-profile participant in an unsuccessful attempt to mass market light aircraft. In November 1944, Parks predicted a market for 5 million “personal aircraft” through 1960. He was a prominent promoter and distributor of the Ercoupe, one such light aircraft. For instance, Parks had the idea to sell them through department stores and Ercoupe did for a time, including at Macy’s and J.C. Penney. In Spring 1946 ERCO manufactured over 30 Ercoupes a day, but by November, a glut forced the factory to suspend production and in 1947, ERCO exited the business. Some other light aircraft manufacturers went bankrupt. Parks pursued his Ercoupe activity through PASS.
- In 1946 he donated PAC to St. Louis University. PAC had nominal assets of $3mm, including a 113-acre campus (with its own small airfield), 22 buildings including dormitories, labs and so on.

PAL was unable to obtain funding, including from government-owned Reconstruction Finance Corporation which in January 1949 turned it down a loan (based on all of Parks's enterprises) for a $600,000 loan on the basis of insufficient collateral and weak prospective earnings. The delay in starting service hurt Parks's reputation. Editorials expressed anger for him retaining routes he'd been unable to operate, and politicians said they'd pass legislation to fix things if the CAB did not act.

=== Conflict with the CAB ===
In March 1949, the CAB ordered PAL to start operations by July 1, 1949. In April PAL announced its sale to Mid-Continent Airlines, a Kansas City trunk carrier, subject to CAB approval. With PAL still not in operation, on 28 June 1949, the CAB launched the Parks Investigation Case, consolidating all Parks issues before the CAB. The CAB took 13 months to come to a final decision, but since the case included taking applications for replacement service, the likely outcome was clear. A December 1949 news article noted there was "general disbelief that Parks itself will get another chance to operate."

In October 1949, Parks raised a $400,000 loan for PAL by pledging his other companies, providing a personal guarantee and securing a $130,000 investment from St Louis University. He said the total enabled him to start service across the network using single-engined four-passenger Cessna 190 aircraft (rather than Douglas DC-3s previously promised). The CAB's attorneys, in their case brief of January 1950, criticized Parks for not previously putting his own money at risk, failing to operate even a single route, questioned his desire to operate and management competence. It also dismissed single-engine aircraft operation as unsuitable. In April, the case examiner published preliminary findings, recommending PAL be decertificated and its routes split between three other airlines, two of them existing (Turner Air Lines, which was soon to become Lake Central Airlines and Mid-Continent), and one new, Ozark Air Lines. Ozark had been an unsuccessful applicant in the cases where PAL had won its certifications. A month later, Parks announced he'd acquired DC-3s and intended to start service in June. The CAB chairman wrote to dissuade Parks, saying such service would "not be in the public interest." Parks asserted the chairman's directive was a "suggestion" and the airline had every right to fly. PAL started service June 23 from St Louis to Chicago, via Decatur, Springfield and Champaign.

On August 1, 1950, the CAB announced PAL lost its certification, but PAL obtained a temporary stay of the ruling through Federal appeals court pending a hearing. The full board changed the outcome from that recommended by the examiner: Ozark was to get two of the three Parks certifications (which included the one route Parks was currently operating), with Mid-Continent getting the third. But on August 9, the appeals court said that while Parks was free to pursue a full appeal, the court would not, in the meantime, stop the CAB order from being implemented on schedule on September 26. Some Illinois cities supported PAL keeping the flights; now that PAL was operating, they were afraid that switching to Ozark would mean further delays, given that Ozark had no airline operations experience. Finally, on September 20, Ozark announced it would buy PAL, including five DC-3s, all its operations and equipment, for a 37.5% stake in Ozark. The CAB waived a review of the merger, saying it didn't want to stop the benefit the sale offered to the public. On September 25, Parks flew its last flight, and on September 26, the same operation flew under Ozark control.

== Legacy ==
Ozark's maintenance base continued to be at Parks Metropolitan Airport until January 1952, when it moved to St. Louis Lambert Airport. Ozark merged into Trans World Airlines (TWA) in October 1986, which merged into American Airlines in 2001.

Mid-Continent started flying over its portion of the former Parks routes on October 1, 1950. Mid-Continent merged with Braniff Airways in 1952, Braniff collapsed in 1982.

== Fleet ==
At the time PAL sold itself to Ozark, it had five DC-3s.

== Destinations ==
From August 1, 1950, Parks Air Lines timetable:

- Champaign, Illinois
- Chicago, Illinois
- Decatur, Illinois
- East St. Louis, Illinois
- St. Louis, Missouri
- Springfield, Illinois
