= Saturday-night stay =

Airfare pricing factor

Saturday-night stay is a rule used by airlines to separate business and leisure travelers.

For travelers to qualify for a low round-trip airfare, some legacy carriers require them to spend Saturday night at their destination. The rule is based on the airlines' assumption that business travelers are more likely than leisure travelers to spend Saturday night at home. For example, a business traveler may depart on a Sunday or Monday and then return home that Friday or Saturday.

Business travelers' demand for travel is less elastic and airlines attempt to increase their profits by price-discriminating business travelers and leisure travelers. Business travelers often do not pay for their tickets personally, and may also be more loyal to a particular airline, and, therefore, are more likely to accept a higher price.

In early 2000s, the Saturday-night stay rule vanished due to competition from low-cost carriers, which commonly do not impose the rule and often sell one-way fares only. However, the practice of pricing according to Saturday-night stay reappeared in 2008.
