= Great Plains Airlines =

Regional American airline (2001–2004)

IATA	ICAO	Call sign
ZO	OZR	OZARK
- Founded: 2001; 25 years ago
- Ceased operations: 2004; 22 years ago
- Hubs: Will Rogers World Airport (Oklahoma City); Tulsa International Airport
- Fleet size: 5
- Destinations: 11
- Headquarters: Tulsa, Oklahoma, United States
- Key people: Jack Knight; Jim Swartz

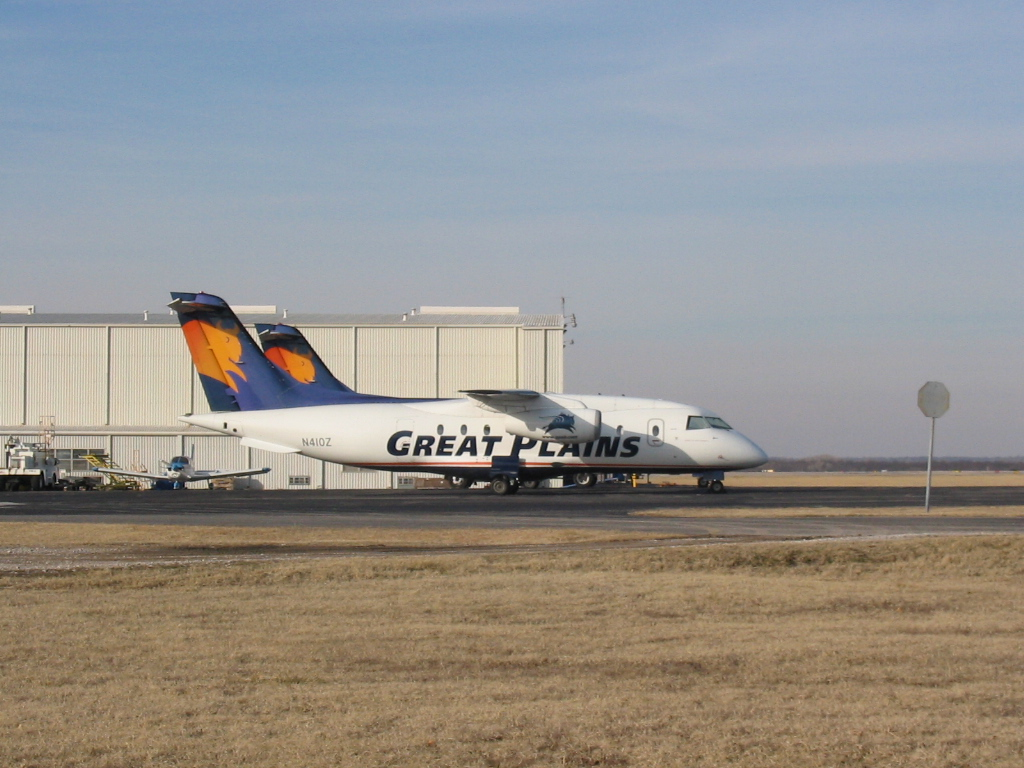
A Great Plains Airlines Dornier 328JET

Great Plains Airlines was a regional airline headquartered in Tulsa, Oklahoma.

== History ==
The airline was founded by Jack Knight and Jim Swartz to give Oklahoma City and Tulsa travelers affordable quality non-stop service to a number of destinations, ultimately with direct flights to heavily traveled business destinations on the east and west coasts. The airline was founded in 2001 with a mix of tax credits and government loans totaling $27 million and expanded rapidly, filing with the Air Transportation Stabilization Board for a guarantee of $17 million from a $25 million loan, though this was rejected, as the Board deemed the airline's business plan to be too risky.

To assist in starting the airline, an air operator's certificate was purchased from Ozark Airlines, an airline not related to the original Ozark Airlines, but a small regional airline operating Dornier 328JETs. The airline also took over operation of Ozark's two aircraft, and later expanded the fleet to five aircraft including a Dornier 328 turboprop by the time of the airline's closure.

In 2002 Great Plains joined with commuter airline Rio Grande Air to provide a feeder network from Albuquerque to the smaller New Mexico cities of Alamogordo and Taos as well as to Durango, Colorado. Rio Grande Air adopted Great Plains "ZO" code on their flights.

The airline filed for bankruptcy and ceased operations in 2004 after attempts to secure additional financing and investments were unsuccessful. After it ceased operations, all five of the company's aircraft were repossessed by creditors and all other property belonging to the airline was auctioned off. The airline also sold its tax credits to a third party for $15 million, but was ultimately unable to repay $7.1 million of a December 2000 loan arranged by local government agencies, triggering a lengthy dispute between the Tulsa Airport Improvement Trust (TAIT), the Tulsa Industrial Authority (TIA), the Bank of Oklahoma and the city of Tulsa. TAIT had guaranteed the loan by agreeing to buy the mortgaged Air Force Plant No. 3 adjacent to Tulsa International Airport from the TIA if the airline defaulted, but this agreement was deemed to violate Federal Aviation Administration policies prohibiting an airport authority from subsidizing a particular airline, and TAIT was sued by the TIA after declining to buy the plant for this reason. After a 2011 settlement attempt using city of Tulsa funds was rejected as illegal by the Oklahoma Supreme Court, the dispute was finally settled in August 2015 for $1.69 million.

The airline had several signature items, including Krispy Kreme donuts and Arby's sandwiches served on board.

== Destinations ==
- Albuquerque, New Mexico
- Austin, Texas
- Chicago, Illinois (Midway)
- Colorado Springs, Colorado
- Nashville, Tennessee
- Oklahoma City, Oklahoma
- St. Louis, Missouri
- Tulsa, Oklahoma
- Washington, DC (Dulles)

=== Code share with Rio Grande Air ===
- Alamogordo, New Mexico
- Durango, Colorado
- Taos, New Mexico

== Fleet ==
- Fairchild Dornier 328JET regional jet aircraft
- Fairchild Dornier 328 turboprop aircraft

== See also ==
- List of defunct airlines of the United States
