= Ozark Air Lines Flight 650 =

1983 aviation accident in South Dakota

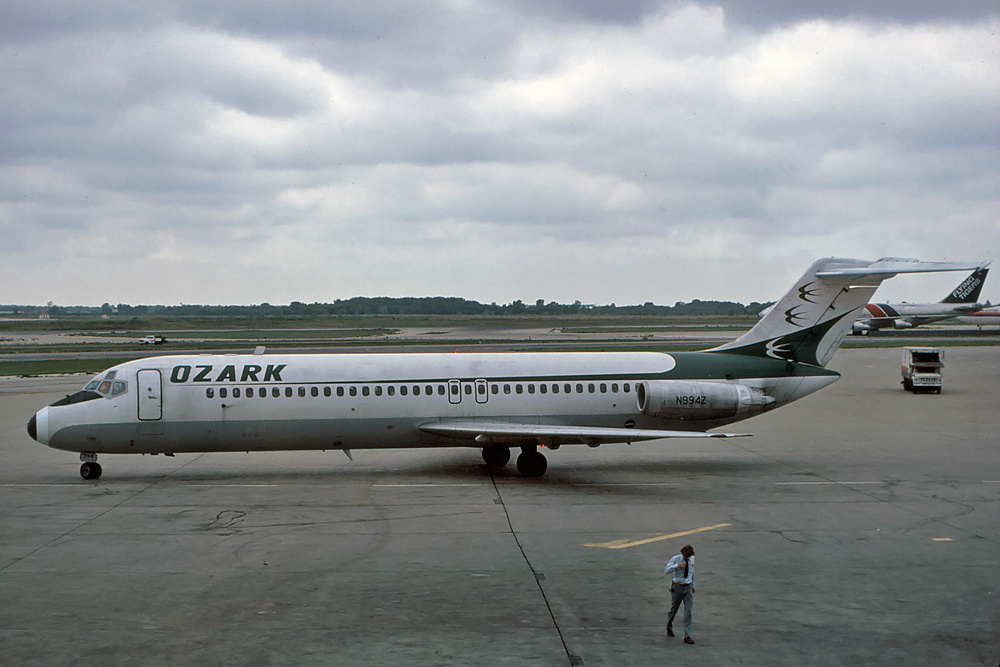
- N994Z, the aircraft involved in the accident, seen in 1979

Accident
- Date: December 20, 1983
- Summary: Collision with vehicle
- Site: Sioux Falls Regional Airport, Sioux Falls, South Dakota; 43°34′55″N 96°44′40″W
- Total fatalities: 1
- Total injuries: 2

Aircraft
- Aircraft type: McDonnell Douglas DC-9-31
- Operator: Ozark Air Lines
- IATA flight No.: OZ650
- ICAO flight No.: OZA650
- Call sign: OZARK 650
- Registration: N994Z
- Flight origin: Sioux Gateway Airport, Sioux City, Iowa
- Destination: Sioux Falls Regional Airport, Sioux Falls, South Dakota
- Occupants: 86
- Passengers: 81
- Crew: 5
- Fatalities: 0
- Injuries: 2
- Survivors: 86

Ground casualties
- Ground fatalities: 1

Ozark Air Lines Flight 650 was a regularly scheduled flight on December 20, 1983, from Sioux Gateway Airport in Sioux City, Iowa, to Sioux Falls Regional Airport in Sioux Falls, South Dakota. While landing in Sioux Falls, the McDonnell Douglas DC-9 struck a snow plow on the runway and burst into flames. The snow plow's driver was killed, and two flight attendants were injured.

== Aircraft ==
Ozark Air Lines Flight 650 was operated using a McDonnell Douglas DC-9-31 twin-engine, single-aisle jet airliner (registration N994Z). On December 20, 1983, Flight 650 departed Sioux City with 81 passengers, two flight attendants, and three flight crewmembers.

== Accident ==
Prior to departing Sioux City, Flight 650's flight crew obtained weather conditions for the flight via Sioux City's automatic terminal information service (ATIS) broadcast system. The ATIS report included reports of blowing snow at Sioux Falls.

Flight 650 departed Sioux City at 12:53 Central Standard Time, and climbed to an assigned altitude of 11,000 feet. At 13:06, the flight was handed off from Sioux City controllers to the Sioux Falls approach controller, who issued descent instructions to 3,400 feet and vectors to Runway 3 at Sioux Falls Regional Airport. Flight 650 was cleared for the approach at 13:11.

At 13:13, when Flight 650 was about 4 miles out from the airport, the Sioux Falls approach controller directed the flight to contact the airport tower. Flight 650's captain acknowledged the instruction, but did not contact the tower. When Flight 650 was about 2.5 miles out, the Sioux Falls tower called the flight, and the captain responded. The tower then cleared Flight 650 to land, giving a runway visual range of 3,500 feet. The tower did not advise Flight 650 of snow removal operations in progress on Runway 3.

The flight crew first saw the ground and airport approach lights after descending to an altitude of 200 feet, and then saw the runway. Because the ATIS report had advised of blowing snow, and the flight crew was not advised of snow blowing operations, they were not surprised to see snow blowing across the runway.

About 1,000 feet beyond the threshold of Runway 3, the aircraft made a smooth touchdown and the pilots deployed the spoilers. The copilot began to apply reverse thrusters when the aircraft entered a cloud of snow. The DC-9's right wing then struck a large snowsweeping vehicle on the runway. The impact ripped the right wing from the plane, destroying the snow plow and killing its driver, Douglas Stoner, age 38. Leaking fuel from the wing briefly created a fireball that engulfed the airplane but rapidly died out. The plane spun through 180° before coming to rest off the runway to the left of the centerline. Passenger evacuation was initiated through the front two doors. No passengers were injured in the evacuation, but two flight attendants suffered minor injuries.

== Investigation ==
The resulting NTSB investigation determined that the snow removal operations were controlled from the tower. The snow plow, call sign Sweeper 7, had been routinely directed to exit the runway to accommodate arrivals and departures. When Flight 650 was handed off from approach control to the tower it did not initiate contact with the tower. The tower controller eventually contacted the flight and cleared it to land. No communications had been made between the tower and Sweeper 7 after Flight 650 was handed off to the tower controller. Neither the approach nor tower controller had advised Flight 650 that snow removal operations were in progress. The hourly ATIS broadcast advised that blowing snow conditions were present, leading the flight crew to not be concerned when they witnessed snow blowing across the runway. The board concluded the snow removal operations were inadequately supervised by the tower.
