= Parks P-2 =

General information
- Type: 2-seat sport biplane
- National origin: United States
- Manufacturer: Parks Air College
- Number built: 16

History
- First flight: c. 1929
- Variant: Ryan Speedster

The Parks P-2, powered by a 150 hp Axelson-Floco B engine, was a biplane designed and built at the Parks Air College in the United States circa 1929. A change in engine type to the Wright J-6 resulted in the Parks P-2A, which was ultimately marketed as the Ryan Speedster after rights were bought by the Ryan company.

The Parks P-2A became the "hero" of books by author Richard Bach who also owned an example. The college quickly left the manufacturing business, selling the P-2A rights to Ryan as the Ryan Speedster, and later the Hammond 100.

== Specifications (P-2, Axelson engine) ==
Data from U.S. Civil Aircraft Vol. 2

General characteristics

- Crew: 1
- Capacity: 2 passengers
- Length: 23 ft 6 in (7.16 m)
- Upper wingspan: 30 ft 6 in (9.30 m)
- Lower wingspan: 28 ft 6 in (8.69 m)
- Height: 9 ft 3 in (2.82 m)
- Wing area: 285 sq ft (26.5 m^{2})
- Airfoil: Aeromarine 2A modified
- Empty weight: 1,458 lb (661 kg)
- Gross weight: 2,318 lb (1,051 kg)
- Fuel capacity: 50 US gal (42 imp gal; 190 L)
- Powerplant: 1 × Axelson 7-cylinder air-cooled radial engine, 115–150 hp (86–112 kW)

Performance

- Maximum speed: 115 mph (185 km/h, 100 kn)
- Cruise speed: 98 mph (158 km/h, 85 kn)
- Range: 490 mi (790 km, 430 nmi)
- Service ceiling: 14,000 ft (4,300 m)
- Rate of climb: 750 ft/min (3.8 m/s)
