= Spirit of St. Louis Airport =

Airport in Missouri, USA

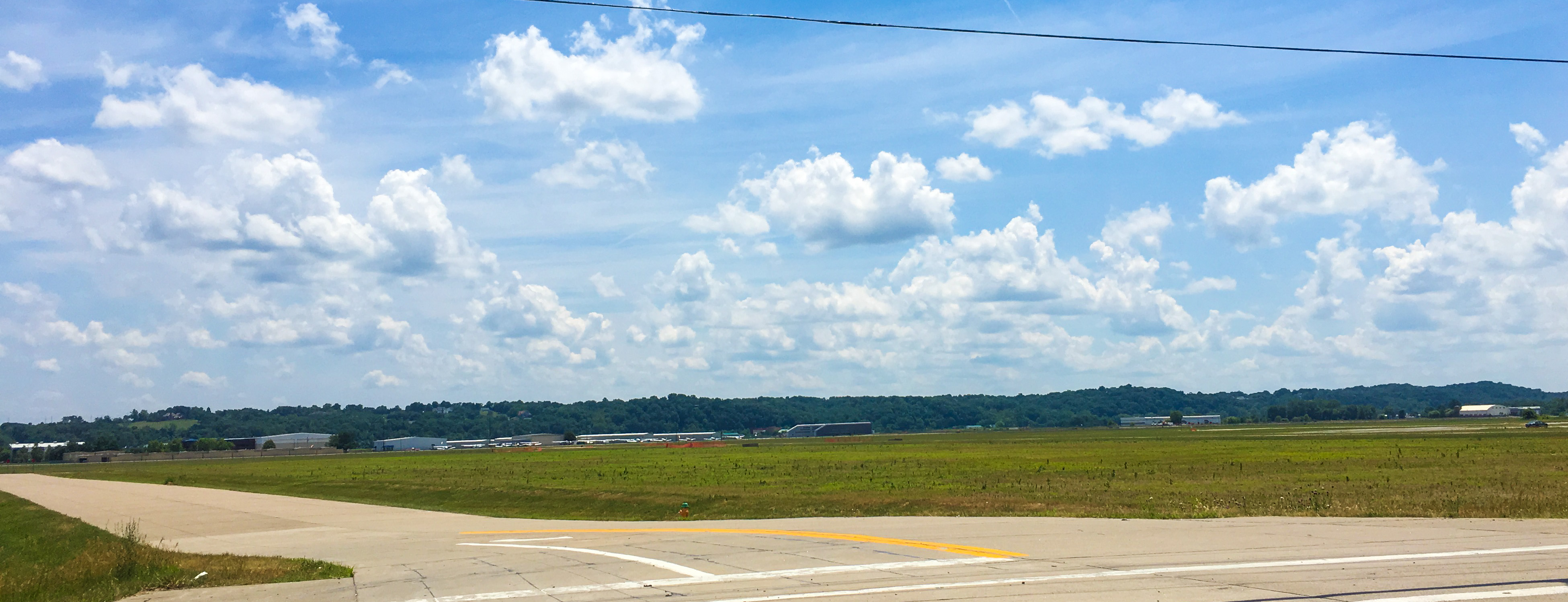
- IATA: SUS; ICAO: KSUS; FAA LID: SUS

Summary
- Airport type: Public
- Owner: St. Louis County
- Location: St. Louis, Missouri
- Elevation AMSL: 463 ft (141 m)
- Coordinates: 38°39′44″N 90°39′7″W
- Website: spiritairport.com

Map
- Location of airport in Missouri SUS (the United States)

Runways
| Direction | Length | | Surface |
| Direction | ft | m | Surface |
|---|---|---|---|
| 8R/26L | 7,485 | 2,281 | Concrete |
| 8L/26R | 5,000 | 1,524 | Asphalt |

Statistics (2022)
- Aircraft operations: 143,570
- Based aircraft: 295
- Source: Federal Aviation Administration

Spirit of St. Louis Airport (IATA: SUS, ICAO: KSUS, FAA LID: SUS) is a public airport located 17 miles (27 km) west of the central business district of St. Louis, in St. Louis County, Missouri, in the city of Chesterfield, United States. It is owned by St. Louis County and named after the famous Spirit of St. Louis aircraft.

== History ==
The idea for the Spirit of St. Louis Airport began in the 1950s when, Paul Haglin, a McDonnell engineer, began purchasing land along the Missouri River west of St. Louis. Groundbreaking for a 5,100-foot (1,600 m) runway was held on 8 November 1963. However, the development came into conflict with the owners of a nearby airport called Lobmaster Field. After the aforementioned owners filed a lawsuit against the airport, the FAA ruled that Spirit would have to build a control tower to regulate operations of both fields. A judge then issued a restraining order, delaying a planned opening of the airport in early September 1964. After Haglin agreed to pay damages, it opened November 6th and was dedicated 21 August 1965. (Note: The construction of U.S. Route 40 in 1968 eventually closed Lobmaster Airport.) Pulitzer Publishing and Ralston Purina purchased land at the airport in July 1966 and by 1969, Monsanto and Emerson Electric had announced they were locating operations at a 1,052-acre (426 ha) industrial park of which the airport was part. A project begun by January 1969 included a new control tower cab, which was sited on an earthen mound to eliminate the need for the tower itself. By May 1970, an instrument landing system had been installed and the runway was extended to 6,000 feet (1,800 m).

The Republic National Life Insurance Company purchased the airport in 1974 after it had trouble paying loans. The FAA took over operation of the air traffic control tower in December, saving the airport money. A new 14,000-square-foot (1,300 m^{2}) terminal and flight service station was finished in late 1975. St. Louis County began contemplating purchasing the airport by January 1976. (Note: The county had been considering building a second airport to supplement Lambert Field since at least 1971.)

The county asked for federal financial assistance to purchase the airport in May 1978. At the time, it was noted that the airport was perhaps the only reliever for a major airport in private ownership. However, the request would use the majority of funds allocated to all general aviation airports in the United States. To allow land near the airport to be rezoned for industrial development, a report was prepared that suggested it was protected from all but 500-year floods. However, it was discovered that contradictory data – that the levee would only protect from a 50-year flood – was omitted from the report. The revelation meant that the airport could not obtain flood insurance, in turn making the airport ineligible for the grant. As a result, the airport director organized a group of businessmen to raise money to improve the levee. On 1 January 1980, 822 acres (333 ha) of the airport – all but 80 acres (32 ha) retained by Republic – were taken over by the county.

The county began planning a 4,100-acre (1,700 ha) industrial park in November 1982. During the 20th anniversary celebrations, a new 3,800-foot (1,200 m) runway was dedicated. As part of a plan to move their operations from Lambert Field announced in July 1986, Anheuser-Busch offered to help pay for lengthening the south runway. The St. Louis Aviation Museum announced plans to build a facility at the airport in September. An extension of the south runway to 7,000-foot (2,100 m), a new control tower and a new flight service station were due to be dedicated in October. Federal grants to build a heliport, extend the main taxiway and purchase a 35-acre (14 ha) clear zone were awarded by late April 1988. The airport was struck by a tornado on 7 June 1990 that destroyed or damaged 16 airplanes. Two months later, the installation of a new NEXRAD Doppler weather radar at the nearby National Weather Service station in St. Peters was approved.

An anticipated increase in flights led to the beginning of planning to extend the north runway by mid December 1991. The proposal also called for lengthening the south runway to 7,500 feet (2,300 m). However, a leftover measurement from an earlier draft of the master plan resulted in some residents believing that the north runway would be extended to 7,000 feet (2,100 m) instead of 5,500 feet (1,700 m). The following month, the airport held a public meeting to address the concerns. By September 1992, projects to build 57 hangar units and improve drainage for the southern runway were under construction. That month, the first St. Louis County Fair and Air Show was held at the airport. As a result of serious damage from the 1993 Missouri River Flood, the second show was cancelled. However, it returned in 1994 with additional roads and parking on the west side of the airport.

It became an international airport in 1997. The northern runway was extended to 5,000 feet (1,500 m) in 1999. By 2000, the growth of the airport raised noise complaints from nearby residents. Partially in attempt to mitigate these effects, the Landings at Spirit Golf Club opened as a sound buffer the same year.

Richard Hrabko, who had been the airport director for 43 years, was appointed to run Lambert Field in April 2007.

In 2007, the airport finished project to add a parallel taxiway to the north of 8L/26R.

The Spirit of St. Louis Air Show returned to the airport in May 2014 after being absent since 2007.

Plans for an eight hangar development were announced in April 2021.

== Facilities and aircraft ==
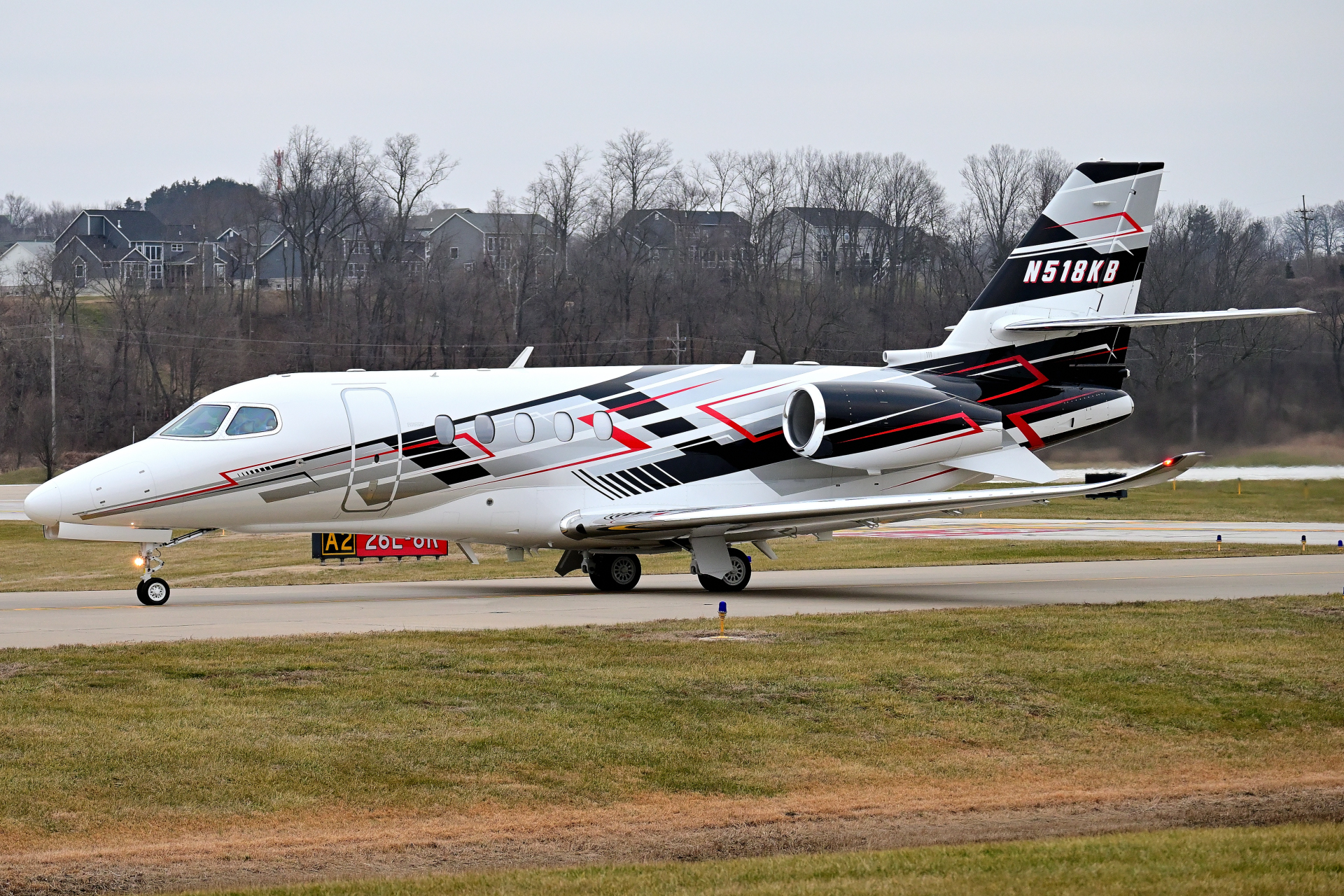
A typical business jet at the airport

Spirit of St. Louis Airport covers an area of 1,300 acres (530 ha) and contains two parallel runways: 8L/26R measuring 5,000 x 75 ft (1,524 x 23 m) and 8R/26L measuring 7,485 x 150 (2,281 x 46 m), an all-weather, ILS-equipped runway.

For the 12-month period ending December 31, 2022, the airport had 143,570 aircraft operations, an average of 393 per day: 88% general aviation, 10% air taxi, <1% military and <1% commercial. At that time, there were 295 aircraft based at this airport: 180 single-engine, 37 multi-engine, 69 jet, 7 helicopter, 1 glider and 1 ultra-light.

Wings of Hope, a charity providing supplies to remote areas of the word, is located at the airport.

== Accidents and incidents ==
- On 6 February 1994, a Beechcraft Travel Air crashed after taking off from the airport, killing the two pilots.
- On 23 March 1994, a Piper Cherokee crashed while taking off from the airport, killing the pilot, local television weatherman, Bob Richards. The nature of the crash and Richard's recent legal problems led to speculation that the accident was a suicide.
- On 6 December 2017, a Beechcraft Bonanza crashed while landing at the airport, killing the pilot.
- On 17 March 2026, an Aero Commander 500B crashed after taking off from the airport, killing the pilot.

== See also ==
- List of airports in Missouri
