= Ozark Air Lines =

Airline of the United States (1950–1986)

IATA	ICAO	Call sign
OZ	OZA	OZARK
- Founded: September 1, 1943
- Commenced operations: September 26, 1950
- Ceased operations: October 26, 1986 (integrated into Trans World Airlines)
- Hubs: St. Louis Lambert International Airport
- Fleet size: 50
- Destinations: Ozark Mainline cities: 57; Ozark Midwest cities: 21
- Parent company: Trans World Corporation
- Headquarters: St. Louis County, Missouri, U.S.
- Key people: Laddie Hamilton (president, 1950–1959); Joseph A. Fitzgerald (president, 1959–1963); Floyd Jones (acting president, 1963–1964); Thomas L. Grace (president, 1964–1971); Edward J. Crane (president, 1971–1986); Lester L. Cox (chairman, 1972–1986)

Ozark Air Lines was a local service carrier, a scheduled airline in the United States that operated from 1950 until it was purchased by Trans World Airlines (TWA) in 1986. Ozark got a second chance to be an airline when the carrier that won the routes for which Ozark applied, Parks Air Lines, failed to start them in a timely manner. Parks had its rights revoked, Ozark won not only the routes it previously applied for, but others as well. Parks merged into Ozark and Ozark (then without any airline operations) took over the Parks operation and the single route over which Parks had recently started service, thereby launching Ozark. Ozark over time became a jet carrier with a hub in St. Louis.

In 2001, TWA was merged into American Airlines. A smaller regional airline that used the Ozark name (and whose operating certificate was purchased by Great Plains Airlines) operated in 2000–2001. From 1950 until 1986, Ozark's headquarters was located at St. Louis Lambert International Airport.

== History ==
=== Pre-certification ===
Ozark Air Lines was incorporated on 1 September 1943 in Missouri by Laddie Hamilton, Barak Mattingly and Floyd Jones with $100,000 in paid-up capital. Ozark flew from Springfield, Missouri, and, in January 1945, it began flights between Springfield and St. Louis on Beechcraft Model 17 Staggerwings, replaced by Cessna AT-17 Bobcats in the late 1940s.

Ozark applied for certification as a feeder or local service airline in the Mississippi Valley Case of Civil Aeronautics Board (CAB). The CAB was the now-defunct federal agency that, at the time, tightly regulated almost all air transport in the United States. Without certification from the CAB (or, in some cases, flying solely within a single state as an intrastate airline), no airline could operate. When the CAB ruled in that case in December 1947, Ozark was shut out.

=== Parks Air Lines ===
Ozark inherited the Great Lakes and Mississippi Valley routes from Parks Air Lines

The dark green Ozark Air Lines logo

Another Ozark Air Lines logo

One of the winning airlines in the Mississippi Valley Case was Parks Air Transport, controlled by aviation entrepreneur Oliver Parks, best known for his prominent role in developing pilot training. This was the third case in which PAT won routes, leaving it with the largest portfolio of feeder routes in the country, one that was regarded as potentially the "richest" such in the industry. But Parks failed to start service on his network and in June 1949, the CAB started proceedings to potentially revoke the certification of his airline, now called Parks Air Lines (PAL). As part of those proceedings, the CAB accepted applications for airlines to take over PAL's routes and Ozark renewed its application. The CAB came to a final decision in July 1950, revoking PAL's certification and awarded Ozark not only PAL's Mississippi Valley Case routes, but also those PAL routes from the Great Lakes Area case. In June 1950, PAL finally started flying a route from East St. Louis to Chicago via St. Louis and three central Illinois cities. An appeals court said PAL could keep operating this one route until the effective date of the CAB order (September 26, 1950) but would not prevent the CAB from enforcing the order while PAL pursued a full court case. PAL agreed to sell its airline operation (including five DC-3s) to Ozark in exchange for 37.5% of the business. Ozark had no airline operations at the time, so PAL's operations became those of Ozark and in this way, Ozark Air Lines started service on that one Chicago route on September 26, 1950. Ozark retained operations at PAL's Cahokia, Illinois home airport, then known as Parks Metropolitan Airport, today as St. Louis Downtown Airport, for a period. For instance, Ozark's maintenance base moved from there to St. Louis in 1952.

=== After Parks ===
Services were started on September 26, 1950, using Douglas DC-3s initially from St. Louis to Chicago later to Tulsa and Memphis. In 1955, the airline had 13 DC-3s flying to 35 cities between Sioux City, Indianapolis, Wichita, and Nashville. Ozark's main hub was St. Louis Lambert International Airport. Like other Local Service airlines, it was subsidized; in 1962, its operating revenues of US$14 million (equivalent to US$149 million in 2025) included US$4.5 million (equivalent to US$48 million in 2025) of federal subsidy.

In 1960, turboprop Fairchild F-27s were introduced; piston-engine Martin 4-0-4s were added to the fleet in 1964 and removed in 1967.

One of three co-founders, Arthur G. Heyne was an attorney in St. Louis, Missouri, and served as Secretary-Treasurer starting in 1950.

The three swallows on Ozark fins represented on-time flights, referring to the legend of the swallows that return to the Mission San Juan Capistrano, in California, each year on 19 March.

=== Jets ===
Revenue passenger traffic, in millions of passenger-miles (scheduled flights only)

Year	Pax-Miles
1951	8
1955	36
1960	99
1965	229
1970	653
1975	936

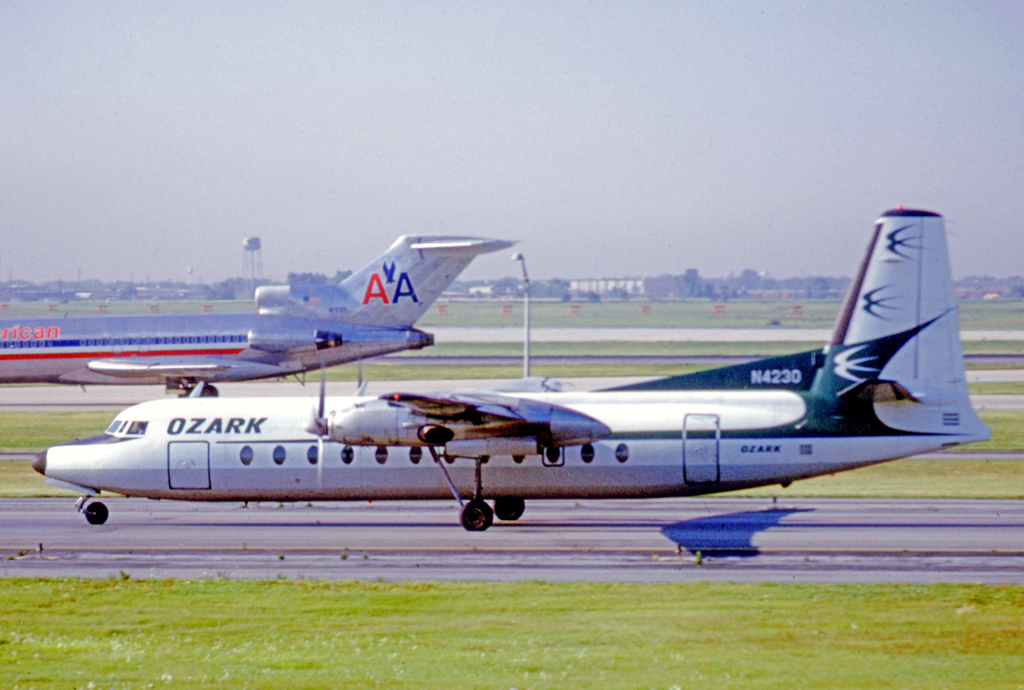
Fairchild-Hiller FH-227B at Chicago O'Hare Airport in 1975

In 1961, Ozark's network reached from Minneapolis to Nashville and from Kansas City to Indianapolis and Louisville. Denver was added in 1966 and, in 1969, the network sprouted eastward: Ozark was awarded nonstops from Champaign and Peoria to Washington Dulles, continuing to New York LaGuardia. Atlanta was added in 1978 and four Florida cities in winter 1978–1979.

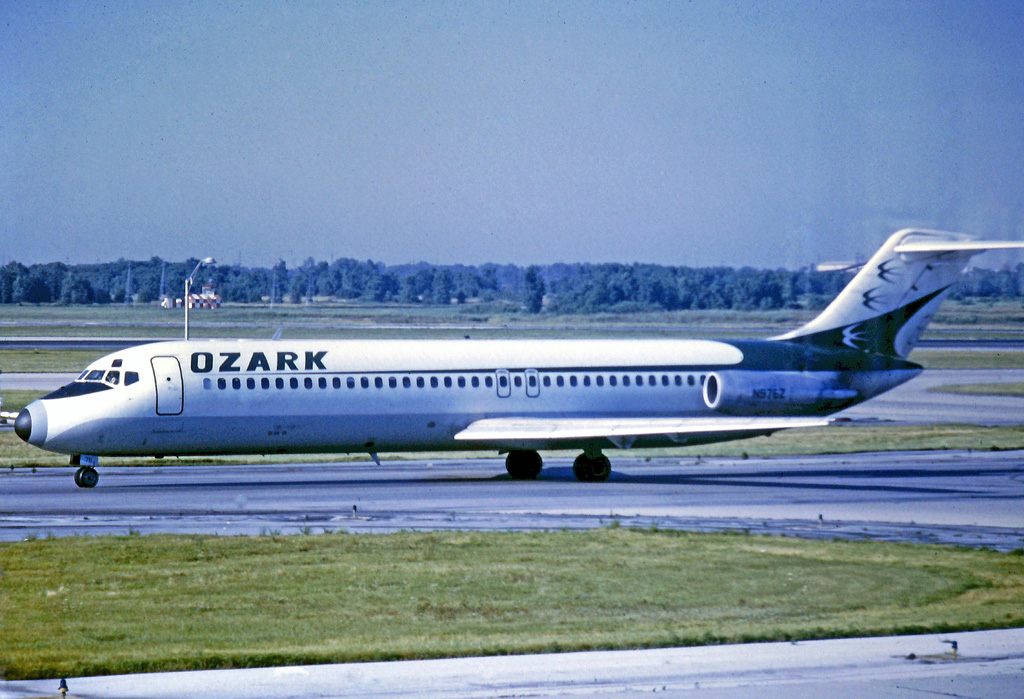
Ozark Douglas DC-9-31 at O'Hare in 1975

In September 1966, Ozark and Central Airlines announced plans to merge, subject to CAB approval; the new airline was to retain the Ozark name and would be one of the largest local service carriers in the U.S. However, in November 1966, the two airlines announced that merger talks had ended by mutual consent due to financing difficulties.

By 1967, the Martins and F-27s were replaced with Fairchild Hiller FH-227s, a stretched F-27; Ozark was all-turbine after the last DC-3 flight in October 1968. Ozark's introduced its first jets in July, 1966 with the Douglas DC-9-10s. The DC-9-10s were later augmented with McDonnell Douglas DC-9-30s (DC-9-31/32) and McDonnell Douglas DC-9-40s. The airline also ordered two Boeing 727-200s but never took delivery. In late 1980, Ozark retired its last FH-227 prop aircraft and went all jet with an all DC-9 fleet. Several very small cities including Burlington, Fort Dodge, and Mason City in Iowa, Decatur, Marion, and Quincy in Illinois, and Cape Girardeau, Missouri, briefly saw DC-9 jet service before Ozark discontinued serving those cities in 1982. In 1984, larger McDonnell Douglas MD-80s were added.

=== Ozark Midwest ===
In 1985 Ozark began a code-share agreement with Air Midwest, a commuter airline operating 17-seat Fairchild Swearingen Metroliners. The operation was called Ozark Midwest and the Air Midwest aircraft were painted with green stripes, similar to Ozark but without the swallows. Ozark Midwest provided feeder service to Ozark from many smaller cities in the midwest that were not able to support large DC-9 jets including several cities that Ozark had previously discontinued.

=== Merger with TWA ===
In the mid-1980s Ozark and TWA had a de facto duopoly at St. Louis Lambert International Airport, as it was a major hub for both. Ozark accounted for 26.3 percent of boardings at STL in 1985, while TWA accounted for 56.6 percent. (Note: "Airline Competition: Fare and Service Changes at St. Louis Since the TWA–Ozark Merger" (PDF). Government Accountability Office. 1988-09-21. Archived from the original on 2022-07-27.) On March 1, 1986, the two airlines announced plans to merge: TWA would buy Ozark for US$242 million in cash (equivalent to US$711 million in 2025). Shareholders of both airlines approved the merger by late summer, and the United States Department of Transportation gave its approval on September 12, 1986.

Ozark ceased to exist as an independent company on October 27, 1986. The Ozark DC-9s were gradually painted with a modified paint scheme with "TWA" in the tail. Over the next couple of years, the fifty Ozark airplanes were repainted in the TWA livery. On December 1, 2001, TWA was merged into American Airlines.

=== Second Ozark Air Lines (2000–2001) ===
In 1998, rights to the airline's name were purchased by William E. Stricker of Columbia, Missouri. The reformed Ozark Air Lines received its operating certificate on February 11, 2000, and began service 10 days later, (Note: Chase, Nan (2001-01-01). "Home Grown". Air & Space/Smithsonian. ISSN 0886-2257. OCLC 1054386888. Archived from the original on 2022-06-14.) from Columbia Regional Airport to Dallas/Fort Worth International Airport and Chicago Midway Airport, using two Fairchild Dornier 328JET aircraft. Later in 2000, service was added to Joplin Regional Airport in Joplin, Missouri, as a stop between Columbia and Dallas/Fort Worth. In early 2001, Ozark operated seasonally to the Taos Regional Airport serving Taos, New Mexico, from Dallas/Fort Worth twice a week during the winter ski season.

A year later, the company ceased operations and sold its assets to Great Plains Airlines, based in Tulsa, Oklahoma.

== Sales and marketing ==
=== Reservations ===
From the 1960s through the late 1980s, Ozark Air Lines' reservations department used a special toll-free WX telephone prefix in New Jersey which could be reached only in certain areas of the state by dialing 0 and asking the New Jersey Bell operator to connect to Ozark's WX number: WX-8300. The number could not be dialed directly by the customer and was only available to certain telephone exchanges where WX was available. (Direct-dial toll-free service made WX numbers obsolete, and they have been largely phased out.)

=== Advertising ===
In the late 1960s, comedian George Carlin appeared in Ozark advertising.

== Fleet ==
World Airline Fleets 1979 (copyright 1979) lists Ozark as having the following fleet:

- 13 Fairchild-Hiller FH-227B
- 7 Douglas DC-9-15
- 20 Douglas DC-9-31
- 4 Douglas DC-9-32
- 1 Douglas DC-9-33CF

Eight of the DC-9-31s were former Northeast Airlines aircraft.

Ozark Air Lines operated the following aircraft:

Aircraft	Total	Introduced	Retired	Notes
Boeing 727-200	2	1979	1979	Never entered service and sold to Pan Am
Convair CV-240	7	1962	1965	
de Havilland Canada DHC-6 Twin Otter	3	1972	1974	Used to serve Chicago Meigs Field
Douglas C-47 Skytrain	29	1950	1971	
Fairchild F-27	7	1959	1967	
Fairchild FH-227B	21	1966	1981	
Martin 4-0-4	15	1964	1968	
McDonnell Douglas DC-9-10	10	1968	1986	
McDonnell Douglas DC-9-30	37	1968	1986	
McDonnell Douglas DC-9-40	3	1982	1986	
McDonnell Douglas MD-82	4	1984	1986	

== Accidents and incidents ==
- On March 27, 1968, Ozark Air Lines Flight 965, a Douglas DC-9-15, collided in midair with a Cessna 150F while both aircraft were on approach to runway 17 at Lambert–St. Louis Municipal Airport (Lambert Field), St. Louis, Missouri. The Cessna was demolished by the collision and ground impact, and both of its occupants were killed. The DC-9 sustained light damage and was able to land safely; none of its 44 passengers or five crewmembers were injured. (Note: "Midair collision, Ozark Air Lines, Inc., DC-9, N970Z And Interstate Airmotive, Inc., Cessna 150F, N8669G, St. Louis, Missouri, March 27, 1968" (PDF). fss.aero. 1969-06-30. Archived from the original on 2022-05-31.)
- On December 27, 1968, Ozark Air Lines Flight 982 crashed shortly after takeoff from Sioux Gateway Airport. 35 of the flight's 62 passengers and 4 crew members were taken to area hospitals, mostly for treatment of minor cuts and scratches. It was the "first crash of any significance for the airline." The US$3 million DC-9 aircraft (equivalent to US$28 million in 2025) was a total loss. (Note: "Loss of roll control, Ozark Air Lines, Inc., Douglas DC-9-15, N974Z, Sioux City Airport, Sioux City, Iowa, December 27, 1968". fss.aero. Archived from the original on 2022-01-23.)
- On July 23, 1973, Ozark Air Lines Flight 809, a Fairchild Hiller FH-227B, crashed while on approach to Lambert–St. Louis International Airport. Of the 45 passengers and crew on board, only seven survived. Microburst-induced windshear and the captain's decision to land in a thunderstorm were cited as the cause.
- On December 20, 1983, Ozark Air Lines Flight 650, a McDonnell Douglas DC-9-31, struck a snow plow while landing at Sioux Falls Regional Airport. The driver of the snow plow was killed and two flight attendants suffered minor injuries. No passengers were injured.

== See also ==
- List of defunct airlines of the United States
