= Parks College of Engineering, Aviation and Technology =

College within Saint Louis University

- Type: Private
- Active: 1927–2022
- Parent institution: Saint Louis University
- Affiliations: Roman Catholic – Jesuit
- Dean: Gregory Triplett, Jr
- Location: St. Louis, Missouri, U.S. 38°38′11″N 90°13′47″W
- Campus: Urban
- Website: parks.slu.edu

Parks College of Engineering, Aviation and Technology was a college within Saint Louis University. It formed from the pre-existing Parks Air College, founded by Oliver Parks in 1927. Its successor is the Oliver L. Parks Department of Aviation Science within the SLU School of Science and Engineering at Saint Louis University.

== History ==
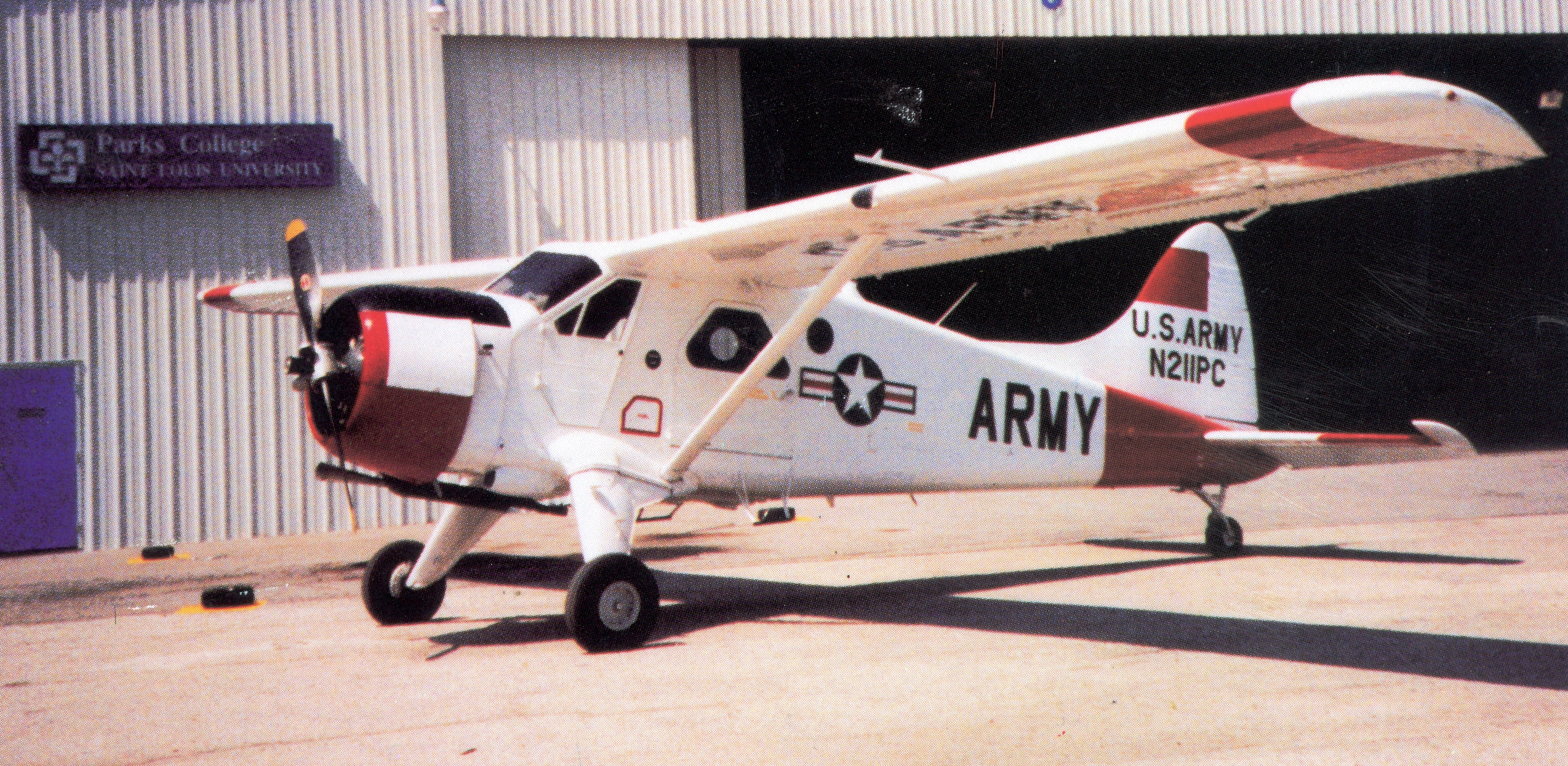
de Havilland Canada DHC-2 Beaver restored by Parks students in 1991

=== Parks Air College ===
Parks Air College was founded by Oliver Parks in the city of East Saint Louis, Illinois in 1927. It was America's first federally certified school of aviation, holding the FAA Air Agency Certificate no. 1. Oliver Parks had two trainer aircraft and was the sole flight instructor at Lambert Airfield. The venture nearly ended when Parks crashed a Laird Swallow training aircraft leaving only one remaining trainer and was unable to teach lessons while in the hospital. He bought 100 acres in East St. Louis in 1928 and built five buildings the same year. By 1929 Parks operated 35 Travel Air trainers with an enrollment of 600 students.

Parks College was initially a publicly traded company. During the Great Depression, the Detroit Aircraft Corporation bought up eighty percent of the stock as part of a large merger of aviation entities. Oliver Parks sold most of his assets to buy back a controlling interest. The college students manufactured their own series of biplane aircraft, including the Parks P-2A, which became the "hero" of books by author Richard Bach. The college quickly got out of the manufacturing business, selling the P2A rights to Ryan leading to the Ryan Speedster, and later the Hammond 100.

In 1931 Parks offered an Executive Transport Pilot's course. In the 1930s those enrolled as aeronautical engineers were required to design, construct and test fly their own aircraft. In 1935, Parks College started Parks College Airline, a student-run airline on a single route between the college and Chicago, Memphis, Indianapolis, and Kansas City. The airline operated into the 1950s flying Cessna T-50 Bamboo Bombers.

By 1936 enrollment reached 200 students, with a training fleet that consisted of 49 aircraft including the Kinner Sportster and Lambert Twin Monocoach. Student activities included fraternal participation. Park Air College hosted chapters of Kappa Delta Rho, Phi Alpha Chi, Alpha Phi Omega, Alpha Pi Sigma, Alpha Beta Gamma, Delta Beta Pi (local), Alpha Omicron Pi, and Kappa Theta Epsilon.

=== World War II ===
In 1938 Oliver Parks, (representing Parks Air College,) Curtis-Wright Technical Institute, and Boeing School of Aeronautics were requested by Gen Arnold to establish, at their own risk, a Civilian Pilot Training Program including barracks and aircraft to provide basic training for thousands of pilots. As enrollment swelled, Parks further expanded his facilities to include operations at Cape Girardeau and Sikeston, Missouri, Tuscaloosa, Alabama, and Jackson, Mississippi. Parks College trained thousands of aviators and aircraft mechanics during World War II. By the end of the war, more than 37,000 cadets (more than 10% of the Air Corps) had received their primary flight instruction at a Parks institution. A variety of training aircraft were used including PT-13, PT-17, PT-19, and the locally built PT-15 trainers.

In 1944 Parks started a training curriculum to train female pilots. The students flew in ERCO Ercoupes with two-control flight systems.

=== Merger with Saint Louis University ===
Following the rapid decline in wartime training, Parks concluded that future aviation leaders would need a broader, more academic education. Parks donated the college valued at $3 million to Saint Louis University in 1946, remembering the Jesuit help he received after his 1928 air crash.

Wernher von Braun donated a V-2 rocket engine from the White Sands Missile Range to the college after a visit in the 1950s.

By the late 1990s Parks campus expanded to eighteen buildings, including a Mach 4 windtunnel. The training fleet consisted of Cessna 152, Mooney 201 and Cessna 310 models. Women in Aviation International founder, Dr. Peggy Baty, joined Parks College serving from 1990 to 1995.

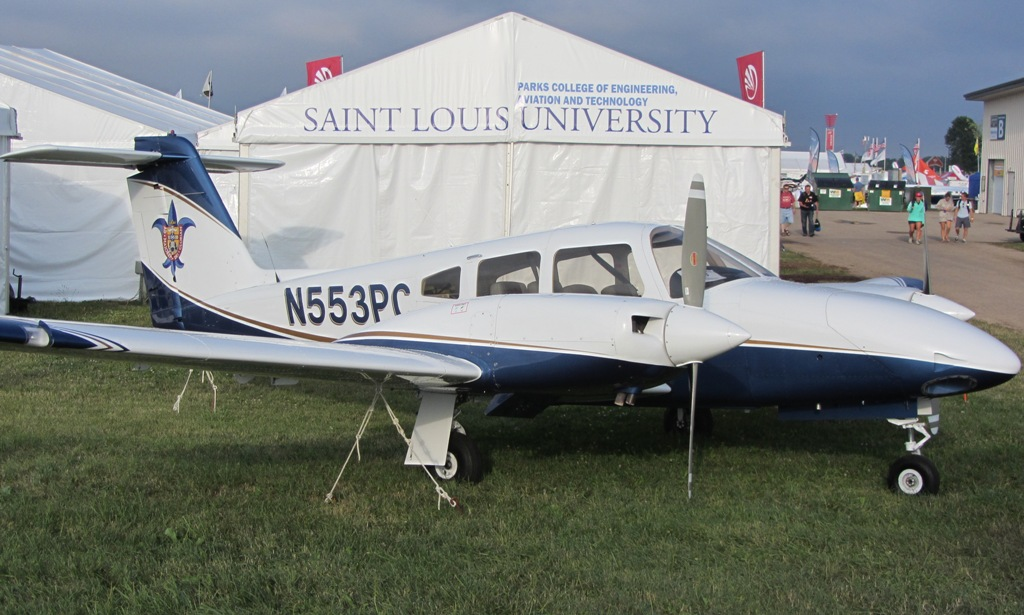
A Parks Piper Seminole multi-engine trainer on display in 2011

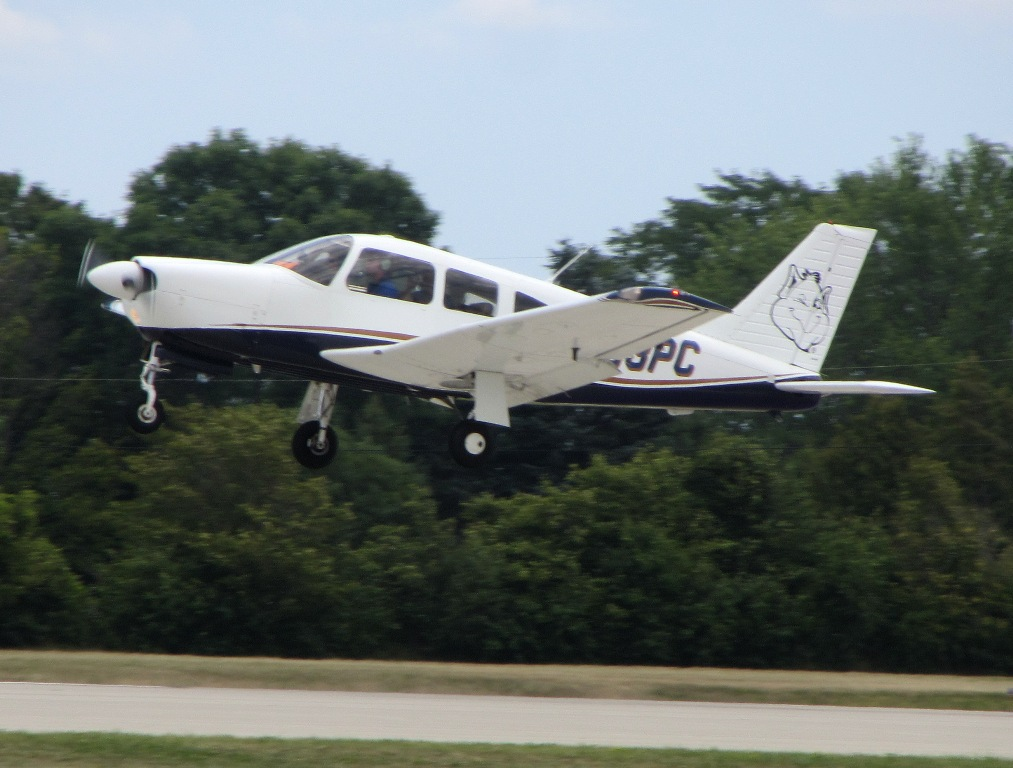
A Parks Piper Arrow landing

== Recent history ==
In 1996, Saint Louis University closed the historic Cahokia, Illinois campus and later sold it to the village. Classes are now held in the new McDonnell-Douglas Hall building on the Frost Campus in mid-town St. Louis. Flight training remained at St. Louis Downtown Airport. The move to the Frost campus allowed the curriculum to be expanded and Masters programs to be added. The college also provides many science classes for the main campus.

Now known as Parks College of Engineering, Aviation, and Technology, it is a modern, growing, and active part of the university. In 2008, the FAA granted the college a $2.25 million grant to form the Center for Aviation Safety Research. The center is focused on safety management systems, safety culture, maintenance aviation safety programs, next-generation safety assessment, incident investigation, multi-risk analysis, and next-generation maintenance and engineering.

In November 2013, Parks engineering students launched COPPER from the Wallops Flight Facility. The microsatellite will be controlled from the St. Louis campus for a year.

In 2022, the former Parks College of Engineering, Aviation and Technology became the Oliver L. Parks Department of Aviation Science, part of the SLU School of Science and Engineering at Saint Louis University.

== Academic departments ==
- Aerospace & Mechanical Engineering
- Aviation Science
- Biomedical Engineering
- Electrical & Computer Engineering
- Civil Engineering
- Interdisciplinary Engineering
- Physics

== Notable alumni ==
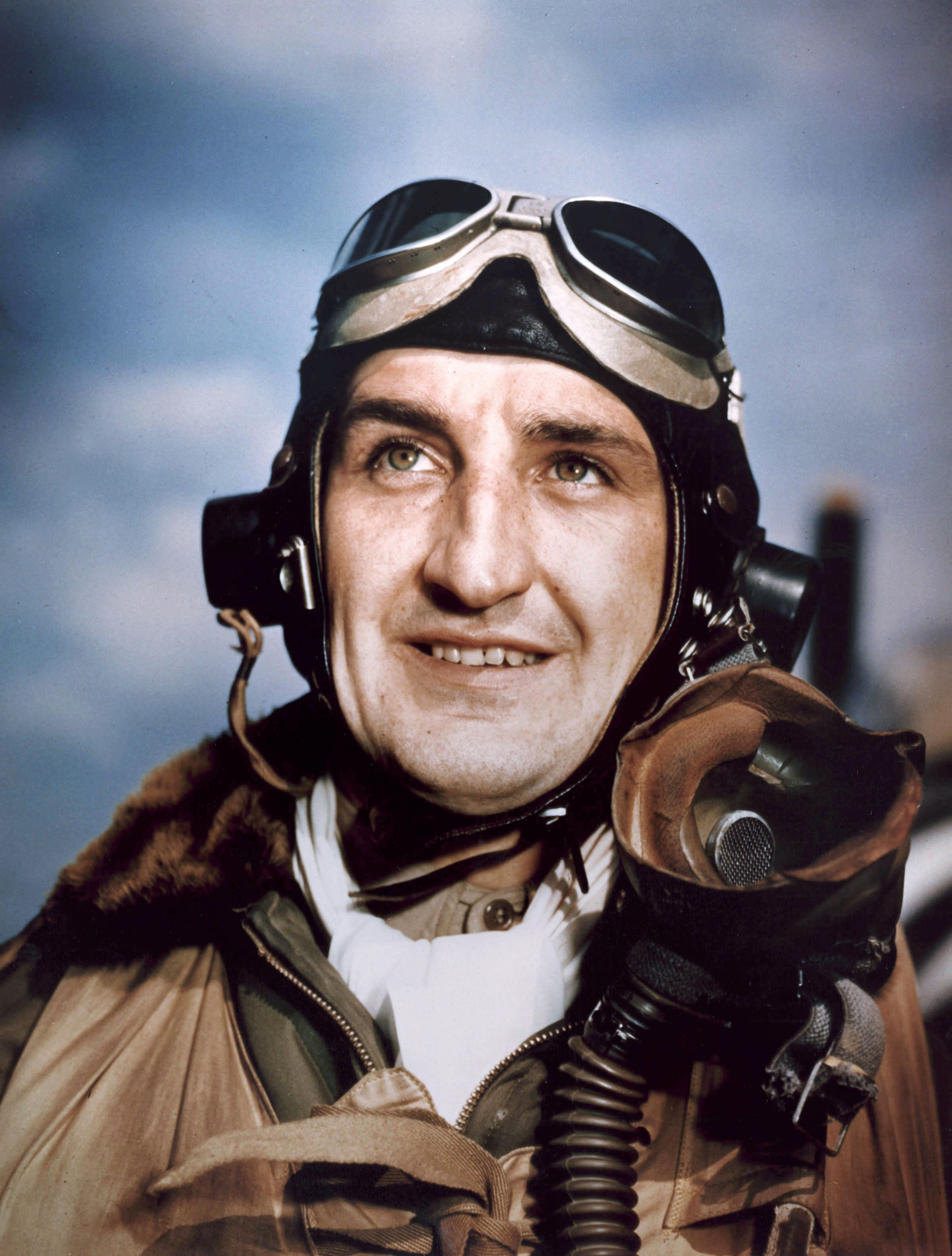
World War II Ace Francis Gabreski

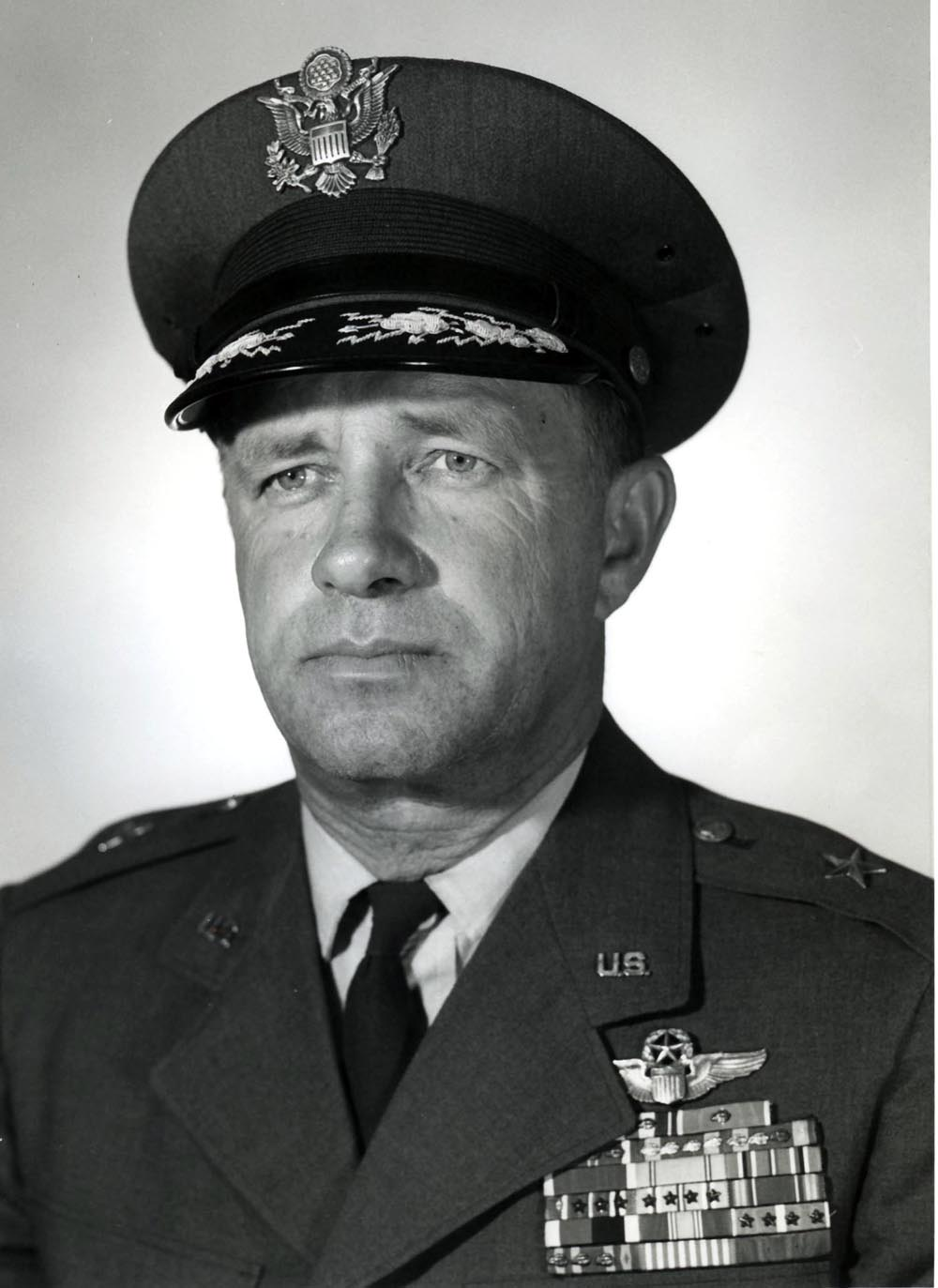
General Harrison Thyng

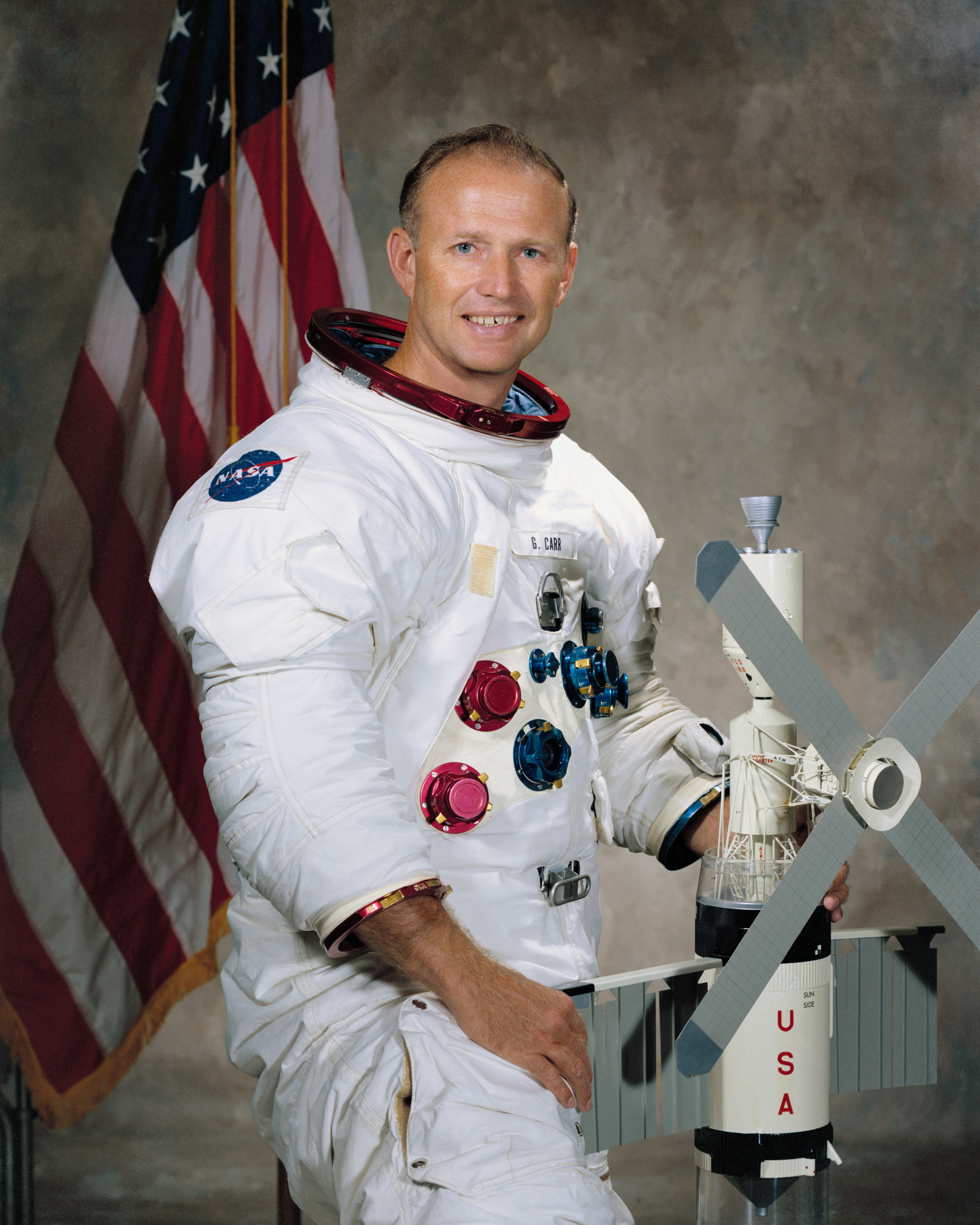
Gerald P. Carr (Honorary)

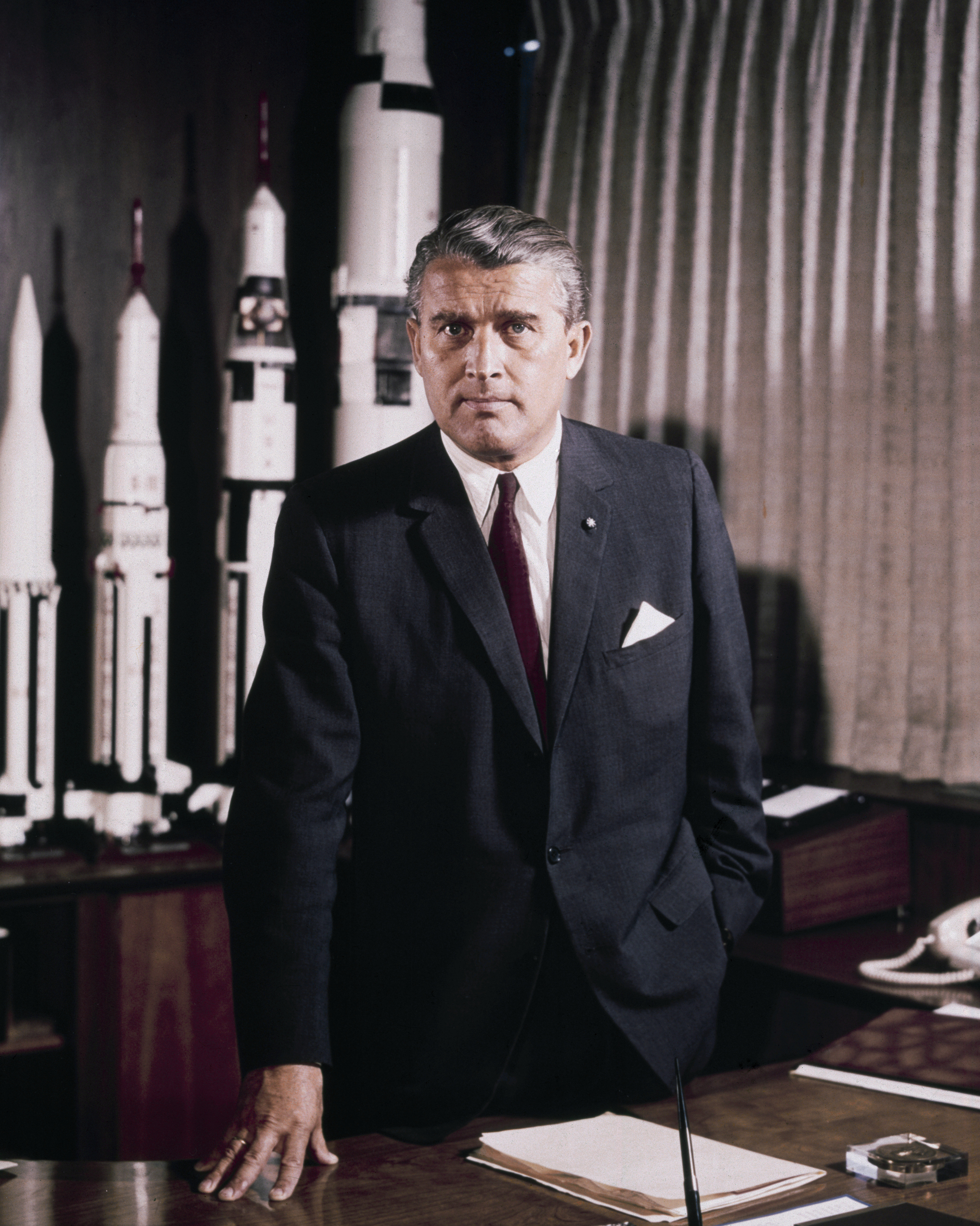
Wernher von Braun (Honorary)

=== Parks Air College ===
- Francis Gabreski – World War II Ace who received primary training at Parks
- Harrison Thyng – World War II and Korean War ace

=== Parks College of Engineering, Aviation and Technology ===
- Wernher von Braun (honorary) – aerospace engineer
- Gerald P. Carr (1976, honorary) – NASA Skylab 4 commander
- Gene Kranz – NASA flight director
- Earl T. Ricks – United States Air Force Major General, director of the Air National Guard, and mayor of Hot Springs, Arkansas
- Jeffrey Standerski – a senior vice president at Rockwell Collins, a defunct aerospace company
- Richard G. Thomas (Aeronautical Engineering) – Northrop test pilot at the Tacit Blue/Area 51, known for F-5 spin tests
