= St. Louis Downtown Airport =

Airport in St. Clair County, Illinois

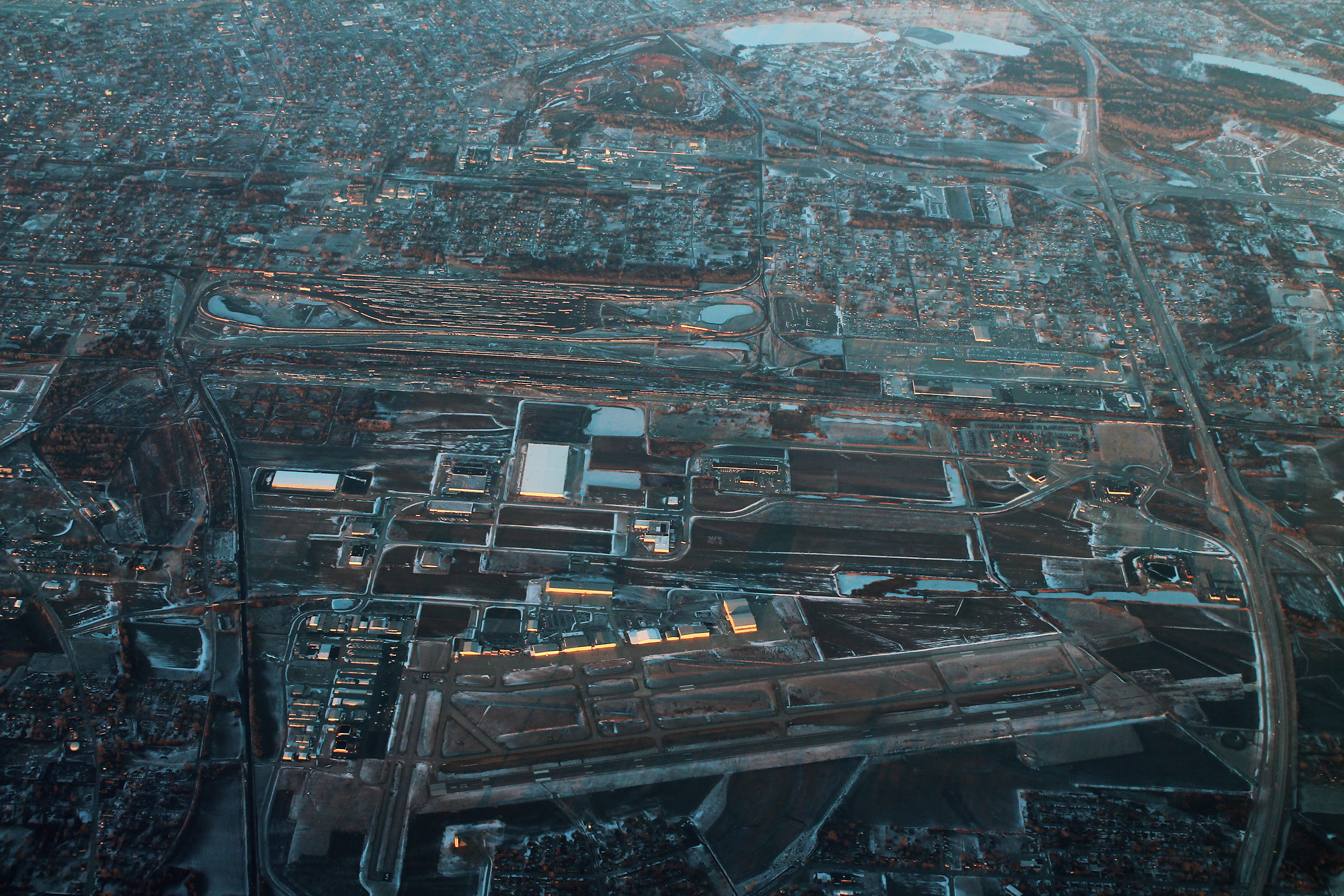
- IATA: CPS; ICAO: KCPS; FAA LID: CPS

Summary
- Airport type: Public
- Owner: Bi-State Development Agency
- Serves: Greater St. Louis
- Location: Cahokia Heights, Illinois
- Elevation AMSL: 413 ft (126 m)
- Coordinates: 38°34′15″N 90°09′22″W
- Website: StLouisDowntownAirport.com

Map
- Location of airport in Illinois CPS (the United States)

Runways
Direction	Length		Surface
Direction	ft	m	Surface
12R/30L	7,001	2,133	Asphalt
12L/30R	5,300	1,615	Concrete
5/23	2,799	853	Asphalt

Statistics (2021)
- Aircraft operations: 101,000
- Based aircraft: 111
- Source: Federal Aviation Administration

St. Louis Downtown Airport (IATA: CPS, ICAO: KCPS, FAA LID: CPS) is a public-use airport located in Greater St. Louis, one mile (2 km) east of the central business district of Cahokia Heights (formerly Cahokia), in St. Clair County, Illinois, United States. It is owned by the Bi-State Development Agency. The airport is located less than 3 miles from the Gateway Arch riverfront in St. Louis and is used by many business aircraft visiting the St. Louis region. Airport services include one full-service 24-hour fixed-base operator, an instrument landing system, an FAA air traffic control tower, and its own dedicated Index B aircraft rescue and firefighting (ARFF) service. It is utilized mainly by Saint Louis University's Parks College of Engineering, Aviation and Technology for training purposes, as well as the St. Louis Cardinals for charter flights to away games.

The St. Louis metropolitan area is also served by St. Louis Lambert International Airport in St. Louis County, Missouri; MidAmerica St. Louis Airport in Belleville, Illinois; St. Louis Regional Airport in Bethalto, Illinois; and Spirit of St. Louis Airport in Chesterfield, Missouri.

== History ==
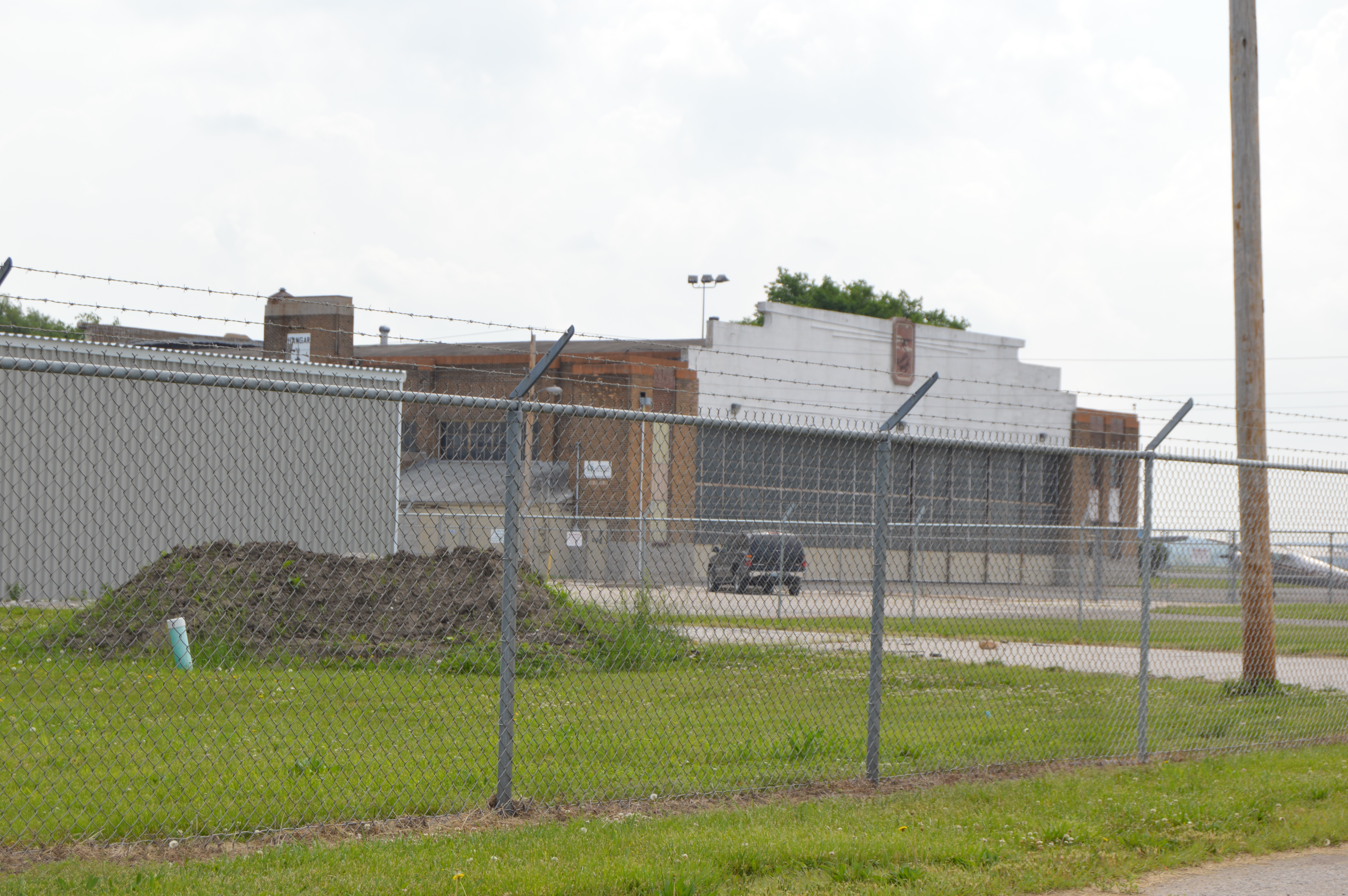
One of the Curtiss-Wright hangars

The airport opened in 1929 as Curtiss-Steinberg Airport. In 1940 it was renamed Curtiss-Parks Airport, followed by Parks Metropolitan Airport later that same year.

Taken over by the United States Army Air Forces on 1 August 1939 as a basic (level 1) pilot training airfield. Assigned to USAAF Gulf Coast Training Center (later Central Flying Training Command). Parks Air College conducted contract basic flying training. Flying training was performed with Fairchild PT-19s as the primary trainer with also several PT-17 Stearmans and a few P-40 Warhawks assigned. The military airfield was inactivated 12 March 1944 with the drawdown of AAFTC's pilot training program.

The airport closed in 1959 and reopened six years later as Bi-State Parks Airport. It was renamed St. Louis Downtown-Parks Airport in 1984 and received its current name in 1999.

The two survivors of the airport's original four hangars, Hangar 1 and Hangar 2, are listed on the National Register of Historic Places.

== Facilities and aircraft ==
St. Louis Downtown Airport covers an area of 1,013 acres (410 ha) which contains three paved runways: 12R/30L measuring 7,002 x 150 ft. (2,134 x 46 m), 12L/30R measuring 5,301 x 75 ft. (1,616 x 23 m), and 5/23 measuring 2,799 x 75 ft. (853 x 23 m).

For the 12-month period ending December 31, 2021, the airport had 103,000 aircraft operations, an average of 284 per day. This included 88% general aviation, 11% air taxi, and <1% of both commercial and military. This was down from 170,000 annual operations in 2005. In 2021, there were 111 aircraft based at this airport (down from 281 based aircraft in 2005): 77 single-engine and 14 multi-engine airplanes, 13 helicopters, 6 jets, and 1 glider.

Historic Hangar #2 houses the Greater Saint Louis Air & Space Museum. The airport is still home to the nation's oldest flight school, Parks College of Engineering and Aviation's Center for Aerospace Sciences, which holds CAA Flight School Certificate #1.

== Former airline service ==
In 1971, Air Mid-America Airlines was operating scheduled passenger flights from the airport nonstop to Chicago Midway Airport (MDW) and Springfield, IL (SPI) with 40-passenger Convair 600 turboprop airliners.

In 1984, Air Midwest was operating scheduled passenger flights from the airport nonstop to Chicago Midway Airport (MDW) and Kansas City Downtown Airport (MKC) with Swearingen Metro II commuter propjets.

== Ground transportation ==
While no public transit service is provided directly to the airport terminal, the St. Clair County Transit District provides service within walking distance of the airport.

== Accidents and incidents ==
- On January 22, 2018, a helicopter crashed during low flight on a training mission near the airport. Neither the student nor the instructor on board were injured.
- On May 23, 2019, a helicopter crashed while operating at the airport. Neither the student nor the instructor on board were injured.

== See also ==
- Illinois World War II Army Airfields
- 31st Flying Training Wing (World War II)
- List of airports in Illinois
