= Consumer complaint =

Unsatisfied report by a customer

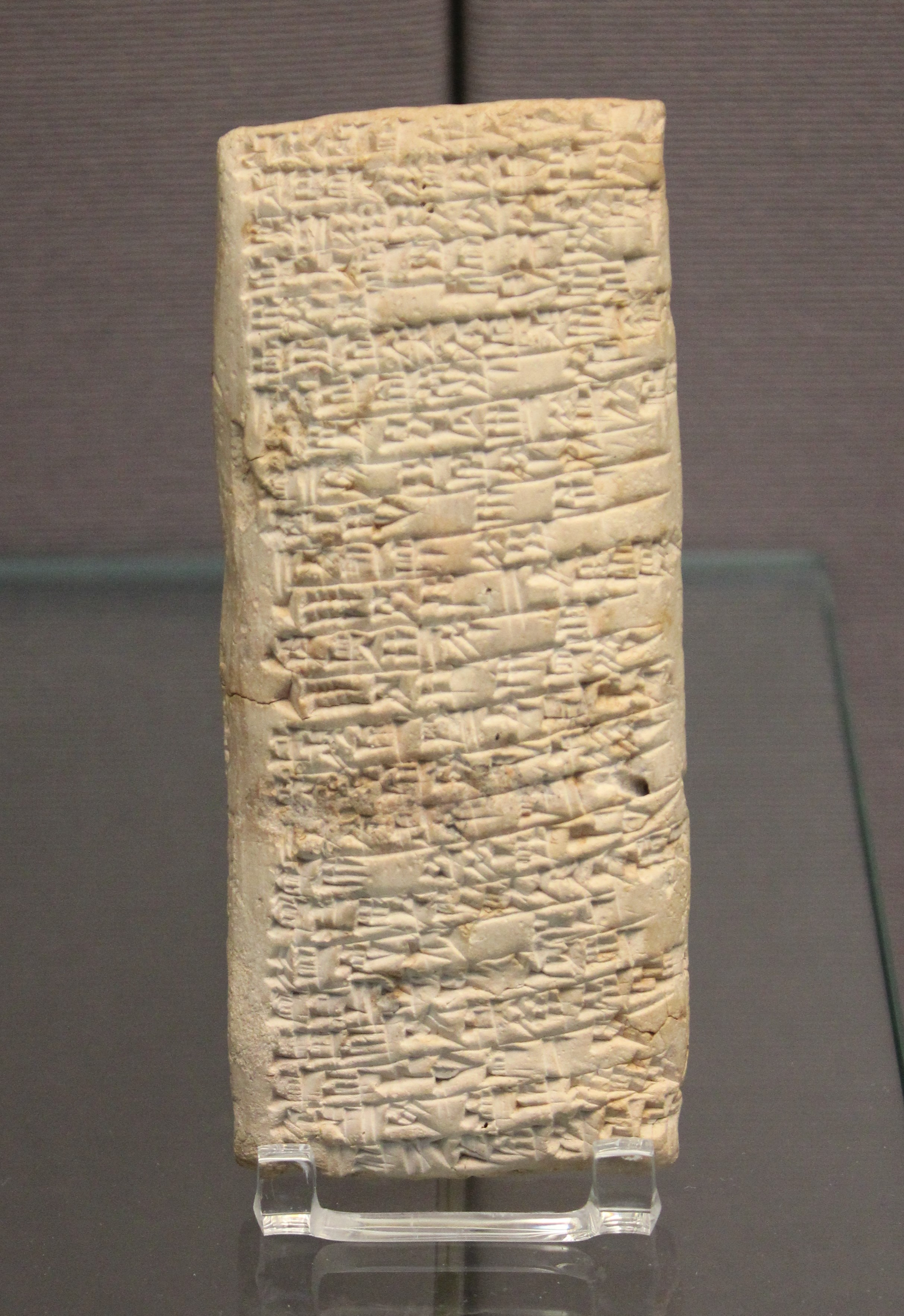
The Complaint tablet to Ea-nāṣir may be the oldest known written customer complaint.

A consumer complaint or customer complaint is an expression of dissatisfaction concerning a product, service, or consumption experience. Consumer complaint behavior may include communicating dissatisfaction directly to a seller, discussing the experience with other consumers, or seeking assistance from a third party.

Consumer complaints are usually informal complaints directly addressed to a company or public service provider, and most consumers manage to resolve problems with products and services but it sometimes requires persistence. An instrumental complaint is a complaint made to a person or organization that could take some action and bring about a specific remedy. An expressive complaint is a complaint made for the purpose of expressing feelings, without any realistic chance of anything being done.

== Classification ==
Marketing research distinguishes between three broad categories of consumer complaint behavior: voice responses directed towards the seller; private responses, such as negative word of mouth or discontinuing purchases; and third-party responses involving external organizations or legal action. These categories describe different responses to dissatisfaction rather than stages that every consumer necessarily follows.

== Complaints to third-parties ==
The grievance is not addressed in a way that satisfies the consumer, the consumer sometimes registers the complaint with a third party such as the Better Business Bureau, a local or regional government (if it has a "consumer protection" office) and Federal Trade Commission (in the United States). These and similar organizations in other countries except for consumer complaints and assist people with customer service issues, as do government representatives like attorneys general.

Consumers however, rarely file complaints in the more formal legal sense, which consists of a formal legal process (see the article on complaint).

In some countries (for example Australia, the United Kingdom, and many countries of the European Community), the making of consumer complaints, particularly regarding the sale of financial services, is governed by statute (law). The statutory authority may require companies to reply to complaints within set time limits, publish written procedures for handling customer dissatisfaction, and provide information about arbitration schemes.

== Online complaints ==
Internet forums and the advent of social media have provided consumers with a new way to submit complaints. Consumer news and advocacy websites often accept and publish complaints. Publishing complaints on highly visible websites increases the likelihood that the general public will become aware of the consumer's complaint. If, for example, a person with many "followers" or "friends" publishes a complaint on social media, it may go "viral". Internet forums in general and on complaint websites have made it possible for individual consumers to hold large corporations accountable in a public forum.

== See also ==
- Airline complaints
- Better Business Bureau
- Consumer protection
- Consumer organization
- Federal Trade Commission
- Ombudsman
