= Air Transportation Stabilization Board =

United States government department

The Air Transportation Stabilization Board (ATSB) is an office of United States Department of the Treasury created to assist US airlines in the wake of the September 11, 2001 attacks.

The Air Transportation Safety and System Stabilization Act, signed into law September 22, 2001, authorizes the board to issue up to $10 billion in federal loan guarantees to air carriers for which credit is not otherwise available and where "such agreement is a necessary part of maintaining a safe, efficient and viable commercial aviation system in the United States."

== Loan guarantees ==
Between 2001 and 2003, the ATSB approved applications for loan guarantees from seven carriers: America West Airlines, US Airways, American Trans Air, Aloha Airlines, Frontier Airlines, Evergreen International Airlines, and World Airways. These carriers accepted loan guarantees worth $1.179 billion. Ultimately, the government benefited from the program, drawing $300 million in profit. The agency was dissolved in 2006.
