= Ea-nāṣir =

Mesopotamian copper merchant of the Bronze Age

- 𒂍𒀀𒈾𒍢𒅕
- Pronunciation: IPA: [e.a naː.t͡s’ir]
- Occupation: Copper merchant in Ur
- Years active: c. 1750 BC
- Organization(s): Alik Tilmun, or "Traders of Dilmun" (guild)
- Known for: Being the addressee of the oldest known written complaint, dated c. 1750 BC

Ea-nāṣir (Note: Old Babylonian Akkadian: 𒂍𒀀𒈾𒍢𒅕, romanized: e₂-a-na-ṣi-ir, lit. 'Ea (is his) watchman', Reconstructed pronunciation: [e.a naː.t͡s’ir]) (fl. c. 1750 BC) was a Mesopotamian copper merchant from Ur during the Bronze Age. He was a member of a guild of traders based in Dilmun, procuring copper ingots originating in Magan, and was active during the 11th and 19th regnal years of Rim-Sîn I, who ruled Larsa in Sumer.

Information about Ea-nāṣir is known from surviving cuneiform clay tablets he kept pertaining to his business transactions. He is most recognized for being the addressee of complaints from various dissatisfied customers, the most famous of these being a complaint tablet by a customer named Nanni written around 1750 BC (deemed the "oldest written customer complaint" by Guinness World Records), wherein Nanni expresses dissatisfaction with the quality of the ingots Ea-nāṣir provided, and takes offense at how his servant was treated during the transaction.

== Life and business activity ==
Babylonian house in Ur, probable residence of Ea-nāṣir. 1: Entrances 2: Main courtyard 3: Stairwell 4: Toilet 5: Reception or living room 6: Chapel or living room

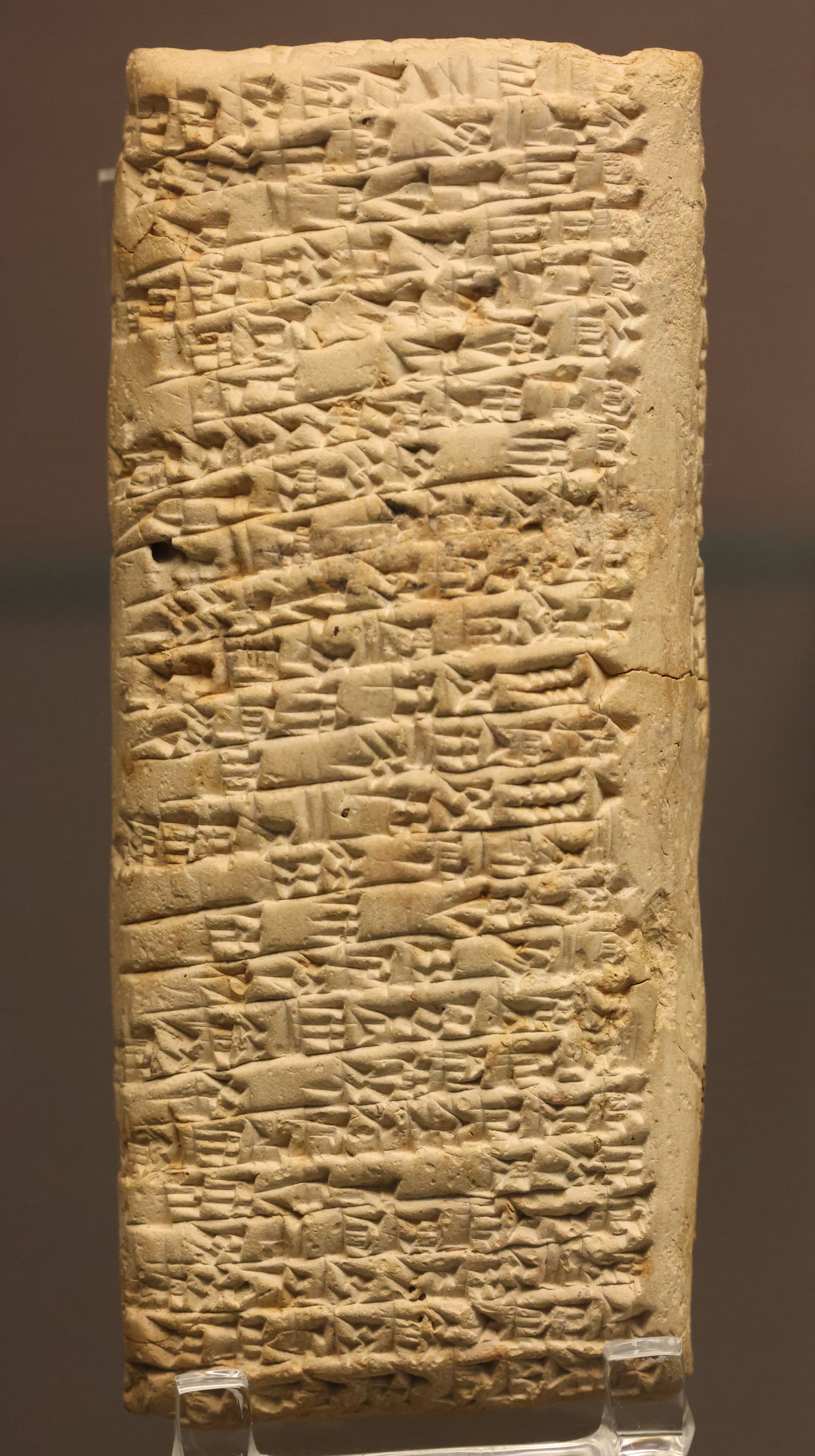
The complaint tablet from Nanni to Ea-nāṣir in the British Museum

Wilhelmus F. Leemans describes Ea-nāṣir in his 1960 publication, based on the clay tablets found in Ea-nāṣir's probable residence in Ur, as a prominent wholesale merchant who purchased copper in Dilmun and shipped it by waterway to Ur for resale to various traders. Ea-nāṣir is believed to have spent extended periods in Dilmun, where he received orders and complaints from Ur, which he brought back with him upon his return. According to Leemans, Ea-nāṣir's main business was likely the direct import of copper for the palace of Ur. His greater interest in this palace-related activity is seen as a possible reason why he paid less attention to his private business relationships. Among Ea-nāṣir's clients was the copper trader Nanni. In addition to copper ingots, Ea-nāṣir also traded in copper products and occasionally in textiles and foodstuffs or, according to Michael Rice, "anything in which he could see an opportunity for profit."

What is thought to have been Ea-nāṣir's house was given the address of "Number 1 Old Street" by the excavation team. Like the other houses in the area, it was built from mud brick. It included its own chapel.

Ea-nāṣir's creditworthiness appears to have declined over time. Leemans notes that in their letters, customers Nanni and Arbituram do not begin their letters addressing Ea-nāṣir with the traditional blessing and "consequently, [do] not observe much reverence towards him". In addition to the increasing number of "reminder letters" addressed to Ea-nāṣir during his career, other findings from the excavations by Leonard Woolley suggest that Ea-nāṣir was ultimately forced to live in more modest circumstances. Part of his house in Ur was apparently separated and merged with a neighbor's house during Ea-nāṣir's lifetime. It is however possible that instead this was a division that took place after Ea-nāṣir's death.

== Tablets ==
Of the preserved Akkadian clay tablets used for correspondence that give information on Ea-nāṣir's life and trade, a significant amount of them are dedicated to complaints from customers. In The Archaeology of the Arabian Gulf, Michael Rice writes that the letters to Ea-nāṣir "gleam mischievously" amidst a mass of tedious but historically significant clay tablets of business correspondence, and that the tone of injured surprise and reproach found in many of them would be familiar to some modern debtors as well.

=== Nanni's complaint tablet ===
The most famous of Ea-nāṣir's business tablets is the angry letter from a customer named Nanni, who was likely a local copper trader in Ur relying on Ea-nāṣir to procure the copper for him from Dilmun, dated around 1750 BC. According to Nanni's complaint tablet, Nanni entrusted Ea-nāṣir with money in advance for the purposes of acquiring an agreed-upon amount of copper of sufficient quality. However, when Nanni sent a servant through hostile territory to acquire the ingots from Ea-nāṣir, he presented Nanni's servant with poor-quality ingots while mistreating and undermining him, and stated the equivalent of "take it or leave it" in a dismissive manner. Nanni claimed that Ea-nāṣir had ignored his previous letters, and that his messengers had already returned empty-handed several times. Enraged, Nanni wrote:

Who do you think you are, treating someone like me with such contempt? […] Is there anyone else among the traders who deal with Dilmun who has treated me this way? Only you treat my messenger with contempt! […] Be advised that I will no longer accept any copper from you that is not of good quality. From now on, I will personally select the ingots in my own yard, and I will exercise my right of refusal against you, since you have treated me with contempt.

— According to the 1967 English translation by Adolf Leo Oppenheim (Note: There exist several other translations of this tablet, including one by Leemans and an earlier 1954 one by Oppenheim.)

The clay tablet with Nanni's complaint was found by Leonard Woolley in Ur in 1953. It is since then housed at the British Museum.

=== Other tablets ===
Other complaint tablets have been found in the ruins that are believed to have been Ea-nāṣir's house. These include multiple from a man named Arbituram, who complained that he had not received his copper yet and later that his middleman had not received it, while another tablet's author complained that he was tired of repeatedly receiving low-grade copper. Other correspondents named, Appa, Ilsu-ellatsu, and Ili-idinnam also lodged complaints with Ea-nāṣir by name.

== In popular culture ==
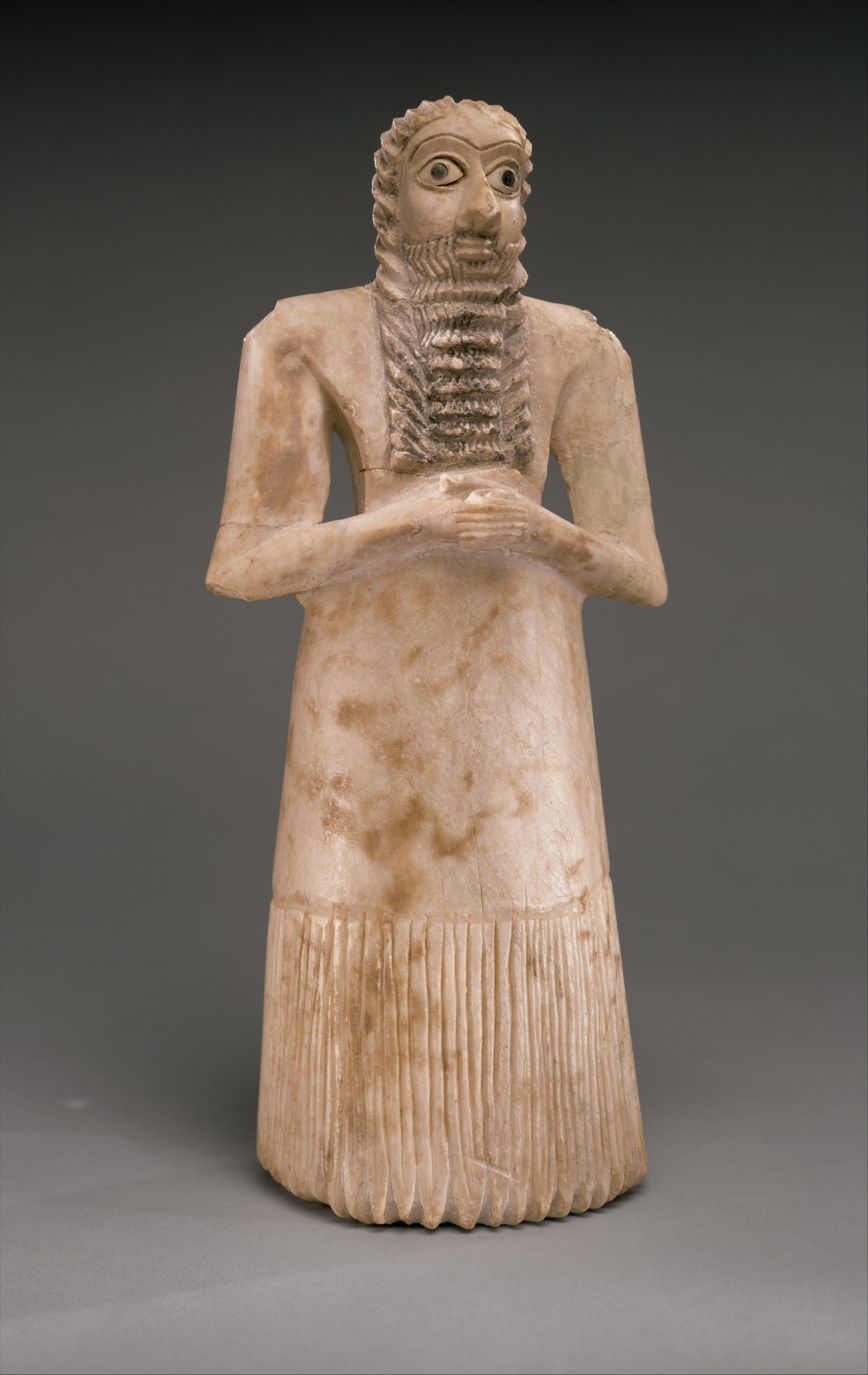
This statue of an unknown worshipper is often used to represent Ea-nāṣir in modern day popular culture.

Around 2015, the customer–merchant exchange preserved by the tablet and Ea-nāṣir's rhetoric rose to prominence as the subject of several internet memes on Reddit, Tumblr, and other online platforms. His collection of customer complaints has led to him being portrayed as a trickster character.

Since Ea-nāṣir's emergence in popular culture, a statue of an unknown Mesopotamian worshipper from the Tell Asmar Hoard has commonly been used to depict Ea-nāṣir. However, the statue is older than Ea-nāṣir by approximately a thousand years.

== Sources ==
- Leemans, W. F. (1960). "Ur: Time of Rim-Sin". Foreign Trade in the Old Babylonian Period as Revealed by Texts from Southern Mesopotamia. Studia et Documenta ad Iura Orientis Antiqui Pertinentia. Vol. 6. Leiden: Brill. pp. 36–55. LCCN a61001806.
- Oppenheim, Adolf Leo (1967). Letters From Mesopotamia. Official, Business, and Private Letters on Clay Tablets from Two Millennia. The University of Chicago Press.
- Rice, Michael (2011) [1994]. The Archaeology of the Arabian Gulf. Routledge. ISBN 9780415513197.
- "tablet". British Museum.
- The Legend of Ea-Naṣir - How a Babylonian Businessman Became an Internet Meme, by Gabriel Moshenska - PDF article
