= Airline =

Company that provides air transport services for passengers and freight

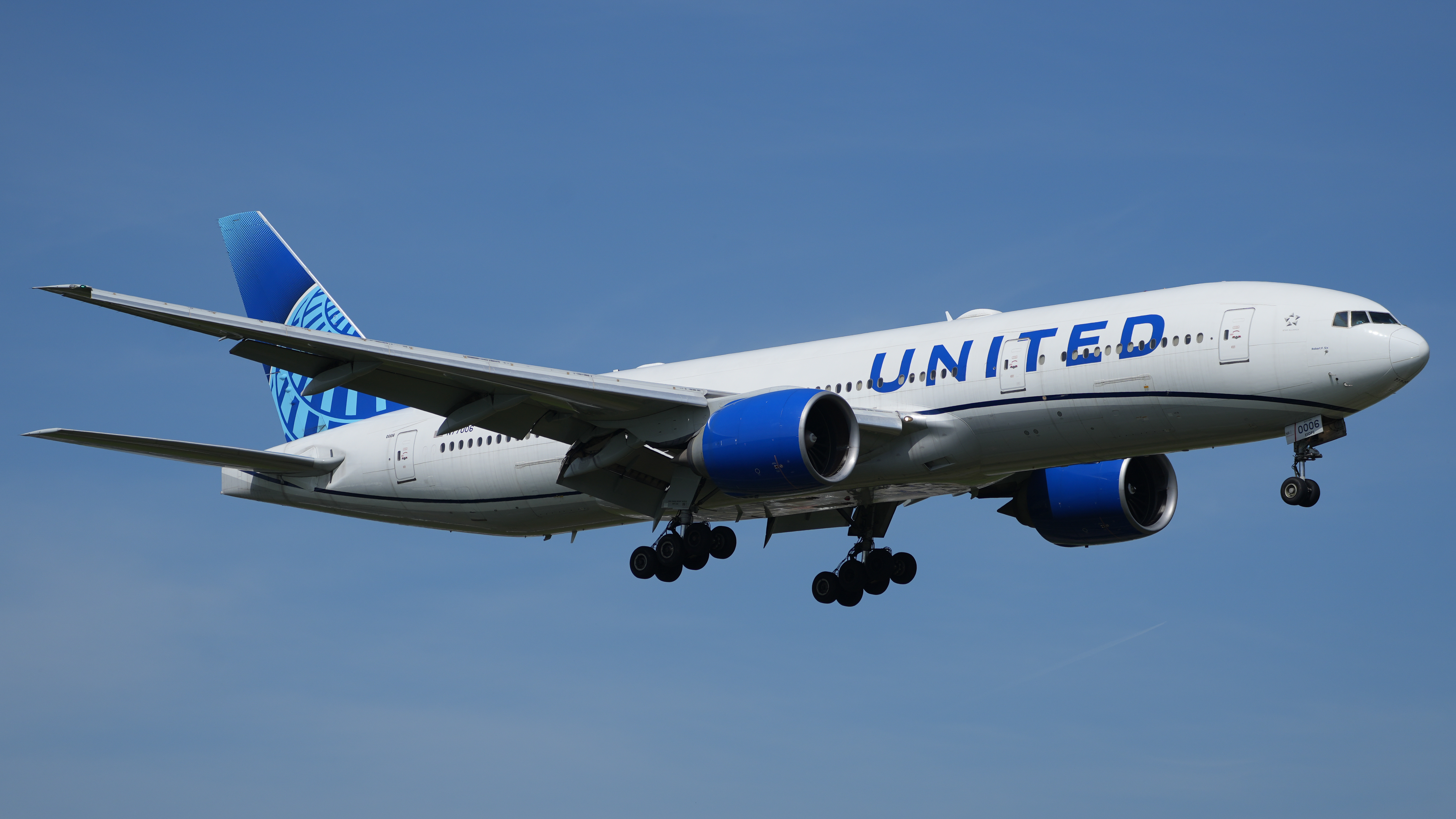
A Boeing 777 of United Airlines, the 2nd largest airline in the world by fleet size.

Air trips per capita

An airline is a company that provides a regular service of air transportation for passengers or freight (cargo). Airlines use aircraft to supply these services. Many passenger airlines also carry cargo in the belly of their aircraft, while dedicated cargo airlines focus solely on freight transport. Generally, airlines are recognized with an air operating certificate or license issued by a governmental aviation body. These airlines may be scheduled or charter operators.

Airline ownership has seen a shift from mostly personal ownership until the 1930s to government-ownership of major airlines from the 1940s to 1980s and back to large-scale privatization following the mid-1980s. Since the 1980s, there has been a trend of major airline mergers and the formation of partnerships or alliances for codeshare agreements, in which they both offer and operate the same flight. The largest alliances are Star Alliance, SkyTeam and Oneworld. Airline alliances coordinate their passenger service programs (such as lounges and frequent-flyer programs), offer special interline tickets and often engage in extensive codesharing (sometimes systemwide).

== History ==
=== The first airlines ===
DELAG, Deutsche Luftschiffahrts-Aktiengesellschaft, was the world’s first commercial passenger airline. It was founded on November 16, 1909, and began services in June 1910, providing a regular service until 1935. DELAG operated airships manufactured by the Zeppelin Company.

The Compagnie générale transaérienne (CGT) was founded on October 10, 1909, making it the oldest airline company, which began cargo operations in April 1911 and began regular passenger operations in March 1913—weekly return fixed-wing flights. CGT was the first of the companies that eventually merged to become Air France.

A fixed-wing scheduled airline was started in the United States in January 1914. The St. Petersburg–Tampa Airboat Line was piloted by Tony Jannus and flew from St. Petersburg, Florida, to Tampa, Florida.

=== Europe ===
==== Beginnings ====
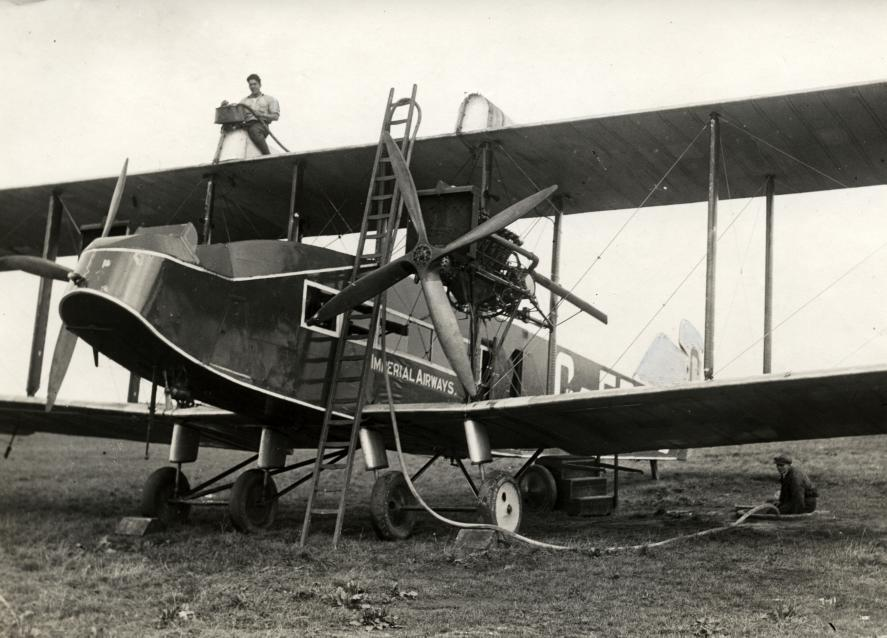
The Handley Page W.8b was used by Handley Page Transport, an early British airline established in 1919.

The British airship, HM Airship R34 was the first aircraft of any type to carry passengers across the Atlantic Ocean when on 2 July 1919 it left Scotland, travelled to New York and returned.

Aircraft Transport and Travel (AT&T), formed by George Holt Thomas in 1916 as a fixed-wing airline; via a series of takeovers and mergers, this company is the earliest predecessor company of British Airways. Using a fleet of former military Airco DH.4A biplanes that had been modified to carry two passengers in the fuselage, it operated relief flights between Folkestone and Ghent, Belgium. On July 15, 1919, the company flew a proving flight across the English Channel, despite a lack of support from the British government. Flown by Lt. H Shaw in an Airco DH.9 between RAF Hendon and Paris – Le Bourget Airport, the flight took 2 hours and 30 minutes at £21 per passenger. On August 25, 1919, the company used DH.16s to pioneer a regular service from Hounslow Heath Aerodrome to Paris's Le Bourget, the first daily international service in the world. The airline soon gained a reputation for reliability, despite problems with bad weather, and began to attract European competition. In November 1919, it won the first British civil airmail contract. Six Royal Air Force Airco DH.9A aircraft were lent to the company, to operate the airmail service between Hawkinge and Cologne. In 1920, they were returned to the Royal Air Force.

Other British competitors were quick to follow – Handley Page Transport was established in 1919 and used the company's converted wartime Type O/400 bombers with a capacity for 12 passengers, to run a London-Paris passenger service.

Société des lignes Latécoère, a predecessor of Air France, later known as Aéropostale, started its first airmail service in late 1924 to Spain. The Société Générale des Transports Aériens was created in late 1919, by the Farman brothers. It began a weekly service between Paris and Brussels on 22 March 1919, the world's first international commercial aviation service. The Farman F.60 Goliath plane flew scheduled services from Toussus-le-Noble to Kenley, near Croydon, England. Another early French airline was the Compagnie des Messageries Aériennes, established in 1919 by Louis-Charles Breguet, offering a mail and freight service between Le Bourget Airport, Paris and Lesquin Airport, Lille.

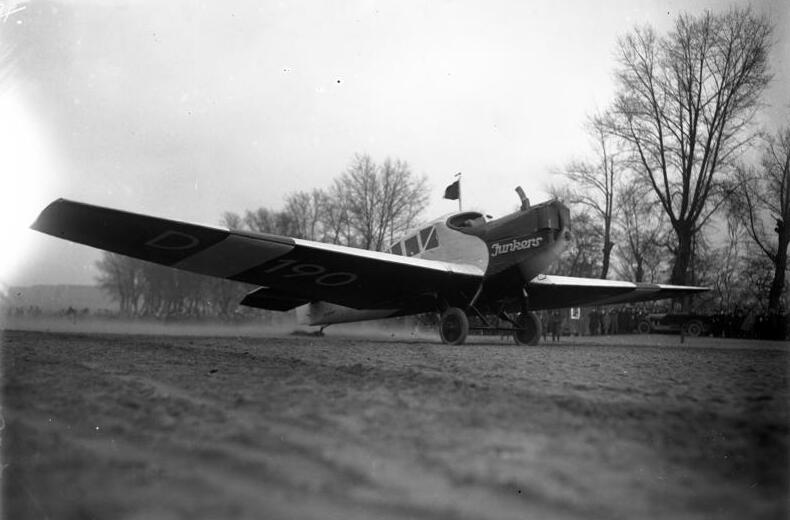
Junkers F.13 D-190 of Junkers Luftverkehr

The first German airline to use heavier than air aircraft was Deutsche Luft-Reederei (DLR) established in 1917 which started operating in February 1919. In its first year, the DLR operated regularly scheduled flights on routes with a combined length of nearly 1000 miles. By 1921 the DLR network was more than 3000 km (1865 miles) long, and included destinations in the Netherlands, Scandinavia and the Baltic Republics. Another important German airline was Junkers Luftverkehr, which began operations in 1921. It was a division of the aircraft manufacturer Junkers, which became a separate company in 1924. It operated joint-venture airlines in Austria, Denmark, Estonia, Finland, Hungary, Latvia, Norway, Poland, Sweden and Switzerland.

The Dutch airline KLM made its first flight in 1920, and is the oldest airline still using the original name. Established by aviator Albert Plesman, it was immediately awarded a "Royal" predicate from Queen Wilhelmina. Its first flight was from Croydon Airport, London to Amsterdam, using a leased DH-16 from Aircraft Transport and Travel, carrying two British journalists and a number of newspapers. In 1921, KLM started scheduled services.

In Finland, the charter establishing Aero O/Y (now Finnair) was signed in the city of Helsinki on 12 September 1923. Junkers F.13 D-335 became the first aircraft of the company, when Aero took delivery of it on 14 March 1924. The first flight was between Helsinki and Tallinn, capital of Estonia, and it took place on 20 March 1924, one week later.

In the Soviet Union, the Chief Administration of the Civil Air Fleet was established in 1921. One of its first acts was to help found Deutsch-Russische Luftverkehrs A.G. (Deruluft), a German-Russian joint venture to provide air transport from Russia to the West. Domestic air service began around the same time, when Dobrolyot started operations on 15 July 1923 between Moscow and Nizhni Novgorod. Since 1932 all operations had been carried under the name Aeroflot.

Early European airlines tended to favor comfort – the passenger cabins were often spacious with luxurious interiors – over speed and efficiency. The relatively basic navigational capabilities of pilots at the time also meant that delays due to weather were commonplace.

==== Rationalization ====
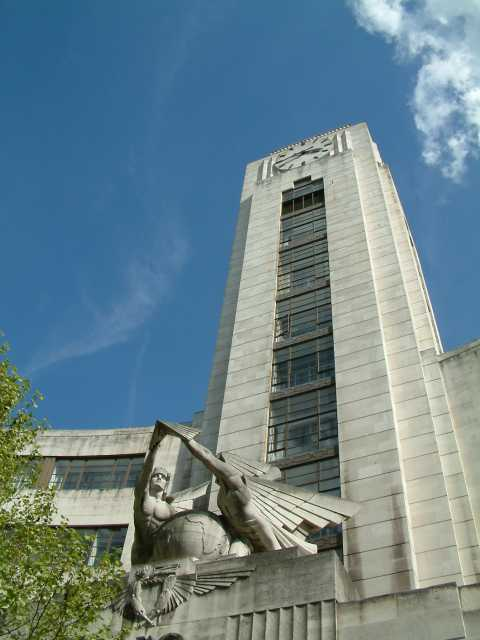
The Imperial Airways Empire Terminal, Victoria, London. Trains ran from here to flying boats in Southampton, and to Croydon Airport.

By the early 1920s, small airlines were struggling to compete, and there was a movement towards increased rationalization and consolidation. In 1924, Imperial Airways was formed from the merger of Instone Air Line Company, British Marine Air Navigation, Daimler Airway and Handley Page Transport, to allow British airlines to compete with stiff competition from French and German airlines that were enjoying heavy government subsidies. The airline was a pioneer in surveying and opening up air routes across the world to serve far-flung parts of the British Empire and to enhance trade and integration.

The first new airliner ordered by Imperial Airways, was the Handley Page W8f City of Washington, delivered on 3 November 1924. In the first year of operation the company carried 11,395 passengers and 212,380 letters. In April 1925, the film The Lost World became the first film to be screened for passengers on a scheduled airliner flight when it was shown on the London-Paris route.

Two French airlines also merged to form Air Union on 1 January 1923. This later merged with four other French airlines to become Air France, the country's flagship carrier to this day, on 17 May 1933.

On 6 January 1926 two German airlines, Deutsche Aero Lloyd (DAL) and Junkers Luftverkehr merged to form Deutsche Luft Hansa Aktiengesellschaft. In 1933 The airline simplified its name to Deutsche Lufthansa. Lufthansa, due to the Junkers heritage and unlike most other airlines at the time, became a major investor in airlines outside of Europe, providing capital to Varig and Avianca. Post-war transport aircraft designed by Germans Junkers, Dornier, and Dutch Anthony Fokker were among the most successful in the world, at the time, due to their cantilevered wings eliminating the need for external struts or braces.

==== Expansion ====
In 1926, Alan Cobham surveyed a flight route from the UK to Cape Town, South Africa, following this up with another proving flight to Melbourne, Australia. Other routes to British India and the Far East were also charted and demonstrated at this time. Regular services to Cairo and Basra began in 1927 and were extended to Karachi in 1929. The London-Australia service was inaugurated in 1932 with the Handley Page HP 42 airliners. Further services were opened up to Calcutta, Rangoon, Singapore, Brisbane and Hong Kong passengers departed London on 14 March 1936 following the establishment of a branch from Penang to Hong Kong.

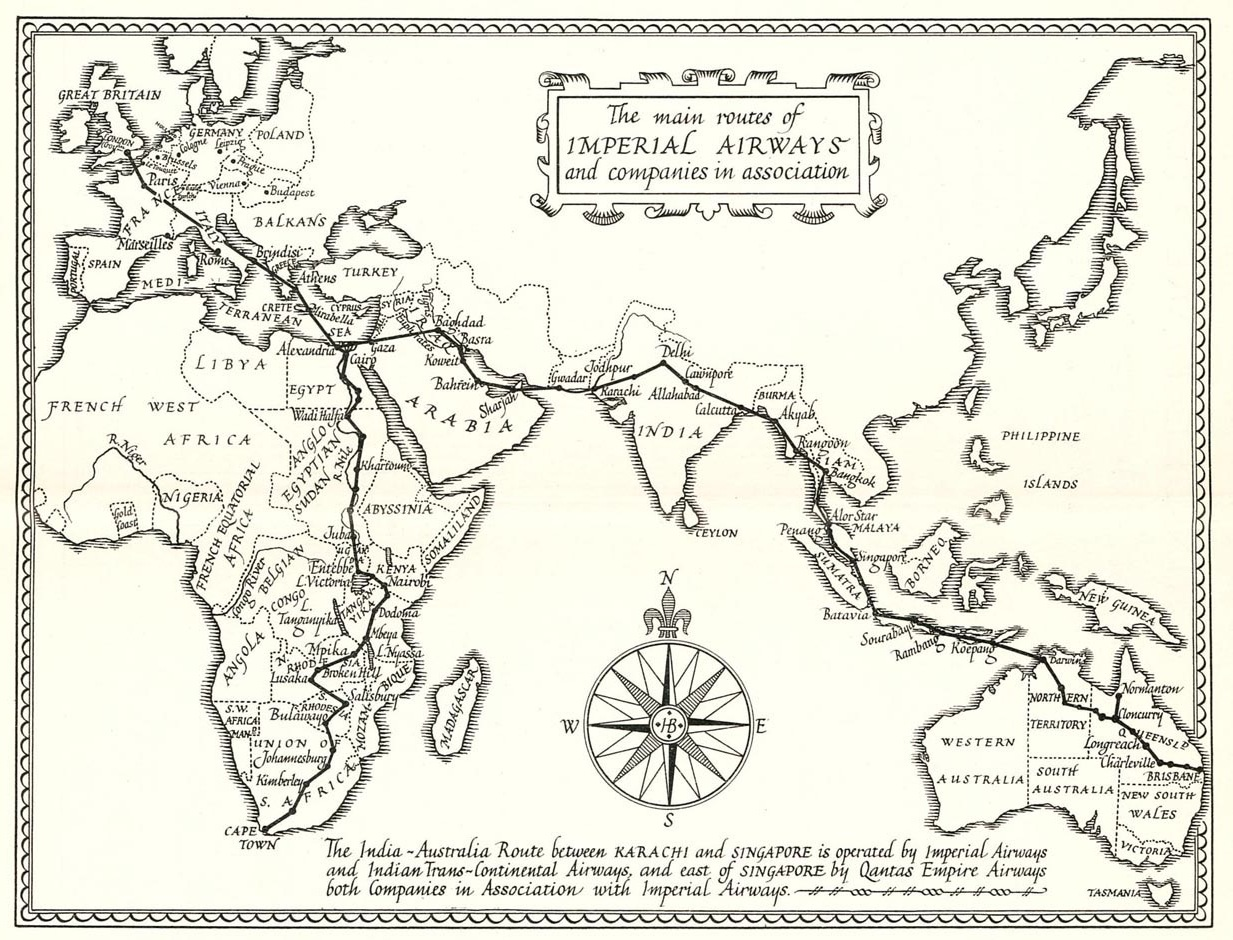
April 1935 map showing Imperial Airways' routes from the UK to Australia and South Africa

France began an air mail service to Morocco in 1919 that was bought out in 1927, renamed Aéropostale, and injected with capital to become a major international carrier. In 1933, Aéropostale went bankrupt, was nationalized and merged into Air France.

Although Germany lacked colonies, it also began expanding its services globally. In 1931, the airship Graf Zeppelin began offering regular scheduled passenger service between Germany and South America, usually every two weeks, which continued until 1937. In 1936, the airship Hindenburg entered passenger service and successfully crossed the Atlantic 36 times before crashing at Lakehurst, New Jersey, on 6 May 1937. In 1938, a weekly air service from Berlin to Kabul, Afghanistan, started operating.

From February 1934 until World War II began in 1939, Deutsche Lufthansa operated an airmail service from Stuttgart, Germany via Spain, the Canary Islands and West Africa to Natal in Brazil. This was the first time an airline flew across an ocean.

By the end of the 1930s Aeroflot had become the world's largest airline, employing more than 4,000 pilots and 60,000 other service personnel and operating around 3,000 aircraft (of which 75% were considered obsolete by its own standards). During the Soviet era Aeroflot was synonymous with Russian civil aviation, as it was the only air carrier. It became the first airline in the world to operate sustained regular jet services on 15 September 1956 with the Tupolev Tu-104.

==== Deregulation ====
Deregulation of the European Union airspace in the early 1990s has had substantial effect on the structure of the industry there. The shift towards 'budget' airlines on shorter routes has been significant. Airlines such as EasyJet and Ryanair have often grown at the expense of the traditional national airlines.

There has also been a trend for these national airlines themselves to be privatized such as has occurred for Aer Lingus and British Airways. Other national airlines, including Italy's Alitalia, suffered – particularly with the rapid increase of oil prices in early 2008.

=== United States ===
==== Early development ====
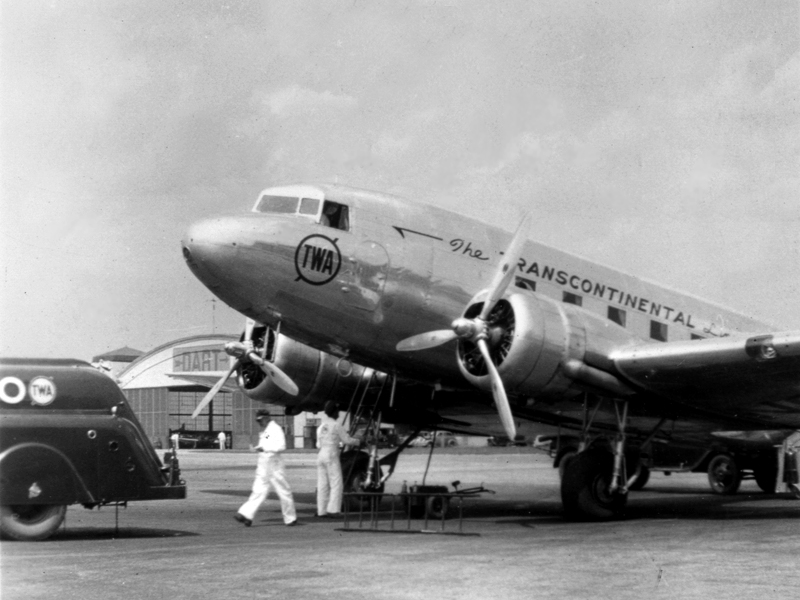
TWA Douglas DC-3 in 1940. The DC-3, often regarded as one of the most influential aircraft in the history of commercial aviation, revolutionized air travel.

Tony Jannus conducted the United States' first scheduled commercial airline flight on January 1, 1914, for the St. Petersburg-Tampa Airboat Line. The 23-minute flight traveled between St. Petersburg, Florida and Tampa, Florida, passing some 50 feet (15 m) above Tampa Bay in Jannus' Benoist XIV wood and muslin biplane flying boat. His passenger was a former mayor of St. Petersburg, who paid $400 for the privilege of sitting on a wooden bench in the open cockpit. The Airboat line operated for about four months, carrying more than 1,200 passengers who paid $5 each. Chalk's International Airlines claimed to have begun a service between Miami and Bimini in the Bahamas in February 1919. Based in Ft. Lauderdale, Chalk's claimed to be the oldest continuously operating airline in the United States until its closure in 2008.

Following World War I, the United States found itself swamped with aviators. Many decided to take their war-surplus aircraft on barnstorming campaigns, performing aerobatic maneuvers to woo crowds. In 1918, the United States Post Office Department won the financial backing of Congress to begin experimenting with air mail service, initially using Curtiss Jenny aircraft that had been procured by the United States Army Air Service. Private operators were the first to fly the mail but due to numerous accidents the US Army was tasked with mail delivery. During the Army's involvement they proved to be too unreliable and lost their air mail duties. By the mid-1920s, the Post Office had developed its own air mail network, based on a transcontinental backbone between New York City and San Francisco. To supplement this service, they offered twelve contracts for spur routes to independent bidders. Some of the carriers that won these routes would, through time and mergers, evolve into Pan Am, Delta Air Lines, Braniff Airways, American Airlines, United Airlines (originally a division of Boeing), Trans World Airlines, Northwest Airlines, and Eastern Air Lines.

Service during the early 1920s was sporadic: most airlines at the time were focused on carrying bags of mail. In 1925, however, the Ford Motor Company bought out the Stout Aircraft Company and began construction of the all-metal Ford Trimotor, which became the first successful American airliner. With a 12-passenger capacity, the Trimotor made passenger service potentially profitable. Air service was seen as a supplement to rail service in the American transportation network.

At the same time, Juan Trippe began a crusade to create an air network that would link America to the world, and he achieved this goal through his airline, Pan Am, with a fleet of flying boats that linked Los Angeles to Shanghai and Boston to London. Pan Am and Northwest Airways (which began flights to Canada in the 1920s) were the only U.S. airlines to go international before the 1940s.

With the introduction of the Boeing 247 and Douglas DC-3 in the 1930s, the U.S. airline industry was generally profitable, even during the Great Depression. This trend continued until the beginning of World War II.

==== Since 1945 ====
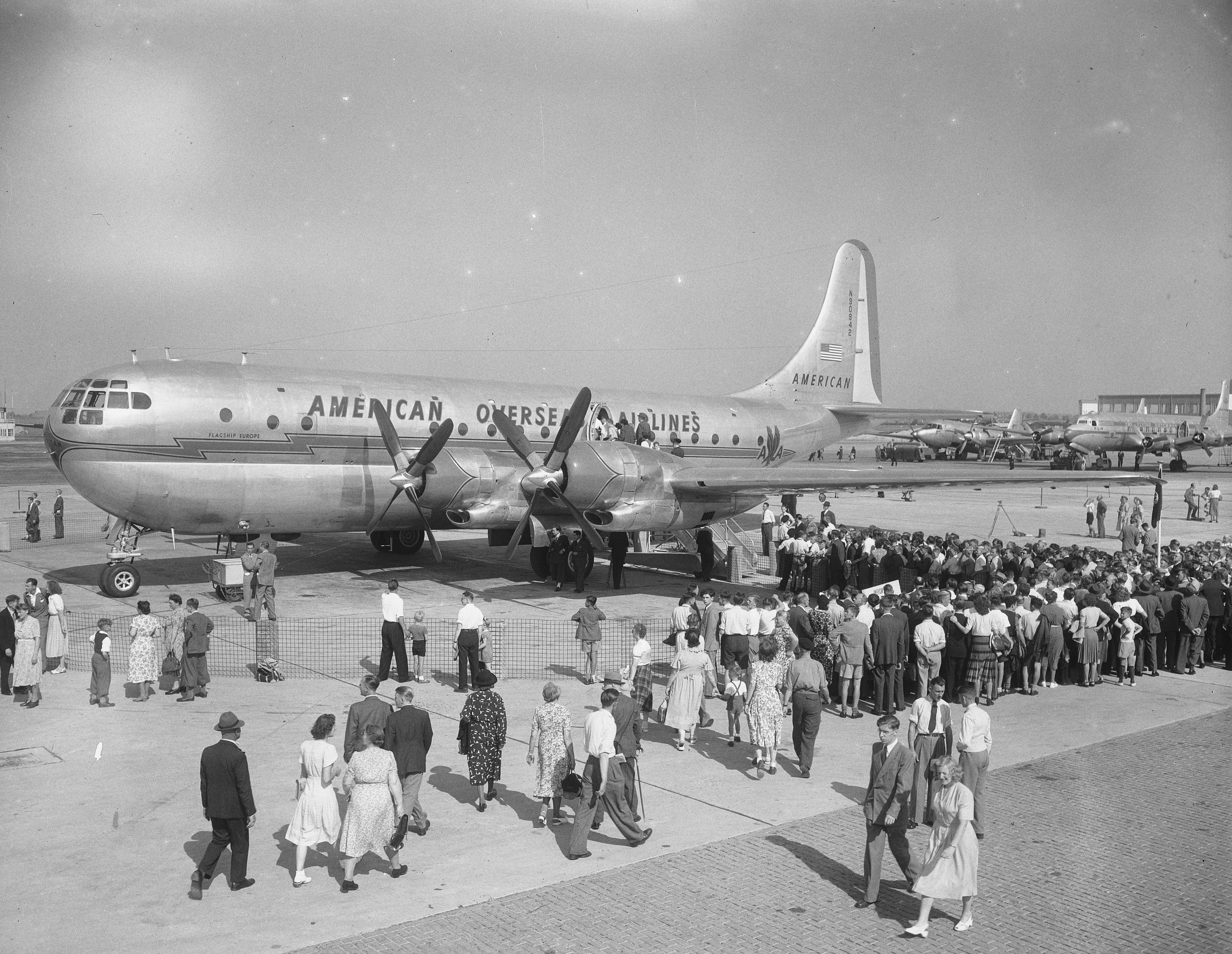
Boeing 377 of American Export Airlines, the first airline to offer landplane flights across the North Atlantic in October 1945.

World War II, like World War I, brought new life to the airline industry. Many airlines in the Allied countries were flush from lease contracts to the military, and foresaw a future explosive demand for civil air transport, for both passengers and cargo. They were eager to invest in the newly emerging flagships of air travel such as the Boeing Stratocruiser, Lockheed Constellation, and Douglas DC-6. Most of these new aircraft were based on American bombers such as the B-29, which had spearheaded research into new technologies such as pressurization. Most offered increased efficiency from both added speed and greater payload.

In the 1950s, the De Havilland Comet, Boeing 707, Douglas DC-8, and Sud Aviation Caravelle became the first flagships of the Jet Age in the West, while the Eastern bloc had Tupolev Tu-104 and Tupolev Tu-124 in the fleets of state-owned carriers such as Czechoslovak ČSA, Soviet Aeroflot and East-German Interflug. The Vickers Viscount and Lockheed L-188 Electra inaugurated turboprop transport.

On 4 October 1958, British Overseas Airways Corporation started transatlantic flights between London Heathrow and New York Idlewild with a Comet 4, and Pan Am followed on 26 October with a Boeing 707 service between New York and Paris.

The next big boost for the airlines would come in the 1970s, when the Boeing 747, McDonnell Douglas DC-10, and Lockheed L-1011 inaugurated widebody ("jumbo jet") service, which is still the standard in international travel. The Tupolev Tu-144 and its Western counterpart, Concorde, made supersonic travel a reality. Concorde first flew in 1969 and operated through 2003. In 1972, Airbus began producing Europe's most commercially successful line of airliners to date. The added efficiencies for these aircraft were often not in speed, but in passenger capacity, payload, and range. Airbus also features modern electronic cockpits that were common across their aircraft to enable pilots to fly multiple models with minimal cross-training.

==== Deregulation ====
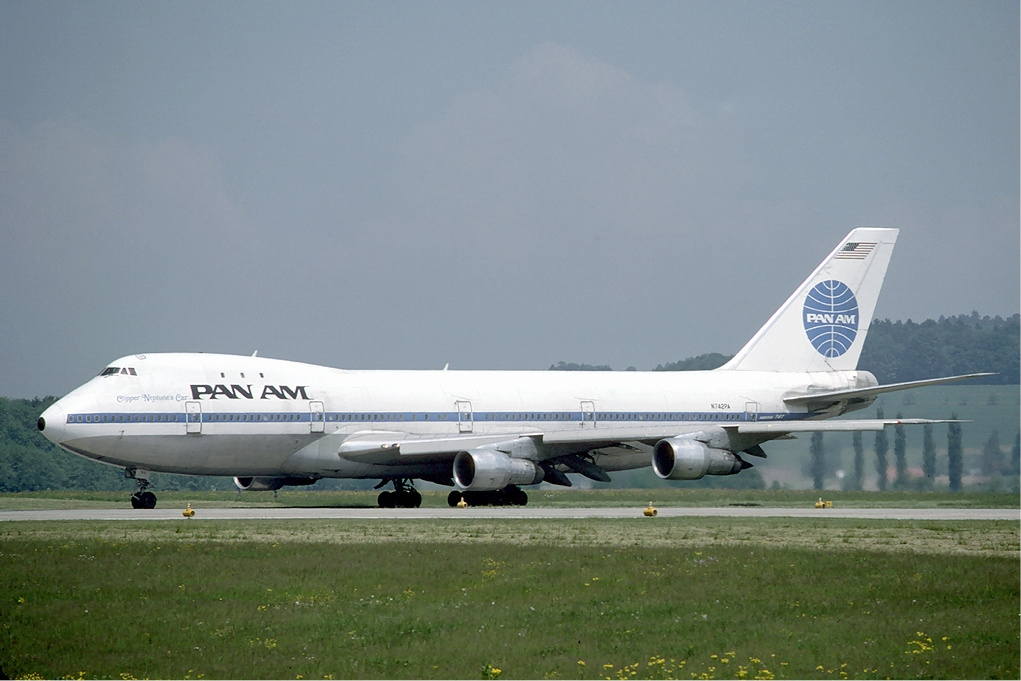
Pan Am Boeing 747 Clipper Neptune's Car in 1985. The deregulation of the American airline industry increased the financial troubles of the airline which ultimately filed for bankruptcy in December 1991.

The 1978 U.S. airline industry deregulation lowered federally controlled barriers for new airlines just as a downturn in the nation's economy occurred. New start-ups entered during the downturn, during which time they found aircraft and funding, contracted hangar and maintenance services, trained new employees, and recruited laid-off staff from other airlines.

Major airlines dominated their routes through aggressive pricing and additional capacity offerings, often swamping new start-ups. In the place of high barriers to entry imposed by regulation, the major airlines implemented an equally high barrier called loss leader pricing. In this strategy an already established and dominant airline stomps out its competition by lowering airfares on specific routes, below the cost of operating on it, choking out any chance a start-up airline may have. The industry side effect is an overall drop in revenue and service quality. Since deregulation in 1978 the average domestic ticket price has dropped by 40%. So has airline employee pay. After incurring massive losses, the airlines of the USA relied upon Chapter 11 bankruptcy proceedings to continue doing business. America West Airlines (which has since merged with US Airways) remained a significant survivor from this new entrant era, as dozens, even hundreds, have gone under.

In many ways, the biggest winner in the deregulated environment was the air passenger. Although not exclusively attributable to deregulation, indeed the U.S. witnessed an explosive growth in demand for air travel. Many millions who had never or rarely flown before became regular fliers, even joining frequent flyer loyalty programs and receiving free flights and other benefits from their flying. New services and higher frequencies meant that business fliers could fly to another city, do business, and return the same day, from almost any point in the country. Air travel's advantages put long-distance intercity railroad travel and bus lines under pressure, with most of the latter having withered away, whilst the former is still protected under nationalization through the continuing existence of Amtrak.

By the 1980s, almost half of the total flying in the world took place in the U.S., and today the domestic industry operates over 10,000 daily departures nationwide.

Toward the end of the century, a new style of low cost airline emerged, offering a no-frills product at a lower price. Southwest Airlines, JetBlue, AirTran Airways, Skybus Airlines and other low-cost carriers began to represent a serious challenge to the so-called "legacy airlines", as did their low-cost counterparts in many other countries. Their commercial viability represented a serious competitive threat to the legacy carriers. However, of these, ATA and Skybus have since ceased operations.

US airlines have been reincorporated and spun off by newly created and internally led management companies, and becoming operating units and subsidiaries with limited financially decisive control. Among some of these holding companies and parent companies include the UAL Corporation, along with the AMR Corporation. Less recognized are the private-equity firms which often seize managerial, financial, and board of directors control of distressed airline companies by temporarily investing large sums of capital in air carriers, to rescheme an airlines assets into a profitable organization or liquidating an air carrier of their profitable and worthwhile routes and business operations.

Thus the last 50 years of the airline industry have varied from reasonably profitable, to devastatingly depressed. As the first major market to deregulate the industry in 1978, U.S. airlines have experienced more turbulence than almost any other country or region. In fact, no U.S. legacy carrier survived bankruptcy-free. Among the outspoken critics of deregulation, former CEO of American Airlines, Robert Crandall has publicly stated: "Chapter 11 bankruptcy protection filing shows airline industry deregulation was a mistake."

==== Bailout ====
Congress passed the Air Transportation Safety and System Stabilization Act (P.L. 107–42) in response to a severe liquidity crisis facing the already-troubled airline industry in the aftermath of the September 11 attacks. Through the ATSB Congress sought to provide cash infusions to carriers for both the cost of the four-day federal shutdown of the airlines and the incremental losses incurred through December 31, 2001, as a result of the terrorist attacks. This resulted in the first government bailout of the 21st century. Between 2000 and 2005 US airlines lost $30 billion with wage cuts of over $15 billion and 100,000 employees laid off.

In recognition of the essential national economic role of a healthy aviation system, Congress authorized partial compensation of up to $5 billion in cash subject to review by the U.S. Department of Transportation and up to $10 billion in loan guarantees subject to review by a newly created Air Transportation Stabilization Board (ATSB). The applications to DOT for reimbursements were subjected to rigorous multi-year reviews not only by DOT program personnel but also by the Government Accountability Office and the DOT Inspector General.

Ultimately, the federal government provided $4.6 billion in one-time, subject-to-income-tax cash payments to 427 U.S. air carriers, with no provision for repayment, essentially a gift from the taxpayers. (Passenger carriers operating scheduled service received approximately $4 billion, subject to tax.) In addition, the ATSB approved loan guarantees to six airlines totaling approximately $1.6 billion. Data from the U.S. Treasury Department show that the government recouped the $1.6 billion and a profit of $339 million from the fees, interest and purchase of discounted airline stock associated with loan guarantees.

As of May 2018 the four largest major carriers controlled 70% of the U.S. passenger market.

=== Asia ===
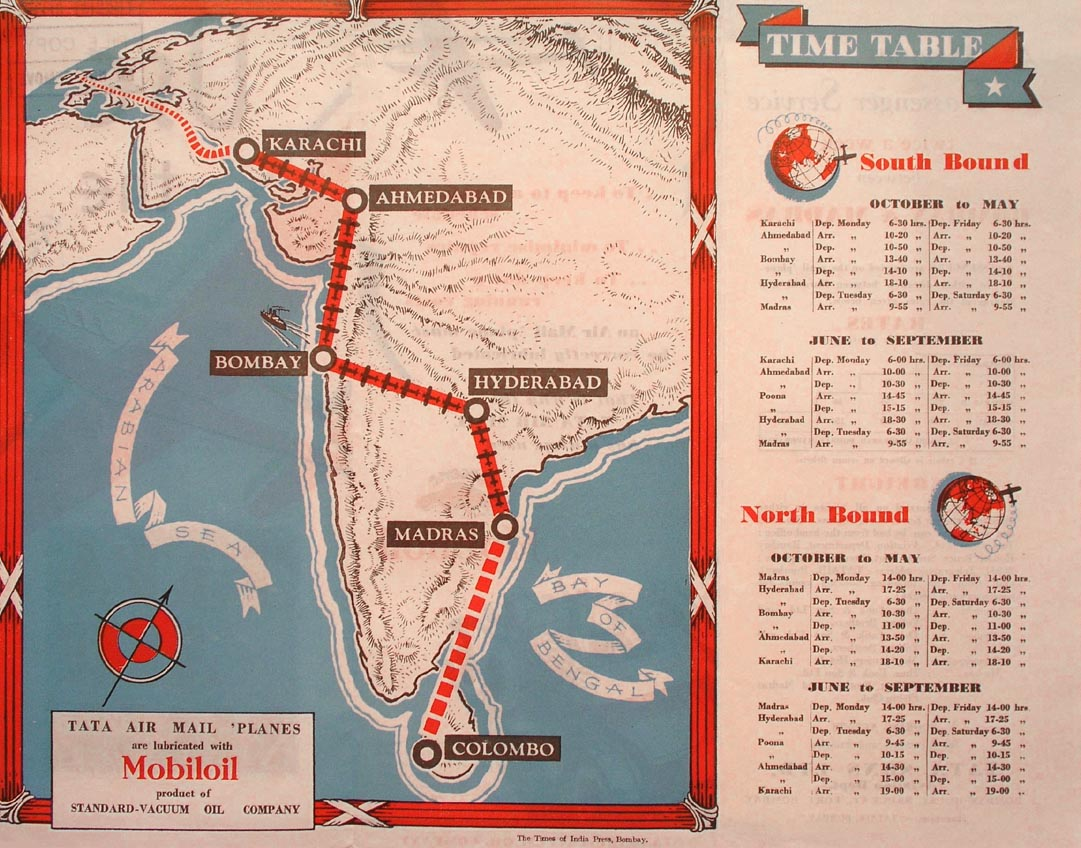
1935 Timetable of Tata Airlines, founded in 1932

Although Philippine Airlines (PAL) was officially founded on February 26, 1941, its license to operate as an airliner was derived from merged Philippine Aerial Taxi Company (PATCO) established by mining magnate Emmanuel N. Bachrach on 3 December 1930, making it Asia's oldest scheduled carrier still in operation. Commercial air service commenced three weeks later from Manila to Baguio, making it Asia's first airline route. Bachrach's death in 1937 paved the way for its eventual merger with Philippine Airlines in March 1941 and made it Asia's oldest airline. It is also the oldest airline in Asia still operating under its current name. Bachrach's majority share in PATCO was bought by beer magnate Andres R. Soriano in 1939 upon the advice of General Douglas MacArthur and later merged with newly formed Philippine Airlines with PAL as the surviving entity. Soriano has controlling interest in both airlines before the merger. PAL restarted service on 15 March 1941, with a single Beech Model 18 NPC-54 aircraft, which started its daily services between Manila (from Nielson Field) and Baguio, later to expand with larger aircraft such as the DC-3 and Vickers Viscount.

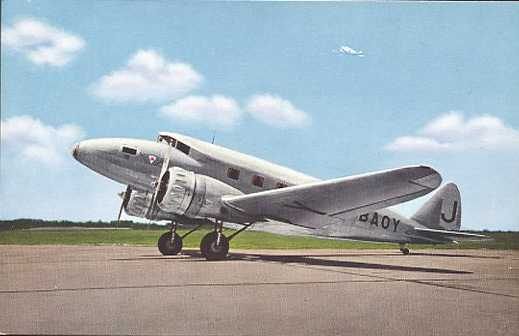
Nakajima AT-2 of Japan Air Transport, 1937

In Japan, Japan Air Transport was established in 1928 as the national flag carrier. Upon the completion of Haneda Airport in 1931, it became the airline's hub. The airline initially operated domestic routes such as Tokyo–Osaka and Osaka–Fukuoka. In September 1929, it opened its first overseas route, which connected Fukuoka to Dalian in the Kwantung Leased Territory via Gyeongseong (present-day Seoul) and Pyongyang in Japanese Korea. After Japan established the puppet state of Manchukuo, the airline opened routes to major cities within this territory. The company was reorganized as Japan Airways in 1938. During the Second World War, it operated routes to various Japanese-occupied territories and Thailand. The company was dissolved immediately after the war, as civil aviation was prohibited by the Allied Occupation Forces. Civil aviation in Japan did not resume until the founding of Japan Airlines in 1951.

Cathay Pacific was one of the first airlines to be launched among the other Asian countries in 1946. The license to operate as an airliner was granted by the federal government body after reviewing the necessity at the national assembly. The Hanjin occupies the largest ownership of Korean Air as well as few low-budget airlines as of now. Korean Air is one of the four founders of SkyTeam, which was established in 2000. Asiana Airlines, launched in 1988, joined Star Alliance in 2003. Korean Air and Asiana Airlines comprise one of the largest combined airline miles and number of passenger served at the regional market of Asian airline industry

India was also one of the first countries to embrace civil aviation. One of the first Asian airline companies was Air India, which was founded as Tata Airlines in 1932, a division of Tata Sons Ltd. (now Tata Group). The airline was founded by India's leading industrialist, JRD Tata. On 15 October 1932, J. R. D. Tata himself flew a single engined De Havilland Puss Moth carrying air mail (postal mail of Imperial Airways) from Karachi to Bombay via Ahmedabad. The aircraft continued to Madras via Bellary piloted by Royal Air Force pilot Nevill Vintcent. Tata Airlines was also one of the world's first major airlines which began its operations without any support from the Government.

With the outbreak of World War II, the airline presence in Asia came to a relative halt, with many new flag carriers donating their aircraft for military aid and other uses. Following the end of the war in 1945, regular commercial service was restored in India and Tata Airlines became a public limited company on 29 July 1946, under the name Air India. After the independence of India, 49% of the airline was acquired by the Government of India. In return, the airline was granted status to operate international services from India as the designated flag carrier under the name Air India International.

On 31 July 1946, a chartered Philippine Airlines (PAL) DC-4 ferried 40 American servicemen to Oakland, California, from Nielson Airport in Makati with stops in Guam, Wake Island, Johnston Atoll and Honolulu, Hawaii, making PAL the first Asian airline to cross the Pacific Ocean. A regular service between Manila and San Francisco was started in December. It was during this year that the airline was designated as the flag carrier of Philippines.

During the era of decolonization, newly born Asian countries started to embrace air transport. Among the first Asian carriers during the era were Cathay Pacific of Hong Kong (founded in September 1946), Orient Airways (later Pakistan International Airlines; founded in October 1946), Air Ceylon (later SriLankan Airlines; founded in 1947), Malayan Airways Limited in 1947 (later Singapore and Malaysia Airlines), El Al in Israel in 1948, Garuda Indonesia in 1949, Thai Airways in 1960, and Korean National Airlines in 1947.

=== Latin America and Caribbean ===
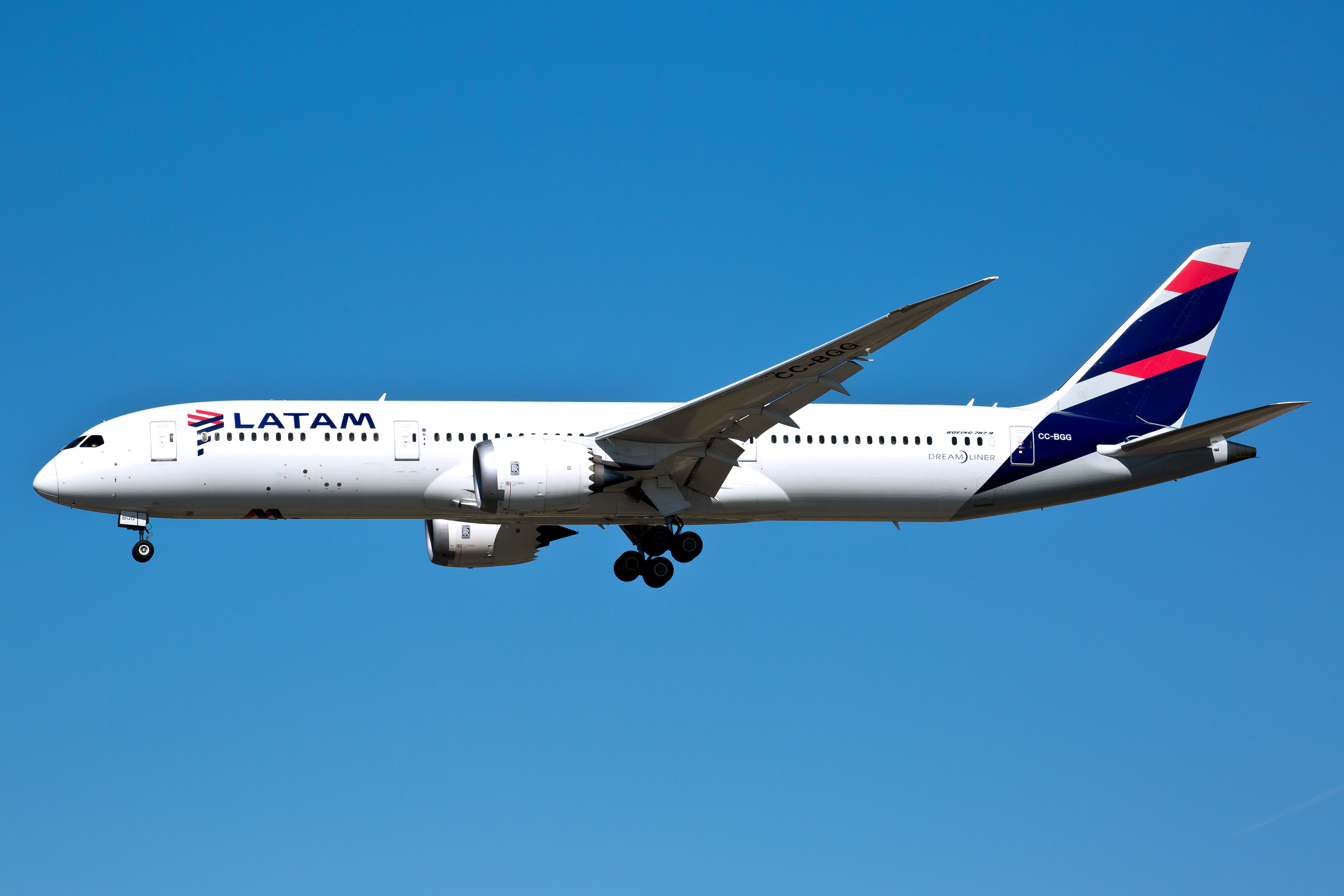
LATAM Airlines is the largest airline in Latin America in terms of number of annual passengers flown.

Among the first countries to have regular airlines in Latin America and the Caribbean were Bolivia with Lloyd Aéreo Boliviano, Cuba with Cubana de Aviación, Colombia with Avianca (the first airline established in the Americas), Argentina with Aerolíneas Argentinas, Chile with LAN Chile (today LATAM Airlines), Brazil with Varig, the Dominican Republic with Dominicana de Aviación, Mexico with Mexicana de Aviación, Trinidad and Tobago with BWIA West Indies Airways (today Caribbean Airlines), Venezuela with Aeropostal, Puerto Rico with Puertorriquena; and TACA based in El Salvador and representing several airlines of Central America (Costa Rica, Guatemala, Honduras and Nicaragua). All the previous airlines started regular operations well before World War II. Puerto Rican commercial airlines such as Prinair, Oceanair, Fina Air and Vieques Air Link came much after the second world war, as did several others from other countries like Mexico's Interjet and Volaris, Venezuela's Aserca Airlines and others.

The air travel market has evolved rapidly over recent years in Latin America. Some industry estimates indicated in 2011 that over 2,000 new aircraft will begin service over the next five years in this region.

These airlines serve domestic flights within their countries, as well as connections within Latin America and also overseas flights to North America, Europe, Australia, and Asia.

Only four airline groups – Avianca, Panama's Copa, Mexico's Volaris, and LATAM Airlines – have international subsidiaries and cover many destinations within the Americas as well as major hubs in other continents. LATAM with Chile as the central operation along with Peru, Ecuador, Colombia, Brazil and Argentina and formerly with some operations in the Dominican Republic. The Avianca group has its main operation in Colombia based around the hub in Bogotá, Colombia, as well as subsidiaries in various Latin American countries with hubs in San Salvador, El Salvador, as well as Lima, Peru, with a smaller operation in Ecuador. Copa has subsidiaries Copa Airlines Colombia and Wingo, both in Colombia, while Volaris of Mexico has Volaris Costa Rica and Volaris El Salvador, and the Irelandia group formerly included Viva Aerobus of Mexico, Viva Colombia and Viva Air Peru.

== Regulation ==
=== National ===
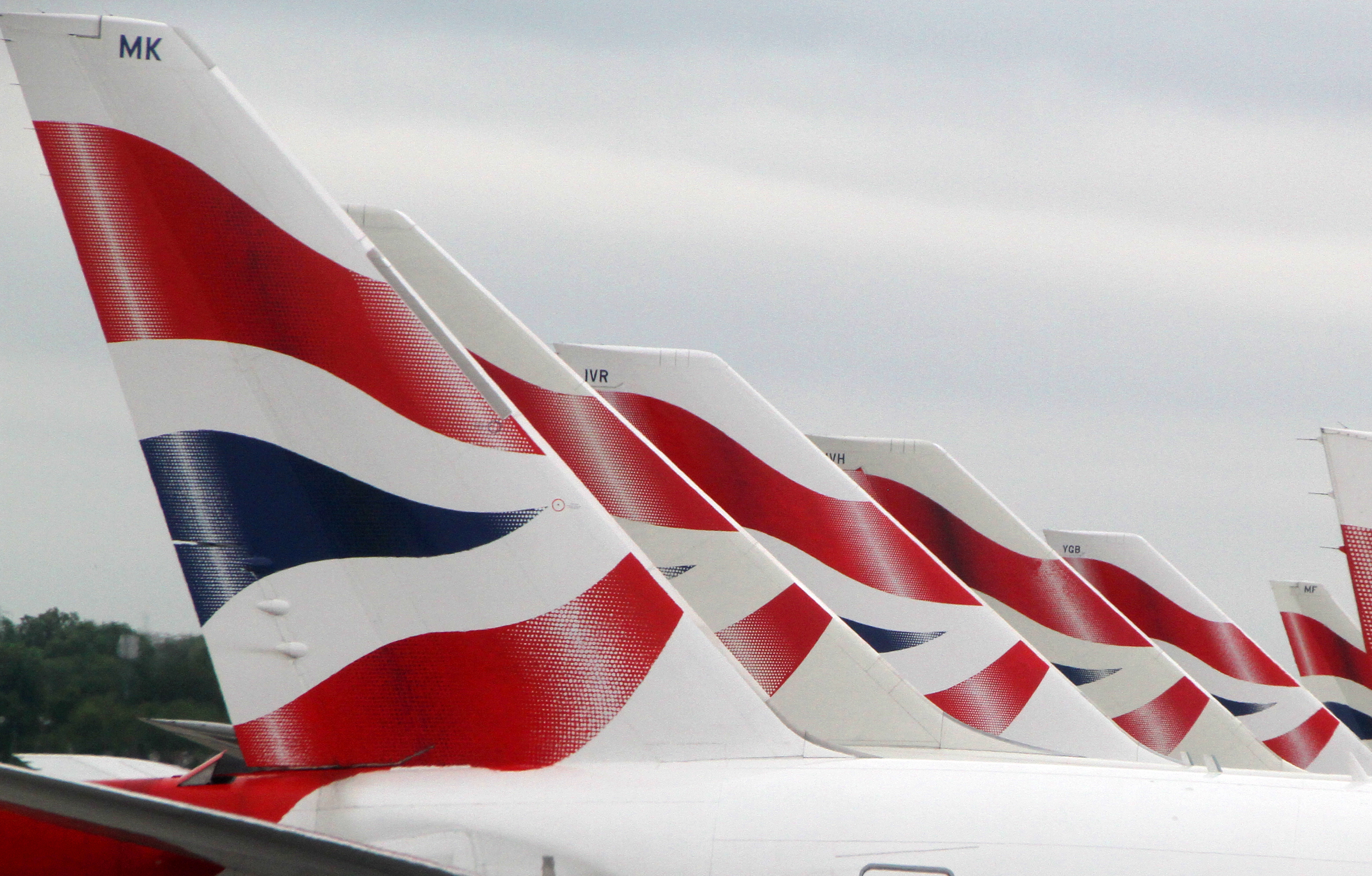
Union Jack tails of British Airways, UK's flag carrier

Many countries have national airlines that the government owns and operates. Fully private airlines are subject to much government regulation for economic, political, and safety concerns. For instance, governments often intervene to halt airline labor actions to protect the free flow of people, communications, and goods between different regions without compromising safety.

The United States, Australia, and to a lesser extent Brazil, Mexico, India, the United Kingdom, and Japan have "deregulated" their airlines. In the past, these governments dictated airfares, route networks, and other operational requirements for each airline. Since deregulation, airlines have been largely free to negotiate their own operating arrangements with different airports, enter and exit routes easily, and to levy airfares and supply flights according to market demand. The entry barriers for new airlines are lower in a deregulated market, and so the U.S. has seen hundreds of airlines start up (sometimes for only a brief operating period). This has produced far greater competition than before deregulation in most markets. The added competition, together with pricing freedom, means that new entrants often take market share with highly reduced rates that, to a limited degree, full service airlines must match. This is a major constraint on profitability for established carriers, which tend to have a higher cost base.

As a result, profitability in a deregulated market is uneven for most airlines. These forces have caused some major airlines to go out of business, in addition to most of the poorly established new entrants.

In the United States, the airline industry is dominated by four large firms. Because of industry consolidation, after fuel prices dropped considerably in 2015, very little of the savings were passed on to consumers.

=== International ===
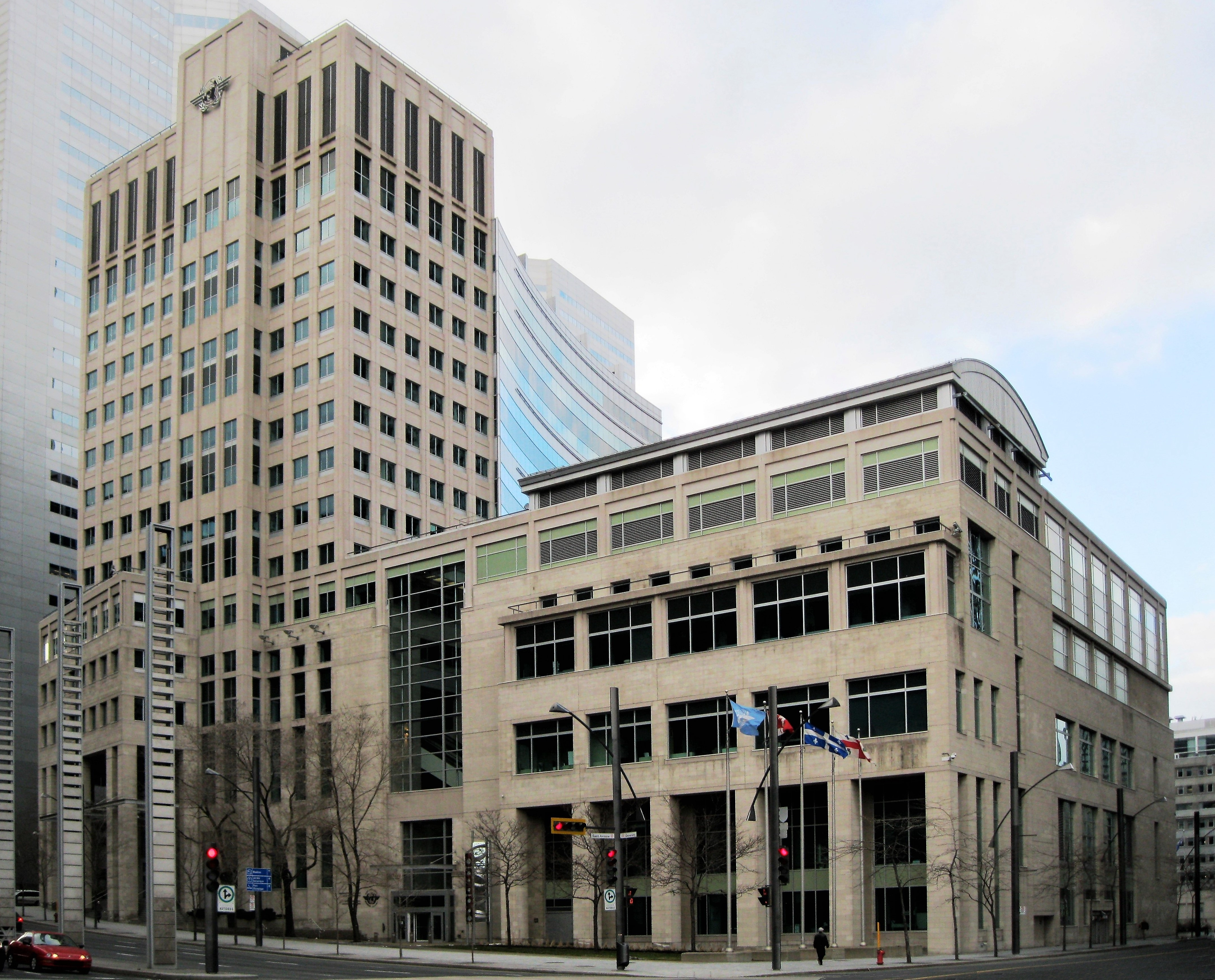
International Civil Aviation Organization headquarters in Montreal

Groups such as the International Civil Aviation Organization establish worldwide standards for safety and other vital concerns. Most international air traffic is regulated by bilateral agreements between countries, which designate specific carriers to operate on specific routes. The model of such an agreement was the Bermuda Agreement between the US and UK following World War II, which designated airports to be used for transatlantic flights and gave each government the authority to nominate carriers to operate routes.

Bilateral agreements are based on the "freedoms of the air", a group of generalized traffic rights ranging from the freedom to overfly a country to the freedom to provide domestic flights within a country (a very rarely granted right known as cabotage). Most agreements permit airlines to fly from their home country to designated airports in the other country: some also extend the freedom to provide continuing service to a third country, or to another destination in the other country while carrying passengers from overseas.

In the 1990s, "open skies" agreements became more common. These agreements take many of these regulatory powers from state governments and open up international routes to further competition. Open skies agreements have met some criticism, particularly within the European Union, whose airlines would be at a comparative disadvantage with the United States' because of cabotage restrictions.

== Economy ==
In 2017, 4.1 billion passengers have been carried by airlines in 41.9 million commercial scheduled flights (an average payload of 98 passengers), for 7.75 trillion passenger kilometers (an average trip of 1890 km) over 45,091 airline routes served globally. In 2016, air transport generated $704.4 billion of revenue in 2016, employed 10.2 million workers, supported 65.5 million jobs and $2.7 trillion of economic activity: 3.6% of the global GDP.

In July 2016, the total weekly airline capacity was 181.1 billion Available Seat Kilometers (+6.9% compared to July 2015): 57.6bn in Asia-Pacific, 47.7bn in Europe, 46.2bn in North America, 12.2bn in Middle East, 12.0bn in Latin America and 5.4bn in Africa.

Top 150 airline groups
	2016	2015	2014	2013	2012	2011	2010	2009	2008
Revenue ($bn)	694	698	704	684	663	634	560	481	540
Operating result ($bn)	58.9	65.0	30.4	27.5	20.7	21.3	32.4	1.7	−15.3
Operating margin (%)	8.5%	9.3%	4.3%	4.0%	3.1%	3.4%	5.8%	0.4%	−2.8%
Net result ($bn)	34.2	42.4	11.7	15.3	4.6	0.3	19.0	−5.7	−32.5
Net margin (%)	4.9%	6.1%	1.7%	2.2%	0.7%	0.0%	3.4%	−1.2%	−6.0%

=== Costs ===
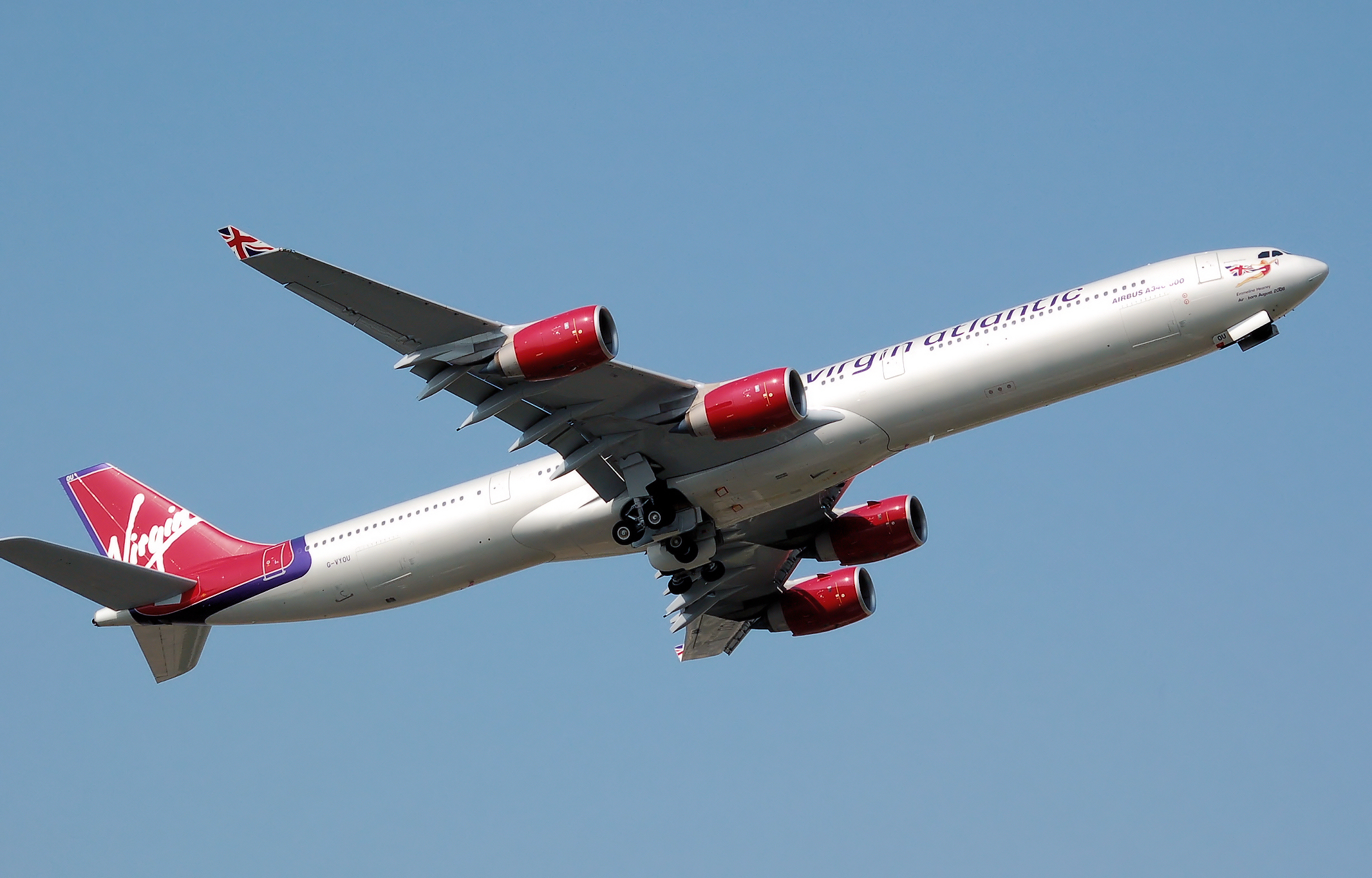
An Airbus A340-600 of Virgin Atlantic. In October 2008, Virgin Atlantic offered to combine its operations with BMI in an effort to reduce operating costs.

Airlines have substantial fixed and operating costs to establish and maintain air services: labor, fuel, airplanes, engines, spares and parts, IT services and networks, airport equipment, airport handling services, booking commissions, advertising, catering, training, aviation insurance and other costs. Thus all but a small percentage of the income from ticket sales is paid out to a wide variety of external providers or internal cost centers.

Moreover, the industry is structured so that airlines often act as tax collectors. Airline fuel is untaxed because of a series of treaties existing between countries. Ticket prices include a number of fees, taxes and surcharges beyond the control of airlines. Airlines are also responsible for enforcing government regulations. If airlines carry passengers without proper documentation on an international flight, they are responsible for returning them back to the original country.

Analysis of the 1992–1996 period shows that every player in the air transport chain is far more profitable than the airlines, who collect and pass through fees and revenues to them from ticket sales. While airlines as a whole earned 6% return on capital employed (2–3.5% less than the cost of capital), airports earned 10%, catering companies 10–13%, handling companies 11–14%, aircraft lessors 15%, aircraft manufacturers 16%, and global distribution companies more than 30%.

There has been continuing cost competition from low cost airlines. Many companies emulate Southwest Airlines in various respects. The lines between full-service and low-cost airlines have become blurred – e.g., with most "full service" airlines introducing baggage check fees despite Southwest not doing so.

Many airlines in the U.S. and elsewhere have experienced business difficulty. U.S. airlines that have declared Chapter 11 bankruptcy since 1990 have included American Airlines, Continental Airlines (twice), Delta Air Lines, Northwest Airlines, Pan Am, United Airlines and US Airways (twice).

Where an airline has established an engineering base at an airport, then there may be considerable economic advantages in using that same airport as a preferred focus (or "hub") for its scheduled flights.

Fuel hedging is a contractual tool used by transportation companies like airlines to reduce their exposure to volatile and potentially rising fuel costs. Several low-cost carriers such as Southwest Airlines adopt this practice. Southwest is credited with maintaining strong business profits between 1999 and the early 2000s due to its fuel hedging policy. Many other airlines are replicating Southwest's hedging policy to control their fuel costs.

Operating costs for US major airlines are primarily aircraft operating expense including jet fuel, aircraft maintenance, depreciation and aircrew for 44%, servicing expense for 29% (traffic 11%, passenger 11% and aircraft 7%), 14% for reservations and sales and 13% for overheads (administration 6% and advertising 2%). An average US major Boeing 757-200 flies 1,252 miles (2,015 km) stages 11.3 block hours per day and costs $2,550 per block hour: $923 of ownership, $590 of maintenance, $548 of fuel and $489 of crew; or $13.34 per 186 seats per block hour. For a Boeing 737-500, a low-cost carrier like Southwest have lower operating costs at $1,526 than a full service one like United at $2,974, and higher productivity with 399,746 ASM per day against 264,284, resulting in a unit cost of 0.38 $cts/ASM against 1.13 $cts/ASM.

McKinsey observes that "newer technology, larger aircraft, and increasingly efficient operations continually drive down the cost of running an airline", from nearly 40 US cents per ASK at the beginning of the jet age, to just above 10 cents since 2000. Those improvements were passed onto the customer due to high competition: fares have been falling throughout the history of airlines.

=== Revenue ===
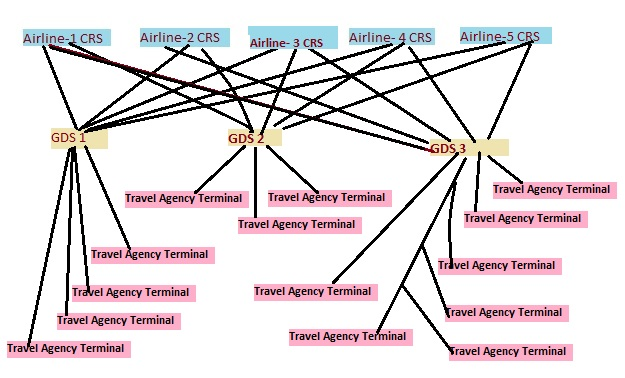
Diagram of an airline Global Distribution System

Airlines assign prices to their services in an attempt to maximize profitability. The pricing of airline tickets has become increasingly complicated over the years and is now largely determined by computerized yield management systems.

Because of the complications in scheduling flights and maintaining profitability, airlines have many loopholes that can be used by the knowledgeable traveler. Many of these airfare secrets are becoming more and more known to the general public, so airlines are forced to make constant adjustments.

Most airlines use differentiated pricing, a form of price discrimination, to sell air services at varying prices simultaneously to different segments. Factors influencing the price include the days remaining until departure, the booked load factor, the forecast of total demand by price point, competitive pricing in force, and variations by day of week of departure and by time of day. Carriers often accomplish this by dividing each cabin of the aircraft (first, business and economy) into a number of travel classes for pricing purposes.

A complicating factor is that of origin-destination control ("O&D control"). Someone purchasing a ticket from Melbourne to Sydney (as an example) for A$200 is competing with someone else who wants to fly Melbourne to Los Angeles through Sydney on the same flight, and who is willing to pay A$1400. Should the airline prefer the $1400 passenger, or the $200 passenger plus a possible Sydney-Los Angeles passenger willing to pay $1300? Airlines have to make hundreds of thousands of similar pricing decisions daily.

The advent of advanced computerized reservations systems in the late 1970s, most notably Sabre, allowed airlines to easily perform cost-benefit analyses on different pricing structures, leading to almost perfect price discrimination in some cases (that is, filling each seat on an aircraft at the highest price that can be charged without driving the consumer elsewhere).

The intense nature of airfare pricing has led to the term "fare war" to describe efforts by airlines to undercut other airlines on competitive routes. Through computers, new airfares can be published quickly and efficiently to the airlines' sales channels. For this purpose the airlines use the Airline Tariff Publishing Company (ATPCO), who distribute latest fares for more than 500 airlines to Computer Reservation Systems across the world.

The extent of these pricing phenomena is strongest in "legacy" carriers. In contrast, low fare carriers usually offer pre-announced and simplified price structure, and sometimes quote prices for each leg of a trip separately.

Computers also allow airlines to predict, with some accuracy, how many passengers will actually fly after making a reservation to fly. This allows airlines to overbook their flights enough to fill the aircraft while accounting for "no-shows", but not enough (in most cases) to force paying passengers off the aircraft for lack of seats, stimulative pricing for low demand flights coupled with overbooking on high demand flights can help reduce this figure. This is especially crucial during tough economic times as airlines undertake massive cuts to ticket prices to retain demand.

Over January/February 2018, the cheapest airline surveyed by price comparator rome2rio was now-defunct Tigerair Australia with $0.06/km followed by AirAsia X with $0.07/km, while the most expensive was Charterlines, Inc. with $1.26/km followed by Buddha Air with $1.18/km.

For the IATA, the global airline industry revenue was $754 billion in 2017 for a $38.4 billion collective profit, and should rise by 10.7% to $834 billion in 2018 for a $33.8 billion profit forecast, down by 12% due to rising jet fuel and labor costs.

The demand for air transport will be less elastic for longer flights than for shorter flights, and more elastic for leisure travel than for business travel.

Airlines often have a strong seasonality, with traffic low in winter and peaking in summer. In Europe the most extreme market are the Greek islands with July/August having more than ten times the winter traffic, as Jet2 is the most seasonal among low-cost carriers with July having seven times the January traffic, whereas legacy carriers are much less with only 85/115% variability.

=== Assets and financing ===
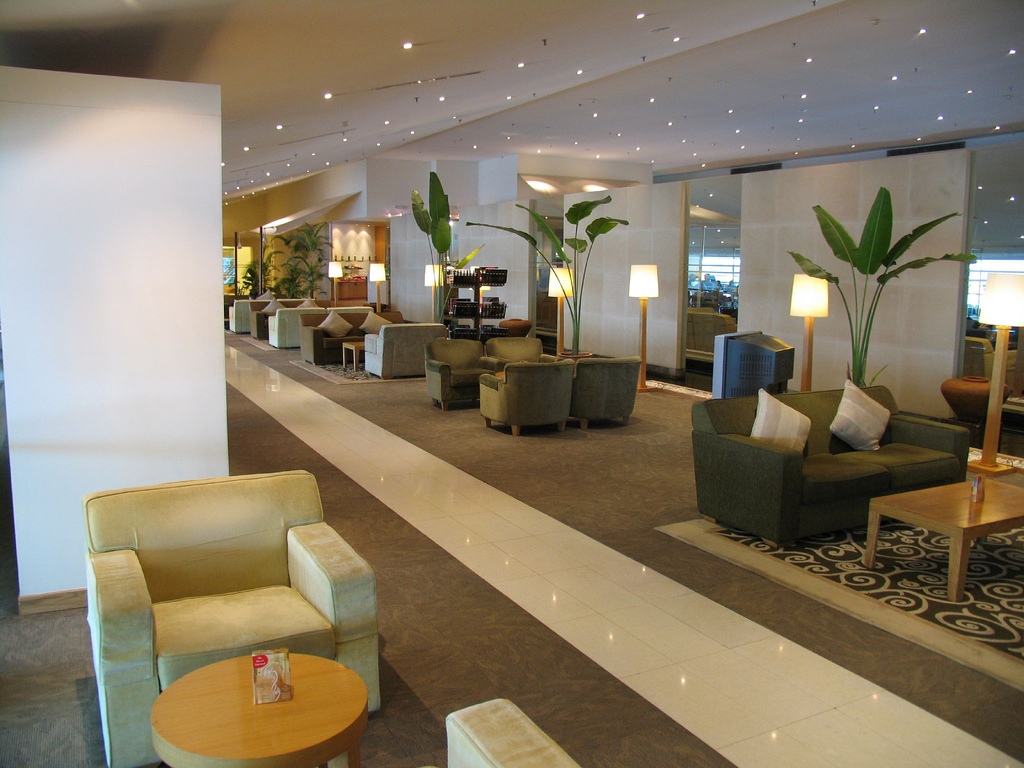
The 'Golden Lounge' of Malaysia Airlines at Kuala Lumpur International Airport (KLIA).

Airline financing is quite complex, since airlines are highly leveraged operations. Not only must they purchase (or lease) new airliner bodies and engines regularly, they must make major long-term fleet decisions with the goal of meeting the demands of their markets while producing a fleet that is relatively economical to operate and maintain; comparably Southwest Airlines and their reliance on a single airplane type (the Boeing 737 and derivatives), with the now defunct Eastern Air Lines which operated 17 different aircraft types, each with varying pilot, engine, maintenance, and support needs.

A second financial issue is that of hedging oil and fuel purchases, which are usually second only to labor in its relative cost to the company. However, with the current high fuel prices it has become the largest cost to an airline. Legacy airlines, compared with new entrants, have been hit harder by rising fuel prices partly due to the running of older, less fuel efficient aircraft. While hedging instruments can be expensive, they can easily pay for themselves many times over in periods of increasing fuel costs, such as in the 2000–2005 period.

In view of the congestion apparent at many international airports, the ownership of slots at certain airports (the right to take-off or land an aircraft at a particular time of day or night) has become a significant tradable asset for many airlines. Clearly take-off slots at popular times of the day can be critical in attracting the more profitable business traveler to a given airline's flight and in establishing a competitive advantage against a competing airline.

If a particular city has two or more airports, market forces will tend to attract the less profitable routes, or those on which competition is weakest, to the less congested airport, where slots are likely to be more available and therefore cheaper. For example, Reagan National Airport attracts profitable routes due partly to its congestion, leaving less-profitable routes to Baltimore-Washington International Airport and Dulles International Airport.

Other factors, such as surface transport facilities and onward connections, will also affect the relative appeal of different airports and some long-distance flights may need to operate from the one with the longest runway. For example, LaGuardia Airport is the preferred airport for most of Manhattan due to its proximity, while long-distance routes must use John F. Kennedy International Airport's longer runways.

=== Airline alliances ===
The first airline alliance was formed in the 1930s when Pan Am and its subsidiary, Panair do Brasil, agreed to codeshare routes in Latin America when they overlapped with each other.

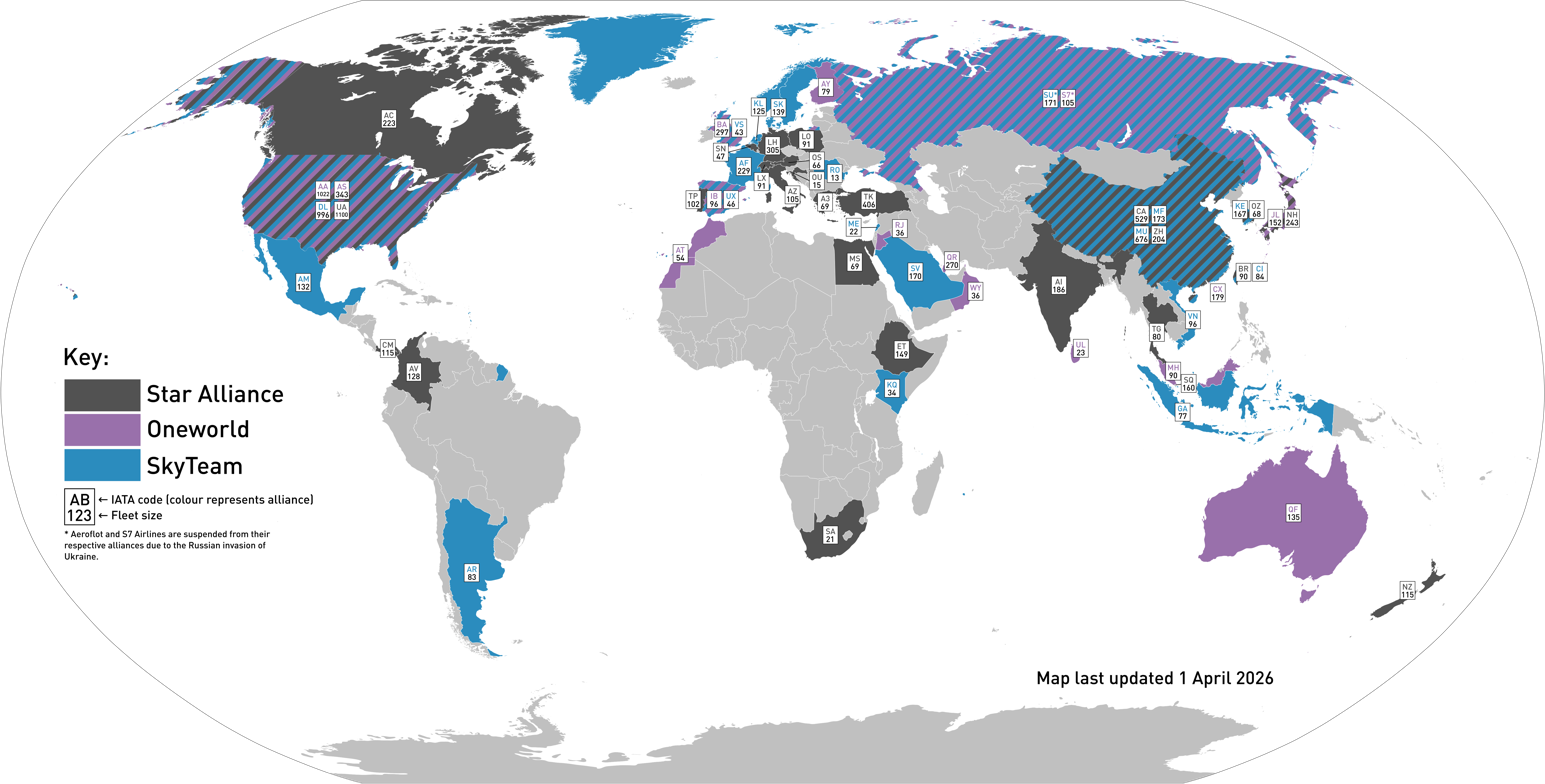
The 3 major airline alliances and the current fleet size of their home carriers (excluding subsidiaries, cargo and connecting partners) as of September 2024 Star Alliance SkyTeam Oneworld

Codesharing involves one airline selling tickets for another airline's flights under its own airline code. An early example of this was Japan Airlines' (JAL) codesharing partnership with Aeroflot in the 1960s on Tokyo–Moscow flights; Aeroflot operated the flights using Aeroflot aircraft, but JAL sold tickets for the flights as if they were JAL flights.Another example was the Austrian–Sabena partnership on the Vienna–Brussels–New York/JFK route during the late '60s, using a Sabena Boeing 707 with Austrian livery.

Since airline reservation requests are often made by city-pair (such as "show me flights from Chicago to Düsseldorf"), an airline that can codeshare with another airline for a variety of routes might be able to be listed as indeed offering a Chicago–Düsseldorf flight. The passenger is advised however, that airline no. 1 operates the flight from say Chicago to Amsterdam (for example), and airline no. 2 operates the continuing flight (on a different airplane, sometimes from another terminal) to Düsseldorf. Thus the primary rationale for code sharing is to expand one's service offerings in city-pair terms to increase sales.

A more recent development is the airline alliance, which became prevalent in the late 1990s. These alliances can act as virtual mergers to get around government restrictions. The largest are Star Alliance, SkyTeam and Oneworld, and these accounted for over 60% of global commercial air traffic as of 2015. Alliances of airlines coordinate their passenger service programs (such as lounges and frequent-flyer programs), offer special interline tickets and often engage in extensive codesharing (sometimes systemwide). These are increasingly integrated business combinations—sometimes including cross-equity arrangements—in which products, service standards, schedules, and airport facilities are standardized and combined for higher efficiency. One of the first airlines to start an alliance with another airline was KLM, who partnered with Northwest Airlines. Both airlines later entered the SkyTeam alliance after the fusion of KLM and Air France in 2004.

Often the companies combine IT operations, or purchase fuel and aircraft as a bloc to achieve higher bargaining power. However, the alliances have been most successful at purchasing invisible supplies and services, such as fuel. Airlines usually prefer to purchase items visible to their passengers to differentiate themselves from local competitors. If an airline's main domestic competitor flies Boeing airliners, then the airline may prefer to use Airbus aircraft regardless of what the rest of the alliance chooses.

=== Largest airlines ===
The world's largest airlines can be defined in several ways. As of 2019, American Airlines Group was the largest by fleet size, passengers carried and revenue passenger mile. Delta Air Lines was the largest by revenue, assets value and market capitalization. Lufthansa Group was the largest by number of employees, FedEx Express by freight ton-kilometers, Turkish Airlines by number of countries served and UPS Airlines by number of destinations served (though United Airlines was the largest passenger airline by number of destinations served).

=== State support ===
Historically, air travel has survived largely through state support, whether in the form of equity or subsidies. The airline industry as a whole has made a cumulative loss during its 100-year history.

One argument is that positive externalities, such as higher growth due to global mobility, outweigh the microeconomic losses and justify continuing government intervention. A historically high level of government intervention in the airline industry can be seen as part of a wider political consensus on strategic forms of transport, such as highways and railways, both of which receive public funding in most parts of the world. Although many countries continue to operate state-owned or parastatal airlines, many large airlines today are privately owned and are therefore governed by microeconomic principles to maximize shareholder profit.

In December 1991, the collapse of Pan Am, an airline often credited for shaping the international airline industry, highlighted the financial complexities faced by major airline companies.

Following the 1978 deregulation, U.S. carriers did not manage to make an aggregate profit for 12 years in 31, including four years where combined losses amounted to $10 billion, but rebounded with eight consecutive years of profits since 2010, including its four with over $10 billion profits. They drop loss-making routes, avoid fare wars and market share battles, limit capacity growth, add hub feed with regional jets to increase their profitability. They change schedules to create more connections, buy used aircraft, reduce international frequencies and leverage partnerships to optimize capacities and benefit from overseas connectivity.

== Environment ==
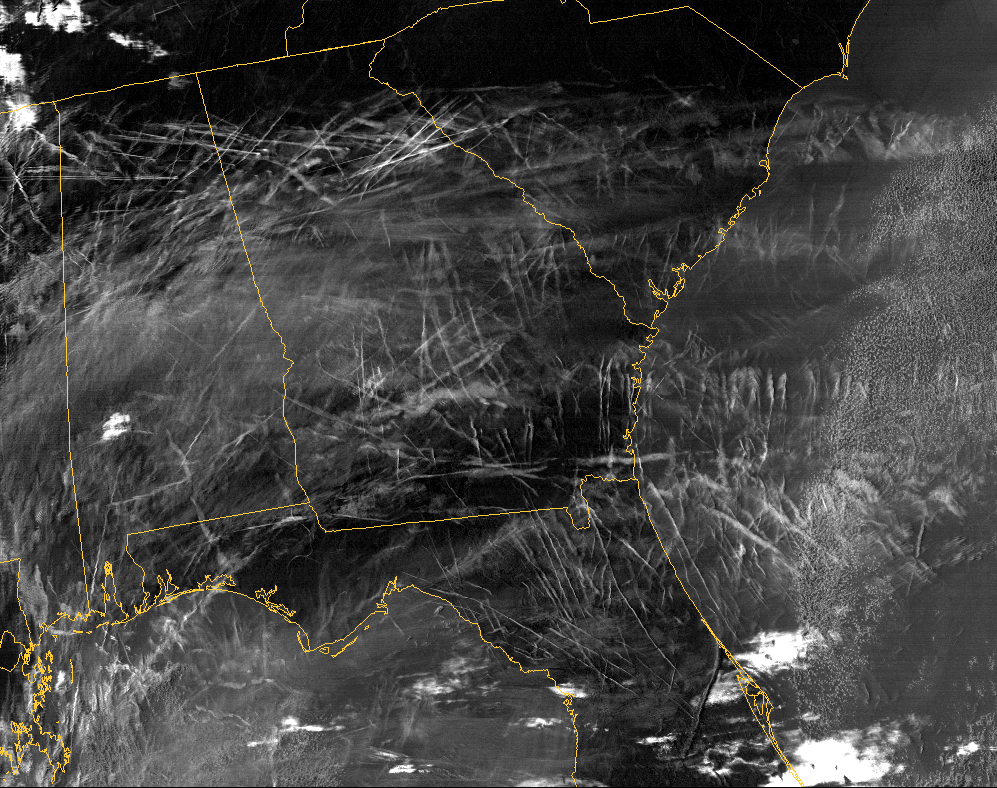
MODIS tracking of contrails generated by air traffic over the southeastern United States on 29 January 2004.

Aircraft engines emit noise pollution, gases and particulate emissions, and contribute to global dimming. Growth of the industry in recent years raised a number of ecological questions.

Domestic air transport grew in China at 15.5 percent annually from 2001 to 2006. The rate of air travel globally increased at 3.7 percent per year over the same time. In the EU greenhouse gas emissions from aviation increased by 87% between 1990 and 2006. However it must be compared with the flights increase, only in UK, between 1990 and 2006 terminal passengers increased from 100 000 thousands to 250 000 thousands., according to AEA reports every year, 750 million passengers travel by European airlines, which also share 40% of merchandise value in and out of Europe. Without even pressure from "green activists", targeting lower ticket prices, generally, airlines do what is possible to cut the fuel consumption (and gas emissions connected therewith). Further, according to some reports, it can be concluded that the last piston-powered aircraft were as fuel-efficient as the average jet in 2005.

Despite continuing efficiency improvements from the major aircraft manufacturers, the expanding demand for global air travel has resulted in growing greenhouse gas (GHG) emissions. In 2009, it was calculated that the aviation sector, including U.S. domestic and global international travel, make approximately 1.6 percent of global anthropogenic GHG emissions per annum. That year, North America accounts for nearly 40 percent of the world's GHG emissions from aviation fuel use.

CO_{2} emissions from the jet fuel burned per passenger on an average 3,200 kilometers (2,000 mi) airline flight is about 353 kilograms (776 pounds). Loss of natural habitat potential associated with the jet fuel burned per passenger on a 3,200 kilometers (2,000 mi) airline flight is estimated to be 250 square meters (2700 square feet).

In the context of climate change and peak oil, there is a debate about possible taxation of air travel and the inclusion of aviation in an emissions trading scheme, with a view to ensuring that the total external costs of aviation are taken into account.

In 2008 it was reported in the Washington Post that the airline industry is responsible for about 11 percent of greenhouse gases emitted by the U.S. transportation sector. Boeing estimated that biofuels could reduce flight-related greenhouse-gas emissions by 60 to 80 percent. The solution put forth at the time would be to blend algae fuels with existing jet fuel: but so far this has yet to happen.

- Boeing and Air New Zealand were collaborating with leading Brazilian biofuel maker Tecbio, New Zealand's Aquaflow Bionomic and other jet biofuel developers around the world.
- Virgin Atlantic and Virgin Green Fund were looking into the technology as part of a biofuel initiative.
- KLM made the first commercial flight with biofuel in 2009.

There are projects on electric aircraft, and some of which are fully operational as of 2013.

== Call signs ==
Each operator of a scheduled or charter flight uses an airline call sign when communicating with airports or air traffic control. Most of these call-signs are derived from the airline's trade name, but for reasons of history, marketing, or the need to reduce ambiguity in spoken English (so that pilots do not mistakenly make navigational decisions based on instructions issued to a different aircraft), some airlines and air forces use call-signs less obviously connected with their trading name. For example, British Airways uses a Speedbird call-sign, named after the logo of one of its predecessors, BOAC, while SkyEurope used Relax.

== Personnel ==
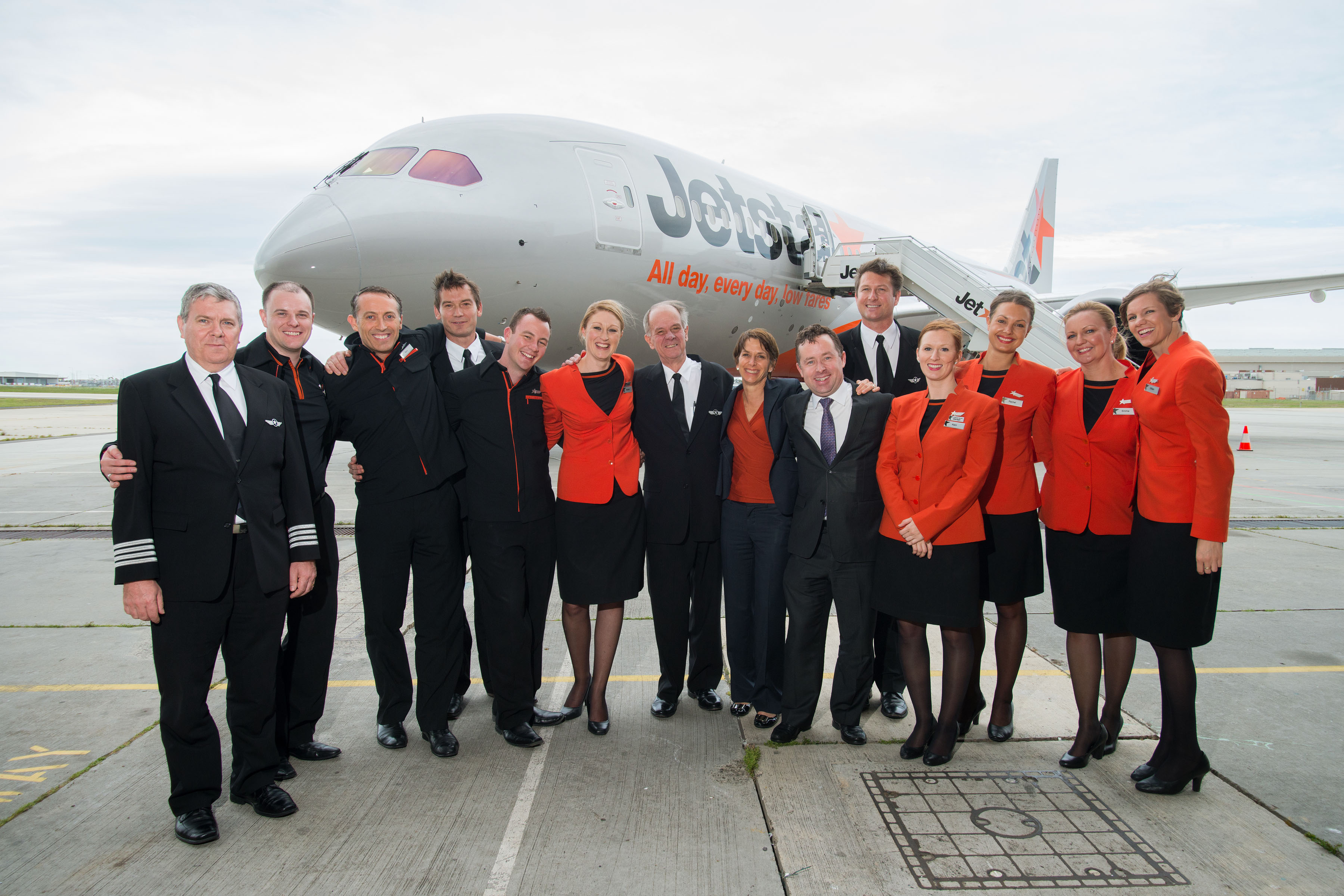
The aircrew of a Jetstar Boeing 787

The various types of airline personnel include flight crew, responsible for the operation of the aircraft. Flight crew members include: pilots (captain and first officer: some older aircraft also required a flight engineer and/or a navigator); flight attendants (led by a purser on larger aircraft); In-flight security personnel on some airlines (most notably El Al)

Groundcrew, responsible for operations at airports, include Aerospace and avionics engineers responsible for certifying the aircraft for flight and management of aircraft maintenance; Aerospace engineers, responsible for airframe, powerplant and electrical systems maintenance; Avionics engineers responsible for avionics and instruments maintenance; Airframe and powerplant technicians; Electric System technicians, responsible for maintenance of electrical systems; Flight dispatchers; Baggage handlers; Ramp Agents; Remote centralized weight and balancing; Gate agents; Ticket agents; Passenger service agents (such as airline lounge employees); Reservation agents, usually (but not always) at facilities outside the airport; Crew schedulers.

Airlines follow a corporate structure where each broad area of operations (such as maintenance, flight operations (including flight safety), and passenger service) is supervised by a vice president. Larger airlines often appoint vice presidents to oversee each of the airline's hubs as well. Airlines employ lawyers to deal with regulatory procedures and other administrative tasks.

== Trends ==
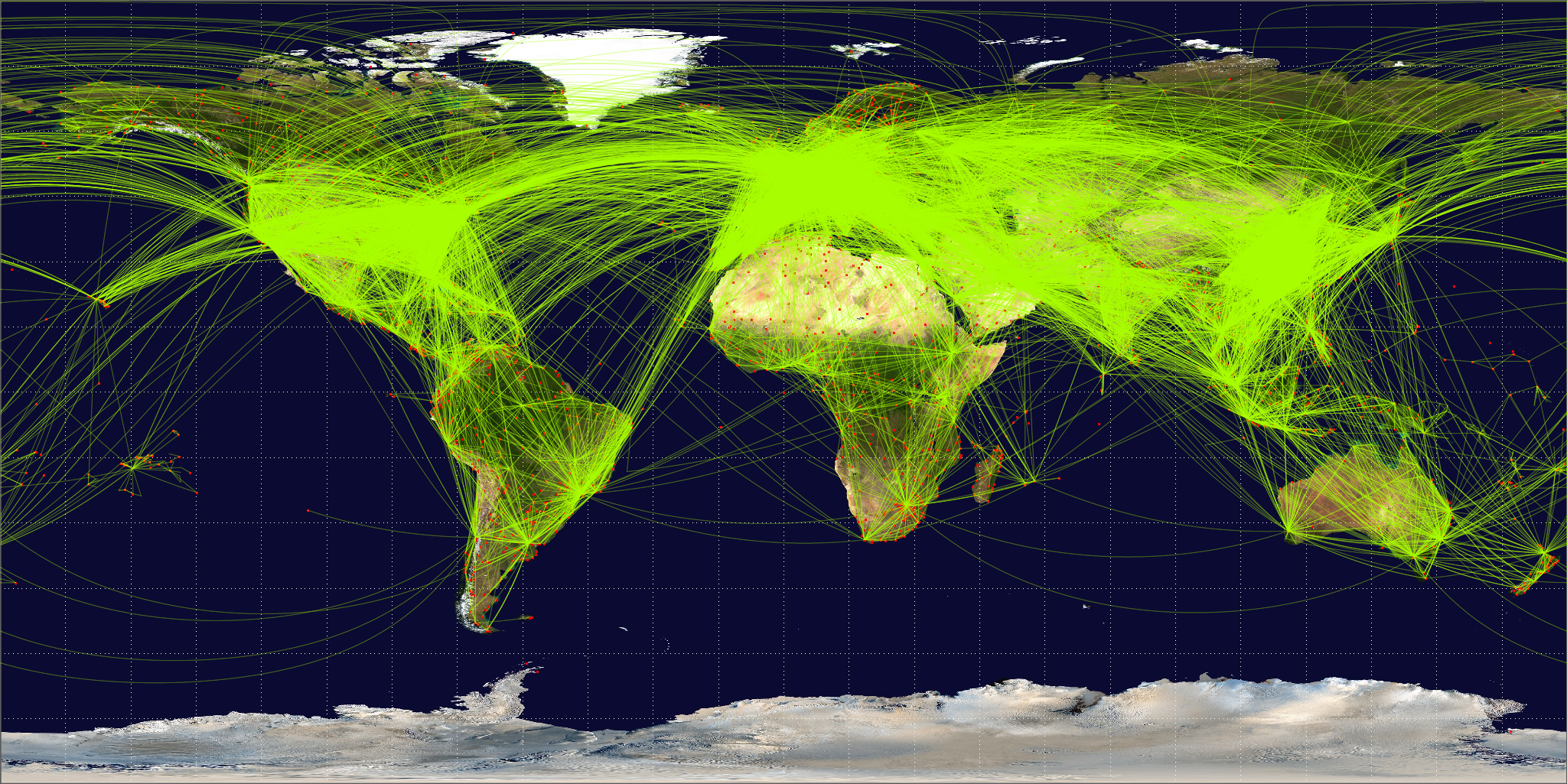
Map of scheduled airline traffic in 2024

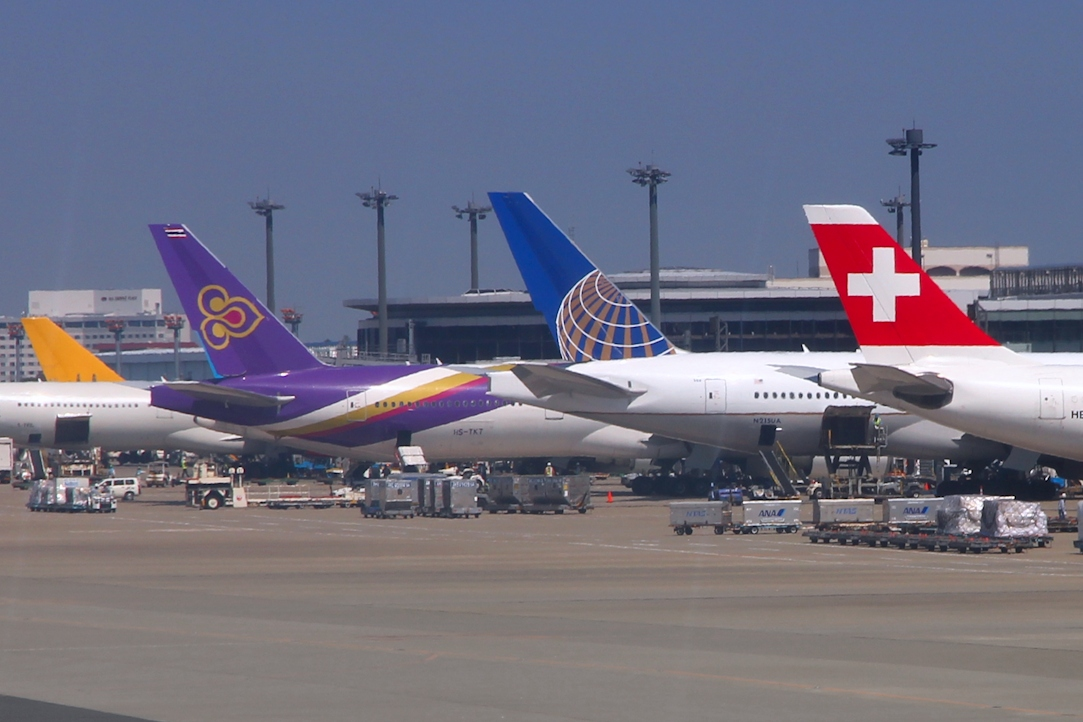
Aircraft of various airlines parked side by side at Tokyo Narita Airport, Japan in April 2012

The pattern of ownership has been privatized since the mid-1980s, that is, the ownership has gradually changed from governments to private and individual sectors or organizations. This occurs as regulators permit greater freedom and non-government ownership, in steps that are usually decades apart. This pattern is not seen for all airlines in all regions. Many major airlines operating between the 1940s and 1980s were government-owned or government-established. However, most airlines from the earliest days of air travel in the 1920s and 1930s were personal businesses.

Growth rates are not consistent in all regions, but countries with a deregulated airline industry have more competition and greater pricing freedom. This results in lower fares and sometimes dramatic spurts in traffic growth. The U.S., Australia, Canada, Japan, Brazil, India and other markets exhibit this trend. The industry has been observed to be cyclical in its financial performance. Four or five years of poor earnings precede five or six years of improvement. But profitability even in the good years is generally low, in the range of 2–3% net profit after interest and tax. In times of profit, airlines lease new generations of airplanes and upgrade services in response to higher demand. Since 1980, the industry has not earned back the cost of capital during the best of times. Conversely, in bad times losses can be dramatically worse. Warren Buffett in 1999 said "the money that had been made since the dawn of aviation by all of this country's airline companies was zero. Absolutely zero."

As in many mature industries, consolidation is a trend. Airline groupings may consist of limited bilateral partnerships, long-term, multi-faceted alliances between carriers, equity arrangements, mergers, or takeovers. Since governments often restrict ownership and merger between companies in different countries, most consolidation takes place within a country. By 1990, nearly 200 airlines in the U.S. had merged, been taken over, or gone out of business since the Airline Deregulation Act in 1978. Many international airline managers are lobbying their governments to permit greater consolidation to achieve higher economy and efficiency.

== Types ==
Passenger airlines can be grouped into various types, for example:

- Mainline airlines operate flights by the airline's main operating unit, rather than by regional affiliates or subsidiaries.
- Regional airlines, non-"mainline" airlines that operate regional aircraft; regionals typically operate over shorter non-intercontinental distances, often as feeder services for legacy mainline networks.
- Low-cost carriers, giving a "basic", "no-frills" and perceived inexpensive service.
- Business class airline, an airline aimed at the business traveler, featuring all business class seating and amenities.
- Charter airlines, operating outside regular schedule intervals.
- Flag carriers, the historically nationally owned airlines that were considered representative of the country overseas.
- Legacy carriers, US carriers that predate the Airline Deregulation Act of 1978.
- Major airlines of the United States, airlines with at least $1 billion in revenues.

In addition, there are several cargo-only airlines. This can involve specialized aircraft, like those with large cargo doors and reinforced floors, or modifying passenger planes for cargo-only flights. During the COVID-19 pandemic, some passenger airlines temporarily converted their planes for cargo-only flights to meet increased demand for freight transport.

== See also ==
- Air charter
- Air ferry
- Airline alliance
- Airline complaints
- Airline timetable
- Airliners.net
- Airlines of Africa
- Airport security
- Aviation safety
- Beyond rights
- Cargo airline
- Domestic flight
- Environmental impact of aviation
- Federal Aviation Administration
- Flight length
- Flight planning
- FlightAware
- Government contract flight
- Hyper-mobile travel
- Inflight magazine
- International Air Transport Association
- International flight
- Legacy carrier
- Virtual airline
- Low-cost carrier
- Red-eye flight
- Regional airline
- Transportation Security Administration
- World's busiest passenger air routes

=== Related lists ===
- Airline codes
- Largest airlines in the world
- List of airline liveries and logos
- Lists of airlines
- List of accidents and incidents involving commercial aircraft
- List of airline holding companies
- List of airline mergers and acquisitions
- Lists of defunct airlines
- List of helicopter airlines
- List of hub airports
- List of low-cost airlines
- List of national airlines
- List of regional airlines
- List of airline bankruptcies in the United States

== Bibliography ==
1. "A history of the world's airlines", R.E.G. Davies, Oxford U.P, 1964
2. "The airline encyclopedia, 1909–2000.” Myron J. Smith, Scarecrow Press, 2002
3. "Flying Off Course: The Economics of International Airlines," 3rd edition. Rigas Doganis, Routledge, New York, 2002.
4. "The Airline Business in the 21st Century." Rigas Doganis, Routledge, New York, 2001.
