= Complaint tablet to Ea-nāṣir =

Oldest known written complaint (c. 1750 BC)

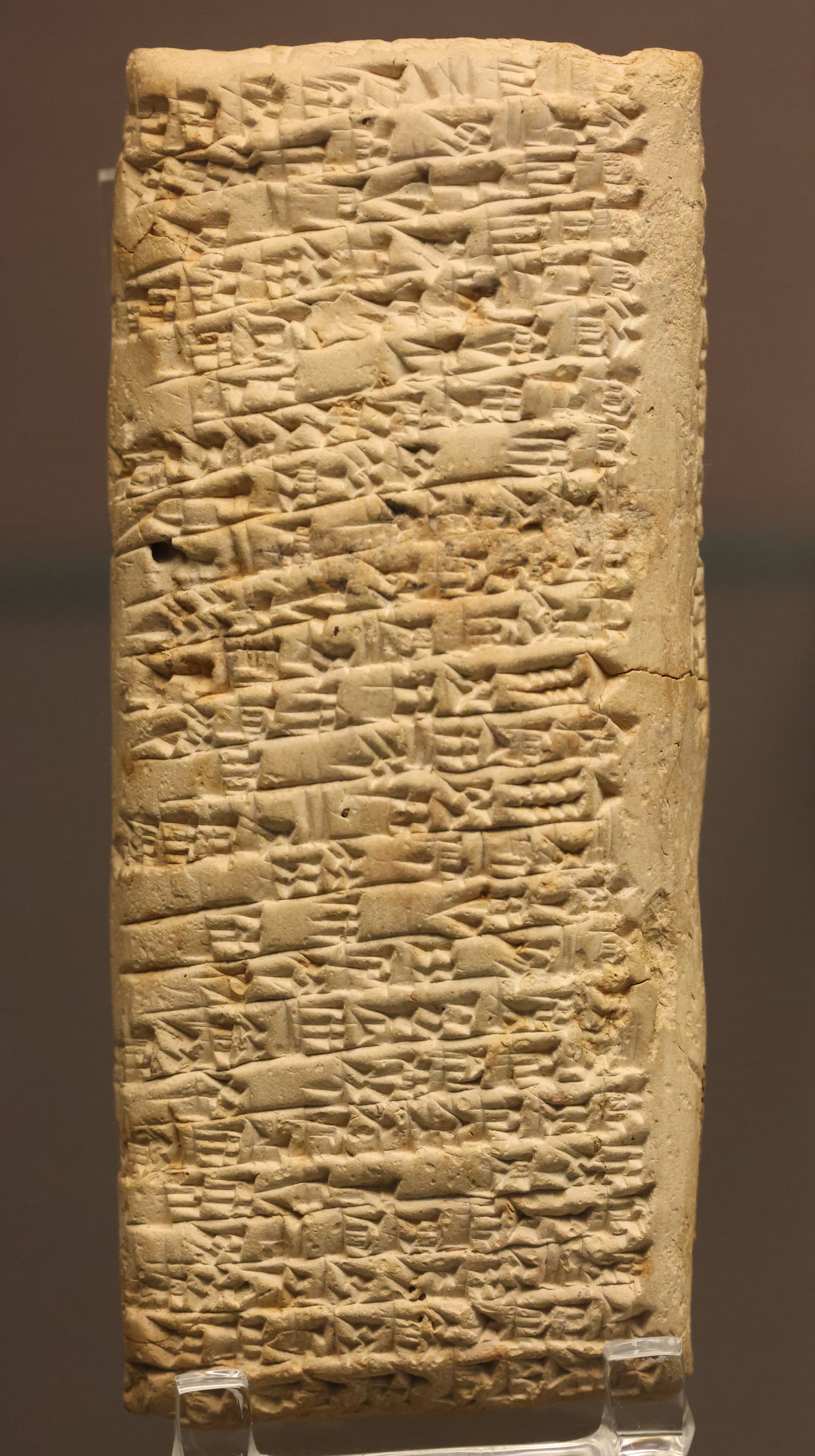
- Tablet on display in the British Museum in 2023, showing the reverse side upside down
- Material: Clay
- Height: 11.6 cm (4.6 in)
- Width: 5 cm (2.0 in)
- Created: c. 1750 BC
- Present location: Zayed National Museum, Abu Dhabi, on loan from the British Museum, London

The complaint tablet to Ea-nāṣir (UET V 81) is a clay tablet written c. 1750 BC in Akkadian cuneiform. It was sent to the copper merchant Ea-nāṣir in Ur by a dissatisfied customer.

The tablet was discovered by Sir Leonard Woolley among similar complaints and is held by the British Museum. It is recognized as the "Oldest Customer Complaint" by Guinness World Records. The tablet's content and Ea-nāṣir in particular gained popularity as an internet meme due to its relatable subject matter.

== Background ==
Ea-nāṣir was part of a group of traders called alik Tilmun, or "Dilmun traders". He is known from other texts to have been active in the 11th and 19th regnal years of the Larsa ruler Rim-Sîn I. Other tablets have been found in the ruins believed to be Ea-nāṣir's dwelling. These include a letter from a man named Arbituram who complained he had not received his copper yet, while another said he was tired of receiving bad copper.

== Description ==
=== Tablet ===
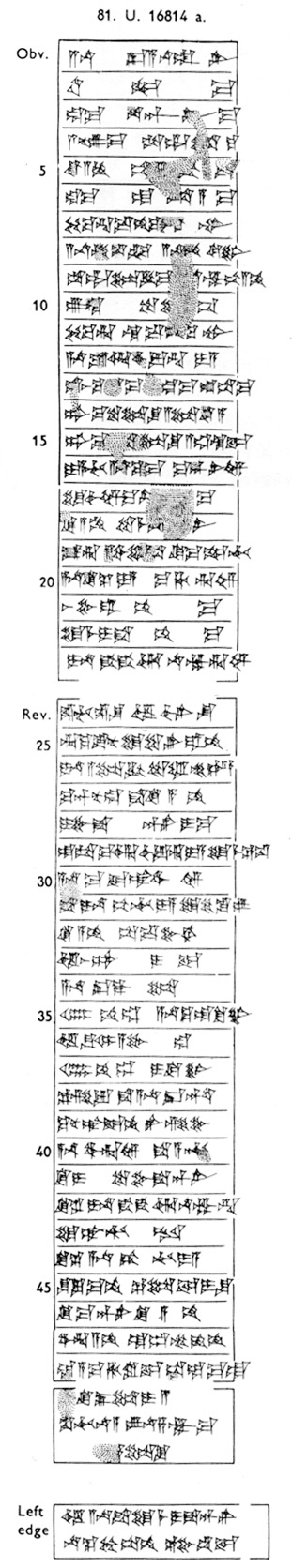
A transcription of the text on the obverse, reverse, and left edge of the tablet

The tablet is 11.6 centimetres (4 9/16 in) high, 5.0 cm (1 15/16 in) wide, 2.6 cm (1 in) thick, and slightly damaged.

In 2009, the inscription upon the tablet was stabilised with Paraloid B-72.

=== Content of complaint ===
The inscription relays a complaint from Nanni to Ea-nāṣir. Ea-nāṣir sold Nanni copper ingots from Dilmun and promised they were of fine quality. However, Nanni's servant was presented with poor-quality copper and told an equivalent of "take it or leave it". Nanni sent further messengers to take back the deposit, but Ea-nāṣir turned them away and treated them rudely. Nanni further detailed misdirection and delays with other deliveries. He demanded the return of his money and insisted that he will inspect future ingots on his property before accepting them.

== History and translations ==
The tablet was discovered by Sir Leonard Woolley during a joint expedition of the University of Pennsylvania and the British Museum from 1922 to 1934 in the Sumerian city of Ur. The tablet was found in ruins believed to be Ea-nāṣir's dwelling among similar letters.

Adolf Leo Oppenheim translated several of the tablet's lines into English in a 1954 article for Journal of the American Oriental Society. An English translation of the full tablet was published by W. F. Leemans in 1960; it incorporated Oppenheim's partial translation with input from Fritz Rudolf Kraus on the meaning of a few lines. Oppenheim published a full translation of the tablet himself in 1967, unaware of any other translations of this tablet. A Russian translation was published by I. M. Diakonoff in 1990. Another English translation inspired by that of Marc Van De Mieroop sent in a personal communication to Steven J. Garfinkle was published in 2010; a book review by Walter Farber noted that this translation "is not always true to details".

From February 2015 the complaint tablet has become an Internet meme due to its seemingly anachronistic nature and relatable subject matter. Its use as a meme likely started on Reddit then Tumblr before coming to wider attention. The tablet has been recognized by the Guinness World Records as the "oldest written customer complaint".
