= Airline complaints =

Airline complaints are any type of formal complaint filed by an airline customer either to the airline responsible for the grievance or the government office responsible for overseeing the airlines national industry. Airline complaints generally arise out of problems experienced during air travel that were left unresolved.

== Airline complaints in the US ==
According to the Airline Quality Rating 2007 report, airline hassles in the United States have increased since 2005. The rate of complaints, on the other hand, have remained roughly the same, with 0.88 complaints per 100,000, half of which were due to problems with flights or baggage. This may be due to passengers being more forgiving since 9/11. However, there is also criticism about whether the number of official complaints truly reflects the experience passengers are encountering, considering the difficulty passengers have in finding out how to issue a formal complaint. Furthermore, complaints about airline complaints have increased in the US, showing that those who are able to complain, are dissatisfied with the results.

== Airline complaints in Europe ==
In Europe, air passengers have more rights than in the US and must be compensated by law for overbookings, cancellations or flight delays. After this law (Regulation 261/2004) was introduced in the EU in early 2005, complaints soared, as expected, since more compensation could be expected by passengers who officially complained. In fact, complaints related to cancellations increased 600% and complaints related to delays increased 500%, not surprisingly since those are categories where increased compensation took effect since the new law.

== Airline complaints in Australia ==
Australia has no aviation-specific consumer protection legislation and no statutory entitlement to fixed compensation when a flight is delayed or cancelled; passenger rights derive from the Australian Consumer Law, under which airlines set their own terms for refunds and travel credits. Unresolved complaints by customers of Qantas, Jetstar and Virgin Australia may be referred to the Airline Customer Advocate, an industry-funded body established in 2012 that forwards complaints to the airline but cannot decide them. The consumer group CHOICE has described it as working "like a post box".

A government survey published in 2026 found that about half of Australian air travellers had experienced a disruption in the preceding year, that 8 per cent made a complaint, and that 17 per cent of those were satisfied with the process. The Advocate assessed 1,758 of about 3,800 complaints lodged with it in 2025 as eligible, resolving 85 per cent, up from 37 per cent in 2023. After proceedings by the Australian Competition and Consumer Commission, Qantas admitted selling tickets for flights it had already decided to cancel and in October 2024 was ordered by the Federal Court to pay A$100 million in penalties and about A$20 million to affected passengers. The 2024 Aviation White Paper announced a statutory ombuds scheme to replace the Advocate, with enabling legislation introduced in April 2026.

== Airline complaints in Saudi Arabia ==
In Saudi Arabia, the General Authority of Civil Aviation (GACA) is responsible for handling complaints against airlines. For this purpose, it has issued the Executive Regulation for the Protection of Customer Rights. This is managed through the General Department of Quality and Customer Protection, which focuses on the quality of services provided to travelers and enhancing the passenger experience at Saudi Arabia’s airports. The stated objective of the department is to improve service standards and passenger satisfaction levels. GACA enables passengers to submit suggestions or complaints against airlines and airports via its official website if they violate or fail to implement the procedures and rules of the Executive Regulation for the Protection of Customer Rights. Additionally, it publishes monthly reports on passenger satisfaction regarding airport services.

== Airlines receiving most complaints ==
In the US, Southwest Airlines had the lowest rate of complaints in 2006, with 0.11 complaints per 100,000 passengers, while US Airways and United Airlines had the worst rate of complaints, both with 1.36 complaints per 100,000 passengers. US Airways is also the US airline with the worst on-time performance, which might explain its rate of complaints.

== Government agencies overseeing complaints ==
In the US, the Department of Transportation is responsible for the airline industry and has a specific division called the Aviation Consumer Protection Service that handles airline complaints. They also publish figures on the performance of major US airlines, which are freely accessible on their website.

In the UK, the Civil Aviation Authority can help passengers with complaints about an airline, where passengers have complained to an airline and not been able to resolve their complaint. Alternative dispute resolution (for example mediation or adjudication) is available for passengers travelling in and out of the UK. A list of airlines who have signed up to ADR is published on the CAA's website.

In the European Union, several member countries do not have specific offices to handle airline complaints. However, the Air Transport Portal of the European Commission handles airline complaints from member countries.

== See also ==
- Transportation Security Administration
- Air safety
- Airport security
