= Basic economy class =

Type of airfare offered by airlines

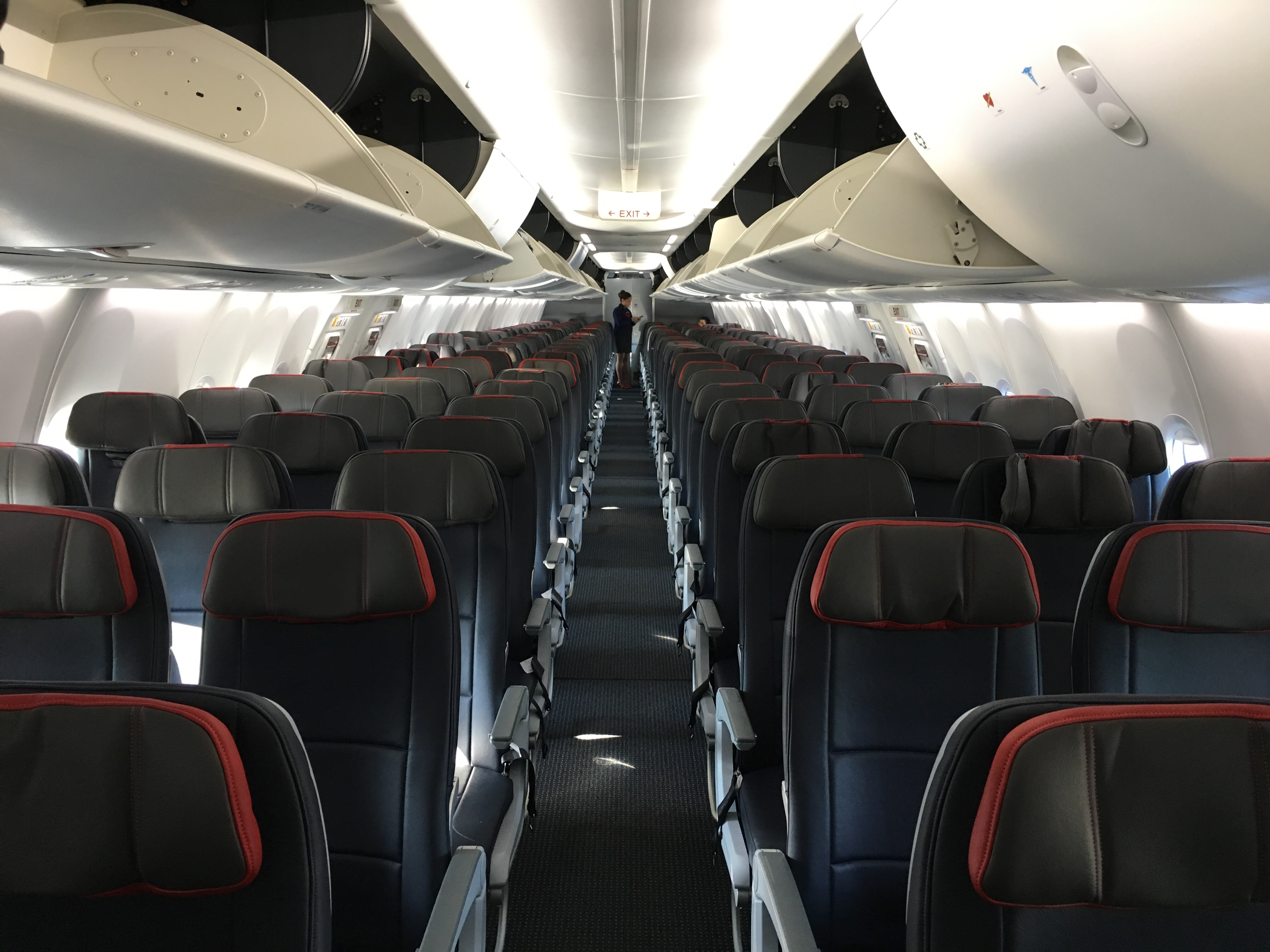
The economy class cabin of an American Airlines Boeing 737 MAX

Basic economy class is a travel class offered by a number of airlines. The class has superseded economy class as the cheapest airfare option for passengers and generally comes with more restrictions when compared to standard economy fares. Restrictions vary between different airlines, but they generally include not allowing passengers to change or cancel tickets or select seats for free. They are seen as a strategy for market segmentation.

In the United States, Delta Air Lines was the first airline to introduce basic economy fares in 2012. Following Delta's launch of such fares, United Airlines, American Airlines, Alaska Airlines, JetBlue, Hawaiian Airlines and Southwest Airlines have all introduced some version of basic economy, though the restrictions of each airline vary. Outside the United States, several airlines have introduced fares with similar restrictions under different names, such as hand baggage only or hand luggage only fares.

Basic economy fares were introduced by legacy carriers to compete more effectively with ultra-low-cost carriers (ULCCs), incorporating elements of the ULCC model of offering very low base fares supplemented by additional fees for nearly every service. At the same time, airlines increased capacity through new aircraft deliveries, adding more seats to sell at lower fares while expanding premium cabins to generate higher-margin revenue. The strategy proved effective, as many passengers shifted from ULCCs to legacy carriers when basic economy fares were competitively priced, drawn by broader route networks, higher frequency, and perceptions of better reliability and service. Competitive pressure from basic economy fared was among the factors cited in the bankruptcy of Spirit Airlines, the largest ULCC in the U.S.

The introduction of basic economy fares was generally met with negative reactions from consumers and travel writers, similar to criticism directed at the ULCC model for perceived "nickel-and-diming" through additional fees and restrictions. Many publications and analysts characterized basic economy as a form of market segmentation designed to encourage passengers to pay higher fares for standard economy tickets in order to avoid restrictions associated with basic economy, thereby generating additional revenue for airlines.

== Purpose ==
Basic economy class fares have been widely described as a market segmentation strategy for airlines to upsell customers to more expensive fares, instead of a product that airlines want customers to purchase. Former British Airways pricing executive Jeremy Quek described basic economy as "just another product that airlines are using to further segment the marketplace". Writing for Bloomberg News, Justin Bachman argued that basic economy fares cause passengers to pay more to fly, and that airlines increase revenue by increasing standard economy fares while introducing basic economy, causing customers to trade up to standard economy. Bachman described this phenomenon as "sleight-of-hand marketing".

In Runway Girl Network, aviation writer Seth Miller argued that basic economy is not about helping airlines compete with LCCs, but instead is a way for airlines to increase incremental revenue. As evidence of the trend, Miller pointed out that while basic economy fares were initially confined to markets where full-service carriers compete with LCCs, they were subsequently expanded to domestic flights without LCC competition. He noted that basic economy works well at pressuring passengers to spend more money for the same product.

== By market ==
=== United States ===
In September 2018, the CAPA Centre for Aviation described basic economy fares as a "permanent fixture" in the United States market. The publication pointed out that segmented fares have been effective at increasing revenue for Delta Air Lines, American Airlines and United Airlines—three of the largest international airlines in the United States. CAPA further noted that the resulting larger pool of lower fares has placed pressure on the revenue growth of Spirit Airlines and Frontier Airlines, two ultra-low-cost carriers.

==== Delta Air Lines ====
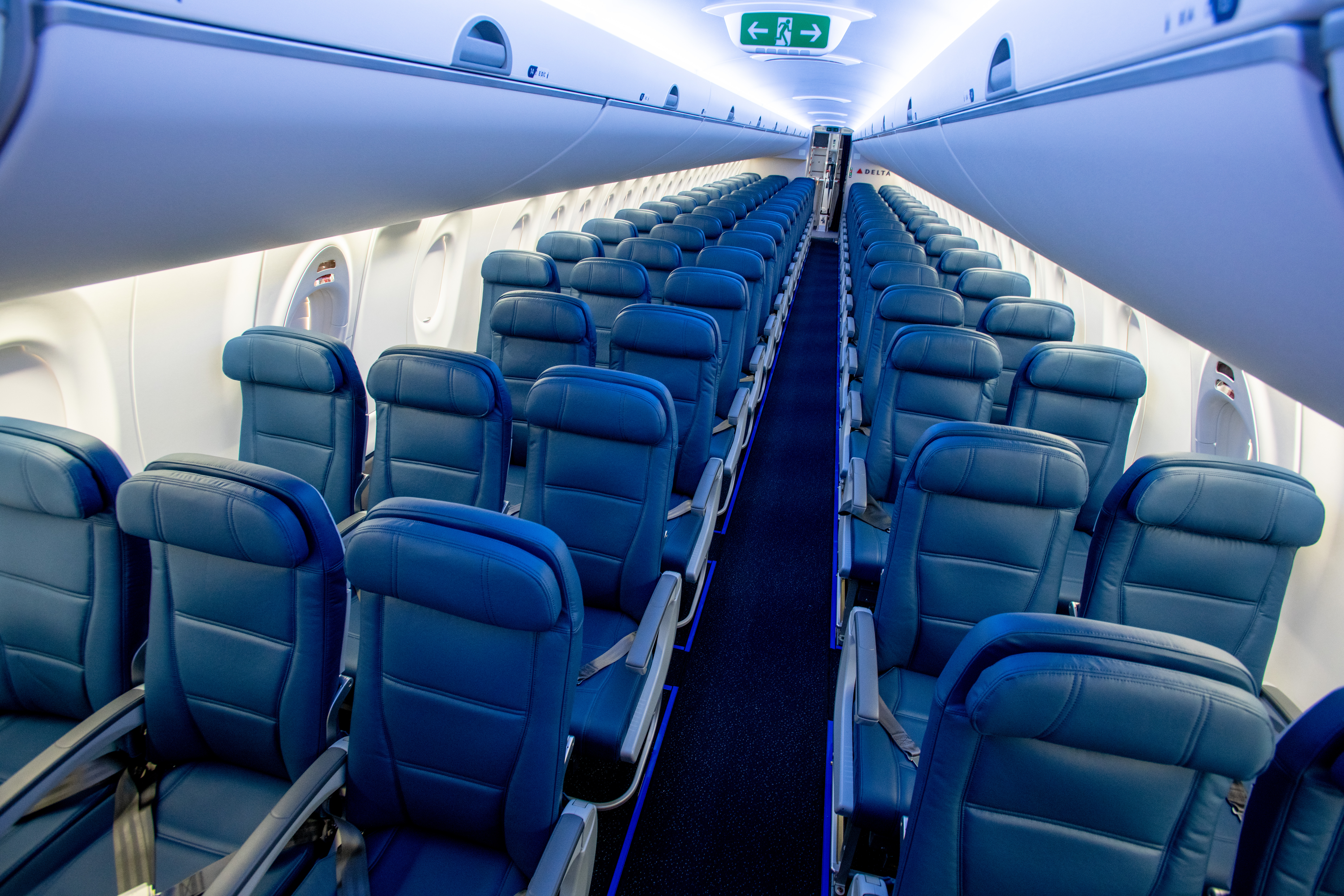
Delta Air Lines Airbus A220 economy class cabin

In 2012, Delta Air Lines became the first U.S. airline to introduce basic economy. Delta initially limited the availability of these fares to routes where it competed against LCC Spirit Airlines, calling basic economy its "Spirit-match fare" in its 2015 earnings call. The fares were available in 75 markets in early 2015 and 500 in early 2016. Delta subsequently expanded the fares to all 20,000 domestic markets, including routes where it faces no competition from LCCs. Delta president Glen Hauenstein noted that Delta received $20 million in extra revenue from basic economy fares from January to March 2016. Hauenstein also said that more than 50% of passengers bought up from basic economy to more expensive fares when they were presented with warnings about restrictions associated with basic economy during the sales process.

In October 2017, Delta executives said that they did not want customers to purchase basic economy fares, seeing the fares both as a defensive measure against low-cost airlines offering low fares, and as a way to lure prospective customers into buying more expensive options. In April 2018, Delta introduced basic economy on transatlantic flights. As of April 2019, basic economy passengers on Delta receive a free carry-on allowance, but are not allowed to select seats or change, cancel, or upgrade their ticket after purchase, regardless of elite status. Seats are assigned at check-in. In 2025, Delta rebranded its basic economy fare to be called 'Delta Main Basic', while retaining the same product as the previous name.

==== United Airlines ====
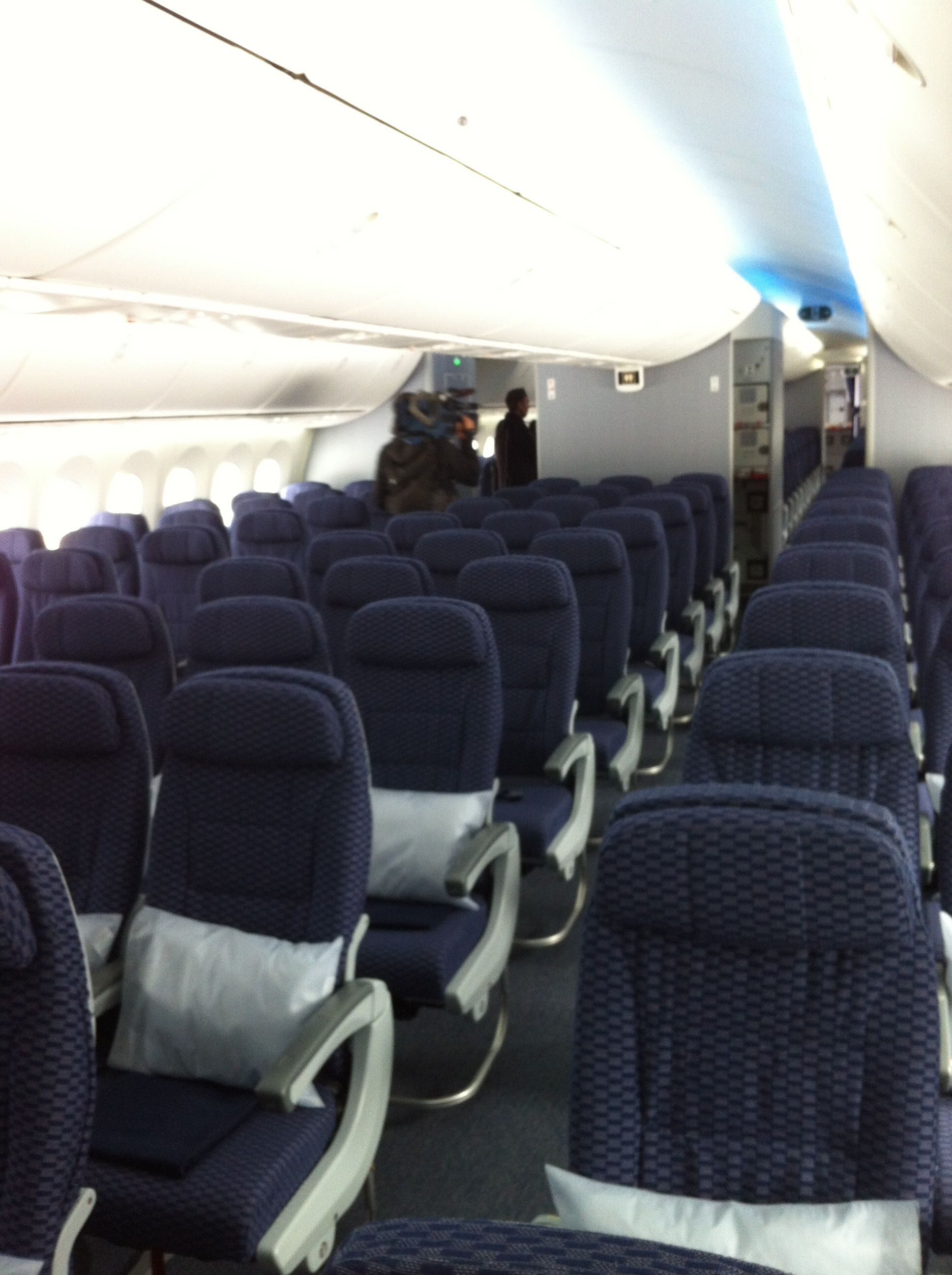
United Airlines Boeing 787 economy class cabin

United Airlines announced its basic economy fares in November 2016 and began selling basic economy tickets in early 2017. These fares do not include overhead baggage space or earn elite miles. Grant Martin of Skift described United's roll-out of basic economy fares as "the most widespread and aggressive" of the three major U.S. full-service carriers. In November 2017, United revealed plans to reduce its basic economy offerings due to revenue loss resulting from customers opting for other airlines that price-matched United without basic economy restrictions.

Despite the initial setback, United announced an expansion of basic economy fares in January 2018. In June 2018, the airline introduced basic economy on transatlantic flights, together with its joint venture partners Air Canada, Austrian Airlines, Brussels Airlines, Lufthansa and Swiss International Air Lines. United aimed to generate $1 billion in additional revenue by 2020 via cabin segmentation, including its basic economy fares and premium economy. Dave Bartels, vice president for pricing and revenue management at United, said that the airline never saw basic economy as a tool to compete against discount airlines, but instead is a "segmentation tool" to split more price-sensitive customers from those who are willing to pay extra for fewer restrictions.

As of April 2019, basic economy passengers on United do not receive overhead space for carry-on baggage and may only bring a personal item that fits under the seat in front, except for transatlantic flights where basic economy passengers continue to receive a carry-on baggage allowance. Changes and cancellations are not allowed, and basic economy fares earn half the elite qualifying miles compared to standard economy fares. Seat assignment up to 48 hours in advance is available for a fee. In October 2018, United CCO Andrew Nocella announced that the airline had no plans to change its carry-on baggage restriction, which is more restrictive compared to American and Delta.

==== American Airlines ====
American Airlines introduced basic economy fares for 10 markets in February 2017, following Delta and United. Initially, American did not provide basic economy passengers with free overhead space for carry-on baggage, except for its AAdvantage elite members, who still receive the standard free checked bag allowance. In April 2018, the airline introduced basic economy on transatlantic flights, including one free carry-on and the ability to select seats in advance for a fee, together with its joint venture partners British Airways, Iberia and Finnair. In September 2018, American re-introduced a free carry-on for basic economy passengers in addition to a personal item, a change the airline attributed to basic economy revenue not meeting expectations.

As of April 2019, basic economy passengers on American are allowed one free carry-on and may select seats for a fee within 48 hours of departure, but are placed in the last boarding group. Basic economy fares earn half the elite qualifying miles compared to standard economy fares. Upgrades and changes are not allowed. On international flights, seat selection and changes are available for a fee at any time after booking.

==== Alaska Airlines ====
In April 2018, Alaska Airlines announced its version of basic economy called Saver Fares, with the fares rolling out from January 2019. As of April 2019, basic economy fares on Alaska include a free carry-on allowance and free seat selection, but only for seats at the back of the aircraft. Changes and cancellations are not allowed after 24 hours of booking. In addition, basic economy passengers are the last to board.

==== JetBlue Airways ====
In October 2018, JetBlue Airways president Joanna Geraghty announced plans to introduce basic economy fares starting in late 2019, in response to competitors introducing basic economy on routes flown by JetBlue. This was introduced on November 12, 2019, referred to as a "Blue Basic" fare, and passengers were allowed to bring a carry-on bag. Blue Basic flyers board last, select a seat at check-in, cannot cancel or change flights, and earn fewer frequent flyer miles. In July 2021, JetBlue stopped allowing carry-on bags for customers in its Blue Basic class, but later reversed this decision in June 2024.

==== Hawaiian Airlines ====
Hawaiian Airlines announced plans to introduce basic economy fares in December 2018. On September 23, 2019, the airline launched its basic economy product, Main Cabin Basic, which is available on limited flights for travel dates starting from October 21. Main Cabin Basic passengers receive complimentary meals and are allowed to bring a standard carry-on bag and a personal item. However, they do not get advance seat assignments, are not allowed to make changes to flights and are the last to board.

==== Southwest Airlines ====
In March 2025, Southwest Airlines announced that it would begin selling basic economy fares from May 28, 2025, entailing the end of its two checked bags policy, and following its July 2024 announcement that it would end its open seating policy. Compared to its previous Wanna Get Away fare, passengers booking the airline's Basic fares would no longer have two checked bags included, would have flight credits from cancelled flights expire in 6 months, and can no longer change flights nor standby for same-day flight changes. In April 2025, the airline added that passengers booking its Basic fares from the third quarter of 2025 would be assigned a random seat at check-in 24 hours prior to departure and be the last to board, upon the airline adopting an assigned seating policy in early 2026.

=== Europe ===
Hand-baggage only fares are common across most European airlines on flights within Europe. Hugh Morris of The Daily Telegraph described the introduction of such fares by European airlines as following in the footsteps of major U.S. airlines who have introduced basic economy fares.

European full-service airlines that offer basic economy or hand-baggage only fares on transatlantic flights include:

- International Airlines Group airlines British Airways, Finnair, Iberia and Aer Lingus;
- Virgin Atlantic;
- Air France–KLM group airlines Air France and KLM;
- Alitalia; and
- Lufthansa Group airlines Lufthansa, Austrian Airlines, Brussels Airlines and Swiss International Air Lines.

These fares generally do not include a checked-baggage allowance and do not allow passengers to select seats in advance or make changes after booking. However, they do include a hand-baggage allowance and in-flight entertainment and meals. In addition to being a segmentation strategy, the introduction of such fares to transatlantic flights are also viewed as a way for full-service airlines to more effectively compete with long-haul LCCs such as Norwegian and WOW air.

==== United Kingdom ====
In 2016, British Airways introduced its basic economy fares, which do not include checked baggage, on European routes. These fares allow two pieces of hand baggage. In December 2017, the airline introduced a group-boarding policy, which placed basic economy passengers in the last boarding group. In April 2018, British Airways expanded its basic economy fares to long-haul flights, including transatlantic flights and flights to other destinations. These fares include in-flight meals, allow two pieces of hand baggage and offer advance seat selection for a fee. The airline introduced these fares together with its joint venture partners American, Iberia and Finnair.

In March 2018, Virgin Atlantic introduced its hand-baggage only fares, as it changed its economy-class fare structure to provide three fare types. Its hand-baggage only offering, branded as Economy Light, does not include a checked-baggage allowance and free seat assignment.

=== Asia ===
In India, LCC SpiceJet introduced hand-baggage only fares in June 2015. These fares must be purchased at least 30 days in advance. They include a 7-kilogram (15 lb) hand-baggage allowance in addition to a personal item, but do not include free checked baggage. The airline's regular economy-class fares, which are more expensive, include checked baggage within the fare.

Abu Dhabi-based airline Etihad Airways introduced hand-baggage only fares on limited routes in September 2018, following a successful trial in late 2017. These fares include a hand-baggage allowance of 7 kilograms (15 lb), but not checked baggage.

Shanghai-based airline China Eastern Airlines introduced basic economy fares in July 2019. These fares do not allow refunds, changes, upgrades, advance seat assignments, online check-in or checked baggage. Passengers on these fares board last.

== Reception ==
Most corporations have prevented their employees from buying basic economy fares because of their limitations. For example, when cancellations occur, business travelers on basic economy cannot change to another flight and may have to purchase expensive last-minute tickets, eliminating any potential savings from the lower fares. Several airline pricing executives have noted that this corporate blockade is what airlines had hoped for, and that this strategy of product segmentation is effective at segregating business travelers from the most price-sensitive customers. Scott McCartney of The Wall Street Journal compared basic economy fares to other pricing strategies used by airlines to charge more from corporate travelers, such as Saturday-night stay requirements, advance-purchase requirements and frequent-flyer programs switching to giving miles based on airfare rather than distance traveled.

William J. McGee of Consumer Reports stated that basic economy fares "come with significant trade-offs", and that being unaware of the restrictions may result in additional fees that negate savings from the fare difference with standard economy. However, McGee noted that basic economy fares may still be preferable to cheaper fares on ultra-low-cost carriers due to more flights, newer aircraft and higher reliability offered by major airlines.

In response to a freedom of information request, the United States Department of Transportation released nearly 50 pages of customer complaints between May and September 2017, during which airlines widely rolled out basic economy fares. Barbara Peterson of Condé Nast Traveler observed that these complaints included passengers not knowing the airport check-in requirement, and online travel agencies not displaying limitations of basic economy fares to customers.
