= Spirit Airlines =

U.S. ultra-low-cost airline (1992–2026)

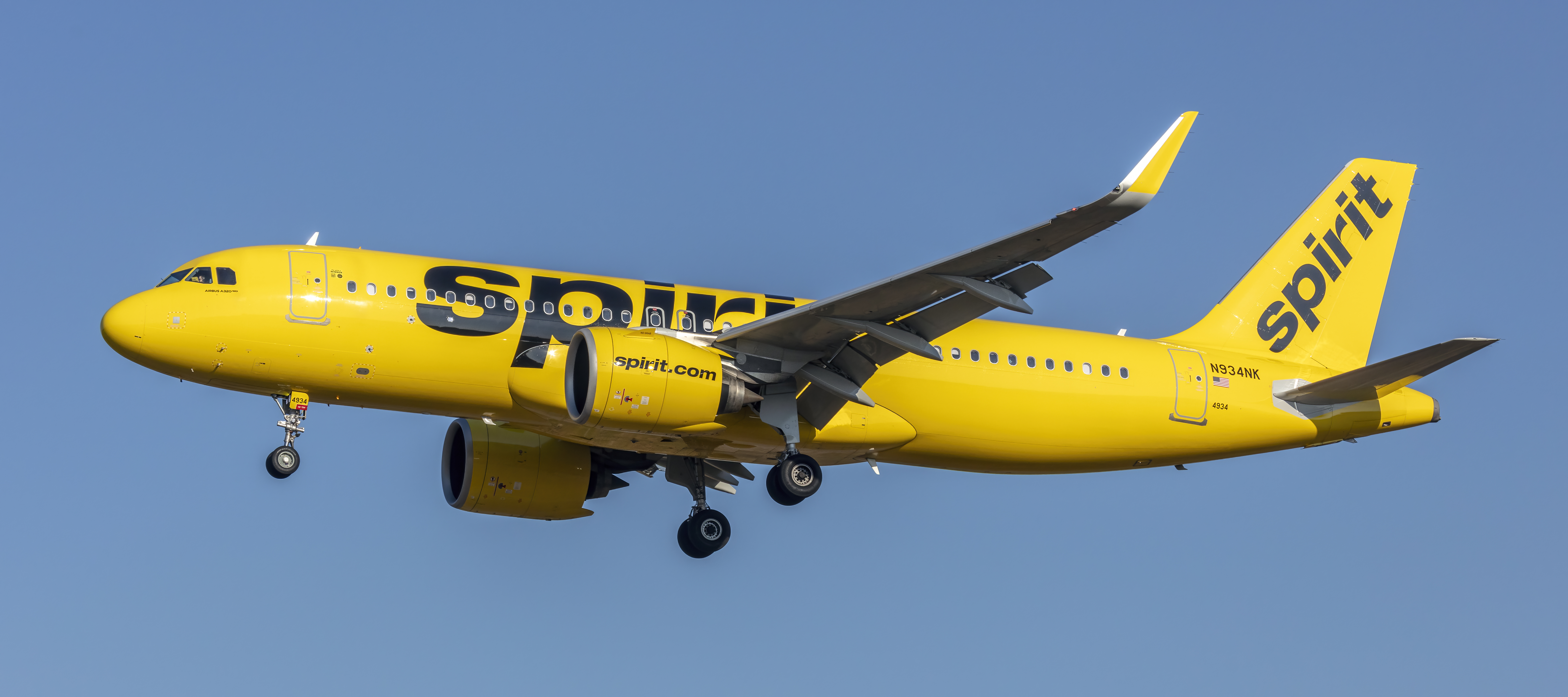
- Spirit Airlines Airbus A320neo
IATA	ICAO	Call sign
NK	NKS	SPIRIT WINGS
- Founded: 1964 (as Clippert Trucking Company)
- Commenced operations: 1983 (as Charter One Airlines); May 29, 1992 (as Spirit Airlines)
- Ceased operations: May 2, 2026
- AOC #: GTIA770S
- Operating bases: Atlanta; Chicago–O'Hare; Dallas/Fort Worth; Detroit; Fort Lauderdale; Houston–Intercontinental; Las Vegas; Miami; Los Angeles; Newark; Orlando
- Frequent-flyer program: Free Spirit
- Fleet size: 131 (December 2025)
- Destinations: 73 (at closing)
- Parent company: Spirit Aviation Holdings (2025–2026)
- Traded as: NYSE: SAVE
- Headquarters: Dania Beach, Florida, U.S.
- Key people: Dave Davis (president and CEO at closure)
- Revenue: ▼US$3.797 billion (2025)
- Operating income: ▲ −US$768.710 million (2025)
- Net income: ▼ −US$2.760 billion (2025)
- Total assets: ▼US$5.993 billion (2025)
- Total equity: ▼ −US$2.092 billion (2025)
- Employees: ▼7,482 (2025)
- Website: spirit.com at the Wayback Machine (archived May 2, 2026); spiritrestructuring.com at the Wayback Machine (archived May 2, 2026) (Note: Website used following Spirit Airlines' cessation of flight operations.)

Spirit Airlines was (Note: The operating company, formerly Spirit Airlines, Inc., was converted into Spirit Airlines, LLC in March 2025. The legal entity continued to exist following the airline's cessation of flight operations.) an American ultra-low-cost airline headquartered in Dania Beach, Florida. It operated scheduled flights throughout the United States, the Caribbean, and Latin America. In 2023, it was the seventh-largest passenger carrier in North America and the region's largest ultra-low-cost carrier. Spirit ceased all scheduled flight operations on May 2, 2026.

Spirit was founded in 1964 as a trucking company before transitioning to charter flights in 1983 and adopting the Spirit Airlines name in 1992. The company became known for introducing and expanding the ultra-low-cost carrier model in the United States, offering comparatively low base fares supplemented by additional charges for optional services. This approach supported its expansion among price-conscious leisure travelers but also left the airline sensitive to changes in operating costs and consumer demand. During the 2020s, Spirit faced increasing competition as legacy carriers expanded their basic economy offerings, while labor, aircraft, and operating costs rose.

In 2022, Frontier Airlines reached an agreement to acquire Spirit, but Spirit subsequently accepted a competing acquisition proposal from JetBlue. The proposed JetBlue merger was blocked by a federal judge in January 2024 following an antitrust lawsuit brought by the United States Department of Justice and several state attorneys general. The airlines subsequently terminated their merger agreement in March 2024.

Spirit filed for Chapter 11 bankruptcy protection in November 2024 and emerged from its initial financial restructuring in March 2025. As part of the reorganization, Spirit Airlines, Inc. was converted into Spirit Airlines, LLC, becoming a wholly owned subsidiary of the newly established Spirit Aviation Holdings, Inc. The company subsequently filed for Chapter 11 protection for a second time on August 29, 2025, amid continued financial and operational pressures.

On May 2, 2026, Spirit announced the immediate cessation of all flight operations following unsuccessful efforts to secure additional financing, including discussions regarding potential federal financial assistance. The company cited a material increase in oil prices and other business pressures as contributing factors in its decision. All scheduled flights were canceled effective immediately, ending more than three decades of operations under the Spirit Airlines name. The company subsequently began an orderly wind-down and liquidation of its aircraft and other assets under bankruptcy court supervision.

== History ==
=== From Clippert Trucking Company to Charter One Airlines ===
The company began in 1964 as Clippert Trucking Company. In 1974, it changed its name to Ground Air Transfer, Inc. In 1983, Ned Homfeld founded Charter One Airlines in Macomb County, Michigan, as a Detroit-based charter tour operator offering travel packages to destinations including Atlantic City, Las Vegas, and the Bahamas.

=== 1990s: Spirit Airlines, headquarters moved to Florida ===
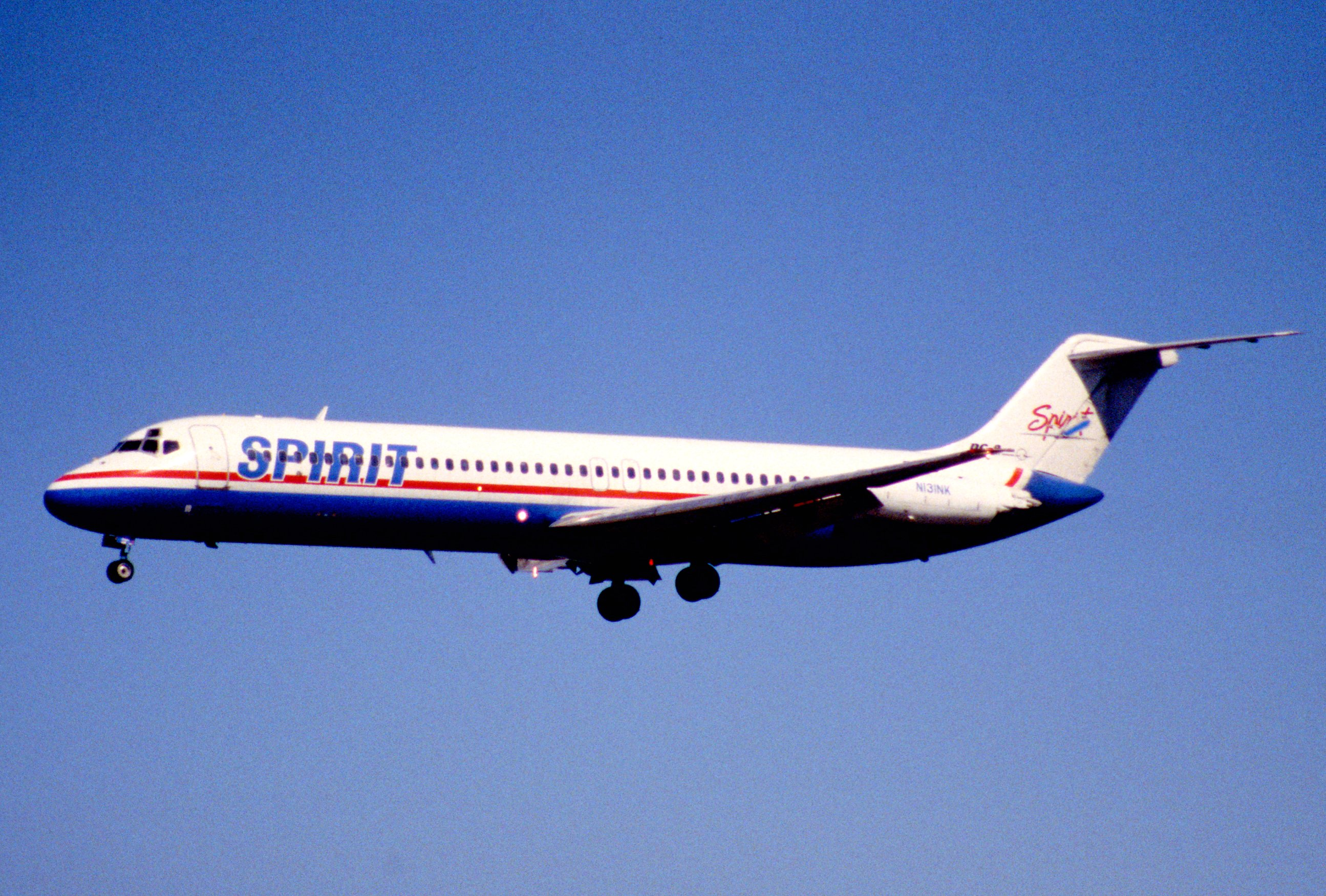
McDonnell Douglas DC-9 in 1998, painted in Spirit's first livery used from 1992 until 2002

In May 1992, the company introduced McDonnell Douglas DC-9 and McDonnell Douglas MD-80 jet aircraft and changed its name to Spirit Airlines. Spirit expanded from charter operations into scheduled service on June 1, 1992, with flights between Detroit and Atlantic City. Flights from Boston and Providence to Atlantic City followed on June 15. Through 1994, Spirit added scheduled service to Orlando, Fort Lauderdale, and St. Petersburg, Florida, Atlantic City and Fort Myers, Florida, and Philadelphia.

Spirit initially maintained its headquarters in the Kennedy Building in Eastpointe, Michigan, formerly East Detroit, in Metro Detroit. In December 1999, the airline moved its headquarters to Miramar, Florida. Before selecting Miramar, Spirit also considered Atlantic City and Detroit.

In the summer of 1994, Spirit canceled tickets for 1,400 customers following an overbooking incident. According to the airline, the issue resulted from incorrect instructions provided to travel agents, which caused some tickets to be treated as invalid despite customers having paid for them. In response to criticism, Spirit stated that it would accommodate all ticketed passengers, including by booking them on competing airlines if necessary.

In 1996, Janet Patton became Spirit Airlines' first female pilot. She became the airline's first female captain in 1998.

=== 2000s: Baldanza, ultra low-cost carrier, Caribbean ===
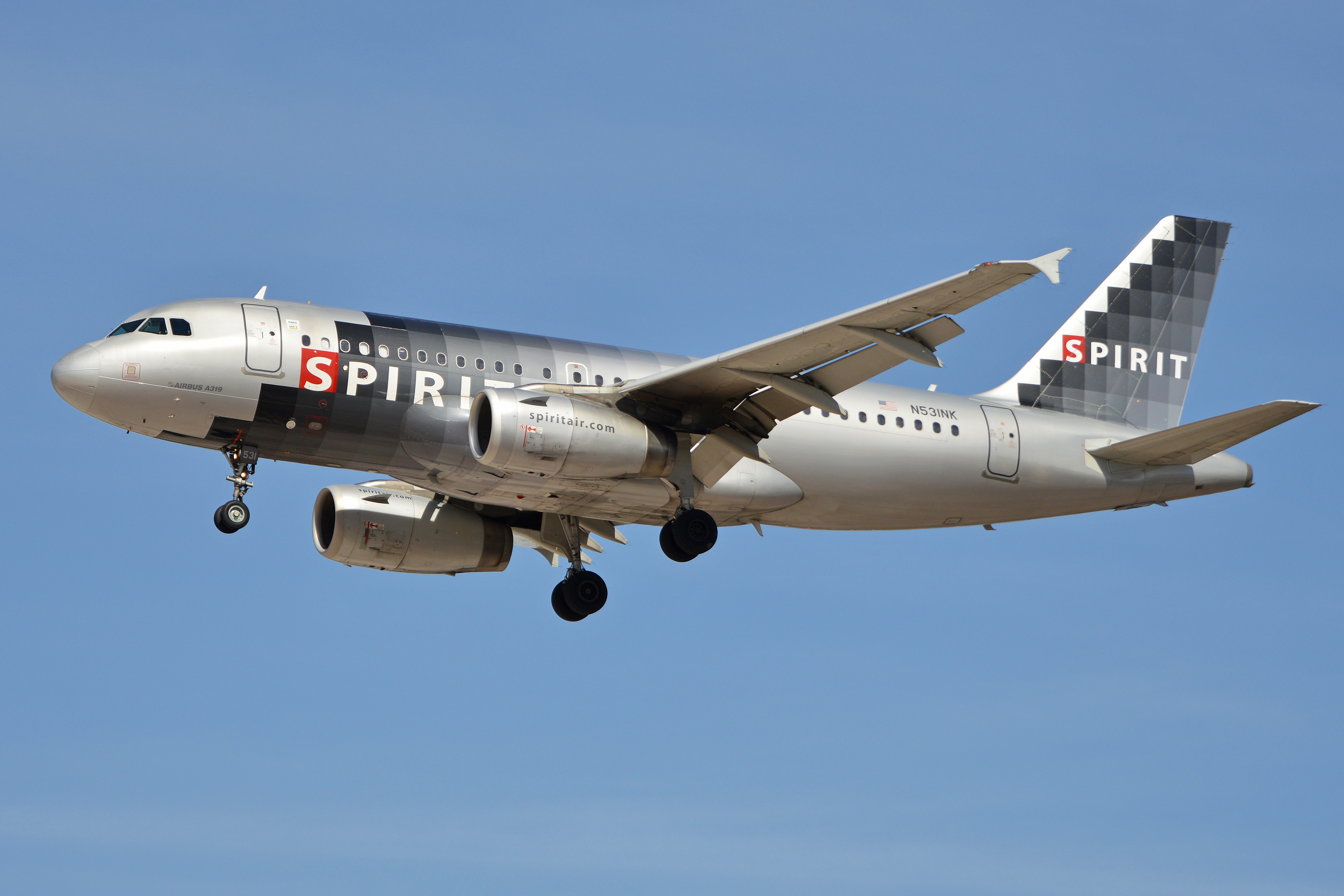
Airbus A319-100 in the grayscale livery used from 2002 until 2007

In 2005, Ben Baldanza was hired as president. Following an investment by Indigo Partners in 2006, Baldanza became CEO and assumed a larger role in the airline's operations and strategy. Under Baldanza, Spirit adopted an ultra-low-cost carrier business model modeled in part on Ireland's Ryanair, emphasizing very low base fares supplemented by additional fees for nearly every service.

While this strategy received significant media criticism, the airline continued to expand its customer base and revenue from optional services. Spirit also became known for advertising campaigns and promotional fares that used provocative humor and double entendres, including its "MILF" promotion, which stood for "Many Islands, Low Fares".

Spirit rapidly expanded its network throughout the 2000s, including service to destinations in the United States and the Caribbean, and filed applications for additional international routes, but the airline's focus on high aircraft utilization in an effort to keep operating costs down contributed to weak operational reliability and limited recovery options during disruptions.

The airline also faced regulatory and labor developments, including a 2000 Federal Aviation Administration fine for aircraft marking and placarding violations, and a 2010 pilot strike that temporarily grounded operations from June 10 to 18.

=== 2010s: Increased competition, two CEO changes ===
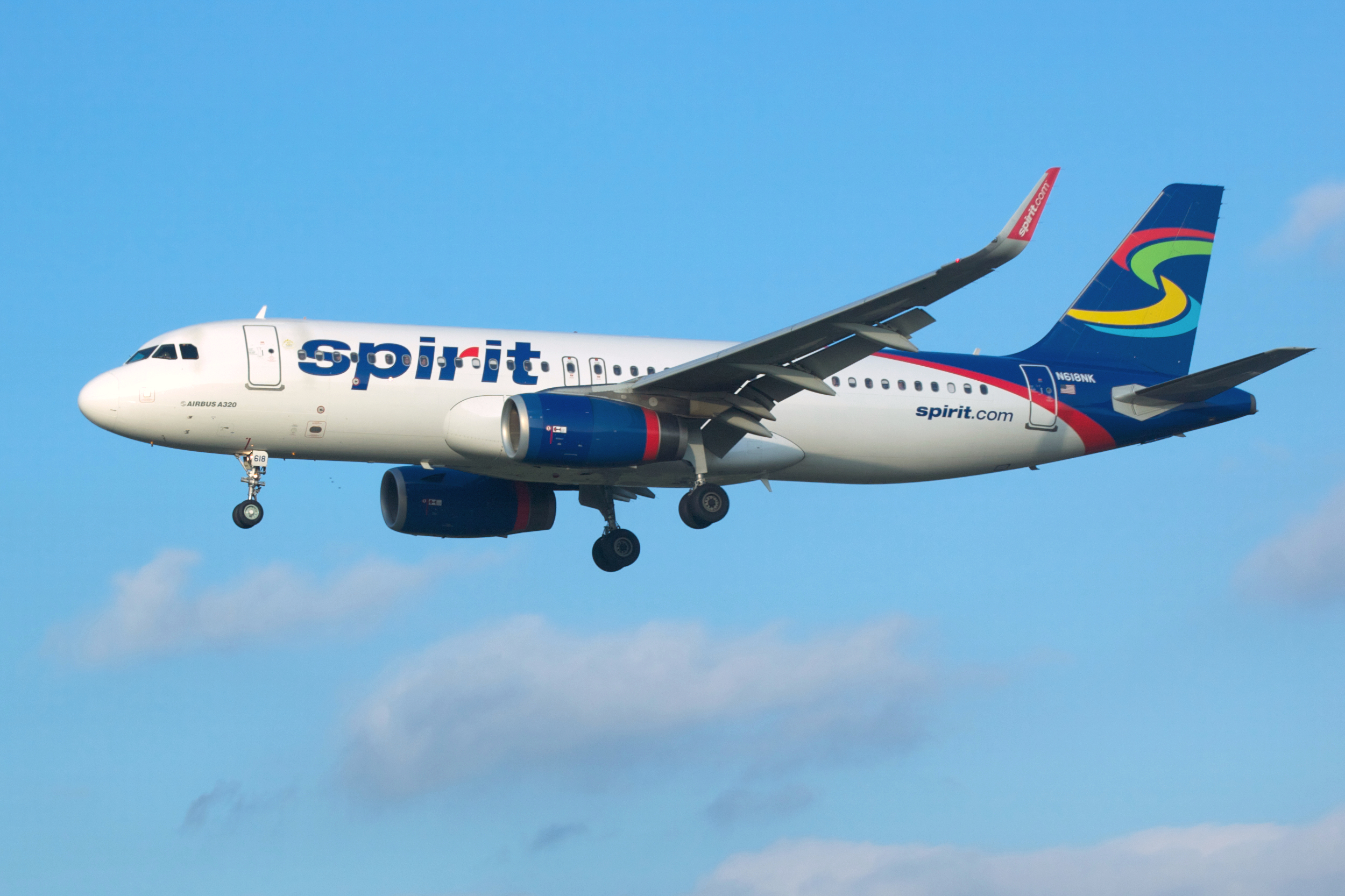
Airbus A320-200 in the blue livery used from 2007 until 2014

Spirit Airlines introduced a fee for carry-on baggage in 2010, the first U.S. airline to do so. Other U.S. ultra-low-cost carriers, including Allegiant Air and Frontier Airlines, later adopted similar charges. In 2012, the airline faced public criticism after declining to refund a fare to a terminally ill military veteran who had purchased a nonrefundable ticket. Spirit later issued an apology, refunded the fare, and made a donation to the Wounded Warrior Project.

During this period, Spirit faced increased competition from basic economy fares introduced by the legacy carriers, which incorporated elements of the ULCC model by offering low base fares supplemented with fees. Delta Air Lines introduced basic economy fares in 2012, and by the end of the decade all of the U.S. legacy carriers had implemented similar fare products. The strategy proved effective, as many passengers shifted toward legacy carriers when basic economy fares were competitively priced, drawn by broader route networks, higher frequency, and perceptions of better reliability and service.

Former AirTran Airways CEO Robert Fornaro succeeded Baldanza as CEO in 2016 and introduced initiatives aimed at improving operational performance and customer service, including collaboration with the Disney Institute. During this period, Spirit continued to expand its network and maintained its ancillary fee-based pricing model. By 2017, Spirit's on-time performance had improved compared with earlier years, ranking among U.S. carriers by that metric. In 2018, the airline began equipping its fleet with Wi-Fi service.

Ted Christie succeeded Fornaro as CEO in January 2019 and led Spirit to make significant capital investment announcements in 2019, including that it would move into a newly built headquarters in Dania Beach, Florida, and acquire 100 new Airbus A320neo family aircraft.

=== 2020s: Decline and bankruptcy ===
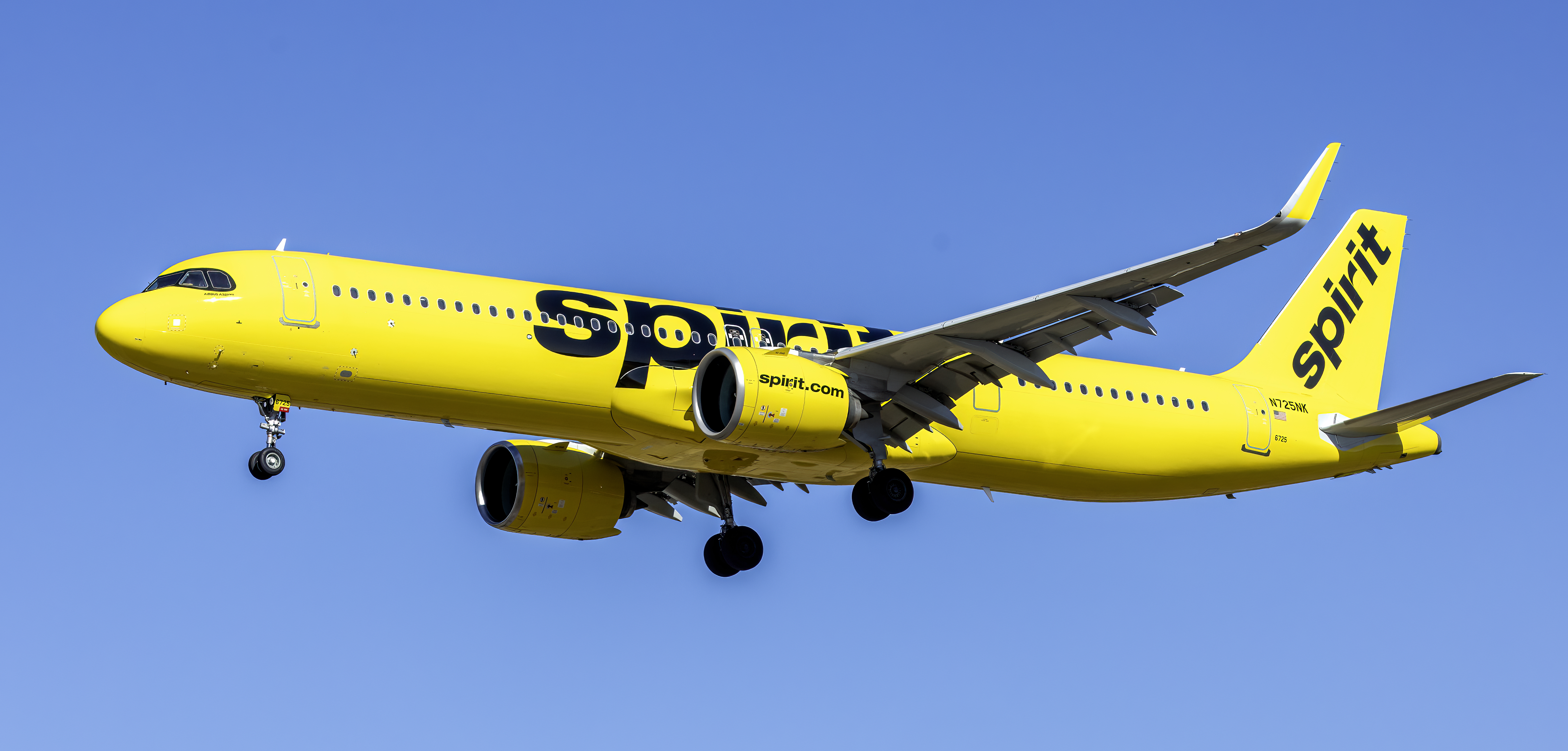
Airbus A321neo in the yellow livery used from 2014 until 2026

At the start of the COVID-19 pandemic, Spirit Airlines received $334 million in assistance through the Coronavirus Aid, Relief and Economic Security (CARES) Act in the form of grants and loans. However, since CARES Act funds were allocated based on employment levels in mid-2019, companies experiencing rapid pre-pandemic growth, including Spirit, did not receive the same level of support as more stable competitors. The funds were used to support payroll through September 30, 2020. In July 2020, the company announced plans to place 20–30% of employees on furlough beginning in October. Some pilots and flight attendants later accepted voluntary leave or reduced schedules to limit layoffs.

During the post-pandemic recovery, Spirit faced increased competition as legacy carriers expanded basic economy fares and added capacity. Spirit also faced higher labor costs as airlines increased compensation to attract and retain pilots following pandemic-related retirements. The company never posted a profit after 2019.

In August 2023, the airline converted an order for 31 Airbus A319neo into the larger A321neo. Spirit's order had made up a third of all A319neo orders, briefly putting the type's future in question.

In January 2025, Spirit Airlines laid off 200 employees as part of cost reduction measures. In April 2025, Spirit Airlines exited Chapter 11 bankruptcy and appointed Dave Davis as CEO.

==== Attempted mergers and bankruptcy ====
Since 2022, various competing low-cost airlines announced plans to acquire Spirit. In February 2022, Frontier Airlines announced its intention to acquire Spirit, pending regulatory approval, with Frontier Airlines stock as the surviving entity. The deal would have made the combined airline the fifth-largest airline in the U.S. In July 2022, Spirit's shareholders rejected Frontier's offer.

In April 2022, JetBlue proposed to acquire Spirit for $33 per share in cash, equivalent to $3.6 billion. In May, Spirit said its board of directors had decided not to consider JetBlue's proposal. According to Spirit Airlines, JetBlue's proposed acquisition would be unlikely to be approved by the U.S. Department of Justice's Antitrust Division, because it would likely believe that an ultra-low-cost carrier being purchased by a higher-fare airline would increase fares for consumers. Spirit noted that the Antitrust Division was looking into JetBlue's strategic partnership with American Airlines for the same reason.

That July, JetBlue reached an agreement to purchase Spirit for $33.50 per share, with additional inducements for Spirit shareholders. The deal would have made the unified company the fifth-largest airline based in the United States. Spirit shareholders voted to approve the deal but the Department of Justice sued to block it, alleging that the merger would result in "higher fares, fewer seats, and harm millions of consumers". The trial began in October 2023, and at its conclusion, a federal judge blocked JetBlue's acquisition of Spirit Airlines on January 16, 2024, stating that the deal was anticompetitive towards other airline corporations and would harm consumers. As a result, Spirit Airlines' stock fell by approximately 47% and the airline expressed concern over its future. Speculators predicted that Spirit may have to file for Chapter 11 bankruptcy protection, followed by a liquidation process, if the airline could not come up with a growth plan. However, on January 18, Spirit denied these speculations, saying that the company has no plans to file for bankruptcy and was looking for new plans to maintain its future. JetBlue ended its takeover attempt on March 4, 2024, after federal judge William G. Young ruled the move would reduce competition.

In November 2024, Spirit announced that it was preparing to file for Chapter 11 bankruptcy protection. The company's stock dropped over 50%, and quarterly results were not to be revealed due to the announcement. On November 18, it filed for Chapter 11, listing assets and liabilities between $1 billion and $10 billion. The company blamed mounting losses, failed merger agreements, increasing debt, and high competition. The company was to continue operating through the bankruptcy, from which it expected to emerge by the beginning of 2025. As a result of the bankruptcy filing, Spirit Airlines was delisted from the NYSE.

Frontier Airlines again offered to purchase the airline in January. Spirit rejected the offer of $2.1 billion in stock and cash, which would have also required Spirit's creditors to invest $350 million. The offer was significantly lower than the $2.9 billion merger deal the airlines had announced in early 2022. Despite rejecting the initial offer, Spirit said it would welcome further negotiations with Frontier.

By the spring of 2025, Spirit had emerged from Chapter 11 bankruptcy protection after finalizing its debt and having its take-private bankruptcy plan approved in February. However, in August, Spirit announced that it was running short of cash and may not be able to stay in business for another year. On August 29, 2025, it filed for Chapter 11 bankruptcy for the second time in less than a year, as part of a plan to reduce its fleet and stabilize its position.

To combat the airline's financial issues, Spirit began a series of layoffs. In September, Spirit announced it was planning to furlough one-third of its flight attendants—affecting around 1,800 people. The announcement came a week after the company said it planned to reduce flying capacity by 25% in its November schedule. In October, Spirit Airlines revealed further details of its "shrink-to-shine" restructuring plan, including a plan to furlough 365 pilots and downgrade up to 170 additional pilots in the first quarter of 2026 as part of broader efforts to restore profitability, including a projected net profit of $219 million in 2027.

On April 15, 2026, reports indicated that Spirit Airlines was at risk of imminent liquidation as surging jet fuel prices—driven sharply higher by the 2026 Iran war—deepened the carrier's already severe financial distress. The conflict‑related spike in global oil markets pushed fuel costs to levels that Spirit's ultra‑low‑cost model could not absorb, compounding the airline's ongoing losses from high debt, labor expenses, and intense fare competition. By April 18, the airline was actively seeking a federal bailout in an effort to avoid liquidation, and later that month the Trump administration said it was considering acquiring a controlling stake in the company.

==== End of operations ====
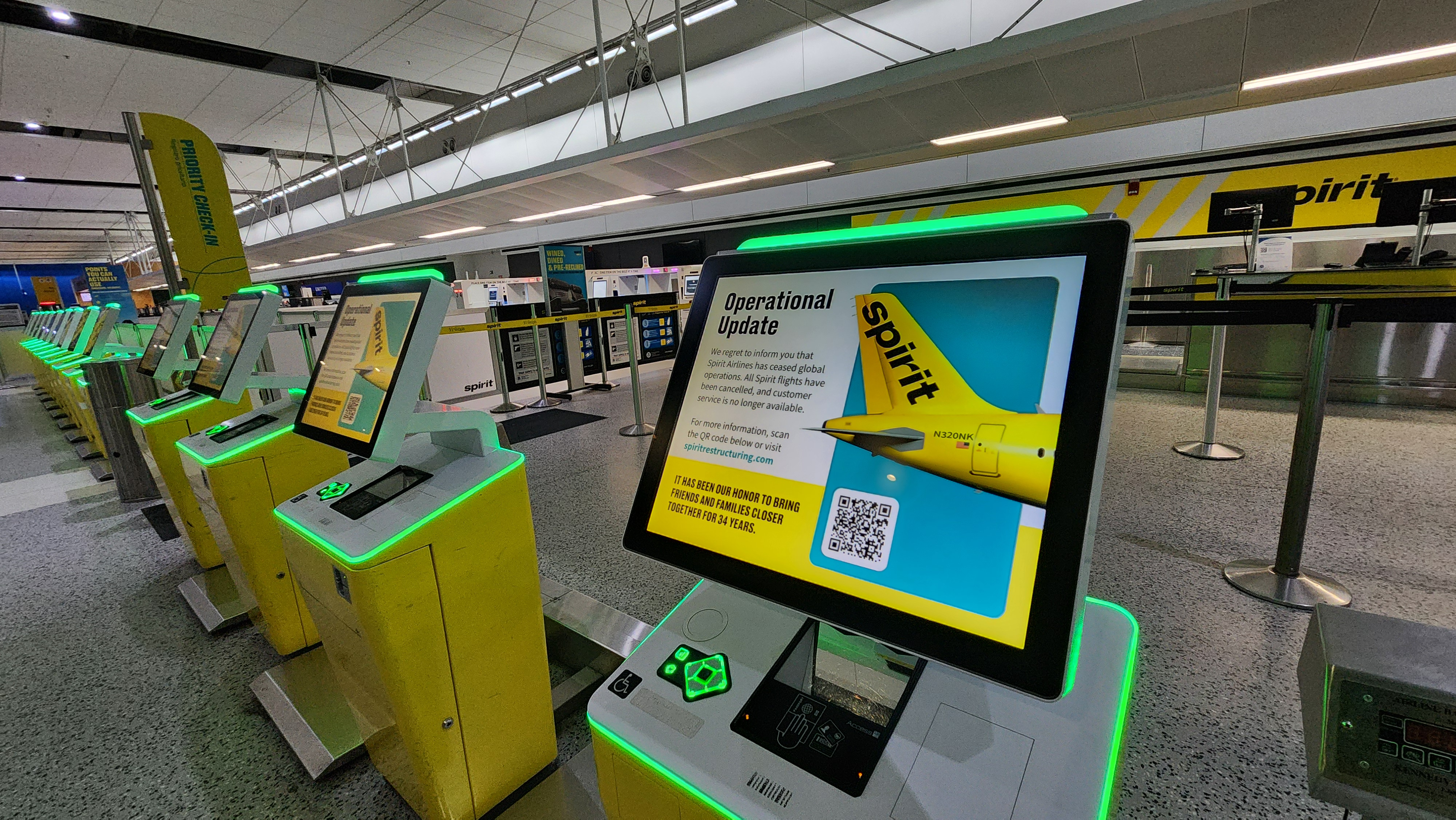
Spirit check-in kiosk at Detroit Metropolitan Airport informing passengers of Spirit's closure

The airline ceased operations on May 2, 2026, at 3:00 a.m. EDT after bailout negotiations between its creditors and the Trump administration collapsed. The airline blamed sharply rising fuel costs associated with the 2026 Iran war for the shutdown decision, though the carrier was already in a weakened financial position following years of losses, failed merger attempts, and two Chapter 11 bankruptcy filings. The final Spirit Airlines flight landed in Dallas–Fort Worth shortly after midnight on May 2, 2026, after its trip from Detroit.

Spirit said that it would automatically issue refunds for tickets customers had purchased directly from the airline, but that tickets purchased through third-party booking platforms were subject to separate refund processes. Following the shutdown, several airlines introduced discounted "rescue fares" for affected passengers, and U.S. carriers extended travel accommodations to Spirit employees seeking to return home and, in some cases, offered or pledged to offer expedited or priority consideration in hiring. Former employees have proposed a class action suit, claiming the airline did not provide proper notice of termination as required by the WARN Act.

Several Spirit pilots were mobilized to move former Spirit aircraft to long-term storage by Nomadic Aviation Group.

In August 2026, Google won a bankruptcy auction for a de-identified archive of Spirit Airlines' internal business data, including employee and workplace data, with a bid of $10 million; Mercor was named the alternate bidder at $7.5 million. The sale requires the approval of the bankruptcy court; as of November 2026 it had not been approved, and the hearing on it had been adjourned to November 17, 2026. The Association of Flight Attendants filed a lawsuit against the sale, arguing that it failed to protect employees' personally identifying information. On October 8, 2026, a bipartisan group of U.S. lawmakers led by Representative Steven Horsford and Senator Elizabeth Warren raised privacy concerns about Google's proposed $10 million purchase of Spirit Airlines' internal data for artificial intelligence training citing records included approximately 100 million emails, 500 million Microsoft Teams messages and employee information, and warned that de-identification might not adequately protect workers' privacy.

== Corporate affairs ==
=== Business trends ===
The key trends for Spirit Airlines were (as of the end of the calendar year):

Year	Revenue, in million US$	Net profit/(loss), in million US$	Employees (FTE)	Passengers (in millions)	Load factor (%)	Aircraft	Ref.
2010	781	73	2,192	7.0	82.1	32	
2011	1,071	77	2,456	8.5	85.6	37	
2012	1,318	109	2,767	10.4	85.2	52	
2013	1,654	177	3,224	12.4	86.6	54	
2014	1,932	225	3,722	14.3	86.7	65	
2015	2,141	317	4,326	17.9	84.7	79	
2016	2,320	263	5,159	21.6	84.7	95	
2017	2,644	416	6,100	24.2	83.1	112	
2018	3,323	156	7,110	29.3	83.9	128	
2019	3,831	335	8,938	34.5	84.4	145	
2020	1,810	(429)	8,756	18.4	69.7	157	
2021	3,230	(473)	9,218	30.8	78.8	173	
2022	5,068	(554)	11,107	38.5	81.9	194	
2023	5,362	(447)	12,798	44.1	81.3	205	
2024	4,812	(1,230)	11,331	44.2	82.4	213	
2025	3,720	(2,833)	7,482	32.0	78.4	131	

=== Ownership ===
Spirit Airlines, Inc., was a Delaware corporation that was publicly traded on the New York Stock Exchange until its bankruptcy filing in 2024.

=== Headquarters ===
In 2019, the airline announced that it would move to new headquarters of up to 500,000 square feet (46,000 m^{2}) in the Dania Pointe development in Dania Beach, Florida, spending $250 million. The airline anticipated the facility would house 1,000 employees. The Dania Pointe headquarters opened for business in April 2024.

Previously, Spirit had been headquartered at 2800 Executive Way, Miramar, Florida, having moved there from its previous Eastpointe location in 1999. As of 2016, there were 600 employees located in the office. Chris Sloan of Airways Magazine stated that the building was "nondescript low slung". Sloan added that the interior, prior to a 2014 renovation, was, "To put it charitably, [...] a dump", but that employees felt ownership over the office.

Following Spirit's closure, the Broward County Board of County Commissioners voted in May 2026 to explore purchasing the building.

On August 13, 2026, DPC HoldCo, an affiliate of Boston-based investment firm, Hill City Capital, bought the Spirit HQ for 93.25 million dollars in cash after the bid submission got accepted as part of the auction hosted on August 11th.

=== Business model ===
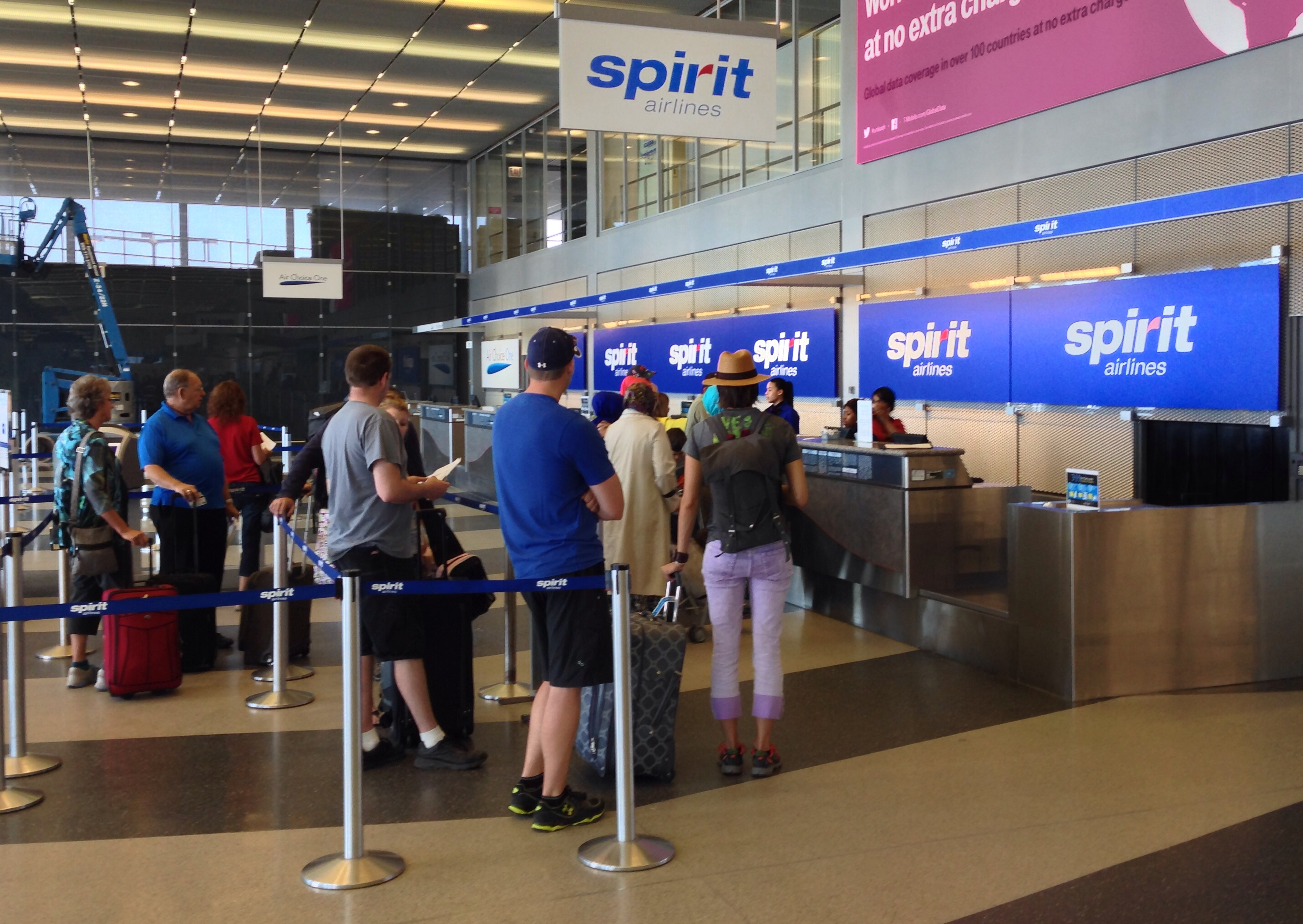
A Spirit check-in counter at O'Hare International Airport in 2014. As an ultra low-cost carrier, Spirit charged fees for many services, including printing boarding passes with an agent and checking luggage.

Under CEO Ben Baldanza, Spirit began a transition to an ultra low-cost carrier, following a fare model involving charging for amenities often included in the base ticket price of traditional carriers. Passengers who wanted to customize their itinerary or seat selection paid an add-on fee for each additional feature, enabling the carrier to earn ancillary revenue in excess of 40% of total revenue. These included having an agent print a boarding pass at check-in versus doing it online or at a kiosk, fees for large carry-on or checked bags, and progressive fees for overweight bags, selected seat assignments, travel insurance and more.

=== Frequent-flyer program ===
Spirit Airlines had a three-tier frequent-flyer program called Free Spirit.

=== Controversy ===
Spirit Airlines had been the subject of numerous complaints, and punitive actions by the U.S. Department of Transportation (DOT). Most of the claims against the company were for allegations of deceptive advertising practices, customer service, and the airline's charging additional fees at the time of purchase as a matter of policy:

- In November 2011, the DOT fined Spirit $43,900 for alleged deceptive advertising practices. The complaint claimed that the airline had been running an advertising campaign which promoted specific discounted fares on billboards, posters, and Twitter, but did not disclose full details of extra fees charged in addition to the advertised rates.
- In January 2012, the DOT fined Spirit $100,000 for mishandling complaints related to its treatment of customers with disabilities.
- In 2013 and 2015, the DOT received more passenger complaints about Spirit than any other airline. The rate of complaints was "dramatically higher" than the overall rate for the industry.
- In February 2018, a 21-year-old passenger flushed her hamster down a toilet in an airport bathroom, after the company refused to let her take the hamster on the flight. The passenger was misinformed by a reservation representative that she could bring the emotional support animal. She said that a flight attendant suggested that she flush the hamster down the toilet, which the airline denied.
- On August 3, 2021, Spirit Airlines canceled 40% of its flights, leaving travelers stranded because it had no arrangements with other airlines to book its passengers on other airlines' flights. Spirit Airlines said, "We're working around the clock to get back on track in the wake of some travel disruptions over the weekend due to a series of weather and operational challenges. We needed to make proactive cancellations to some flights across the network, but the majority of flights are still scheduled as planned." By August 10, the schedule was stabilizing.
- In June 2023, a passenger was forced to urinate on the floor of a galley after cabin crew persistently denied her bathroom access for over two hours. The flight attendant filmed the incident and called the smell of her urine offensive.

== Destinations ==
US states, countries and dependencies served by Spirit Airlines prior to bankruptcy.

Spirit's route network combined extensive domestic service within the United States with international leisure routes across Mexico, Central America, the Caribbean, and South America. International destinations included Cancún, Bogotá, Medellín, Lima, San José, San Juan, and Santo Domingo.

=== Interline agreements ===
Spirit had interline agreements with French Bee and Norse Atlantic Airways.

== Fleet ==
=== Final fleet ===
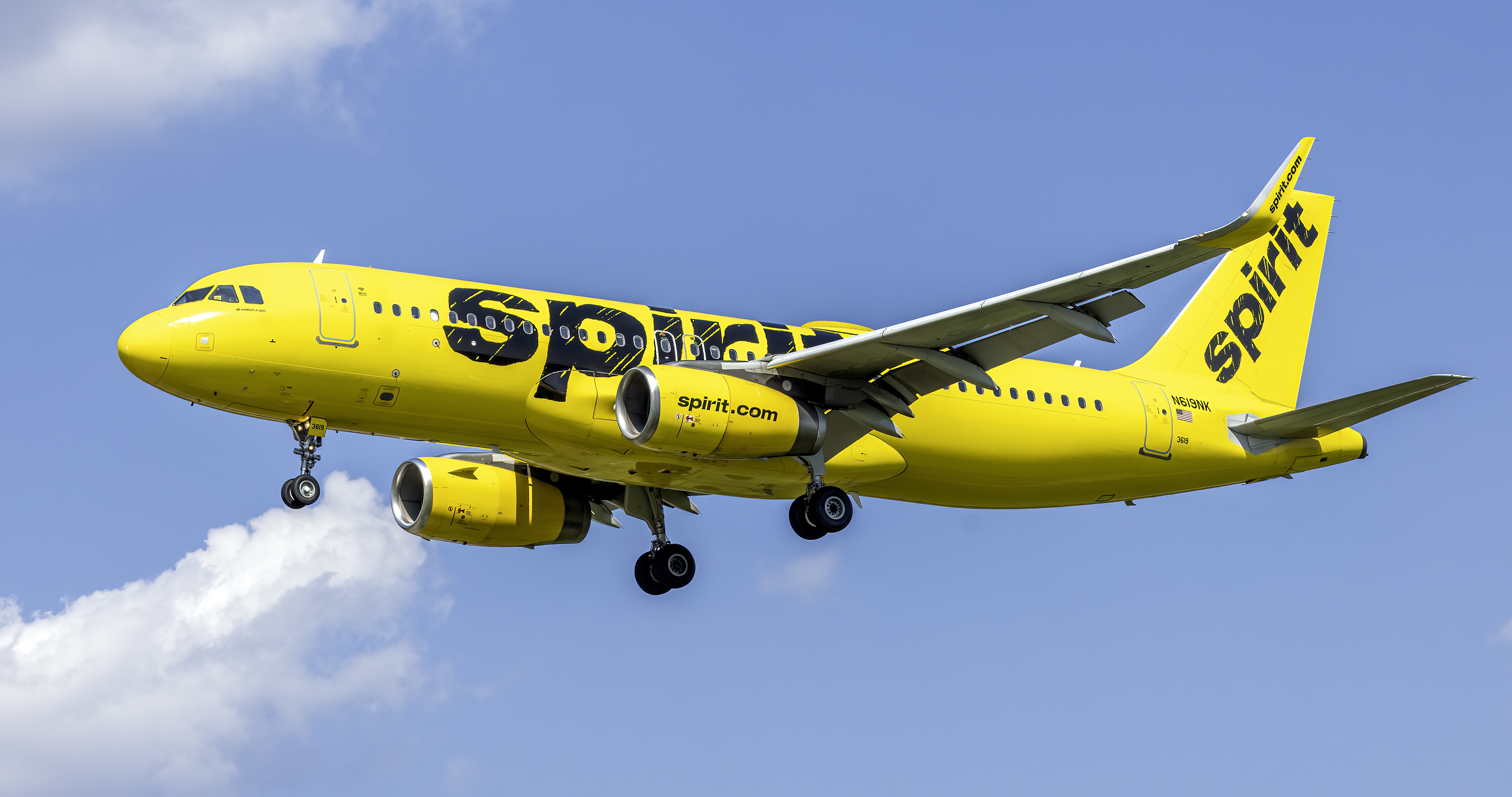
Spirit Airbus A320-200

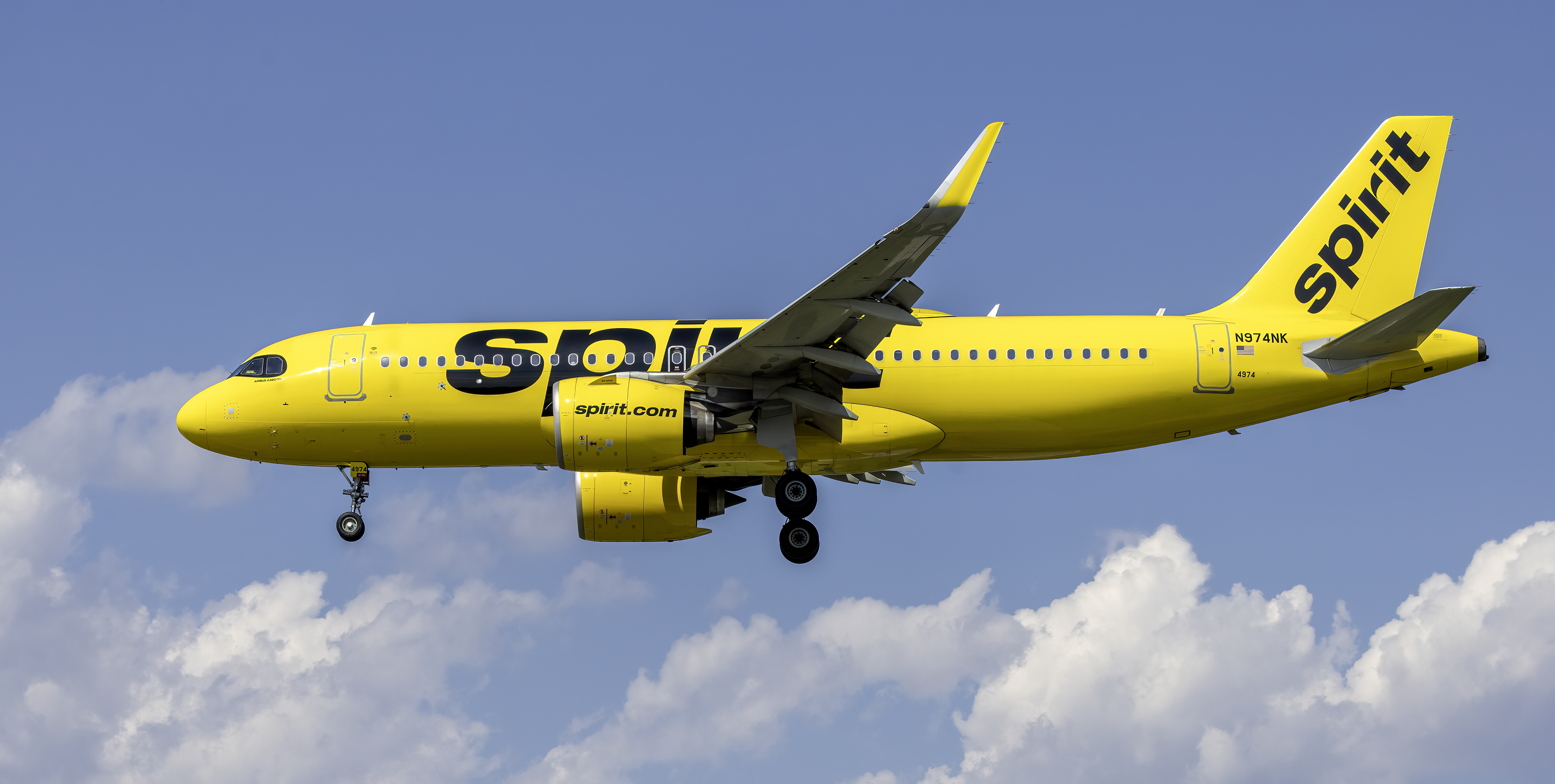
Spirit Airbus A320neo

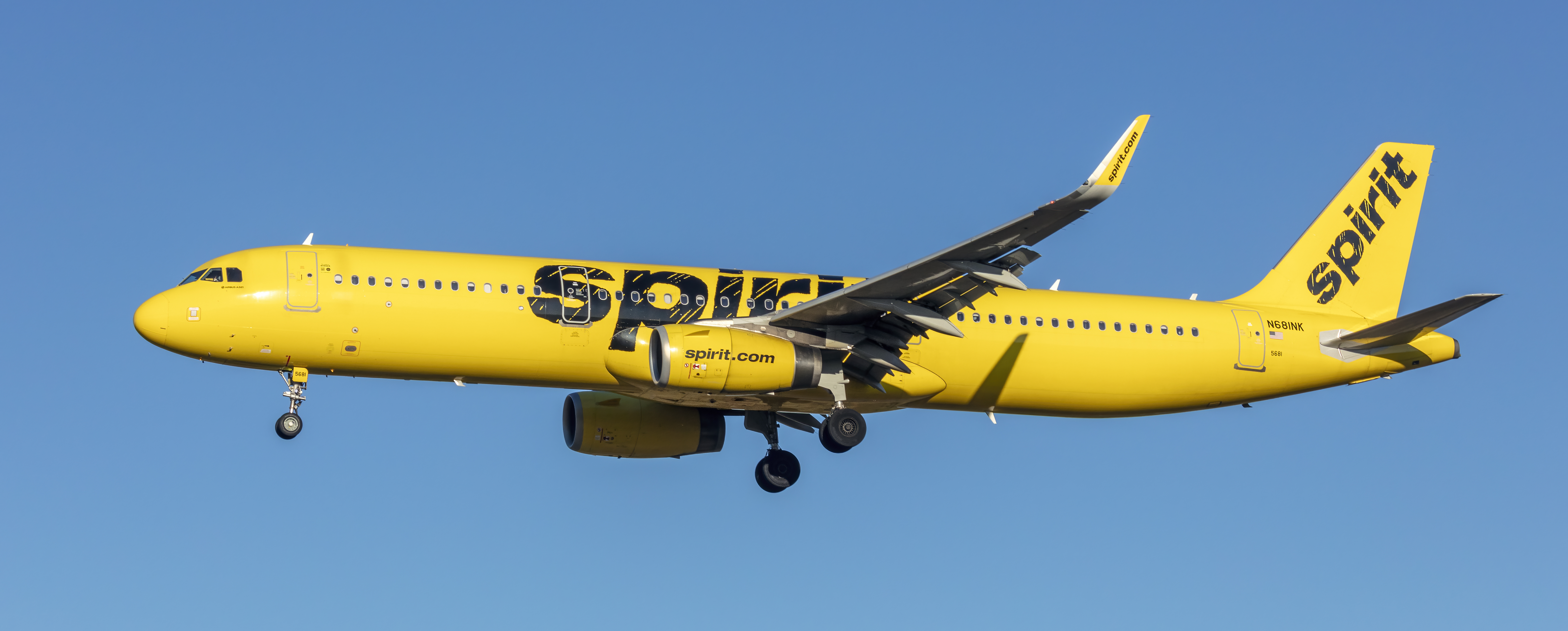
Spirit Airbus A321-200

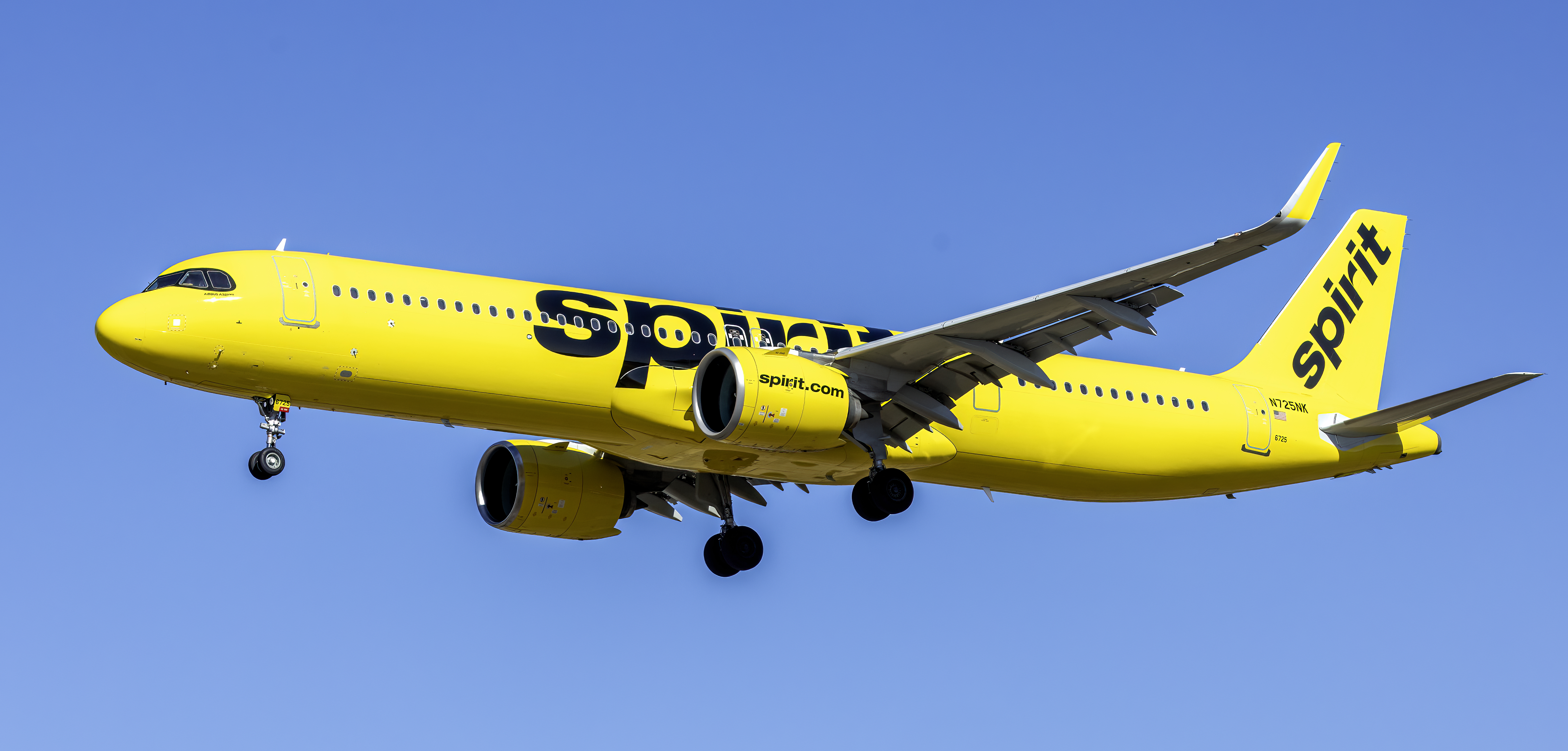
Spirit Airbus A321neo

As of December 2025, the final Spirit Airlines fleet consisted of an all-Airbus A320 family fleet. Spirit operated the following aircraft at the time of ceasing operations:

Aircraft	In service	Orders	Passengers				Notes
Aircraft	In service	Orders	J	W	Y	Total	Notes
Airbus A320-200	62	—	8	42	126	176	
Airbus A320-200	62	—	8	12	156	176	
Airbus A320neo	19	—	8	42	126	176	
Airbus A320neo	19	—	8	12	156	176	
Airbus A321-200	29	—	8	12	209	229	
Airbus A321neo	21	—	8	42	179	229	
Total	131	—					

=== Historical fleet ===
Throughout its history, Spirit Airlines operated the following aircraft types:

Spirit Airlines historical fleet
Aircraft	Total	Introduced	Retired	Replacement
Airbus A319-100	35	2005	2025	Airbus A320neo family
McDonnell Douglas DC-9-20	3	1995	1997	None
McDonnell Douglas DC-9-30	13	1992	2003	McDonnell Douglas MD-80
McDonnell Douglas DC-9-40	2	1996	2003	McDonnell Douglas MD-80
McDonnell Douglas MD-81	6	1999	2005	Airbus A320 family
McDonnell Douglas MD-82	15	1997	2007	Airbus A320 family
McDonnell Douglas MD-83	15	1998	2010	Airbus A320 family
McDonnell Douglas MD-87	1	1998	2003	Airbus A320 family

== Accidents and incidents ==
- July 17, 2015 – Spirit Airlines Flight 708, an Airbus A319-100 (registered as N519NK), suffered a fume event while on descent into Boston, Massachusetts from Chicago O'Hare. Both pilots were taken to a hospital the next day, with the captain showing symptoms of TOCP poisoning and both crew members experiencing severe illness. While the first officer recovered, the captain died 50 days after the accident.
- November 11, 2024 – Spirit Airlines Flight 951, an Airbus A320neo (registered as N966NK), was hit by multiple bullets on final approach into Port-au-Prince, Haiti after a flight from Fort Lauderdale, Florida. A flight attendant was grazed by a bullet and the flight diverted to Santiago de los Caballeros, Dominican Republic.

== See also ==
- Aviation in the United States
- List of defunct airlines of the United States
