= Aviation in the United States =

Overview of US air transportation network

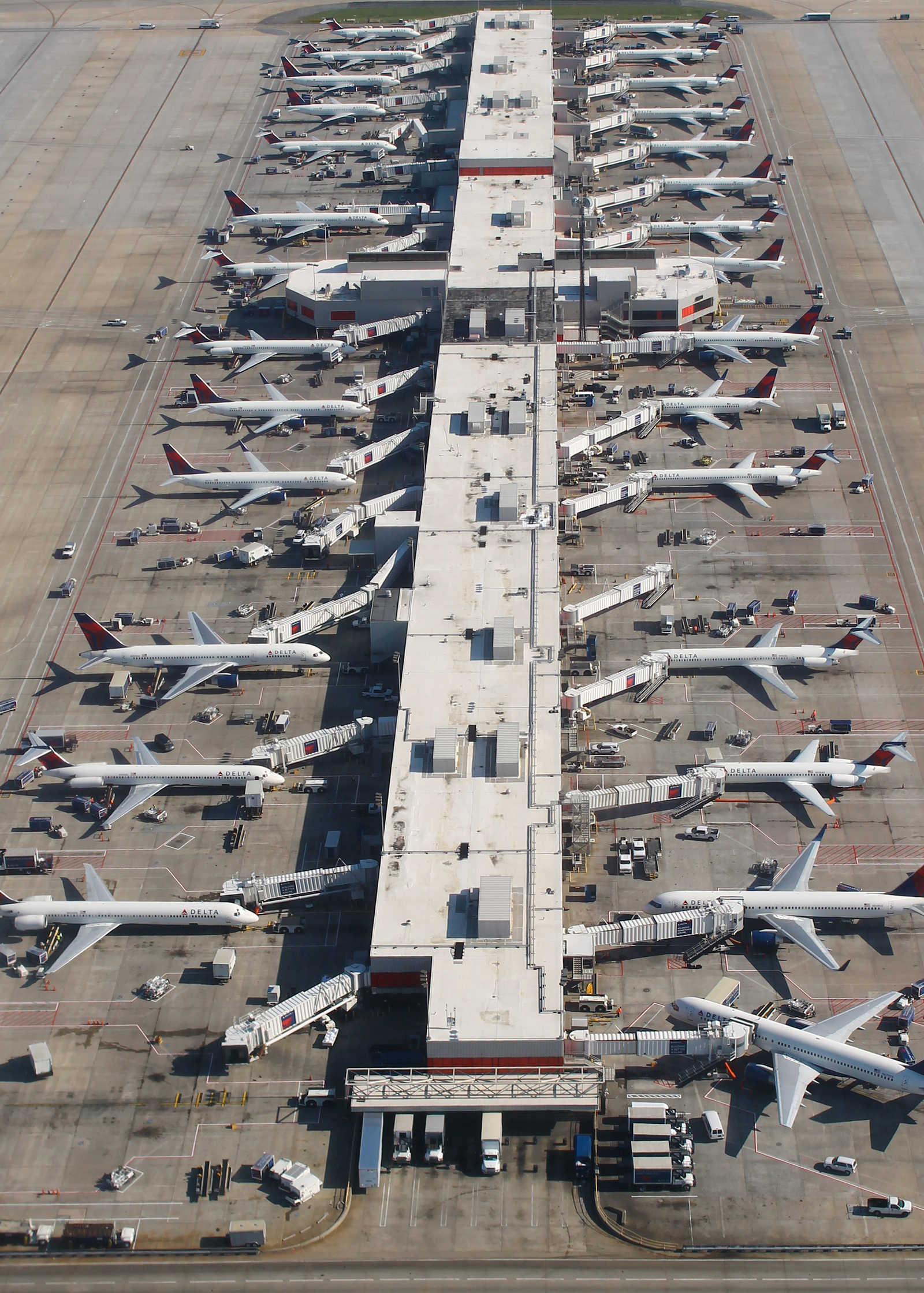
Delta airplanes at Hartsfield–Jackson Atlanta International Airport

The United States has an extensive air transportation network. In 2013, there were 86 airports in the United States that annually handled over 1,000,000 passengers each. The civil airline industry is entirely privately owned and has been largely deregulated since 1978, while most major airports are publicly owned. The three largest airlines in the world by passengers carried are American-based; American Airlines is number one after its 2013 acquisition by US Airways. Of the world's 50 busiest passenger airports, 16 are in the United States, including the top five and the busiest, Hartsfield–Jackson Atlanta International Airport. In terms of cargo, in 2015, eight of the world's thirty busiest airports were in the United States, including the world's second-busiest, Memphis International Airport, just behind Hong Kong International Airport in Hong Kong. Private aircraft are also used for medical emergencies, government agencies, large businesses, and individuals.

As of 2020, there are 19,919 airports in the United States, of which 5,217 are designated as "public use", including for general aviation and other activities. In 2012, 88% of all traffic was through the 62 busiest airports in the country.

Due to the geography of the United States and the generally large distances between major cities, air transportation is the preferred method of travel for trips over 300 miles (480 km), such as for business travelers and long-distance vacation travelers. For cities closer together in the Northeastern part of the country (e.g., Boston, New York City, Philadelphia, Baltimore, and Washington, D.C.), the Northeast Corridor rail line carries the majority of intercity traffic.

From the start of the Great Recession to the early 2010s, air traffic in the U.S. declined and the U.S. government reported 1.2 million fewer scheduled domestic flights in 2013 than in 2007. Air traffic volume also dropped sharply during the COVID-19 pandemic. At the same time, the airline industry has also experienced rapid consolidation, with all of the nation's largest carriers experiencing mergers. The average domestic airline fare steadily increased from 2009 until the first quarter of 2017 where it retreated to the same average of 2009, the lowest the average fare has been since 1995.

== History ==
On January 1, 1914, pioneering aviator Tony Jannus captained the inaugural flight of the St. Petersburg-Tampa Airboat Line, the first commercial passenger airline in the United States.

=== Construction of Air Fields ===
The design of the air fields used by the US Army Signal Corps, which was the precursor to the US Air Force, was created by Albert Kahn. He was an architect who worked on the architecture of many major American cities namely Detroit. Kahn was known for his neo classical architecture which can be seen in the housing on air bases. The army used the Royal Canadian Flying Corps air base structure to build the air fields while Kahn came up with the standard hangar/building designs for the military.

=== World War I ===
When the U.S. entered the World War I in April 1917, it had already been lagging behind its European counterparts in aircraft production. This was largely due to the fact that the U.S. entered the war much later, when most of the European countries were already pressured to advance their aircraft technologies to outcompete one another. The Europeans had already developed standardized mass production of aircraft, while the U.S. was forced to expand to meet their wartime necessities. Even so, most of the aircraft used by the U.S. in wartime were from Britain or France. In August 1917, Congress passed the Aero Bill which dedicated $640 million towards aircraft production; however, the U.S. economy overall was unable to successfully transition into a mass-producing aircraft industry in such a short amount of time.

=== Post WWI Era (1918–1930s) ===
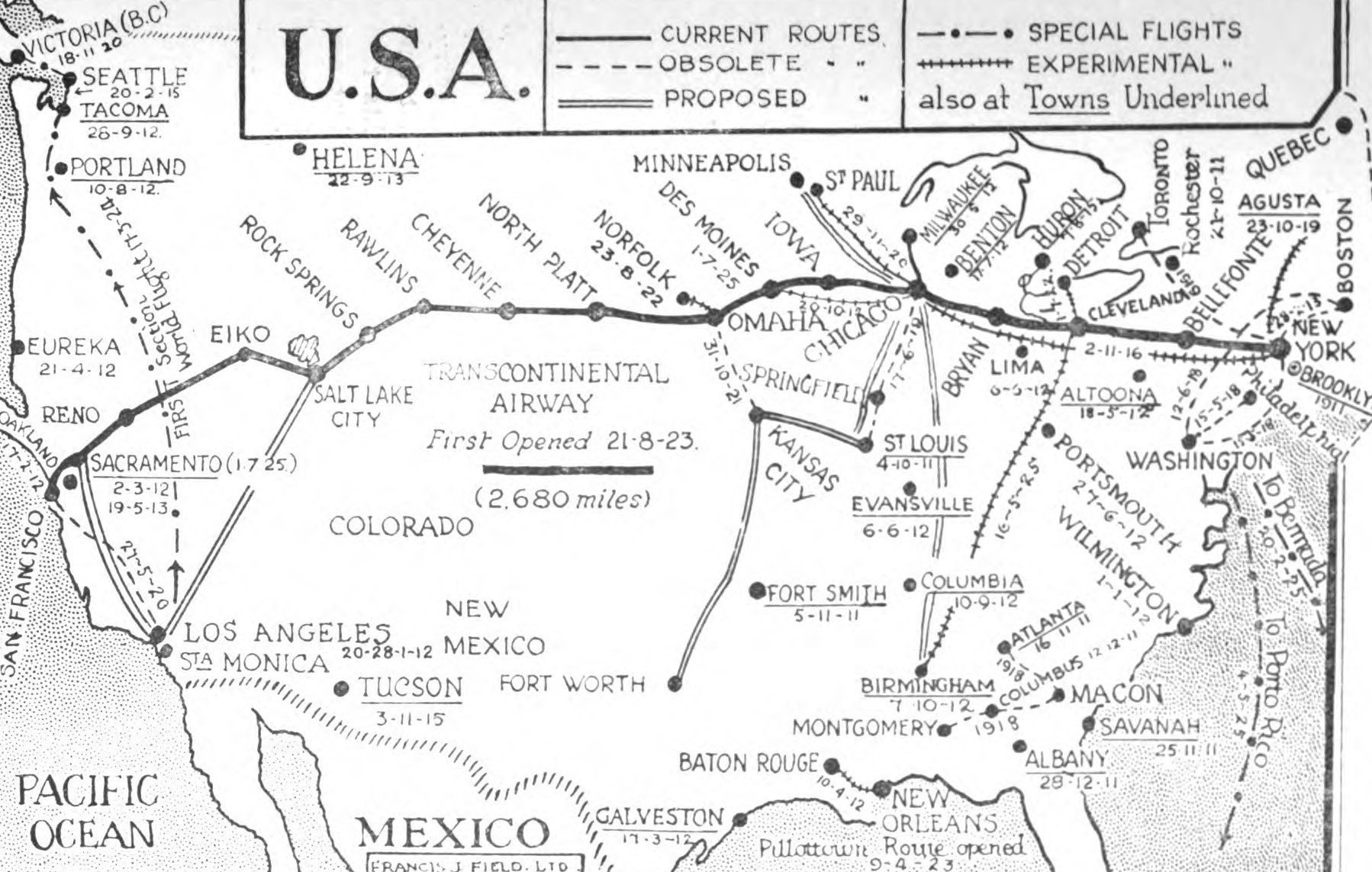
Air routes in the United States in 1925

After the First World War, the U.S. aircraft industry declined and stagnated, due to low budgets, low demand, and the high competition from foreign manufacturers who already possessed technology far more advanced than the U.S. did. Because the bulk of the aircraft demand had come from military uses, the post-war period resulted in a surplus of aircraft left over from wartime accompanied by a lack of demand, creating an excess supply of unused aircraft.

Military aviation dominated the aircraft industry up until the mid-1920s, and it was during the late 1920s when civil aviation appeared and began to rise. Beginning in the mid-1920s, in order to sustain the existence of the aircraft industry the U.S. government endorsed and subsidized airlines to carry airmail throughout the country, leading to the U.S. having the largest airmail system in the world. The U.S. implemented the Kelly Air Mail Act in 1925 which induced competition amongst airlines and eventually led to the expansion from carrying mail to carrying people and commercial goods. The emergence of an expansive airmail system allowed for easier and faster correspondence and transport. Aircraft as a means of passenger travel also began to emerge during this time period, though civilian air travel did not surge until after World War II. Unemployment was not significantly affected by the emergence of the civil aviation industry, as the jobs that were created were occupied by people who previously worked in the army and had been unemployed immediately after the war's end.

=== World War II ===
U.S. aircraft production surged throughout World War II. The U.S. experienced an immense amount of government spending on defense production and a shift from automobile production to aircraft production. At the beginning of the war, the U.S.' aircraft production was one of the lowest in the world, but by 1945, the U.S. aircraft production had produced more than a third of the world's total aircraft. Aircraft production made up most of the U.S.' manufacturing output during the World War II era from 1940 to 1945, contributing to the surge in GDP growth.

The expansion of the airline industry in response to wartime needs also led to higher demand for labor. Increasingly more pilots, flight staff, engineers, and researchers were needed to operate the aircraft as well as develop advanced technology, leading to increased job creation. During this time, unemployment rates decreased significantly, dropping to nearly the full employment rate.

=== Post WWII ===
The end of World War II, immediately followed by demobilization, led to airplane companies losing a total of $35 million in 1946 in sales and $115 million in 1947. There was once again an excess in aircraft supply post-war and not a high enough corresponding demand. Accordingly, unemployment increased slightly by 2% in the 2 years following the end of World War II. However, with the technological improvements in passenger travel safety and comfort, accompanied by an increasing demand in commercial aviation, the airline industry was soon driving revenues that were 500% of its revenues by 1945. This increase in commercial demand was also fueled by an increase in consumer confidence in airlines, reinforced by the creation of the Federal Aviation Administration in 1958, which managed aviation safety.

Economist Alfred Kahn became the chairman of the Civil Aeronautics Board in the mid-1970s, which eventually led to Congress passing the Airline Deregulation Act of 1978. This allowed for free market competition in the airline industry, to meet the pressure of the decreasing world price of air travel. This ultimately allowed the U.S. airline industry to operate competitively in the international market.

=== Twenty-first century ===
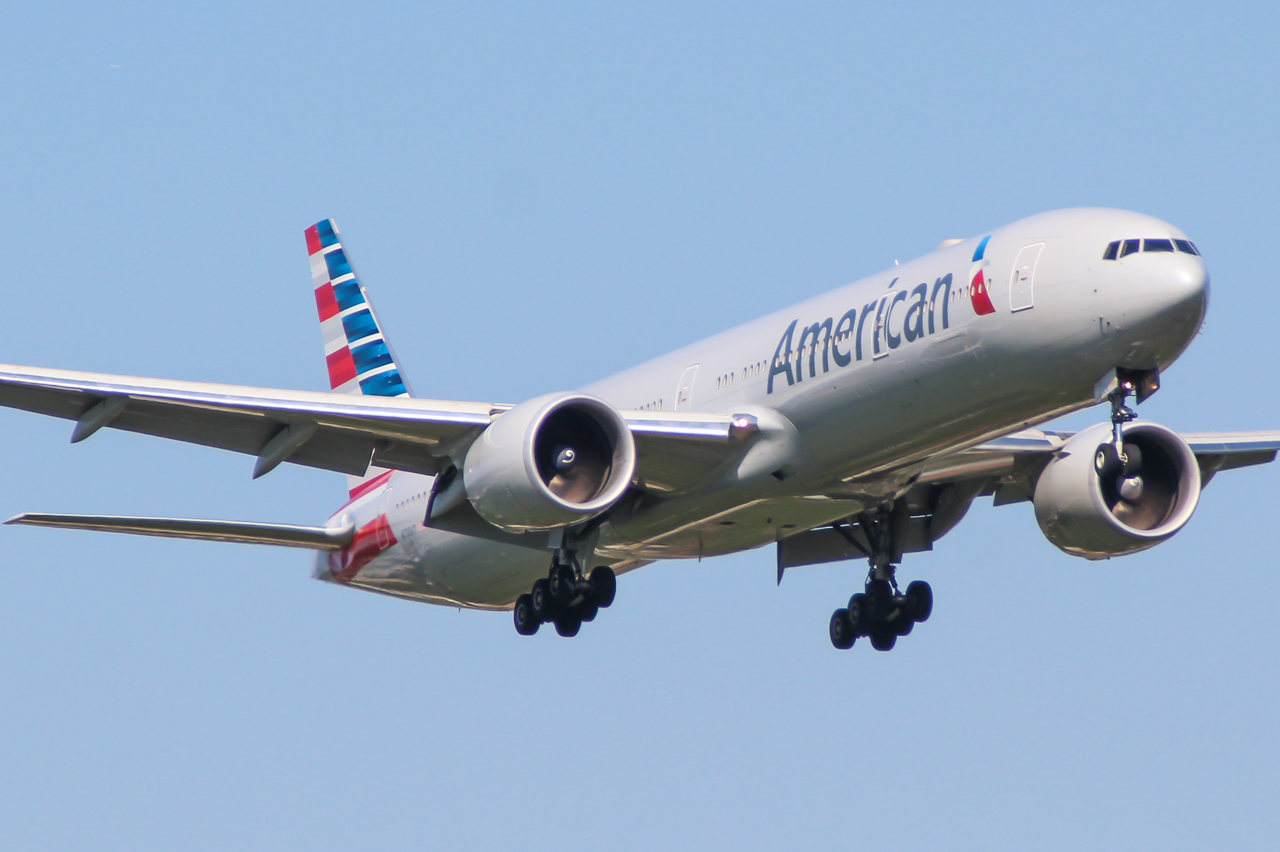
An aircraft from the United States landing at London's Heathrow Airport. Air travel is the most popular means of long-distance passenger travel in the U.S.

The U.S. airline industry has suffered significantly as a result of the terrorist attacks of September 11, 2001. The attacks of September 11 dramatically decreased consumer confidence in the airline industry. The airline industry lost more than $330 million each day within the first week of the attacks, totaling losses between $1 and $2 billion. In the following years, the decrease in demand accompanied by the decreasing price of air travel reduced revenues significantly.

The price of fuel has also been rising, further increasing airlines' losses by $180 million per year. Another large part of airline expenses comes from employee wages, which make up 40% of airlines' expenses. To compensate for rising costs and decreasing revenues, airlines have decreased the number of planes in service and thus have also laid off workers, negatively impacting the economy's unemployment rate.

Annual U.S. Schedule Service Passenger Airlines Financial Reports, $ millions
Year	Operating Revenue	Fares	Baggage Fees	Change Fees	Operating Expenses	Fuel	Labor	Operating Profit	Net Income
2011	153,294	114,299	3,393	2,390	148,048	43,755	35,377	5,246	490
2012	156,470	115,975	3,450	2,538	150,467	44,902	37,195	6,003	98
2013	161,597	121,333	3,350	2,814	150,286	42,629	38,043	11,311	12,169
2014	169,277	127,455	3,530	2,981	154,677	43,431	40,771	14,600	7,447
2015	168,874	126,880	3,814	3,012	140,881	26,977	45,385	27,993	25,596

Large Airline Systemwide (Domestic + International), $ millions, 2015
Rank	Airline	Net Income	Operating Profit	Operating Revenue	Fares	%	Operating Expenses	Fuel	%	Labor	%
1	American	7,895	6,189	41,084	29,173	0.71	34,895	6,189	17.7	10,066	28.8
2	Delta	4,539	7,845	40,816	28,437	0.70	32,971	6,503	19.7	10,445	31.7
3	United	7,301	5,167	37,864	26,333	0.70	32,697	6,345	19.4	10,014	30.6
4	Southwest	2,181	4,117	19,820	18,347	0.93	15,704	3,616	23.0	6,689	42.6
5	JetBlue	677	1,198	6,416	5,907	0.92	5,218	1,348	25.8	1,628	31.2
6	Alaska	829	1,291	5,594	3,961	0.71	4,303	808	18.8	1,233	28.6
7	Hawaiian	193	431	2,313	2,015	0.87	1,882	416	22.1	526	27.9
8	Spirit	331	509	2,142	1,267	0.59	1,632	461	28.3	378	23.2
9	SkyWest	113	216	1,932	1,876	0.97	1,716	115	6.7	732	42.6
10	Frontier	146	276	1,604	1,277	0.80	1,328	346	26.1	313	23.6
	10-Carrier	24,204	27,239	159,585	118,592	0.74	132,346	26,148	19.8	42,023	31.8
	All	25,596	27,993	168,874	126,880	0.75	140,881	26,977	19.1	45,385	32.2

=== Contribution to GDP and employment ===
The Federal Aviation Administration (FAA) in 2009 found that commercial aviation accounts for approximately 5% of U.S. gross domestic product and also contributes to $1.3 trillion in annual economic activity as well as helps generate and support 10 million jobs annually. The aircraft industry contributes to the economy through many different avenues, including manufacturing and the airline industry. As of 2009, the National Air Traffic Controllers Association reported airline operations helped "generate $150.5 billion to the U.S. gross domestic product, while airport operations contributed an additional $44.6 billion."

Economic Impact of Commercial Aviation on the U.S. Economy (2006–2009)

Annual Economic Activity/Output	$1.2–$2.3 trillion
Annual Personal Earnings	$370–$405 billion
Share of GDP	4.9–5.2 percent
Job Impact	9.7–10.5 million

=== Contribution to Climate Change ===
The environmental effects of aviation in the US are considerable. Domestic flights in the US caused about 385 kg of CO_{2} per capita to be emitted in 2018, the highest value of any country, while outbound international flights contributed another 170 kg per capita.

== Airports ==
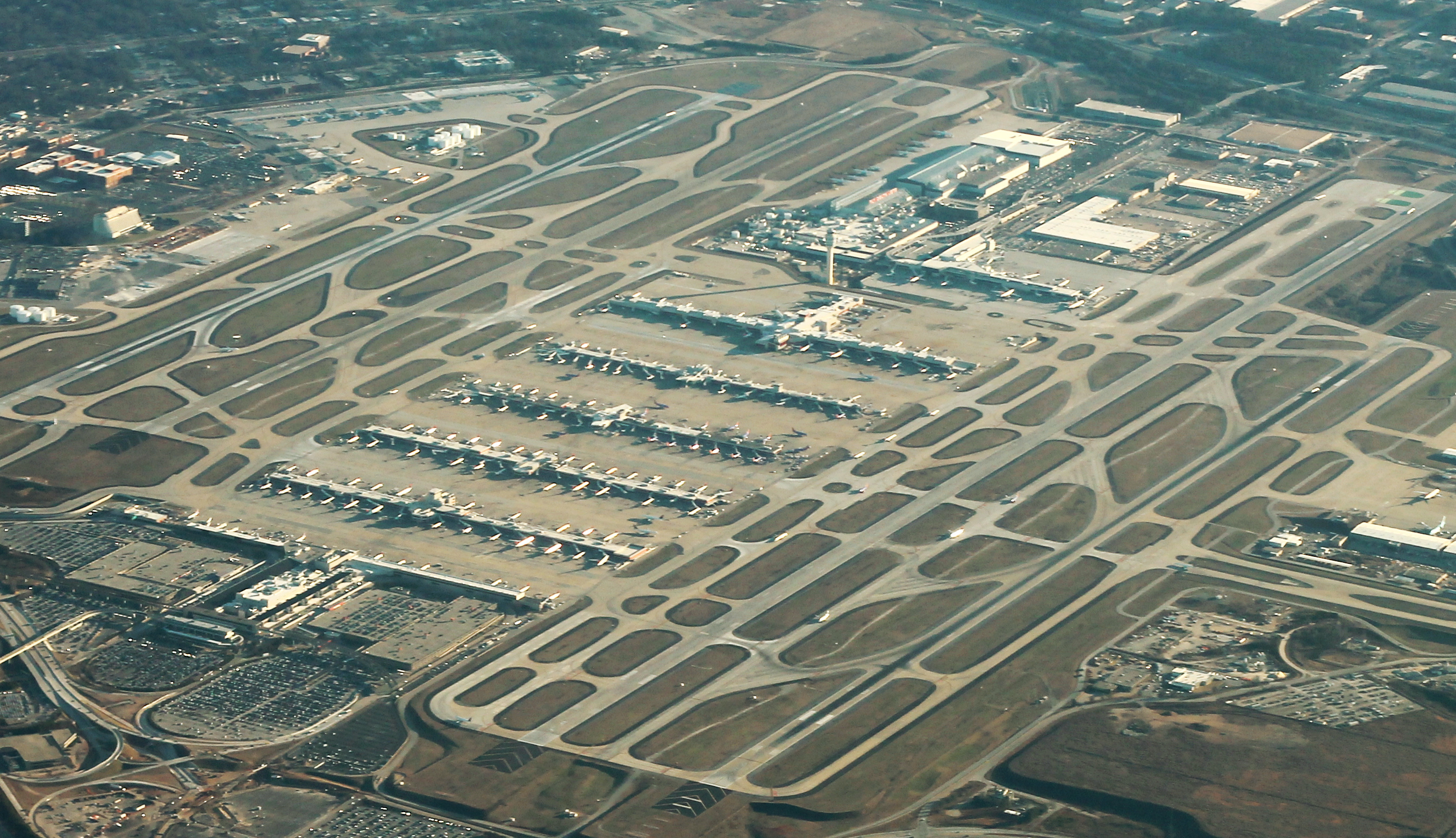
Hartsfield–Jackson Atlanta International Airport is the world's busiest by passenger traffic.

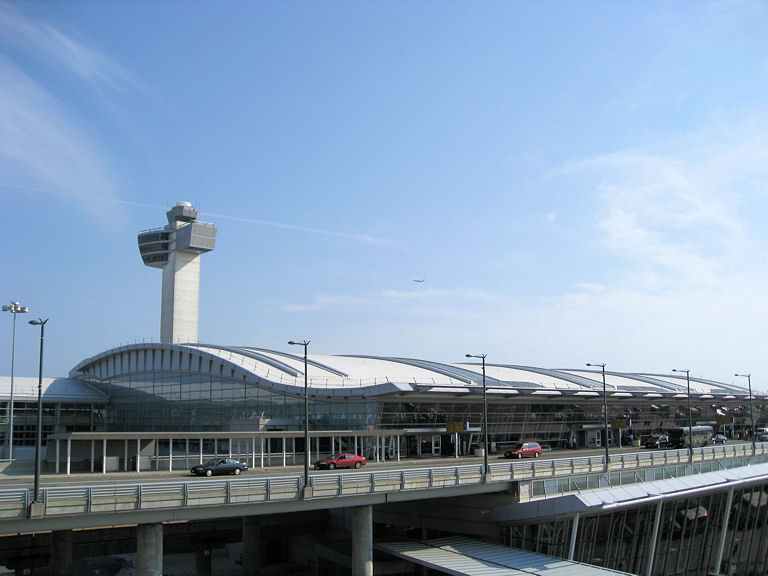
Terminal 4 of John F. Kennedy International Airport, the busiest international air passenger gateway to the United States

=== Operations ===
Public airports are usually constructed and operated by local governments. The main exceptions are on military bases. Like highways and passenger rail, the federal government subsidizes air travel with $14 billion of federal funds going to airport operations in 2002.

=== Security and regulation ===
Air transportation security in the United States is regulated by the Transportation Security Administration (TSA), an agency of the US Department of Homeland Security. Passengers must provide a valid federal or state-issued ID in order to be allowed onto a flight. A person must also go through a pat-down procedure or a body scan before boarding a flight to ensure that they have no prohibited items. These security policies have been adopted by the US government ever since the 9/11 Terrorist Attacks in which terrorists managed to hijack several commercial airliners. Items that are prohibited on airplanes include firearms, tools, or other objects that can be used as weapons, explosive or flammable materials, and other dangerous or debilitating chemicals or substances.

== Airlines ==
=== Passenger airlines ===
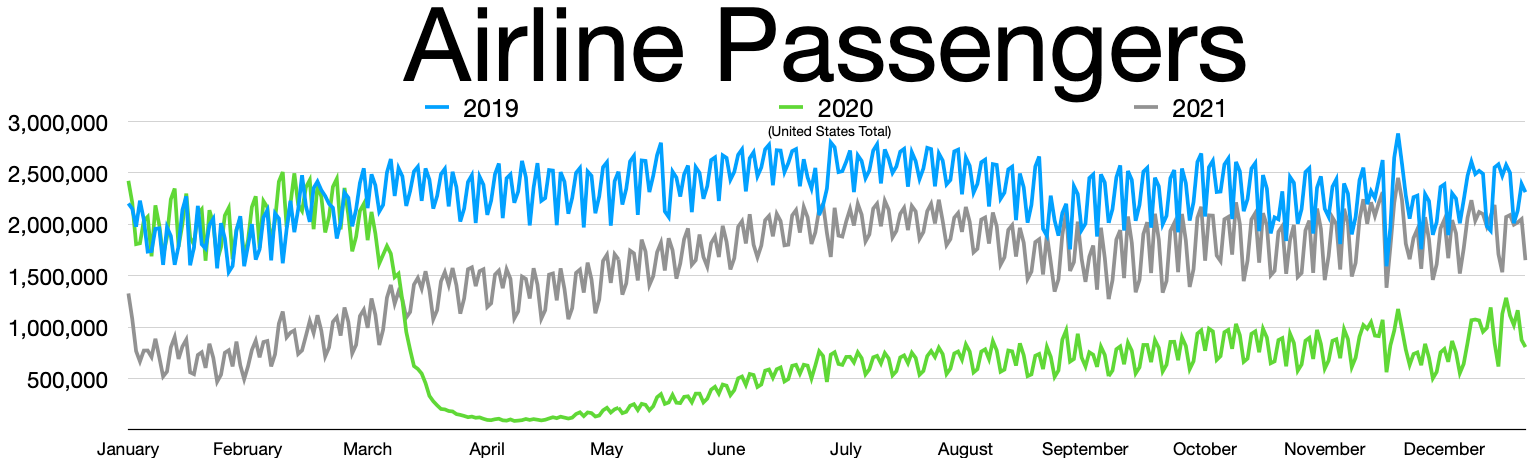
Daily TSA checkpoint travel passengers 2019–2021

Top 500 busiest airports by passenger enplanements

The U.S. has no single flag carrier and passenger airlines in the United States have always been privately owned. The U.S. has three major international carriers (Delta Air Lines, American Airlines, and United Airlines) and seven additional large carriers that operate mainly domestic flights but have some international destinations (Alaska Airlines, Allegiant Air, Frontier Airlines, Hawaiian Airlines, JetBlue, Southwest Airlines, and Sun Country Airlines). At the end of 2014, the three international carriers plus Southwest controlled more than 80% of all passenger travel in the U.S. market.

There is currently no government regulation of ticket pricing, although the federal government retains jurisdiction over aircraft safety, pilot training, and accident investigations (through the Federal Aviation Administration and the National Transportation Safety Board). The Transportation Security Administration provides security at airports and the federal government provides billions of dollars annually to maintain air transport facilities and manage the country's air traffic control system.

Many airlines operate on a "hub and spoke" model. This system gives the predominant airline in a given airport a strong competitive position as it feeds passengers to and from the hub, maximizing the number of passengers on each flight. Examples of airline hubs include United Airlines at Houston, Newark, Chicago-O'Hare, Denver, Los Angeles, San Francisco, and Washington-Dulles; Delta Air Lines at Atlanta, Boston, New York-JFK, New York-LaGuardia, Salt Lake City, Detroit, Los Angeles, Minneapolis, and Seattle; and American Airlines at Charlotte, Chicago-O'Hare, Dallas/Fort Worth, Los Angeles, Miami, New York-JFK, New York-LaGuardia, Philadelphia, Phoenix, and Washington-Reagan.

=== Air cargo ===
Cargo airports in the United States by weight landed

Air cargo comprises a large number of daily flights in the United States and are operated by private parcel companies such as FedEx and United Parcel Service. Both organizations operate some of the largest fleets in the world, using the hub-and-spoke model with their hub near the population center of the US, UPS operating out of Louisville and FedEx out of Memphis. Most air cargo moved by these organizations is time-sensitive overnight and 2nd-day parcels. The U.S. Postal Service also moves much of its letters and time-sensitive parcels via air, but on regularly scheduled passenger flights. At one time the U.S. Mail charged a premium for letters sent by airmail, but no longer does so except for overnight express mail.

Other large American cargo airlines include Atlas Air, Polar Air Cargo, Kalitta Air and National.

== Delays ==
Ranking of Major Airports by Lowest On-Time Arrival Performance (2007)
Airport	% on time
New York- LaGuardia	58.48
Newark	59.45
New York- JFK	62.84
Chicago- O'Hare	65.88
Philadelphia	66.54
Boston	69.68
San Francisco	69.75
Miami	70.99
Charlotte Douglas	71.30
Seattle-Tacoma	71.43
Largest 32 airports average	73.03

Airline delays have been the subject of some controversy, prompting a GAO audit and Congressional debate in 2007–08.

Roughly one in four passengers experienced a passenger trip delay in 2007 and the average duration of delay experienced by these passengers was 1 hour 54 minutes. 24% of flights were delayed and 2% were cancelled entirely. Overall, passengers were delayed 320 million hours in 2007 with an estimated deadweight economic loss of up to $41 billion.

An average of 40% of passenger aircraft delays in the U.S. originated in the New York metropolitan area, some in the area and others due to cascading effects. One-third of aircraft in the national airspace system move through the New York area at some point during a typical day.

In the two years prior to the pandemic, the GAO reported that weather was the primary reason for cancellations, but the percentage of cancellations caused by airlines, such as maintenance problems or staff shortages, began to rise in early 2021. From October to December 2021, the airline caused 60 percent or more of cancellations—higher than any time in 2018 or 2019.

To deal with delays, takeoff and landing scheduling caps have been imposed on certain urban airports at various times since 1968, including Washington Reagan National, Chicago O'Hare, and the three New York airports. Other short-term measures have been taken, including minor procedural changes, use of military airspace on peak travel days, and appointment of a "New York Airspace Czar" (Director for the New York Area Program Integration Office). The New York/New Jersey/Philadelphia airspace is being "redesigned" incrementally, with completion estimated in 2012. The Bush Administration announced plans to auction some takeoff and landing slots at the New York airports, but plans were canceled by the Obama administration.

Longer-term solutions include increasing capacity by building more runways, and implementing the Next Generation Air Transportation System which would allow more direct flight paths. The California High-Speed Rail project has been justified among other things as a way to decrease congestion and thereby delays on the busy San Francisco Bay Area–Metro Los Angeles air corridor.

== Network statistics ==
- Airports: 14,951 (2008 est.)

- Airports with paved runways:
  - Total: 5,146
  - Over 10,000 ft: (3,048 m): 190
  - 8,000 ft (2,438 m) to 10,000 ft (3,048 m): 227
  - 5,000 ft (1,524 m) to 8,000 ft (2,438 m): 1,464
  - 3,000 ft (914 m) to 5,000 ft (1,524 m): 2,307
  - Under 3,000 ft (914 m): 958 (1999 est.)
- Airports with unpaved runways:
  - Total: 9,805
  - 8,000 ft (2,438 m) to 10,000 ft (3,048 m): 6
  - 5,000 ft (1,524 m) to 8,000 ft (2,438 m): 156
  - 3,000 ft (914 m) to 5,000 ft (1,524 m): 1,734
  - Under 3,000 ft (914 m): 7,909 (1999 est.)

- Heliports: 146 (CIA, 2007 est.)

== See also ==
- Federal Aviation Administration – The national aviation authority of the United States
- National Airspace System – Air traffic control
- Next Generation Air Transportation System
- Space-A travel – A system for military-related people to travel free on military flights
