= Alaska Air Group =

U.S. airline holding company

Alaska Air Group, Inc.
- Type: Public
- Traded as: NYSE: ALK; DJTA component; S&P 400 component
- Industry: Transportation
- Founded: 1985; 41 years ago
- Headquarters: SeaTac, Washington, United States
- Area served: United States
- Key people: Ben Minicucci (group CEO); Patricia Bedient (chair); Jason Berry (Alaska Airlines COO); Diana Birkett Rakow (Hawaiian Airlines CEO); Andy Schneider (Horizon Air CEO and president)
- Revenue: ▲US$14.2 billion (2025)
- Operating income: ▲US$570 million (2024)
- Net income: ▼US$100 million (2025)
- Total assets: ▲US$20.4 billion (2025)
- Total equity: ▼US$4.1 billion (2025)
- Number of employees: ▲31,585 (2025)
- Subsidiaries: Alaska Airlines; Hawaiian Airlines; Horizon Air; McGee Air Services
- Website: investor.alaskaair.com
- Footnotes; Financials as of December 31, 2025. References

Alaska Air Group, Inc. is an American airline holding company based in SeaTac, Washington, United States. The group owns two mainline carriers, Alaska Airlines and Hawaiian Airlines, along with a regional airline, Horizon Air. Alaska Airlines in turn wholly owns an aircraft ground handling company, McGee Air Services.

== History ==
Alaska Air Group was formed in 1985 as a holding company for Alaska Airlines, and a year later it acquired Horizon Air and Jet America Airlines. Jet America Airlines was merged into Alaska Airlines in 1987.

In 2011, Alaska Air Group replaced the AMR Corporation in the Dow Jones Transportation Average following AMR's filing for bankruptcy.

On March 29, 2016, Alaska Airlines announced that it would form a wholly owned subsidiary called McGee Air Services, a dedicated airline services company. McGee competes with other companies to provide ground handling, aircraft cleaning and wheelchair services to Alaska Airlines.

On April 4, 2016, Alaska Air Group announced plans to acquire Virgin America, pending approval from US government regulators and Virgin America shareholders; the acquisition was completed on December 14, 2016. The total price was approximately $2.6 billion. Until 2018, Alaska Air Group continued to operate Alaska Airlines and Virgin America as separate airlines and continued to honor both Alaska's Mileage Plan and Virgin America's Elevate loyalty programs. Following the acquisition of Virgin America, the actual number of Alaska Air Group employees had increased from 15,143 at the end of 2015 to 19,112 (12,224 at Alaska Airlines, 3,616 at Horizon Air, and 3,252 at Virgin America) by the end of 2016.

On March 22, 2017, the company announced that Alaska Air Group would merge Virgin America and Alaska Airlines, with the combined airline to operate under the Alaska Airlines brand. The merger was largely completed on April 25, 2018 and the Virgin America brand was fully retired by June 2, 2019.

On December 3, 2023, Alaska Air Group announced that it planned to purchase Hawaiian Airlines in a deal worth approximately $1.9 billion. The deal would retain both Alaska Airlines and Hawaiian Airlines as separate brands. On August 19, 2024, the U.S. Department of Justice completed its regulatory antitrust review of the proposed acquisition and declined to file a lawsuit to block it. The merger received the approval of the U.S. Department of Transportation on September 17, 2024 with the merger closing the following day.

== Corporate affairs ==
=== Business trends ===
The key trends for Alaska Air Group are shown below (as at year ending December 31):

| Year | Revenue (in million US$) | Net income (in million US$) | Employees (FTE) | Passengers (in millions) | Load factor (%) | Aircraft | Notes/ references |
|---|---|---|---|---|---|---|---|
| 2009 | 3,400 | 122 | 12,223 | 15.5 | 79.3 | 115 | |
| 2010 | 3,832 | 251 | 11,696 | 23.3 | 82.4 | 114 | |
| 2011 | 4,318 | 245 | 11,840 | 24.8 | 84.5 | 117 | |
| 2012 | 4,657 | 316 | 11,955 | 25.9 | 85.9 | 124 | |
| 2013 | 5,156 | 508 | 12,163 | 27.4 | 85.6 | 190 | |
| 2014 | 5,368 | 605 | 12,739 | 29.3 | 85.1 | 196 | |
| 2015 | 5,598 | 848 | 13,858 | 31.9 | 84.1 | 212 | |
| 2016 | 5,931 | 814 | 14,760 | 41.9 | 84.1 | 285 | |
| 2017 | 7,933 | 1,028 | 23,156 | 44.0 | 84.3 | 304 | |
| 2018 | 8,264 | 437 | 21,641 | 45.8 | 83.7 | 330 | |
| 2019 | 8,781 | 769 | 22,126 | 46.7 | 84.1 | 332 | |
| 2020 | 3,566 | −1,324 | 17,596 | 17.9 | 55.2 | 291 | (Note: Activities and income in 2020 were severely reduced by the impact of the coronavirus pandemic) |
| 2021 | 6,176 | 478 | 19,375 | 32.4 | 73.6 | 311 | |
| 2022 | 9,646 | 58 | 22,564 | 41.5 | 84.5 | 311 | |
| 2023 | 10,426 | 235 | 26,043 | 44.6 | 83.7 | 314 | |
| 2024 | 11,735 | 395 | 25,751 | 49.2 | 83.9 | 392 | |
| 2025 | 14,239 | 100 | 31,585 | 58.6 | 82.9 | 413 | |

=== Headquarters ===
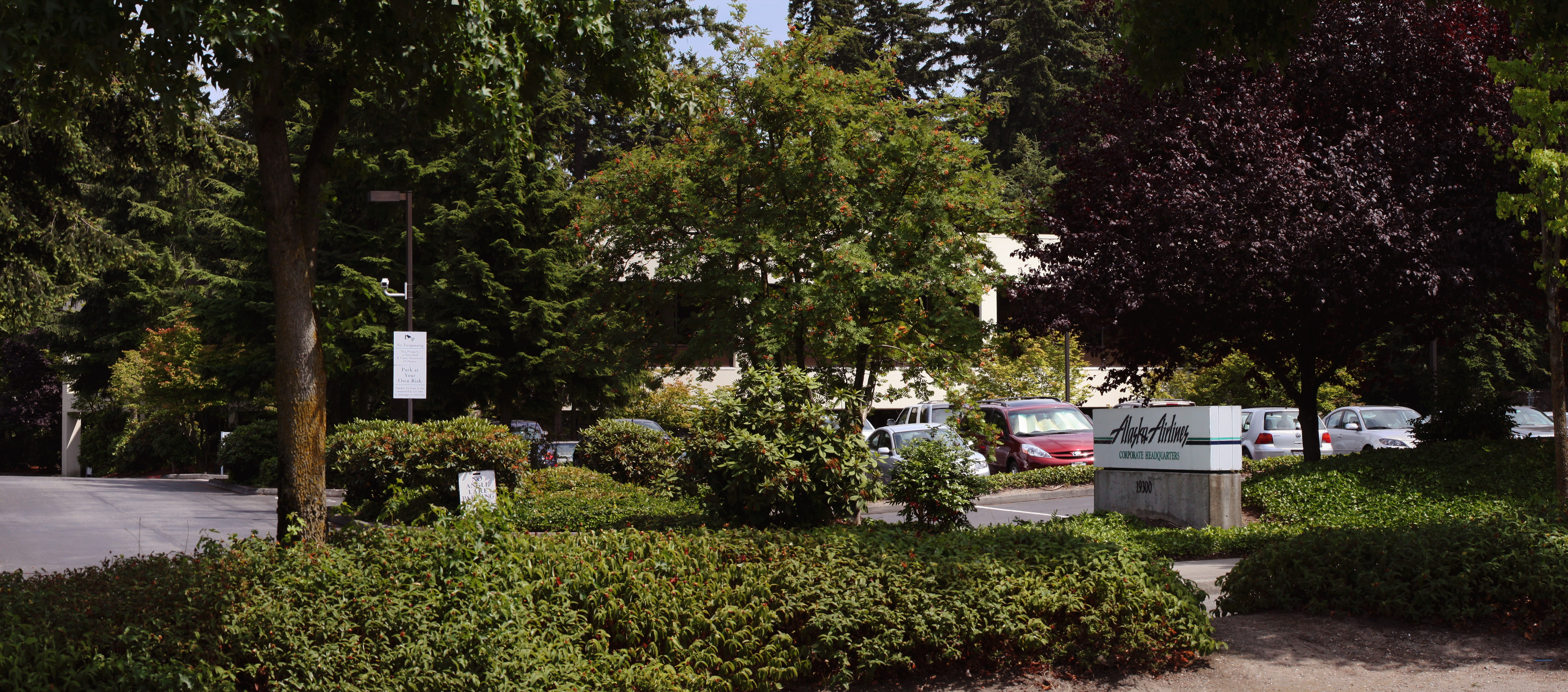
Alaska Air Group headquarters in SeaTac, Washington

The Alaska Air Group headquarters is located at 19300 International Boulevard, SeaTac, Washington, United States.

On May 3, 2018, Alaska Airlines unveiled plans to construct a 128,000-square-foot building near Sea-Tac Airport to provide office space for its growing workforce. The new building will be across the street from Alaska's Corporate Headquarters and adjacent to its Flight Training Center. Construction was expected to be completed by early 2020.

== Operations ==
=== Fleet ===
Alaska Air Group operates a mix of Airbus, Boeing and Embraer aircraft through its subsidiaries Alaska Airlines, Hawaiian Airlines, and Horizon Air.

As of March 2026, Alaska Airlines' fleet consists of about 235 Boeing 737 and 5 Boeing 787 aircraft, Hawaiian Airlines' fleet consists of about 18 Airbus A321neo, 24 Airbus A330, and 19 Boeing 717 aircraft, and Horizon Air's fleet consists of about 44 Embraer 175 aircraft, with the combined fleet under Alaska Air Group's management numbering 345 aircraft.

Alaska Air Group has created a new branding identity for its Horizon Air subsidiary and other independently owned and separately directed affiliate regional airlines it chooses to contract to do regional flying business into markets too limited to be flown only on Alaska Airlines mainline equipment. Among the other airlines now sub-contracted to do additional flying for the Alaska Air Group is SkyWest Airlines, who has about 40 Embraer 175 aircraft dedicated to providing service for the Alaska Airlines are painted in a very similar manner to Horizon's. SkyWest's fleet however, is branded Alaska SkyWest to differentiate that airline's aircraft from those of Horizon Air.

=== Route network ===
Through Alaska Airlines and Horizon Air, Alaska Air Group services the passenger and cargo markets of the Pacific Northwest with its extensive route network hub through Seattle–Tacoma in Washington state and Portland in Oregon, and the state of Alaska in Anchorage. After the demise of Aloha Airlines and ATA Airlines in 2008, Alaska Air Group expanded heavily centering on Hawaii and other non-airline hub secondary mainland cities and airports, including San Diego and San Jose. After the acquisition of Virgin America in 2016, Alaska Air Group further expanded into California through Virgin America's hubs in San Francisco and Los Angeles. After the acquisition of Hawaiian Airlines in 2024, Alaska Air Group is expanding into Hawaii through Hawaiian Airlines' hub in Honolulu, making it the second largest hub behind Seattle–Tacoma.
