= Alaska Airlines =

Airline in the United States

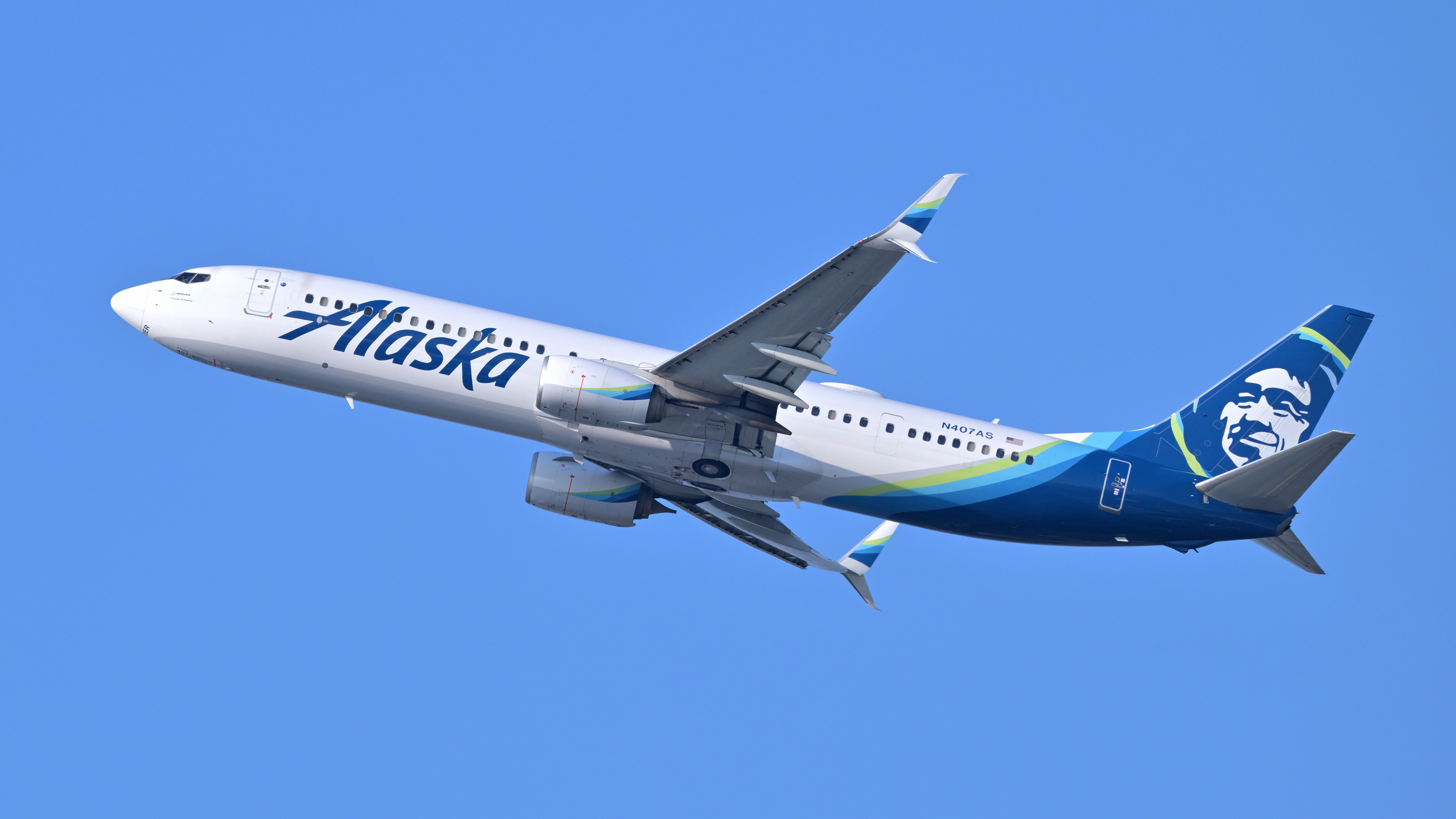
- Alaska Airlines Boeing 737-900ER
IATA	ICAO	Call sign
AS	ASA	ALASKA
- Founded: April 14, 1932; 94 years ago (as McGee Airways)
- Commenced operations: June 6, 1944; 82 years ago
- AOC #: ASAA802A
- Hubs: Anchorage; Los Angeles; Portland (OR); San Diego; San Francisco; Seattle/Tacoma
- Focus cities: Boise (ID)
- Frequent-flyer program: Atmos Rewards
- Alliance: Oneworld
- Fleet size: 351
- Destinations: 128
- Parent company: Alaska Air Group
- Headquarters: SeaTac, Washington, United States
- Key people: Ben Minicucci (group CEO); Jason Berry (COO)
- Founder: Linious "Mac" McGee
- Revenue: US$9.1 billion (2025)
- Net income: ▼US$526 million (2025)
- Total assets: ▲US$25 billion (2025)
- Employees: ▲22,377 (2025)
- Website: www.alaskaair.com

Alaska Airlines is a major airline in the United States headquartered in SeaTac, Washington, within the Seattle metropolitan area. It is the fifth-largest airline in North America when measured by scheduled passengers carried, as of 2024. Alaska, together with its regional partners Horizon Air and SkyWest Airlines, operates a route network primarily focused on connecting cities along the West Coast of the United States (including Alaska and Hawaii) to over 100 destinations in the contiguous United States, North America, Asia, Oceania, and Europe.

The airline operates out of six hubs with its primary hub at Seattle–Tacoma International Airport. Alaska Airlines is a member of Oneworld, the third-largest airline alliance in the world. As of 2020, the airline employs over 16,000 people and has been ranked by J. D. Power as having the highest customer satisfaction of the traditional airlines for twelve consecutive years. In 2024, the airline's parent Alaska Air Group completed an acquisition of Hawaiian Airlines.

== History ==
=== Early years (1932–1945) ===
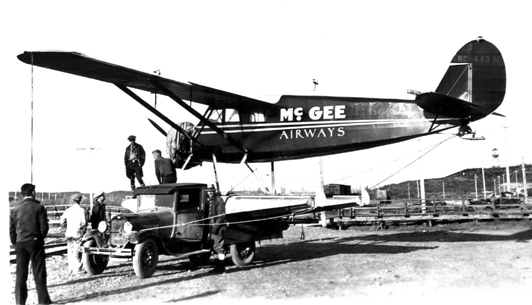
A Stinson "S" Junior aircraft of McGee Airways, the precursor to present-day Alaska Airlines

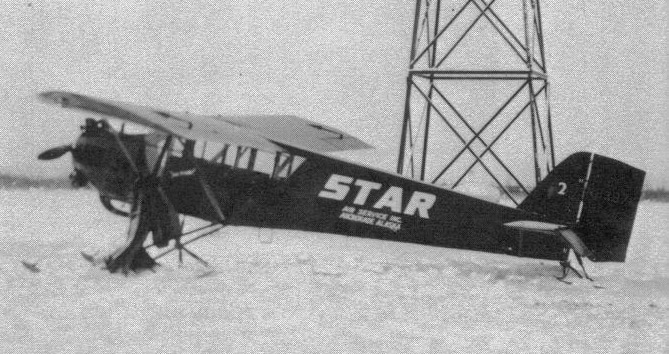
Star Air Service Curtiss Robin A

McGee Airways, a precursor to Alaska Airlines, was established by Linious "Mac" McGee and flew its first service between Anchorage and Bristol Bay. Service was unscheduled, with flights taking off when passengers, a load of cargo, or mail needed passage.

The airline struggled financially during the Great Depression. Too many airlines were in Anchorage at the time, with not enough demand to support them. As a result, the airline underwent multiple mergers. The first of these mergers was in 1934, when McGee sold his namesake airline for US$50,000 (equivalent to $1,203,358 in 2025) to Star Air Service, an airline also located in Anchorage. This allowed McGee to enter the mining industry. With a fleet of 15 aircraft, Star Air Service was a dominant airline in Alaska, but the airline continued to struggle financially because of high maintenance costs for its wood-and-fabric planes.

In 1937, McGee came back to the airline and opened a liquor store, and the airline began flying liquor to remote Alaskan communities. That year, Star Air Service purchased Alaska Interior Airlines and was incorporated as Star Air Lines. Star was again sold later that year to a group of miners.

In 1938, federal regulation began when Congress created the Civil Aeronautics Board (CAB), which awarded the airline most of the routes that it wanted in Alaska, but the coveted route between Seattle and Fairbanks was awarded to Pan American Airways.

In 1941, Star Air Service was purchased by Raymond Marshall, a businessman from New York City. In 1942, the airline purchased three other airlines in Alaska, including Lavery Air Service, Mirow Air Service, and Pollack Flying Service. They also purchased a hangar at the Anchorage airport. In 1942, the airline's name was changed to Alaska Star Airlines.

When the United States entered World War II in December 1941, Alaska Airlines faced a shortage of pilots. During the war, the airline lacked funds and equipment, and pilots were often forced to buy fuel for their planes out of their own pockets. The company, which was frequently subjected to lawsuits, also went through many different presidents during this time. In 1943, Alaska Airlines purchased the Lockheed Model 18 Lodestar, its first multi-engine aircraft. That same year, the company's stock was traded for the first time on the American Stock Exchange.

The name Alaska Airlines was adopted on May 2, 1944, having narrowly beaten a competitor who was applying for the name. In the 1940s, Alaska's headquarters were in Anchorage.

=== Expansion after World War II (1945–1949) ===
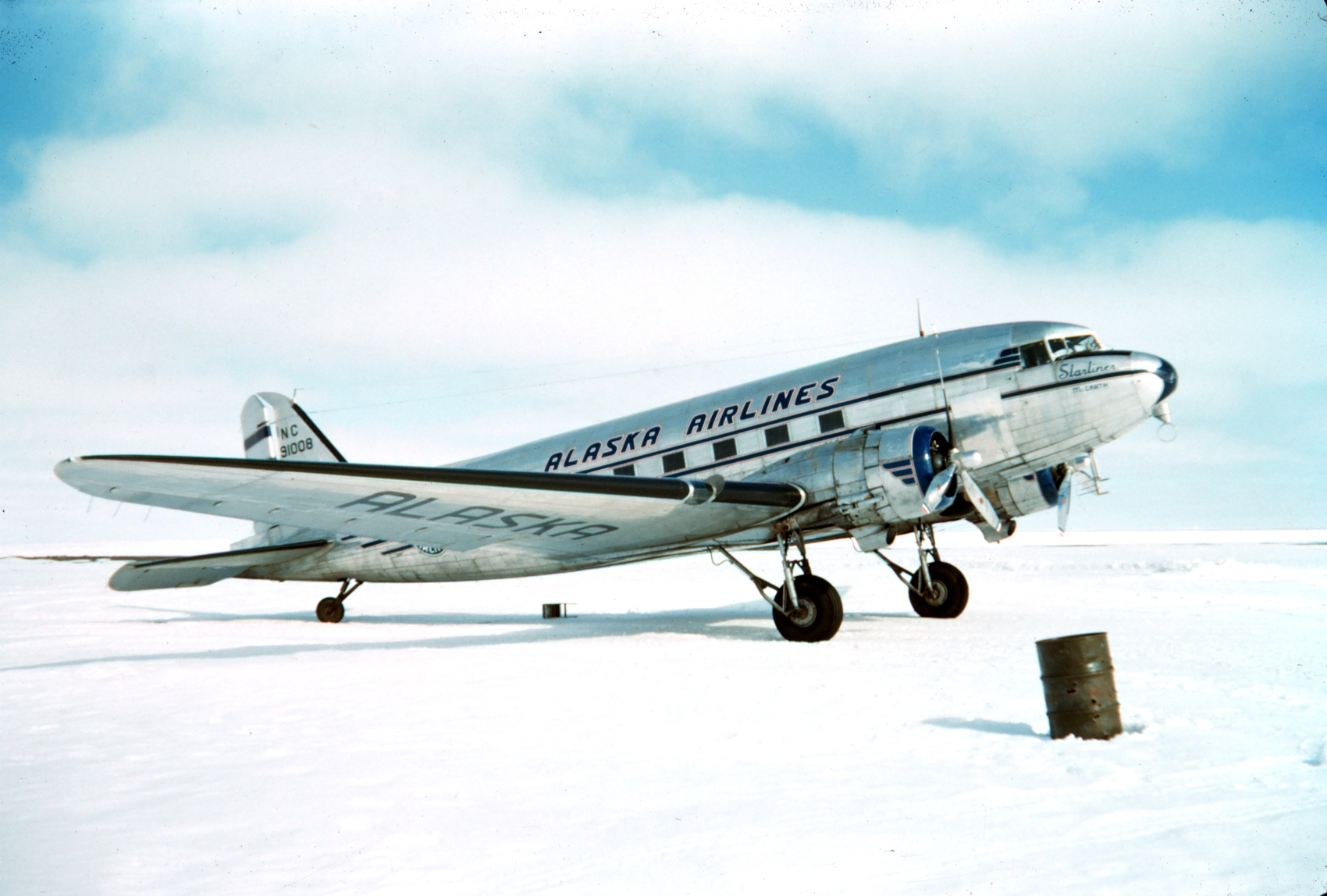
One of the Douglas DC3s purchased after World War II

In 1945, Alaska Airlines hired its first stewardesses. In 1947, James Wooten became president of the airline and began an effort to expand the company. Under his leadership, the airline purchased many surplus military aircraft from the government that had been used during World War II. The airline purchased Douglas DC-3s, Douglas DC-4s, and Curtiss-Wright C-46 Commandos. Alaska Airlines was the first carrier certified to operate DC-3s on skis.

Alaska Airlines' large charter business made it profitable, and the airline moved its base of operations to Paine Field, an airport, in Everett, Washington, north of Seattle. It kept a branch office in Anchorage. Despite its success, Alaska Airlines' worldwide charter business was short-lived. In 1949, the CAB tightened its regulations and placed heavy fines on the airline, shutting down the charter service completely for safety violations, and president James Wooten left the company. Also in 1949, Alaska Air began operating five Bell 47B helicopters to support oil exploration on the North Slope thus becoming the first airline in Alaska to operate rotary-wing aircraft.

In 1949, the airline was a major participant in an effort by the newly established state of Israel to airlift Jews out of Yemen to Israel in what became known as Operation Magic Carpet. C-46 or DC-4 aircraft were used for the nearly 3,000-mile flight, made necessary to avoid overflying Arab nations. Planes flew from Eritrea to Aden, then along the Gulf of Aqaba to Tel Aviv. After unloading the refugees, crews then immediately continued to Cyprus, afraid to stay on the ground in Tel Aviv for fear of being bombed. Some 49,000 Yemenite Jews were airlifted by Alaska Airlines and other carriers without a single loss of life.

=== New leadership (1950s) ===
Alaska Airlines started the 1950s without its worldwide charter business and operations restricted to the state of Alaska. In 1950, it purchased two smaller Alaskan airlines, Collins Air Service and Al Jones Airways.

Though the airline had grown much under the ownership of Raymond Marshall, the CAB forced him out in 1951 due to continuing financial troubles. Marshall had owned Alaska Airlines with the intent of getting money for himself and he was not concerned about the long-term stability of the company. In 1951, the CAB awarded Alaska Airlines with a temporary certificate allowing them to operate on routes from the Alaskan cities of Anchorage and Fairbanks to Seattle and Portland in the contiguous United States. This award became permanent in 1957.

In 1952, the CAB appointed Nelson David as president, and he began to improve the financial stability of the airline. By 1957, with the carrier in a better financial situation, David left and Charles Willis Jr., became the company's new president and CEO. Willis was a highly decorated naval aviator in World War II, founder of his own cargo airline, Willis Air Service (1945–1949), and a former political operative for President Eisenhower. Willis introduced several marketing gimmicks that set the airline apart from other ones of the day; namely, under his leadership, Alaska Airlines became the first to show inflight movies. The company began service with the Douglas DC-6, the airline's first pressurized plane, enabling flights above clouds and weather disturbances. On these DC-6s, the airline introduced "Golden Nugget" service, which included an on-board saloon and piano.

=== Jet age (1960s) ===
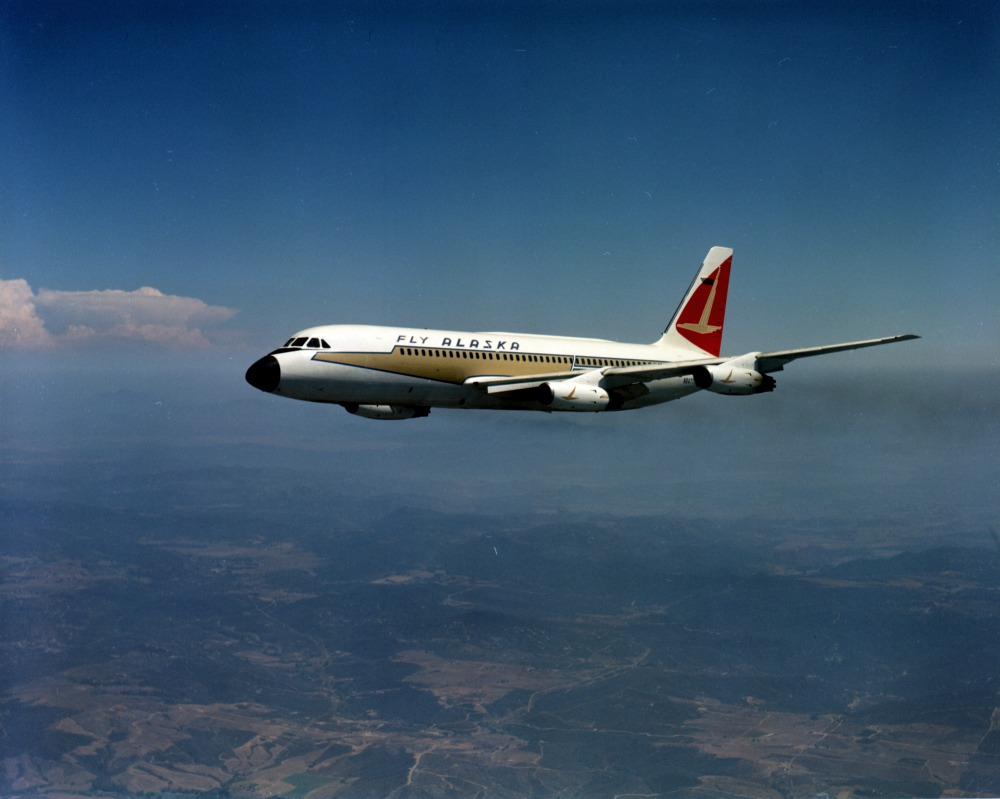
The Convair 880 was Alaska Airlines' first jet aircraft

In 1961, competitors began introducing jets on routes Alaska Airlines flew. To counter this competition, Willis negotiated with aircraft manufacturer Convair to purchase a Convair 880 jetliner with no money down, for use on routes between Alaska and the contiguous United States. The company introduced the new jet aircraft in 1961. In 1966 the company received its first Boeing 727-100 jets. They removed the Convair 880 from the fleet as a financing condition by Boeing concerning the purchase of the 727 jetliners. Several of Alaska's first 727s were series 100C models, which could be operated as all-cargo freighters, an all-passenger configuration or as mixed passenger/freight combi aircraft.

In the spring of 1967, greatly increased passenger loads required a quick addition of fleet aircraft. Alaska purchased a Convair 990 jetliner, formerly operated by Brazilian air carrier Varig as PP-VJE, which then became Alaska Airlines N987AS. This aircraft remained in service along with an increased fleet of Boeing 727-100s. They were joined by stretched Boeing 727-200s which became Alaska Airlines' signature aircraft for the next 25 years. It became the first carrier to fly the Lockheed L-100 Hercules L382 model, the civil version of the military C-130 cargo turboprop, which was used to transport oil drilling rigs to Alaska's North Slope and later to Ecuador.

Alaska also owned Lockheed Constellation propliners including two Lockheed L-1649A Starliners from 1962 to 1968, and three L-1049's which were used for Military Air Transport Service operations. Smaller prop and turboprop aircraft were operated, including the Convair 240, de Havilland Canada DHC-6 Twin Otter and Super Catalina amphibian aircraft as well as two versions of the Grumman Goose amphibian aircraft, one with piston engines and the other model is a conversion to turboprop engines which the airline called the "Turbo-Goose". The Catalina and Grumman amphibian seaplane aircraft joined the fleet when the airline acquired local southeast Alaska operator Alaska Coastal Airlines in 1968.

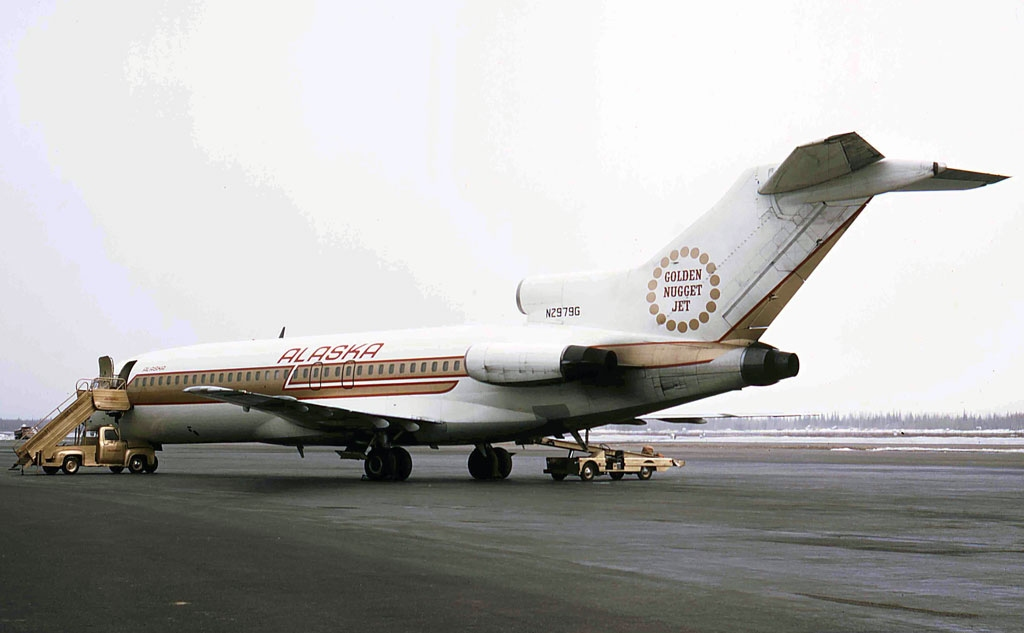
A Boeing 727-193, type introduced in the mid 1960s

During this time, Alaska Air faced some tough competition from other airlines, such as Northwest Airlines, Pan Am, and Pacific Northern Airlines, an Alaska-based air carrier operating Boeing 720 jetliners that was acquired by and merged into Western Airlines in 1967. Northwest and Pan Am at different times operated Boeing 747 wide-body jetliners on their services to Alaska with Northwest flying Seattle–Anchorage nonstop with the jumbo jet and Pan Am flying Seattle–Fairbanks nonstop with the 747. To set itself apart from the competition, Alaska Air turned to some cheap but imaginative gimmicks such as having safety instructions read as rhymes, staging fashion shows in the aisles, and having bingo games on board while en route.

In December 1962, Air Guinée signed a contract with Alaska Airlines, which had Alaska Airlines providing management expertise, in addition to two Douglas DC-4s. The deal would have had Alaska Airlines contracting with the airline over seven years. The contract ended after six months, leading to the United States Agency for International Development paying a US$700,000 debt owed by the Guinean airline to Alaska Airlines.

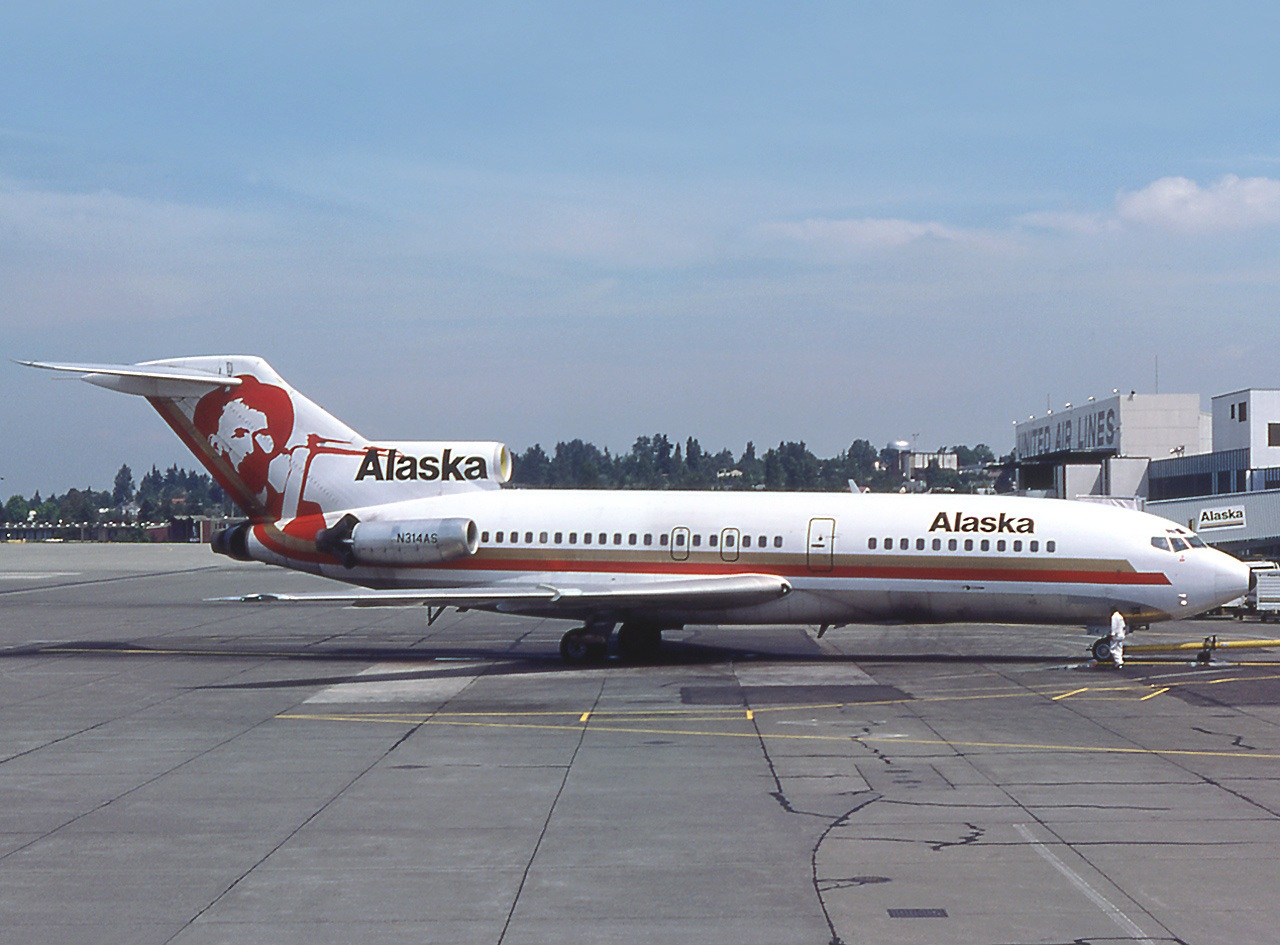
A Boeing 727-100 at Seattle–Tacoma International Airport in the mid 70s livery

In 1965, Alaska Airlines turned over some routes between small Alaskan communities, and some smaller aircraft, to Wien Air Alaska. This allowed Alaska to focus on more heavily travelled routes and allowed them to sell off smaller aircraft.

Throughout the 1960s, Alaska Airlines worked to promote tourism to Alaska by offering charter flights to the continental United States. In an attempt to increase the state's appeal, Alaska Airlines conducted a promotional tour of Japan in 1963. In 1967, as the state of Alaska celebrated its centennial, Alaska Airlines introduced a promotional "Gay Nineties" theme with stewardesses dressed in Edwardian outfits. That year, Alaska Airlines expanded to southeast Alaska with the introduction of service to Sitka. This led to the purchase of two smaller airlines, Alaska Coastal Airlines and Cordova Airlines, in 1968.

=== Economic hardship (1970s) ===
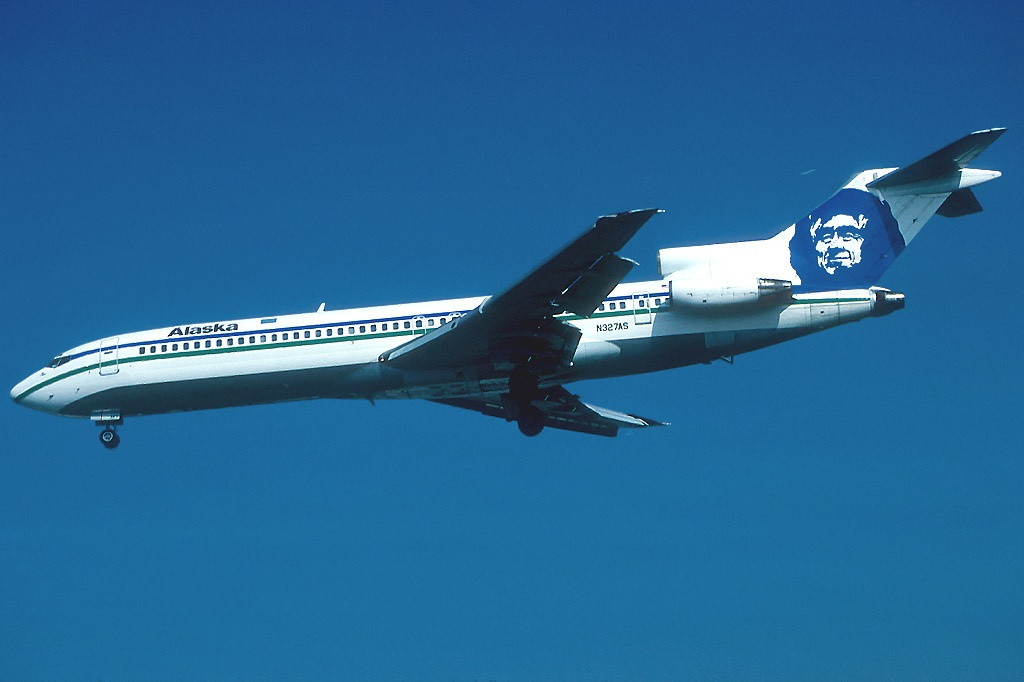
A Boeing 727-200Adv in the "happy face" livery

In the beginning of the 1970s, Alaska Airlines began Boeing 707 charter flights to Siberia in the Soviet Union. This was the result of three years of secret negotiations between Alaska Airlines and Soviet authorities, in which the US Department of State reluctantly chose not to block the plan for fear of a potentially negative response from the Soviets. The airline gained permission to fly more than two dozen flights in 1970, 1971, and 1972. Alaska Airlines was also operating Boeing 707, Boeing 720, and Boeing 720B jetliners in scheduled passenger service between destinations in Alaska and Seattle during the early and mid 1970s.

Like much of the airline industry at the time, Alaska Airlines was hit with rising fuel and operating costs and was on the verge of bankruptcy. Additionally, revenues were significantly reduced when work on the Trans-Alaska Pipeline System was delayed. The airline's cargo aircraft had played a key role in building the pipeline, but now sat idle. The airline took another blow on September 4, 1971, when a Boeing 727-100 jetliner crashed on landing in Juneau, killing 111 people and resulting in America's worst single-plane crash at the time. Because the airline was struggling financially, Alaska Airlines' board ousted president and CEO Charles Willis. Former board member Ronald Cosgrave succeeded him.

The airline was US$22 million in debt when Cosgrave took over, resulting in major cuts. The airline's cargo business was dropped completely, as were many flights and employees. Cosgrave also sought to improve the airline's tarnished image of "Elastic Airlines", referring to its poor schedule keeping. The logo was changed to an image of a smiling Inuk man, which remains today. Although the exact identity of the man is unknown, some believe it to be the face of either Chester Seveck, a reindeer herder in Kotzebue, or Oliver Amouak, an Inupiat man. Both were Alaskan natives. As a result of these efforts, the airline made a profit in 1973 and continued to be profitable thereafter.

=== Post-deregulation expansion (1978–1990) ===
Alaska Airlines was one of only three US carriers that supported the 1978 Airline Deregulation Act, knowing that it would reap significant growth and other benefits from deregulation. After deregulation, the company's real-estate division was spun off into its own company, with Cosgrave becoming its chairman. The leadership of the airline was passed to Bruce Kennedy, a close associate of Cosgrave. Cosgrave allied with Alaska Airlines to purchase competitor Wien Air Alaska. This ultimately failed and resulted in fines for Alaska Air and its leaders for improprieties during the attempted acquisition. Wien Air was liquidated in 1984, and never merged into Alaska Airlines.

At the time of deregulation, Alaska Airlines served ten cities in Alaska and one in the contiguous US—the city of Seattle—and it had only ten planes in its fleet. Immediately after deregulation, the airline began to expand, adding the cities of Portland and San Francisco to its network. Soon later, the airline resumed services to the Alaskan cities Nome and Kotzebue, and it introduced service to Palm Springs, California. Burbank and Ontario were added in 1981. In 1979, Alaska studied the possibility of acquiring and merging with Hughes Air West, but the plan never went through. By 1985, the airline had also added service to Oakland and San Jose in California, Spokane in Washington, Boise in Idaho, and Phoenix and Tucson in Arizona.

Deregulation also brought challenges to the airline. The airline was faced with increased competition and inflation that put tremendous pressure on costs, profits, and salaries. By 1979, competitors Northwest Airlines and Western Airlines were both flying wide-body McDonnell Douglas DC-10 jets on the core Anchorage–Seattle nonstop route. Additional competition came from Wien Air Alaska, which had begun flying nonstop jet service between Anchorage and Seattle. Northwest was operating nonstop DC-10 service on the Fairbanks–Seattle route at this time as well. There were tensions with unions, particularly mechanics and flight attendants. In 1985, the company had a three-month-long strike with its machinists. By June 1985, it was able to end the strike by promising to reduce labor costs and maintain peace with unions. In November 1985, the airline introduced a daily air-freight service called Gold Streak, with service to and from Alaska.

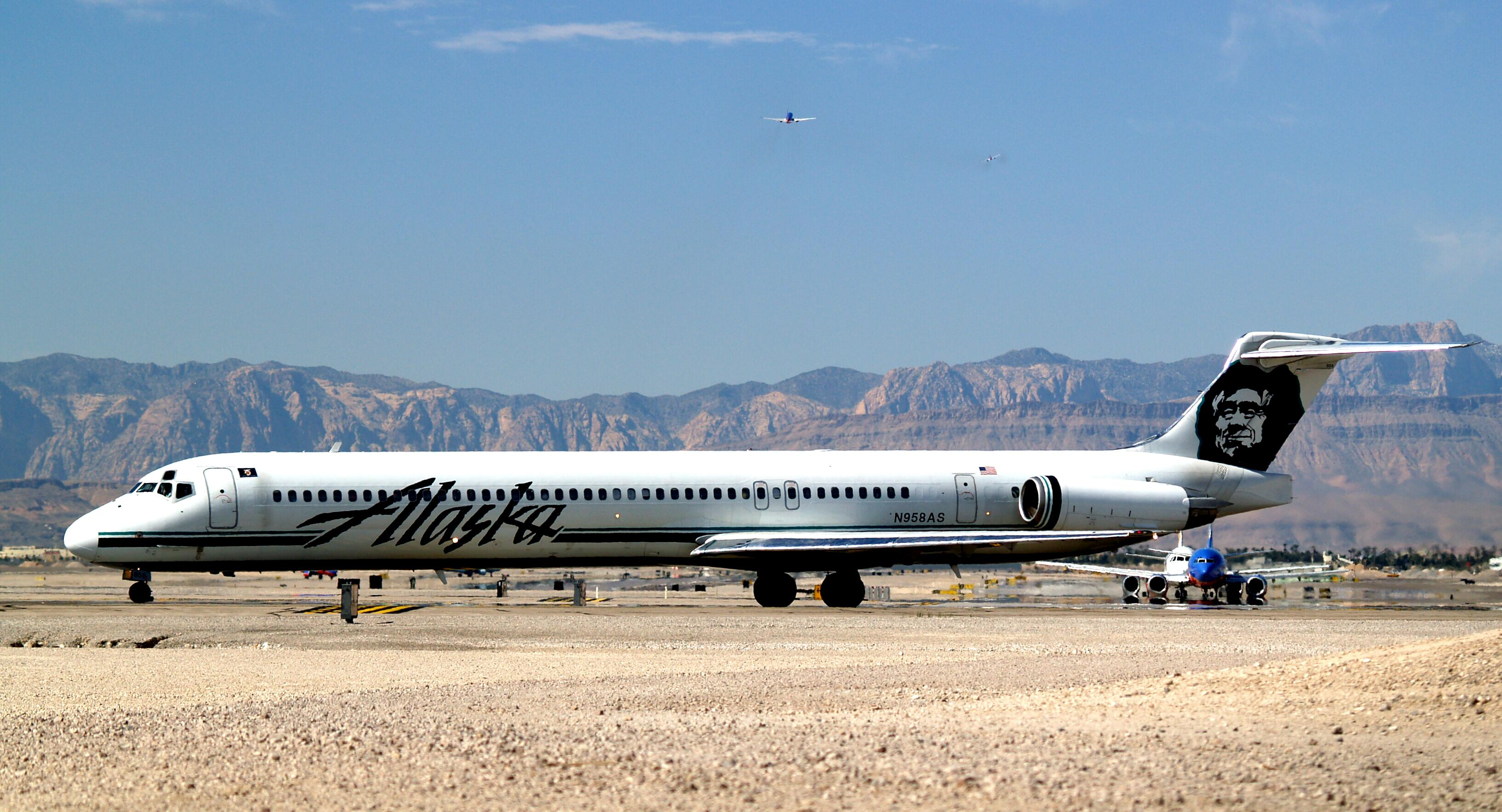
Alaska Airlines was the launch customer for the MD-83 and operated the type throughout the 1980s and 1990s

In the 1980s, Alaska Airlines began acquiring McDonnell Douglas MD-80s to replace its aging 727s. Alaska was the launch customer for the MD-83, taking delivery of its first MD-80s in 1985.

Also in 1985, the Alaska Air Group was formed as a holding company for Alaska Airlines. In 1986 Alaska Air Group acquired regional airline Horizon Air, which remained a separate brand from Alaska Airlines. Since then, both airlines have been subsidiaries of Alaska Air Group. In 1987, Alaska Airlines purchased Jet America Airlines. Alaska initially operated Jet America as a separate airline, but this proved economically unviable and Jet America's operations were merged into Alaska's. Alaska discontinued all flights to the Midwest and the East coast formerly operated by Jet America. Additional MD-80s entered the fleet via the acquisition of Jet America Airlines in 1987.

To compensate for a major seasonal imbalance in travel to Alaska (mostly taking place in the summer), the airline introduced service to Mexican resort cities, where most travel takes place in the winter. In 1988, the airline began servicing the Mexican resort cities of Mazatlán and Puerto Vallarta. By the end of the 1980s, 70 percent of Alaska Airlines' passengers flew south of Seattle and the airline served 30 cities in 6 states outside Alaska.

=== New competition, new technologies (1990s) ===
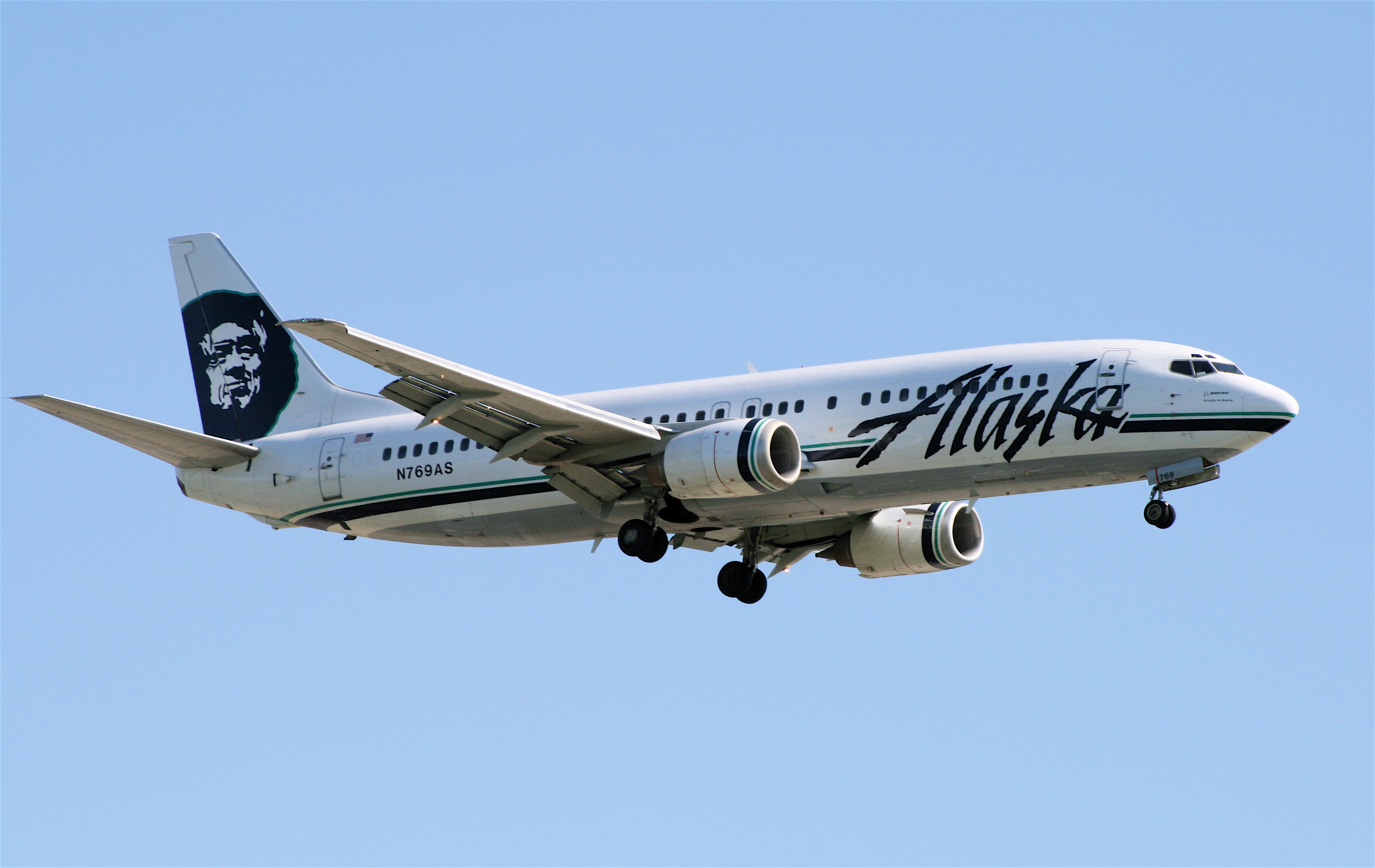
737-400

The airline began the 1990s with plans to lease 24 Boeing 737-400s from International Lease Finance Corporation (ILFC). The first aircraft was delivered in April 1992.

In 1991, Alaska Airlines added several routes. In the Russian Far East, it added the cities of Magadan and Khabarovsk, as well as service to Toronto, its first Canadian city and the first city east of the Rocky Mountains. Toronto was later dropped in 1992 and the Russian destinations were discontinued in 1998.

As the airline marked its 19th consecutive year of profits in a turbulent industry and racked up many awards for customer service, Bruce Kennedy retired in May 1991 and was succeeded by Raymond J. Vecci.

During this time, Alaska Airlines faced increased competition from low-cost carriers, namely MarkAir. Since it began operating in 1984, competition had been reduced due to feeder agreements with Alaska Airlines. However, after Alaska Air declined to buy the airline in the fall of 1991, competition with Alaska intensified. MarkAir offered low-cost service on the Anchorage-Seattle route and other routes in Alaska, where Alaska Airlines earned almost one-third of its revenues. For the first time in 20 years, it posted a loss of US$121 million.

To save money, the airline canceled two proposed maintenance facilities and deferred a large aircraft purchase worth US$2 billion. Deferred maintenance from this period of cost-cutting would ultimately cause the crash of Flight 261 in 2000, but at the time, this increased the usability of their fleet, and as a result, revenue. The deferred maintenance also cut labor costs, saving the airline money but increasing tensions between the airline and labor unions. The cost reductions produced quick results. In 1993, their losses decreased to US$45 million and they made a US$40 million profit the next year. Eight percent of these revenues were generated by record-setting cargo operations.

Alaska had more competition in 1993 when low-cost airline Southwest Airlines entered the Pacific Northwest by purchasing Morris Air. Alaska Airlines was able to keep its costs down, but it maintained its high level of customer service. The airline promoted itself as "the last great airline" and with the motto "For the same price, you just get more". Analysts felt that Alaska Air needed deeper cost cuts. At the same time, the company had many strikes by the flight attendants' union. Ultimately, Vecci was dismissed in 1995 and replaced with John Kelly, the former Horizon Air CEO. The airline soon expanded West Coast routes to take advantage of an "open skies" agreement between the US and Canada.

Alaska continued to take delivery of new MD-83s during the 1990s, both to meet the demands of a growing route system and to replace its aging and fuel inefficient 727 fleets. Their last 727 was retired in March 1994. The airline's MD-80 fleet peaked at 44 aircraft in 1996.

Alaska Airlines pioneered some new technologies through the 1990s. It added a heads-up guidance system in 1989 to operate better in foggy conditions, becoming the first airline to use this technology. In 1995, the airline became the first U.S. airline to sell tickets on the Internet. By 2000, all the airline's planes carried automated external defibrillators, for use in in-flight emergencies. The airline installed self-service kiosks called "Instant Travel Machines" that printed boarding passes, allowing customers to bypass the traditional ticket counter. An X-ray device, an addition to the unit allowing passengers to check their own baggage was being tested in 1999 at Anchorage.

This concept, known as "Airport of the Future" by the airline, was first tested in Anchorage and was later brought to its Seattle hub, and it drew attention from other airlines. The airline was the first airline in the world to integrate GPS and Enhanced Ground Proximity Warning System (EGPWS) technology, adding a real-time, three-dimensional display of terrain. The system was operational in all the carrier's Boeing 737-400s by April 1999.

The late 1990s saw the carrier recording much profitability. The airline added new training and maintenance facilities. The airline began buying new 737s, ordering three Boeing 737-700s and became the launch customer for the Boeing 737-900 when it placed an order for ten of the jets in November 1997.

=== Introducing flights across the U.S. (2000s) ===
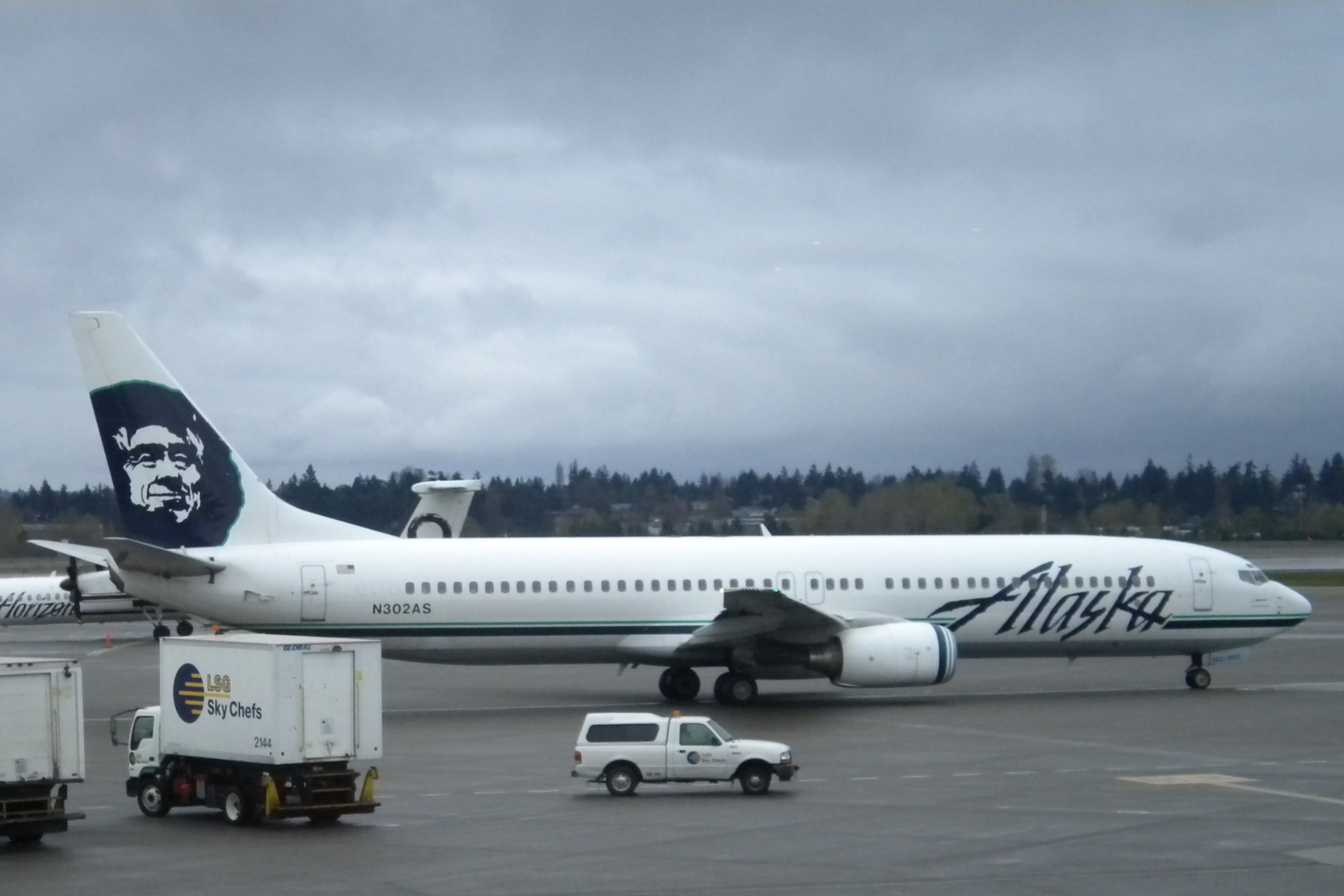
A Boeing 737-900 at Seattle–Tacoma International Airport. Alaska was the launch customer of the Boeing 737-900 aircraft.

In May 2001, the airline took delivery of its first 737-900. In 2001, the airline was granted slot exemptions by the Department of Transportation to operate a nonstop flight from Ronald Reagan Washington National Airport to Seattle, but it was halted after only a week due to the September 11 attacks. The airline resumed service to Reagan Airport on December 4, 2001, to meet the demand.

In January 2002, William Ayer was named CEO of Alaska Airlines. Ayer had been serving as president under Kelly since 1997, having come to Alaska from Horizon two years earlier after spending 13 years with the smaller airline. Ayer took over as chairman and CEO of the Alaska in 2002 upon Kelly's retirement. He led the company through a transformation called Alaska 2010 that was intended to insulate the airline from the traditional boom-bust cycle of the airline industry.

In 2003, Alaska Airlines won the Technology Leadership Award from the magazine Air Transport World for its pioneering of new technologies both in the airport and within the airplane itself.

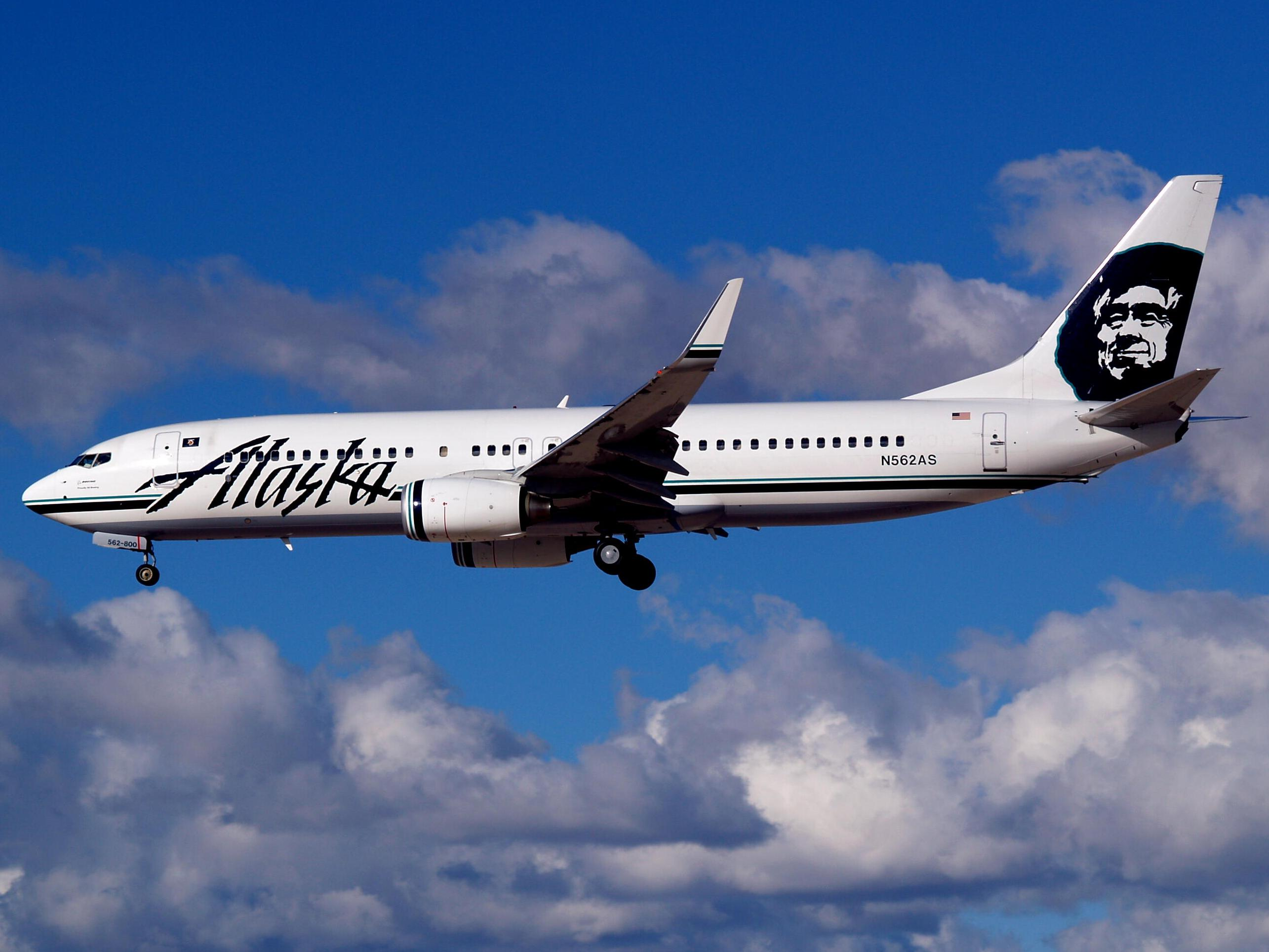
The Boeing 737-800 replaced the airline's MD-83's, which were retired in August 2008.

In 2005, due to the greater efficiency of the Boeing 737 Next Generation and rising costs for maintenance, fuel, and crew training, Alaska Airlines decided to phase out its remaining 26 MD-80s and trained its pilots to fly the newer Boeing 737-800s that were being ordered to replace them. According to the airline, the MD-80 burned 1,100 US gallons (4,200 L) of fuel per hour, while the 737-800 burned just 850 US gallons (3,200 L) per hour. The last MD-80 flights flew in August 2008, with one flight from San Jose to Seattle and another from Sacramento to Seattle. To mark its transition to an all-Boeing fleet, Alaska Airlines unveiled a 737-800 called Spirit of Seattle with Boeing's house colors painted on the fuselage and the airline's Inuit logo painted on the tail fin.

Also in 2005, Alaska Airlines contracted out many of its jobs, including ground crew positions, to Menzies Aviation. In some cases, this resulted in an almost 40% decline in wages. This agreement was found to be a violation of union agreements in 2008 and the new ground crews caused enough damage to aircraft in the first year to make the savings negligible. In addition, Menzies contractors gained a reputation of stealing from checked bags after a few incidents in 2007.

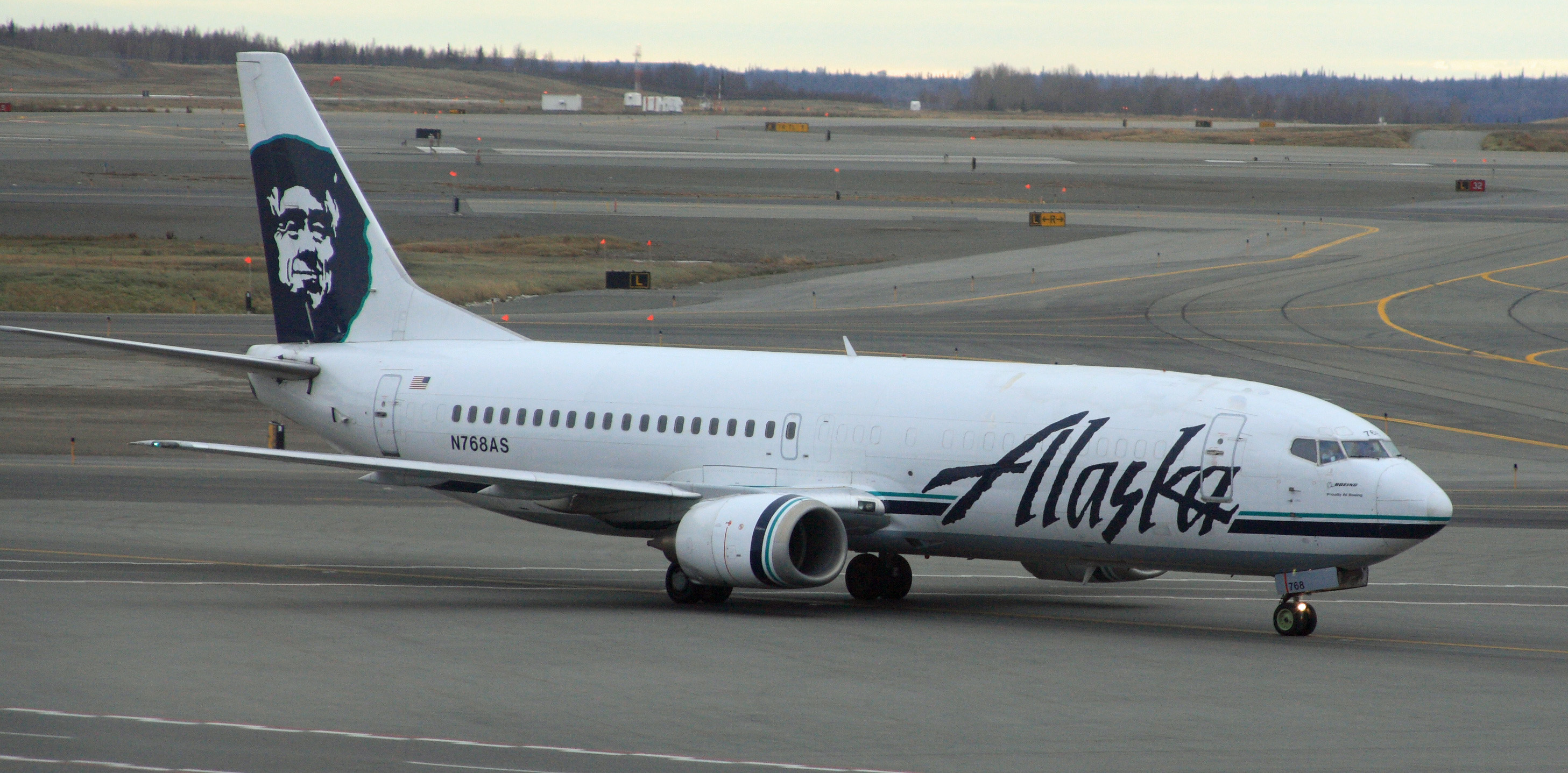
A passenger/freighter 737-400 at Ted Stevens Anchorage International Airport

Starting in June 2006, Alaska Airlines introduced new cargo aircraft to the fleet: five 737-400C combi aircraft and one 737-400F freighter. The aircraft were originally purchased by Alaska as passenger aircraft in 1992, and converted by Pemco Air Services. The 737-400C "combi" aircraft were uniquely suited for the needs of Alaska, carrying a combination of four cargo pallets and 72 passengers, allowing goods and people to be transported to remote towns. 737-400 based aircraft had 20% more passenger and cargo capacity than the aging Boeing 737-200 cargo aircraft they replaced.

=== 2010s ===
In March 2010, Alaska Airlines began service from San Jose, California, to Kahului and Kona, Hawaii, and also from Sacramento, California, to Kahului, Hawaii.

In September 2010, Alaska Airlines began service between Seattle and Lambert-St. Louis International Airport.

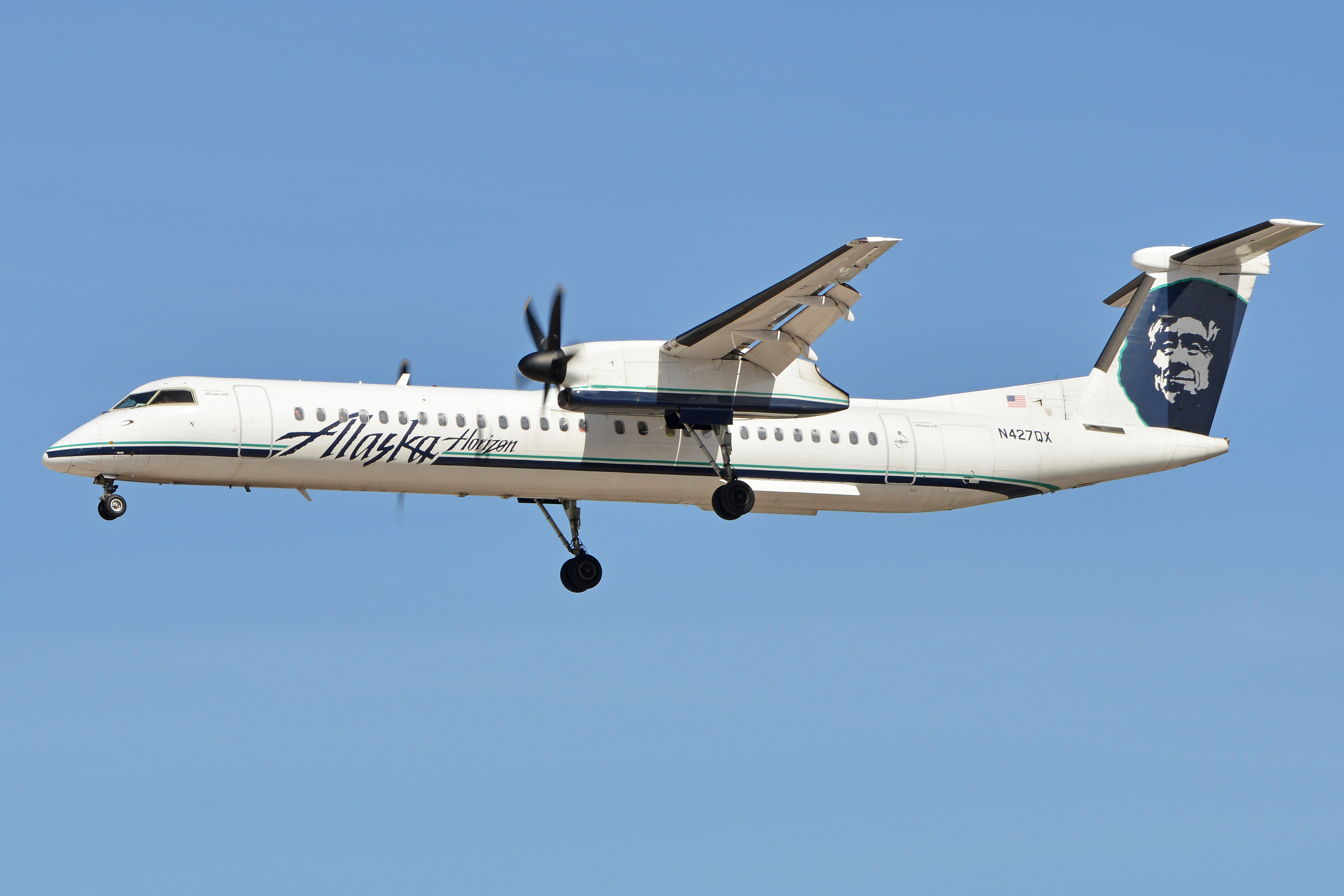
A De Havilland Canada DHC 8 Series 400 following the retirement of the Horizon Air brand

In 2011, Horizon Air no longer operated as a separate regional airline. Instead, it transitioned to a capacity purchase agreement (CPA) business model, which had by that time become the regional airline industry standard. Under the CPA, Horizon operates and maintains its aircraft, while Alaska Airlines is responsible for scheduling, marketing and pricing all flights. As part of the change to the new business model, the Horizon Air brand was retired and all Horizon planes were repainted with a co-branded "Alaska Horizon" livery.

Alaska Airlines entered into a similar capacity purchase agreement with the nation's largest regional airline, SkyWest Airlines. Starting in May 2011, SkyWest started operating several routes for Alaska under the brand "Alaska SkyWest".

In January 2011, Alaska Airlines placed an order for thirteen Boeing 737-900ERs to be delivered between 2012 and 2014, with two 737-800s also part of the order.

In 2011, Alaska Airlines partnered with Boeing and Fujitsu to be the first to use a new technology called Component Management Optimization to streamline maintenance checks. It allows mechanics to point a handheld device at little RFID tags attached to certain parts of the aircraft, which will display information about when parts were last replaced. This will allow mechanics to perform inspections quicker than conventional methods. The program was scheduled to launch in 2012.

In mid 2011, the airline issued iPads to its pilots to replace 25 pounds of paper flight manuals that pilots were required to carry on flights (Electronic flight bag). Alaska Airlines is the first major airline to use iPads on flights. All pilots had iPads by June 2011. This was the first part of the airline's initiative to do away with the flight bag. The airline is considering using iPads for displaying aeronautical charts.

In November 2011, Alaska Airlines flew 75 commercial passenger flights in the U.S. powered by biofuel, using a 20 percent blend of sustainable biofuel made from used cooking oil that meets rigorous international safety and sustainability standards.

On February 16, 2012, Alaska Airlines' CEO, Bill Ayer, retired. Ayer became the airline's CEO in 2002 and has been credited with reducing costs and keeping the airline profitable without going through bankruptcy. The airline's president Brad Tilden became the new CEO on May 15, 2012.

In March 2012, Alaska Airlines began service from Seattle to Kansas City and in June 2012, began service to Philadelphia. Seattle-Tacoma-Miami International Airport flights ended in July 2012. Service to nearby Fort Lauderdale began on July 16. Service to San Antonio began in September 2012. Alaska Airlines began service from San Diego to Orlando in October 2012.

In October 2012, Alaska placed the largest order in its history, when it ordered a total of 50 Boeing 737s in a deal worth US$5 billion at list prices. The order consists of 20 737 MAX 8s, 17 737 MAX 9s and 13 737-900ERs.

Alaska Airlines announced a plan in June 2013 to begin replacing Boeing 737s on flights between Fairbanks and Anchorage, Alaska, with Bombardier Q400s operated by Horizon Air and based out of Anchorage beginning in March 2014. The plan was intended to reduce operating expenses and eventually lower fares. It was met with a great deal of skepticism by Fairbanks residents who expressed their frustration about the safety of the aircraft and outside boarding in the cold winter climate through social media. Alaska Airlines responded to the comments on Facebook attempting to reassure passengers of the safety of the Bombardier Q400s as well as promising to address the unusual aspects of flying in Alaska. The airline ended up modifying one of the jetways at Fairbanks International Airport so that passengers would not have to go outside to board. In November 2017, Alaska announced that it would revert to an all-jet service in the state of Alaska and that it would close its Horizon Airbase in Anchorage in March 2018. Horizon would re-establish its presence in the state of Alaska two years later, this time flying Embraer 175 aircraft.

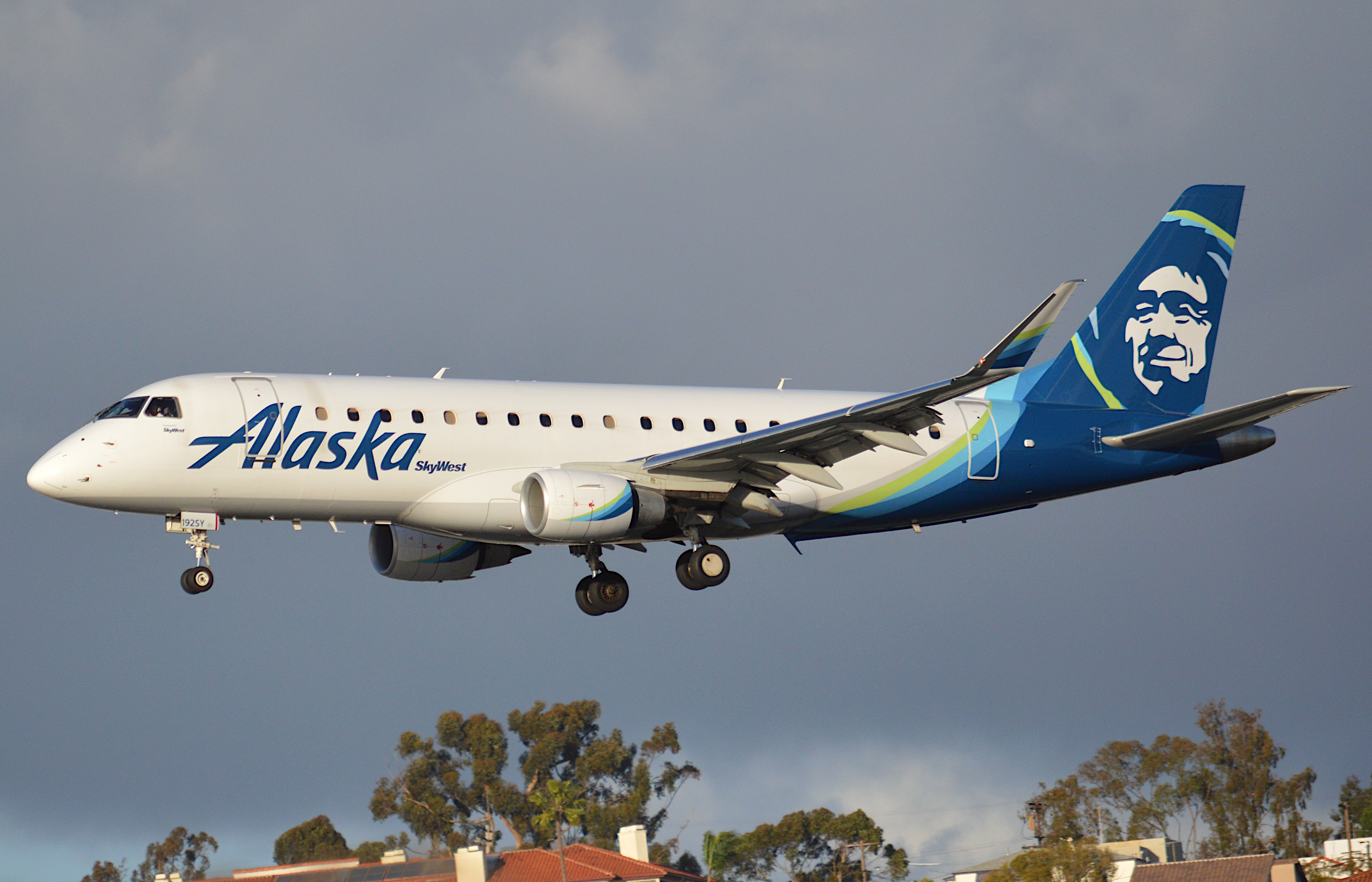
New logo and livery unveiled in 2016, displayed on a SkyWest Embraer 175 operated on Alaska Airlines behalf

New nonstop service from Seattle to Salt Lake City began in 2013 and from Seattle to Albuquerque, Baltimore, Detroit, New Orleans, Tampa, and Cancun all began in 2014. Several other routes were later added from Salt Lake City in a competitive move against Delta Air Lines when that carrier added many new routes from Seattle.

In 2015, Alaska Airlines announced three new nonstop destinations from Seattle, to Charleston, Nashville, and Raleigh-Durham. These, along with a flight between Los Angeles and Baltimore, began in late 2015 using their 737 aircraft.

In January 2016, for the first time in 25 years, Alaska Airlines unveiled a major update to its brand, which included a new logo and livery. In the new design, the Alaska wordmark was streamlined and the design of the Eskimo logo was simplified and the ruffs on the parka were made more colorful.

In 2017, Alaska Airlines expanded to Indianapolis, with non-stop service to Seattle in May and San Francisco in September. The San Francisco route was discontinued in September 2018.

In September 2018, Alaska Airlines added non-stop service from Seattle to Pittsburgh.

==== Virgin America acquisition and subsequent lawsuits ====
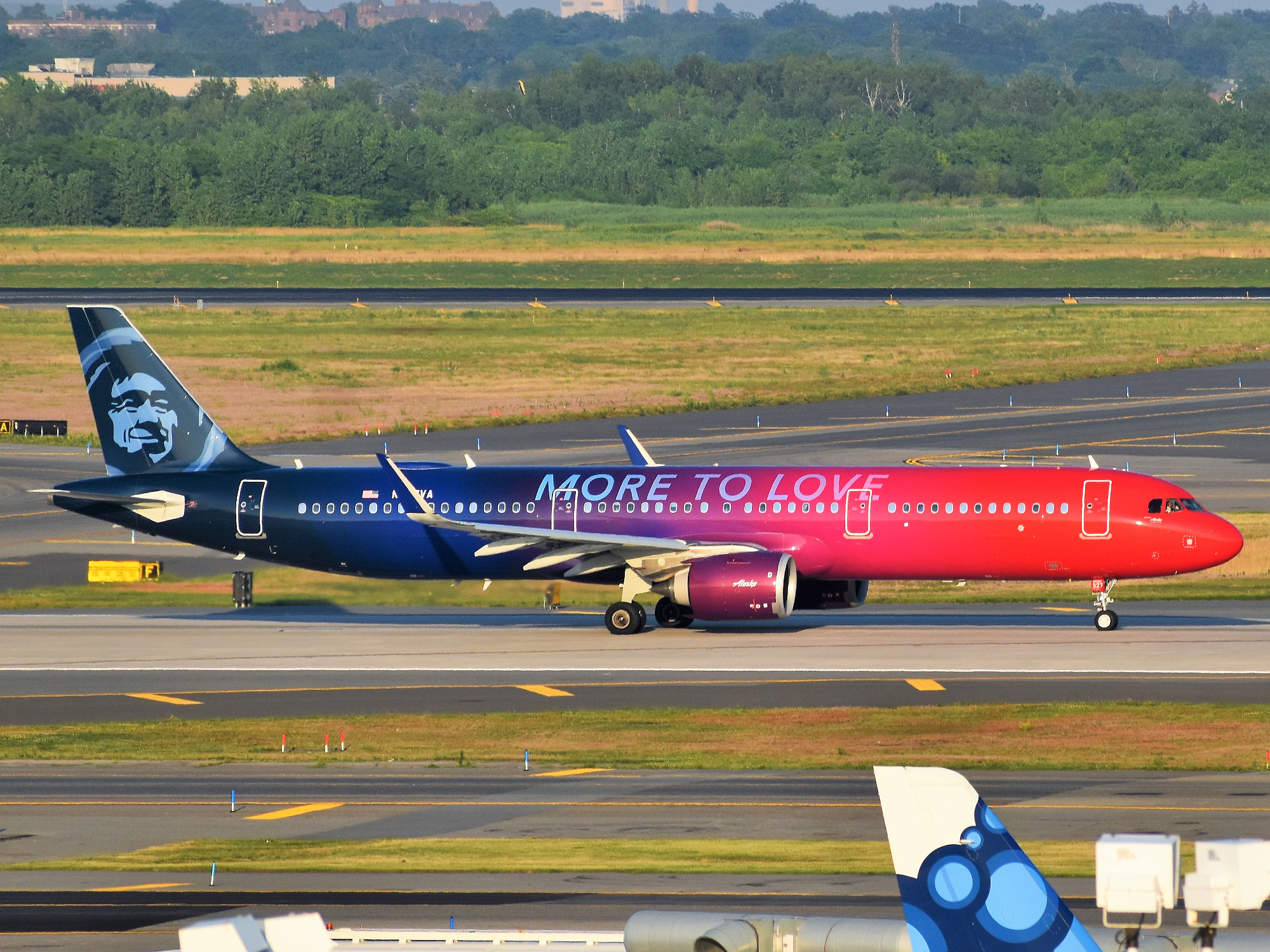
Following the acquisition of Virgin America, Alaska painted several aircraft, including this Airbus A321neo, in "More to Love" special livery to commemorate the merger

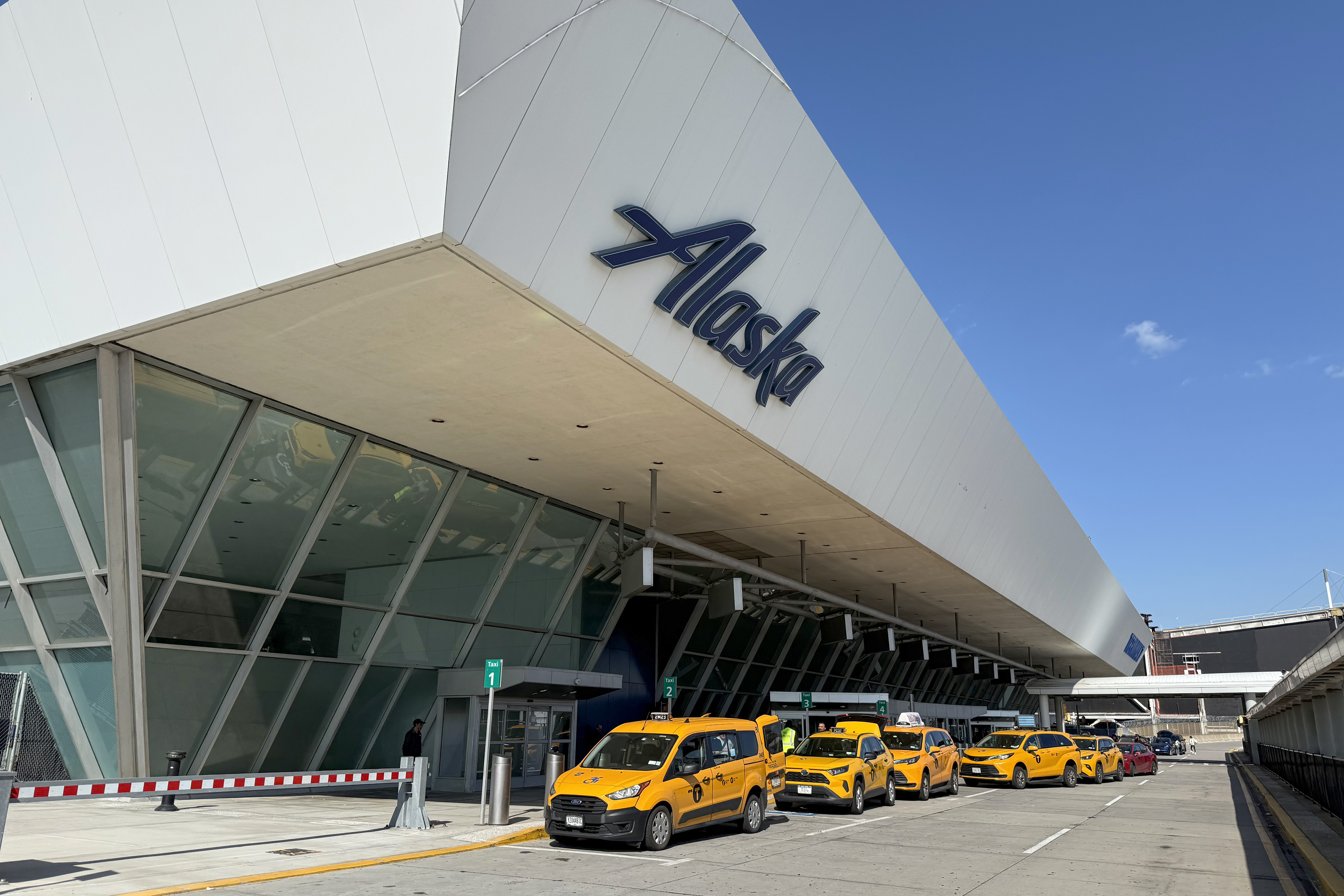
Virgin America's New York hub was consolidated into Terminal 7, expanding Alaska's East Coast presence

Virgin America, an airline based out of the San Francisco Bay Area, launched in 2005 and quickly drew a cult-like following. But as a growing startup airline, the airline would take several years to pay back start-up and expansion costs. Virgin's original investors wanted fast returns on their investments, so they took the airline public, trading on Nasdaq in November 2014. As the airline saw growing profits year after year, a frenzy ensued, and the airline's stock price climbed from $23 at time of IPO to nearly $30 per share within just a year.

Not long after Virgin America's successful IPO launch, JetBlue announced their intention to buy controlling interest in Virgin America. The two airlines had complimentary networks on opposite sides of the country and operated similar aircraft types in a similar market. Alaska viewed its acquisition of Virgin America as a start to expanding in California and the West Coast. After the acquisition was announced, Richard Branson, the head of the Virgin Group and one of the founders of Virgin America, described himself as "sad" and disappointed. Despite the protest from its most high-profile shareholder, the majority of Virgin America's shareholders voted to approve the sale to Alaska Air Group because of the higher offer than that of JetBlue.

Alaska Air Group purchased Virgin America for $57 per share, a total valuation of $2.6 billion, with additional expenses bringing the cost to approximately $4 billion. The acquisition was completed on December 14, 2016.

The DOT issued a single operating certificate for the combined airlines in January 2018. The airlines merged into the same passenger service system in April 2018, meaning that most of the customer-facing portions of the company, including flight numbers, website, mobile apps, and airport check-in kiosks, have a single brand: Alaska Airlines. Virgin America's final flight was in April 2018.

Prior to the acquisition, Alaska operated an all-Boeing 737 fleet of aircraft, but Virgin America operated an all-Airbus fleet. At the time of the merger, it was unclear whether Alaska Airlines would retain the Airbus aircraft. The company estimated that maintaining the Airbus sub-fleet would cost between $20 million and $25 million annually. In July 2017, the CEO indicated that the company was leaning towards returning to an all-Boeing fleet, with a full announcement expected by the end of the year. The first Airbus leases expired in 2019, with the rest expiring between 2021 and 2024. In April 2020, in response to route suspensions stemming from the COVID-19 pandemic, Alaska grounded 19 inherited Virgin America aircraft, with 12 permanently retired and the other 7 unlikely to return to service. The airline is using pandemic-related flight reductions as an opportunity to retrain many Airbus pilots to fly the Boeing 737 instead. The final Airbus aircraft from the merger were phased out in 2023.

=== 2020s ===
Due to the economic effects of the COVID-19 pandemic, Alaska Airlines announced that it would be reducing its number of employees by 30%. By the end of 2020, the firm cut out around 7,000 job positions out of its 23,000 total.

In February 2020, Alaska Airlines announced its intention to join the Oneworld airline alliance. On March 31, 2021, Alaska Airlines officially joined the Oneworld alliance, adding seven new airline partners, including Iberia, Malaysia Airlines, Qatar Airways, Royal Air Maroc, Royal Jordanian, S7 Airlines, and SriLankan Airlines.

In December 2020, Alaska Airlines agreed to buy 23 Boeing 737 MAX 9 jets.

In November 2021, Alaska Airlines launched seasonal service to Belize, making it the fourth foreign country served by the airline.

In August 2022, Alaska Airlines was reported to be an investor in Twelve, a sustainable aviation fuel (SAF) start up and chemical technology company based in Berkeley, California, that aims to make fuel out of carbon dioxide instead of things like organic vegetable oils, which would supposedly be cheaper than existing SAF production. Twelve's E-Jet fuel would have 90% lower emissions than conventional fuel but not require changing existing aircraft. At proper scale, it would be cost competitive with existing fuel and help allow Alaska Airlines to meet emissions goals.

In October 2022, Alaska Airlines announced an agreement with Boeing to purchase 52 additional Boeing 737 MAX aircraft, the airline's largest aircraft order thus far.

In May 2022, Alaska Airlines removed their inflight magazine, Alaska Beyond, and moved to an airline blog due to COVID-19 cleaning procedures.

In January 2023, Alaska Airlines announced that it had officially dropped plastic cups from its inflight food and beverage services, becoming the first U.S. airline to do so. It said that the move is part of plans to replace its top five waste-producing items from onboard services by 2025.

In 2023, Alaska Airlines announced a partnership with Taiwan-based Starlux Airlines. Mokulele Airlines, a small commuter airline in Hawaii, and its parent company, Southern Airways Express, both became partner airlines in 2023. Porter Airlines, a Canadian airline, became a partner before starting service from Toronto to San Francisco, Los Angeles, and Las Vegas. A partnership with Kenmore Air was resumed in 2023, first introduced in 2010. Flights from Everett to the San Juan Islands became bookable on Alaska Airlines' website.

Alaska Airlines announced nonstop service to Guatemala and the Bahamas in June and July 2023. Bahamasair was announced as a partner airline at the same time service to the Bahamas was revealed.

In 2023, Alaska Airlines agreed to a settlement resolving claims that it misclassified certain workers and failed to pay proper wages. The lawsuit was filed under California labor laws and included allegations of wage and hour violations.

On April 17, 2024, the FAA announced a ground stop advisory for Alaska Airlines, stopping all of the airline's flights. The FAA did not announce a reason for this.

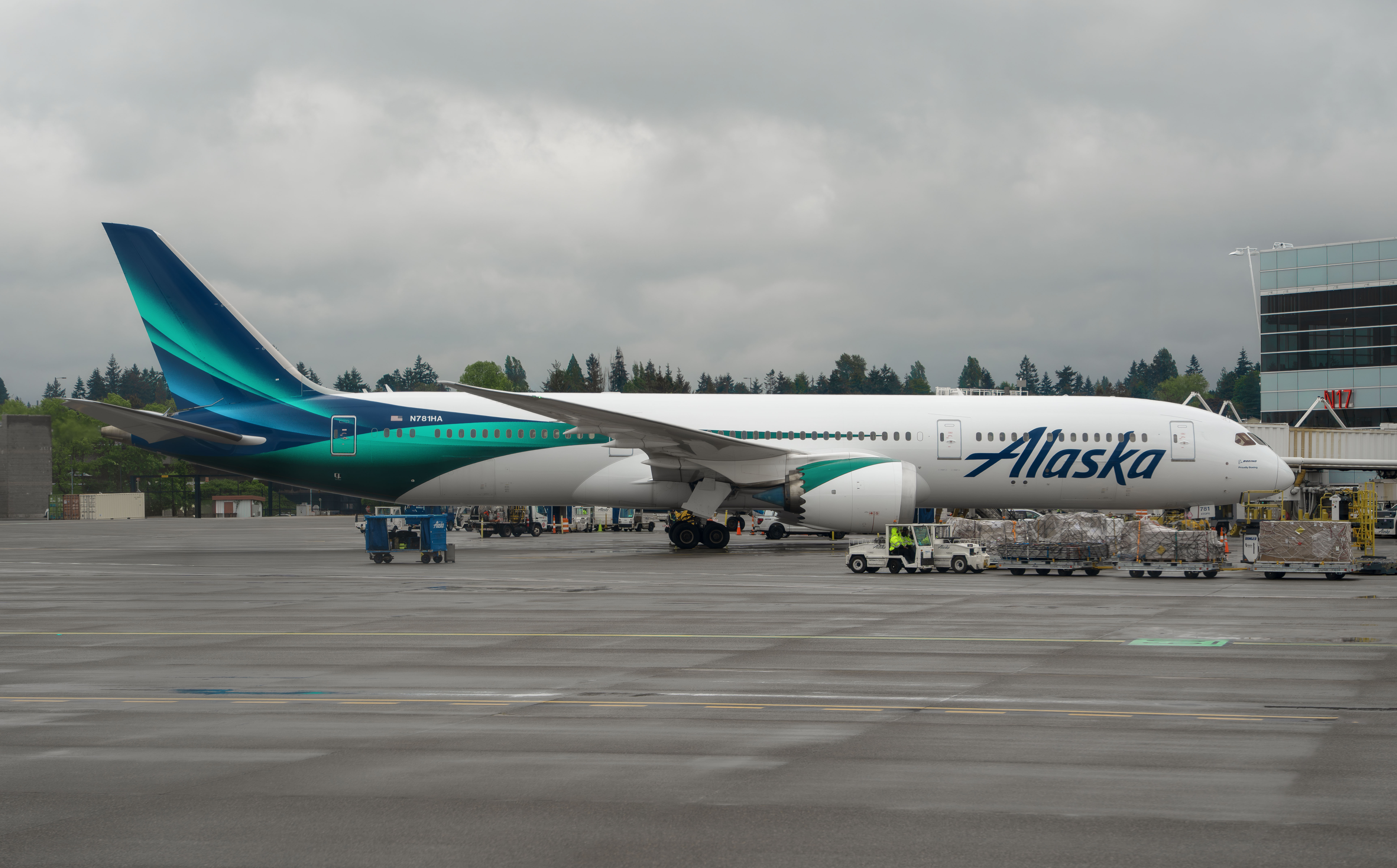
The first Alaska Airlines widebody - a Boeing 787-9 - painted in the new "global" livery

Alaska Airlines debuted a modified "global" livery based on the aurora borealis in January 2026, to be painted on its fleet of widebody planes that were acquired through the Hawaiian Airlines merger. The airline plans to add 12 intercontinental flights from its Seattle hub by 2030 using a fleet of 17 Boeing 787s and 24 Airbus A330s. That same month, Alaska announced the purchase of 110 new Boeing aircraft, making it the airline's single largest order in history. This was done as part of an aggressive expansion and fleet modernization plan to transition towards the 737 MAX and 787.

=== Acquisition of Hawaiian Airlines ===
In December 2023, Alaska Airlines announced that it would merge with Hawaiian Airlines for $1.9 billion in cash along with an assumption of approximately $900 million in outstanding debt. Airline industry analysts had promoted the merger for years which would create a combined carrier focused on the western United States. The merger would provide Alaska, which is primarily a domestic carrier with narrow-body aircraft, with Hawaiian's wide-body jets, pilots, and international networks.

The merger would retain both Alaska Airlines and Hawaiian Airlines as separate brands; Hawaiian Airlines would also become a Oneworld member. The two airlines intend to operate a combined frequent-flyer program, with Alaska's Mileage Plan likely to replace HawaiianMiles unless the companies opt for an all-new program. The proposed merger was approved by shareholders of Hawaiian Airlines in April 2024, following earlier approval from both Alaska Air Group and Hawaiian Holdings, Inc.

Under President Biden, the U.S. Department of Justice has worked to prevent further consolidation in the airline industry but it was initially unclear whether the department would file suit against the merger, with analysts noting differences between the proposal and prior proposals opposed by the administration. The main area of regulatory concern was that the deal would put about 40% of the traffic between Hawaii and the mainland U.S. in one company's hands. When the deal was announced, company executives expected approval from the Justice Department to take between a year and 18 months. On August 19, 2024, the U.S. Department of Justice completed its regulatory antitrust review of the proposed acquisition and declined to attempt to block the merger in court. The merger next requires the approval of the U.S. Department of Transportation.

At the time, the companies overlapped on 12 nonstop routes which they described as minimal. Alaska Airlines emphasized its experience operating an intra-Alaska network including service to 16 destinations not reachable by road while pledging to maintain a robust interisland schedule in Hawaii to neighbor islands. The Wall Street Journal speculated that consolidation would lead to higher prices for consumers on flights to Hawaii although this was disputed by the companies.

When the merger was announced, Governor Josh Green (HI) promised that he and the attorney general Anne Lopez would monitor the merger "very closely" adding that both "are very high-quality companies, but ultimately, I will be watching to make sure all of our state's needs are met and all of our workers are cared for." As part of its effort to garner local support for the merger, Alaska Airlines made three key promises to Hawaii residents to maintain the Hawaiian airlines brand, keep all front-line union employees, and protect neighbor island flights. In February 2024, Richard Bissen (mayor of Maui County), Rick Blangiardi (mayor of the City and County of Honolulu), Derek Kawakami (mayor of Kauai County), and Mitch Roth (mayor of Hawaiʻi County) published an open letter in the Honolulu Star-Advertiser declaring their support for the merger as "good for Hawaiʻi" and enhancing service to neighbor islands.

Alaska Airlines confirmed that miles held in Hawaiian's HawaiianMiles frequent-flyer program would be converted to the Alaska Airlines Mileage Plan scheme at a 1:1 ratio.

In August 2024, the regulatory review period ended without issue, a week after Alaska had agreed to extend that review period. The news effectively gave Alaska DOJ approval for the deal. Alaska called it "a significant milestone in the process to join our airlines." On September 17, 2024, the final regulatory hurdle for the merger was cleared when the United States Department of Transportation approved of the merger. The carriers stated they expected to close the deal in the days following this approval. On September 18, 2024, the merger was completed, following an agreement with the U.S. Department of Transportation. As part of the deal, both airlines committed to maintaining key routes in Hawaii and upholding consumer protections for the next six years.

== Network ==
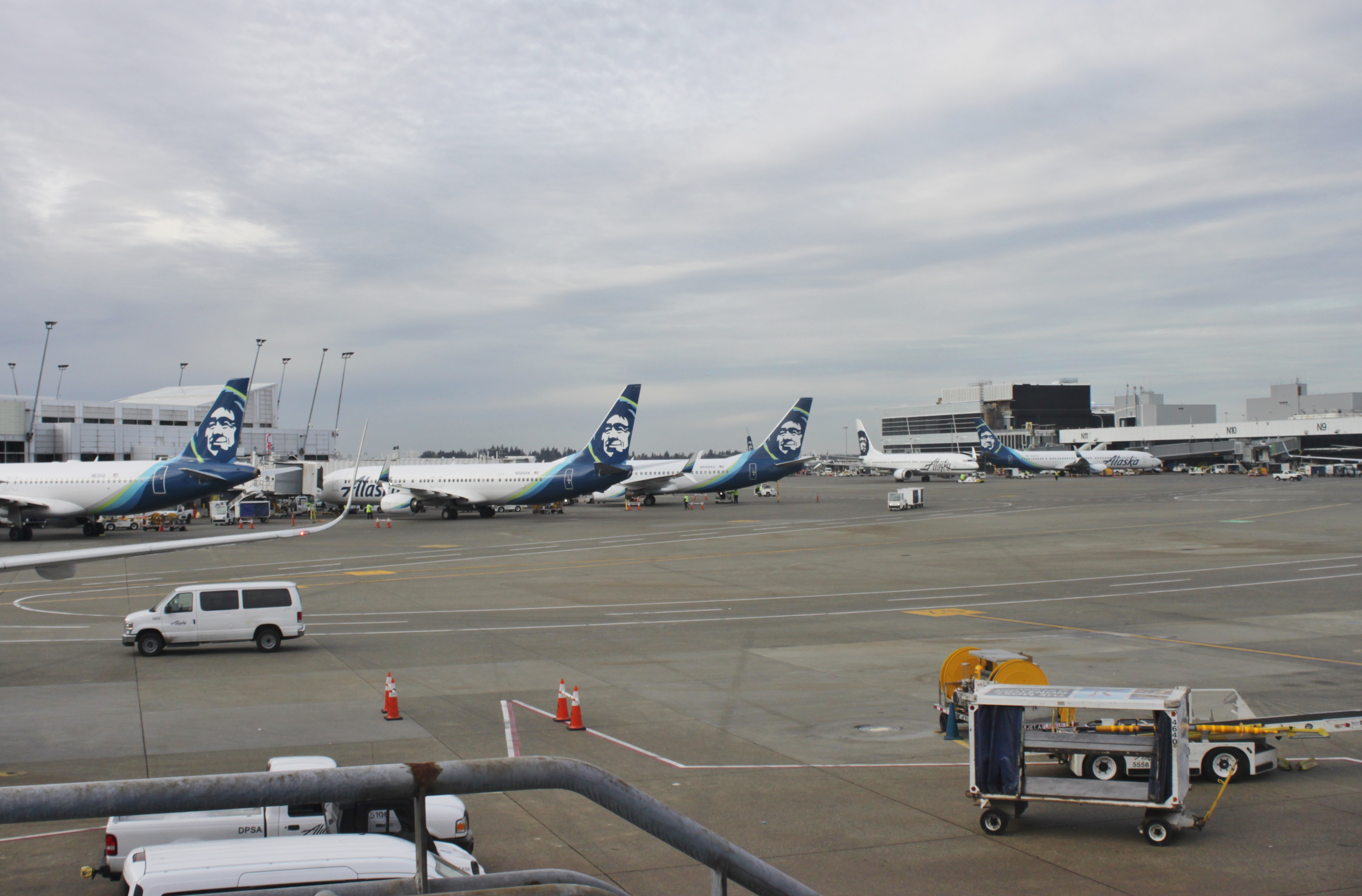
Alaska's operations at its primary hub, Seattle–Tacoma International Airport

Alaska's route system spans more than 115 destinations in the United States, Belize, Canada, Costa Rica, Guatemala, Japan, and Mexico. Some of the locations served in Alaska include Anchorage, Adak, Cordova, Fairbanks, Juneau, Ketchikan, Kodiak, Kotzebue, King Salmon, Nome, Prudhoe Bay, Sitka, and Utqiagvik (formerly Barrow), several of which are inaccessible by road.

The airline began scheduled operations to the Russian Far East in 1991 following the breakup of the Soviet Union, but suspended the service in 1998 following the 1998 Russian financial crisis.

Alaska has historically been one of the largest carriers on the West Coast of the United States, with strong presences in Anchorage, Seattle, Portland, and San Diego, and serving four airports in the Bay Area and four airports in the Los Angeles metropolitan area.

Some cities in Alaska's network with less traffic are served by regional airline partners under a capacity purchase agreement. Under that agreement, the regional airline is paid to operate and maintain aircraft used on flights that are scheduled and marketed by Alaska Airlines. Alaska's airline partners include wholly owned regional subsidiary Horizon Air and carrier SkyWest Airlines.

Alaska Air Group launched its first modern long-haul international route between Seattle and Tokyo/Narita on May 12, 2025. It uses Hawaiian Airlines' widebody Airbus A330-200 as a result of Hawaiian's merger with the Alaska Air Group. It is planned to be followed by a Seattle–Seoul/Incheon route in September of 2025 and ten more routes by 2030.

In the Spring of 2026, Alaska launched its nonstop services to London, Rome, and Keflavik with the latter served by a 737 MAX 8. In the Spring of 2027, Alaska will launch nonstop routes to Athens and Paris.

Alaska will have Aurora Suites on its new 787-9 and -10 variant. They will launch the suites aboard at least 25 of its 737 MAX 10’s, catering to cross-country business travellers.

In the spring of 2027, Alaska will launch nonstop services to Papeete and Osaka, aboard Hawaiian A330-200’s.

=== Joint ventures ===
Alaska Airlines have established joint ventures with the following airlines:

- American Airlines

=== Codeshare agreements ===
Alaska Airlines is a member of the Oneworld alliance and has codeshares or mileage partnerships with the following airlines:

- Aer Lingus
- Air Tahiti Nui
- Aleutian Airways
- American Airlines
- Bahamasair
- British Airways
- Cape Air
- Cathay Pacific
- Condor
- Contour Airlines
- Fiji Airways
- Finnair
- Hainan Airlines
- Hawaiian Airlines
- Iberia
- Icelandair
- Japan Airlines
- Kenmore Air
- Korean Air
- Malaysia Airlines
- Mokulele Airlines
- Oman Air
- Philippine Airlines
- Porter Airlines
- Qantas
- Qatar Airways
- Royal Air Maroc
- Royal Jordanian
- Southern Airways Express
- SriLankan Airlines
- Starlux Airlines

=== Interline agreements ===
Alaska Airlines has Interline agreements with the following airlines:

- Air India
- Air Premia
- Azores Airlines
- Breeze Airways
- Caribbean Airlines
- Emirates
- French Bee
- LATAM Chile
- Norse Atlantic
- Singapore Airlines
- WestJet

== Fleet ==
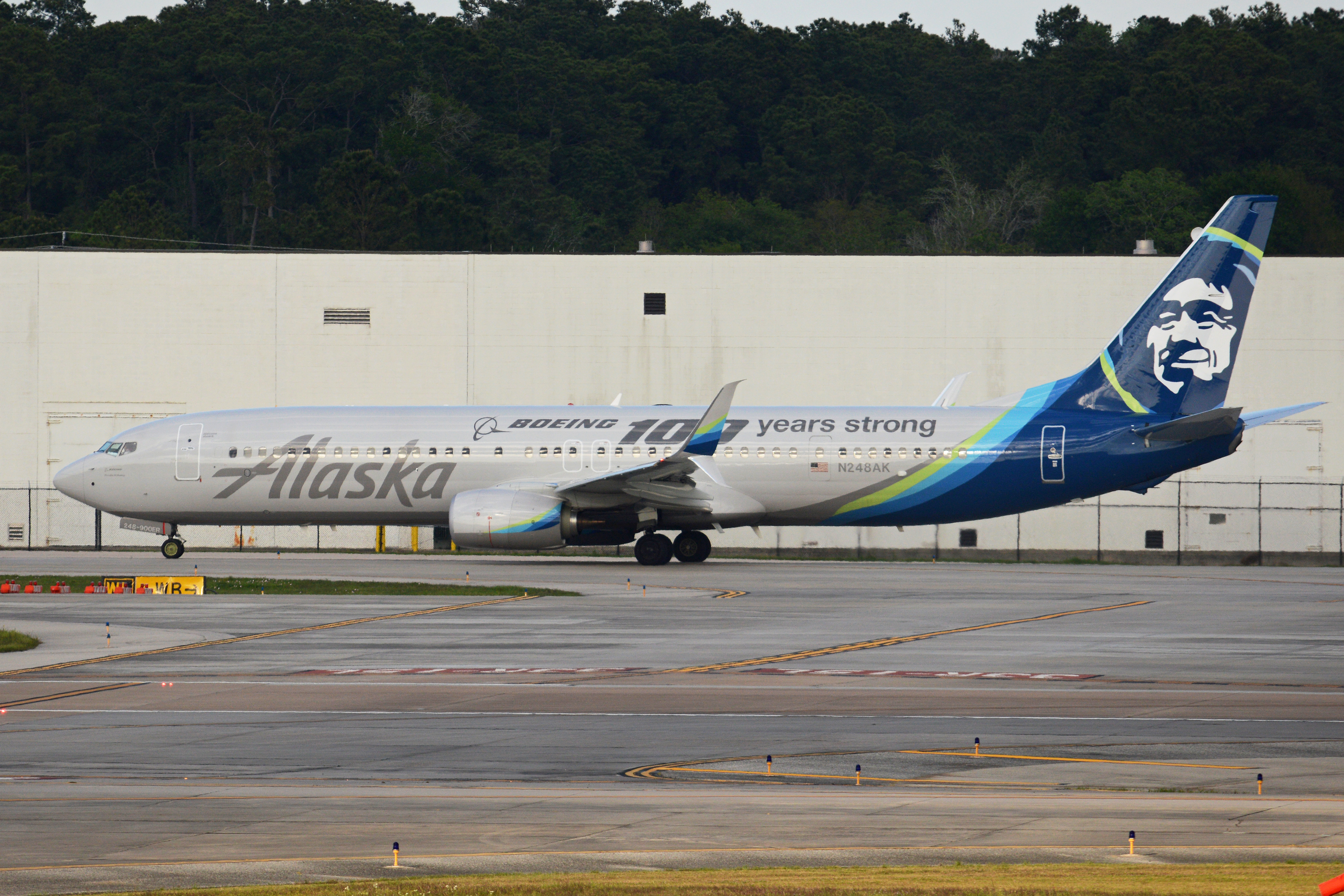
Alaska Airlines commemorated its relationship with Boeing in 2016, with a livery on a 737-900ER aircraft celebrating the plane maker's 100th anniversary.

As of June 2026, the Alaska Airlines fleet consists of 351 aircraft. The fleet includes Boeing 737 and Boeing 787 mainline passenger aircraft, Boeing 737 freighter aircraft, and a regional fleet of Alaska-branded Embraer 175 jets operated by the wholly owned subsidiary Horizon Air and third-party contractor SkyWest Airlines.

Alaska Airlines advertises its relationship with Boeing Commercial Airplanes. All aircraft in the mainline fleet have the Boeing logo and "Proudly Boeing" under the cockpit windows. Alaska operates an aircraft in a special livery celebrating the plane manufacturer's centennial.

== Services ==
=== Cabin ===
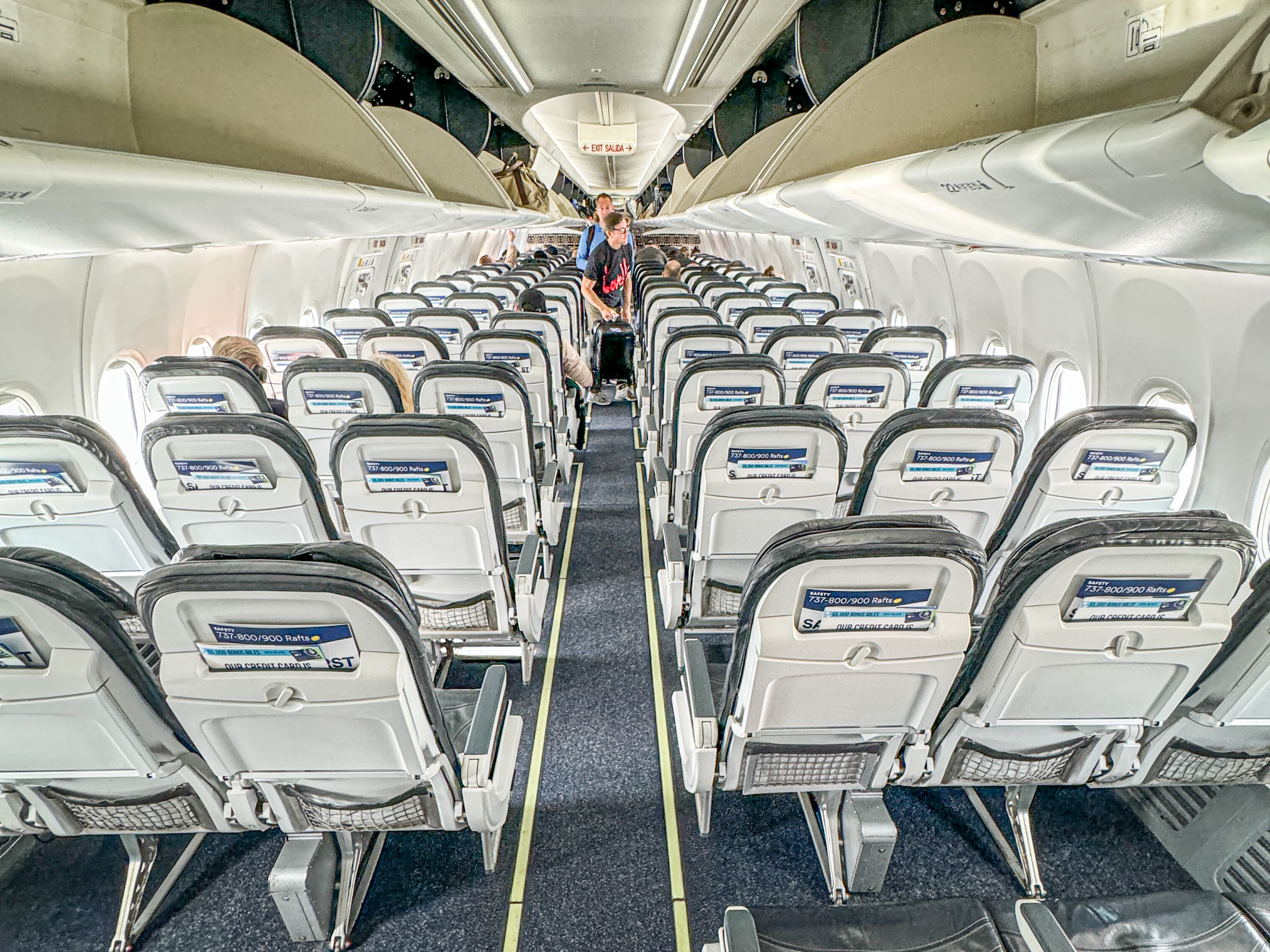
Economy class seats inside a Boeing 737-900ER

First Class features priority boarding, complimentary food, as well as alcoholic and non-alcoholic beverages. Seating is wider recliner style seats in a 2-2 configuration on mainline aircraft and a 2-1 configuration on regional jets. All seats in First Class have power outlets.

Premium Class is located behind First Class and features 35 inches (890 mm) of seat pitch, four inches (100 mm) more than in Alaska's Main Cabin. Passengers receive priority boarding and complimentary alcoholic or non-alcoholic beverages. A small snack is included and food can be purchased. Premium Class seating can be purchased during booking or given through complimentary upgrades for elite fliers in Alaska's Atmos Rewards loyalty program. On mainline aircraft, all seats in Premium Class have USB and power outlets.

Main Cabin is Alaska's economy class. Main Cabin passengers receive a complimentary non-alcoholic beverage and a small snack. Food and alcoholic beverages are available for purchase. On mainline aircraft, all Main Cabin seats have USB and power outlets.

=== In-flight services ===
==== Meals and beverages ====
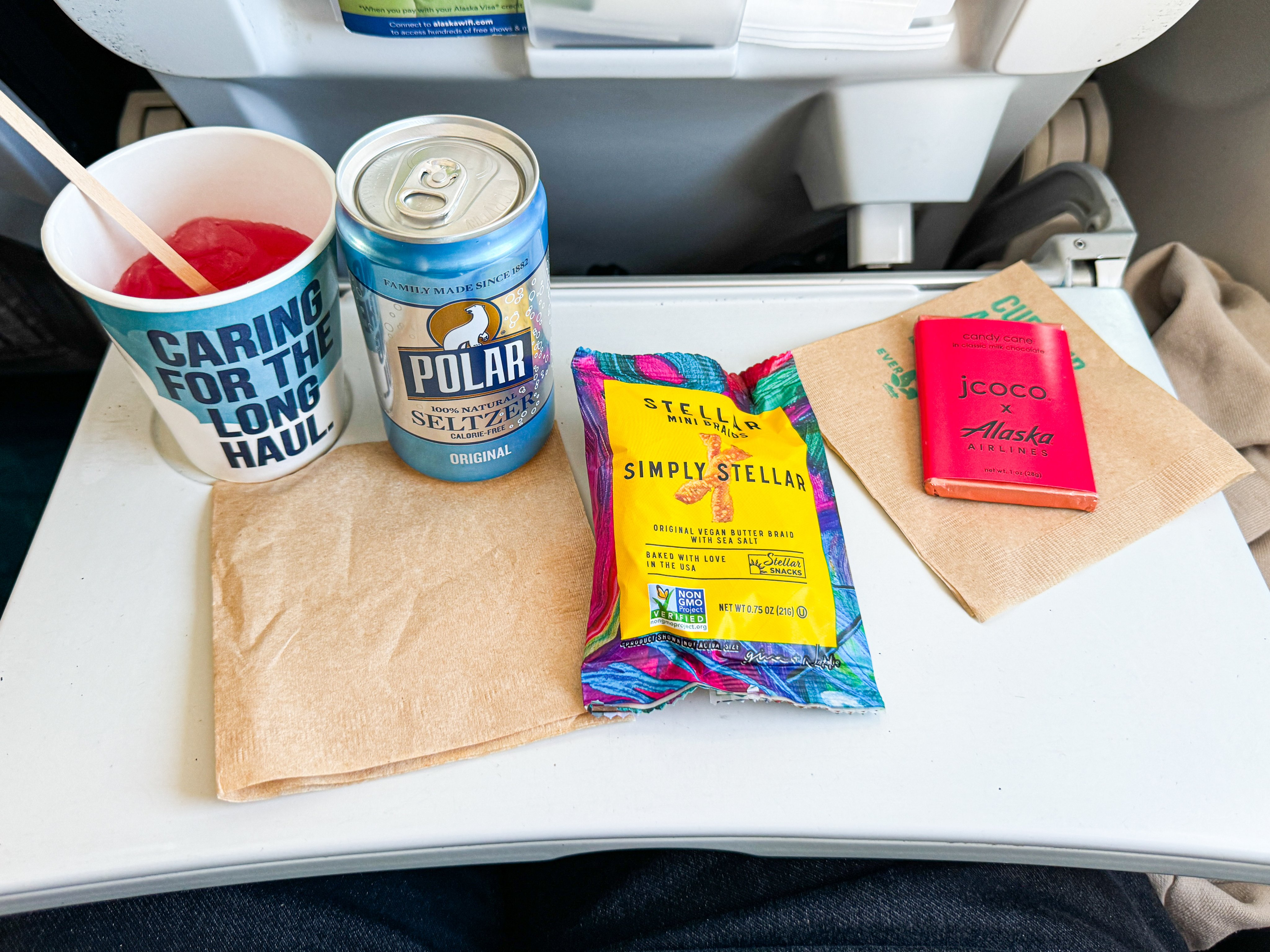
In-flight snack

In 2006, the airline launched its buy on board meal program, on most flights over 2 ½ hours. As part of the program, the airline offers various "Picnic Packs" for a charge in Premium Class and Main Cabin. Picnic packs feature products from West Coast companies including Beecher's Cheese, Tillamook Cheese, Tim's Cascade potato chips and Alaskan Amber beer.

In February 2012, Alaska Airlines started serving coffee from fellow Seattle company Starbucks on all of its flights. Previously Starbucks coffee was only offered on Horizon Air flights. Horizon Air had offered Starbucks coffee since February 1990 and was the first airline in the world to serve Starbucks coffee onboard its flights. In 2023, Alaska changed to serving coffee from Portland-based Stumptown Coffee Roasters.

In July 2018, Alaska Airlines updated much of the First Class menu inspired by the airlines' West Coast presence. New items served included Oregon's Salt and Straw Caramel Ribbon Ice Cream, brownies from Los Angeles-based Sweet Lady Jane, and pasta from Cucina Fresca, based in Seattle. New features included ordering food before flights to allow for meals ready upon seating.

==== In-flight internet access ====
All Alaska Airlines jets are equipped with an in-flight Wi-Fi and streaming entertainment system. It had been announced that soon internet access service will move to a flat $8 charge per flight, but that change only applies to the satellite WiFi-based aircraft. On the older systems, internet service is still fee-based for all passengers, depending on the length of the flight. Streaming entertainment and electronic messaging services are free.

Alaska launched trials of In-flight Wi-Fi Internet service in 2009. The airline tested both the Row44 satellite-based system, before picking the land-based Gogo Inflight Internet system in February 2010. In October 2010, flights between Anchorage and Fairbanks were the first to receive in-flight internet service. In the following months, the system was expanded to cover all routes, except for Hawaii. Alaska Airlines began switching to a satellite-based system in the third quarter of 2019, which is available on all flights, including flights over the Atlantic and Pacific oceans. As of February 2020, 126 of 241 aircraft have satellite WiFi installed.

In August 2025, Alaska Airlines announced the launch of Starlink WiFi onboard all aircraft by 2027. As of late July 2026, approximately 142 aircraft across the Alaska Airlines and Hawaiian Airlines fleets had Starlink WiFi installed.

== Reward programs ==
=== Atmos Rewards ===
The frequent-flyer program of Alaska Airlines and its subsidiary Horizon Air is called Atmos Rewards, formerly known as Mileage Plan. The program's airline partners include members of all three major airline alliances (Oneworld, SkyTeam, and Star Alliance), as well as several unaffiliated carriers. The Atmos Rewards program has no membership fee and allows one-way redemption. Accumulated miles do not expire. The program has elite tiers (Silver, Gold, Platinum, and Titanium) for frequent travelers, who are provided with increased travel benefits.

=== Club 49 ===
In November 2011, Alaska Airlines began a new program, called Club 49, exclusively for Mileage Plan members who are residents of Alaska. Benefits include free checked bags and email notifications about fare sales and discounts. The program has no joining fee and memberships are valid for a year after joining before they need to be renewed.

=== Alaska Lounge ===
The airline operates seven Alaska Lounges. Seattle–Tacoma International Airport, Alaska's largest hub, has three. Portland International Airport, Ted Stevens Anchorage International Airport, San Francisco International Airport, and Los Angeles International Airport have one each.

== Corporate affairs ==
=== Alaska Air Cargo ===
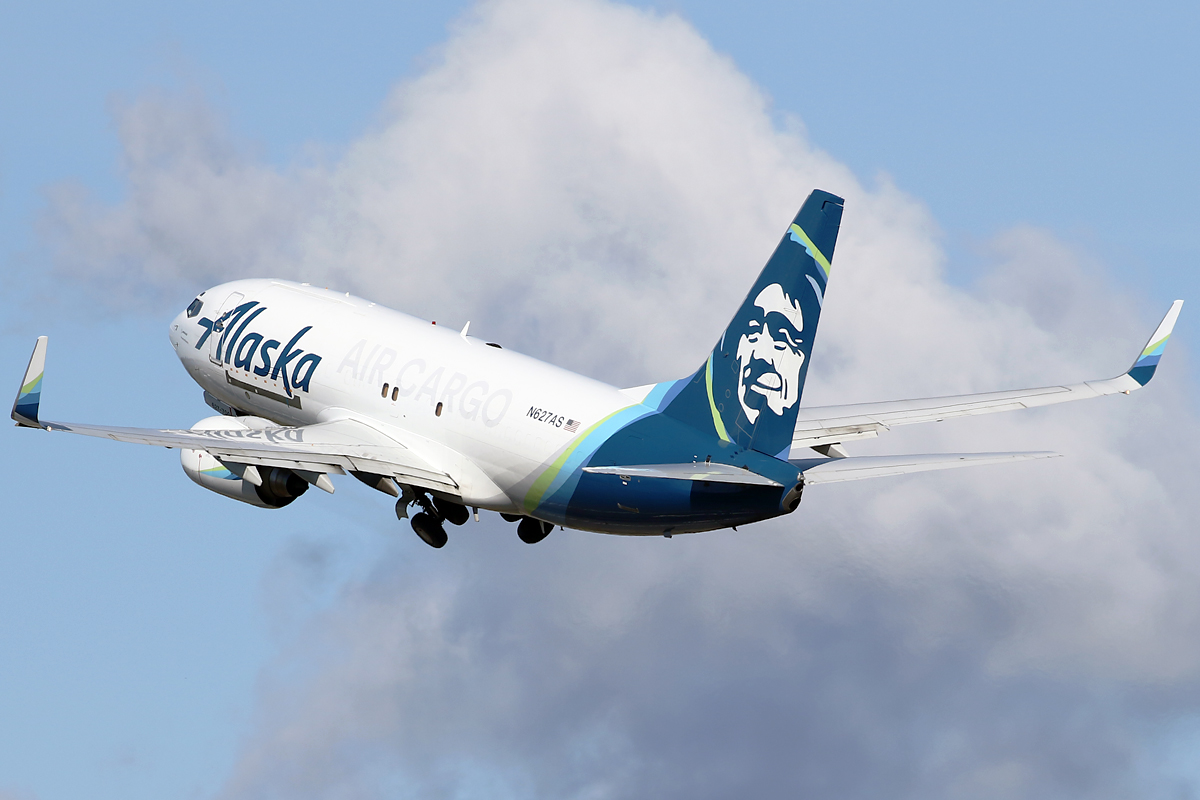
An Alaska Air Cargo 737-700F freighter

Alaska Air Cargo has regional operations in parts of the United States. It has the most extensive air cargo operations on the west coast of the U.S., larger than any other passenger airline. Alaska's cargo operations are focused primarily on the northwestern contiguous states and Alaska, between Anchorage and Seattle. South of Alaska, primary cargo includes fresh Alaskan seafood. Cargo carried north from Seattle is primarily U.S. Postal Service mail. The airline carries goods for remote Alaskan communities and personal packages.

=== Worker relations ===
Alaska's pilot group is represented by the Air Line Pilots Association, International. Its flight attendants are represented by the Association of Flight Attendants.

Since May 2005, the airline's baggage-handling operations have been outsourced to Menzies Aviation. This was in response to the rejection of a contract between IAM, the union which represented the baggage handlers, and Alaska Airlines. It saved the airline an estimated $13 million a year. In late 2016, Alaska Airlines created a wholly owned subsidiary McGee Air Services, which competed with Menzies Aviation for ground handling contracts in select Alaska cities.

== Accidents and incidents ==
Alaska Airlines has had 12 major aviation accidents in its history, nine of which resulted in deaths, with the other three resulting in the aircraft being written off but no deaths. A total of 226 passengers and crew along with two people on the ground have been killed.

- On November 30, 1947, Flight 009, a Douglas C-54A (NC91009), with routing Anchorage–Yakutat–Port Hardy–Seattle, crash-landed while attempting to make an Instrument Landing System (ILS) approach at Seattle–Tacoma International Airport in Seattle. The plane went off the runway, rolled down an embankment, struck a ditch, and continued into the intersection of the Des Moines Highway and South 188th Street where it struck an automobile, caught fire and spilled fuel over the area. Of the 28 occupants, eight died, plus the driver of the car. The crash was attributed to pilot error.
- On January 20, 1949, Flight 8, a Douglas C-47A (NC91006), was on routing Homer–Kenai, when the plane struck the side of Ptarmigan Head 9 miles (14 km) east of the center of the airway to Kenai. Of the six occupants on board, five died. The cause was determined to be the pilot straying off the designated airway.
- On January 26, 1949, an Alaska Airlines Curtiss C-46 (N1241N) crashed at Asmara, then in the Ethiopian Empire (now in Eritrea), attempting to return to the field after losing an engine on takeoff. The aircraft was a write off, but there were only minor injuries among the four crew.
- On August 8, 1954, an Alaska Airlines C-47A (N91008) operating the routing of McGrath, Alaska to Colorado Creek, Alaska, crashed into the side of a mountain about 25 miles (40 km) northwest of McGrath. Both pilots died.
- On March 2, 1957, Flight 100, a Douglas C-54B (N90449) on the routing of Seattle–Fairbanks–Seattle hit a mountain 3.8 miles (6.1 km) from Blyn while on approach to Seattle. All five occupants died. The cause of the crash was the pilot's decision to enter an area of low overcast in mountainous terrain, as well as a navigation error.
- On July 21, 1961, Flight 779, a Douglas DC-6A (N6118C) operating Seattle-–Shemya crashed short of the runway, killing the six crew. The cause of the crash was that the power to the runway and approach lighting systems had been cut off two days earlier, and the control tower neglected to inform the pilots this as they made their approach in the dark.
- On April 17, 1967, An Alaska Airlines Lockheed L-1049H (N7777C) with 28 passengers and four crew members aboard landed with the landing gear retracted during heavy snowfall at Kotzebue Airport. Everyone on board survived but the aircraft was damaged beyond repair.
- On September 4, 1971, Flight 1866, a Boeing 727-193 operating Anchorage–Cordova–Yakutat–Juneau–Sitka crashed into a mountain in the Chilkat Mountain Range about 18.5 miles (29.8 km) from the airport while on approach to Juneau. All seven crew members and 104 passengers were killed. The cause of the crash was determined to be misleading navigational information given to the flight crew, the failure of the crew to use all navigational aids and not performing the required audio identification of the navigational facilities.
- On April 5, 1976, Flight 60, a Boeing 727-81 (N124AS) operating Juneau–Ketchikan overran the runway while landing in Ketchikan after the captain decided to attempt a go-around at the last moment. One passenger died in the accident. The cause of the crash was determined to be pilot error for initiating a go-around after commitment to landing and the pilot's "unprofessional decision" to abandon the precision approach.
- On June 9, 1987, an Alaska Airlines Boeing 727-90C (N766AS) at Anchorage International Airport with two people on board struck a jetway while taxiing and caught fire, destroying the aircraft. The avionics technician inadvertently deactivated the brake pressurization system.
- On March 13, 1990, an Alaska Airlines Boeing 727 taking off from Phoenix Sky Harbor International Airport struck and killed a man who ran onto the runway. There were no injuries on the 727. Airport authorities determined that the man was a patient at a nearby mental hospital.
- On January 31, 2000, Flight 261, a McDonnell Douglas MD-83 (N963AS), crashed into the Pacific Ocean near Anacapa Island, while preparing to attempt an emergency landing at Los Angeles International Airport en route from Puerto Vallarta, Mexico, to San Francisco and Seattle, killing all 88 people on board. An investigation determined the cause of the accident to be the failure of acme nut threads, which were part of the jackscrew assembly for the horizontal stabilizer's trim system.
- On December 26, 2005, Alaska Airlines Flight 536, a McDonnell Douglas MD-83, suffered a rapid depressurization at around 26,000 feet (7,900 m). The aircraft returned to Sea-Tac Airport, with all 147 occupants uninjured. An investigation found that a tug had inadvertently damaged the aft pressure bulkhead which then decompressed while flying to cruising altitude.
- On August 20, 2023, Flight 1288, a Boeing 737-800 (N516AS), suffered a trunion pin failure caused by a defect at the landing gear manufacturer at John Wayne Airport causing the left main landing gear to puncture the left wing of the aircraft; remnants of Hurricane Hilary were moving through the area at the time.
- On January 5, 2024, Flight 1282, a Boeing 737 MAX 9 (N704AL) experienced a rapid decompression when its plugged exit door separated from the airframe shortly after departure from Portland International Airport on its way to Ontario International Airport while climbing through 16,000 feet (4,900 metres). The flight diverted back to Portland. There were no fatalities, but minor injuries were reported. The airplane's manufacturer (Boeing) took responsibility for the incident and as of January 12, 2024, the investigation is still ongoing.

=== Employee incidents ===
- On September 2, 2019, an Alaska Airlines flight attendant called for an evacuation of Terminal A of the Newark Liberty International Airport, causing panic among Labor Day travelers. The flight attendant was subsequently detained by police who determined that the incident was a false alarm; the employee reportedly suffered from a mental health-related issue at the time.
- On October 22, 2023, an Alaska Airlines off-duty pilot, Joseph Emerson, reportedly attempted to shut down the engines of Alaska Airlines Flight 2059 operated by Horizon Air before being subdued by crew members. The aircraft made an emergency landing at Portland International Airport and landed safely. The off-duty pilot was charged with 83 counts of attempted murder. Passengers from the flight initiated a class action lawsuit against Alaska Airlines and Horizon Air, alleging emotional distress from the incident. The plaintiffs sought a thorough explanation and improved pre-flight screenings to prevent similar occurrences, emphasizing the need for vigilance regarding airline staff's mental health. Alaska Airlines recognized the lawsuit and commended the crew for their actions during the emergency.

== Bibliography ==
- Satterfield, Archie (1981). The Alaska Airlines Story. Anchorage: Alaska Northwest Publishing Co. ISBN 9780882401652.

== See also ==
- List of airlines of Alaska
- Air transportation in the United States
