= Jet America Airlines =

Domestic airline of the United States (1981–1987)

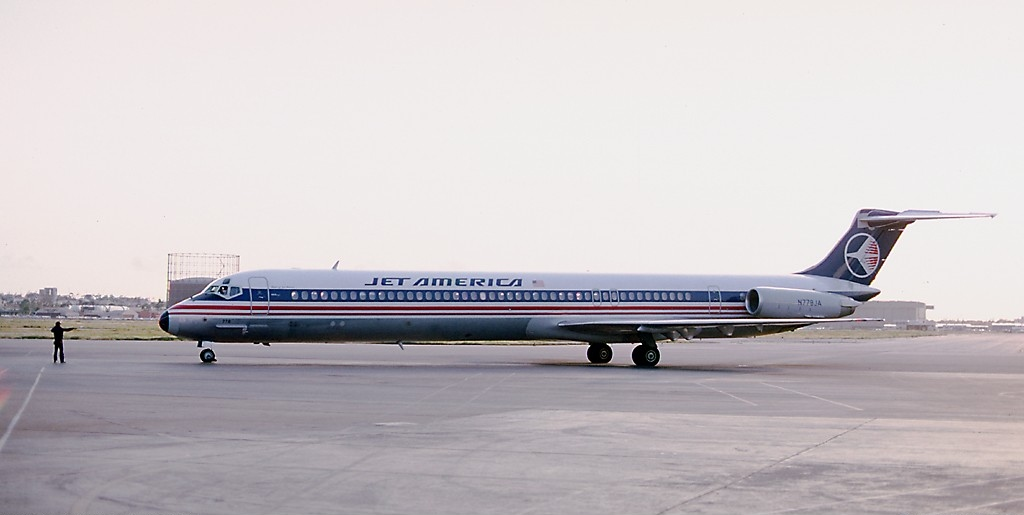
- Jet America MD-82 at Long Beach Airport
IATA	ICAO	Call sign
SI	JET	JET AMERICA
- Founded: 11 September 1980; 46 years ago
- Commenced operations: 16 November 1981; 45 years ago
- Ceased operations: 1 October 1987; 39 years ago (merged into Alaska Airlines)
- Hubs: Long Beach
- Focus cities: Las Vegas
- Frequent-flyer program: Yes; later merged into Gold Coast Travel
- Fleet size: 8
- Destinations: 11
- Parent company: Alaska Air Group
- Headquarters: Signal Hill, California, United States
- Key people: J. Thomas Talbot; Alan H. Kenison; Ted Shown; George Chelius; Don Rhoads; Tim Collins

Jet America Airlines was a United States domestic airline that operated from 1981 to 1987 when it merged with Alaska Airlines after briefly operating as a separate carrier within Alaska Air Group. It was headquartered in Signal Hill, California, near Long Beach.

== History ==
The founding group was headed by executives largely from Air California. The Civil Aeronautics Board issued a final order finding Jet America "fit, willing and able" on June 18, 1981 and the airline began operating on November 16, 1981, with a flight from its home base at Long Beach Airport (LGB) to Chicago O'Hare International Airport (ORD). By July 1984 the airline had expanded service to Dallas/Fort Worth, St. Louis, and Oakland, and had launched its own frequent flyer program. Its fleet consisted of six McDonnell Douglas MD-82 aircraft, with a further four on order; a Boeing 707 was also leased in June 1984 for charter operations, which rapidly incurred significant losses and resulted in the early termination of the lease in January 1985.

Services to Detroit, Las Vegas, and Orange County, California were inaugurated in 1985. During that year, Jet America joined with Disney to advertise a direct route from Dallas/Fort Worth International Airport (DFW) to Long Beach Airport for people to visit Disneyland in its 30th anniversary year. Many of these ads were played during Texas Rangers baseball games or were placed in the team's programs and calendar.

In the summer of 1986, Jet America was operating a small hub at the Las Vegas McCarran International Airport (LAS) with nonstop jet service to Burbank (BUR), Chicago (ORD), Dallas/Ft. Worth (DFW), Long Beach (LGB), Milwaukee (MKE), Ontario (ONT), Orange County (SNA) and St. Louis (STL) as well as direct one stop flights to Detroit (DTW) and Washington, D.C. (DCA).

Jet America Financial Results, 1981 thru 1986
(USD 000)	1981	1982	1983	1984	1985	1986
Op revenue	1,957	29,898	60,083	90,224	101,977	91,026
Op profit (loss)	(2,546)	(8,277)	3,870	3,016	1,990	(1,628)
Net profit (loss)	(3,243)	(8,842)	7,973	(3,676)	(8,541)	(15,810)
Op margin	-130.1%	-27.7%	6.4%	3.3%	2.0%	-1.8%
Net margin	-165.7%	-29.6%	13.3%	-4.1%	-8.4%	-17.4%

In the spring of 1987, as part of Alaska Air Group, the airline was operating direct flights between the west coast and the east coast of the U.S. including a round trip multi-stop flight with a routing of Orange County (SNA) - Portland (PDX) - Seattle (SEA) - Minneapolis/St. Paul (MSP) - Washington, D.C. (DCA) as well as a Long Beach (LGB) - Chicago (ORD) - Washington, D.C. (DCA) round trip flight.

Late in 1986, the airline received buyout offers from Delta Air Lines and Alaska Air Group. The main interest of the carriers were Jet America's landing slots at Washington National, Chicago O'Hare, John Wayne Airport and Long Beach airports. Given Jet America's financial losses and its ever-changing route network, there was little franchise value. The airline accepted the Alaska bid and by the end of the year the acquisition had been completed. After initially attempting to operate the two airlines separately but finding its strategy for Jet America unprofitable, Jet America was merged into Alaska Airlines in October 1987. Alaska Air Group cited a $9 million loss for Jet America in the first nine months of 1987 prior to merging Jet America into Alaska Airlines. Alaska sold Jet America's 14 slots at Chicago O'Hare Airport and four slots at Washington National Airport to United Airlines in exchange for cash and certain west coast facilities. Alaska received praise from industry observers for bringing the "ill-fated" Jet America experiment to a quick end.

== Destinations in 1987 ==
Jet America served the following domestic destinations as of June 1987.

State	City	Airport	Notes	Refs
District of Columbia	Washington, D.C.	Ronald Reagan Washington National Airport		
California	Burbank	Hollywood Burbank Airport	Terminated	
California	Fresno	Fresno Yosemite International Airport	Terminated	
California	Long Beach	Long Beach Airport	Hub	
California	Oakland	Oakland International Airport	Terminated	
California	Ontario	Ontario International Airport	Terminated	
California	Orange County/Santa Ana	John Wayne Airport		
Illinois	Chicago	O'Hare International Airport		
Michigan	Detroit	Detroit Metropolitan Wayne County Airport		
Minnesota	Minneapolis/Saint Paul	Minneapolis–Saint Paul International Airport		
Missouri	St. Louis	St. Louis Lambert International Airport		
Nevada	Las Vegas	Harry Reid International Airport	Focus city	
Oregon	Portland	Portland International Airport		
Texas	Dallas/Fort Worth	Dallas Fort Worth International Airport		
Washington	Seattle/Tacoma	Seattle–Tacoma International Airport		
Wisconsin	Milwaukee	Milwaukee Mitchell International Airport	Terminated	

== Fleet ==
At the time of its acquisition by Alaska Airlines, the Jet America fleet consisted of the following aircraft:

Jet America Airlines fleet
Aircraft	In service	Orders	Passengers			Notes
Aircraft	In service	Orders	F	Y	Total	Notes
McDonnell Douglas MD-82	8	2	12	135	147	Orders transferred to another Alaska Air Group subsidiary.
Total	8	2				

== Fleet history ==
Jet America Airlines retired fleet
Aircraft	Total	Introduced	Retired	Replacement	Notes
Boeing 707-320C	1	June; 1984	January; 1985	None	Leased for charter operations to Mexico and the Caribbean.

== See also ==
- List of defunct airlines of the United States
