= Ben Minicucci =

American business executive

- Born: April 27, 1966 (age 60); Montreal, Quebec, Canada
- Education: Bachelor of Engineering, Royal Military College of Canada; Master of Engineering, Royal Military College of Canada
- Occupations: President and Chief Executive Officer of Alaska Air Group
- Predecessor: Brad Tilden (2012–2021)
- Board member of: Airlines for America, Washington Roundtable, University of Washington Foster School of Business

Benito Minicucci (born April 27, 1966) is an American business executive. He is the president and chief executive officer of Alaska Air Group, the parent company of Alaska Airlines, Hawaiian Airlines, and Horizon Air.

== Early life and education ==
Minicucci was born in Montreal, Quebec. His parents were from Casacalenda, Campobasso and immigrated to Montreal from Italy in the 1950s. Minicucci received his bachelor's and master's degrees in mechanical engineering from the Royal Military College of Canada. In 2012, he completed the advanced management program at Harvard Business School.

== Career ==
Following graduation from college, Minicucci served 14 years in the Canadian Armed Forces. After, he joined Air Canada where he worked in a variety of roles in technical operations and later as vice president of heavy maintenance.

Minicucci joined Alaska Airlines in 2004, where he first worked as staff vice president of maintenance. He went on to hold roles as executive vice president of Alaska's operations in Seattle and chief operating officer. In 2016, he became president of Alaska Airlines where he led the company's expansion into California and was CEO of Virgin America during Alaska's acquisition of the airline. Afar magazine named Minicucci one of their Global Visionaries in 2019.

On March 31, 2021, Minicucci was elected president and chief executive officer of Alaska Air Group, succeeding Brad Tilden.

== Civic engagement ==
Minicucci is on board of directors for Airlines for America, UNCF Seattle, World Trade Center Seattle, Challenge Seattle, Washington Roundtable, and the University of Washington Foster School of Business Center for Leadership and Strategic Thinking Advisory Board.

== Personal life ==
Minicucci became a U.S. citizen in 2012. He also has a brother Pasquale, (Pat) who had a very successful career in the banking sector in Toronto. He lives in Issaquah, Washington.
