= List of Alaskan aviators =

== B ==
- Harvey W. Barnhill (ca. 1902-ca. late 1950s), one of the founders of Barnhill & McGee Airways
- Lucien Frank Barr (1903-1983), signer of the Alaska Constitution

== C ==
- Pearl Laska Chamberlain (1909-2012), pilot and flight instructor based in Nome
- Marvel Crosson (1904-1929)

== E ==
- Carl Ben Eielson (1897-1929)

== F ==
- Richard Foster (1946-2009), son of Willie Foster, took over the family's air service

== H ==
- Jay Hammond (1922-2005)

== J ==
- Roy F. Jones (1893-1974)

== M ==
- Linious "Mac" McGee (1897-1988), co-founder of Barnhill & McGee Airways, founder of McGee Airways
- Russel Hyde Merrill (1894-1929)

== R ==
- Robert Campbell Reeve (1902-1980)

== S ==
- Woodie Salmon (b. 1952), pilot in the Yukon Flats region, later served in the Alaska House

== W ==
- Noel Wien (1899-1977)
