= History of aviation in Alaska =

Aviation in Alaska is central to the vast, lightly populated state with severe weather issues. The short highway system links a few major population centers; railroads are of even lesser importance. Ocean ports, islands, and river towns are served by ocean-going vessels. Air service makes up the rest. Air service by "bush pilots" to the Interior and western Alaska, as well as the Aleutian Islands, allowed for the influx of settlers, the year-round contact of villages with the state's larger cities and services, mail and supplies, and rapid transportation of people and goods throughout the state.

== Commercial service ==
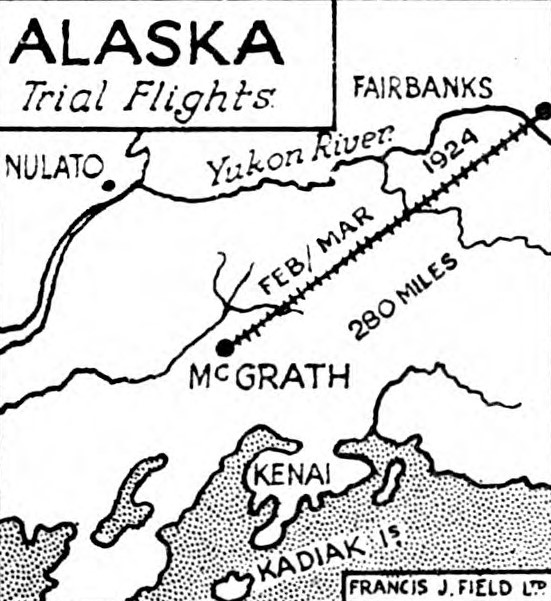
Trial air routes of Alaska in 1925

Commercial service in Alaska began with Wien Air Alaska in 1927. It expanded in the 1930s with Pacific Alaska Airways, Barnhill & McGee Airways, McGee Airways, and Star Air Service, with the latter two eventually becoming the core of Alaska Airlines in 1944. Federal subsidies enable Essential Air Services in Alaska to continue, provided by airlines such as PenAir, Warbelow's Air Ventures, Wings of Alaska, Taquan Air, and Servant Air.

== Notable pilots ==
- Carl Ben Eielson (1897–1929)
- Linious "Mac" McGee (1897–1968)
- Russel Hyde Merrill (1894–1929)
- Ingrid Pedersen, the first woman to fly a small airplane over the North Pole
- Noel Wien (1899–1977)
- Roy S Dickson (1901-1958)

== See also ==
- History of Alaska, History of aviation
- Alaska World War II Army Airfields
- Northwest Staging Route
- List of airlines in Alaska
- List of airports in Alaska, Weeks Field
