= List of airlines of Alaska =

The following is a list of airlines that are based within the U.S. state of Alaska.

== Passenger carriers ==
- Alaska Air Group
  - Alaska Airlines is based in Seattle and owned by the Alaska Air Group out of Washington state, and is the primary operator serving Alaskan communities and connecting Alaska with the rest of the U.S. mainland. It operates scheduled commuter, domestic and international services from its airline hub in Anchorage.
- Alaska Seaplanes operates out of Juneau and Sitka, Alaska, serving island and other isolated communities and villages in Alaska's southeastern region with scheduled commuter and chartered flights.
- Aleutian Airways is a joint venture between Sterling Airways and Alaska Seaplanes which offers scheduled flights between Anchorage and Southwest Alaska.
- Bering Air is headquartered in Nome, Alaska. It operates domestic scheduled passenger and charter services, as well as air ambulance and helicopter services. Its main base is Nome Airport, with hubs at Ralph Wien Memorial Airport in Kotzebue and Unalakleet Airport north of Unalakleet, Alaska. Bering also flies to Anadyr and Provideniya in the Russian Far East.
- Deckload Aviation is based out of Kodiak and offers local charters, commercial services and wildlife viewing.
- Evergreen Helicopters, a part of Evergreen International Airlines, a cargo airline based in McMinnville, Oregon, operates out of Anchorage, where it offers a diversified fleet of heavy lift, medium lift, light helicopters and fixed wing aircraft to provide extensive helicopter services throughout Alaska.
- Grant Aviation is a regional airline that serves the town of Kenai, the Yukon-Kuskokwim Delta, Bristol Bay, and the Aleutian Chain in Alaska.
- Island Air Express is a regional airline that serves Southeast Alaska.
- Island Air Service is based out of Kodiak and provides local wildlife viewing, sightseeing and charter services.
- Seahawk Air is based out of Kodiak and provides local wildlife viewing, sightseeing and charter services.
- Warbelow's Air Ventures operates domestic scheduled passenger, charter, and air ambulance services as well as flight tours. Its base is Fairbanks International Airport.
- Wright Air Service is based in Fairbanks, serving small communities in northern Alaska.
- Yute Commuter Services, passenger carrier part of Flight Alaska that has resumed operations in the Yukon-Kuskokwim delta, based in Bethel

== Cargo service ==
- Alaska Central Express (IATA: KO, ICAO: AER, call sign: Ace Air) is an airline based in Anchorage. It is an Alaskan-owned cargo and small package express service. Its main base is Ted Stevens Anchorage International Airport.
- Aero Tech Inc. Firefighting, charter, survey, cargo, sightseeing, spraying and other aerial services. Based out of Seldovia, Alaska.
- Empire Airlines Scheduled FedEx Cargo Feeder.
- Everts Air Cargo Scheduled and charter freight with hubs at Anchorage and Fairbanks.
- Lynden Air Cargo
- Northern Air Cargo Operates services within Alaska and to Canada and the continental United States. Its main base is Ted Stevens Anchorage International Airport, with a hub at Fairbanks International Airport.
- Ryan Air Services Was known as Arctic Transportation Services from about 1996 to 2010. It also operates scheduled passenger service out of Aniak.

== Defunct airlines ==
- Alaska Coastal Airlines was formed in 1939 as a result of a merger between Alaska Air Transport and Marine Airways. Having absorbed Ellis Air Lines in 1962, Alaska Coastal Airlines was itself taken over by Alaska Airlines in 1968.
- Barnhill & McGee Airways was founded in Anchorage in 1931, one of the earliest air services in Anchorage. While it lasted only a few years, it was the forerunner of McGee Airways, which was a forerunner of Alaska Airlines.
- Cape Smythe Air
- Flight Alaska was an American cargo airline based in Anchorage. Ceased operations in 2017 and assets bought by Ravn Alaska.
- L.A.B. Flying Service was based in Haines, . It operated scheduled, charter and sightseeing flights in Southeast Alaska. Its main base was Haines Airport, with a hub at Juneau International Airport. As of July 2008, L.A.B.'s carrier permit has been subject to an emergency revocation by the FAA.
- MarkAir was a regional airline. It had its headquarters in Anchorage. It ceased operations and liquidated in 1995.
- McGee Airways was founded in Anchorage in 1932. It operated as a bush air service and grew to a fleet of seven black and silver Stinson airplanes. The company was acquired by Star Air Service in late 1934.
- Pacific Alaska Airways was a subsidiary of Pan American World Airways that flew routes around Alaska. The airline was eventually completely absorbed into Pan Am in 1941. The airline restarted service under its own name in the 1970s but ceased operations in 1986.
- Pacific Northern Airlines ("The Alaska Flag Line") was founded in January 1945 as Woodley Airlines, renamed Pacific Northern Airways on August 27, 1945 and Pacific Northern Airlines on August 23, 1947; merged into Western Airlines on October 31, 1967.
- PenAir was based in Anchorage. Assets were acquired by Ravn Alaska, but then sold during Ravn's 2020 bankruptcy.
- Reeve Aleutian Airways was founded in 1946 and flew in parts of Canada and Russia as well as Alaska. They ceased operations in December, 2000.
- Ravn Alaska, formerly Era Alaska, formed by the merger of Era Aviation, Frontier Flying Service, Arctic Circle Air Service, and Hageland Aviation Services. Shut down in 2025.
- Servant Air, regional airline based in Kodiak with revoked carrier certification as of May 2021
- Star Air Service was founded in Anchorage in 1932. Through a long series of acquisitions and mergers became Star Air Lines in 1937, then Alaska Star Airlines in 1942, and finally Alaska Airlines in 1944.
- Wien Air Alaska was formed from Northern Consolidated Airlines and Wien Alaska Airways. The company was famous for being the first airline in Alaska, and one of the first in the United States.
- Rediske Air ceased operations in 2017.
- Wings of Alaska ceased operations in 2017 and merged with several smaller carriers to form Alaska SeaPlanes.

== See also ==
- History of aviation in Alaska
