= Senator Barr =

Senator Barr may refer to:

- Andy Barr (born 1973), U.S. Senator-elect from Kentucky
- Joseph M. Barr (1906–1982), Pennsylvania State Senate
- Lucien Frank Barr (1903–1983), Alaska Territorial Senate
- Richard J. Barr (1865–1951), Illinois State Senate
- Scott Barr (1916–2015), Washington State Senate
- Thomas J. Barr (1812–1881), New York State Senate
