= Pilgrim 100-B N709Y =

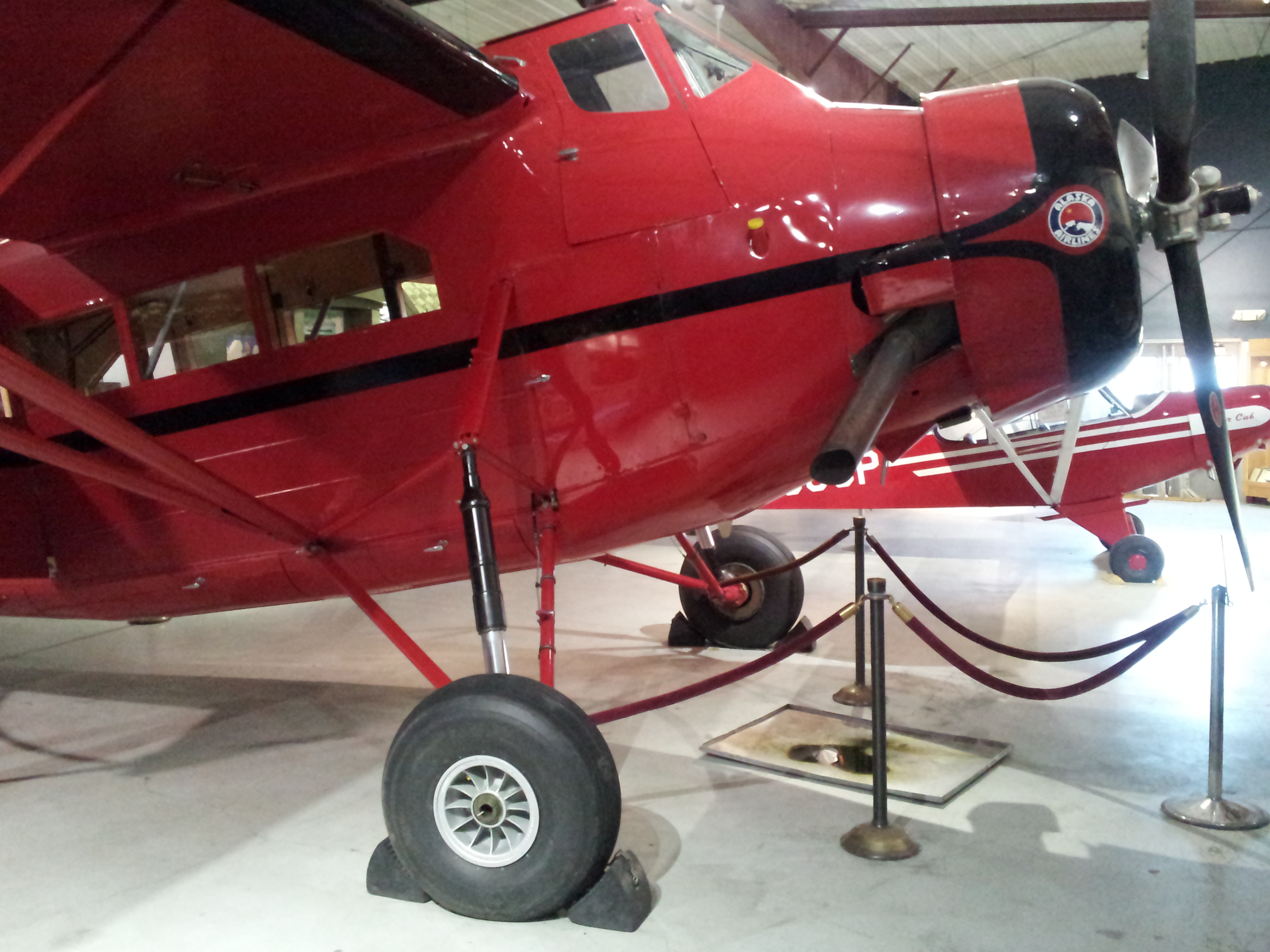
- N709Y on display at the Alaska Aviation Heritage Museum

General information
- Type: Pilgrim 100-B
- Manufacturer: American Airplane & Engine Corp (Fairchild)
- Registration: N709Y

History
- Manufactured: 1932
- Preserved at: Alaska Aviation Heritage Museum, Anchorage, Alaska

- Pilgrim 100B Aircraft
- U.S. National Register of Historic Places
- Alaska Heritage Resources Survey
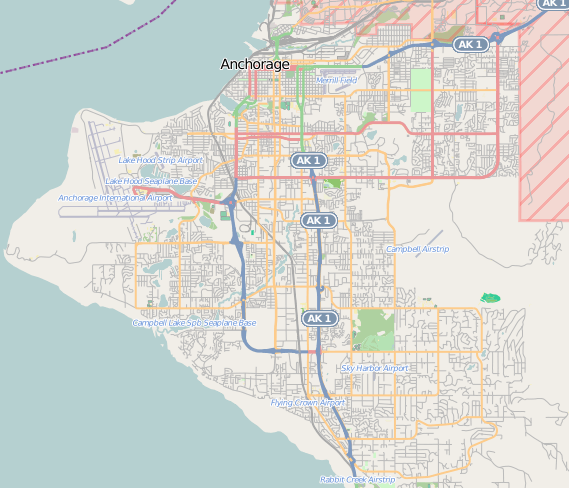
- Location within Anchorage Location within Alaska
- Location: Anchorage, Alaska
- Coordinates: 61°10′45″N 149°58′23″W
- NRHP reference No.: 86002230
- AHRS No.: DIL-035
- Added to NRHP: August 7, 1986

Pilgrim 100-B N709Y is one of a few surviving aircraft from the early days of aviation in the history of Alaska. It is a single-engine aircraft, built as a Fairchild 100 Pilgrim in 1932 by the American Airplane & Engine Corporation, of a type where only 10 were produced. This aircraft, and others like it, were used in the early days of Alaskan aviation to transport mail, people, and supplies, to all corners of the territory. At the time of its listing on the National Register of Historic Places in 1986, it was the last Pilgrim that was still flightworthy and was stationed in Dillingham Airport. It was acquired in 2001 by the Alaska Aviation Heritage Museum, which moved it to its actual location and uses it as a flying exhibit.

== See also ==
- National Register of Historic Places listings in Anchorage, Alaska
