= Alaska Aviation Museum =

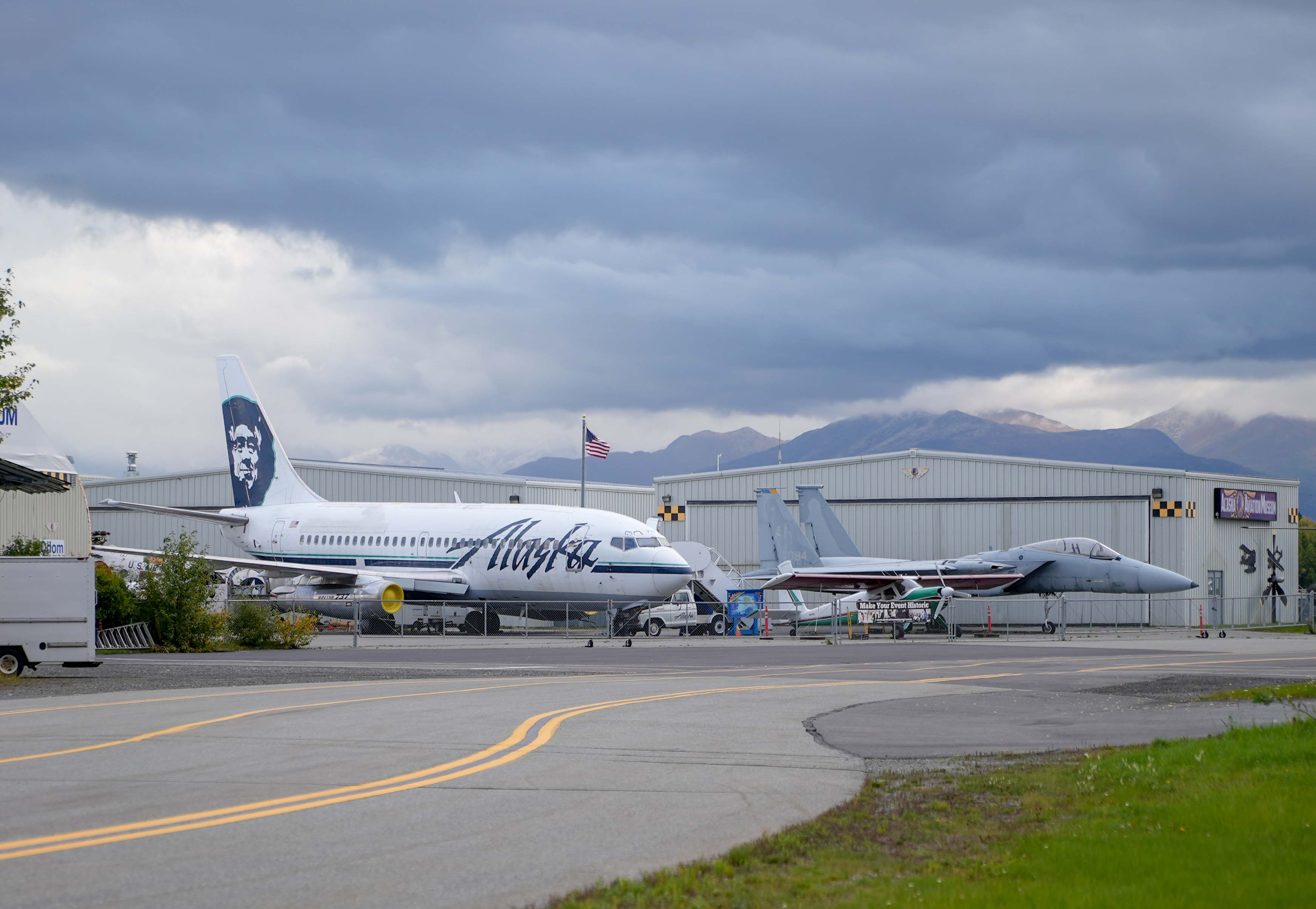
- The museum in Summer 2021

- Location within Alaska
- Former name: Alaska Aviation Heritage Museum
- Established: 1988
- Coordinates: 61°10′40″N 149°58′16″W
- Type: Aviation museum
- Founder: Ted Spencer
- Executive director: Phyllis Kilgore
- Curator: Vacant
- Website: www.alaskaairmuseum.org

The Alaska Aviation Museum, previously the Alaska Aviation Heritage Museum, is located on Lake Hood Seaplane Base in Anchorage, Alaska. Its mission since 1988, is to preserve Alaska's aviation heritage and foster public interest in aviation. It areas of particular focus include bush flying and the World War II Army base on Adak Island.

== History ==
Motivated by the destruction of a collection of historic aircraft in a fire at the then Alaska Transportation Museum four years prior, Ted Spencer founded the Alaska Historical Aircraft Society in 1977. (Note: A separate organization, the United States Historical Aircraft Preservation Museum, was active on the other side of Anchorage at Merrill Field in the early 1980s.) The museum opened to the public in 1988 in the former Alaska Aeronautical Industries building. The following year, it asked the Alaska State Legislature for funding to purchase the leasing rights for the land on which it sat. It soon set about locating aircraft wrecks in remote areas of the state, aiming to recover them before they were acquired by private collectors. (Note: These include a PBY in 1987, a Ford Trimotor in 1989, an LB-30 in 1990, a Bellanca Pacemaker in 1995 and a P-40 in 1999.) With financial assistance from a number of companies and the state legislature, it acquired a Stearman C2B in 1992.

Then, in 1996, it was revealed that the museum was in financial trouble, with visitor numbers decreasing, a number of loans coming due and deferred rent by the Municipality of Anchorage coming to an end. As a result, the museum considered selling some of its aircraft and the mayor, whose audit had discovered the difficulties, proposed moving it to a nearby National Guard Armory. A report that September proposed dissolving the museum's board of directors and that the city take over its operation. A plan by two consultants, released in August 1997, proposed a new board of directors made up of both city and museum personnel. However, two months later, following claims that creditors owed money might seek to seize some of the airplanes, the museum sued the city, arguing that it was unfairly blocking it from selling a Stinson Model A to pay its debts. The museum finally sold the airplane in May 1998 and planned to use a portion of the proceeds to buy its property from the city.

An exhibit about the history of helicopters in Alaska opened in June 2016. The museum unveiled an L-1 restoration project that September.

The museum restored its Grumman Goose to flight in May 2024.

== Facilities ==
The museum is made up of the Main, Rasmuson, South, and Cecil Higgins Restoration Hangars; as well as a shelter. Also on display is the air traffic control tower cab used at Merrill Field from 1962 to 2002.

== Exhibits ==
Exhibits include an art gallery, flight simulator, a display about the 75th anniversary of Alaska Airlines and recreations of a tool shed used by Reeve Aleutian Airways in Valdez, a Quonset hut and storefronts from 4th Avenue in Anchorage.

It is also home to the Alaska Aviation Hall of Fame.

== Collection ==
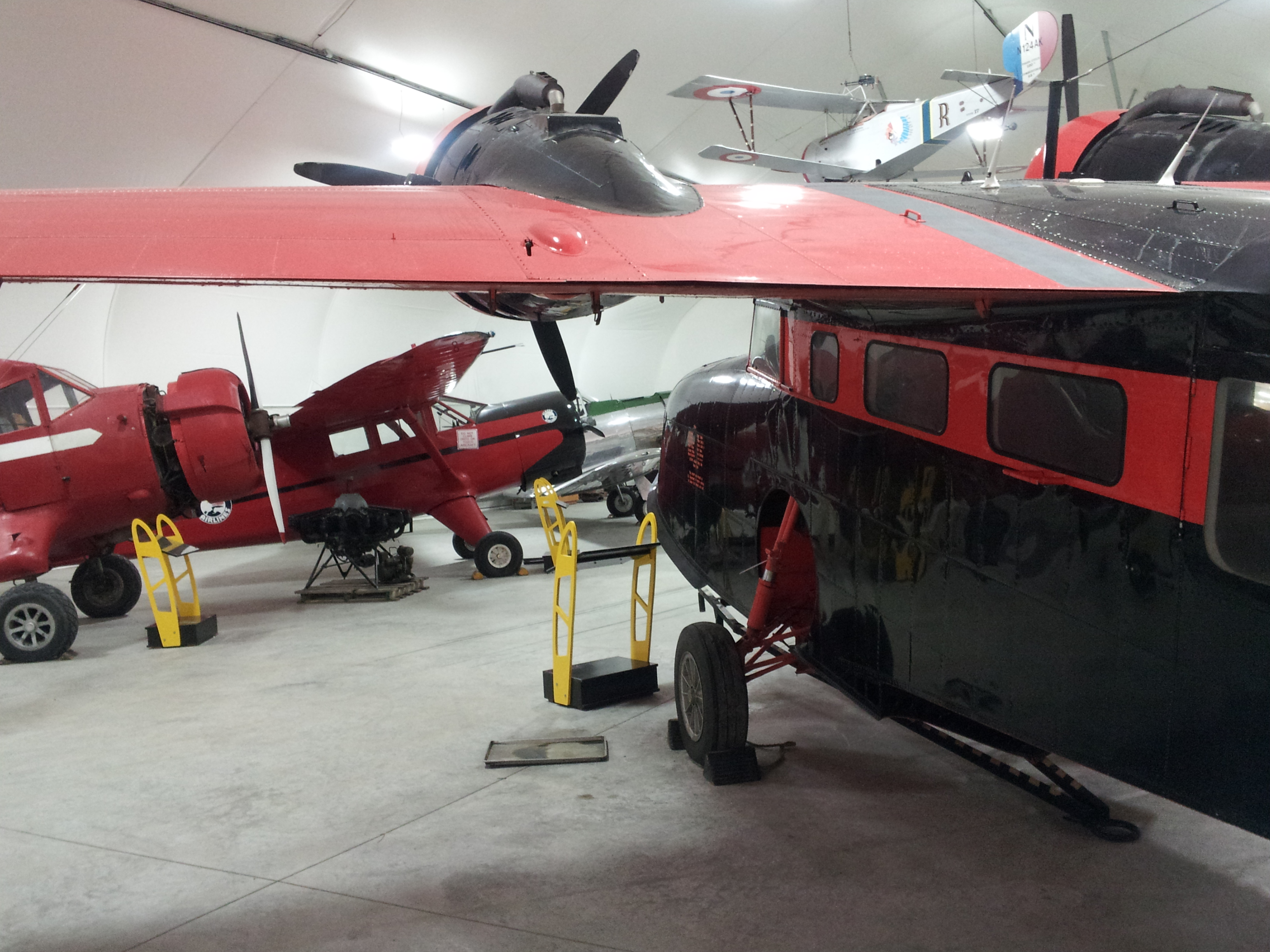
A Grumman Goose

- American Pilgrim 100-B 6605
- Beechcraft Model 18S 7728
- Bell UH-1H Iroquois 65-12849
- Bellanca CH-300 Pacemaker
- Bellanca Senior Pacemaker
- Boeing 737-290C
- Consolidated OA-10A Catalina 44-33954
- Cessna T-50
- Curtiss P-40E Warhawk
- de Havilland Canada DHC-2 Beaver 1207
- Douglas DC-6
- Douglas World Cruiser "Seattle"
- Fairchild 24G 2933
- Fairchild FC-2W2
- Grumman G-21A Goose B-102
- Grumman G-44 Widgeon 1312
- Hamilton H-47
- Helio Courier
- Keystone-Loening Commuter 313
- McDonnell Douglas GF-15A Eagle 74-0084
- Noorduyn Norseman 507
- Piasecki H-21B 54-4004
- Piper PA-18-150 Super Cub 18-4459
- Sikorsky S-43 – forward fuselage only
- Spartan Executive
- Stearman C2B 121
- Stinson L-1 Vigilant 41-18915
- Stinson L-5 Sentinel
- Stinson SR-9
- Stinson V-77 Reliant 77-36
- Taylorcraft BC-12D 7265
- Taylorcraft L-2 5416
- Travel Air S-6000-B 967
- Waco YKC 3991

== See also ==
- History of aviation in Alaska
- List of airlines in Alaska
- List of Alaskan Hall of Fame pilots
