= Northbird =

Mountain summit in Alaska, USA

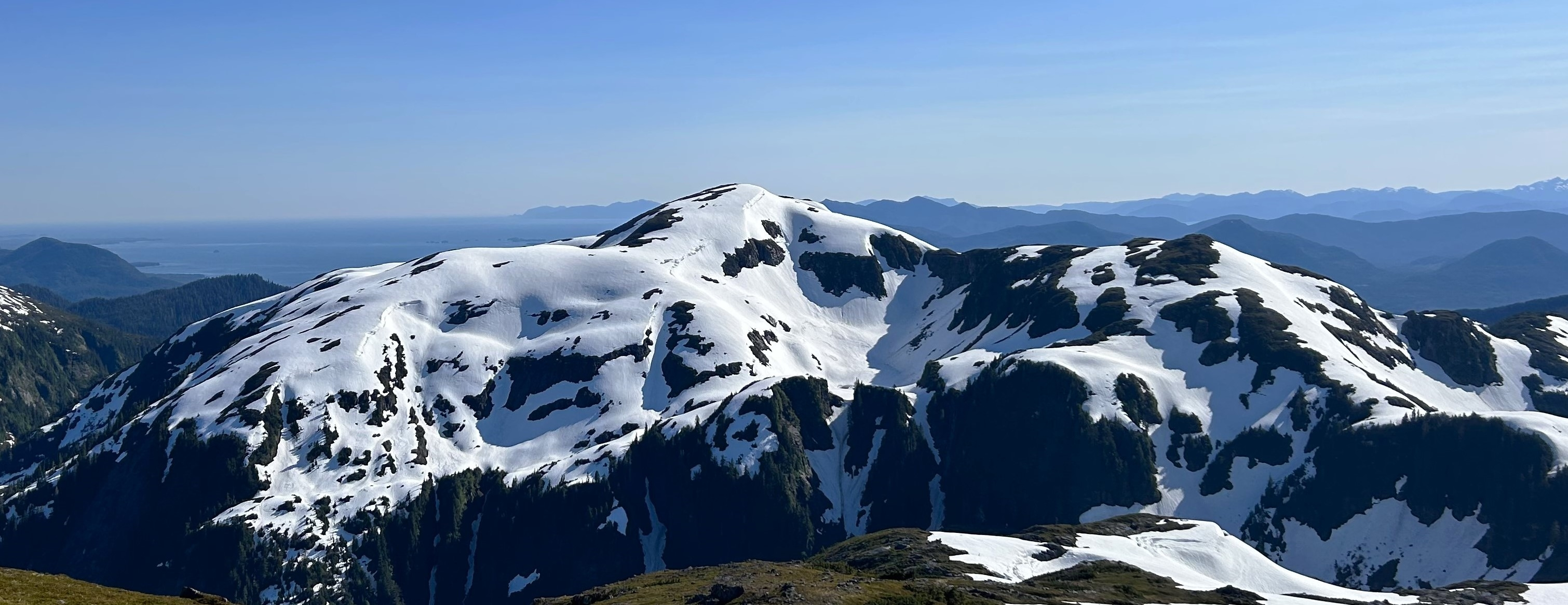
- Northeast aspect

Highest point
- Elevation: 3,310 ft (1,009 m)
- Prominence: 915 ft (279 m)
- Parent peak: Mahoney Mountain (3,382 ft)
- Isolation: 1.88 mi (3.03 km)
- Coordinates: 55°22′24″N 131°33′58″W

Geography
- Location within Alaska
- Interactive map of Northbird
- Country: United States
- State: Alaska
- Borough: Ketchikan Gateway
- Protected area: Tongass National Forest
- Parent range: Pacific Ranges
- Topo map: USGS Ketchikan B-5

Climbing
- Easiest route: Trail

Northbird, also known as Northbird Peak, is a 3,310-foot-elevation (1,009-meter) mountain summit in Alaska, United States.

== Description ==
Northbird is located 3.7 miles (5.9 km) northeast of Ketchikan on Revillagigedo Island, on land managed by Tongass National Forest. Precipitation runoff from the mountain drains east to George Inlet and west to Tongass Narrows. Topographic relief is significant as the summit rises 2,264 feet (690 meters) above Granite Basin in one mile (1.6 km) and 3,310 feet (1,009 meters) above tidewater of George Inlet in 3.5 miles (5.6 km). An ascent of the summit involves hiking along the Deer Mountain National Recreation Trail, passing through temperate rainforests, muskeg and alpine meadows from the trailhead in Ketchikan to the peak.

== Etymology ==
Northbird is situated 0.29 mile northeast of Roy Jones Mountain (3,222 ft), which is named after Roy F. Jones. Jones was the first pilot to establish commercial air service in Alaska in 1922 when he landed his open cockpit biplane named Northbird at Ketchikan in the Tongass Narrows. The Northbird toponym was officially adopted in 1974 by the United States Board on Geographic Names.

== Climate ==
Based on the Köppen climate classification, Northbird is located in an Oceanic climate zone characterized by heavy cloud cover and high humidity through much of the year and abundant rainfall throughout the year (even in the driest month). Weather systems coming off the Gulf of Alaska are forced upwards by the mountains (orographic lift), causing heavy precipitation in the form of rainfall and snowfall. Winter temperatures can drop to 0 °F with wind chill factors below −10 °F.

== See also ==
- Geography of Alaska
- Alexander Archipelago
