= Bellanca CH-200 Pacemaker =

CH-200 Pacemaker
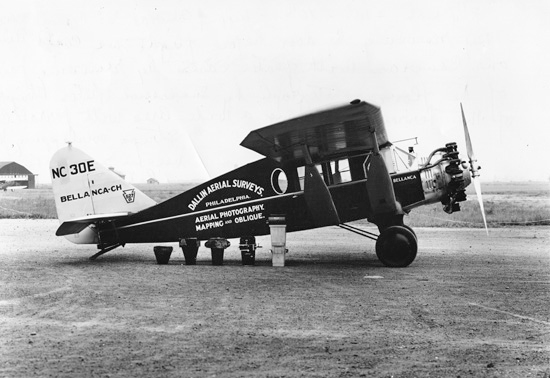

General information
- Type: Civil utility aircraft
- Manufacturer: Bellanca
- Designer: Giuseppe Mario Bellanca

History
- First flight: 1928
- Developed from: Wright-Bellanca WB-2
- Developed into: Bellanca CH-300 Pacemaker

The Bellanca CH-200 Pacemaker was a six-seat, high-wing, single-engine utility aircraft built in the United States in the 1920s. It was a development of the Wright WB-2 that Bellanca had acquired the rights to in 1926 and was the first Bellanca-branded aircraft to gain a type certificate. The CH-200 was used in a number of pioneering long-distance flights and attempts on distance and endurance records.

== Operational history ==
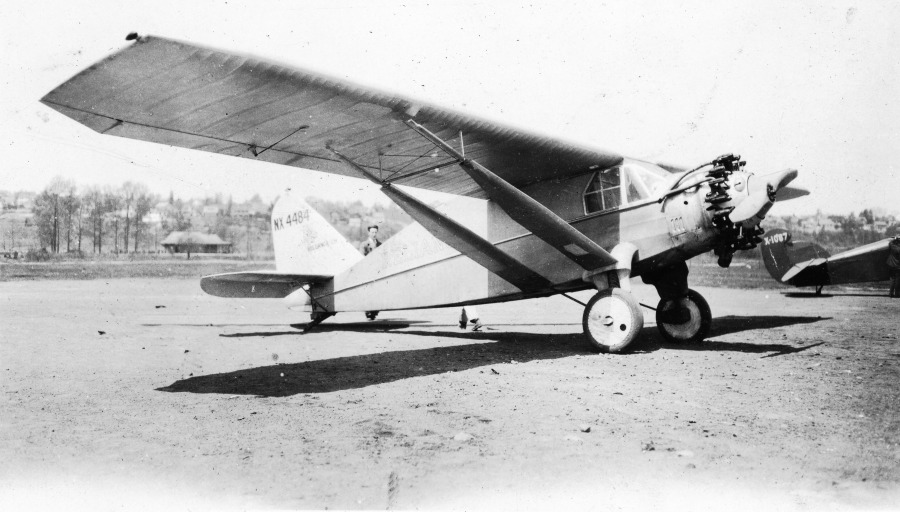
Bellanca CH-200 NX4484 Reliance

At the 1928 Los Angeles Air Races, a CH-200 piloted by J. Victor Dallin took second place in the speed trials (average of 104.65 mph (168.42 km/h)) and won the efficiency trials. The same year, Lt Royal Thomas set a world endurance record of 35 hours 25 minutes in the Reliance (NX4484).

Colonel Hubert Julian set another record in Bellanca J-2 Special NR782W (s/n 1101), a modified CH-200 re-engined with a Packard DR-980 diesel engine in which he stayed aloft for 84 hours and 32 minutes, a record for diesels which has never been broken.

Between 11 December 1928 and 25 June 1929, Peruvian aviators Carlos Martínez de Pinillos and Carlos Zegarra Lanfranco flew a CH-200 named Perú on a tour of Latin America. During that time, they covered 20,635 km (12,822 mi) in 157 hours 55 minutes of total flight, visiting 13 countries and 25 cities.

== Specifications ==
General characteristics

- Crew: one pilot
- Capacity: five passengers
- Length: 27 ft 9 in (8.5 m)
- Wingspan: 46 ft 4 in (14.1 m)
- Powerplant: 1 × Wright J-5 radial , 220 hp (164 kW)

Performance

- Maximum speed: 126 mph (203 km/h, 109 kn)
- Range: 800 mi (1,290 km, 700 nmi)

== See also ==
Related development

- CH-300
- CH-400
