= L.A.B. Flying Service =

L A B Flying Service
IATA	ICAO	Call sign
JF	LAB	LAB
- Founded: 1956; 69 years ago
- Ceased operations: 2008; 17 years ago
- Headquarters: Haines, Alaska, U.S.
- Website: http://www.labflying.com/

L.A.B. Flying Service was an American airline based in Haines, Alaska. It operated scheduled, charter and sightseeing flights in Southeast Alaska. Its main base was Haines Airport, with a hub at Juneau International Airport.

== History ==
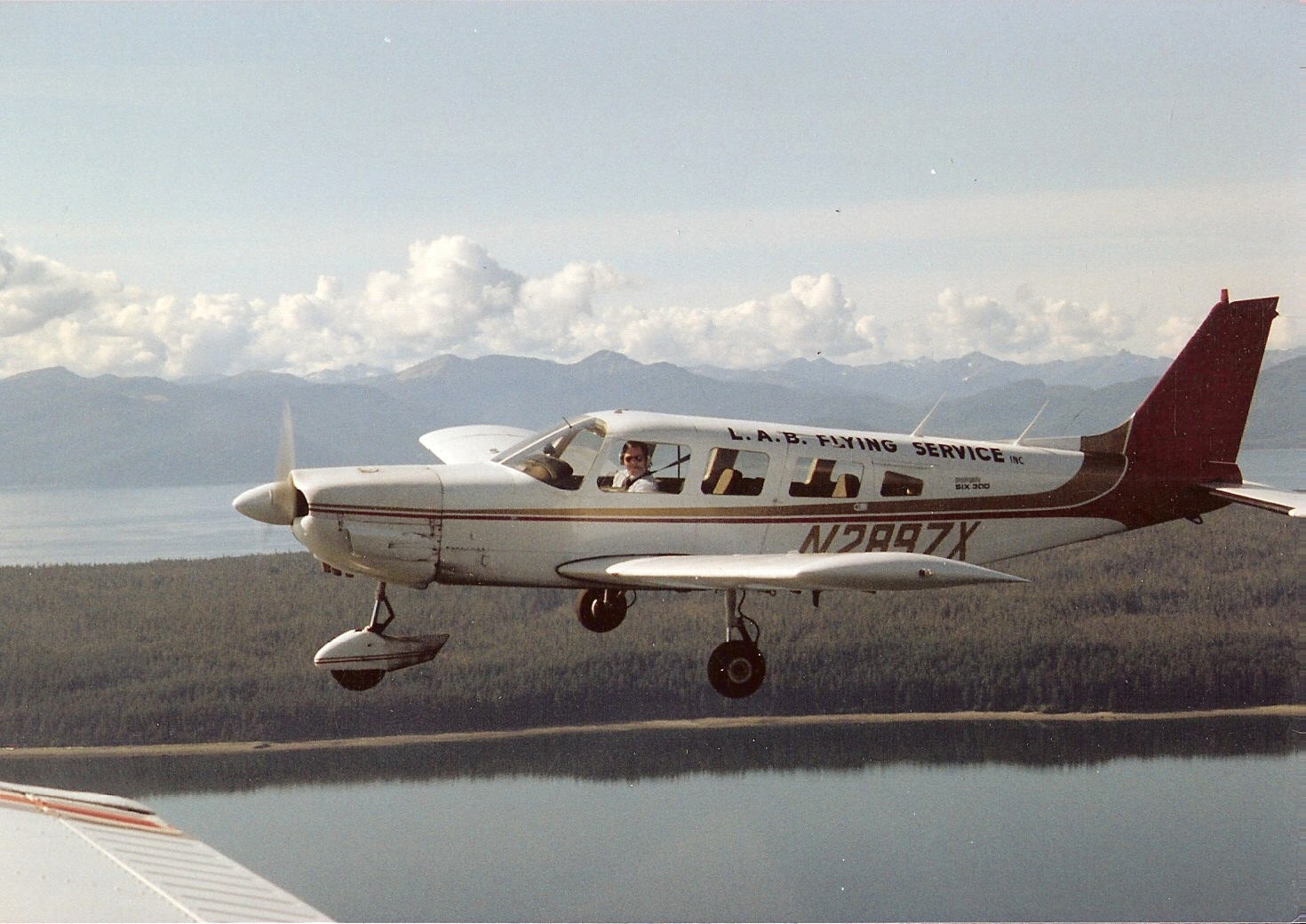
Piper PA-32-300 (N2897X)

The airline was established and started operations in 1956. It had 55 employees as of March 2007. L.A.B. Flying Service, named for its founder (and President), Layton A. Bennett, was Alaska's oldest continuously-operating small passenger airline. Layton A. Bennett received the Federal Aviation Administration's Wright Brothers Master Pilot Award for his work in operating the airline for over 50 years.

== 2008 grounding ==
In July 2008, Alaska Public Media reported that the FAA had grounded LAB's entire fleet, because, in their words, "LAB Flying Service lacks the care, judgment and responsibility required to hold an air carrier certificate." One of the seven counts listed in the grounding order stated that LAB mechanics took an engine off of an airplane that had been destroyed in a fire with temperatures in excess of 2,000 degrees Fahrenheit and re-mounted it on another airplane, intending to put it back into service. LAB's website and email system turned off August 26, 2008.

== See also ==
- List of airlines in Alaska
- List of defunct airlines of the United States
