= Star Air Service =

1932–1944 Alaskan airline

Star Air Service Star Air Lines Alaska Star Airlines
| IATA | ICAO | Call sign |
|---|---|---|
| — | — | ASA (1942–) |
- Founded: April 14, 1932; 94 years ago
- Ceased operations: June 6, 1944; 82 years ago (renamed Alaska Airlines)
- Focus cities: Anchorage, Alaska; Fairbanks, Alaska; Nome, Alaska
- Destinations: Numerous
- Headquarters: Anchorage, Alaska
- Key people: Steven E. "Steve" Mills; John E. "Jack" Waterworth; Charles H. "Charlie" Ruttan; Raymond W. Marshall

Star Air Service, later Star Air Lines and Alaska Star Airlines was an American air service in Alaska from 1932 to 1944. With financial help from a wealthy Alaska miner, three pilots who had started a flying school and charter business in Seattle, shipped an open-cockpit biplane by steamship to Alaska in March 1932. Star Air Service was incorporated in April, 1932 in Anchorage with capitalization of $4,000. The company had some early success training student pilots, but their airplane was destroyed in a crash. Their financial backer helped them purchase a larger plane with an enclosed cabin which supported winter operations.

Three air services were founded in Anchorage in 1932. There was a surplus of airplanes, and not enough business to support them all, which prompted the 1934 merger of McGee Airways with Star Air Service. Star became the largest carrier in Alaska. A lack of financial resources and poor management continued to haunt the company. One of the founders lost his pilot's license and another died in a plane crash in 1936. With a change in management, the company was sold to a new group of investors in 1937, and renamed Star Air Lines.

Government regulation of Alaska airline routes which began in 1938, along with continued financial instability of Alaska's air carriers prompted a consolidation within the industry. In 1942, Star Air Lines was purchased by New York City businessman Raymond Marshall.

The new owners acquired three smaller Alaska carriers, gaining additional scheduled routes to Fairbanks, Nome and the Kuskokwim area. The expanded company was renamed Alaska Star Airlines. In September 1943, after narrowly beating a competitor who was also filing for the name, the company was renamed again, becoming Alaska Airlines, which continues to operate today.

== Company founders ==
Steven E. "Steve" Mills was born in Dayton, Wyoming, in 1896 and moved to Seattle after serving in World War I. He worked as a furnace inspector for the Seattle Gas Company while taking flying lessons at Washington Aircraft Company at Boeing Field. In 1928 he went to work for the firm's flying school and was chief instructor until he went to Alaska in 1932.

John E. "Jack" Waterworth was born in Oelwein, Iowa, reared in Seattle and attended the University of Washington studying to be a pharmacist. With financial help from the industrialist Norton Clapp, Jack took flying lessons from Steve Mills at Washington Aircraft Company. Instead of becoming a pharmacist, Waterworth decided to stay in aviation and he worked as an instructor and charter pilot. He made numerous flights throughout the northwest and an occasional cross-country trip to ferry planes from the east coast to Seattle.

Charles H. "Charlie" Ruttan was a 22-year-old Canadian from Winnipeg, Manitoba, who had moved with his family to Victoria, British Columbia, and took flying lessons from Steve Mills.

Wesley Earl Dunkle was a wealthy Alaska mining engineer with several mining claims, as well as being superintendent of the Lucky Shot Mine in the Chugach Mountains north of Anchorage. Dunkle was interested in aviation and went to Seattle to take flying lessons, where he became friends with Mills and Waterworth. With aviation becoming popular in Alaska, many Alaskans wanted to learn to fly, but could not afford to go to Seattle for lessons. Dunkle encouraged Mills and Waterworth to open a flying school in Anchorage and offered to make them a loan in exchange for free flying lessons when they moved to Alaska.

== History ==
=== Early history in Seattle ===
Mills and Waterworth were anxious to start a flying school and charter business in Seattle with hopes of expanding to Alaska. Mills, who was married and the father of two sons, mortgaged his home, and he and Waterworth purchased a two-place Davis monoplane, and started Northern Air Service. Waterworth completely destroyed the plane in a crash in Centralia, Washington. Their new company was without an airplane, and they needed a new partner to help finance the purchase of another airplane.

Charlie Ruttan was an ideal prospect. He already had his transport pilot's license when the Davis crashed. He joined the company and loaned enough money to purchase a two-place Fleet Deluxe B-5 biplane in Glendale, California, in 1931. By then, it was too late in the year to take the plane to Alaska, so the trio kept working in Seattle through the winter.

=== Early operations in Alaska ===
In the early spring of 1932, they shipped the Fleet biplane to Seward, Alaska, on the SS Yukon steamship, arriving March 26, 1932. They incorporated their new Alaska company Star Air Service in Anchorage on April 14, 1932, with capitalization of $4,000. Mills was chief pilot, Waterworth was an instructor, and Ruttan was business manager. Earl Dunkle along with a small group of miners and local flying enthusiasts made investments.

Star Air Service had a lot of flight instruction business and also did some charter flying. Al Monsen, who flew for Pacific International Airways, the Pan American subsidiary, borrowed the Fleet for a local charter flight. When he returned to Merrill Field, he overshot the runway by a large margin, crashing in willow brush past the field. This put Star Air Service temporarily out of business. With more financial help from Earl Dunkle, they purchased a three-place Curtiss Robin which had an enclosed cockpit, allowing better winter operations.

Three airlines were started in 1932 in Anchorage when it was a small frontier town of about 2,200 residents. They were McGee Airways, Woodley Airways and Star Air Service. These companies helped make Anchorage the major city in Alaska, overtaking Fairbanks in the competition for business, government contracts and international attention. Originally these Anchorage air services were entirely unscheduled "bush" operations. They flew trappers, hunters, tourists, salesmen, sport fishermen, commercial fisherman and game hunters to destinations throughout the Territory. They flew from place to place delivering and picking up passengers and cargo, until getting a charter back to Anchorage. The pilots were often gone for weeks at a time before returning to home base.

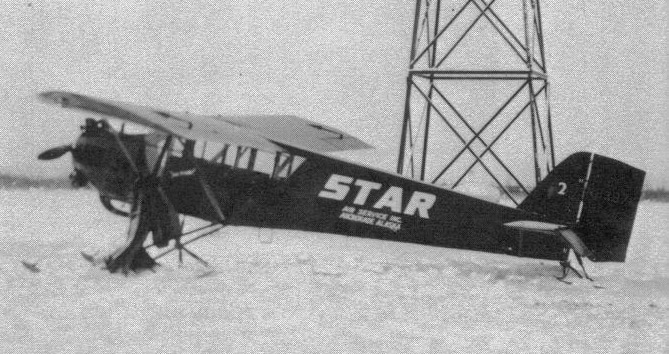
Star Air Service Curtiss Robin.

The pilots were paid on a commission basis, and since the major industries in Alaska were seasonal, they also issued credit. The commercial fishermen, miners and trappers settled their credit accounts at the end of their seasons. When the Post Office Department began giving the air services air mail contracts, the steady income helped the companies, and expanded the flights into additional remote villages. Previously mail had been delivered by steamships in the summer and dog teams in winter. In winter months from October 1 until May 1 only letters, cards, packages of seeds weighing less than a pound, and newspapers going to libraries or newspaper publishers were carried. Packages were held in Seattle until the summer months when they could be delivered by boat.

By 1934, all the airlines were suffering financially. There was a surplus of airplanes and not enough business to allow the companies to accumulate sufficient cash reserves to survive through difficult times.

=== Merger with McGee Airways ===
In the winter of 1934, "Mac" McGee, founder of McGee Airways, was anxious to return to mining the several mines he had staked and felt that a consolidation of air services in Anchorage was necessary. He approached Star Air Service, who purchased McGee Airways for $50,000. McGee stipulated that if he was not paid on time, he would return to manage the combined company until he received his full payment.

The merger made Star Air Service the largest airline in Alaska, but money was not coming in as hoped for, and McGee was called back from his Kobuk mining operation to take over management of the company. He paid himself three percent of gross income until he accumulated all the money due him, then went back to mining. In 1935, Jack Waterworth's pilot's license was suspended for 6 months for flying stunts over Palmer during the fair. He left Star to work at Loussac's Drugstore as a pharmacist, the profession he had studied in college.

In 1936, Star Air Service was operating 15 planes with a gross income of $190,000 per year. By August 1936, McGee had left Star and returned to his mining operations. Kenneth W. "Kenny" Neese, one of the Star pilots, took over management of the company, and Steve Mills was chief pilot. On Sunday August 30, 1936, Mills took a group of two married couples and a single man on an all-day fishing trip to Russian River on the Kenai Peninsula. They crashed on a ridge 2,000 feet above Upper Russian Lake. All were killed instantly. This was the worst aviation disaster in Alaska's history.

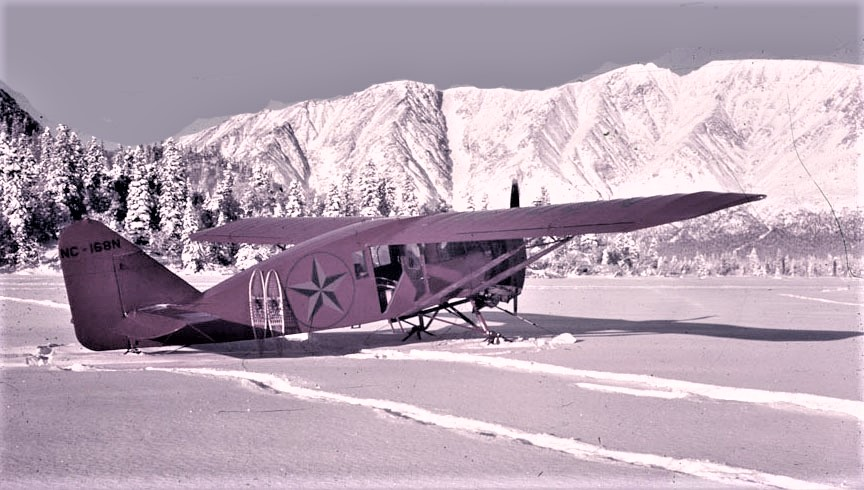
Star Air Lines Bellanca in the snow.

Kenny Neese was attempting to put the air service on a scheduled basis. Don Goodman and Oscar Winchell, two of Star's pilots, did not agree with this strategy, and left Star to purchase airplanes and start Alaska Interior Airlines in November 1936. In the spring of 1937, Neese quit as Star manager and returned to flying. McGee was called back to manage the struggling company for the last time. Charlie Ruttan, the last of the Star founders, left the company. McGee bought Alaska Interior Airlines, adding two pilots and two planes to the fleet, and got the company back into good condition.

Don Goodman approached several miners and businessmen and put together a corporation to buy Star Air Service, renaming it Star Air Lines on November 27, 1937. David Strandberg, a successful miner, and his sons were the major stockholders.

=== Era of government regulation ===
In 1938, the Civil Aeronautics Act was passed, creating the Civil Aeronautics Authority. This ended the free-wheeling bush flying era of Alaska aviation, and assigned specific routes to the air carriers. The new law established a "grandfather clause" which entitled existing carriers to receive certificates for routes where the carrier could prove that it had provided continuous service on a route during the period May 14, 1938 to August 22, 1938. This regulation resulted in the consolidation of several airlines; the big ones got bigger, and the small ones disappeared. Goodman and the Strandbergs determined to make Star Air Lines one of Alaska's major carriers.

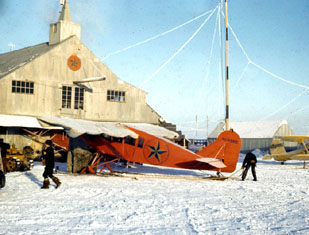
Star Air Lines Bellanca at Merrill Field in Anchorage.

At its peak before World War II, Star Air Lines had a fleet of 15 planes and had radio stations scattered across the Kuskokwim and Yukon deltas and down to Bristol Bay. It was the largest airline in Alaska, but as usual, was chronically short of capital and unable to invest adequately in new equipment.

The Civil Aeronautics Board (CAB) hearings in 1940 increased government control over Alaska's airlines which completely reshaped the industry. Both Star Air Lines and Woodley Airways did everything possible to obtain approval for a route from Alaska to Seattle. The CAB ruled in favor of a Seattle route for Star in March 1941, but President Franklin D. Roosevelt vetoed the ruling. Pan American Airways started a Seattle – Ketchikan – Juneau service with a Sikorsky flying boat in 1940, but the route was discontinued when World War II started.

=== Consolidation and acquisition ===
A color video of the Star Air Line Fleet from 1939.

In 1942, Art Woodley, founder and operator of Woodley Airways in Anchorage, wanted to buy Star Air Lines, and knew he could purchase the company for its debts, about $80,000. Due to the intense rivalries between the companies, he needed to be anonymous in any negotiations. He hired Homer Robinson, a New York attorney experienced in aircraft sales and aviation transactions, as a broker. Robinson was a close associate of Raymond W. Marshall, a wealthy international junk dealer who had made a fortune selling scrapped railroad equipment to South American companies, as well as other ventures. Robinson successfully concluded the negotiations, but then informed Woodley that Raymond Marshall would be the purchaser, not Art Woodley. Marshall was the new owner of the company!

The new owners expanded the company acquiring three active Alaska air services. On May 15, 1942, they acquired Mirow Air Service for $60,000, gaining the Nome to Fairbanks route, and Lavery Air Service for $60,000, gaining the Fairbanks–Anchorage route. On July 6, 1942, they renamed the expanded company Alaska Star Airlines. On December 8, 1942, they acquired Pollack Flying Service for $125,000, gaining the Fairbanks to Kuskokwim area routes. Mirow Air Service was founded by Hans Mirow, a German sailor who learned to fly in the late 1920s at Tex Rankin's Flying School in Portland, Oregon. He went to Alaska in 1934 and started his successful operation in Nome, initiating the first scheduled flights between Nome and Anchorage. Mirow was killed when he crashed while searching for Fred Chambers, one of his pilots who had been forced down between Nome and Fairbanks with passengers. His widow Madeleine Mirow continued to operate the service until selling to Star Air Lines.

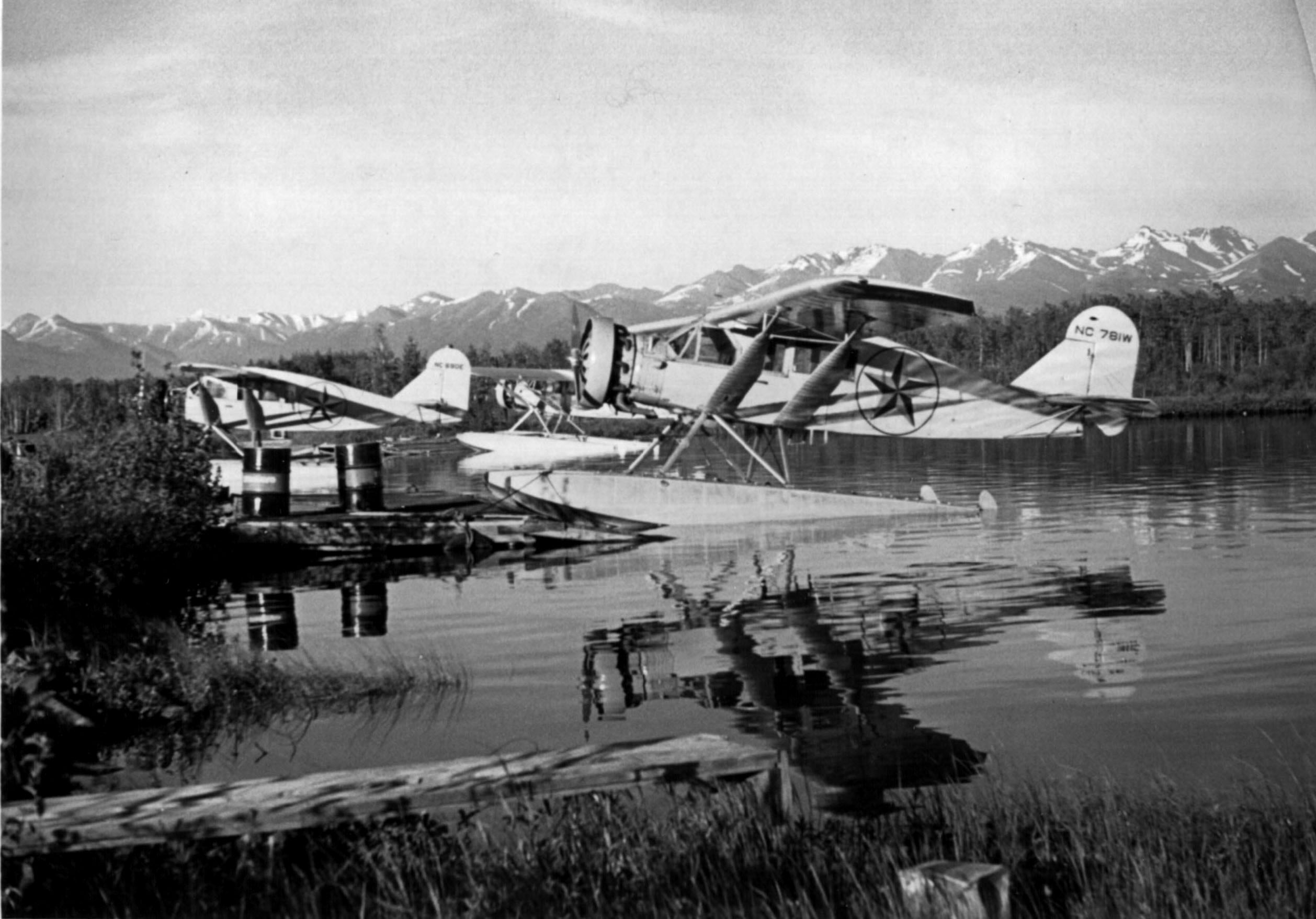
Star Air Lines Bellancas at Lake Spenard, Anchorage.

Lavery Air Service was founded in Fairbanks in 1935 by William L. "Bill" Lavery who was born and raised in Fairbanks. At age 15, Bill went to California to learn to fly, founded Lavery Air Service at age 20, and started the first scheduled service from Fairbanks to Anchorage.

Pollack Flying Service was founded in Fairbanks in 1933 by Frank Pollack who began his Alaska flying with Noel Wien’s Northern Air Transport, flying out of Valdez, Fairbanks and Nome. After selling his company to Alaska Star Airlines he became their operations manager in Fairbanks.

=== Birth of Alaska Airlines ===
Art Woodley had been advised that he would have to change the Woodley Airways name to something other than his own name in order to be considered a serious contender for new routes by the CAB regulators. Woodley sent his attorney to Juneau to file papers that would change the name to Alaska Airlines. The attorney filed the documents, but neglected to pay the $15 filing fee. Alaska Star Airlines quickly filed the legal documents to rename their company, becoming Alaska Airlines on September 16, 1943, and the company was incorporated under its new name on May 2, 1944.

Woodley Airways changed its name to Pacific Northern Airways (PNA) in 1945, changing again in 1947 to Pacific Northern Airlines.

== Livery and logos ==
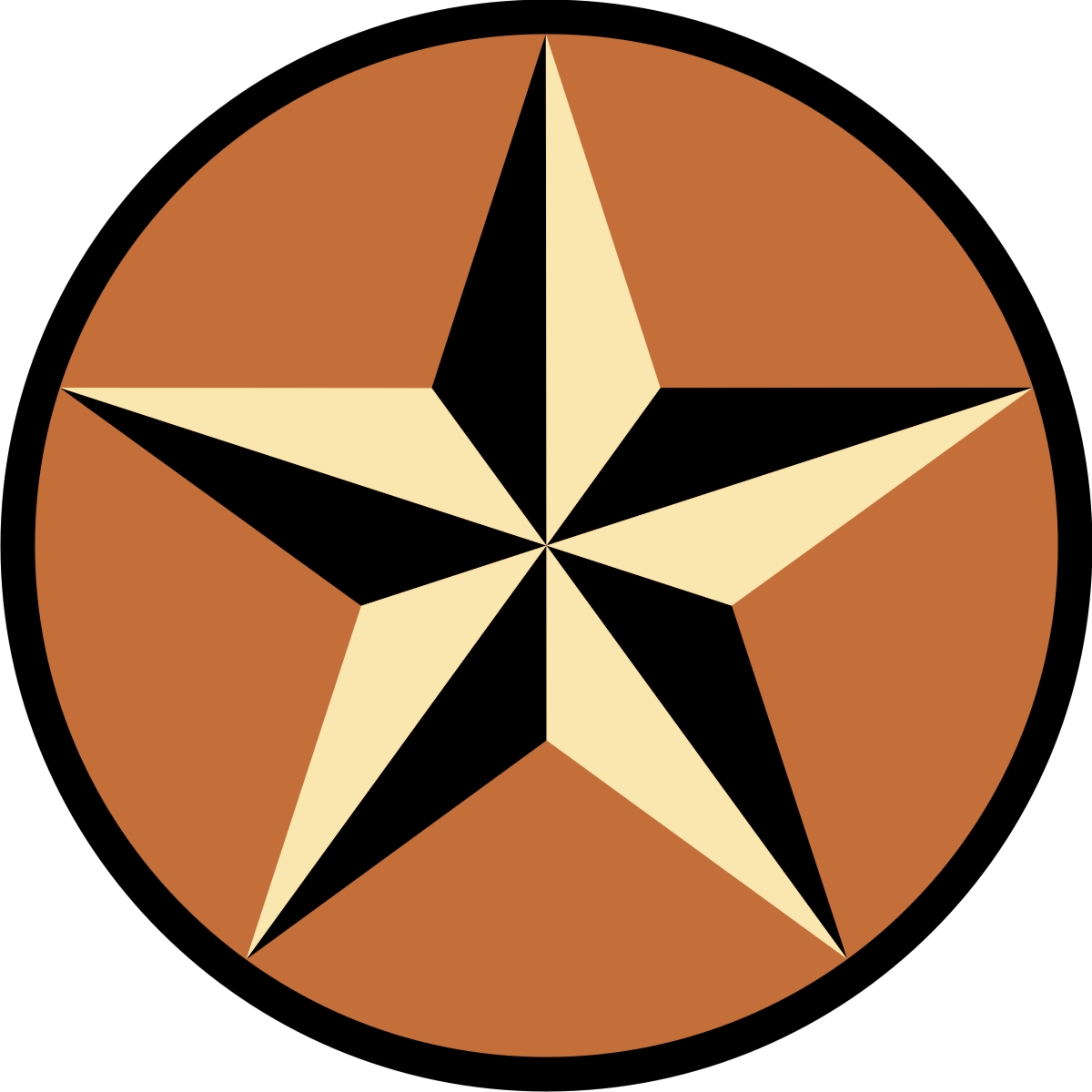
Star Air Lines Logo

The original Star Air Service plane, the Fleet 7 open-cockpit biplane had a three-line identification painted on the side with a barnstar between the words "Flight" & "Instruction" in the middle line. Each point of the barnstar was two colors, light one half, dark on the other. The barnstar was to be emblematic of the North Star, which in the Arctic sky shines almost directly overhead. The company founders named the airplane the Northstar, and had originally considered naming their company North Star Airlines, but instead chose Star Air Service.

The company's second airplane, the Curtiss Robin, had a different three line identification painted on the side of the airplane: "STAR" in very large letters, the second line "AIR SERVICE INC.", and the third line "ANCHORAGE ALASKA", with no barnstar.

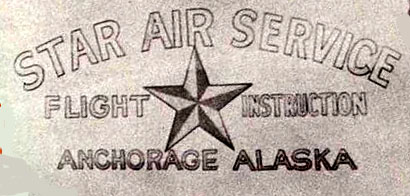
Star Air Service Logo

During the 1937 to 1942 Star Air Lines era, the fleet of Bellanca airplanes were all painted orange, with a large barnstar painted on the side of the airplanes. Each point in the barnstar was two colors, light brown on one half and black on the other. The star was within a black border which circled the star, with the interior the same orange color as the rest of the airplane.

When the company was sold and renamed Alaska Star Airlines, a new logo was adopted with several variations. The new logo contained a symbol of the north star directly over a partial image of the world.

== Routes and destinations ==
In 1942, the CAB granted Star temporary certificates for the following routes:

- Anchorage - McGrath
- Anchorage - Pilot Point
- Fairbanks - McGrath
- Anchorage - Seward
- Anchorage - Fairbanks
- Anchorage - Seldovia
- McGrath - Bethel
- McGrath - Ruby
- All points east of the Yukon River, south of 64th parallel latitude, and west of Prince William Sound

Star acquired a certificate for a Nome - Fairbanks route with the purchase of Mirow Air Service in 1942.

It would not be until 1951, after the company had become Alaska Airlines, that a certificate would be granted for a route between Anchorage - Fairbanks - Seattle - Portland.

== Pilots ==
The bush pilots who flew in the 1930s were a major element in the development of air services in Alaska, and indeed in the development of Alaska itself. They flew single engine aircraft all over the Territory, with no weather reports, no navigation aids, no radios, not even good maps. There were very few landing fields. The pilots took the risks and their contributions to the inhabitants of Alaska were of enormous importance.

== Fleet ==
- Bach T-11P Air Yacht NC219H (c/n 10)
- Beechcraft F17D Staggerwing NC20797 (c/n 332)
- Beechcraft F17D Staggerwing NC19473 (c/n 245)
- Bellanca CH-300 Pacemaker NC168N (c/n 175)
- Bellanca CH-300 Pacemaker NC251M (c/n 154)
- Bellanca CH-300 Pacemaker NC258M (c/n 160)
- Bellanca CH-300 Pacemaker NC259M (c/n 161)
- Bellanca CH-300 Pacemaker NC690E (c/n 140)
- Bellanca CH-300 Pacemaker NC10365 (c/n 187)
- Bellanca CH-400 Skyrocket NC779W (c/n 617)
- Bellanca CH-400 Skyrocket NC781W (c/n 619)
- Bellanca CH-400 Skyrocket NC10795 (c/n 622)
- Bellanca F-2 Skyrocket NC2608 (c/n 802)
- Cessna C-34 NC17054 (c/n 337)
- Curtiss Robin C-1 NC387K (c/n 546)
- Fairchild 24W-9 NC22031 (c/n W9-204)
- Fairchild 100A Pilgrim (modified to 100B) NC709Y (c/n 6605)
- Fairchild 100B Pilgrim NC740N (c/n 6704)
- Fleet 7 Deluxe B-5 NC786V (c/n 367)
- Ford 5-AT-B NC9651 (c/n 5-AT-34) Trimotor
- Ford 5-AT-C NC8410 (c/n-AT-48) Trimotor
- Ford 5-AT-C NC8419 (c/n 5-AT-58) Trimotor
- Lockheed Model 18-56 Lodestar NC21707 (c/n 18-2511)
- Lockheed Orion 9D NC230Y (c/n 201)
- Lockheed Vega 5B NC162W (NC139N)
- Stinson A NC15109 (c/n 9109)
- Stinson A NC15154 (c/n 9114)
- Stinson A NC16110 (c/n 9129)
- Stinson SM-1E Detroiter NC448H (c/n M517)
- Stinson SM-1F Detroiter NC404M (c/n M420)
- Stinson S Junior NC443M (c/n 8104)
- Stinson S Junior NC478M (c/n 8105)
- Stinson S Junior NC8445 (c/n 8007)
- Stinson S Junior NC10828 (c/n 8011)
- Stinson S Junior NC10831 (c/n 8026)
- Stinson SM-7A NC216W (c/n 3002)
- Stinson SM-8A NC211W (c/n 4038)
- Stinson SR-5 NC13849 (c/n 9220)
- Vultee V-1A NC22077 (c/n 16)
- Vultee V-1AD NC14252 (c/n 18)
- Waco UKC NC13896 (c/n 3843)
- Waco ZGC-7 NC17454 (c/n 4550)
- Waco ZGC-7 NC17712 (c/n 4565)

== See also ==
- List of defunct airlines of the United States

== Bibliography ==
- Anchorage Centennial Commission Aviation Committee, "Honoring 100 Alaska Bush Pilots". Anchorage, Alaska, June 24, 1967
- Archie Satterfield, "The Alaska Airlines Story". Alaska Northwest Publishing Company, Anchorage, Alaska, 1981. ISBN 0-88240-165-3
- Brandley, Raymond H. (1981). Waco Airplanes - Ask Any Pilot - The Versatile Cabin Series. US: R.H. Brandly. ISBN 0-9602734-2-5.
- John P. Bagoy, "Legends & Legacies, Anchorage 1910-1935". 2001, ISBN 1-888125-91-8
- Robert W. Stevens, "Alaskan Aviation History", Polynyas Press, Des Moines, Washington, 1989, ISBN 0-929427-01-7
- McLaren & Dickson, "Roy Dickson 1930s Alaska Bush Pilot", Plane Truth Publishing, Nashville, Tennessee, 2009. ISBN 978-1-932496-72-7
- Satterfield, Archie (1981). "The Alaska Airlines Story", Alaska Northwest Publishing Company, Anchorage, Alaska. ISBN 0-88240-165-3
