= Bellanca CH-300 Pacemaker =

1929 American utility aircraft

CH-300 Pacemaker
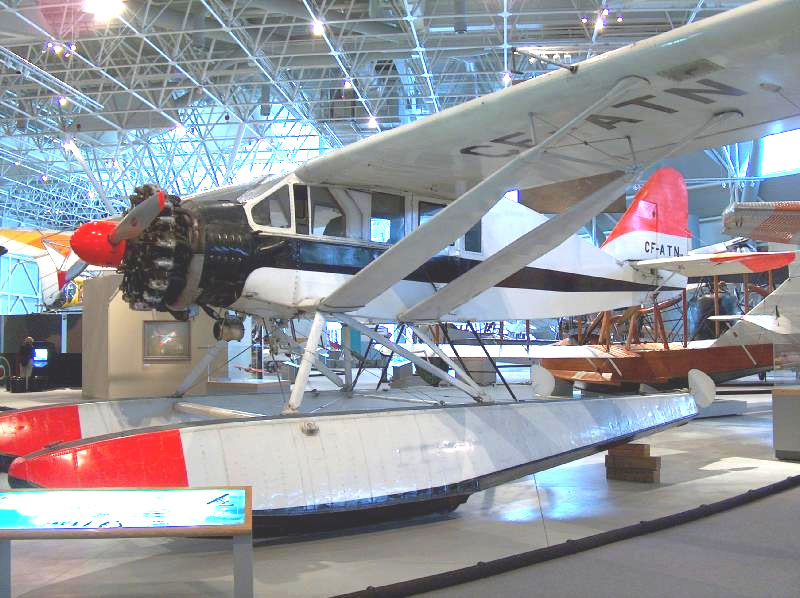
- Bellanca CH-300 CF-ATN Pacemaker Canada Aviation Museum

General information
- Type: Civil utility aircraft
- Manufacturer: Bellanca
- Number built: approximately 35

History
- First flight: 1929
- Developed from: Bellanca CH-200
- Variant: Bellanca CH-400

The Bellanca CH-300 Pacemaker was a six-seat utility aircraft, built primarily in the United States in the 1920s and 1930s. It was a development of the Bellanca CH-200, fitted with a more powerful engine and, like the CH-200, soon became renowned for its long-distance endurance.

== Design and development ==
Bellanca further developed the earlier CH-200 to create the CH-300 Pacemaker. The CH-300 was a conventional, high-wing braced monoplane with fixed tailwheel undercarriage. Like other Bellanca aircraft of the period, it featured "flying struts". (Note: The Bellanca wing struts serve not only to brace the wing structure, but are also airfoils that contribute to the lift of the aircraft.) While the CH-200 was powered by 220 hp Wright J-5 engines, the CH-300 series Pacemakers were powered by 300 hp Wright J-6s. Late in the series, some -300s were fitted with 420 hp Pratt & Whitney Wasps, leading to the CH-400 Skyrocket series.

== Operational history ==
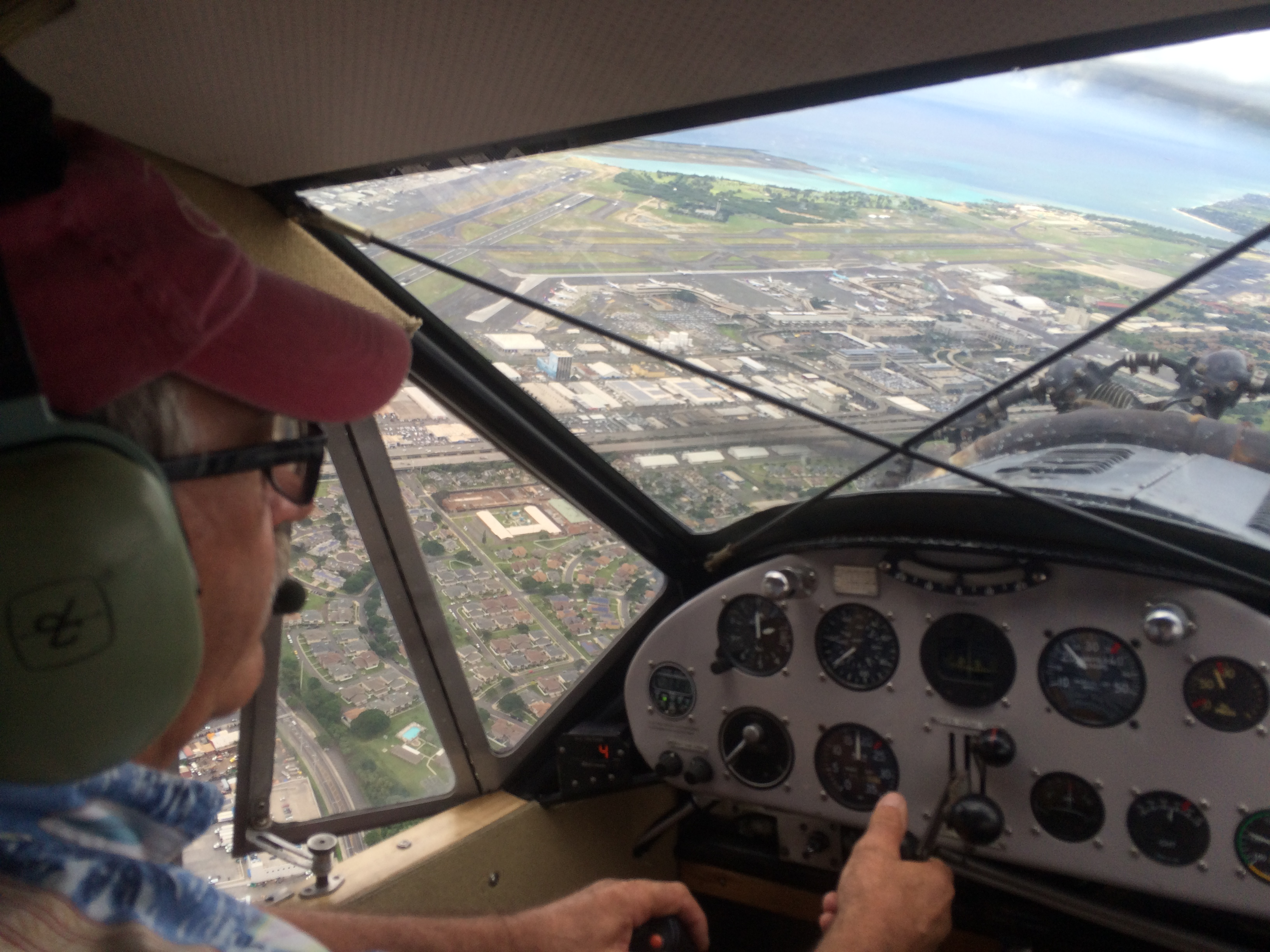
Hawaiian Airlines restored their first Bellanca, NC-251M, seen flying over Honolulu International Airport

Pacemakers were renowned for their long-distance capabilities as well as reliability and weight-lifting attributes, which contributed to their successful operation throughout the world. In 1929, George Haldeman completed the first nonstop flight from New York to Cuba in 12 hours, 56 minutes, flying an early CH-300 (c. 1,310 miles, 101.3 mph). This record was not broken until 55 years later.

In Alaska and the Canadian bush, Bellancas were very popular. Canadian-operated Bellancas were initially imported from the United States, but later, six were built by Canadian Vickers in Montreal and delivered to the RCAF (added to the first order of 29 made in 1929), which used them mainly for aerial photography.

In May 1964, Capt. A.G.K.(Gath) Edward, a senior Air Canada pilot, and Ken Molson (the then curator of the Aviation Museum of Canada based at Rockcliffe) traveled to Juneau Alaska to ferry Bellanca Pacemaker NC3005 back to the museum which had obtained the aircraft. Edward had flown a similar model of the Pacemaker floatplane for General Airways starting in June 1935 during his bushflying days. He and Molson delivered it to its final resting place in the museum on May 30, 1964, after a trip taking five days and just over 30 hours of flight time. The aircraft was reregistered CF-ATN as the original registered a/c was destroyed in an accident in June 1938.

=== Record attempts ===
One of the first records set by a Bellanca CH-300 series aircraft occurred on July 28–30, 1931, when Russell Norton Boardman (age 33) and John Louis Polando (age 29) flew from Floyd Bennett Field — a famous New York City-area early airport on western Long Island from which many record flights originated — to Yeşilköy Airport (present day Atatürk Airport), Istanbul, Turkey aboard an earlier model of the Wright R-975-powered CH-300, a Bellanca "Special J-300" high-wing monoplane named Cape Cod, registration NR761W, making it safely to Istanbul nonstop in 49:20 hours, establishing a distance record of 5,011.8 miles (8,065.7 km), the first known nonstop record flight in aviation history whose distance surpassed either the English (5,000 mi) or metric (8,000 km) mark.

On June 3, 1932, Stanislaus F. Hausner, flying a Bellanca CH Pacemaker named Rose Marie, powered by a 300-hp Wright J-6, attempted a transatlantic flight from Floyd Bennett Field, New York, to Warsaw, Poland. The attempt failed when he made a forced landing at sea; he was rescued by a British tanker eight days later.

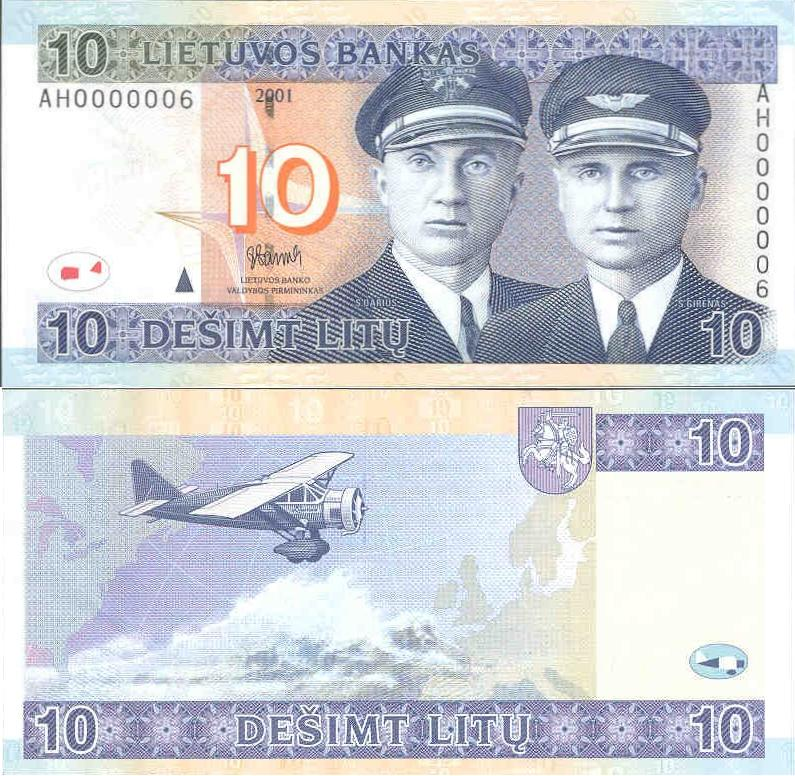
Bellanca CH-300, "Lituanica", on the reverse of 10 litas banknote

On July 15, 1933 6:24 AM two Lithuanian pilots Steponas Darius and Stasys Girėnas flying a heavily modified CH-300 named Lituanica lifted off from Floyd Bennett Field to attempt a non stop transatlantic flight to Kaunas, Lithuania. They successfully crossed the Atlantic, however crashed in the forest near Pszczelnik, Poland. A flying replica of the plane is on display in Lithuanian museum of Aviation, while the wreckage of the original is kept in Vytautas Magnus War museum in Kaunas, Lithuania.

== Variants ==
- CH-300W – CH-300 converted to use a Pratt & Whitney R-985 engine (one converted)
- 300-W – Built with a Pratt & Whitney R-985 engine (seven built)
- PM-300 Pacemaker Freighter – Cargo version (two built)

== Operators ==
Canada
Austin Airways
Canadian Airways
Royal Canadian Air Force (13)
Starratt Airways

El Salvador
TACA Airlines

Mexico
Aeronaves de Mexico

Norway
Widerøes Flyveselskap

United States
Civil Aeronautics Authority (5+)
Department Of Commerce
Inter-Island Airways (Hawaiian Airlines)
Star Air Service
Wien Air Alaska

== Surviving aircraft ==
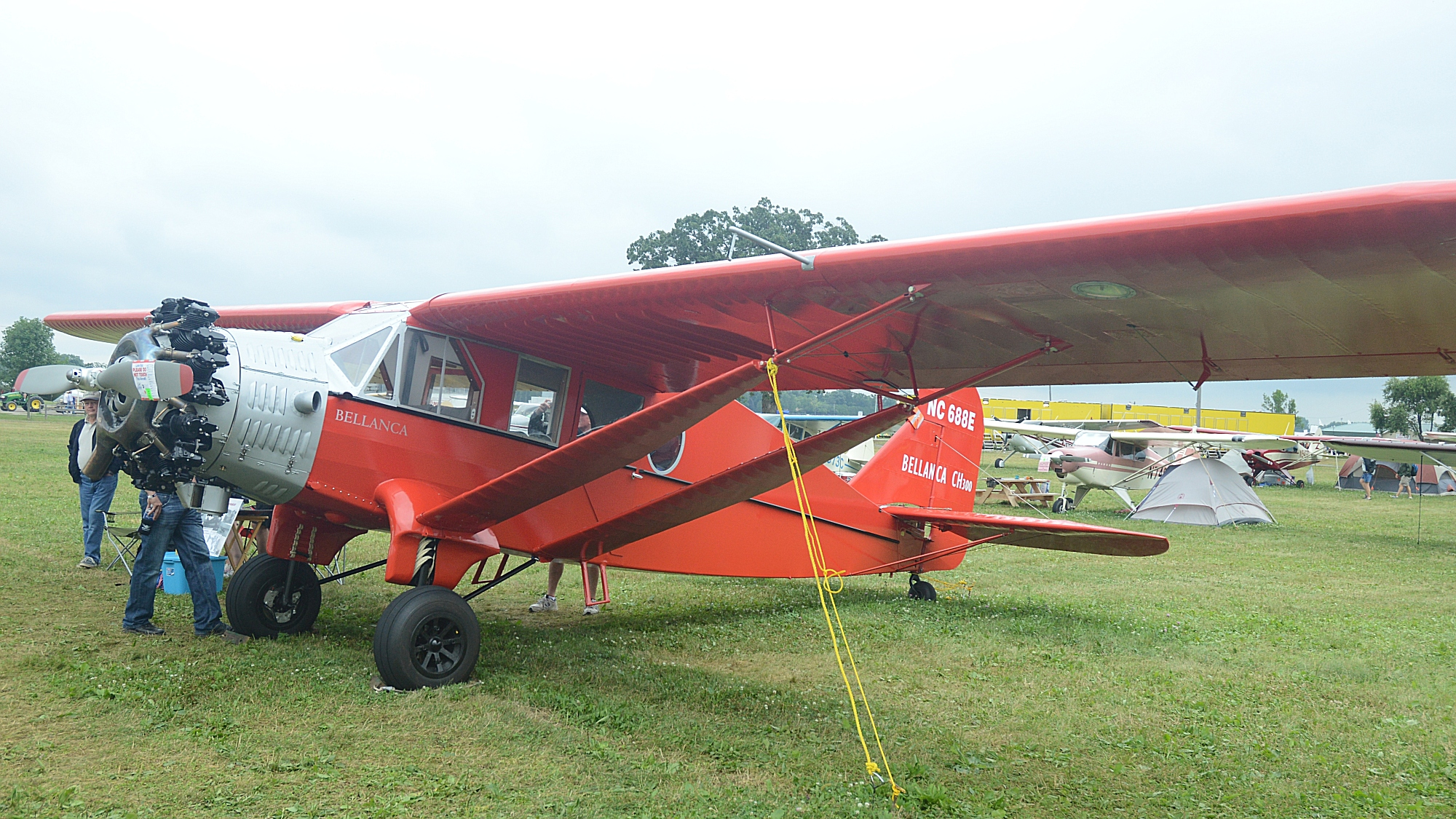
Bellanca CH-300 Pacemaker NC688E at EAA AirVenture, Oshkosh in July 2016

Canada

- 133 – CH-300 airworthy with Wright Holdco in Norman Wells, Northwest Territories. Bought by former President of Republic of Lithuania in 2020.
- 181 – CH-300 on static display at the Canada Aviation and Space Museum in Ottawa, Ontario. It was formerly operated by Alaska Coastal Airlines.

United States

- 150 – CH-300 airworthy with Frederick W. Patterson III in American Canyon, California.
- 154 – CH-300 airworthy with Hawaiian Airlines in Honolulu, Hawaii. It was acquired new in 1929 by Inter-Island Airways (renamed Hawaiian Airlines in 1941) and used for sightseeing over Oahu for two years before being sold in 1933. Acquired from an aviation enthusiast in Oregon in early 2009, the aircraft was restored at the Port Townsend Aero Museum and was unveiled at Honolulu International Airport later that year.
- 187 – CH-300 on static display at the Shannon Air Museum in Fredericksburg, Virginia. It was previously on display at the Virginia Aviation Museum and has been converted to represent the Bellanca WB-2 Columbia.
- CH-300 in storage at the Alaska Aviation Museum in Anchorage, Alaska.

== Specifications ==
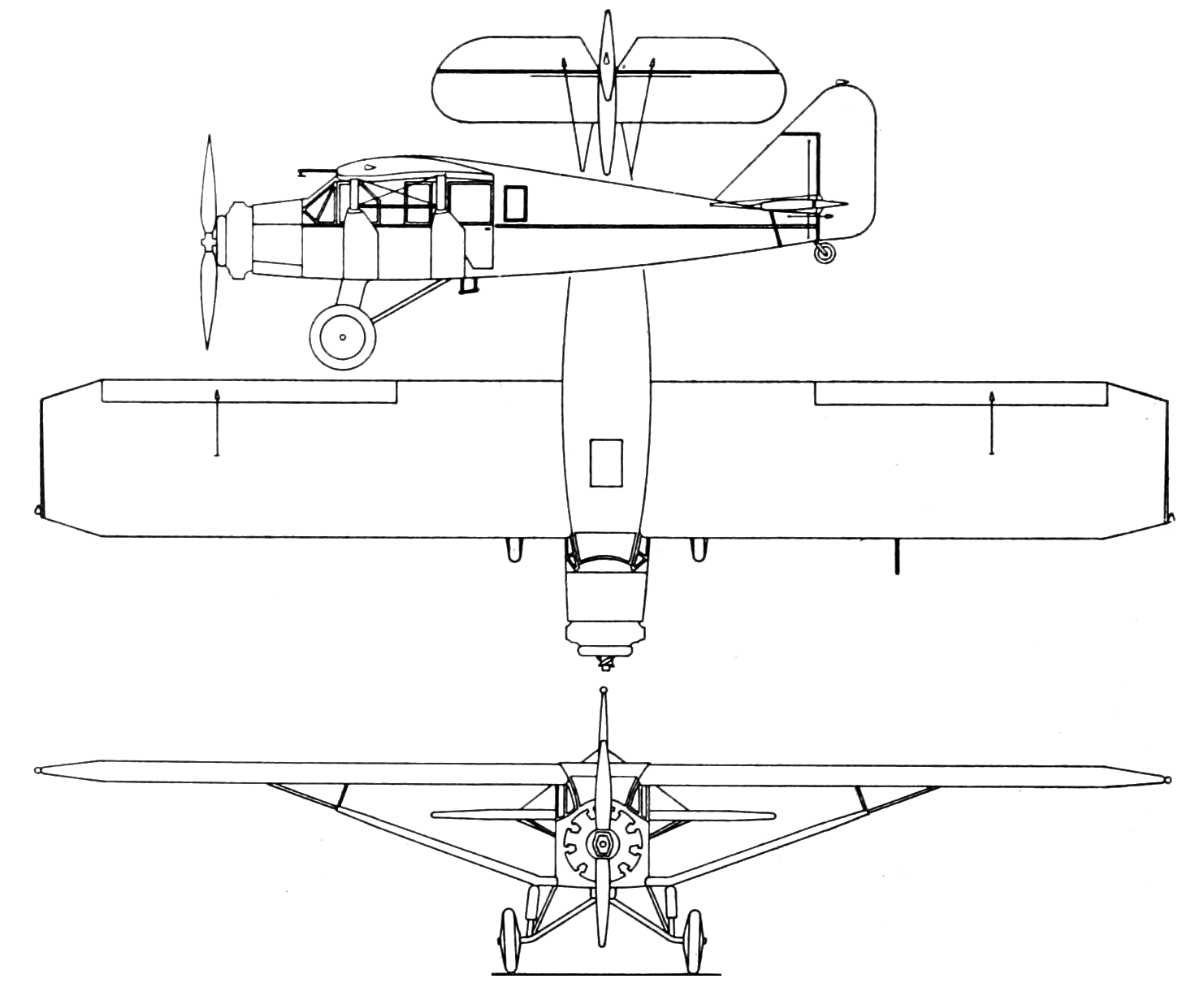
Bellanca CH-300 Pacemaker 3-view drawing from Aero Digest April,1930

Data from U.S. Civil Aircraft Vol. 2 (ATC 101–200)

General characteristics

- Crew: one pilot
- Capacity: five passengers
- Length: 27 ft 9 in (8.46 m)
- Wingspan: 46 ft 4 in (14.12 m)
- Height: 8 ft 4 in (2.54 m)
- Empty weight: 2,275 lb (1,032 kg)
- Gross weight: 4,075 lb (1,848 kg)
- Fuel capacity: 86–105 US gal (72–87 imp gal; 330–400 L)
- Powerplant: 1 × Wright J-6-9 nine-cylinder air-cooled radial engine, 300 hp (220 kW)

Performance

- Maximum speed: 140 mph (230 km/h, 120 kn)
- Cruise speed: 120 mph (190 km/h, 100 kn)
- Range: 675 mi (1,086 km, 587 nmi)
- Service ceiling: 18,000 ft (5,500 m)
- Rate of climb: 1,100 ft/min (5.6 m/s)

== See also ==
- Giuseppe Mario Bellanca

Related development

- Bellanca CH-400

Related lists

- List of aircraft of the Spanish Republican Air Force
