= Fairchild 100 Pilgrim =

1931 transport aircraft family by Fairchild

Fairchild 100
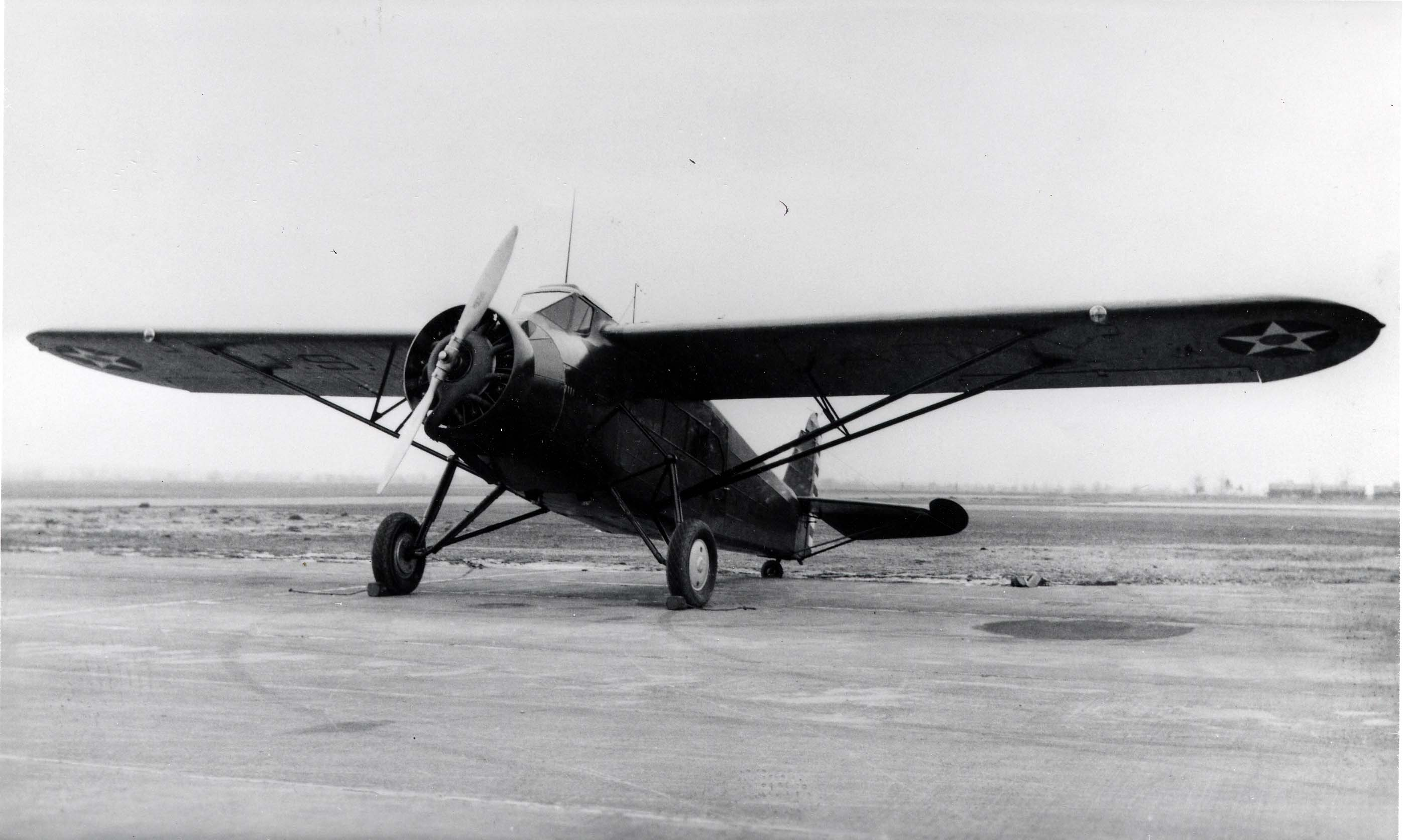
- American/Fairchild Y1C-24, c. 1932

General information
- Type: Airliner
- National origin: United States of America
- Manufacturer: Fairchild Aircraft
- Designer: Virginius E. Clark
- Primary user: American Airlines
- Number built: 27

History
- Introduction date: 1931
- First flight: October 22, 1930

The Fairchild 100 Pilgrim is an American single-engined high-wing monoplane transport, and was one of a series of single-engine utility transports built by Fairchild Aircraft.

== Design and development ==
The 100 was similar in design to the Fairchild C-8 and was an enlarged version of it.

The first flight of the aircraft (NC754Y) was October 22, 1930. Although only one aircraft was completed, a modified version also known as the Pilgrim 100-A was in production for American Airways, the first operator of the type in 1931. After a total of 16 aircraft, an additional batch of ten aircraft with a larger fin were manufactured by the restructured American Aircraft & Engine Corporation that emerged in 1931 from the Fairchild Aircraft Co. The continuing series was built under the designations, Pilgrim 100-B and American/Fairchild Y1C-24. The first six in the new series went to American Airways. The parent company later reinstated the Fairchild name.

== Operational history ==
The sturdy Fairchild 100 series served as both an airliner and a bush plane. In 1932, the US Army Air Corps bought four Pilgrim Model 100-Bs designated the Y1C-24 and were initially assigned as light cargo transport and supply aircraft.

After a short time in service, the Y1C-24s were adapted for use as aeromedical evacuation aircraft, carrying up to four litter patients. The aircraft were assigned to pilot training and pursuit aircraft airfields for use as crash rescue aircraft. Exploiting the Y1C-24's ability to take off and land in a relatively short distance, the Y1C-24s remained in service into the late 1930s when they were replaced by newer air ambulance aircraft.

== Variants ==
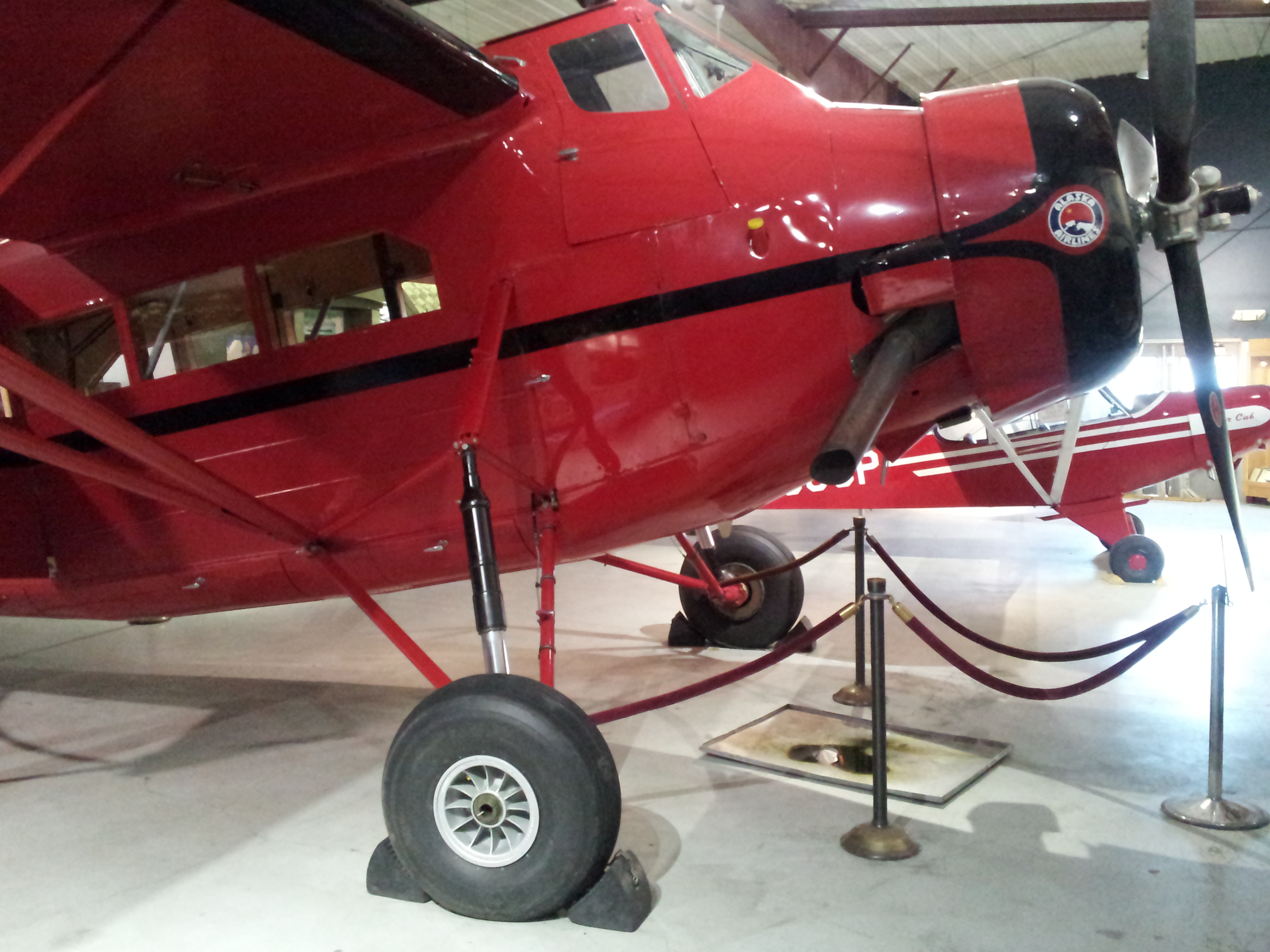
Pilgrim 100-A (NC709Y) at Alaska Aviation Heritage Museum

Pilgrim 100
Prototype of the Pilgrim 100 family, powered by a 575 hp (429 kW) Pratt & Whitney R-1340 Wasp. designed by Virginius Clark, one built.

Pilgrim 100-A
aka American Pilgrim, powered by a 575 hp (429 kW) Pratt & Whitney Hornet B, derived directly from the Fairchild 100. 16 were built, all of which were operated by American Airways.

Pilgrim 100-B
Powered by a 575 hp (429 kW) Wright R-1820 Cyclone B, ten built, of which six for American Airways, and four to the US Army as the Fairchild Y1C-24.

Fairchild Y1C-24
Military variant for the US Army, four built, powered by 575 hp (429 kW) Wright R-1820-1 Cyclone engines.

== Surviving aircraft ==
Pilgrim 100-B N709Y is one of a few surviving aircraft from the early days of aviation in the history of Alaska. At the time of its listing on the National Register of Historic Places in 1986, it was the last Pilgrim that was still flightworthy. It is now in the collection of the Alaska Aviation Museum.

== Specifications (Y1C-24) ==
Data from United States Military Aircraft since 1909

General characteristics

- Crew: one
- Capacity: nine passengers
- Length: 39 ft 2 in (11.94 m)
- Wingspan: 57 ft 0 in (17.38 m)
- Wing area: 459 sq ft (42.7 m^{2})
- Empty weight: 4,195 lb (1,907 kg)
- Gross weight: 7,070 lb (3,214 kg)
- Powerplant: 1 × Wright R-1820-1 Cyclone , 575 hp (429 kW)

Performance

- Maximum speed: 135 mph (217 km/h, 117 kn)
- Cruise speed: 118 mph (190 km/h, 103 kn)
- Range: 510 mi (821 km, 440 nmi)
- Service ceiling: 13,600 ft (4,150 m)
