= Linious "Mac" McGee =

American businessman (1897–1988)

Linious McGee
- Born: March 23, 1897; Francesville, Indiana, US
- Died: June 13, 1988 (aged 91); Reno, Nevada, US
- Other names: Mac McGee
- Occupations: Airline entrepreneur, Miner, Truck driver, Dishwasher, Fur buyer
- Known for: Founder of McGee Airways, predecessor to Alaska Airlines

Linious "Mac" McGee (March 23, 1897 – June 13, 1988) was an American aviation pioneer and founder of McGee Airways, the predecessor company to Alaska Airlines.

== Biography ==
McGee was born in Francesville, Indiana, on March 23, 1897. In his early years he worked in his grandfather's bank in a small Montana town, then spent some time in Alaska working in the mines. He returned to Montana and tried homesteading near Livingston, Montana but went broke.

In 1929, in the midst of the Great Depression, with no money or prospects, he sneaked aboard the SS Aleutian steamship and made the trip to Seward, Alaska as a stowaway. He went to Anchorage and worked for the Standard Oil Distributor driving a delivery truck. He then started a fur trading business using dog teams and chartered airplanes to travel throughout the area buying furs. He needed his own airplane in order to reach Alaska's remote villages. In 1931 he partnered with Harvey W. Barnhill, an early day Alaska bush pilot to purchase a three-seat Stinson airplane from Varney Airlines in San Francisco. They shipped the plane to Alaska on a steamship and founded Barnhill & McGee Airways in Anchorage.

Although "Mac" learned to fly, his primary interest was in business management and organization. In about 1932, McGee bought Barnhill's interest in the company, purchased another Stinson airplane and founded McGee Airways, which was one of the first air services in Anchorage. McGee Airways grew into a fleet of seven black and silver Stinson airplanes. In 1934 he sold the company to rival Anchorage-based competitor Star Air Service for $50,000 and managed the combined operation for several years before going into mining. Star Air Service became financially unstable after McGee left, and he was called back to manage the company again.

After leaving Star for the last time, he returned to mining, and retired to the "lower 48." He died in Reno, Nevada, on June 13, 1988.

McGee Airways became part of Star Air Service which through a long series of mergers and acquisitions became Alaska Airlines in 1944.
