= Bellanca CH-400 Skyrocket =

American single engine utility aircraft

CH-400 Skyrocket
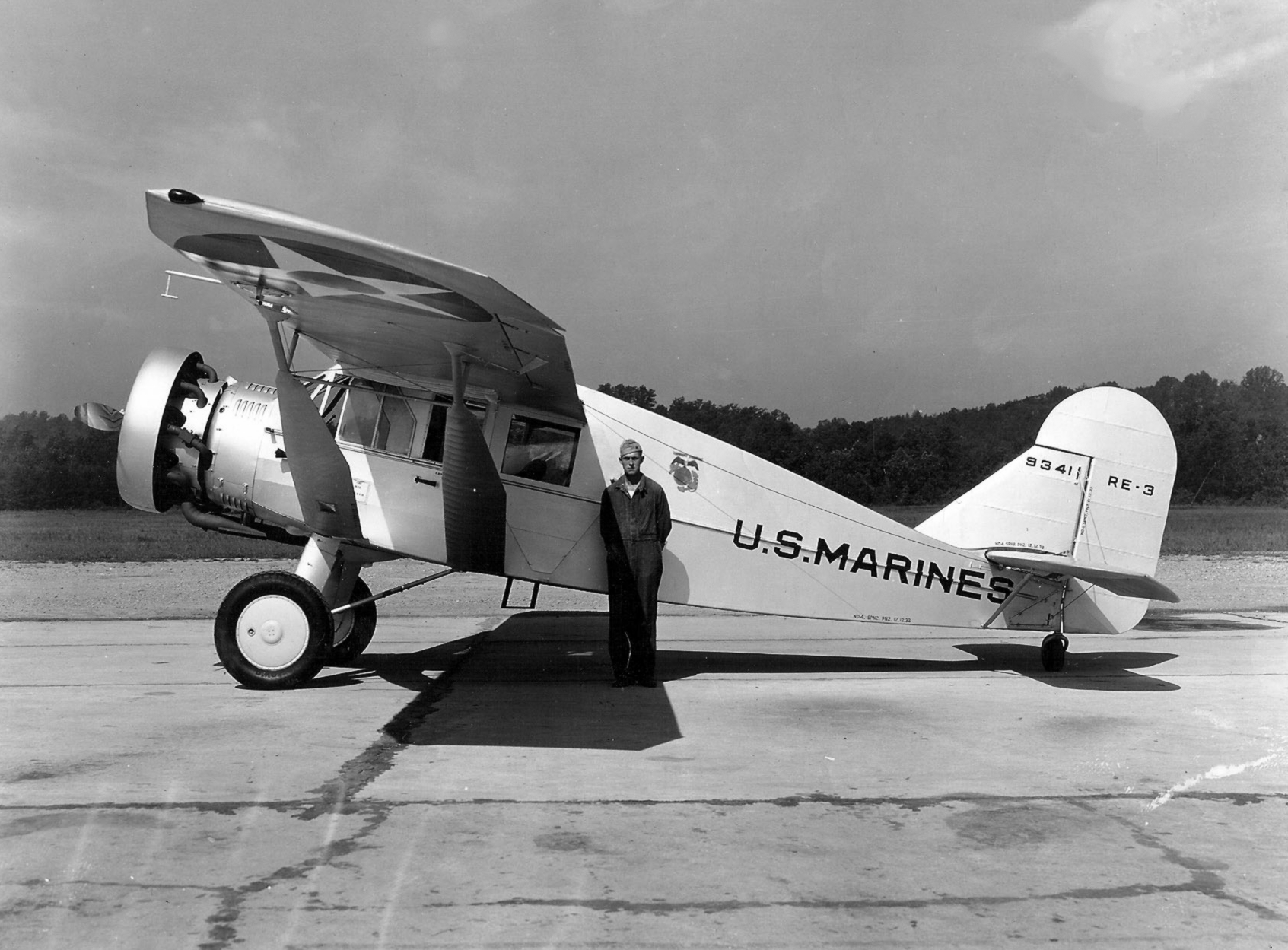
- XRE-3

General information
- Type: Civil utility aircraft
- Manufacturer: Bellanca
- Primary user: Private pilot owners
- Number built: 32

History
- First flight: 1930

The Bellanca CH-400 Skyrocket is a six-seat utility aircraft built in the United States in the 1930s, a continuation of the design lineage that had started with the Bellanca WB-2. Retaining the same basic airframe of the preceding CH-200 and CH-300, the CH-400 was fitted with a more powerful Pratt & Whitney Wasp radial engine.

Three examples were purchased by the U.S. Navy under the designation RE. Two were used for radio research, and one as an air ambulance for the U.S. Marine Corps. This latter aircraft was reconfigured to carry two stretchers.

The aircraft was also available in a deluxe version for private pilot owners, fitted with a more powerful Wasp variant providing 450 hp (336 kW) and detail enhancements.

Two of these aircraft were purchased by the government of the Dominion of Newfoundland in 1937, and one later ended in private hands. NC10294 was changed to VO-BCD and NC13155 to VO-BDF.

== Variants ==
CH-400
Six-seat utility aircraft., powered by a Pratt & Whitney Wasp radial piston engine.
XRE-1
One aircraft used for radio research work at Naval Air Station Anacostia.
XRE-2
One light transport aircraft for the US Navy.
XRE-3
One two-stretcher air ambulance aircraft for the US Marine Corps.

== Military operators ==
United States

- United States Marine Corps
- United States Navy

== Specifications (CH-400 Skyrocket) ==
Data from American airplane specifications

General characteristics

- Crew: one
- Capacity: five passengers
- Length: 27 ft 10 in (8.48 m)
- Wingspan: 46 ft 4 in (14.12 m)
- Height: 8 ft 4 in (2.54 m)
- Wing area: 273 sq ft (25.4 m^{2})
- Empty weight: 2,592 lb (1,176 kg)
- Gross weight: 4,600 lb (2,087 kg)
- Fuel capacity: 120 US gal (100 imp gal; 450 L)
- Powerplant: 1 × Pratt & Whitney Wasp C radial engine, 420 hp (310 kW)

Performance

- Maximum speed: 155 mph (249 km/h, 135 kn)
- Cruise speed: 130 mph (210 km/h, 110 kn)
- Range: 750 mi (1,210 km, 650 nmi)
- Service ceiling: 20,000 ft (6,100 m)
- Rate of climb: 1,250 ft/min (6.4 m/s)
