= Roy F. Jones =

Roy Franklin Jones
- Born: October 16, 1893; Sumas, Washington
- Died: February 17, 1974 (aged 80); Vancouver, Washington
- Military career
- Allegiance: United States
- Branch: Army Signal Corps (World War I)
- Service years: First World War; Second World War
- Rank: Major
- Known for: First to establish commercial air service in Alaska, Founder of Northbird Aviation Company
- Other work: Pioneer Airways (co-founder)

Roy Franklin Jones (October 16, 1893 – February 17, 1974) was an aviator in the Ketchikan, Alaska area. Jones learned to fly in the aviation section of the Army Signal Corps during World War I.

Jones was the first pilot to establish commercial air service in Alaska. On July 17, 1922, pilot Roy Jones and mechanic Gerald Smith landed at Ketchikan from Seattle, Washington in the Tongass Narrows. There had been several mechanical breakdowns and some bad weather enroute. Jones flew a Curtiss MF-6-K Seagull, named Northbird, an open cockpit biplane equipped with a Hispano-Suiza 180 HP engine.

On the day he arrived, Jones sent a telegraph ahead to say he would arrive in 90 minutes. When he arrived there was a crowd which carried Jones to Pioneer Hall where Joe Ulmer gave a welcome speech. He stayed in the area, using Northbird to operate under the name Northbird Aviation Company. The airline did not prosper, as Jones crashed the flying boat in Heckman Lake in 1923. Jones continued living in Ketchikan until 1928.

Jones later became involved with another Alaskan airline, joining Vern C. Gorst and C.R. Wright to form Pioneer Airways in 1930.

A veteran of World War I as a pilot, during World War II Jones joined the United States Army Air Forces, being stationed at Ladd Field, Fairbanks, from where he retired as a Major in the reserves post-war.

Jones died in Vancouver, Washington, on February 17, 1974.

== Legacy ==
There is a mountain named after Jones in Ketchikan; Roy Jones mountain sits near Northbird mountain, which was, in turn, named after Jones' first airline.
