= Barnhill & McGee Airways =

US airline

- Founded: 1931; 95 years ago
- Ceased operations: 1932; 94 years ago
- Focus cities: Anchorage, Alaska * Bristol Bay, Alaska
- Fleet size: 2
- Destinations: Numerous
- Headquarters: Anchorage, Alaska
- Key people: Linious "Mac" McGee * Harvey W. Barnhill

Barnhill & McGee Airways, one of the earliest air services in Alaska, was founded in Anchorage as a partnership between Harvey W. Barnhill and Linious "Mac" McGee in 1932. The airline served McGee’s fur business and offered service between Anchorage and Bristol Bay. Although Barnhill & McGee Airways lasted for only two years, it was the forerunner of McGee Airways which was the forerunner of Alaska Airlines.

== History ==
Harvey W. Barnhill nicknamed "Barney" Barnhill was a legendary, hard-drinking bush pilot. He came to Alaska in 1929 and was part of Carl Ben Eielson’s team in Fairbanks transporting personnel and a fortune in furs from the trading ship Nanuck that was stranded in the ice off the coast of Siberia. He flew in the search for the Eielson wreck after his fatal crash in the winter of 1929-1930.

An Indiana native, Linious "Mac" McGee who subsequently worked as a miner, truck driver, dishwasher and fur buyer, came to Alaska in the fall of 1929 by stowing away on an Alaska-bound steamship looking for business opportunities, after several failed ventures. He became a fur buyer using dog teams & chartered airplanes. He needed an airplane of his own to go to some of the remote areas of Alaska to buy furs.

McGee teamed up with "Barney" Barnhill in 1931, purchasing a three-seat Stinson SM-8 aircraft for $5000 from Varney Airlines in San Francisco. They shipped the plane to Alaska on a steamship, taking it off the ship in Valdez, where they reassembled the airplane on the beach, flew it to Anchorage and formed Barnhill & McGee Airways. McGee learned to fly but preferred managing, so he hired other pilots and paid them a commission of the gross sales generated by the planes they flew.

== Operations ==
For the first few months they used the Stinson only for McGee’s fur buying trips to remote villages, but by the middle of Jan 1932, they were running two display adds in the Anchorage Daily Times, one for McGee’s fur business and the other for Barnhill & McGee Airways as an airline offering service between Anchorage and Bristol Bay.

== Dissolved ==
In the late spring of 1932, Barnhill & McGee dissolved their partnership after using a bank loan to purchase an additional Stinson. While Barnhill kept the newer Stinson at first, he sold it back to McGee when winter arrived. McGee went on to found McGee Airways flying out of Anchorage. Although Barnhill & McGee Airways lasted only a short time, it was the forerunner of McGee Airways which was the forerunner of Alaska Airlines.

== See also ==
- List of defunct airlines of the United States
- Linious "Mac" McGee
- Harvey W. Barnhill
- McGee Airways
- Alaska Airlines

== Bibliography ==
- Anchorage Centennial Commission Aviation Committee, “Honoring 100 ALASKA BUSH PILOTS”. Anchorage, Alaska, June 24, 1967
- Archie Satterfield, “The Alaska Airlines Story”. Alaska Northwest Publishing Company, Anchorage, Alaska, 1981. ISBN 0-88240-165-3
- John P. Bagoy, “Legends & Legacies, Anchorage 1910-1935”. 2001, ISBN 1-888125-91-8
