= Archie Satterfield =

American journalist

- Born: June 18, 1933; Howards Ridge, Missouri
- Died: November 21, 2011 (aged 78); Bellingham, Washington
- Occupations: Author, journalist

Archie Satterfield (June 18, 1933 – November 21, 2011) was a Seattle-based author and journalist.

Satterfield was born and raised in the Missouri Ozarks. He joined the American Navy in 1952 and later graduated with an English degree from the University of Washington. He worked as a journalist for various newspapers, including Seaside Signal, Longview Daily News, Seattle Times, and the Seattle Post-Intelligencer, before starting his own magazine, Northwest Edition, in 1980. In 1987 he became a full-time freelance writer, penning corporate histories for Alaska Airlines, Crescent Foods, Darigold, and Tillamook Cheese. He also authored 40 books on history and travel, many of which covered Alaska and the Pacific Northwest.
