= McGee Airways =

American airline

- Founded: 1932; 94 years ago
- Ceased operations: 1934; 92 years ago (merged with Star Air Service)
- Focus cities: Anchorage, Alaska; Bristol Bay, Alaska
- Fleet size: 7
- Destinations: Numerous
- Headquarters: Anchorage, Alaska
- Key people: Linious "Mac" McGee (Founder)

McGee Airways was an American airline, founded in Anchorage, Alaska, in 1932 by Linious "Mac" McGee. Starting with a single three seat Stinson airplane, the company grew and the fleet of aircraft expanded to seven Stinsons.

Although McGee was an excellent manager, there were two major competitors in Anchorage: Star Air Service and Woodley Airways. There was not enough business to support the three companies, and they were all struggling financially. In 1937 McGee sold the company to Star Air Service.

When Mac McGee sold the company, he began working several mining claims, but was called back to manage Star Air Service on several occasions while they continued to struggle financially. He left the airline business for the last time in 1937 when he arranged to sell Star Air Service to a new group of investors who hoped to make the company a major player in the Alaska airline business.

McGee Airways was the original Alaska air service that, through a long series of mergers and acquisitions ultimately became Alaska Airlines in 1944.

== History ==
McGee came to Alaska as a stowaway in 1929. He worked as a miner, truck driver, dishwasher and fur trader. In 1931 he partnered with Harvey W. Barnhill to form Barnhill & McGee Airways with a three-seat Stinson SM8A which they had purchased from Varney Airlines in San Francisco. In 1932 McGee bought Barnhill’s interest and dissolved the company. McGee obtained a bank loan and purchased a second Stinson airplane and hired half-brother Estol Call to bring it to Anchorage, where he founded McGee Airways.

=== Operations ===
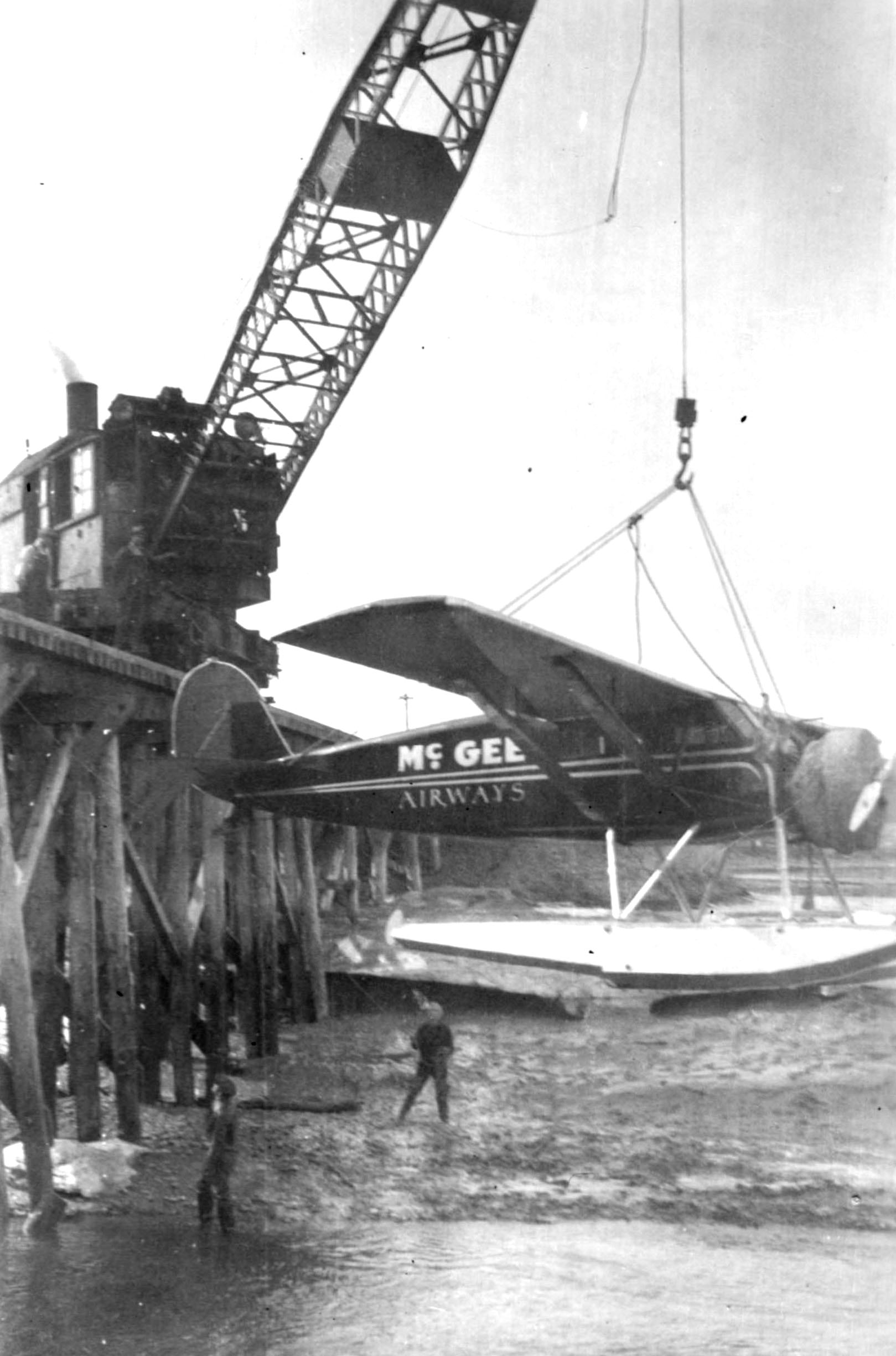
Railroad crane will lower plane into Ship Creek in Anchorage at high tide where it can taxi into Cook Inlet for take-off.

Although McGee learned to fly he did not like flying. He preferred to hire pilots and personally manage the company. He paid his pilots on commission based on the income they generated. Originally the operation was completely un-scheduled. They flew trappers, hunters, tourists, salesmen, sport fishermen and commercial fishermen to destinations throughout the Alaska Territory, going from place to place delivering and picking up cargo and passengers until returning to home base in Anchorage. The pilots collected cash for the flights and settled with McGee each time they returned to Anchorage. The Interior Department paid to have indigenous natives, who were wards of the government, flown to hospitals for medical care.

The airplanes had no radios or navigational instruments. Only a very few of the large cities had landing fields. In summer the planes were equipped with pontoons for landing on lakes and rivers. Lake Spenard was the Anchorage pontoon base. In winter the planes were converted to skis, landing on ice and snow covered waterways or clearings. Winter home base was Merrill Field in Anchorage.

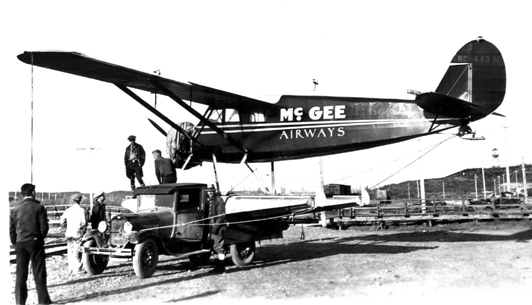
McGee Airways Stinson being transported by pickup truck to Alaska Railroad Bridge.

In the fall of 1934 McGee Airways obtained the first airmail contract to deliver mail to the Bristol Bay area of southwest Alaska. He hired Roy Dickson to fly the new mail route. Dickson had brought a B-1 Ryan airplane to Alaska in March, 1934, and flew the summer mining season for Alaska Exploration & Mining Company out of Cantwell. McGee approached him in the Parsons Hotel in Anchorage with a proposition. "It's a new project, never been tried before, do you want to try it?" Dickson was anxious to get on McGee's payroll so he could bring his family to Alaska from the states. His Ryan was in need of an overhaul, and he had been paid mostly in company stock rather than cash for his summer's work. He accepted McGee's offer, sold the Ryan to Bowman Airways, and sent for his family. Dickson flew the mail route until late 1935, when he founded his own company Bering Sea Airways.

The new air mail delivery flight took a minimum of three days with deliveries to Iliamna Lake, Naknek, Egegik and Ugashik, the southernmost village on the run, then returning with deliveries to Nushagak, Dillingham, another stop at Iliamna Lake and back to Anchorage. This new connection to the "outside world" allowed remote villagers to obtain products previously unavailable. The pilots always had a shopping list when they returned to Anchorage.

Previously mail had been delivered by steamships in the summer and dog teams in winter. In winter months from October 1 until May 1 only letters, cards, packages of seeds weighing less than a pound, and newspapers going to libraries or newspaper publishers were carried. Packages were held in Seattle until the summer months when they could be taken in by boat.

McGee was a workaholic, working seven days a week. He was also known as an honest businessman, and shrewd manager. He pioneered the concept of having a fleet of identical aircraft so that parts would be interchangeable. In order to make a profit, he loaded his planes with all they could carry, causing the Department of Commerce aircraft inspector to frequently cite the company for overloading aircraft.

McGee Airways had two significant competitors in Anchorage, Woodley Airways and Star Air Service. Woodley Airways was founded by "Art" Woodley in 1932, and in April 1932, three young Seattle pilots Charlie Ruttan, Steve Mills and Jack Waterworth founded Star Air Service, planning to offer flight instruction and charter service.

=== Dissolution ===
By the winter of 1934, it was apparent that there was not enough business to support three air services in Anchorage with the surplus of airplanes and an economy suffering from the Great Depression. McGee was also anxious to work some mining claims he had staked. Star Air Service acquired McGee Airways in 1934 for $50,000. McGee stipulated that if not paid on time, he would return and manage the operation until receiving his money. The acquisition made Star Air Service the largest airline operation in Alaska. By 1936 it had a fleet of 22 planes and a gross annual income of $190,000. But Star's pilot owner/managers were a restless bunch and changes in the front office were common. McGee returned to manage the company twice, and in 1937, he bought his way back into the airline and finally sold the company to a new group of investors, ending his involvement in the airline business. After working his mining operations for a number of years, McGee retired to the "lower 48" and died in Reno, Nevada, in 1988 at age 91.

== Aircraft ==
McGee Airways only operated Stinson airplanes.

- 3 Stinson S Junior
- Stinson SM-1E
- Stinson SM-1F
- Stinson SM-7A
- Stinson SM-8A
- Stinson SR-5

=== Pilots ===
The bush pilots who flew in the 1930s were a most important element in the development of air services in Alaska, and indeed in the development of Alaska itself. They flew single engine aircraft all over the Territory, with no weather reports, no navigation aides, no radios in aircraft, not even good maps, and there were very few landing fields. The pilots took the risks and their contributions to the inhabitants of Alaska were of enormous importance. The bush pilots who flew for McGee Airways were:

- Estol Call
- Roy S. Dickson (1901-1958)
- James M. "Jim" Dodson (1902-1969)
- Ed Fageros
- Don Glass (d.1943)
- Don H. Goodman (b. 1909)
- Gordon MacKenzie (1894-1963)
- John W. "Johnny" Moore (1907-1988)
- Kenneth W. "Kenny" Neese (1903-1944)
- Murrell Sasseen (1906-1974)
- Dan Victor (1901-1942)
- Oscar Winchell (1903-1987)

== See also ==
- List of defunct airlines of the United States
