= Lucien Frank Barr =

American aviator, businessman, and politician

Lucien Francis "Frank" Barr
- Born: August 22, 1903; Lawrence County, Illinois, U.S.
- Died: April 23, 1983 (aged 79)
- Occupation: Aviator Businessman Politician

Lucien Francis Barr (August 22, 1903 – April 23, 1983) was an American aviator, businessman, and politician.

Barr was born in Lawrence County, Illinois. In 1918, he joined the United States Army and served in the cavalry. He then served in the United States Army Air Corps and learned how to fly. In 1924, he moved to Detroit, Michigan and joined the Michigan National Guard, where he was a pilot in the 107th Observation Squadron. He was a lieutenant.

He moved to Alaska Territory and formed the North Canada Air Express and flew in the Atlin, Canada and Juneau, Alaska Territory, United States. In 1937, he moved with his wife to Fairbanks, Alaska Territory. He then worked for the Alaska Airlines from 1946 to 1956. Barr served in the Alaska Territorial Senate from 1949 to 1953 and was a Democrat. He served in the Alaska Constitutional Convention of 1955-1956 and also briefly as a United States marshal. In 1956, Barr and his wife moved to Portland, Oregon where they owned a trailer park. In 1974, Barr and his wife moved to Grants Pass, Oregon. He died of cancer there in 1983. He is buried at the Hillcrest Memorial Park Cemetery, Grants Pass, Oregon.
