= Airline trading card =

Trading card distributed by airlines

An airline trading card is a type of trading card depicting a commercial airplane (Note: With the exception of Frontier Airlines trading cards, which depict cartoon characters.) that is offered by an airline. Generally, it is used to promote interaction with airline crew because it can only be given out by a pilot. Several airlines offer trading cards, such as Southwest, Delta, Frontier, United, American, and Alaska Airlines.

== Examples ==
=== Delta Air Lines ===
Delta Air Lines offers airplane trading cards of all of the plane types in its fleet; several customers have collected all 68. Ryan Gumm, the Senior Vice President of flight operations for Delta, reported that in 2024 over 3 million cards were distributed, saying that "this simple, yet impactful interaction between our pilots and customers elevates and enriches the flight experience – and has created meaningful connections and memorable moments along the way." The only instance in which Delta trading cards were not directly given by pilots was when the airline celebrated its 100th anniversary in 2025, and customers were able to get a two-card commemorative set upon purchasing a gift card.

=== Spirit Airlines ===
Spirit Airlines was one of the most recent airlines to introduce a trading card, doing so in February 2026. They depicted Spirit's Airbus aircraft. Spirit previously had digital trading cards.

=== Alaska Airlines ===
Alaska Airlines trading cards were first produced and offered in the 1990s; this continued after their merging with Hawaiian Airlines.

==== Hawaiian Airlines ====
Hawaiian Airlines only debuted trading cards following their merging with Alaska Airlines, in November 2025. Digital trading cards are available by scanning a QR code in the placard of an aircraft. Hawaiian uniquely offers another commemorative souvenir, "keiki" or "children's wings", badges resembling pilot's wings with the Hawaiian airline logo and the words "Future Pilot".

=== Frontier Airlines ===
Uniquely, Frontier Airlines' trading cards display cartoon characters instead of airplanes, such as Griz the Bear, Otto the Owl, and Flo the Flamingo.

=== Southwest Airlines ===
Southwest Airlines also offers trading cards; the most common trading card is of the "Heart One" livery, the livery used on most Southwest planes. Cards depict an image of the plane on the front and back, and on the back is information about the aircraft.

=== American Airlines ===
In 2026, American Airlines unveiled a centennial-themed set of airline trading cards to celebrate 100 years of service.

=== United Airlines ===
United Airlines' trading cards were originally created in 2002, with pilot Denny Flanagan individually printing them for the Boeing 757 and 767 aircraft he flew. United subsequently introduced them across their entire fleet in 2003.
