= Passenger Wi-Fi on trains =

This article summarises the provision on passenger Wi-Fi on trains, which varies across different countries and regions.

== United Kingdom ==
Claire Perry, then Rail Minister, announced in 2015 that England and Wales would benefit from free on-board wi-fi from 2017.

In May 2026, the British government announced plans to upgrade Wi-Fi on trains by introducing satellite internet access.

== United States ==
The national intercity passenger rail service, Amtrak, offers Wi-Fi on some trains, but service tends to be inconsistent.

== Other regions ==
Provision varies across different countries in Europe and Asia.

== See also ==
- Passenger Wi-Fi on subway trains
- Inflight Connectivity
