= Passenger Wi-Fi on subway trains =

Passenger Wi-Fi on subway trains is a service provided primarily for wireless internet access for passengers on board subway trains.

Wi-Fi for subway passengers is a standard service provided in the majority of large cities worldwide. Wi-Fi in stations is present in the systems of Hong Kong, London, New York, Moscow, St. Petersburg, Riyadh, Singapore, Tokyo, and Toronto. Delivering high-speed Wi-Fi on underground trains is more complex and requires two radio networks: one which delivers the signal to tunnels and trains (a Trackside Network or TSN), and a Wi-Fi network on board the trains to enable passenger connectivity. Wi-Fi connectivity currently operates on underground trains in Moscow and St. Petersburg in Russia; Seoul in South Korea; Delhi's Airport Express in India; and Guangzhou, Shenzhen, Wuhan, and Shanghai in China.

The first known subway system to install onboard Wi-Fi was the Seoul Metro in 2009. The trackside network was based on WiMAX or WiBro (IEEE 802.16m). Trains were connected to the TSN at a speed of about 30 Mbit/s and the Wi-Fi service was provided only to Korean Telecom (KT) subscribers over a private Wi-Fi network. Later, in 2017, it was announced that the network would be renovated to deliver high-speed Wi-Fi to the general public. High-speed free public onboard Wi-Fi was first introduced by MaximaTelecom in the Moscow Metro in 2013. By the end of 2014, all 12 metro lines were equipped with a 5 GHz TSN delivering up to 150 Mbit/s per train with an average of 80 Mbit/s. The last known deployment was in Guangzhou in 2018, which reportedly features over 400 Mbit/s speed per train.

The fastest onboard network in the world was built in the St. Petersburg metro. It features up to 500 Mbit/s speed per train and was built by MaximaTelecom at the end of 2017.

== Available technologies ==
Wi-Fi on subway trains is typically based on cellular (WiMAX, 3G or LTE) radio networks or private trackside networks in the 5 GHz band. Among these two alternatives, LTE and 5 GHz TSN are the only technologies used in contemporary installations.

There are no reported cases of implementing LTE coverage specifically to deliver passenger Wi-Fi, since LTE itself is sufficient to enable passenger connectivity on moving trains. LTE coverage with leaking cable antennas is also far more expensive than a TSN, costing $100K-500K per km of track (in systems with separated tracks for two directions) compared with $50K-100K per km of track for a TSN, based on reported investments in these networks worldwide.

Therefore, public Wi-Fi on trains can be delivered using existing LTE coverage in tunnels or separately deployed private TSN's.

To deliver onboard Wi-Fi, in addition to ensuring radio coverage in tunnels, the operator has to equip the head cars with radio devices to capture the signal from the tunnels, to install Wi-Fi access points in all train cars and to deploy a wired local-area network (LAN) on board.

=== LTE-based Wi-Fi ===
For LTE-based Wi-Fi, LTE routers are commonly installed on both head cars (actually, the head car and the end car). In order to deliver high-speed Wi-Fi, LTE routers must ensure the LTE aggregation functionality, which bonds two or more LTE data channels into one logical channel having a stable (without dead spots) and robust connection up to 150 Mbit/s in off-peak hours.

The main issue here is that LTE networks share their throughput between trains and passengers using LTE on board. During rush hours, LTE networks can be overloaded leading the Wi-Fi service to become unavailable. At least, the throughput can't be guaranteed.

The main advantage of LTE-based Wi-Fi is the relatively low investment required – only the trains need to be equipped. Another benefit – the train operator can introduce the service without any involvement by the subway operator if they are different companies. But this can be the case only if multi-operator LTE coverage is already in place.

LTE-aggregation routers and integrated user experience solutions are offered by multiple companies, including Icomera, Nomad Digital, Klass Telecom and Passengera.

=== TSN-based Wi-Fi ===
TSN-based Wi-Fi is the only reasonable method for guaranteeing reliable, high-speed connectivity for passengers. The TSN itself can be used for multiple applications from passenger connectivity to IoT applications and Communication-Based Train Control (CBTC).

To configure a TSN, a core packet network must be installed across the track. TSN base stations usually operate in unlicensed 5GHz Wi-Fi bands, though other similar bands can be used depending on local regulations. The base stations are installed 250-900m apart and are connected to the core network through fiber or RJ45 ports.

Since the leading solutions by FluidMesh and RADWIN are based on Wi-Fi chipsets, the supported features are relatively similar. However, both use specific proprietary management algorithms to ensure stable hand-over and to increase the average throughput.

To enable connectivity on trains, mobile units or base stations generally should be installed in each head/end car. Since the operating frequency is high, the best way to ensure performance is to install ‘shark’ antennas on top of train cars. Another way is to install flat panel antennas inside the cabin, though contemporary trains usually have metalized glass windows which prevent a 5 GHz signal from passing through at a sufficient signal-to-noise ratio (SNR).

Leading 5 GHz TSN solutions are based on IEEE 802.11ac (WiFi 5) chips and feature more than 800 Mbit/s peak aggregated UL+DL physical throughput with two spatial streams. However, real life throughput is much lower. Achieving actual L2/L3 800 Mbit/s peak throughput in tunnels is only possible with 3 or 4 spatial streams. Unfortunately, it is almost impossible to effectively utilize more than two independent streams in subway environment due to physical constraints of radio signal propagation in tunnels.

== Investment and monetization models for TSN ==
Since LTE-based Wi-Fi is usually a supplemental service provided by a transport operator or a cellular carrier, the common funding model here is direct investment without any monetization.

TSN provides more opportunities for monetization – from passenger Wi-Fi with dramatically better performance than existing LTE networks to IoT services with guaranteed performance for transport operators (CCTV with online access, TV broadcasting, telemetry, CBTC, infotainment, etc.). Therefore, there are cases where private external investments were made into TSN-based passenger Wi-Fi projects such as the Moscow and St. Petersburg metros by Maxima

== See also ==
- Passenger Wi-Fi on airplanes
- Passenger Wi-Fi on trains
