= List of Hawaiian Airlines destinations =

Hawaiian Airlines flies to these destinations as of March 2025:

== List ==
Country	City	Airport	Notes	Refs
American Samoa	Pago Pago	Pago Pago International Airport		
Australia	Brisbane	Brisbane Airport	Terminated	
Australia	Sydney	Sydney Airport		
China	Beijing	Beijing Capital International Airport	Terminated	
Cook Islands	Rarotonga	Rarotonga International Airport		
French Polynesia	Papeete	Faa'a International Airport		
Guam	Hagåtña	Antonio B. Won Pat International Airport	Terminated	
Japan	Fukuoka	Fukuoka Airport	Suspended	
Japan	Osaka	Kansai International Airport		
Japan	Sapporo	New Chitose Airport	Terminated	
Japan	Sendai	Sendai Airport	Terminated	
Japan	Tokyo	Haneda Airport		
Japan	Tokyo	Narita International Airport	Terminated	
New Zealand	Auckland	Auckland Airport	Terminated	
Philippines	Manila	Ninoy Aquino International Airport	Terminated	
Samoa	Apia	Faleolo International Airport	Terminated	
South Korea	Seoul	Incheon International Airport	Suspended	
Taiwan	Taipei	Taoyuan International Airport	Terminated	
United States (Alaska)	Anchorage	Ted Stevens Anchorage International Airport	Transferred to Alaska Airlines	
United States (Arizona)	Phoenix	Phoenix Sky Harbor International Airport		
United States (California)	Long Beach	Long Beach Airport		
United States (California)	Los Angeles	Los Angeles International Airport		
United States (California)	Oakland	Oakland San Francisco Bay Airport		
United States (California)	Sacramento	Sacramento International Airport		
United States (California)	San Diego	San Diego International Airport		
United States (California)	San Francisco	San Francisco International Airport		
United States (California)	San Jose	San Jose International Airport		
United States (Hawaii)	Hilo	Hilo International Airport		
United States (Hawaii)	Honolulu	Daniel K. Inouye International Airport	Hub	
United States (Hawaii)	Kahului	Kahului Airport	Hub	
United States (Hawaii)	Kona	Kona International Airport		
United States (Hawaii)	Lihue	Lihue Airport		
United States (Massachusetts)	Boston	Logan International Airport	Suspended	
United States (Nevada)	Las Vegas	Harry Reid International Airport		
United States (New York)	New York City	John F. Kennedy International Airport		
United States (Oregon)	Portland	Portland International Airport		
United States (Texas)	Austin	Austin-Bergstrom International Airport	Terminated	
United States (Utah)	Salt Lake City	Salt Lake City International Airport	Transferred to Alaska Airlines	
United States (Washington)	Seattle	Seattle–Tacoma International Airport		
