= Hawaiian Airlines =

Airline brand of the United States

Hawaiian Airlines, Inc. Hui Mokulele o Hawaiʻi

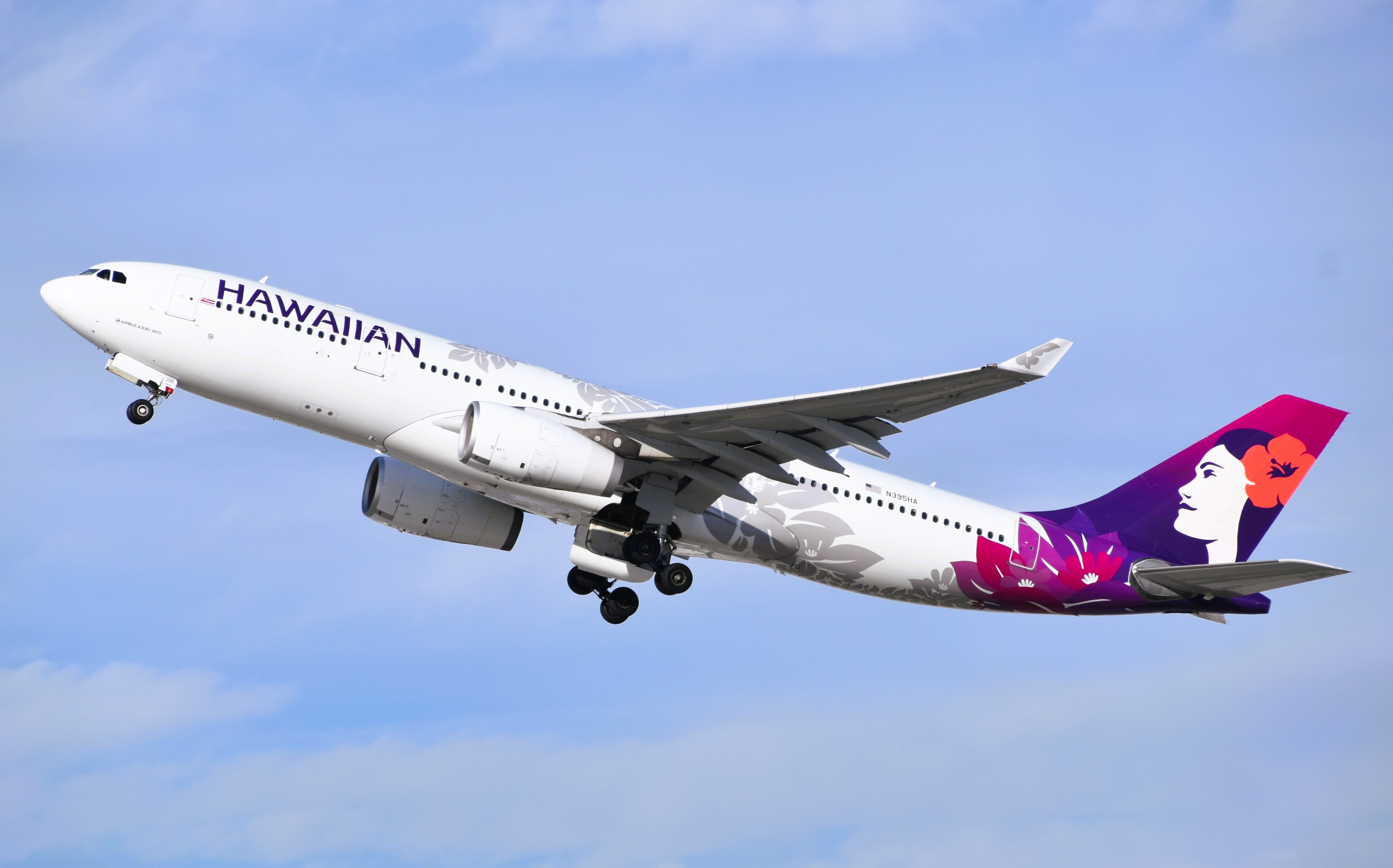
- Hawaiian Airlines Airbus A330
IATA	ICAO	Call sign
AS	ASA	ALASKA
- Founded: January 30, 1929; 97 years ago, as Inter-Island Airways
- Commenced operations: October 6, 1929; 97 years ago
- AOC #: ASAA802A
- Hubs: Honolulu; Kahului
- Frequent-flyer program: Atmos Rewards
- Alliance: Oneworld
- Fleet size: 71
- Destinations: 31
- Parent company: Alaska Air Group
- Headquarters: Honolulu, Hawaii, United States
- Key people: Ben Minicucci (Alaska Air Group CEO); Diana Birkett Rakow (Hawaiian Airlines CEO)
- Founder: Stanley Kennedy Sr.
- Revenue: ▲US$3.3 billion (2025)
- Net income: ▲US$(189) million (2025)
- Total assets: ▲US$4.9 billion (2025)
- Employees: ▼6,456 (2025)
- Website: hawaiianairlines.com

Hawaiian Airlines, Inc. (Hawaiian: Hui Mokulele o Hawaiʻi [huwi mokulele o həˈʋɐjʔi]) is a U.S. commercial airline brand headquartered in Honolulu and a wholly owned subsidiary of the Alaska Air Group. Between 1929 and 2025, it operated as an independent carrier and was the largest operator of commercial flights to and from the island state of Hawaiʻi, and the tenth largest commercial airline in the United States by passengers carried.

Operating from its primary hub at Daniel K. Inouye International Airport on Oʻahu and a secondary hub at Kahului Airport on Maui, the airline provided inter-island flights within Hawaiʻi, routes to other Pacific island destinations, including American Samoa and Tahiti, service to Alaska and the U.S. mainland, and international connections to Australia, Canada, Japan, New Zealand and South Korea.

Hawaiian was the oldest American carrier that never had a fatal accident or a hull loss and consistently ranked as the nation's most punctual airline. It also led in reliability metrics, including the fewest cancellations, overbookings, and baggage handling issues.

Alaska Air Group announced plans to acquire Hawaiian Airlines on December 3, 2023, and completed the merger on September 18, 2024, following regulatory approval. Hawaiian's final flight as an independent carrier took place on October 29, 2025, after which its operations were integrated into Alaska Airlines.

== History ==
=== Early years (1929–1984) ===
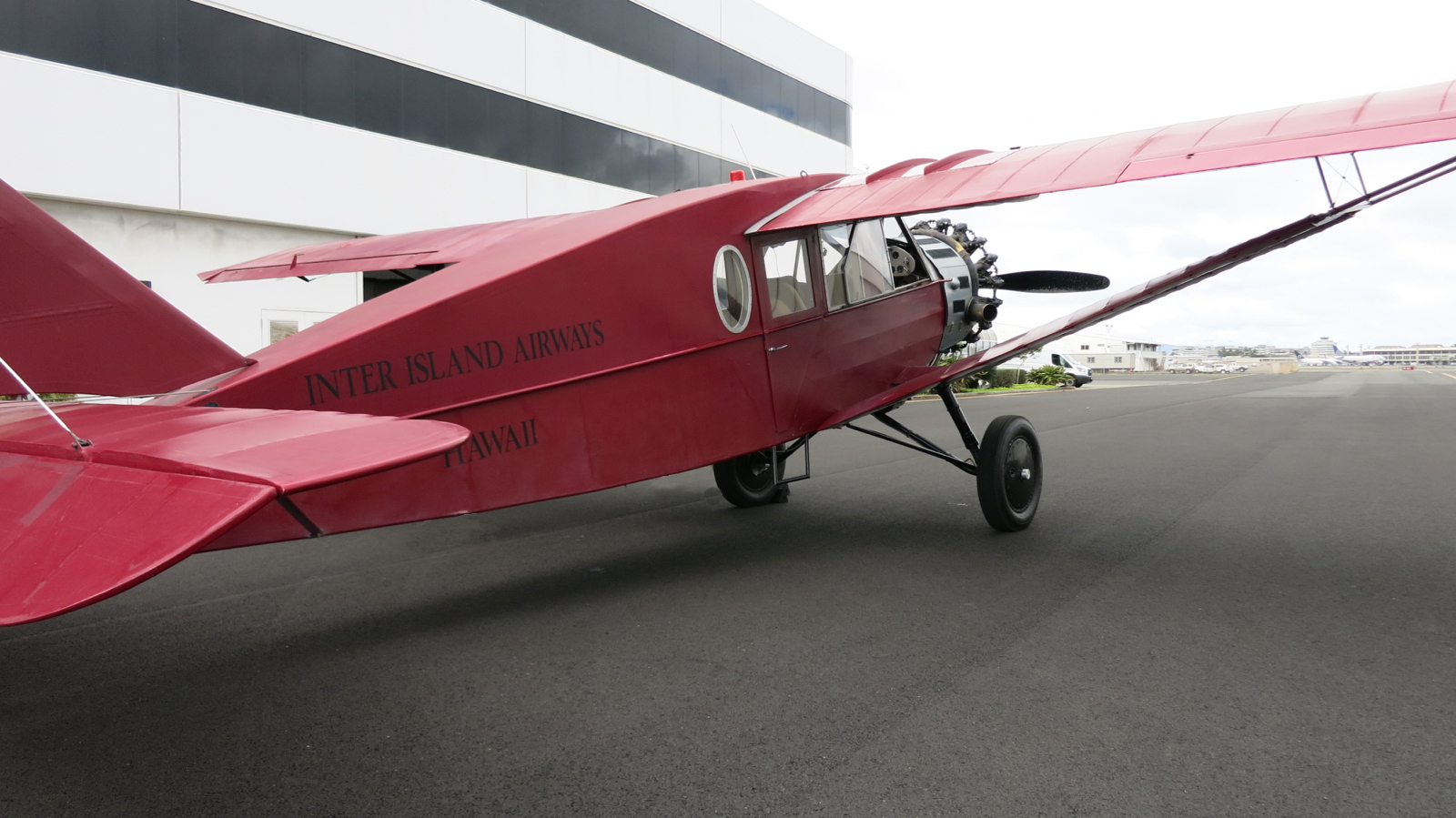
Hawaiian Airlines initiated air service in 1929 as Inter-Island Airways with this Bellanca CH-300, restored in 2009 by Hawaiian to flying condition.

Inter-Island Airways (Hawaiian: Hui Mokulele Piliʻāina), the forerunner of the airline which is now known as Hawaiian Airlines, was incorporated on January 30, 1929. Inter-Island Airways, a subsidiary of Inter-Island Steam Navigation Company, began operations on October 6, 1929, with a Bellanca CH-300 Pacemaker, providing short sightseeing flights over Oʻahu. Scheduled service began a month later on November 11 using Sikorsky S-38s with a flight from Honolulu to Hilo, via intermediary stops on Molokaʻi and Maui.

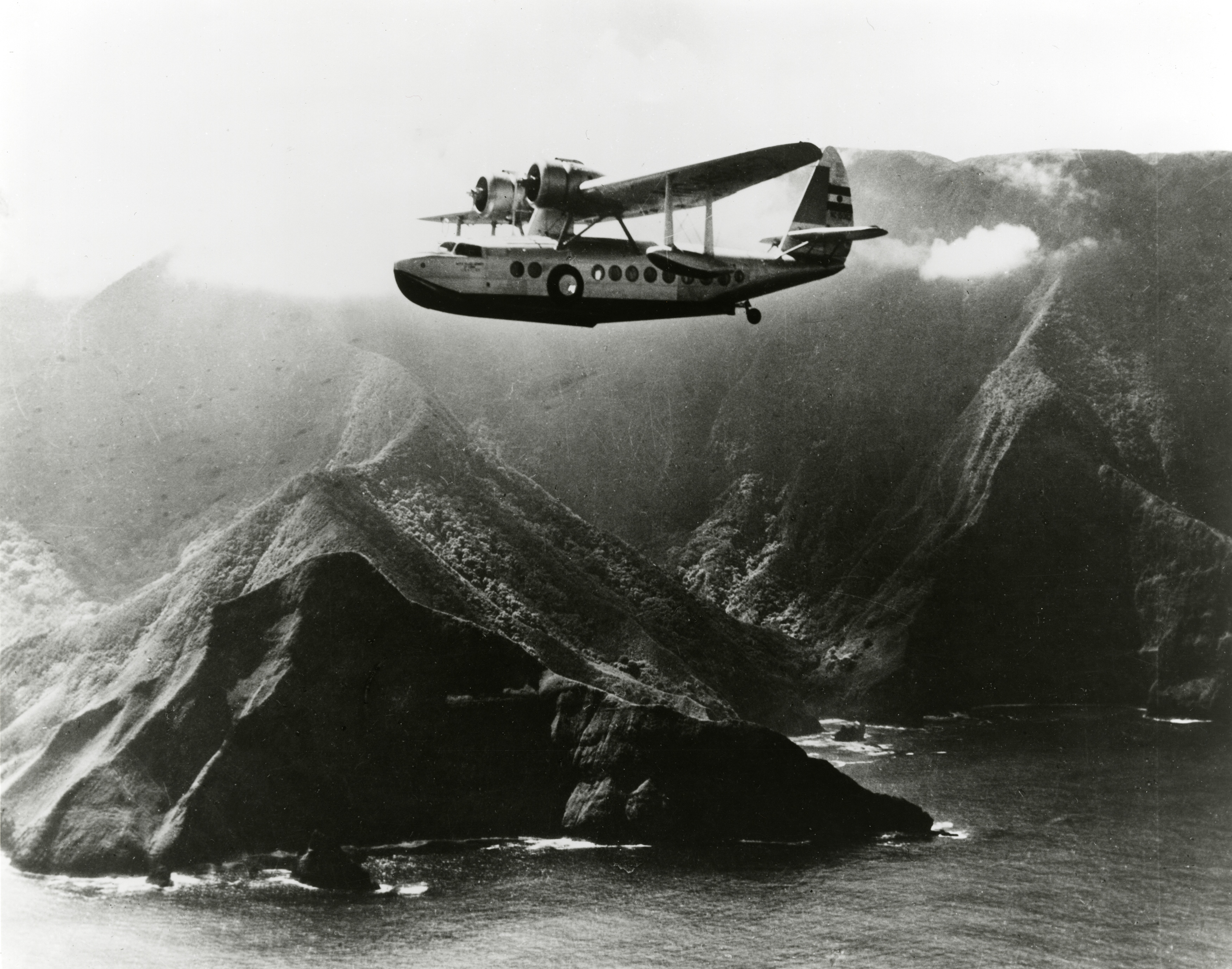
Inter-Islands Airways Sikorsky S-43 in flight close to Molokai

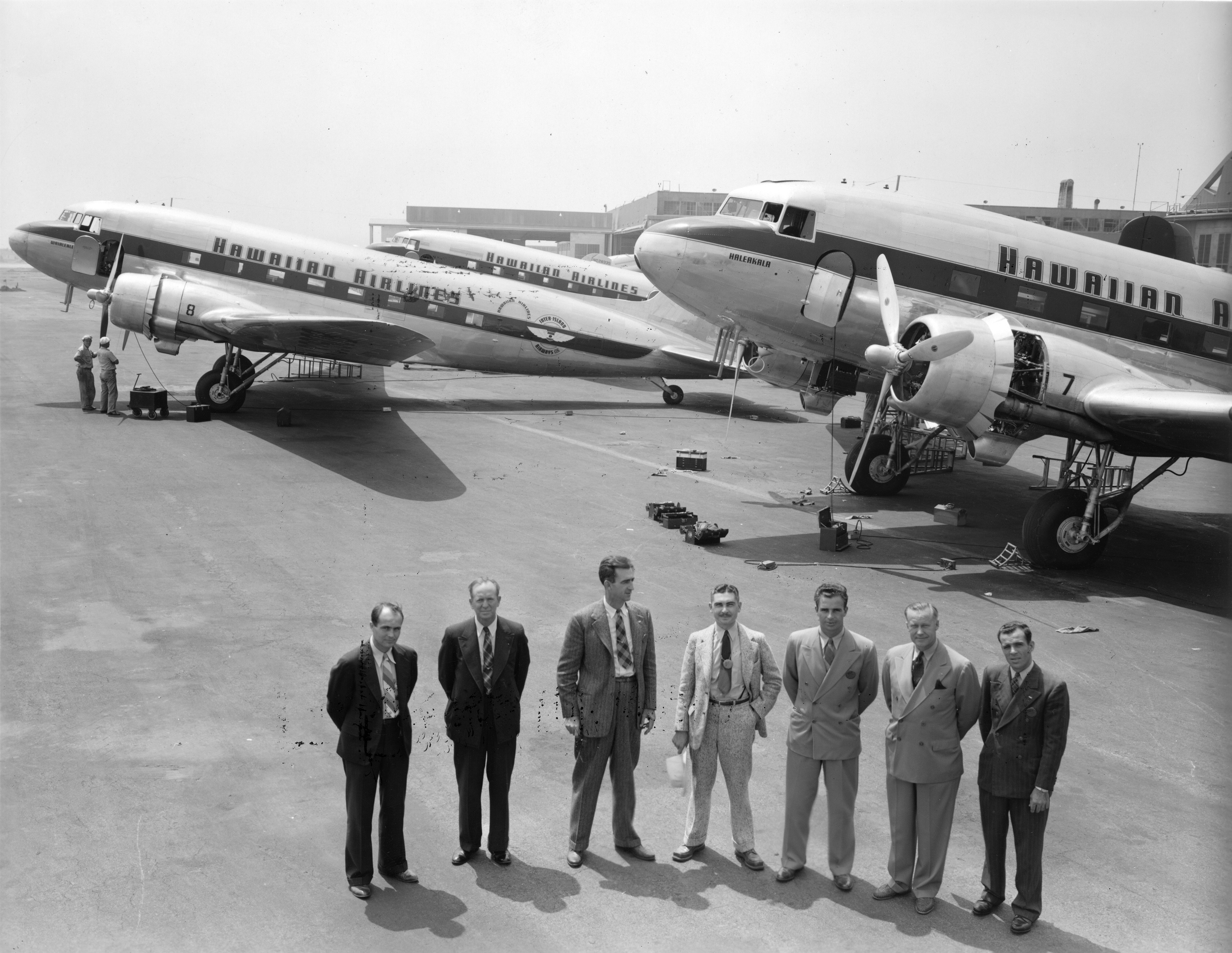
Hawaiian Airlines takes delivery of Douglas DC-3s in Santa Monica, California, August 1941

On October 1, 1941, the company's name was changed to Hawaiian Airlines when the company phased out the older Sikorsky S-38 and Sikorsky S-43 flying boats. The first Douglas DC-3s were added to the fleet in August 1941, some examples remaining in operation until their final retirement in November 1968.

Modern pressurized equipment was introduced in 1952 in the form of the Convair 340. Further Convair 440s were added from 1959 to 1960, most of the Convairs being converted to turbine propeller power from 1965 to 1967. The last were sold in 1974.

Hawaiian Airlines started to offer jet service in 1966 with the acquisition of Douglas DC-9-10 aircraft, which cut travel times in half on most of its routes.

From 1973 onwards, the airline's logo featured the face of Miss Hawaii 1964, Leina'ala Drummond, who had been a flight attendant with the airline.

=== Hawaiian Air Cargo ===
From 1976 to 1977 and again from 1978 to 1980, Hawaiian had a mainland air cargo division called Hawaiian Air Cargo based in Macon, Georgia, focused on the United States Air Force Logair domestic cargo program. Hawaiian used Lockheed L-188 Electra freighter aircraft. The airline won an Air Force contract for 1976–1977, but then lost the lease of the aircraft it was using and was unable to bid for 1977–1978. In 1978, Hawaiian tried once more with a new batch of aircraft. Hawaiian Air Cargo operated again 1978–1980, when Hawaiian sold the operation to Zantop International Airlines.

=== Growth outside Hawaii (1984–1994) ===
Hawaiian Airlines began to expand its footprint throughout the 1980s as the result of intense competition on inter-island routes created by the entrance of Mid Pacific Air into the market. In 1985, the company began its first foray outside the inter-island market through charter services to the South Pacific and then throughout the rest of the Pacific using Douglas DC-8 aircraft. Despite the early successes of this new business, Hawaiian was forced to curtail its charter services when the Federal Government banned all DC-8 and B707 aircraft without hush kits from operating within the US. Hawaiian did, however, manage to gain a short exemption for its South Pacific services.

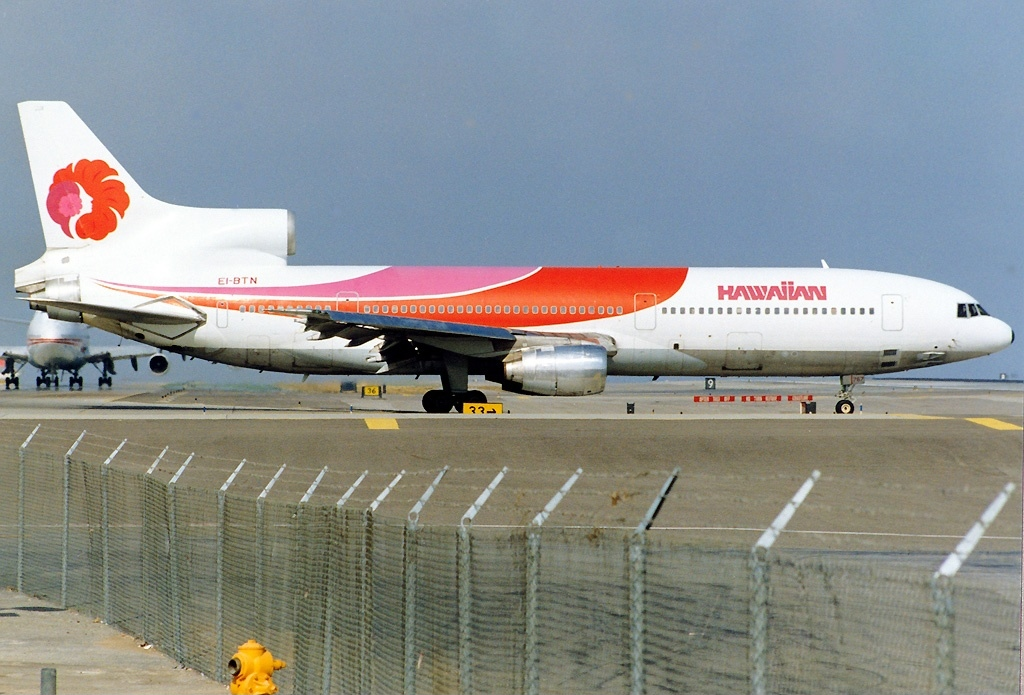
Lockheed L-1011 TriStar displaying the livery introduced in 1975.

Soon after, in early 1985, the company received the first two of its leased Lockheed L-1011 TriStars. One aircraft was used to launch Hawaiian's first scheduled operation out of Hawaiʻi: daily Honolulu-Los Angeles services. This new service put Hawaiian in direct competition with the major US air carriers for the first time in its history. Throughout 1985 and 1986, Hawaiian Airlines added additional L-1011s to its fleet and used them to open up services to other West Coast gateway cities such as San Francisco, Seattle, Portland, Las Vegas, and Anchorage, which placed Hawaiian in further competition against the major US airlines.

Hawaiian Airlines also entered the new international markets of Australia and New Zealand in 1986 with one-stop services through Pago Pago International Airport. Hawaiian also aggressively grew its international charter business and pursued military transport contracts. This led to a large growth in the company's revenues and caused its inter-island service's share of revenues to shrink to just about a third of the company's total.

During the 1980s, Hawaiian also embarked on the development and construction of Kapalua Airport on the west side of Maui. Opened in 1987, the airport was designed with a 3,000-foot runway (910 m), which constrained its ability to handle large aircraft. As a result, when the airport first opened, Hawaiian Airlines was the only inter-island carrier with aircraft capable of serving the airport. With its de Havilland Canada DHC-7 Dash 7 turboprops, Hawaiian had a distinct competitive advantage in the Maui market.

Heading into the 1990s, Hawaiian Airlines faced financial difficulties, racking up millions of dollars in losses throughout the previous three years. Due to the airline's increasingly unprofitable operations, it filed for Chapter 11 bankruptcy protection in September 1993. During this time, the company reduced many of its costs: reorganizing its debt, wrestling concessions from employees, cutting overcapacity, and streamlining its fleet by disposing of many of the planes it had added to its fleet just a few years earlier.

As part of Hawaiian's restructuring, it sold Kapalua Airport to the State of Hawaii in 1993. Hawaiian soon after discontinued service to the airport as it retired its Dash 7 fleet. The retirement of the Dash 7 in 1994 also resulted in the airline operating a more streamlined all-jet fleet as it exited bankruptcy in September 1994.

=== All jet fleet (1994–2003) ===
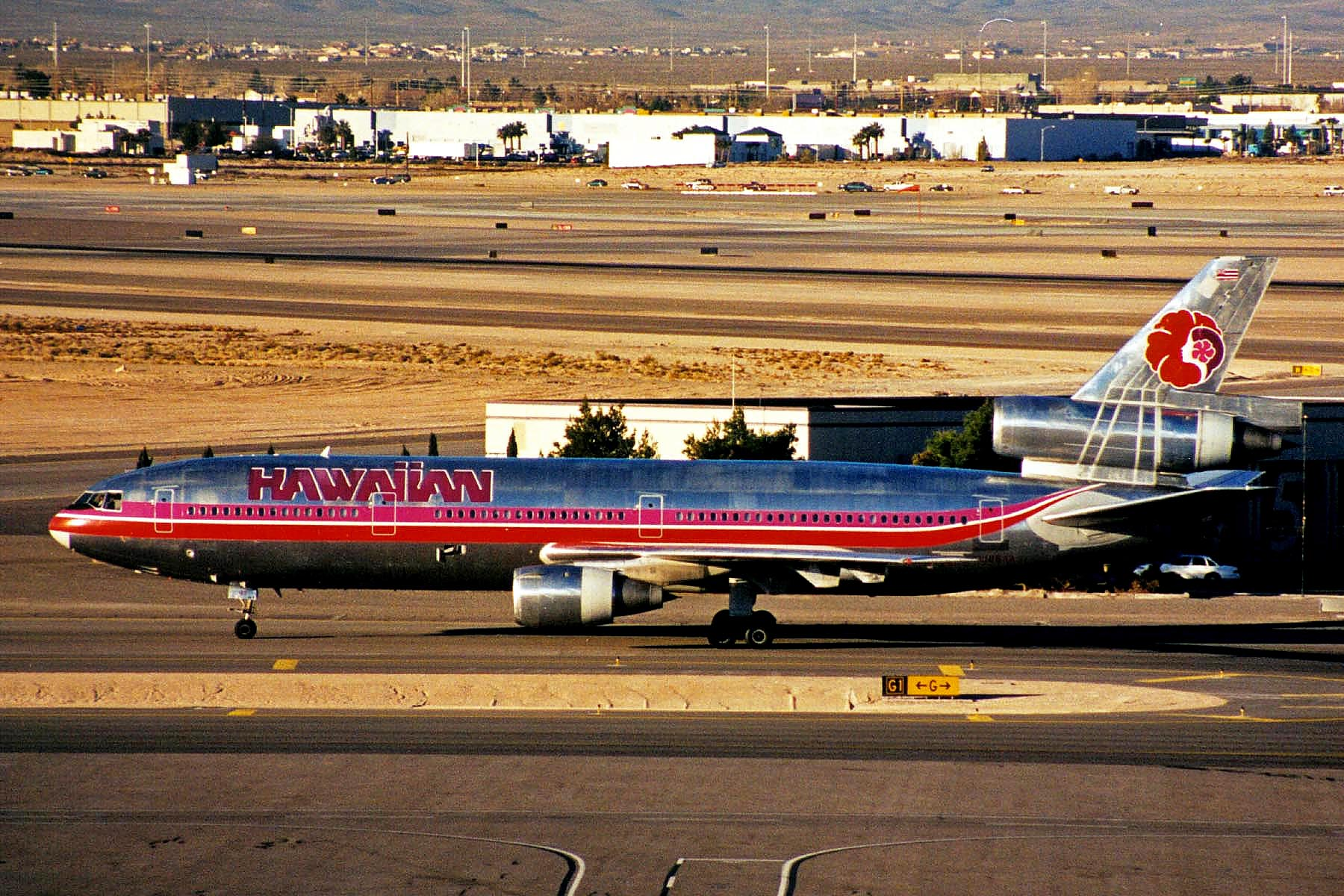
Hawaiian introduced the McDonnell Douglas DC-10 to replace its Lockheed L-1011 TriStar jets.

To replace its retired DC-8s and L-1011s, Hawaiian Airlines leased six DC-10s from American Airlines, who continued to provide maintenance on the aircraft. An agreement with American also included participation in American's SABRE reservation system and participation in American Airlines' AAdvantage frequent flyer program. The DC-10s were subsequently retired between 2002 and 2003. The company replaced these leased DC-10s with 14 leased Boeing 767 aircraft during a fleet modernization program that also replaced its DC-9s with new Boeing 717 aircraft. The Boeing aircraft featured an updated rendition of the company's "Pualani" tail art, which had appeared on its Douglas aircraft since the 1970s. A new design was updated by a local artist Mauriel Morejon. Pualani, which means "flower of the sky," the key icon of Hawaiian's brand for more than four decades, continues to feature on the tail of the aircraft; beneath her, a silver maile lei with woven pakalana flower wraps around the fuselage.

In October 2002, Hawaiian began service to Phoenix Sky Harbor airport with its Boeing 767–300 aircraft.

=== Second bankruptcy and reorganization (2003–2005) ===
In March 2003, Hawaiian Airlines filed for Chapter 11 bankruptcy protection for the second time in its history. The airline continued its normal operations, and at the time was overdue for $4.5 million worth of payments to the pilots' pension plan. Within the company, it was suggested that the plan be terminated. As of May 2005, Hawaiian Airlines had received court approval for its reorganization plan. The company emerged from bankruptcy protection on June 2, 2005, with reduced operating costs through renegotiated contracts with its union work groups; restructured aircraft leases; and investment from RC Aviation, a unit of San Diego–based Ranch Capital, which bought a majority share in parent company Hawaiian Holdings Inc in 2004.

=== Post-bankruptcy (2005–2012) ===
On September 28, 2005, Hawaiian Airlines began nonstop daily flights from Honolulu to San Jose, California. This made San Jose the fifth gateway city in California to be serviced by Hawaiian; the others were Los Angeles, San Diego, Sacramento, and San Francisco.

On May 4, 2006, Hawaiian Airlines expanded service between the US mainland and Hawaii in anticipation of the induction of four additional Boeing 767–300 aircraft, primarily focused on expanding non-stop service to Kahului Airport from San Diego, Seattle, and Portland. Additional flights were also added between Honolulu and the cities of Sacramento, Seattle, and Los Angeles. In 2006, Hawaiian Airlines was rated as the best carrier serving Hawaii by Travel + Leisure, Zagat and Condé Nast Traveler.

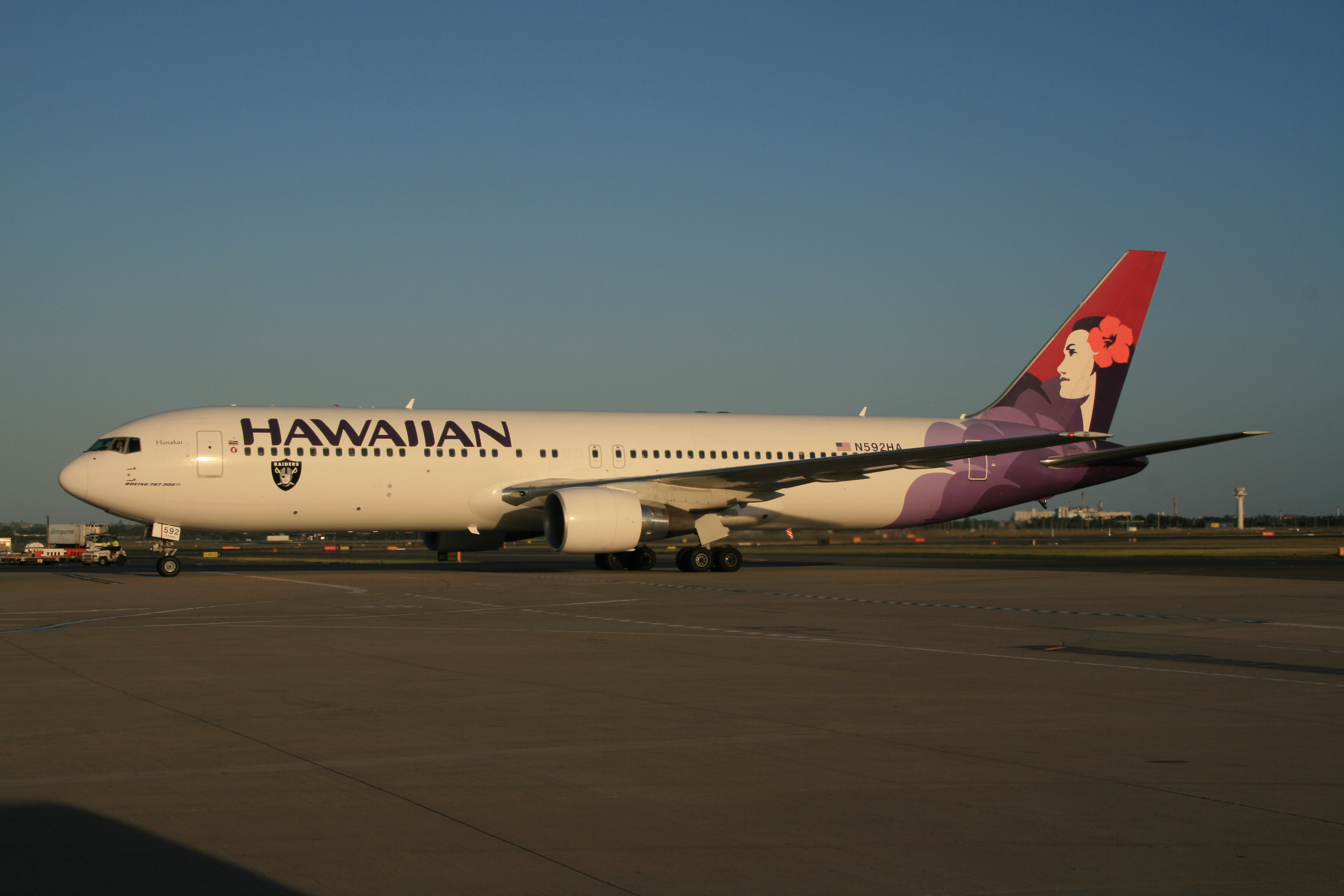
Hawaiian added the Oakland Raiders logo on the forward fuselage of this Boeing 767-300ER, christened Hunakai, to commemorate its partnership with the team.

On July 24, 2007, Hawaiian Airlines and Air New Zealand signed a $45 million contract for Air New Zealand to perform heavy maintenance on Hawaiian's Boeing 767 aircraft. This contract lasted for five years. Air New Zealand stated that this opportunity will also give a chance for them to build their expertise working on 767s. In August 2007, the Seattle Seahawks became the second sports team to begin using Hawaiian Airlines to travel to games. The Las Vegas Raiders, also of the NFL, have been flying Hawaiian Airlines since the 1990s. The two teams formerly flew on Hawaiian's Boeing 767s to and from all their games, but now travel on Hawaiian's Airbus A330s. Several of Hawaiian's Boeing 767 and A330 aircraft have been fitted with decals of logos of the Raiders.

In March 2008, the airline launched nonstop flights to Manila, capital of Philippines, in the airline's first major international expansion since it emerged from bankruptcy protection in June 2005. In response to the closure of ATA Airlines and Aloha Airlines, the airline began flights to Oakland on May 1, 2008.

On February 16, 2010, Hawaiian Airlines sought approval from the United States Department of Transportation to begin nonstop flights from its hub at Honolulu to Tokyo-Haneda sometime in 2010. The airline was one of five US carriers – the others being Delta Air Lines, Continental Airlines, United Airlines and American Airlines — seeking approval to serve Haneda as part of the U.S.-Japan OpenSkies agreement. Approval was granted from USDOT to begin nonstop service to Haneda, Japan. The flight began service on November 18, 2010. In addition, the airline established a codeshare agreement with All Nippon Airways that lasted until March 2018.

On January 12, 2011, Hawaiian Airlines began nonstop service to Seoul-Incheon, South Korea. On March 31, 2011, Hawaiian announced that they will be renovating the check-in lobby of the inter-island terminal at the Honolulu International Airport (Hawaiian's main hub). Hawaiian, the only occupant of the inter-island terminal, will be removing the traditional check-in counter, to install six circular check-in islands in the middle of the lobbies. Those check-in islands can be used for inter-island, mainland, and international flights. On July 12, 2011, Hawaiian added Osaka, Japan to its network. On November 17, 2011, Hawaiian ordered five additional Airbus A330-200 aircraft.

On June 4, 2012, Hawaiian expanded to the east coast with daily flights to New York's John F. Kennedy International Airport. On August 30, 2012, Hawaiian filed an application with the U.S. Department of Transportation for a nonstop route between Kona and Tokyo-Haneda. This would fill a void that Japan Airlines left when it ceased service to Kona nearly two years earlier. However, the US Department of Transportation rejected the airline's application to begin service. On December 3, 2012, the airline unveiled plans to begin flights to Taipei, Taiwan, beginning July 9, 2013, as part of its aggressive expansion plans.

=== Further expansion and new subsidiary carrier (2013–2023) ===
On February 11, 2013, the airline announced a new venture in the turboprop inter-island business, "'Ohana by Hawaiian". The service is operated by Empire Airlines using ATR 42–500 turboprop airplanes. The service began on March 11, 2014, to Molokaʻi and Lānaʻi. The airline expanded more "ʻOhana by Hawaiian" routes between Kahului, Kailua-Kona and Hilo during the summer of 2014. On April 10, 2013, the airline announced its first destination in China, with service to Beijing expected to start on April 16, 2014, pending government approval. At the same time, the airline announced that it would end service to Manila on July 31, 2013. On July 11, 2013, the airline signed a codeshare agreement with China Airlines.

On March 12, 2014, Hawaiian announced that it would begin daily service between Kahului and Los Angeles on May 2, adding a second flight from June 30 to September 8 in response to passenger demand. It would also begin nonstop summer service between Los Angeles and both Līhuʻe, Kauaʻi, and Kona, Hawaiʻi. On August 14, 2014, the airline announced direct service between Kahului and San Francisco beginning in November.

On January 5, 2015, Hawaiian refiled its previously rejected application with the U.S. Department of Transportation (DOT) for the Kona-Haneda route with service, if approved, to begin in June. The request was prompted by a DOT decision in December 2014 to review the public interest in Delta Air Lines' Seattle-Tokyo route after Delta reduced the frequency of those flights from daily to seasonal. On March 31, DOT again denied the request, opting instead to allow Delta to continue operating the route, with American Airlines taking over if Delta's planned service continued to fail.

On May 1, 2017, the airline revealed a new logo and livery for its aircraft.

On March 6, 2018, the airline announced an order for 10 Boeing 787–9 Dreamliners with options for an additional ten; selecting GE GEnx engines. An order for an additional two 787-9 aircraft was announced on January 4, 2023, converted from existing options.

Due to the economic effects of the COVID-19 pandemic, Hawaiian Airlines reported a net loss of over $100 million for the Q2 of 2020.

Fourteen-day travel quarantines, which were reinstated for August 2020 have also contributed to Hawaiian Airlines' plans to downsize the company by 15–25% by summer 2021.

On May 27, 2021, Hawaiian announced that it would discontinue the 'Ohana by Hawaiian brand and its cargo and passenger services after the pandemic and resulting quarantine significantly impacted inter-island travel. The interruptions in service forced the airline to reconsider the viability of the operation and determine it was no longer feasible. The carrier's ATR fleet would be moved to the mainland and be prepared for sale.

On April 25, 2022, Hawaiian Airlines announced they will become the first major air carrier to offer the SpaceX Starlink service on all transpacific flights. The service will be offered free to passengers beginning in 2023. In September 2024, Hawaiian announced it had installed Starlink on its Airbus fleet.

=== Acquisition by Alaska Air Group (2023–present) ===
In December 2023, Alaska Airlines announced that it would merge with Hawaiian Airlines by purchasing it for $1.9 billion in cash along with an assumption of approximately $900 million in outstanding debt. Airline industry analysts had promoted the merger for years which would create a combined carrier focused on the western United States. The merger would provide Alaska, which is primarily a domestic carrier with narrowbody aircraft, with Hawaiian's widebody jets, pilots, and international networks.

The merger would retain both Alaska Airlines and Hawaiian Airlines as separate brands; Hawaiian Airlines would also become a Oneworld member. The proposed merger was approved by shareholders of Hawaiian Airlines in April 2024, following earlier approval from both Alaska Air Group and Hawaiian Holdings, Inc.

Under the Biden administration, the U.S. Department of Justice had worked to prevent further consolidation in the airline industry, so it was initially unclear whether the department would file suit against the merger, with analysts noting differences between the proposal and prior proposals opposed by the administration. The main area of regulatory concern was likely that the deal would put about 40% of the traffic between Hawaii and the mainland U.S. in one company's hands. When the deal was announced, company executives expected approval from the Justice Department to take between a year and 18 months. On August 19, 2024, the U.S. Department of Justice completed its regulatory antitrust review of the proposed acquisition and declined to attempt to block the merger in court. On September 17, 2024, the regulator from the U.S. Department of Transportation approved the merger, with conditions including the one-to-one exchange rate for airline points, maintenance of "robust levels" of inter-island passenger and cargo flights, continued service to rural Hawaiian communities, the permission for children under the age of thirteen to sit next to accompanying adults regardless of their tickets, as well as lowered costs for military members and their families.

At the time, the companies overlapped on 12 nonstop routes which they described as minimal. Alaska Airlines emphasized its experience operating an intra-Alaska network including service to 16 destinations not reachable by road while pledging to maintain a robust inter-island schedule in Hawaii to neighbor islands. The Wall Street Journal speculated that consolidation would lead to higher prices for consumers on flights to Hawaii although this was disputed by the companies.

When the merger was announced, Gov. Josh Green (HI) promised that he and the attorney general Anne Lopez would monitor the merger "very closely" adding that both "are very high-quality companies, but ultimately, I will be watching to make sure all of our state's needs are met and all of our workers are cared for." As part of its effort to garner local support for the merger, Alaska Airlines made three key promises to Hawaii residents to maintain the Hawaiian Airlines brand, keep all front-line union employees, and protect neighbor island flights. In February 2024, Richard Bissen (mayor of Maui County), Rick Blangiardi (mayor of the City and County of Honolulu), Derek Kawakami (mayor of Kauai County), and Mitch Roth (mayor of Hawaiʻi County) published an open letter in the Honolulu Star-Advertiser declaring their support for the merger as "good for Hawaiʻi" and enhance service to neighbor islands.

On September 18, 2024, Alaska Air Group completed the acquisition of Hawaiian Holdings, Inc. The company announced in August 2025 that HawaiianMiles and Alaska's MilagePlan would be replaced by a new frequent-flyer program called Atmos Rewards. The last day to redeem HawaiianMiles was set for September 25, with all remaining miles rolled over to Atmos Rewards by October 1.

On October 29, 2025, Hawaiian Airlines adopted Alaska Airlines' ICAO airline designator 'ASA' and call sign 'ALASKA' upon receiving a single air operator's certificate (AOC) from the Federal Aviation Administration (FAA). The final flight using Hawaiian's ICAO designator 'HAL' and call sign 'HAWAIIAN' was flight HA866 from Pago Pago to Honolulu. Alaska Air Group continues to use the Hawaiian Airlines brand for flights to, from, and within Hawaii; these are operated by Alaska Airlines and marketed as 'operated by Alaska as Hawaiian Airlines'. On April 22, 2026, the integration to a single passenger service system was completed, enabling all Hawaiian-branded flights to transition from their original IATA designator 'HA' to Alaska's 'AS'.

On April 23, 2026, Hawaiian Airlines joined Oneworld as an affiliate member of Alaska Airlines.

== Corporate affairs ==
=== Ownership and structure ===
The parent company of Hawaiian Airlines, Inc., is Alaska Air Group. Hawaiian Holdings, Inc., was previously listed on NASDAQ from June 2, 2008, to September 18, 2024, and before was listed on the American Stock Exchange. Hawaiian Holdings, Inc., was a holding company whose primary asset was the sole ownership of all issued and outstanding shares of common stock of Hawaiian Airlines, Inc. On June 30, 2008, the company announced that it had been added to the Russell 3000 Index.

=== Executive leadership ===
In 2025, chief executive officer Joe Sprague announced his retirement. Beginning in October of the same year, Diana Birkett Rakow succeeded Sprague as CEO of the company.

=== Business trends ===
Recent key figures for Hawaiian Holdings, Inc. (which include the operations of Hawaiian Airlines and former regional subsidiary carrier ʻOhana by Hawaiian), are shown below (for years ending December 31):

Year	Revenue (in million US$)	Net income (in million US$)	Employees (FTE)	Passengers (in millions)	Load factor (%)	Aircraft	Notes/ references
2014	2,315	69	5,380	10.2	81.5	50	
2015	2,317	182	5,548	10.7	81.6	54	
2016	2,432	224	6,199	11.1	84.3	57	
2017	2,675	331	6,660	11.5	85.9	60	
2018	2,837	233	7,244	11.8	85.3	66	
2019	2,832	224	7,437	11.7	86.6	68	
2020	844	(511)	5,278	3.4	60.6	68	
2021	1,596	(145)	6,674	6.5	69.2	69	
2022	2,716	(240)	7,108	10.0	80.1	64	
2023	2,641	(261)	7,362	10.9	83.5	62	

== Destinations ==
Hawaiian Airlines serves destinations in several Asia-Pacific countries and territories. The airline added its eighth international destination, Incheon International Airport near Seoul, South Korea, on January 12, 2011. It also has daily and weekly direct, nonstop international flights from Honolulu to Tahiti, Australia, South Korea, Japan, and New Zealand.

=== Codeshare agreements ===
Hawaiian Airlines is a member of the Oneworld alliance and has codeshares or mileage partnerships with the following airlines:

- Aer Lingus
- Air Tahiti Nui
- Alaska Airlines
- Aleutian Airways
- American Airlines
- Bahamasair
- British Airways
- Cape Air
- Cathay Pacific
- Condor
- Contour Airlines
- Fiji Airways
- Finnair
- Hainan Airlines
- Iberia
- Icelandair
- Japan Airlines
- Kenmore Air
- Korean Air
- Malaysia Airlines
- Mokulele Airlines
- Oman Air
- Philippine Airlines
- Porter Airlines
- Qantas
- Qatar Airways
- Royal Air Maroc
- Royal Jordanian
- Southern Airways Express
- SriLankan Airlines
- Starlux Airlines

=== Cargo Interline agreements ===
Hawaiian has a cargo interline agreement with Southwest Airlines.

== Fleet ==
As of March 2026, Hawaiian Airlines' fleet consists of the following aircraft, all of which are operated by Alaska Airlines:

Hawaiian Airlines fleet
Aircraft	In service	Orders	Passengers					Refs	Notes
Aircraft	In service	Orders	J	W/F	Y+	Y	Total	Refs	Notes
Mainline passenger fleet
Airbus A321neo	18	—	—	16	44	129	189		
Airbus A330-200	24	—	18	—	68	192	278		Aircraft to have cabins retrofitted starting in 2028.
Airbus A330-200	24	—	22	28	48	156	254		New configuration with Leihōkū Suites starting 2028.
Boeing 717-200	19	—	—	8	—	120	128		To be retired and replaced by Boeing 737-800 transferred from Alaska Airlines beginning in 2028.
Cargo fleet
Airbus A330-300P2F	10	—	Cargo						Operated for Amazon Air.
Total	71	—							

The airline names its Boeing 717 aircraft after birds found in Polynesia, its Airbus A321neo fleet after plants and forests within the Hawaiian islands, and its Airbus A330 aircraft after Polynesian constellations historically used to navigate to the Hawaiian islands.

=== Boeing 717 ===
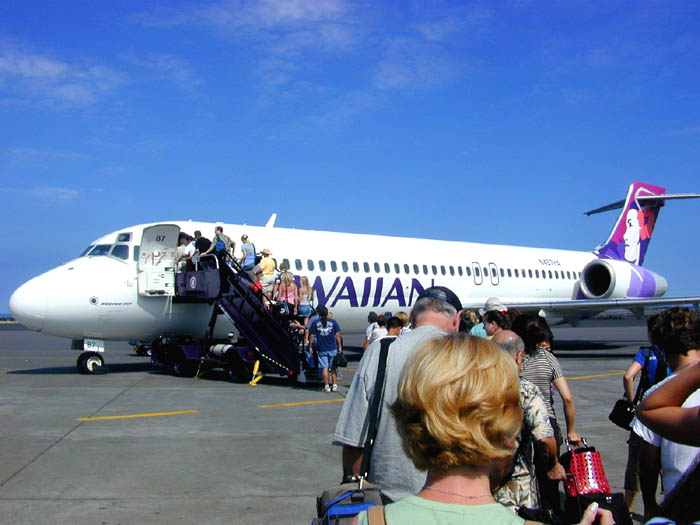
Passengers board a Hawaiian Boeing 717-200 at Kona International Airport for an inter-island flight.

Hawaiian began operating 13 Boeing 717 aircraft on its inter-island network in March 2001. On June 4, 2008, the airline announced plans to lease four additional 717s to meet increased demand following the shutdown of Aloha Airlines' passenger operations and the closure of ATA Airlines. Deliveries were scheduled between September and the end of 2008.

=== Airbus A321neo ===
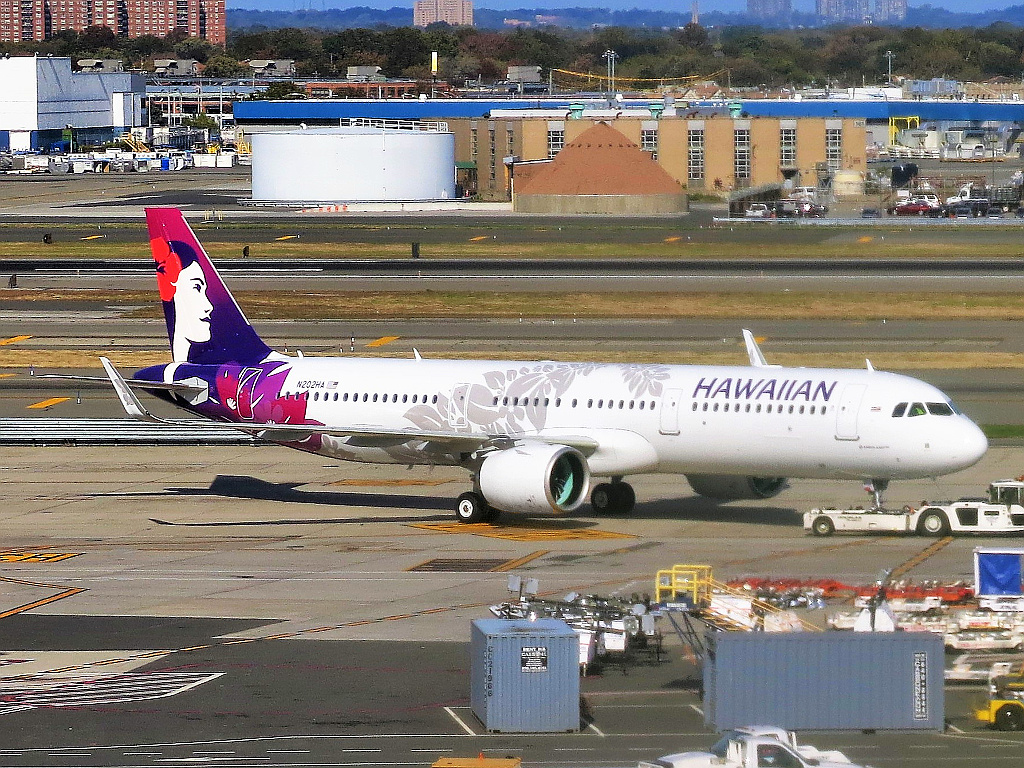
Hawaiian's first Airbus A321neo, christened Maile, at John F. Kennedy International Airport in New York City, halfway through its delivery flight.

In January 2013, Hawaiian ordered 16 A321neo aircraft, with options for up to nine more. The type is operated in a two-class, 189-seat configuration. After reaching labor agreements with its pilot and flight attendant unions, Hawaiian finalized the order in March 2013. In December 2016, the airline announced it would lease two additional A321neos, bringing the total to 18. The type entered service on January 17, 2018, with a flight from Kahului to Oakland, California.

=== Airbus A330-200 ===
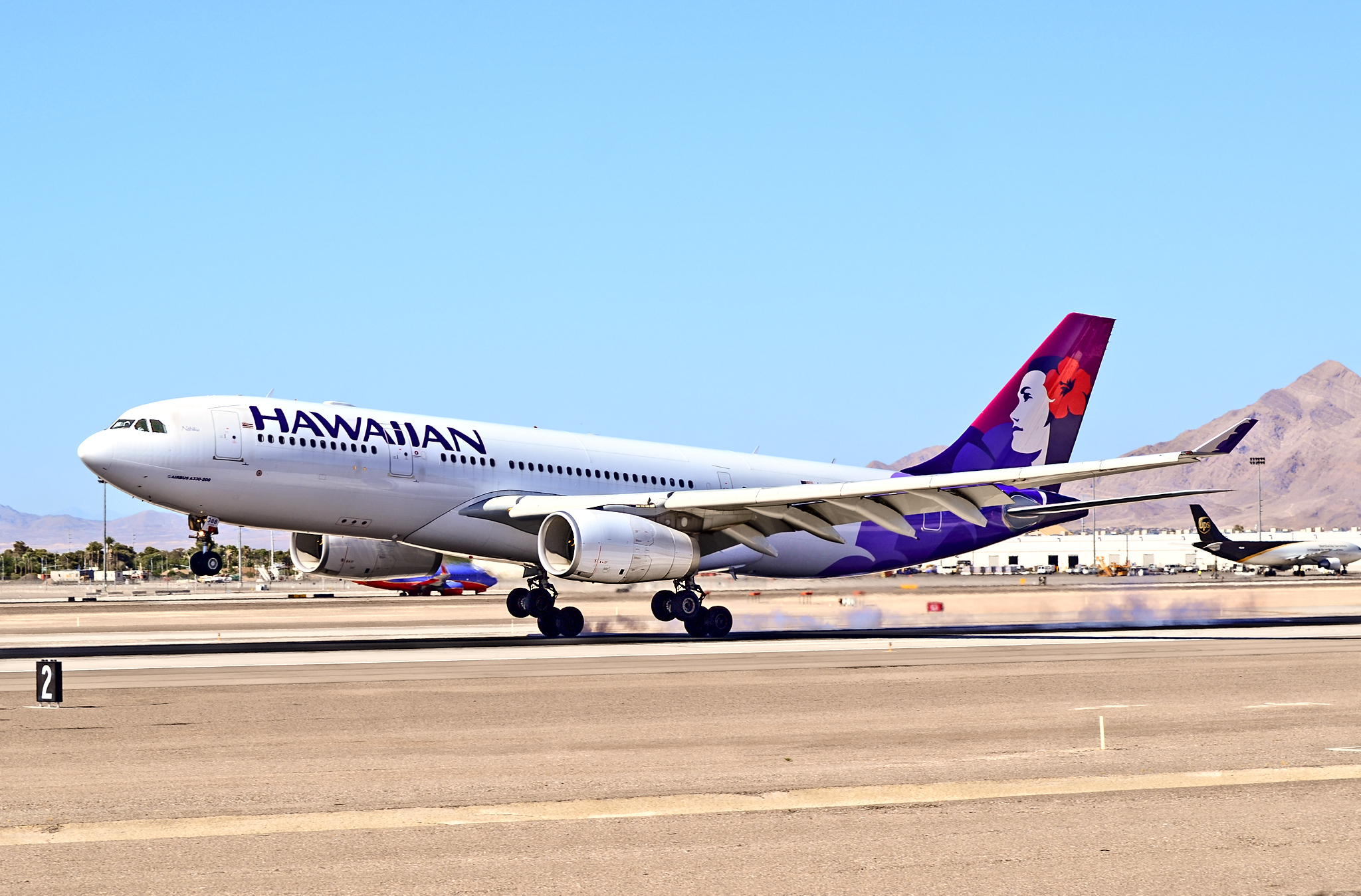
Hawaiian Airbus A330-200, christened Nahiku, touching down at Harry Reid International Airport in Las Vegas.

On November 27, 2007, Hawaiian ordered 24 long-range from Airbus aircraft valued at $4.4 billion. The order included six Airbus A330-200s with six options, and six A350-800s with six options. A330 deliveries began in 2010, while the first A350 was scheduled for 2017. Following the announcement that Airbus would cancel the A350-800 to focus on the larger A350 variants, Hawaiian converted its order to six Airbus A330-800 aircraft, a reengined version of the A330-200. However, Hawaiian would ultimately be the only buyer of the type, leading the company to decide to cancel its order.

Ahead of the new deliveries, Hawaiian announced in October 2008 that it would lease two additional A330-200s beginning in 2011, while extending the leases of two Boeing 767-300ERs to bridge the transition. Two weeks later, the airline added another leased A330-200 for delivery in 2010, while moving up an earlier delivery. Additional orders and leases followed, including six A330-200s in December 2010 (bringing the total to 15), and multiple leasing agreements with Air Lease Corporation, Hong Kong Aviation Capital, and Jackson Square Aviation. By 2015, the A330-200 fleet had grown to 22 aircraft. Additional purchases and leases were announced through 2016.

=== Historical fleet ===
Throughout its history, Hawaiian Airlines has operated a diverse range of aircraft including the following:

Aircraft	Introduced	Retired	Notes
ATR 42	2014	2021	Operated by former regional subsidiary carrier ʻOhana by Hawaiian for inter-island service. Retired for sale after discontinuation of brand.
Beechcraft Model 18	1947	Unknown	Used for charter flights and pilot training.
Bellanca CH-300 Pacemaker	1929	1933	Original aircraft. Re-acquired in 2009 and restored to 1929 condition.
Boeing 767-300	2006	2018	Operated flights from Hawaii to the mainland in the United States. Replaced by Airbus A330-200, Airbus A321neo and Boeing 787-9.
Boeing 767-300ER	2001	2019	Operated flights from Hawaii to the mainland in the United States. Replaced by Airbus A330-200, Airbus A321neo and Boeing 787-9.
Boeing 787-9	2024	2026	Transferred to Alaska Airlines.
Convair CV-340	1953	1973	Convair CV-640 was also operated from the mid 1960s, powered by turboprop engines.
de Havilland Canada DHC-7 Dash 7	1981	1994	STOL capable aircraft.
Douglas DC-3	1941	1966	
Douglas DC-6	1958	1969	
Douglas DC-8-60	1983	1993	DC-8-62 and DC-8-63 aircraft.
Lockheed L-188 Electra	1970	1980	Operated as an all-cargo freighter aircraft.
Lockheed L-1011 TriStar	1985	1994	Replaced by McDonnell Douglas DC-10.
McDonnell Douglas DC-9-10	1966/1985	1971/1992	First jet operated by Hawaiian Airlines. N112PS, N558HA, and N930EA were leased to Hawaiian in the late '80s to the early '90s.
McDonnell Douglas DC-9-30	1968	1975	Replaced by McDonnell Douglas DC-9-50.
McDonnell Douglas DC-9-50	1975	2001	Replaced by Boeing 717-200.
McDonnell Douglas DC-10-10	1994	2003	Replaced by Boeing 767-300ER.
McDonnell Douglas DC-10-30	1999	2001	Leased from American Airlines and Continental Airlines.
McDonnell Douglas MD-81	1981	1990	
NAMC YS-11	1966	1967	
Short 330	1978	1980	
Sikorsky S-38	1929	1942	Seaplane (amphibious aircraft).
Sikorsky S-43	1935	1946	Seaplane (amphibious aircraft).
Vickers Viscount	1963	1964	

== Services ==
=== In-flight services ===
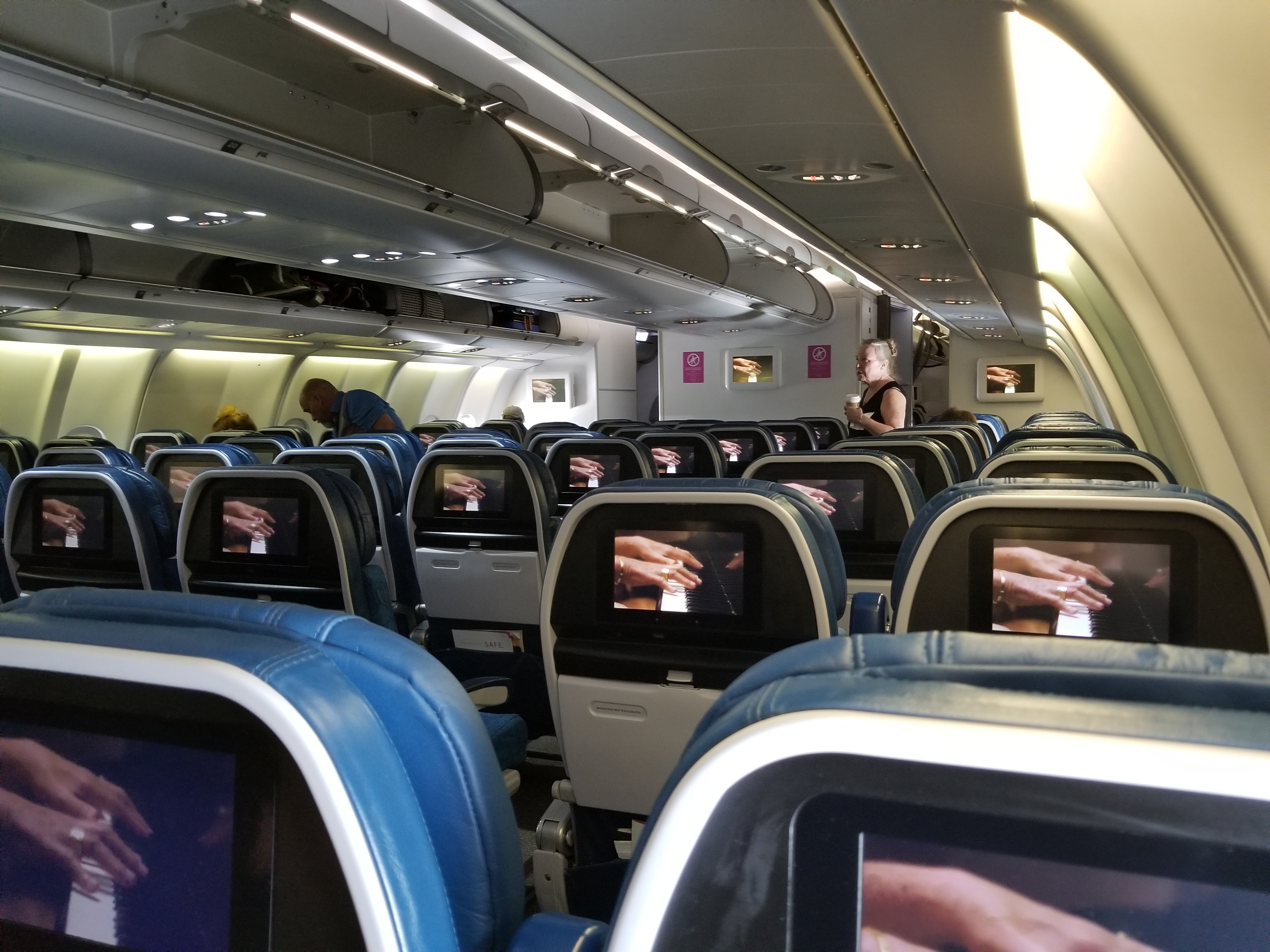
The economy cabin on a Hawaiian Airbus A330-200

==== Catering ====
Hawaiian provides complimentary and paid beverage service on all of its flights. Meals are not provided on inter-island flights because of their short length (30–45 minutes). On its U.S. mainland flights, Hawaiian is one of the only major U.S. airlines to provide complimentary meals in its main cabin (coach class); each meal is made with no preservatives and with all-natural ingredients and is packaged with recyclable materials. In 2009, Hawaiian introduced premium meals in its main cabin, giving passengers the option of having the complimentary meal or paying to upgrade to a premium meal. The premium meals consisted of a variety of high-end Asian cuisines but were later discontinued.

In March 2007, Hawaiian introduced a "tasting menu" or "tapas menu" for its first-class passengers on its U.S. mainland and international flights. The menu consists of twenty entrees set on a rotation, with five available on any given flight. Passengers are provided information on the available entrees for their flight when they board or shortly after takeoff and may choose up to three entrees as part of their inflight meal.

In August 2012, Hawaiian announced an upgrade to its economy class in-flight U.S. mainland service. Among the upgrades were a new menu, a complimentary glass of wine on lunch or dinner flights, and a free tropical cocktail before landing on breakfast flights. This was in contrast to other airlines, which cut back on meal service. According to Hawaiian's then-CEO Mark Dunkerley:

"In today's competitive world you cannot justify providing complimentary meals on a traditional business model. It simply does not pay for itself... which explains why essentially everybody has taken all that free food off the airplane. We're being illogical by actually investing heavily in this area...It's part of who we are, and it's what makes us different from everybody else."

Starting December 1, 2017, guests in the main cabin on Hawaiian flights between Hawaiʻi and western U.S. gateway cities will be treated to complimentary meal service exclusively created for the airline's new Pau Hāna Café brand. The Pau Hāna Café, named after the Hawaiian term for "finished work", is a branded continental breakfast box for brunch and a hot sandwich and side for lunch.

On December 20, 2017, a partnership was announced with Mana Up, the Hawaiian-based accelerator for local consumer packaged goods, to increase the diversity and volume of locally made products served on board.

In February 2024, the airline announced it would offer free in-flight Wi-Fi provided by SpaceX's Starlink, making it the first major US airline to offer the satellite-based service. Costs were not disclosed. It came at a time when other airlines were increasing their high-speed offerings. It follows an agreement signed in April 2022 to use the Starlink network that allowed the company to offer inflight wi-fi for the first time.

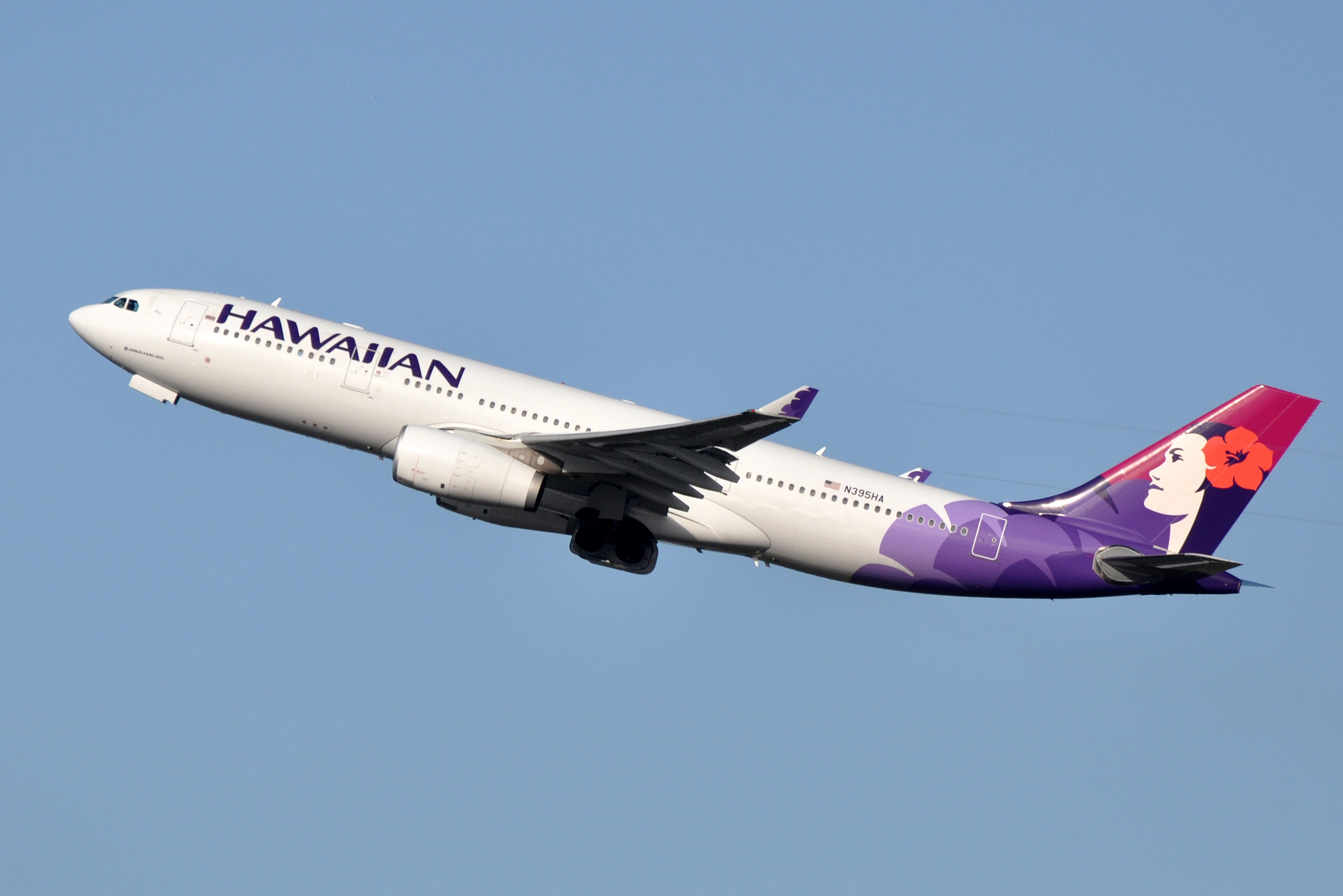
Hawaiian Airbus A330-243

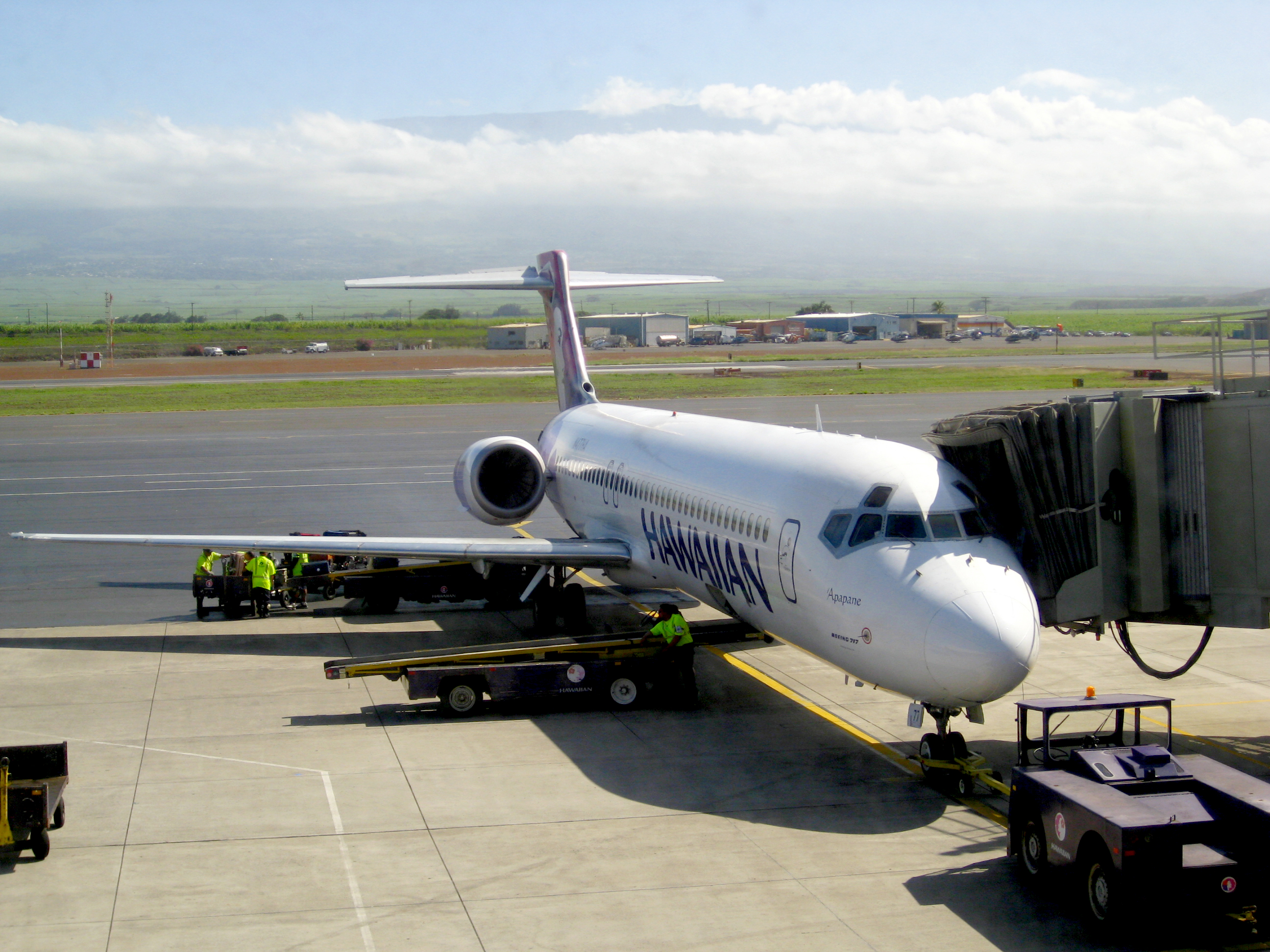
A Boeing 717 at Kahului, Maui

== Accidents and incidents ==
- On December 23, 2000, a Hawaiian Airlines McDonnell Douglas DC-10 operating HA481 experienced a runway overrun at Faa'a International Airport in Papeete. An investigation determined that the incident was due to improper spoiler configuration and the flight crew's decision to land in a thunderstorm. There were no fatalities.
- On May 1, 2015, a Hawaiian Airlines Boeing 767 operating flight HA24 from Kahului Airport to Oakland, California, returned to the airport because of smoke in the cabin. The passengers were evacuated via the emergency slides. There were two minor injuries.
- On May 15, 2015, a Hawaiian Airlines Boeing 717 operating flight HA118 from Daniel K. Inouye International Airport to Kona International Airport started emitting smoke from one of its engines. It diverted to Kahului Airport, where it was met by fire engines that extinguished the fire. There were no fatalities and no evacuation was ordered.
- On August 13, 2018, a Hawaiian Airlines Airbus A321neo (N204HA) operating flight HA56 experienced a tailstrike upon landing at Los Angeles, causing substantial damage to the aircraft yet no injuries among the 197 passengers and crew members.
- On August 22, 2019, an Airbus A321neo (N218HA) flying from Oakland to Honolulu (operated as flight HA47) made a successful landing at Honolulu after the cabin started filling with smoke. Seven people were hospitalized for smoke inhalation. There were no serious injuries among the 191 passengers and crew. Hawaiian Airlines stated that it believed that the incident was caused by a faulty engine seal.
- On December 18, 2022, an Airbus A330-243 (N393HA), operating flight HA35, encountered severe turbulence 30 minutes before landing in Honolulu from Phoenix, Arizona. Of the 291 people on board, there were no fatalities, but 36 passengers and crew members were injured, with 20 taken to the hospital and 11 in serious condition. The aircraft was reportedly damaged.

== See also ==
- List of airlines of Hawaii
- Hana Hou!, Hawaiian's in-flight magazine
- Air transportation in the United States

== Bibliography ==
- Banham, Russ (2014). Hawaiian: How Innovation, Tenacity, and the Aloha Spirit Shaped Hawai'i's First Airline. Greenwich Publishing. ISBN 978-1-941800003. Archived from the original on December 4, 2024.
- Cohen, S (1986). Hawaiian Airlines. Missoula (Montana): Pictorial Histories Publishing Co.
- Gradidge, J.M. (1997). The Convairliners story. Air-Britain (Historians) Ltd. ISBN 0-85130-243-2.
- Gradidge, Jennifer (2006). DC-1, DC-2, DC-3 – The First Seventy Years. Air-Britain (Historians) Ltd. ISBN 0-85130-332-3.
