= Merger of Alaska Airlines and Hawaiian Airlines =

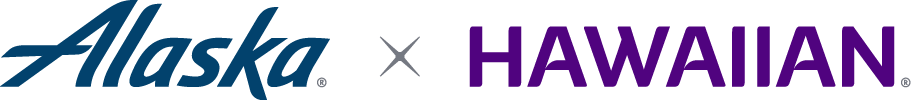
- Initiator: Alaska Airlines
- Target: Hawaiian Airlines
- Type: Merger
- Cost: US$1.9 billion
- Initiated: December 3, 2023
- Completed: September 18, 2024
- Status: Completed

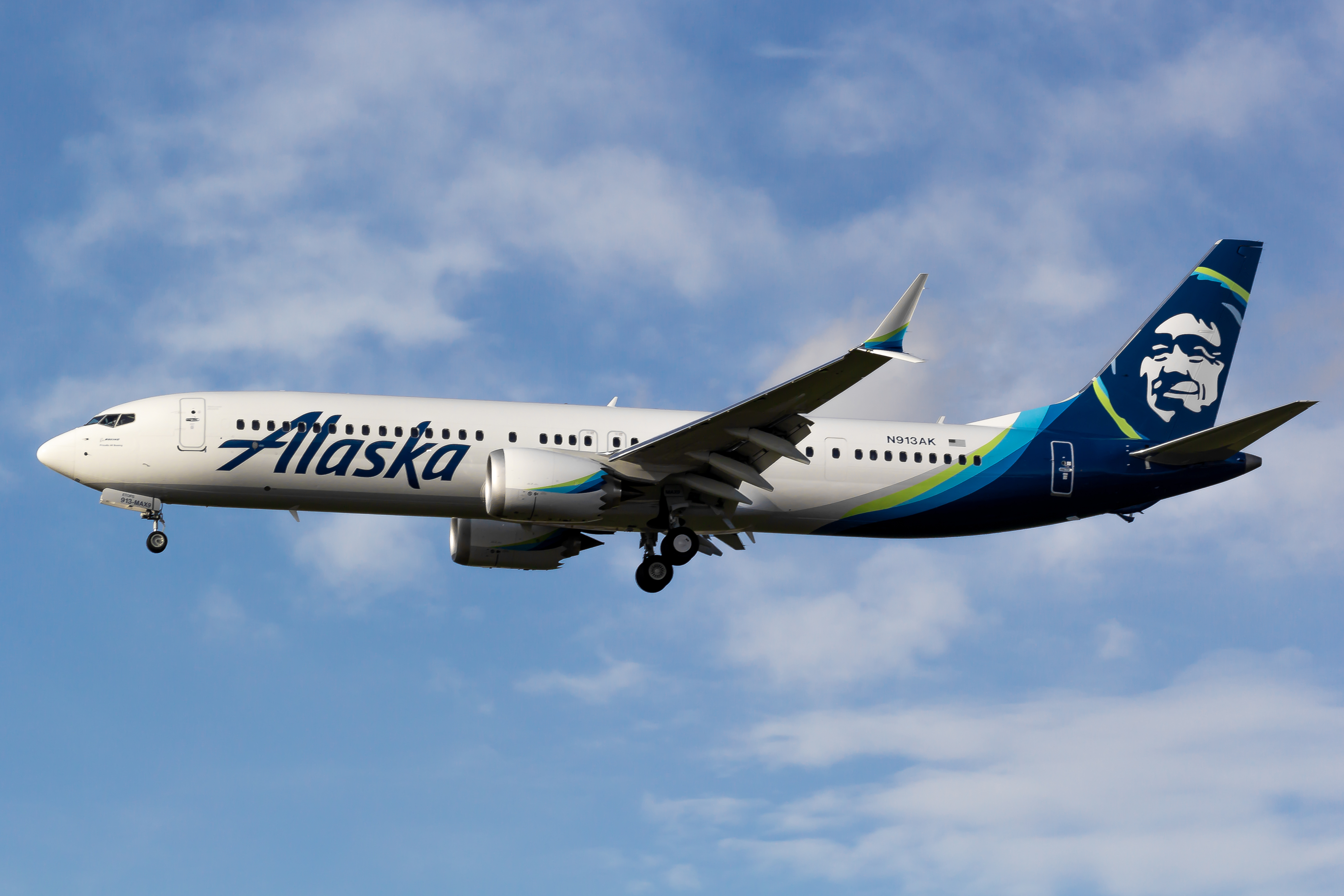
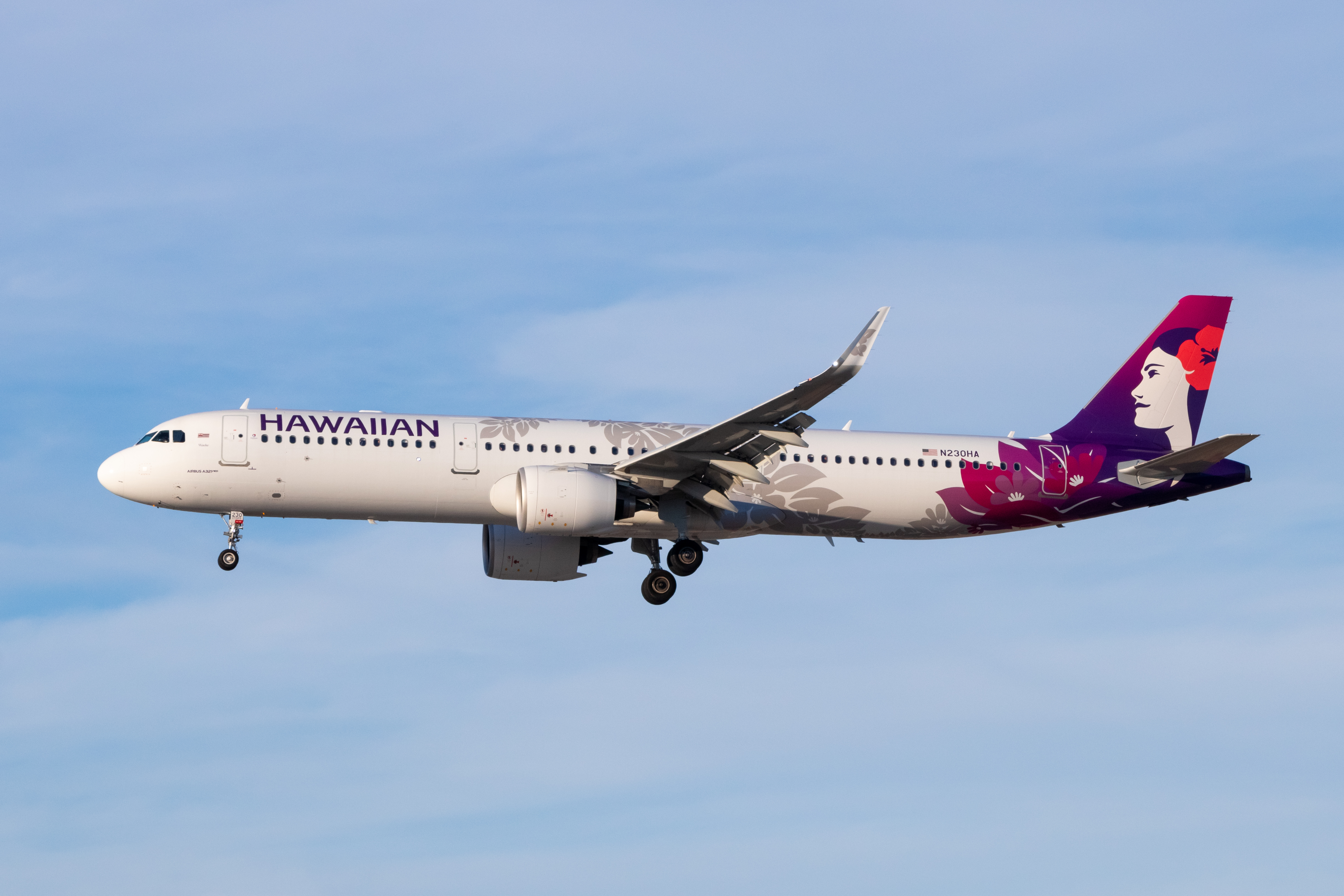
A 737 MAX 9 of Alaska Airlines (left) and an Airbus A321neo of Hawaiian Airlines

On December 3, 2023, Alaska Airlines announced plans to acquire Hawaiian Airlines. Airline industry analysts had promoted the merger for years, which would create a combined carrier focused on the West Coast of the United States. The merger provided Alaska, which is primarily a domestic carrier with narrowbody aircraft, with Hawaiian's widebody jets, pilots, and international networks.

The proposed merger was approved by shareholders of Hawaiian Airlines in April 2024. The merger was previously approved by the boards of both Alaska Air Group and Hawaiian Holdings, Inc. In August 2024, the proposed merger received de-facto approval from the Department of Justice. In September 2024, the Department of Transportation officially cleared the deal. On September 18, 2024, the merger was completed.

== Financials ==
Under the deal, Alaska acquired shares of Hawaiian for $1.9 billion in cash along with an assumption of approximately $900 million in outstanding debt, valuing the company at $18 per share. The price represented a significant premium over Hawaiian's valuation prior to the deal's announcement which had hit a 52-week low of $4 in October 2023.

The deal was widely viewed as a lifeline for Hawaiian Airlines which had experienced declining revenue and a shaky bottomline since COVID-19.

== Combined route network and branding ==
When the merger was announced, the companies overlapped on 12 nonstop routes, an issue that they described as minimal. Alaska Airlines highlighted its experience operating within Alaska, including service to 16 communities without road access, and pledged to maintain a strong interisland schedule in Hawaii.

The merger provided Alaska with Hawaiian's widebody jets, pilots, and international networks. The deal retains both Alaska Airlines and Hawaiian Airlines as separate brands. The combined company would control approximately 40% of the traffic between Hawaii and the United States mainland.

== Loyalty program integration ==
Under the deal, Hawaiian Airlines would become a member of the Oneworld alliance and the two airlines would operate a combined frequent-flier program. The airlines confirmed that miles held in Hawaiian's HawaiianMiles frequent flyer program would be converted to Alaska Airlines Mileage Plan scheme at a 1:1 ratio. Those who qualify for "Pualani Elite" statuses in HawaiianMiles would see their elite status transferred to Mileage Plan. Analysts noted that the combined program would benefit HawaiianMiles members by making earned miles more valuable and increasing redemption opportunities.

== Reactions to the proposed merger ==
A merger between Alaska Airlines and Hawaiian Airlines had long been speculated on by industry insiders and analysts. In 2024, the Wall Street Journal speculated that consolidation would lead to higher prices for consumers on flights to Hawaii although this was disputed by the companies.

=== Support from political leaders ===
When the merger was announced, Gov. Josh Green (D-HI) promised that he and Hawaii Attorney General Anne Lopez would monitor the merger "very closely" adding that both "are very high-quality companies, but ultimately, I will be watching to make sure all of our state's needs are met and all of our workers are cared for." Green, along with Governors Jay Inslee of Washington State and Tina Kotek of Oregon, later jointly sent a letter to the Department of Transportation expressing strong support for the merger.

As part of its effort to garner local support for the merger, Alaska Airlines made three promises to Hawaii residents to maintain the Hawaiian Airlines brand, keep all front-line union employees, and protect neighbor island flights.

In February 2024, Richard Bissen (mayor of Maui County), Rick Blangiardi (mayor of the City and County of Honolulu), Derek Kawakami (mayor of Kauai County), and Mitch Roth (mayor of Hawaiʻi County) published an open letter in the Honolulu Star-Advertiser declaring their support for the merger as "good for Hawaiʻi" and enhance service to neighbor islands.

=== Consumer lawsuit ===
In April 2024, eight plaintiffs sued Alaska Airlines in an attempt to prevent the deal, arguing it would violate U.S. antitrust law. The lawsuit was dismissed by the district court in August 2024 after Judge Derrick Watson ruled that they lacked standing to sue.

=== Competitor reactions ===
United Airlines raised concerns with the Department of Transportation on August 27 about how the merger would affect its ability to partner with Hawaiian Airlines on inter-island flights, according to a disclosure. Analysts noted that United was currently the largest carrier airline between the mainland and Hawaii and "the fact that United [Airlines] views this as bad for them underscores that it likely strengthens competition".

== Regulatory approval ==
Under President Biden, the U.S. Department of Justice worked to prevent further consolidation in the airline industry but it was initially unclear whether they would file suit against the merger with analysts noting differences between the proposal and prior proposals opposed by the administration. Company executives expressed confidence that the combination would receive federal approval.

=== Department of Justice approval ===
When the deal was announced, executives expected approval from the Justice Department to take between a year and 18 months. A Securities and Exchange Commission filing in May 2024 indicated that the Justice Department has until August 2024 to make a decision on whether to file a suit against the merger.

On August 20, 2024 at 12:01 am ET, the Department of Justice's formal antitrust review period for the merger officially expired meaning that Alaska Airlines had cleared its primary regulatory hurdle to complete the deal. The milestone in the merger saga was viewed as blockbuster news in Hawaii as the home of Hawaiian Airlines and came following three extensions to the review period which was originally slated to end on August 3.

=== Department of Transportation approval ===
Following Department of Justice approval, review moved to the U.S. Department of Transportation (DOT) which must also give its approval for the merger to proceed. The Association of Flight Attendants which represents crew at both carriers described the DOT process as "typically […] a perfunctory approval".

In September 2024, the DOT approved the merger with conditions. To secure DOT approvals, the carriers agreed to maintain existing service on key routes, protect the value of loyalty program rewards, and ensure competitive access at the Honolulu hub airport. The department's approval marks the final regulatory hurdle for the two airlines. The carriers stated they expected to close the deal in the days following this approval, and the merger was completed on September 18, 2024.

== Aftermath ==
=== Seattle global hub ===
Following the merger, Alaska Airlines announced that it would redeploy some widebody jets acquired from Hawaiian to Seattle as part of its strategy to turn the airport into a top-tier global hub. While its Seattle hub was the largest airline hub on the West Coast as of 2025, serving 104 nonstop destinations within North America, Alaska lacked longhaul international flying. The strategy is intended to allow Alaska to compete with rival Delta for international premium passengers in Seattle where Alaska has over double the share of scheduled seats from the airport but trails internationally.

In December 2024, Alaska announced that it would begin offering its first longhaul flights from Seattle to Tokyo Narita and Seoul Incheon starting May 2025. The routes would be operating initially utilizing Airbus A330 aircraft acquired from Hawaiian. Both the Narita and Incheon flights transitioned to the Dreamliner fleet in the second half of 2026.

In June 2025, Alaska announced that its first European destination from Seattle would be Rome Fiumicino launching in May 2026. In December 2025, Alaska announced a leasing agreement with American Airlines that would allow it to utilize a daily slot pair at London Heathrow to launch flights to London, also in May 2026. The flight to Rome would be the first route operated on Alaska's new fleet of Boeing 787 Dreamliners with the Aurora livery, with Heathrow following shortly thereafter.

It followed up the route's launch by announcing in August 2026 that flights to Athens and Paris would launch in May 2027 as Alaska aims to fly to over 12 international longhaul destinations from Seattle. In October 2026, flights were announced to Osaka Kansai and Papeete starting in May 2027 marking Alaska's eight and ninth longhaul routes from Seattle.

=== Aurora livery ===
In 2026, Alaska announced its new "Aurora" livery inspired by the aurora borealis. The global livery would be used primarily on longhaul international flights and debuted on Alaska's 787 fleet. The airline later announced the launch of the "Aurora Suites" with lie-flat seats and doors that will be installed on its 787s and some 737s.

=== Commitment to Boeing ===
Prior to the merger, Alaska operated an entirely Boeing fleet and displayed the tagline "proudly all Boeing" on its aircraft. Following the acquisition of Hawaiian and its Airbus aircraft, Alaska announced major purchase of Boeing aircraft and announced that it would update its slogan to "Proudly Boeing".

=== Pilots union merger ===
On November 11, 2026, following more than 600 days of negotiations, representatives of the pilot groups at Alaska Airlines and Hawaiian Airlines at Air Line Pilots Association, International unanimously came to a tentative agreement on a joint contract. The contract must now be ratified by the combined membership with the voting period set for December 1 to 22, 2026.
