= Inflight Connectivity =

Aircraft passenger service

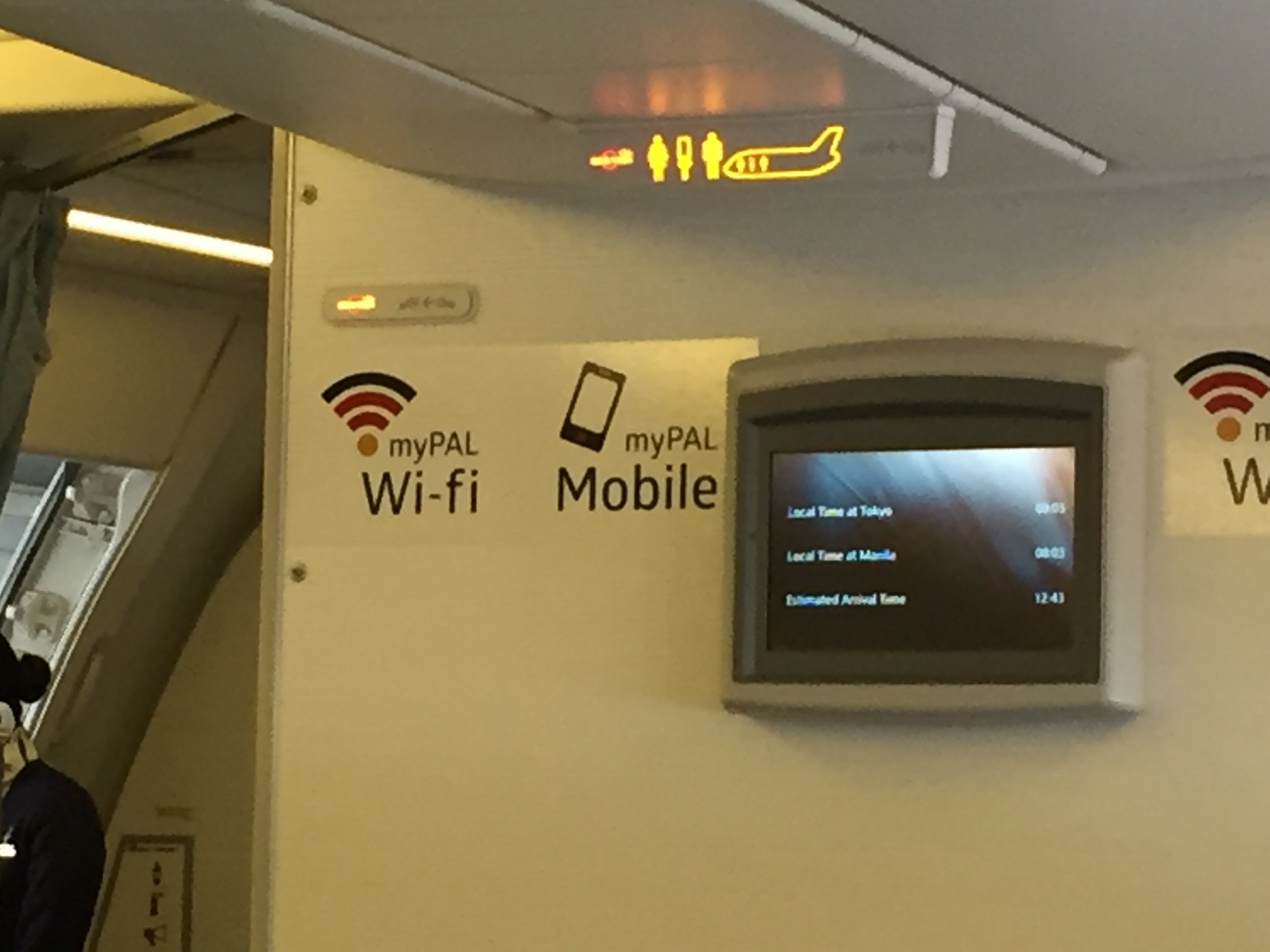
An aircraft offering in-flight Internet in the passenger cabin in 2016

In-Flight Connectivity (IFC) is a service that provides Internet to aircraft passengers during a flight through an onboard local wireless network, typically Wi-Fi. Since 2004, numerous airlines have integrated this access into their in-flight entertainment offerings (collectively known as In-Flight Entertainment & Connectivity, or IFEC), which are delivered wirelessly to customer-owned Personal Entertainment Devices such as smartphones and tablets, or via a wired network connection to in-seat screen systems. The range of in-flight services offered by airlines varies significantly. Some airlines provide completely free and unlimited access, while others may offer complimentary limited service exclusively for instant messaging, with additional fees for other services or navigation packages during the flight. Market research on customer behaviour indicates that this service can influence a passenger's choice of airline, making it a new competitive factor in the passenger air transport industry.

== History ==
In 2001, Boeing had plans to provide Internet connectivity on several U.S. airlines. However, broader economic challenges for the airline industry following the September 11 attacks led to these plans being cancelled.

On 15 January 2003, Germany’s Lufthansa became the first airline to provide in-flight Internet service to its passengers, following a series of tests and through an alliance with Connexion by Boeing, which began developing in-flight Internet connections using Ethernet and 802.11 Wi-Fi. The inaugural commercial flight featuring this service was operated by a Boeing 747-400 from Frankfurt Airport to Washington Dulles.

In December 2013, JetBlue became the first airline in the United States to offer free Internet access on some of its domestic flights.

== Technical considerations ==
While the term Wi-Fi is often incorrectly and generically used to mean internet access, it is important to distinguish between the two, as the former is a wireless connection between the end user device and a local network, and does not always imply that Internet access is available via that network. This distinction is especially important when dealing with publicly accessible wireless networks such as those on aircraft and cruise ships that offer local services over Wi-Fi without requiring access beyond the vessel. Internet access is often considered a premium/paid service in these scenarios.

Internet connectivity is typically available from gate to gate on commercial aircraft equipped with a satellite connection, although on aircraft that use legacy cellular Air-to-Ground (ATG) connections, it is deactivated during takeoff and landing or below 10,000 feet. Passengers can connect to the Internet aboard the aircraft via Wi-Fi. The speed and coverage of the Internet connection during the flight may vary based on the specific systems and technologies used by the airline. Typically, the Wi-Fi network uses open access without a pre-shared key and is unencrypted, which carries some security and privacy risks for applications that do not use SSL at the application level. Some IT security experts consistently recommend implementing precautions such as utilizing antivirus software, VPNs, and other network security measures when using this network, although modern operating platforms inherently mitigate many of these risks.

The growing use of Wi-Fi on personal devices by travelers is enabling airlines to eliminate in-seat screens, resulting in fuel savings and reduced aircraft weight.

In addition to offering internet access to passengers, some airlines also use the IFC system to provide operational Internet connectivity to the cabin and flight crews via Electronic flight bag devices, as well as for maintenance and ground crews.

A typical commercial airliner will have between 2 and 6 cabin wireless access points (CWAPs) depending on the size of the aircraft to provide wireless connectivity to passengers and crew. These CWAPs are typically based on off-the-shelf enterprise-grade APs that have been modified and certified to aircraft standards for safety, power, connectivity, and management (such as ARINC 629). A server located in the avionics bay handles most of the local networking tasks such as DHCP addressing, DNS, routing, captive portal, onboard content filtering, content caching, local content delivery, and other IFE functions. It will typically also have a built-in network switch to connect the various devices on the network. Internet-facing hardware is typically one or more satellite modems and antenna systems (which can be a mechanical tracking antenna or an electronically steered antenna) mounted on top of the aircraft with a clear view of the sky. Older IFC systems used an Air-to-Ground cellular modem with one or more antennas mounted on the belly of the aircraft, connecting to a dedicated network of cellular base stations on the ground. Some systems still keep a cellular modem for Out-of-band management.

== Charges for use ==
Unlike the Internet service provided at airports, which is mostly free of charge, each airline determines its own fees associated with the use of Wi-Fi during a flight, which can vary from free and unlimited access to charges for data packages or daily passes for browsing. As of 2024, the airlines providing complimentary in-flight Wi-Fi service for all classes are:

=== Without loyalty membership ===
- Air India (from January 2025 for domestic and international flights)
- Air New Zealand (since October 2017)
- Alaska Airlines (Starlink-equipped aircraft)
- Fiji Airways (from November 2024)
- Hawaiian Airlines (service provided by Starlink since September 2024)
- JetBlue (free and unlimited since 2013)
- Malaysia Airlines (from 2023)
- Norwegian Airlines (unlimited for standard Wi-Fi, there is an additional charge for premium Wi-Fi with higher speed)
- Philippines Airlines (10 MB for economy class, 100 MB for business class)
- Porter Airlines (Embraer E195-E2 aircraft only)
- Qantas (on selected domestic flights and international flights to New Zealand, Hong Kong and Singapore on Wi-Fi enabled A321XLR, A350 and B787)
- United Airlines (Starlink-equipped aircraft)

=== With loyalty membership ===
These airlines allow free access to Wi-Fi on board for passengers who have previously signed up for a loyalty program, such as a frequent-flyer program:

- Air Canada
- Etihad Airways
- Emirates
- Singapore Airlines
- Qatar Airways
- Delta Air Lines
- Turkish Airlines
- LATAM Airlines (since March 2024)
- Air France (since September 2024)
- Lufthansa
- Southwest Airlines (since October 2025, sponsored)
- American Airlines (since January 2026, sponsored)

== See also ==
- Passenger Wi-Fi on subway trains
