= Wien Air Alaska =

American airline (1927–1984)

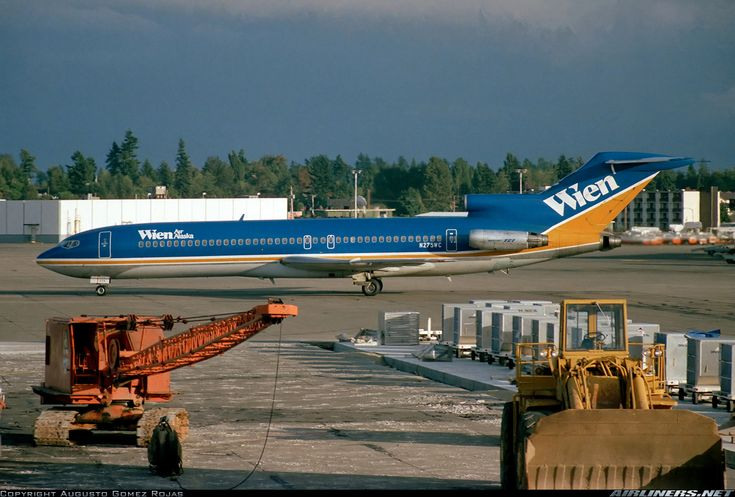
- Boeing 727
| IATA | ICAO | Call sign |
|---|---|---|
| WE (-1968), WC (1968-1984) | WAA | WIEN |
- Commenced operations: June 1927; 99 years ago
- Ceased operations: November 23, 1984; 41 years ago
- Operating bases: Anchorage Airport
- Secondary hubs: FAI, Fairbanks, AK
- Focus cities: SEA, Seattle, WA
- Frequent-flyer program: Premium Bonus Account
- Key people: Noel Wien, Ralph Wien, Sigurd "Sig" Wien, Merrill Wien

Wien Air Alaska (IATA: WC) was a United States airline that was the result of a merger of Northern Consolidated Airlines (NCA) and Wien Alaska Airways (WE). It initially used the name Wien Consolidated Airlines (WC) following the merger on April 1, 1968. On August 1, 1973, Wien Consolidated became Wien Air Alaska. The company was famous for being the first airline in Alaska, and one of the first in the United States. It ceased operations on 23 November 1984, at which point it was operating as Wien Airlines.

== History ==
Noel Wien flew an open-cockpit biplane, a Hisso Standard J1 from Anchorage, Alaska's "Park Strip" to Fairbanks, Alaska on 6 July 1924 for Alaska Aerial Transportation Company.

In 1925, Wien purchased a Fokker F.III monoplane with a cabin built in 1921 in Amsterdam for the Fairbanks Airplane Company, and it was shipped to Seward, Alaska, by boat, then shipped in pieces via the Alaska Railroad to Fairbanks. Ralph Wien, Noel's brother, came with him, to work as a mechanic. They assembled the Fokker F.III Monoplane in Fairbanks. Yet, Noel and Ralph quit the company in Nov. 1925.

Noel and Ralph Wien went into partnership with Gene Miller, and purchased a very used Hisso Standard from the Fairbanks Airplane Co. in 1927. In June they established their business in Nome, servicing Candle, Deering, Kotzebue, and Point Hope. At the end of the summer of 1927, Noel went into business for himself, purchasing a Stinson Detroiter he could fly year round, from Hubert Wilkins. Noel, and his Wien Alaska Airways, started a regular weekly round trip flight between Fairbanks and Nome. Noel also secured special air mail flights during the spring and fall breakup.

On 20 Oct. 1928, Wien Alaska Airways, Inc. was incorporated with Noel as president, Ralph as vice-president, and Miners and Merchants Bank president Granville (Grant) R. Jackson as secretary. The new company built a hangar at Weeks Field and promptly ordered a Hamilton Metalplane.

Noel taught Ralph how to fly in 1924. Ralph was killed on October 12, 1930, while flying a diesel-powered Bellanca Bush plane with Fr. Philip Dolen, Superior general of Alaskan Catholic missions, and Fr. William Walsh, a diocesan priest from Oakland, California, on board.

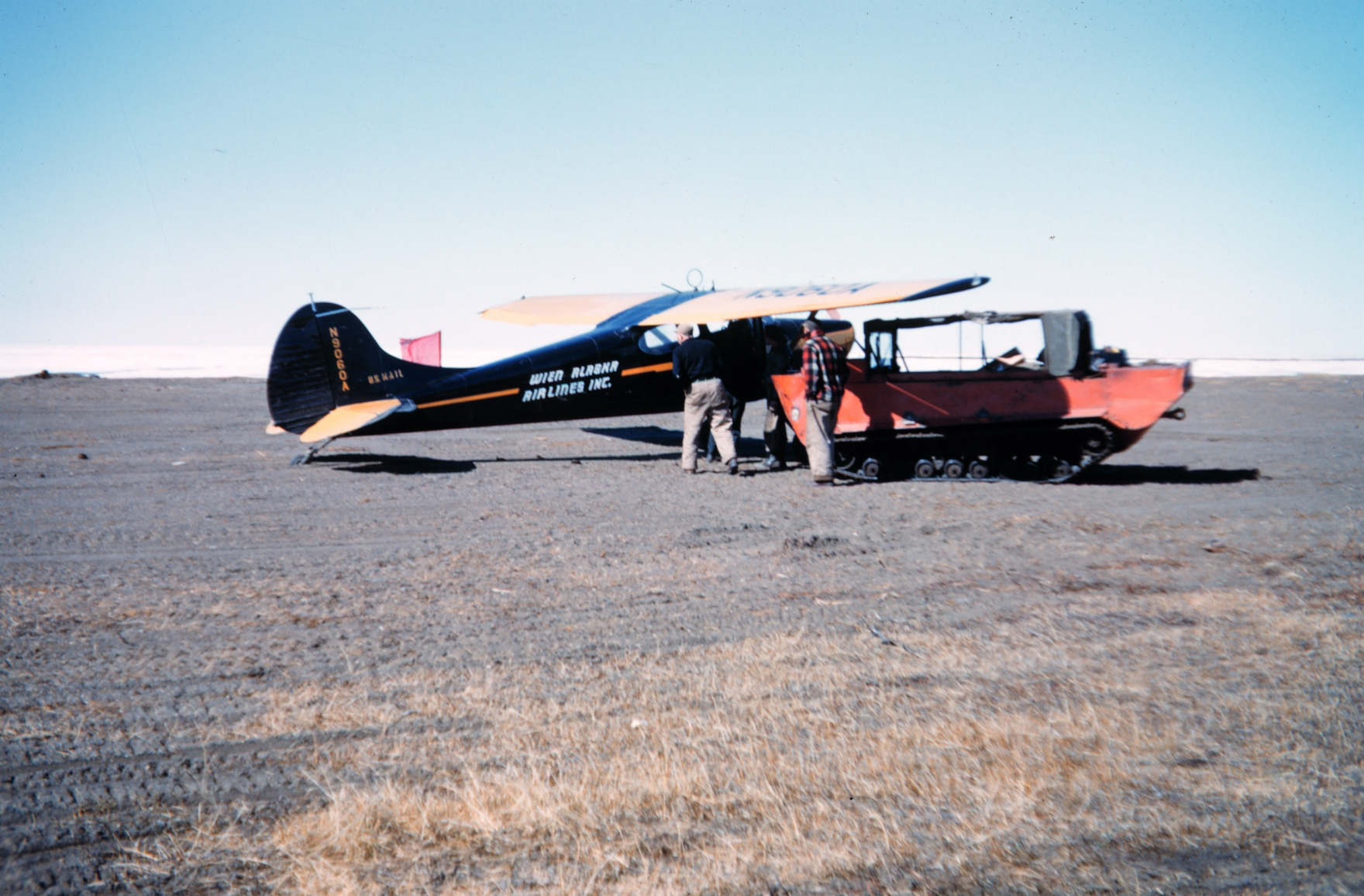
A Wien Alaska Airlines Cessna 170 met by a M29C weasel at Oliktok Point, Alaska (North Slope), Summer 1951

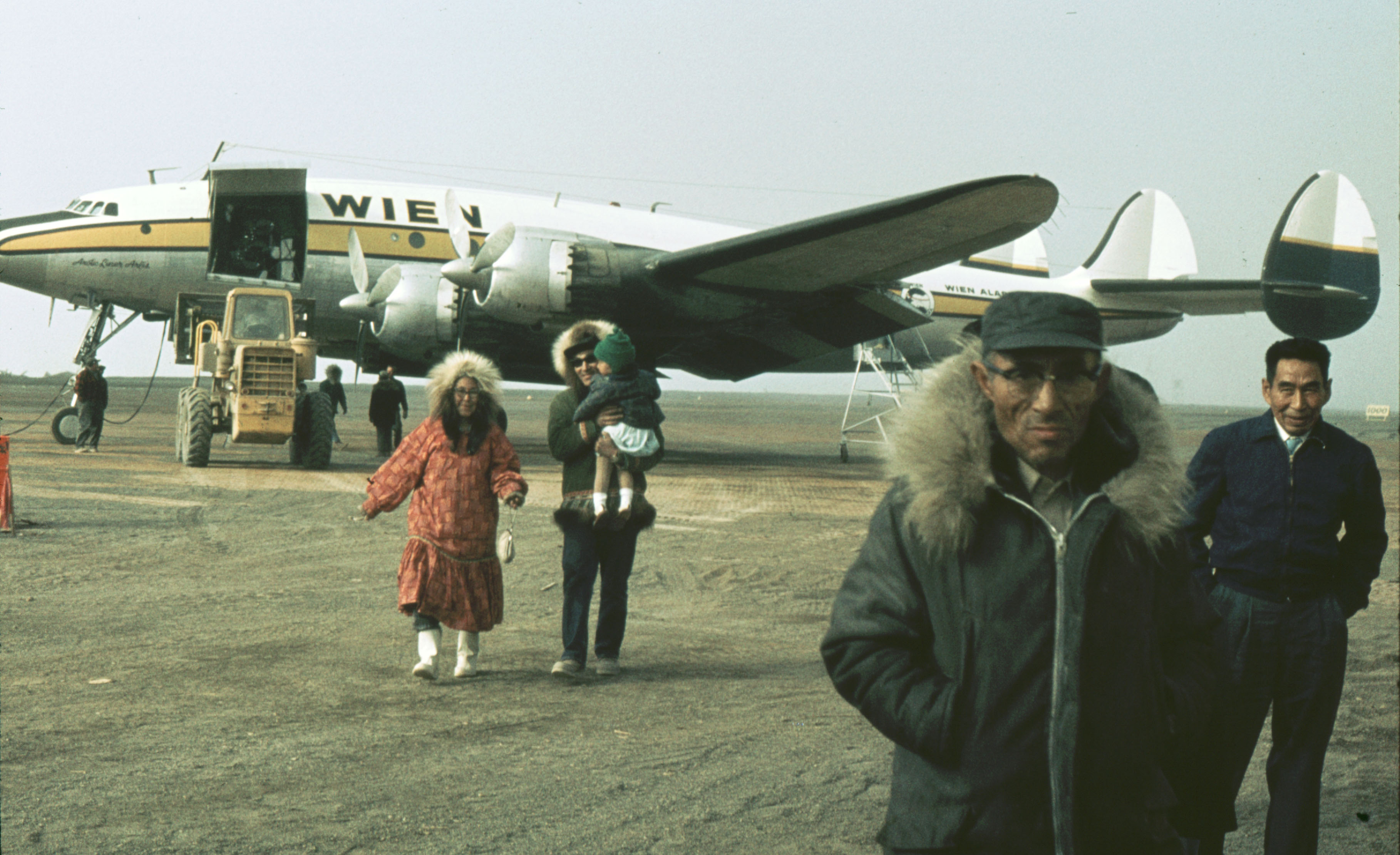
Iñupiat people at Barrow Airport, in front of a Wien Alaska Airlines Lockheed "Constellation", circa 1966

In 1929, Noel, Ralph and Grant Jackson sold Wien Alaska Airways to Avco. Noel's company plus Anchorage Air Transport and Bennett-Rodebaugh Company were merged into a new company called Alaskan Airways Inc. Noel flew for Alaskan Airways from Feb. 1931 until Jan. 1932. In Aug. 1932, once his non-compete clause ended, Noel restarted Wien Airways of Alaska, Inc. Northern Air Transport of Nome merged with Wien in 1936. In 1936, Wien had the first air-to-ground radio links in Alaska, and by 1937, Noel had 3 other pilots flying Wien's 8 aircraft, and 3 other mechanics worked with Sigurd Wien, his brother, while 3 people administered their offices in Fairbanks and Nome.

Sig received his commercial rating in 1937. Sig managed the Nome Office and flew the North Slope bush flights. Sig Wien, as a bush pilot, flew contracts for USGS geologic exploration activities including geologist Marvin Mangus.

Noel Wien was forced to sell his shares to Sig in 1940, so Noel could pay for his wife's medical care. He returned as a vice-president and continued to fly for the airline into the 1950s. Noel then worked public relations for the company into the 1970s.

Northern Consolidated Airlines (NCA) was formed on 8 May 1947 with Ray Petersen as president. The company was an amalgamation of Ray Petersen Flying Service, Northern Airways, Walatka Air Service, and Northern Air Service. Ray Petersen had started Ray Petersen Flying Service in 1937, based in Bethel, Alaska, supporting the platinum mining operations in Platinum, Alaska. In 1941, Ray moved his headquarters to Anchorage, and in 1943, he purchased Bristol Bay Air Service and Jim Dodson Air Service. After WWII, NCA purchased several war surplus Douglas DC3s.

The front cover of the September 16, 1968 Wien system timetable stated, "Alaska's First Airline with America's Newest Jet the 737". This timetable listed Boeing 737-200 jet service being operated on the following routes: Anchorage-Fairbanks, Anchorage-King Salmon, Fairbanks-Barrow and Fairbanks-Galena-Nome-Fairbanks with the latter being a "triangle" routing. On December 6 of the same year it received the first 737 certified by Boeing with the gravel kit which enabled operations into remote airfields in Alaska with unpaved runways.

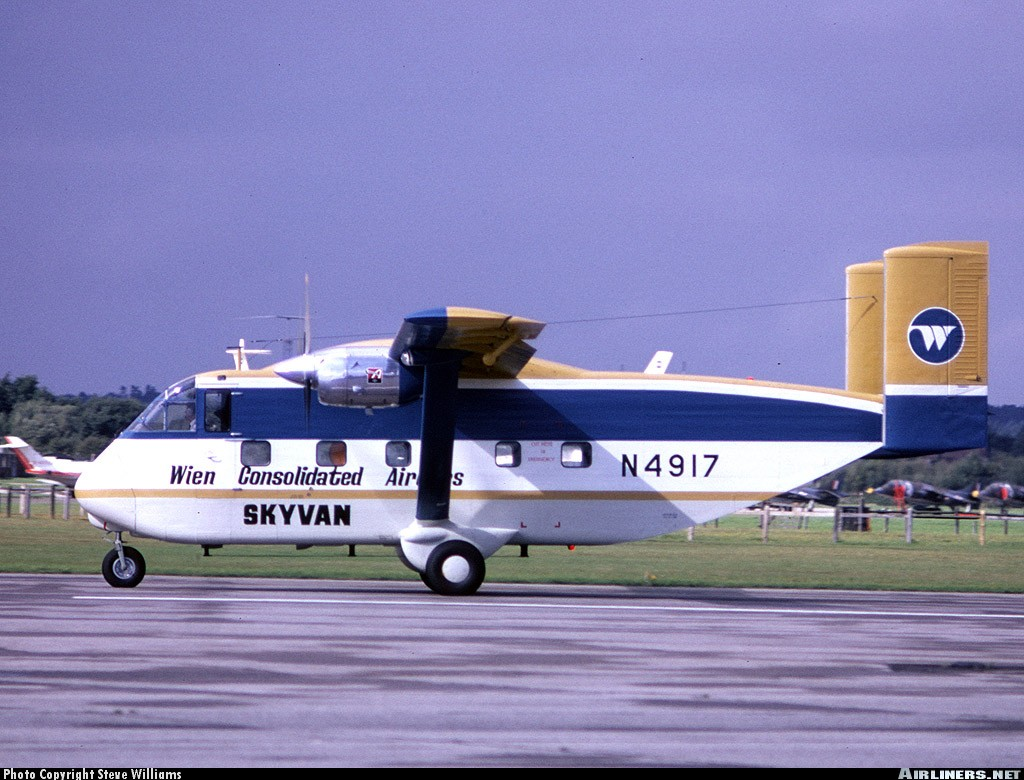
Wien Consolidated Short SC-7 "Skyvan"

On April 1, 1968, Wien merged with Northern Consolidated Airlines (NCA). Sig was named chairman, Ray Petersen president, and Noel and Fritz board members. The new company was called Wien Consolidated Airlines until August 1, 1973, when the company name became Wien Air Alaska. Sig retired and Ray assumed the roles of chairman, president and CEO. By then the airline had more than 800 employees and five Boeing 737-200 jets as well as various turboprop and prop aircraft including Fairchild F-27s, Fairchild Hiller FH-227s, de Havilland Canada DHC-6 Twin Otters, Grumman Mallards, Pilatus Porters, and Short Skyvans. Ray stepped down as president in 1976.

Expansion came at a price, as Wien was pushed to the brink of bankruptcy. Household Finance, controlling owners since 1979, then dumped its investment in the airline and sold the company to Wien's president, Jim J. Flood, in 1983. He shut down the airline, and on November 23, 1984, Wien was liquidated for profit. Noel's son, Merrill, said the end of his family's airline came when it "was bought by a corporate raider on a leveraged buyout and was liquidated for about twice what the stock was selling for. The Airline Deregulation Act of 1978 made this possible." in an interview with Avweb.

Before Wien Air folded in 1985, they were known as the second-oldest airline in the United States.

The company pioneered jet service to gravel runways, and helped develop the Boeing 737-200 Combi aircraft configuration which allowed mixed freight and passenger loads on the main deck of the aircraft. By the spring of 1984, the Wien route network extended from Barrow (now known as Utqiagvik) in the north to dozens of Alaskan communities as well as to cities in the lower 48 states in the western U.S. including Albuquerque, (ABQ), Boise (BOI), Denver (DEN), Phoenix (PHX), Oakland (OAK), Reno (RNO) and Salt Lake City (SLC). Their main bases were located in Anchorage and Seattle.

According to the Official Airline Guide (OAG), Wien was operating interchange passenger service in conjunction with Pan American World Airways (Pan Am) with Boeing 727-100 jetliners in the fall of 1981 between Alaska and destinations in the lower 48 states. The OAG lists these no change of plane through flights to Alaska operating a routing of Miami (MIA) - New Orleans (MSY) - Houston (IAH) - Seattle (SEA) - Anchorage (ANC) and from Alaska on a routing of Anchorage - Seattle - Houston - New Orleans with Wien flight crews operating the service between Anchorage and Seattle and Pan Am flight crews operating the Houston, New Orleans and Miami service with Seattle being the interchange point (also known as a "transport hub") between the two airlines.

Noel Wien's sons flew in an open cockpit biplane from Anchorage's 'Park Strip' to Fairbanks on the 75th anniversary of their father's flight. The municipality of Anchorage and the FAA allowed the plane to take off from the grass park, which was used as a runway in 1924.

=== Timeline ===
- 1924 – 1926 Northern Air Transport
- 1926 – 1935 Wien Airways of Alaska
- 1935 – 1968 Wien Alaska Airlines (WE)
- 1968 – 1973 Wien Consolidated Airlines (WC)
- 1973 – 1984 Wien Air Alaska (WC)
- 1982 – 1984 Wien
- September 1984- November 1984 Wien Airlines

== Destinations ==
=== Destinations in 1984 ===
By March 1984, Wien Air Alaska had expanded its scheduled passenger flights into the western U.S. in addition to continuing to serve many destinations in Alaska. All of the cities in the lower 48 states were served with Boeing 727-200 and/or Boeing 737-200 jetliners at this time. Some smaller destinations in Alaska were served with commuter turboprop aircraft. The following destination information is taken from the March 2, 1984, Wien Air Alaska system timetable route map.

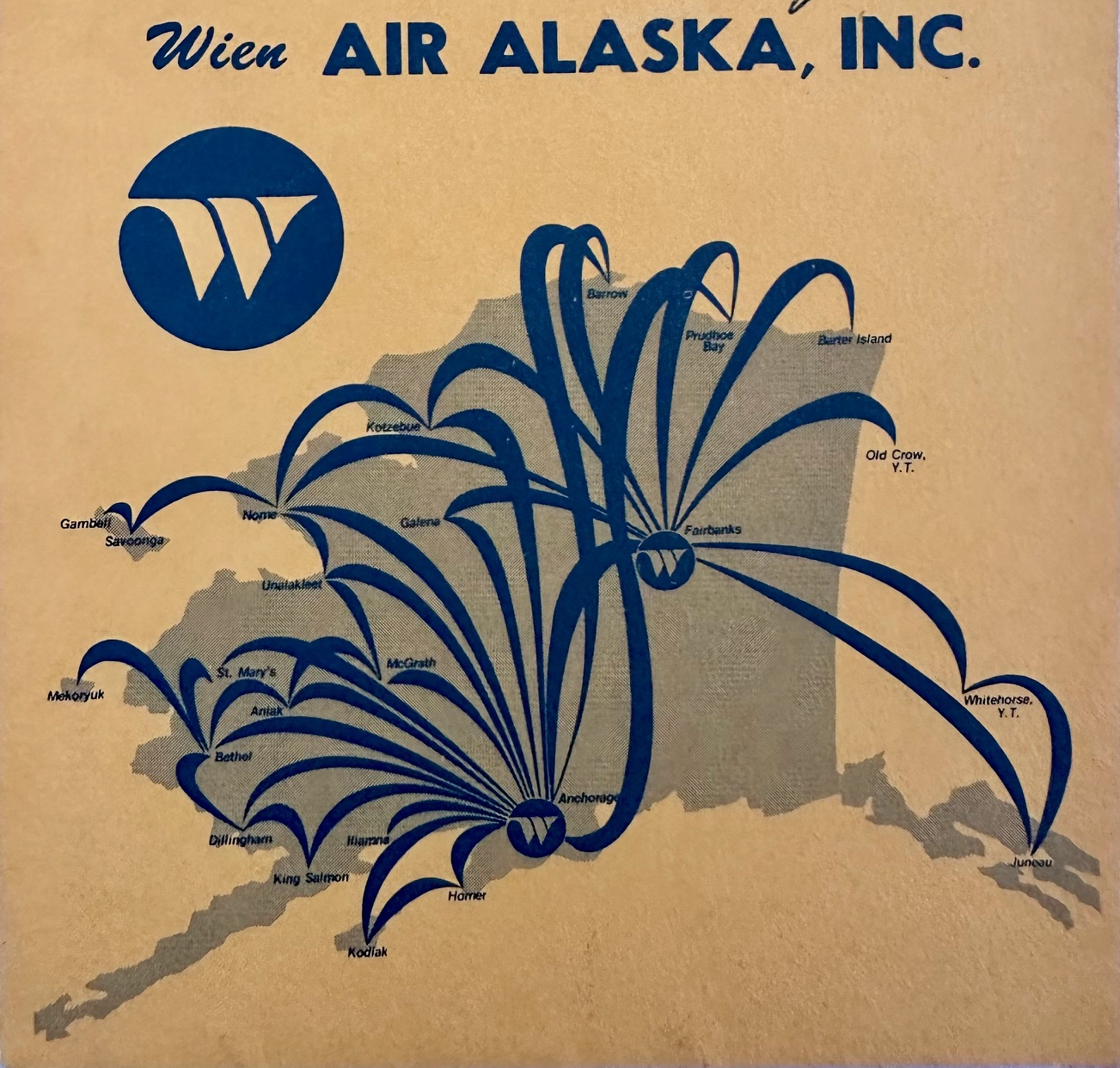
Wien Air Alaska September 1977 Route Map.

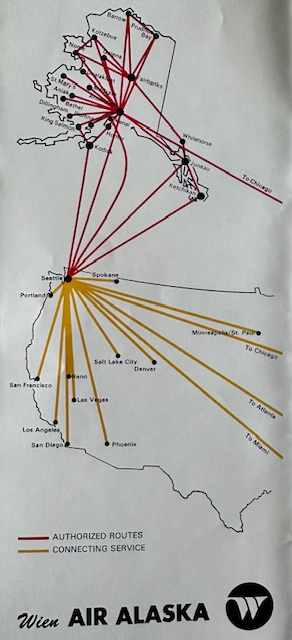
Wien Air Alaska August 1979 Route Map with new Kenai-Seattle Non-Stop Service.

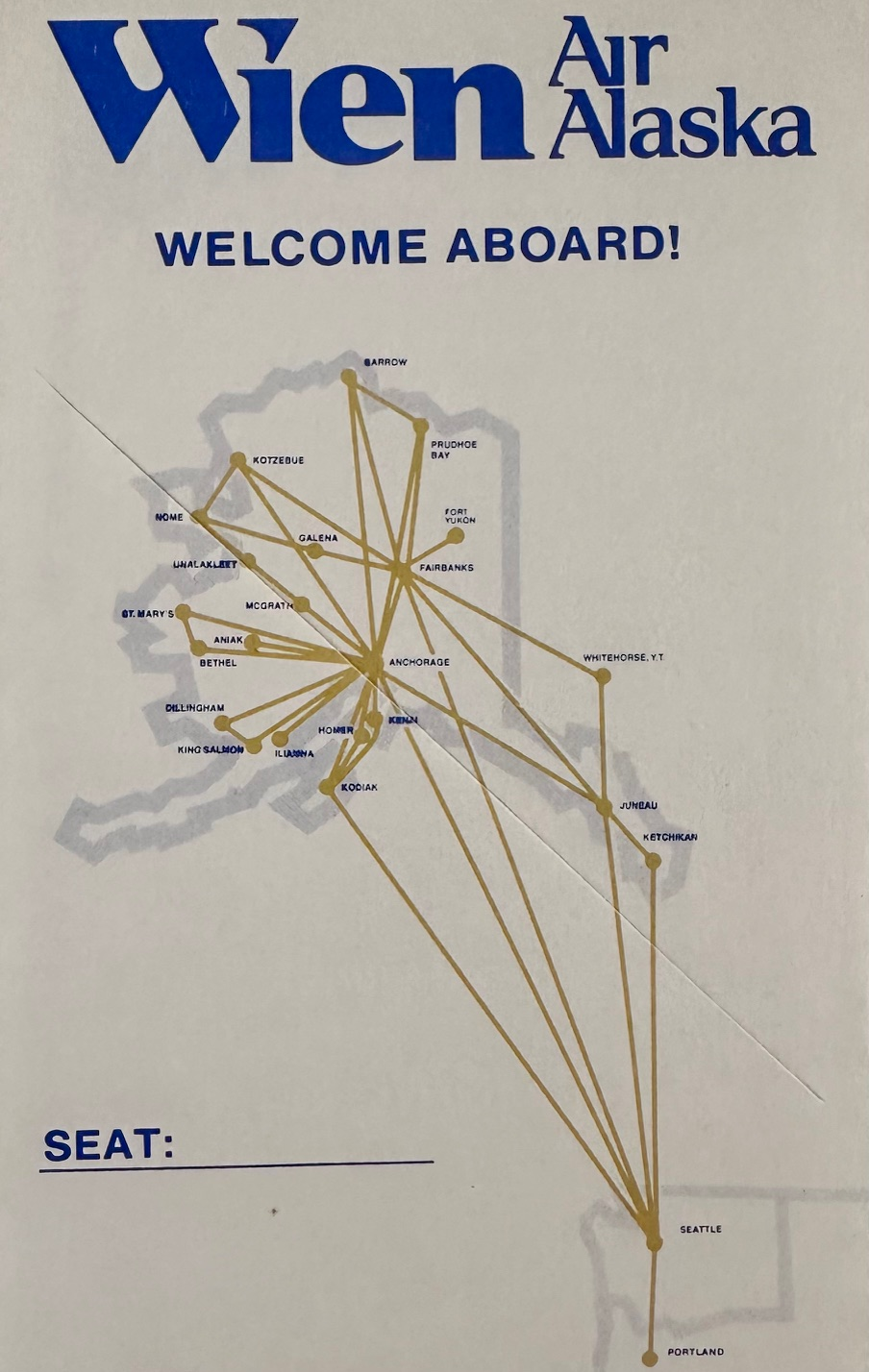
Wien Air Alaska Route Map, September 1981

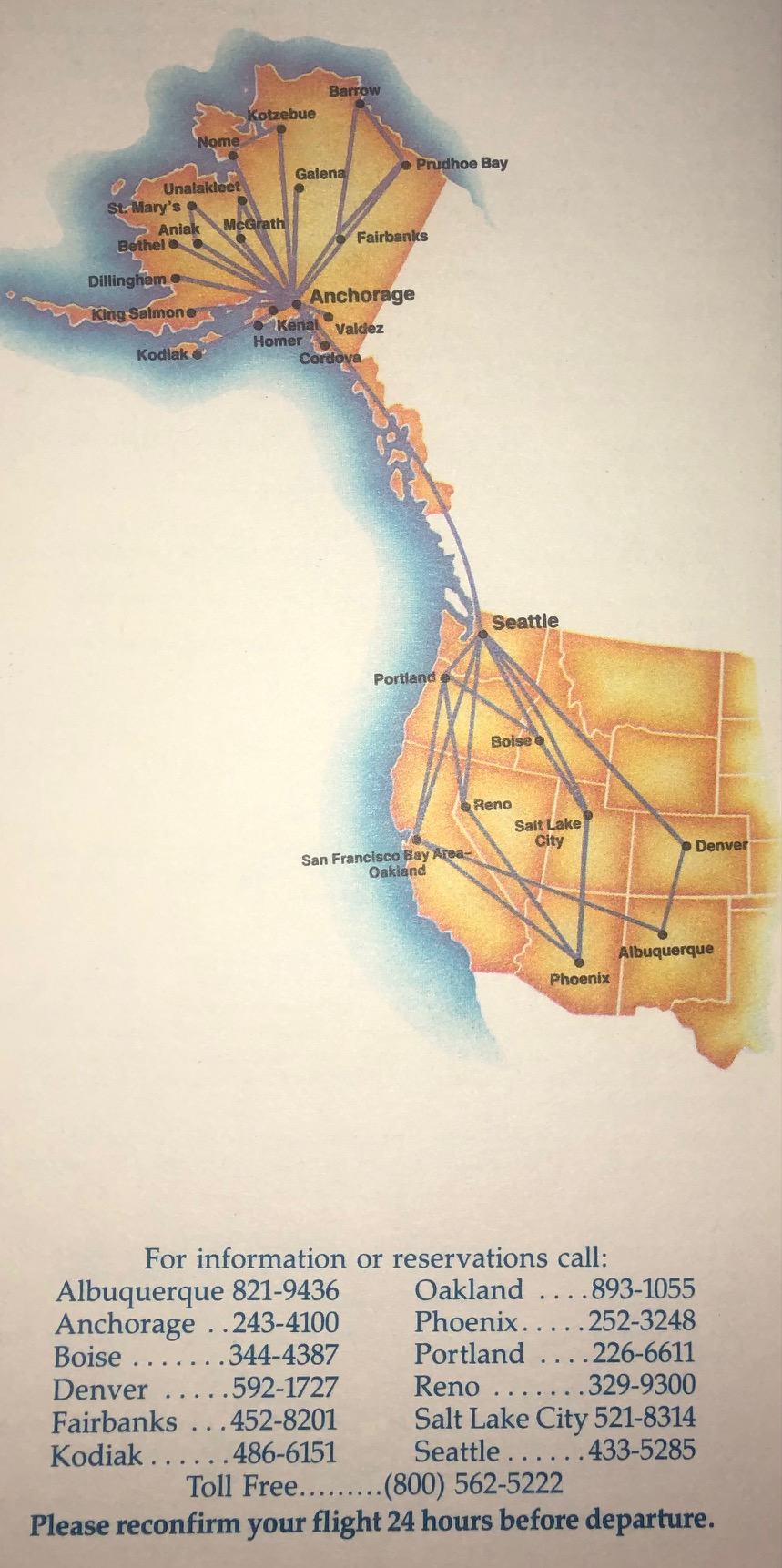
Wien Air Alaska Route Map at the height of their expansion, March 1984

- Albuquerque, NM (ABQ)
- Anchorage, AK (ANC)
- Aniak, AK (ANI)
- Barrow, AK (BRW)
- Bethel, AK (BET)
- Boise, ID (BOI)
- Cordova, AK (CDV)
- Denver, CO (DEN)
- Dillingham, AK (DLG)
- Fairbanks, AK (FAI)
- Galena, AK (GAL)
- Homer, AK (HOM)
- Juneau, AK (JNU) (Ended February 15, 1982)
- Kenai, AK (ENA) (Ended September 11, 1982)
- Ketchikan, AK (KTN) (Ended September 13, 1981)
- King Salmon, AK (AKN)
- Kodiak, AK (ADQ)
- Kotzebue, AK (OTZ)
- McGrath, AK (MCG)
- Nome, AK (OME)
- Oakland, CA (OAK)
- Phoenix, AZ (PHX)
- Portland, OR (PDX)
- Prudhoe Bay, AK (PUO)
- Reno, NV (RNO)
- St. Mary's, AK (KSM)
- Salt Lake City, UT (SLC)
- Seattle, WA (SEA)
- Unalakleet, AK (UNK)
- Valdez, AK (VDZ)
- Whitehorse, YT, Canada (YXY) (Ended September 13, 1981)

Wien previously served Kenai (ENA), Juneau (JNU) and Ketchikan (KTN) in Alaska as well as Whitehorse (YXY) in the Yukon Territory of Canada with Boeing 727-100 and/or Boeing 737-200 jet aircraft.

By September 1981, Wien dropped service to Ketchikan (KTN) & Whitehorse, Yukon (YXY). By February 1982, Wien stopped serving Juneau (JNU) and by September 1982, Wien stopped serving Kenai (ENA).

== Fleet ==
Throughout its existence, Wien Air Alaska has operated many types of aircraft, with the majority of its fleet being propeller-driven. This is a complete list of all aircraft types ever operated by the airline:

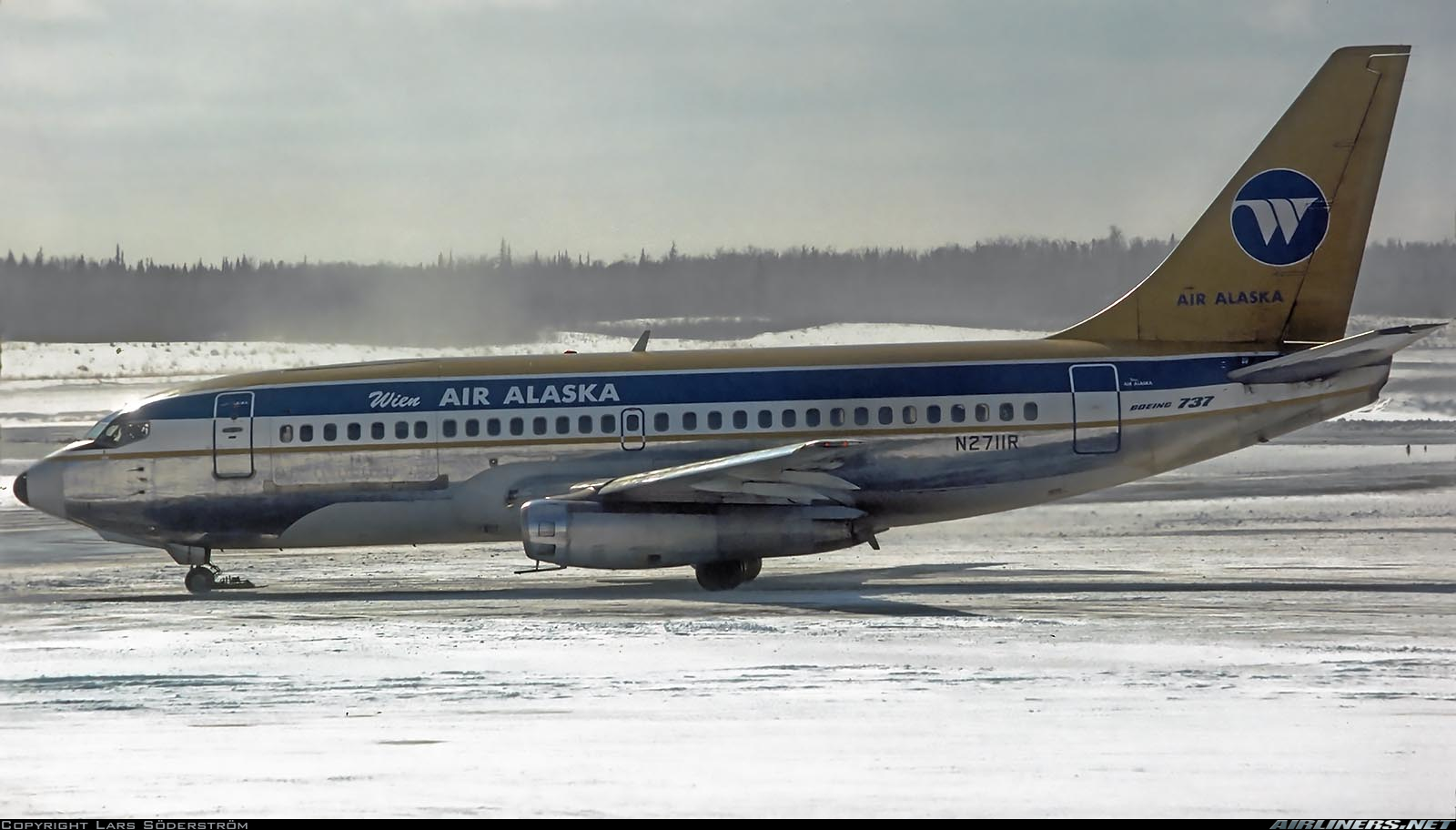
Wien Air Alaska Boeing 737-202C

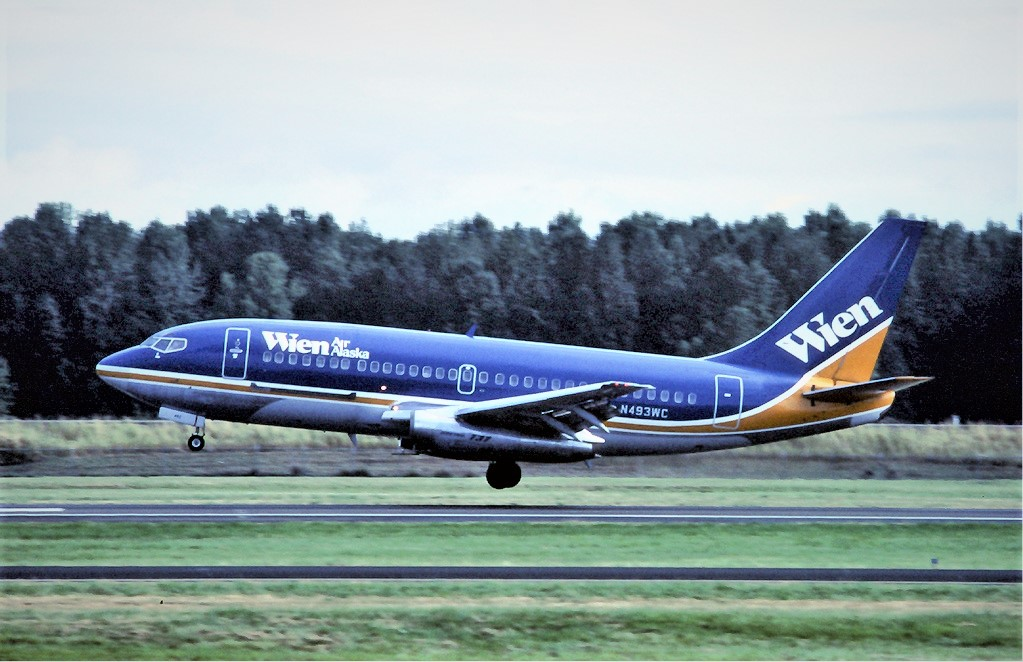
A Boeing 737-200 passenger/freight version in 1983

| Aircraft | In Fleet | Registrations/Notes | Years active |
|---|---|---|---|
| Beechcraft Model 18 | 13 | N41E, N3720G, N5080K, N6416C, N6674C, N7332C, N8032H, N8044H, N61392, N65458, N74629, N79019, N95497 Models: (5) AT-11, (1) AT-11B, (1) C-45H, (5) C18S, (1) T-11) | Active from 1957 to 1966 |
| Bellanca CH-300 Pacemaker | 1 | NC354W Model 300-W | Active from ? |
| Bellanca CH-400 | - | | |
| Boeing 247 | 1 | NC13354 | Active from 1944 to 1946 |
| Boeing 727-100 | 5 | N490W, N495WC, N496WC, N497WC, N498WC (N496WC became N832RV and N498WC became N831RV both to Reeve Aleutian Airways in 1983) | May 1981 - September 1982 (Only 727-100 planes painted in Wien Livery) |
| Boeing 727-100 | 2 | N40481, N40487 (Both in Continental Hybrid Scheme) | Leased from Continental in 1984. |
| Boeing 727-200 | 4 | N274WC, N275WC, N276WC (Leased from Ansett Australia in December 1983.) LV-MIM (Leased from Aerolineas Argentinas in hybrid AR livery in April 1984.) | December 1983 - November 1984 |
| Boeing 737-200 | 10 | N461GB, N491WC, N4902W, N4905W, N4039W, N8536Z (Nordair hybrid), N9009U (United hybrid), N9020U (United Hybrid), N9027U (United Hybrid), EI-BOC (Nordair Hybrid) | Other Historical Leases and Registrations from 1968 to 1983. |
| Boeing 737-200 | 12 | N2711R, N492WC, N493WC, N4906, N4907, N4951W, N4952W, N54AF (Former Air Florida), N7395F (Frontier Hybrid), N7397F (Frontier Hybrid), G-BKMS (Air Belgium Hybrid), G-ILFC (DAN-Air London Hybrid) | Active in 1984. |
| Cessna 165 Airmaster | 1 | NC19463 Model C-38 | Active from ? |
| Cessna 170 | 1 | N9060A | Active from 7/15/1949 - 10/10/1951 (Crashed Outside of Barrow in weather storm) |
| Cessna 185 | - | | |
| Curtiss C-46 | 8 | N1258N, N1548V, N1837M, N4761C, N54339, N74689, N79917, N92853 (Models: (3) C-46F-1-CU, (2) C-46A-50-CU, (1) C-46A-25-CU, (1) C-46A-55-CK, C-46D-10-CU) | Active from 1948 to 1969 |
| de Havilland Canada DHC-2 Beaver | 3 | N1416Z, N3790G, N3791G | Active from 1960 to 1970 |
| de Havilland Canada DHC-6 Twin Otter | 5 | N2714R, N2715R, N4901, N4901W, N4914 (Some ex-Northern Consolidated Airlines (NCA) received) | Active from 1967 to 1977 |
| Douglas DC-3 | 6 | N21748, N21769, N57131, N75142, N91014, N95460 (Models: (3) C-47A-DL, (1) C-47B-DK, (1) R4D-6, (1) DC-3-208A | Active from 1946 to 1969 |
| Douglas DC-4 | 1 | N88940 | Active from 1962 to 1964 |
| Douglas DC-8-63 | 3 | N2674U, N906R, N774FT | 1981-83 Contract cargo operations for UPS |
| Fairchild 71 | 1 | NC10623 | Active from ? |
| Fairchild C-82 | - | | |
| Fairchild Pilgrim | - | | |
| Fairchild-Hiller FH-227 | - | | |
| Fairchild F-27B / Fokker F.27 | 6 | N2708R, N2709R, N2710R, N4903, N4904, N4905 (Models: F-27A & F-27B) Mixed passenger/freighter Combi aircraft variant with large cargo door ordered by Wien, some ex-Northern Consolidated Airlines (NCA) received | Active from 1959 to 1979 |
| Fokker F.III | - | Operated by Noel Wien at the Fairbanks Airplane Company | |
| Fokker Universal | 1 | NC9792 | Active from ? |
| Ford Trimotor | 1 | NC8419 | Years Active 1936–1940 |
| Grumman Mallard | 1 | N1208 Some ex-Northern Consolidated Airlines (NCA) received | Active from 1968 to 1978 |
| Hamilton Metalplane H-45 | 1 | NC10002 | Active from 1929 to 1929 |
| Hamilton Metalplane H-47 | 1 | NC7791 | Active from 1937 to 1939 |
| Lockheed L-749 Constellation | 1 | N7777G | Active from 1964 to 1966 |
| Noorduyn Norseman | 4 | N1207, N61853, N79902, N79909 | Active from 1947 to 1962 |
| Pilatus Porter | 12 | N1409Z, N1412Z, N1417Z, N1421Z, N1422Z, N2851T, N2852T, N2853T, N2854T, N4912, N4913, N4915 | Active from 1961 to 1977 |
| Republic Seabee | - | | |
| Shorts Skyvan | 4 | N40GA, N4906, N4916, N4917 | Active from 1967 to 1974 |
| Standard J-1 | - | | |
| Stearman C2 | 1 | NC5415 | Active from 1929 to 1929 |
| Stearman C3 | | | |
| Stinson SB-1 Detroiter | 1 | NC5262 | Active from 1929-? |
| Stinson SM-2 Junior | - | | |
| Stinson SR-9 Reliant | 1 | N13481 | Active from ? |
| Travel Air 6000 | - | | |
| Total | - | | |

=== Boeing 727s ===
Wien Air Alaska had purchased several Boeing 727-100 Combis in 1981 to provide extra capacity for its routes, which by then extended well into the lower 48 states. At the end of 1983, about a year before it folded, it acquired three of Ansett Australia's oldest Boeing 727-200s. By the end of 1984, the president of Wien Air Alaska, Jim J. Flood, attempted to restructure the company as Wien Airlines, which was the name of the air carrier appearing on the September 1984 timetable. The three Australian 727-200s were leased, at that time, to Republic Airlines (and later to the resurrected Braniff Airways after Republic's merger with Northwest Orient in 1986). It appears that Wien Airlines was probably a "paper company" created merely to handle the leases of the former Wien Air Alaska aircraft. Wien Air Alaska ceased to function as an airline on November 23, 1984, following 60 years of flying. On November 28, 1984, Wien Air Alaska began bankruptcy proceedings and finally folded on October 25, 1985.

=== Boeing 737-200s ===
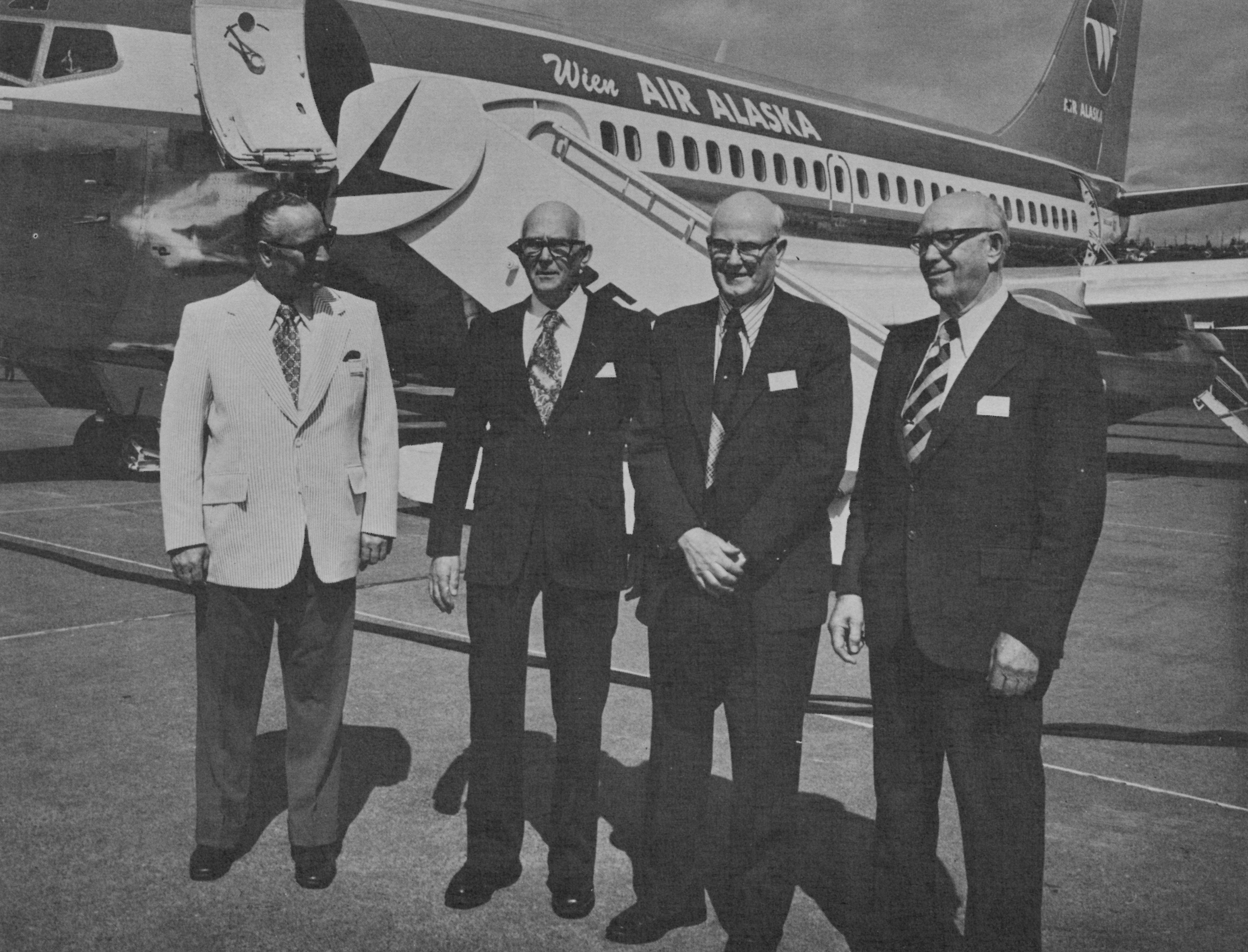
From left, airline president Ray Petersen, Noel Wien, Fritz Wien and Sig Wien as the airline takes delivery of a Boeing 737-200 C on April 12, 1974.

In 1968 Wien merged with Northern Consolidated Airlines (NCA) and became known as Wien Consolidated Airlines until August 1, 1973, when the company name was changed to Wien Air Alaska.

Wien was the launch customer for the Boeing 737-200 Combi aircraft passenger/freighter, and one of the first U.S. operators to commence operations in May 1968 with aircraft N461GB. These aircraft were equipped with a large cargo door on the side of the fuselage just aft of the flight deck near the nose of the 737.

The company pioneered jet service to gravel runways, and helped develop the Boeing 737-200 Combi aircraft configuration which allowed mixed freight and passenger loads on the main deck of the aircraft.

One former Wien aircraft (N4952W) was later acquired by First Air, an Arctic Northern Canadian airline, which then crashed operating as First Air Flight 6560 (C-GNWN) at Resolute Airport in the high Arctic region of Canada. Other primary users of the Boeing 737-200 Combi version in Alaska were Alaska Airlines and MarkAir.

== Logos and trademarks gallery ==
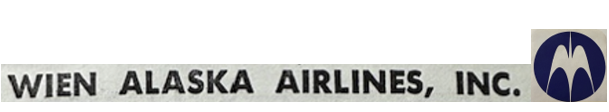
Prior to 1968 merger with NCA

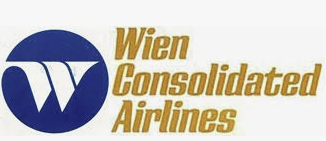
Years 1968–71

Years 1973–81

Years 1981–84

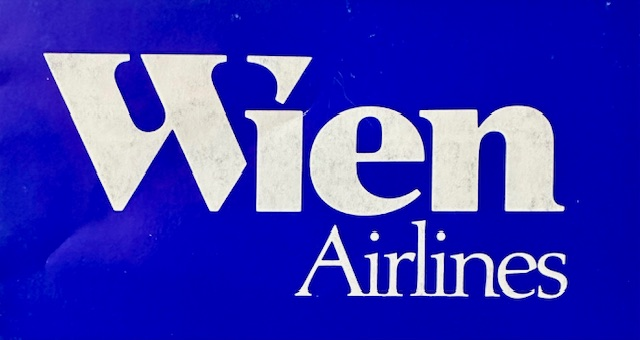
September to November 1984

== Incidents and accidents ==
- December 2, 1968 – Flight 55: Fairchild F-27B crashed into Spotsy Lake, Pedro Bay, Alaska; all 39 people on board were killed.
- August 30, 1975 – Flight 99: Fairchild F-27B crashed on approach to Gambell, Alaska; 10 of the 32 passengers and crew on board were killed.

== See also ==
- Russel Merrill
- List of defunct airlines of the United States
