= Noel Wien =

American pioneer aviator (1899–1977)

Noel Wien (June 8, 1899 – July 19, 1977) was an American pioneer aviator. He was the founder of Wien Alaska Airways.

== Biography ==
Wien was born in Lake Nebagamon, Wisconsin, but the family moved to a homestead in 1905, to a place now called Cook, Minnesota. In May 1921, he learned to fly a JN-4 in 8 hours, from Major Ray S. Miller, commander of the 109th Minnesota Air Squadron and manager of the Curtiss Northwest Airplane Company's flying school. Unable to pay the bond required to solo, Wien took a job with E.W. Morrill 15 June 1921, helping to fly and maintain his Standard J-1 while barnstorming. After a few more flying jobs, on 2 Sept. 1922, Wien had enough money to put a downpayment on a Thomas-Morse S-4, which he owned for two weeks, unable to make the final payment. Wien then started working for Clarence W. Hinck's Federated Flyers Flying Circus, earning $300 a month, before Hinck's sold out his operation in Jan. 1924. Wien was then hired by Jimmy Rodebaugh, in May 1924, to fly 2 Standards for his Alaska Aerial Transportation Company. When Wien first arrived in Alaska he had 538.5 hours of flying time.

Wien's first Anchorage flight, from the newly prepared Delaney Park Strip, took place on 4 June 1924. This was soon followed by Anchorage's first passenger flights, and Wien put on Anchorage's first aerobatic show for the 4th of July celebrations. Then on 6 July, Wien and Bill Yunker, made the first flight from Anchorage to Fairbanks, flying from Delaney Park Strip to Weeks Field. They completed the flight in under 4 hours, while the trip via Alaska Railroad took 2 days. Then, on 19 Aug. 1924, Wien made the first bush flight to Livengood, Alaska in support of the mining operations located there, making the trip in under an hour when it took several days via dog sled. That Oct., Wien made the first flight over the Arctic Circle.

During the following winter season, the Standards sat idle. In Feb. 1925, Wien purchased a Fokker F. III from Atlantic Aircraft in New Jersey and had it shipped to Rodebaugh's newly formed Fairbanks Airplane Company. Though the pilot still sat in an open cockpit, 5 passengers rode in an enclosed compartment within the fuselage. Wien also brought his brother Ralph to Alaska as a replacement for the mechanic Bill Yunker. Noel and Ralph made the first commercial flight from Fairbanks to Nome in June 1925.

Noel flew until Nov. 1925 when he and Ralph quit the Fairbanks Airplane Company. Noel headed south to barnstorm the midwest in 1926, then headed back to Alaska with his brother Fritz in March 1927. In 1926, Noel was issued pilot license No. 39 signed by Fédération Aéronautique Internationale Official Orville Wright.

Noel and Ralph Wien went into partnership with Gene Miller, and purchased a very used Hisso Standard from the Fairbanks Airplane Co. in 1927. In June they established their business in Nome, servicing Candle, Deering, Kotzebue, and Point Hope.

At the end of the summer of 1927, Noel went into business for himself, purchasing a Stinson Detroiter he could fly year round, from Hubert Wilkins. Noel, and his Wien Alaska Airways, started a regular weekly round trip flight between Fairbanks and Nome. Noel also secured special air mail flights during the spring and fall breakup. Ralph and Noel made skis for the plane, from 8 by 1 foot hickory wood, modeled after the skis their father made back in Minnesota. Wien added a second plane, a Waco 9, in the spring of 1928, and taught Ralph and Fritz to fly.

On 20 Oct. 1928, Wien Alaska Airways, Inc. was incorporated with Noel as president, Ralph as vice-president, and Miners and Merchants Bank president Granville (Grant) R. Jackson as secretary. The new company built a hangar at Weeks Field and promptly ordered a Hamilton Metalplane. At the end of 1928, Noel had accumulated 1290 hours of flying time in Alaska for a total of 1940 hours. Noel was one of eight pilots in Alaska, while Ralph was one of twelve mechanics. They operated three of the seventeen aircraft in the Territory.

In March 1929, Noel and Ralph bought and refurbished a Stearman from Arctic Prospecting and Development Company, which had crashed and was abandoned on Walker Lake.

On 7 March 1929, Noel and Calvin (Doc) Cripe made the first flight across the Bering Strait, the first nonstop flight from America to Asia (Nome to North Cape), and return the next day. The flight was at the request of the Swenson Herskovitz Trading Company to fly furs out of an ice bound Elisif.

Noel married Ada Bering Arthurs, of Nome, on 19 May 1929. After which, Noel moved his company headquarters to Fairbanks.

In 1929, Noel, Ralph and Grant Jackson sold Wien Alaska Airways to Avco. Noel's company plus Anchorage Air Transport and Bennett-Rodebaugh were merged into a new company called Alaskan Airways, Inc. Noel remained as a pilot for the new company and Ralph was retained as a mechanic and back-up pilot. However, Noel and Ada headed south where they purchased a Stinson Junior, and their son Noel Merrill Wien was born on 4 April 1930 in Minnesota. In Sept., the Noel family made plans to head back to Alaska, Ada and baby by train and boat, while Noel would fly the Stinson with his master mechanic brother Sigurd (Sig). Sadly though, news arrived on 12 Oct. of Ralph's death in a Kotzebue crash. Their return was delayed until Dec. 1930, so they could bury Ralph in Cook. Noel flew for Alaskan Airways from Feb. 1931 until Jan. 1932, after selling them his Stinson. In Aug. 1932, once his non-compete clause ended, he restarted Wien Airways of Alaska, Inc., with a Bellanca CH-300 Pacemaker.

Wien and Vic Ross achieved the "biggest scoop of the year" in 1935, according to Ira Harkey, when they delivered Alfred Lomen and his film of the Post-Rogers crash to Seattle for International News Service, ahead of a competing flight chartered by the Associated Press. Wien pioneered an inland route from Fairbanks to Whitehorse, Yukon, to Prince George, British Columbia, to Seattle, when all other flyers used floatplanes to fly a coastal route starting with the Lynn Canal to Juneau, and then onwards to Seattle. Wien and Ross departed Fairbanks at 10:45 PM on 17 Aug., and landed in Seattle at 12:30 PM the next day. Wien and Ross used the money earned from that flight to purchase a Ford Trimotor 5-AT. They then made the first Seattle to Fairbanks passenger flight on 28-31 Aug.

In 1935, Wien contracted polio, but survived with only a limp in his right leg, and continued to fly. Then, in 1938, he received a piece of metal in his right eye, and a botched operation meant the loss of sight in that eye and the consequent depth perception, yet he continued to fly. The eye was removed in 1946, and replaced with a glass eye. Though still flying, he stopped logging hours after 11,600. His last forced landing was in 1956.

He died on July 19, 1977, in Bellevue, Washington.

== Legacy ==
- The Noel Wien Public Library in Fairbanks, Alaska is named after him. The library sits on the site of Weeks Field, the original airport in Fairbanks and base for many of Wien's early accomplishments. Weeks Field Park, adjacent to the library, was previously called Wien Park.
- Flying runs in the family: his sons, Noel Merrill Wien and Richard A. Wien, and grandsons Kurt, Michael and Kent all became commercial pilots as well.
- Noel Wien was inducted into the Minnesota Aviation History Museum Hall of Fame in 1989, the Alaska Aviation Heritage Museum Hall of Fame in 2000 and the National Aviation Hall of Fame in 2010.
- Wien Mountain is located in the Brooks Range, Wien Lake is located in the Kilbuck-Kuskokwim Mountains, Wien Street is located in Fairbanks, 15 July 1974 was declared Noel Wien Day, and Noel was declared Alaskan of the Year in 1975.
