= Cherry Hill Public Library =

Public library in Cherry Hill, New Jersey, US

Coordinates: 39.9205°N 75.00319°W

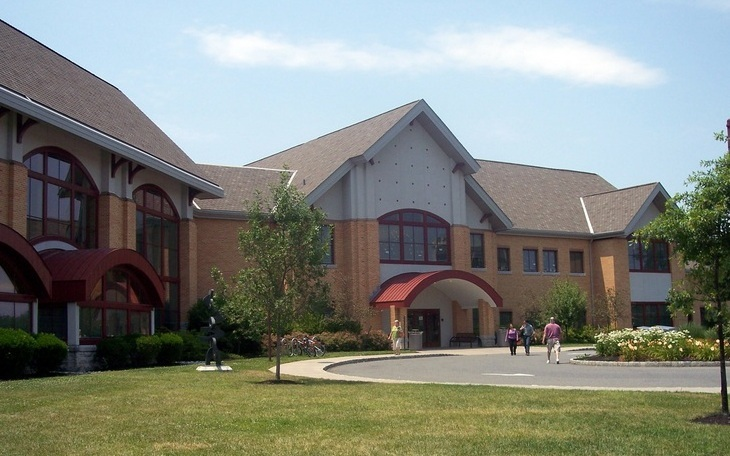
Cherry Hill Public Library

The Cherry Hill Public Library is a public library located at 1100 Kings Highway North in Cherry Hill, New Jersey. The library is overseen by the Library Board of Trustees and run by The Library Director. Originally called The Cherry Hill Free Public Library, the word "Free" was dropped from the title in 2003. The current library building was completed in December 2004 to replace a 1966 structure just northeast of the same location. In old aerial images of the area, the double-diamonds with the brown roof structure and grassy lot are the old Library before demolition. The pad to the southwest of the old library was the site of Richman's Ice Cream before its demolition; and this site has become the site of the new library building.

At 72,000 square feet (6,700 m^{2}), Cherry Hill's newest library is among the largest municipal libraries in New Jersey.

== Facility history ==
Originally located in a storefront at Ellisburg Circle Shopping Center (at Route 70 and Route 41, locally known as Kings Highway), in the current location spanning both the Post Office and Blockbuster Video, the Cherry Hill Free Public Library moved 1/4 mile northeast in 1966 into a building at 1100 Kings Highway North. The then-futuristic building, designed by architect Malcolm Wells, incorporated unusual design elements, including the cataloguing and administrative offices located in its massive concrete bunker basement, concealed from public view; and the massive rectangular wooden totem pole extending from the ground floor to the rooftop in the main stairwell, which had a donated wrought iron sculpture donated in the 1970s, removed during demolition and eventually installed in the front of the new Library in 2009. By the late 1990s, the Wells building was deemed by the Board to be overcrowded, difficult to maintain due to roof leaks and other infrastructure problems resulting in the firing of Library Director David Munn, and too expensive to expand, notably due to a lack of parking, so the Library Board of Directors commissioned a new design.

While the new library building was constructed, Cherry Hill Library members were served via interlibrary agreements by libraries in neighboring Moorestown and Haddonfield; and also the Camden County Library near the Voorhees Town Center in Voorhees, which had a longstanding inter-library loan agreement negotiated by the beloved longtime Library Director, the late Berniece Ahlquist, which she joked about at her retirement party at The Rickshaw Inn.

== Cherry Hill Historical Society ==
The Cherry Historical society is located in the basement adjacent to the stairwell. Although it has limited hours and only open for 2 days per week, the room has glass walls on two sides, where patrons can view part of the collection, a large portion donated by 37+ year Library Board member Kathleen Schwartz (1973–2009) when the building opened; and more as her son Dan cleaned out her family home in 2016.

== Statistics ==
Membership currently stands at about 36,000 cardholders with roughly 97% of members indicating Cherry Hill residency. Residents subscribe to the library free of charge and access the collection of more than 150,000 volumes, 150 computers with high-speed internet connectivity, and the library's various amenities including a conference center, art gallery, historical artifact room, meeting, and reading spaces.

== Friends of the Cherry Hill Library ==
The library is partially supported by the non-profit agency 'Friends of the Cherry Hill Library.' The Friends organizes various fundraising efforts including the sales of book tiles, trees, and bricks surrounding the trees; and public awareness campaigns to benefit the library, and members of the group volunteer time for library operations and events.

=== Book tile wall ===
The lobby of the new Library is adorned with hundreds of ceramic tiles in the form of book spines, arranged in a shelf configuration and numbered in order of purchase. This fundraiser is based on a similar fundraising project at Noel Wien Public Library in Fairbanks, Alaska; and was brought to the new Library by longtime Board member Kathleen Schwartz after her visiting the Fairbanks facility in the summer of 2003. Tile number 1 was dedicated to local property management firm Needleman Associates to honor their longtime support of the library, including their providing overflow parking. Tile number 2 is dedicated to the now–deceased Mrs. Schwartz, who worked as a Library cataloguer in the 1960s, and who had been on the library Board of Directors from 1973 until 2009 as its longest-serving member. Upon her death in March 2018, tile number 5, dedicated to Kathleen and Joseph Schwartz was adorned with a torn black ribbon by her son.

=== "Sunday Morning" sculpture ===
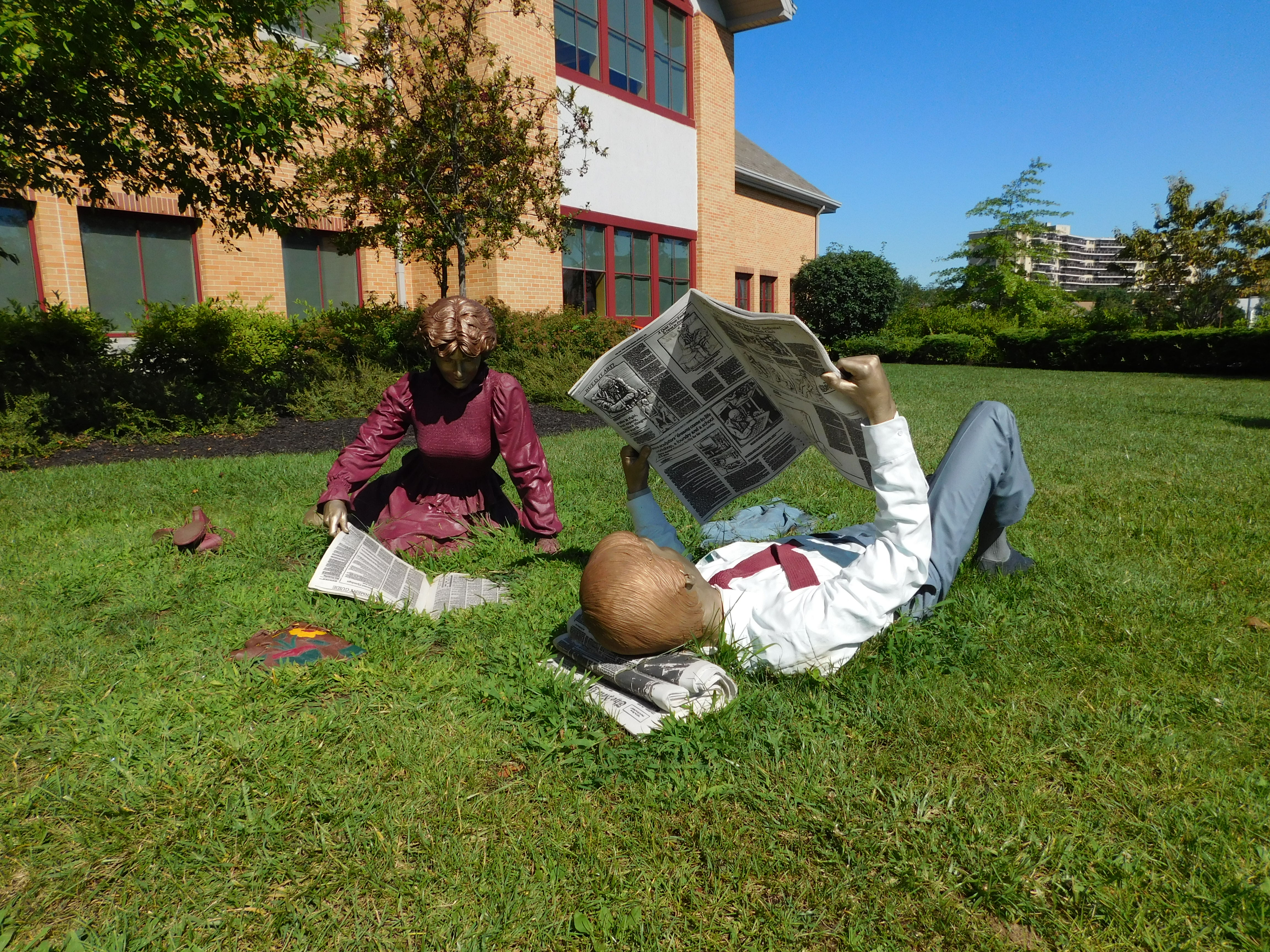
Sunday Morning, by Seward Johnson at the Cherry Hill Public Library

In 2007, the Friends of the Library announced the completion of fundraising efforts to retain the loaned sculpture, "Sunday Morning" by J Seward Johnson Jr, which rests on the library's front lawn near the building's main entrance, with the artist reducing his price from $160,000 to $80,000.

=== "Totem" and totem pole sculptures ===
The sculpture "Totem" is by the artist David Ascalon, a long-time Cherry Hill resident. Originally it was installed in the main lobby on the rectangular wooden totem pole in the stairwell of the Library in the 1970s as a memorial. On September 24, 2009, the sculpture was permanently installed to the building's front lawn.

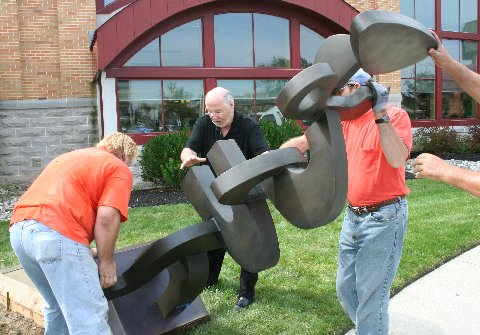
September 24, 2009 installation of David Ascalon's "Totem" at the Cherry Hill Public Library

This not to be confused with the rectangular totem pole wrought iron sculpture that was removed from the Malcolm Wells building upon its demolition, which is also installed outside the new Library.

=== Board room conference table ===
Although not in public view, the Library board room has a massive oak conference table costing $8,000, donated by Mrs. Schwartz to go in the conference room when the building opened. The board room is located in the administrative offices on the first floor, which is adjacent to the circulation desk, which also has her service plaque on the wall donated by her son upon her death.
