= George C. Thomas Memorial Library =

Building in Fairbanks, Alaska

- U.S. National Register of Historic Places
- U.S. National Historic Landmark
- Alaska Heritage Resources Survey
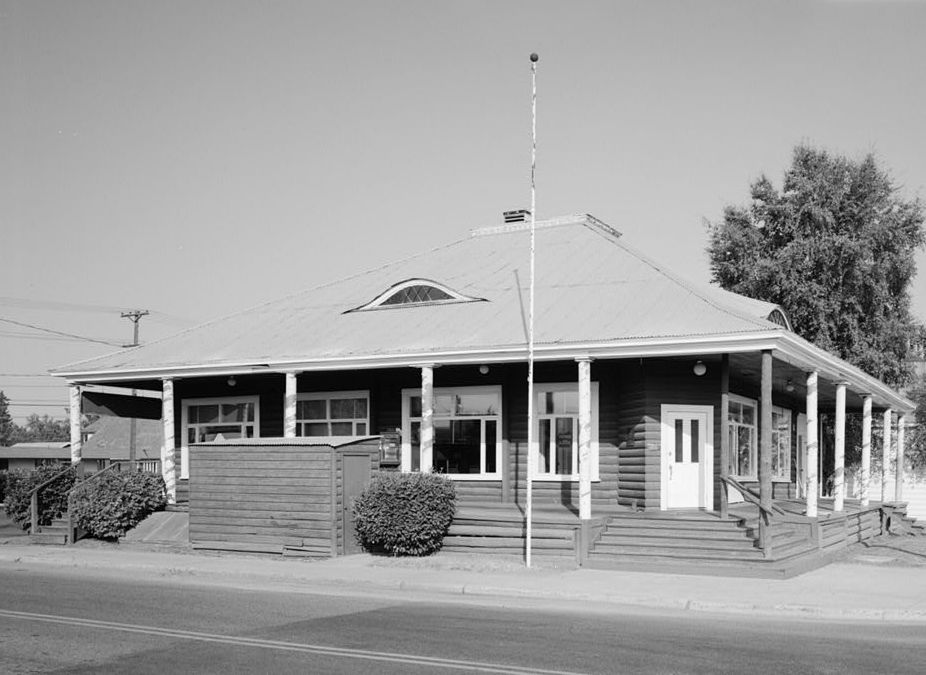
- HABS in 1991

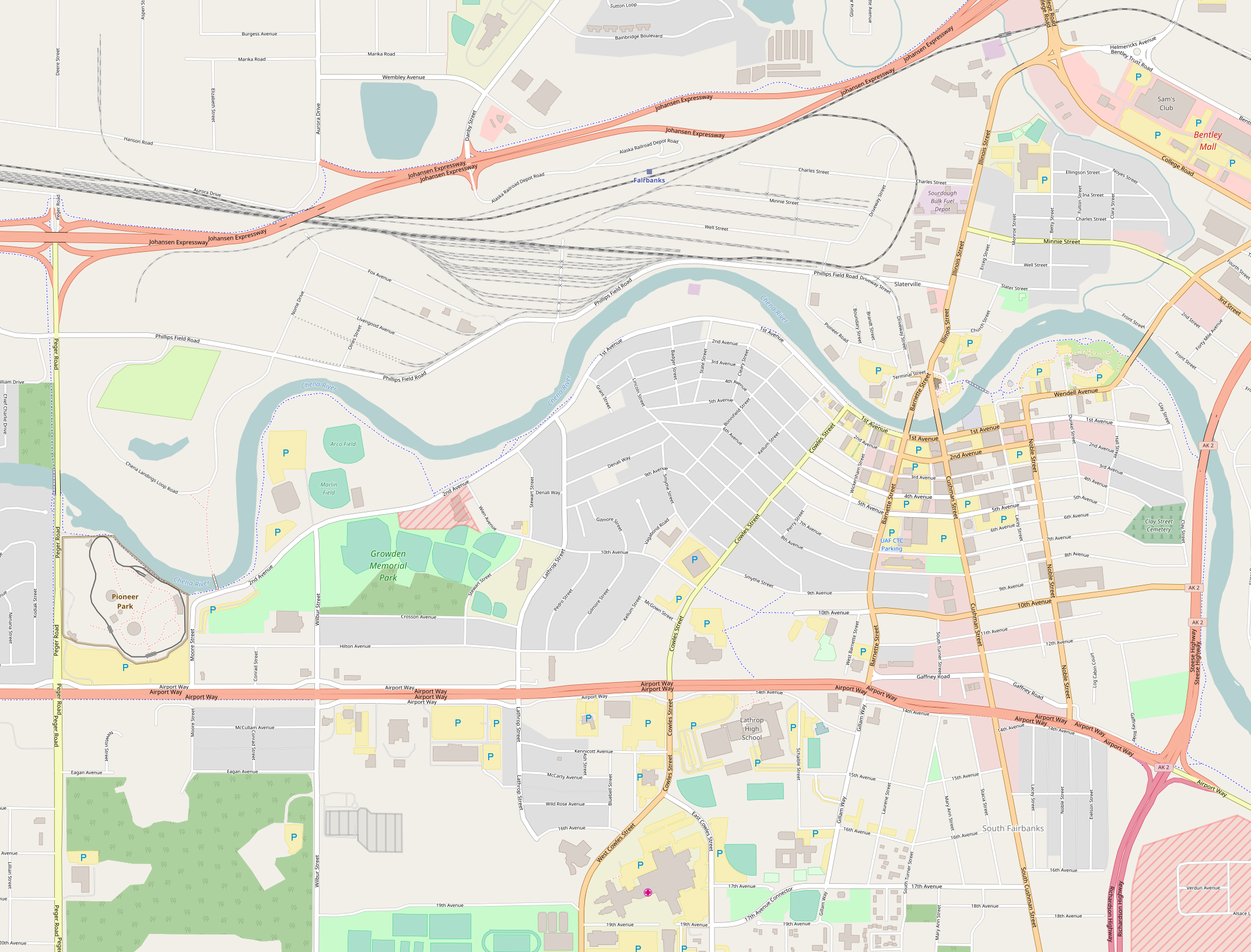
- Location within Downtown Fairbanks Location within Alaska
- Location: 901 1st Avenue, Fairbanks, Alaska
- Coordinates: 64°50′41″N 147°43′41″W
- Area: 0.5 acres (0.20 ha)
- Built: 1909
- NRHP reference No.: 72001542
- AHRS No.: FAI-004

Significant dates
- Added to NRHP: February 23, 1972
- Designated NHL: June 02, 1978
- Designated AHRS: February 23, 1972

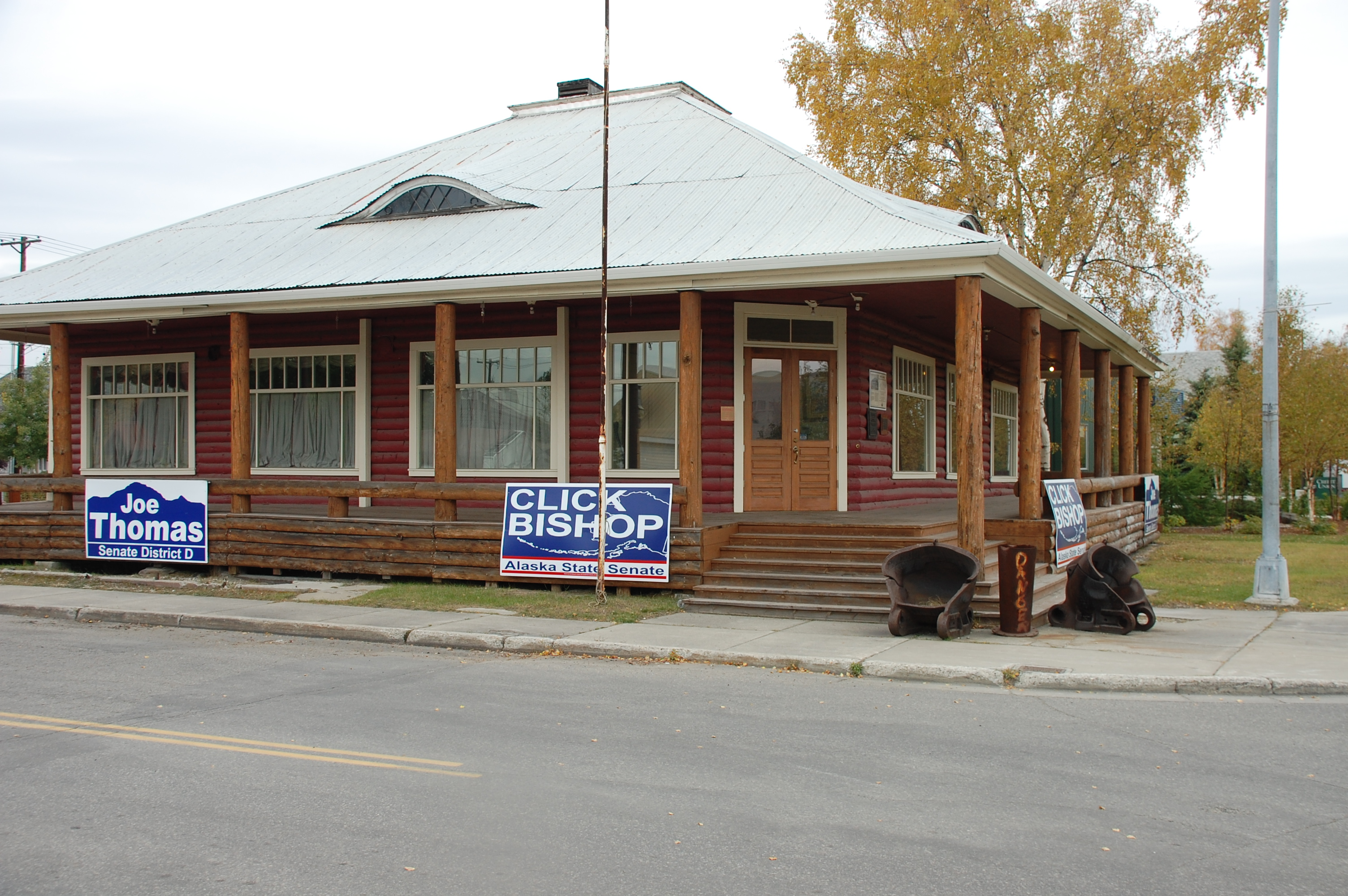
It looks pretty much the same in 2012

The George C. Thomas Memorial Library, also known as the North Star Borough Library, is a historic former library building at 901 1st Avenue in Fairbanks, Alaska. Built in 1909 with funding from philanthropist George C. Thomas, this log building served Fairbanks as its public library until 1977, when the Noel Wien Public Library was opened. This building was designated a National Historic Landmark in 1978 as the site of a key conference in 1915 between Alaska Native leaders and federal government representatives, at which the Native leaders pressed a number of issues, including the long-running matter of native land claims, which would not be resolved until the 1971 Alaska Native Claims Settlement Act.

== Description and history ==
The Thomas Library building is a square log structure with a hip roof that extends over a porch on two sides. The porch is supported by six log columns on each side, and the building's main entrance is located at the corner under the porch. Construction of the building was funded by George C. Thomas, a Philadelphia philanthropist who was interested in the missionary work of the Episcopal Church, which had been providing limited library services to Fairbanks since 1904. The building was dedicated on August 5, 1909. The building and library collection were sold to the city of Fairbanks for $1 in 1940, on the condition the building always house a library. The Fairbanks North Star Borough took over operation of the library in 1968. Since the library was moved to new quarters in 1977, the building has seen commercial use.

The building was listed on the National Register of Historic Places in 1972, and was designated a National Historic Landmark in 1978. The latter designation was made in recognition of a significant event in the history of Alaska. On July 5 and 6, 1915, a delegation of Alaska Native leaders met with a committee of United States Government officials and representatives of the Alaska Territory to discuss a variety of concerns. Although the issues ranged to matters of employment, education, the major issue was that of native land claims, which were a significant cloud on many land transactions in the territory. The meeting marked the beginning of a lengthy struggle by the natives for recognition which culminated in the passage in 1971 of the Alaska Native Claims Settlement Act, landmark legislation granting them sweeping rights and compensation.

== See also ==
- Constitution Hall (University of Alaska Fairbanks), site of conference where native leaders accepted the claims agreement
- List of National Historic Landmarks in Alaska
- National Register of Historic Places listings in Fairbanks North Star Borough, Alaska
