= Noel Wien Public Library =

Public library in Fairbanks, Alaska

- 64°50′17.89″N 147°44′8.31″W
- Location: 1215 Cowles St, Fairbanks, Alaska
- Established: 1909

Collection
- Size: 100,000 (est)

Other information
- Director: Jamia Alexander Ball

The Noel Wien Public Library, operated by the Fairbanks North Star Borough, is located in Fairbanks, Alaska. It has a branch library in North Pole, Alaska. The library has more than 100,000 titles in its collections. It is the second-largest library in the Fairbanks area after the Elmer E. Rasmuson Library at the University of Alaska Fairbanks.

== History ==
The library was named after Alaskan aviator Noel Wien and its main branch stands on the site of Weeks Field, Fairbanks' original airport. The original public library in Fairbanks was the George C. Thomas Memorial Library, a log building which was constructed in 1909 to replace the reading room in St. Matthew's Episcopal Mission. Funding for the 1909 structure was supported by George C. Thomas of Philadelphia, who also donated $1,000 a year for three years to buy books. In 1942, St. Matthew's deeded the lot, building, and collections to the city of Fairbanks. In 1949 a fire destroyed one-third of the collections, but through subsequent donations the library grew to more than 4,000 volumes. In 1967 the library again lost many of its books due to the flooding of the Chena River that August. The next year, 1968, ownership of the library was transferred to the borough, and the collection swelled to 20,000 items. In 1974, a library construction bond passed, providing $4.2 million for construction of a new building. In 1977, the new Noel Wien Library opened its doors to the public.

In 2023, the library closed for renovations and expansion.

=== Book Tile Project ===
Since 1998, ceramic tiles made to look like book spines have decorated the main entry to Noel Wien Library. Sales of the tiles has raised $80,000 for library furnishings, equipment and artwork, and the project was the brainchild of the Library Support Group, Inc., a nonprofit organization dedicated to furnishing and improving the local public libraries. The Support Group merged with the Fairbanks Library Foundation in 2006, and the foundation now oversees the Book Tile project.

The tiles are made in a variety of realistic sizes and colors and can be and memorialized for $100 each, with all proceeds dedicated to benefiting the library. A noted local ceramic artist, Nancy Hausle-Johnson, makes the tiles to look like real books as viewed from the spine. The oak shelves holding the tiles are made to resemble the library's wooden shelves and are located just inside the library's main entrance and generate a great deal of positive comments from visitors.

This tile wall was the inspiration for a similar project at the Cherry Hill Public Library after a June 2003 visit by longtime board member Kathleen Schwartz to the Wien Library.
