= Weeks Field =

Former airport in Fairbanks, Alaska, United States

Coordinates: 64°50′18″N 147°43′59″W

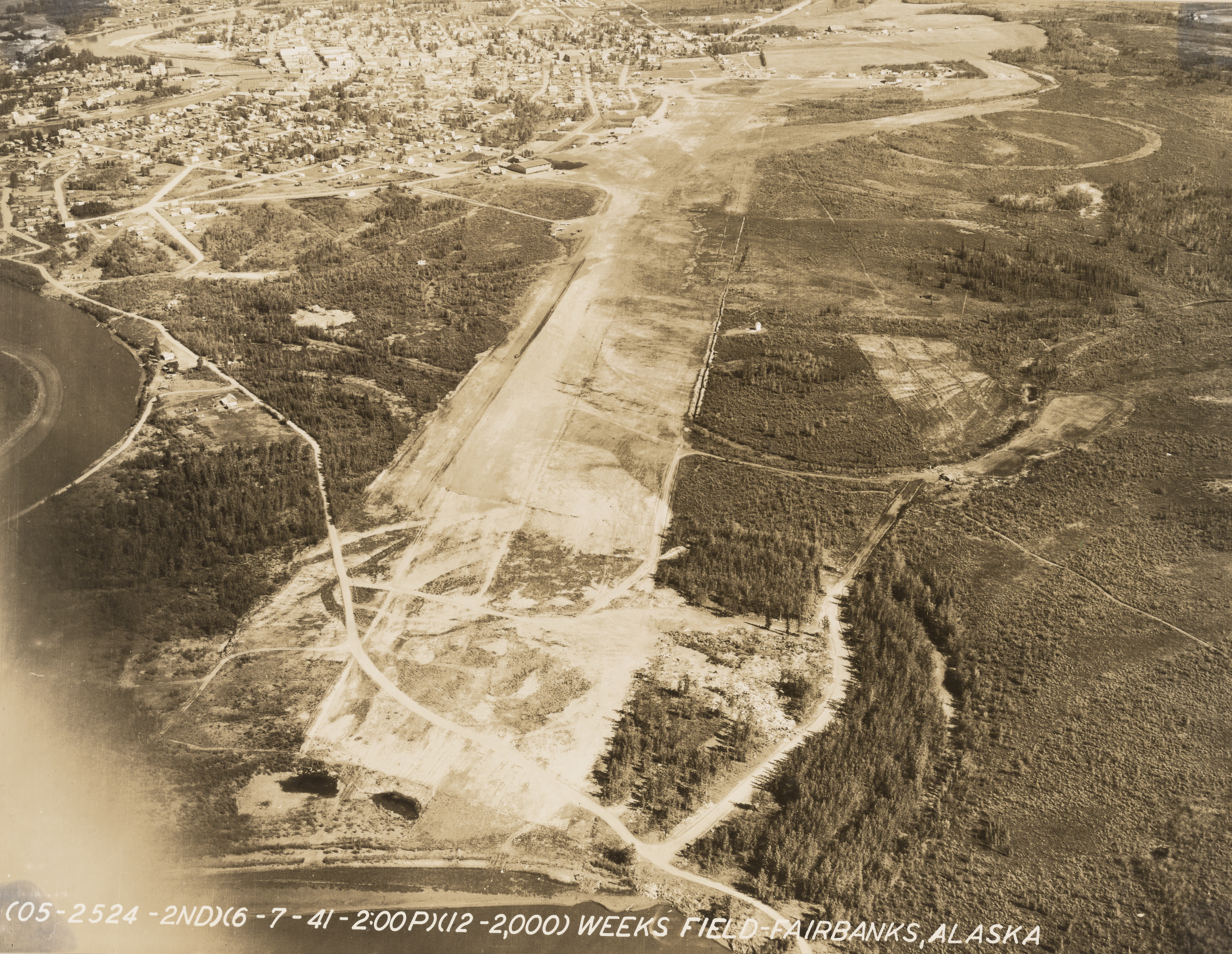
Weeks Field Runway, 1934

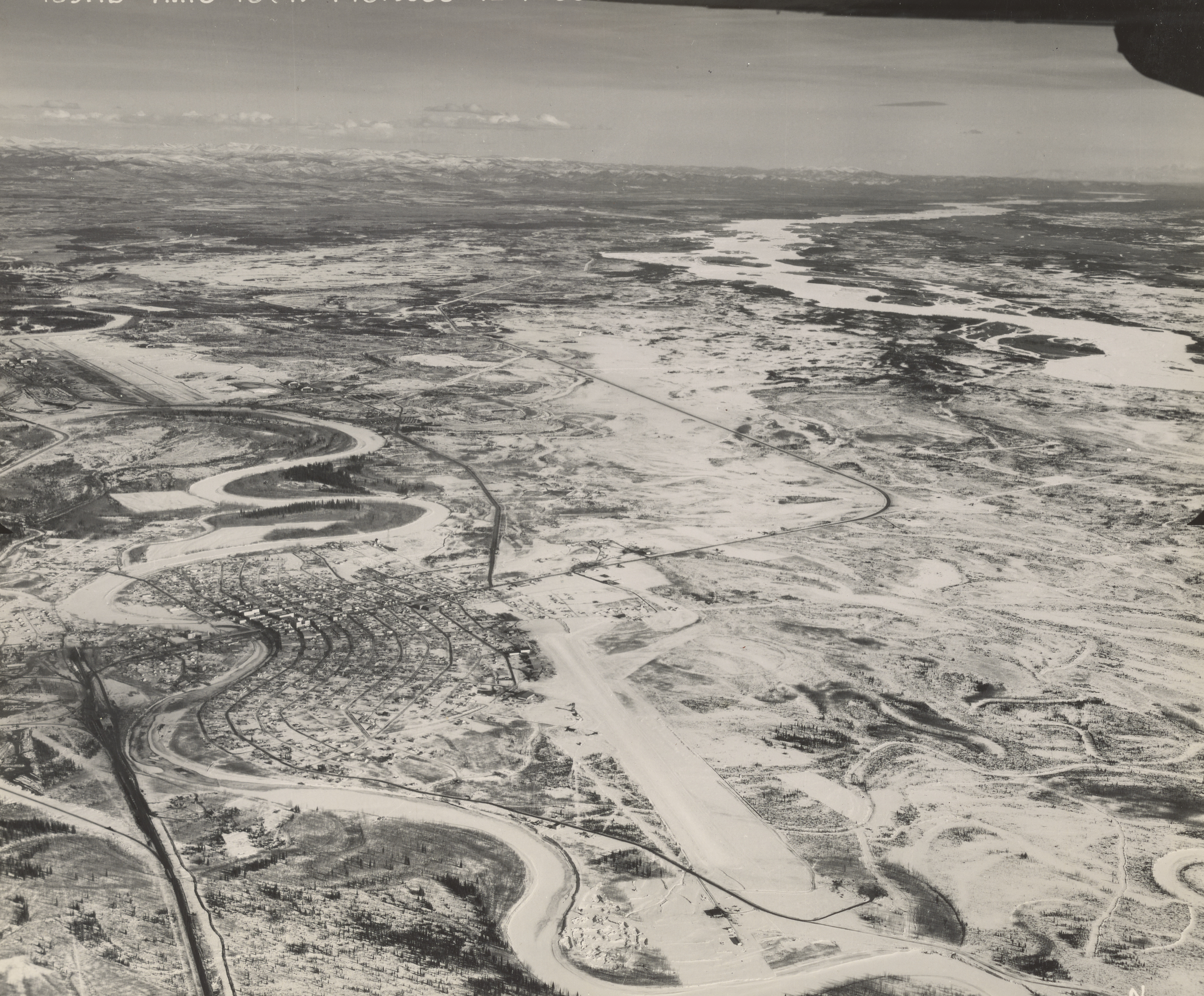
Aerial view of Fairbanks, Weeks Field visible on the right (1934)

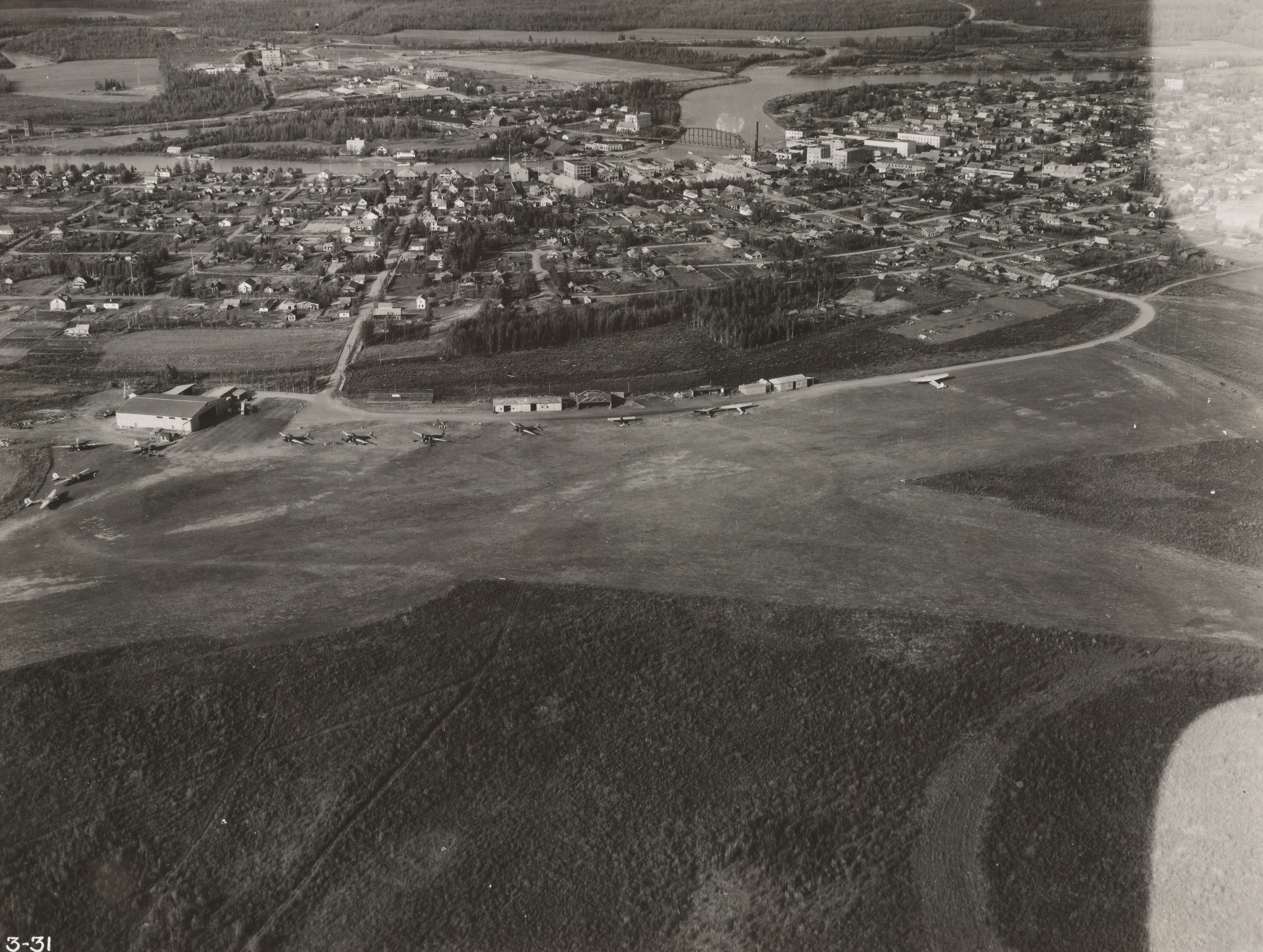
Detail view of airport facilities, 1934

Weeks Field was the first airport for Fairbanks, Alaska, existing from 1923 to 1951, when most operations were moved to Fairbanks International Airport. In later years, the term Weeks Field came to be known for neighborhoods of Fairbanks in the path and vicinity of the former airstrip. Most of the area became a city (later borough) park and residential areas, with the few surviving buildings serving mostly commercial functions.

Weeks Field was built in 1923 on the site of a baseball field named Weeks Ball Park, which had served as an impromptu landing strip for airplanes prior to the construction of the airport. On July 4, 1923, Carl Ben Eielson flew the first commercial aircraft flight in Alaska from Weeks Field.

The baseball field/race track was named after John W. Weeks. Noel Wien and Bill Yunker made the first non-stop flight between Anchorage and Fairbanks on 6 July 1924, taking off from Delaney Park Strip and landing at Weeks Field in under 4 hours.

On 20 Oct. 1928, Wien Alaska Airways, Inc. was incorporated with Noel Wien as president, Ralph Wien as vice-president, and Miners and Merchants Bank president Granville (Grant) R. Jackson as secretary. The new company built a hangar at Weeks Field.

During the Second World War, Weeks Field was used by the U.S. Army Air Corps, which also built nearby Ladd Army Airfield.

The construction of Denali Elementary School, which began in 1950 near the western end of the runway, signaled the end of active operations for Weeks Field. The Fairview Manor apartment complex and a subdivision of single-family homes followed soon after in the immediate area. In 1951, the control tower for the field was closed, which burned down shortly afterward. Most operators had moved to the newly opened Fairbanks International Airport. Several operators who had felt bitter over being forced to move, led by Jess Bachner, established the Phillips Field airstrip several miles northwest of Fairbanks, near College.

The city of Fairbanks later converted the area to a park, originally called Wien Park. The park is currently owned by the Fairbanks North Star Borough, which assumed control of the former city parks, and the Weeks Field name has been restored to the property. The borough built the Noel Wien Public Library in 1977 on a portion of the former airfield, after the site was originally proposed to house a new police station for Fairbanks.

A number of structures which supported operations for the airfield still stand. Most prominent is the former Pan American Airways hangar, which currently houses commercial and office space as well as a bowling alley. A Lutheran church, which may resemble a hangar but was built in 1960 as a church, lies south of the Pan Am hangar. The former Gillam Airways hangar, which anchors the current Gillam Way at its intersection with Airport Way, has housed numerous businesses over the years and is currently home to a pawn shop.

In 2009, work began on demolishing Fairview Manor and replacing it with a new housing complex. The new housing complex is also named after the airfield and located on a portion of its grounds.
